= Joseph Thomas (surveyor) =

New Zealand surveyor (1803–??)

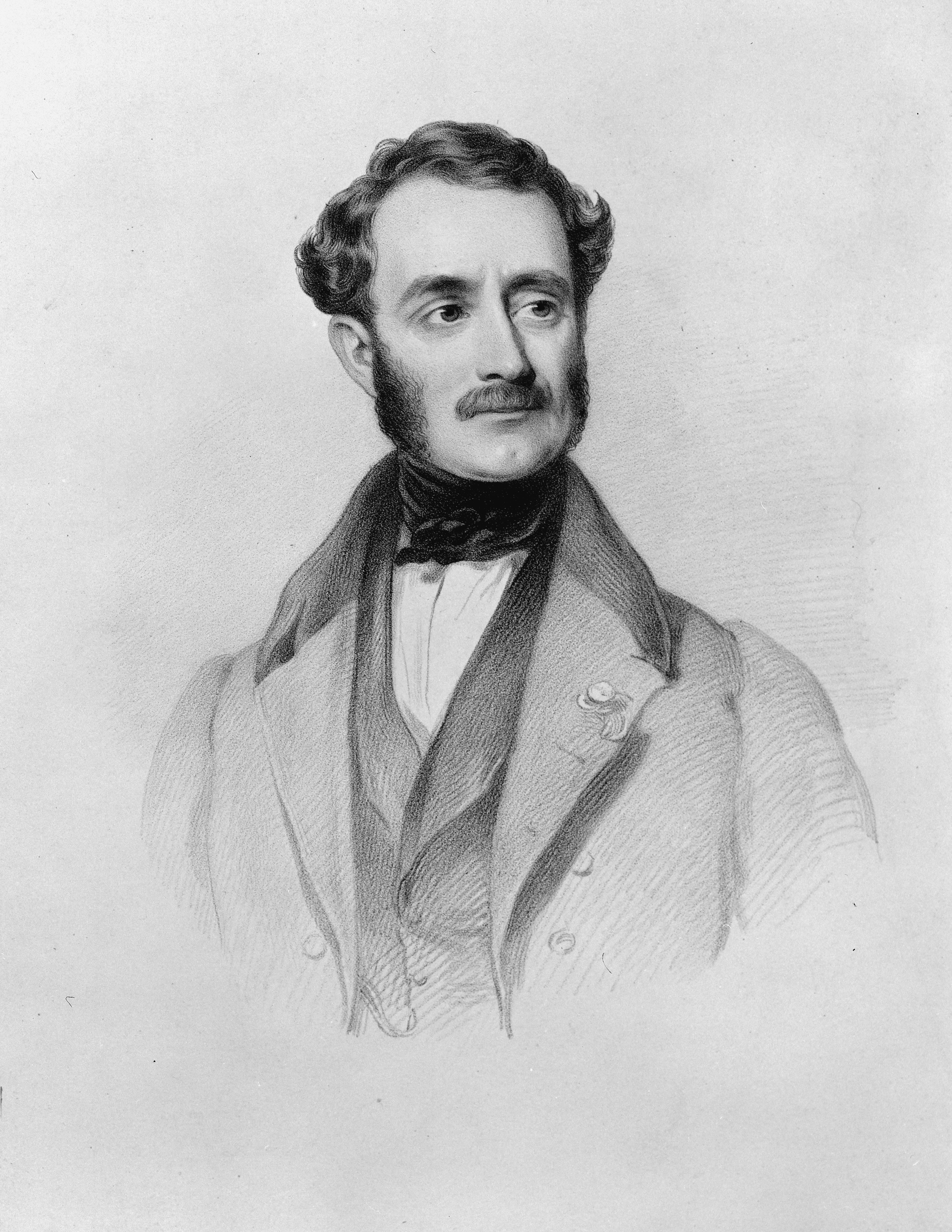
- 1840 portrait of Captain Joseph Thomas
- Born: June 1803; Lymington, Hampshire, England
- Died: year unknown death place unknown
- Occupations: Soldier, surveyor
- Known for: Surveyor for the New Zealand Company and Canterbury Association
- Military career
- Alma mater: Royal Military College, Sandhurst, 1819–1822
- Allegiance: United Kingdom
- Branch: British Army
- Service years: 1816–1833
- Rank: Lieutenant
- Units: 101st Regiment, 1816; 87th Regiment, 1822–1827; 19th Regiment, 1827–1833
- Campaigns: First Anglo-Burmese War; Ava, 1825

Captain Joseph Thomas (June 1803 – ?) was a British explorer and the chief surveyor for Lyttelton, Sumner and Christchurch in New Zealand. He took up surveying after service in the British army, gaining the rank of lieutenant. In the 1840s, he explored many parts of New Zealand and worked for the New Zealand Company. This gained him employment with the Canterbury Association, which sent him to New Zealand in 1848. Thomas' role was to find a suitable site for their proposed settlement, and what became the Canterbury region with Christchurch as its capital was the result of his efforts. He was dismissed in early 1851 over quarrels with John Robert Godley, the agent of the Canterbury Association, just after the first settlers had arrived in the colony. Thomas' life after 1853 is unknown. Having allowed for Hagley Park as a generous central city green space is regarded as his major achievement, and it is his lasting legacy.

== Early life ==
Thomas was born in Lymington, England, in June 1803. At age 13, he was an ensign in the 101st Regiment of Foot (Duke of York's Irish) from 15 February 1816 to its disbandment that year. In 1819, he was admitted to the Royal Military College, Sandhurst and in November 1822, he joined the 87th Regiment of Foot. He served in India and in November 1827 transferred to the 19th (1st Yorkshire, North Riding) Regiment of Foot for service in the West Indies. Thomas advanced to the rank of lieutenant on 23 August 1825, left the army in 1833, worked in North and South America as a surveyor and mining engineer and returned to England in 1839.

On his return to England, he published, in 1839, a collection of drawings made on his journeys. Any further reference to this work is scant. Art historian Alfredo Boulton noted that Joseph Thomas appears to have entered and departed Venezuela somewhat frequently within the years 1837–1844. Thomas' drawing, View of the City of Caracas from the Calvary, lithographed by W. Wood and published by Ackermann & Co., London, on 1 January 1839, and reproduced as Vista de la ciudad de Caracas in 1851, includes an index of the city's important churches, convents and private houses.

== New Zealand ==
Thomas purchased land in Wellington from the New Zealand Company and arrived there on the Adelaide on 7 March 1840. As the land proved to be unavailable, he ventured into fishing and whaling, but in 1841 accepted a survey position under William Mein Smith. Thomas undertook work in Wanganui and Porirua, but together with most of his colleagues, he was sacked by chief surveyor Samuel Brees in March 1843. In the following year, he was engaged to undertake survey work in the Otago region under Frederick Tuckett, but the work was postponed and he explored parts of the North Island instead.

=== Canterbury surveys ===
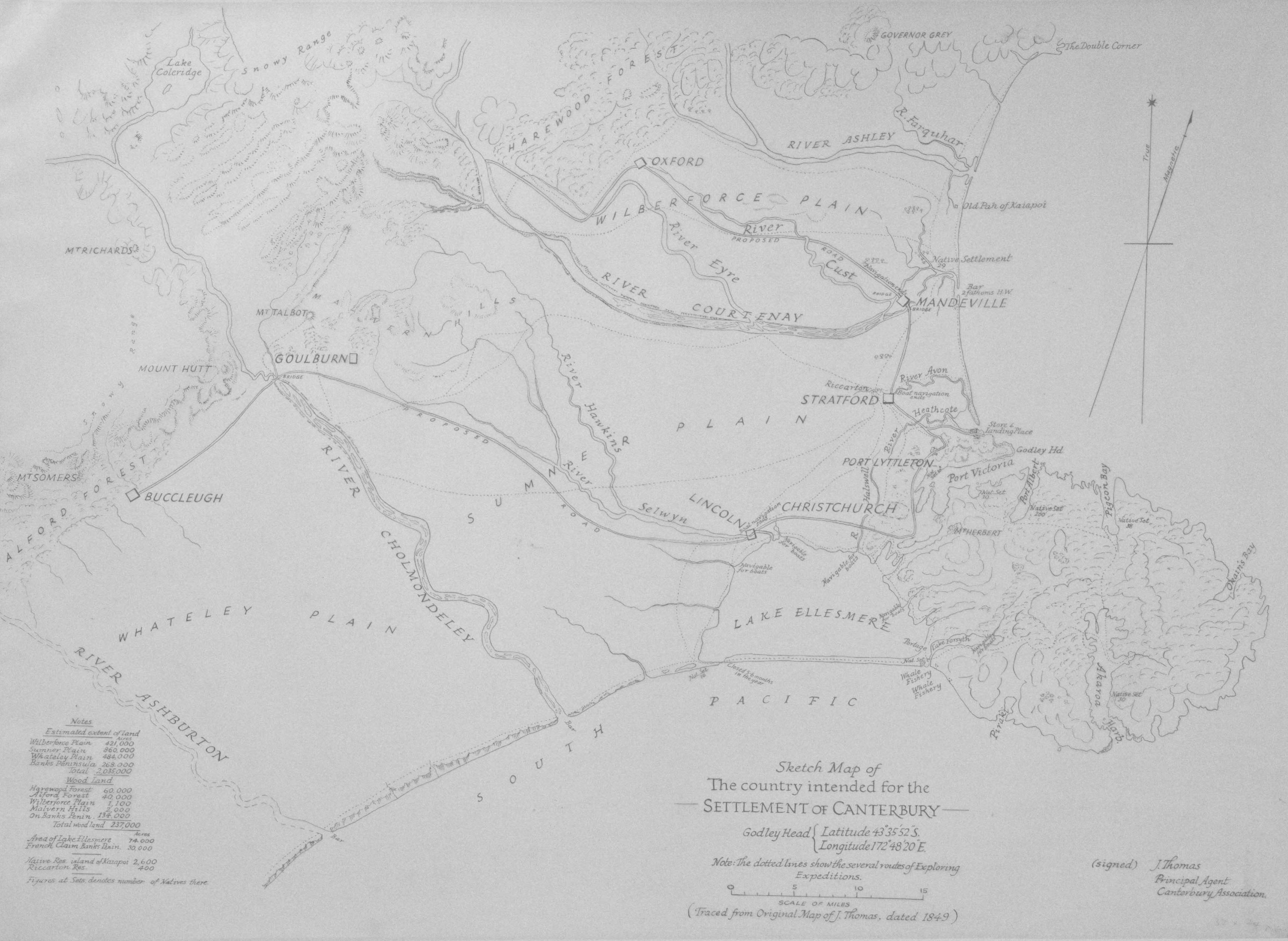
Mid-1849 map of Canterbury by Thomas, showing Christchurch located at the head of Lyttelton Harbour / Whakaraupō

He returned to England and soon after in 1848 was appointed by the Canterbury Association as their chief surveyor for their planned settlement in Canterbury. His formal employer was the New Zealand Company, as the Canterbury Association had not received its charter. He left England on 6 July 1848 together with the surveyors Thomas Cass and Charles Torlesse, and arrived in Nelson on 5 November. Thomas' remit included to find the site of the settlement anywhere in New Zealand, and it appears that the Canterbury Association expected that land in the Wairarapa be taken up, but he was instructed to obtain the consent of both the Governor (George Grey) and of Bishop Selwyn. Other instructions to Thomas included that the settlement should have a land area of at least 1,000,000 acres (4,000 km^{2}), with at least 300,000 acres (1,200 km^{2}) of that available for agriculture. The settlement could be at the coast or inland, but any coastal settlement required a good harbour, and the port should preferably be the capital. The capital was to be called Christchurch.

Thomas may have had preconceived ideas about the location of the desired settlement, as he mentioned to a Nelson settler that the question is about "Port Cooper or nothing", with the name referring to what is now known as Lyttelton. In Nelson, he organised a copy of the report written by George Duppa of his 1841 exploration of Port Cooper and the adjacent plains. He reported to the Canterbury Organisation that the land question between Kaikōura and Otago had been resolved (through Kemp's Deed, where the New Zealand Company had bought the land of the Māori), whereas the government was still trying to purchase the land in the Wairarapa from the Māori, hence lessening delays "should we decide on Port Cooper".

Sortable and collapsible table
Name given by Thomas	Named for	Canterbury Association member	Present name
Buccleugh	Duke of Buccleuch	yes	Buccleuch (locality)
Christchurch	Christchurch	no	Christchurch, but originally placed at present-day Teddington
Godley Head	John Robert Godley	yes	Awaroa / Godley Head
Goulburn	Henry Goulburn	yes	the town was not built
Governor Grey	George Grey	no	Mount Grey / Maukatere
Harewood Forest	Earl of Harewood	yes	Oxford Forest
Lake Coleridge	Edward Coleridge and William Coleridge	yes	Lake Coleridge
Lake Ellesmere	Francis Egerton	yes	Lake Ellesmere / Te Waihora
Lake Forsyth	William Forsyth	yes	Lake Forsyth / Wairewa
Lincoln	Earl of Lincoln	yes	Lincoln, but originally placed near the mouth of the Selwyn River / Waikirikiri
Malvern Hills	Possibly named after Malvern, Worcestershire, where Wakefield first met Godley and thus laid the foundation of Canterbury	no	Malvern Hills
Mandeville	Viscount Mandeville	yes	the town was not built
Mount Herbert	Sidney Herbert	yes	Mount Herbert / Te Ahu Patiki
Mount Hutt	John Hutt	yes	Mount Hutt
Mount Richards	George Kettilby Rickards	yes	Steepface Hill
Mount Somers	Thomas Somers-Cocks	yes	Mount Somers / Te Kiekie
Mount Talbot	John Talbot	yes	Mount Talbot
Oxford	Unclear; either Samuel Wilberforce (Bishop of Oxford), or Oxford in England, or University of Oxford	unclear	Oxford
Port Albert	Prince Albert	no	Port Levy / Koukourarata
Port Lyttelton	George Lyttelton	yes	Lyttelton, but originally placed at present-day Rāpaki
Port Victoria	Queen Victoria	no	Lyttelton Harbour / Whakaraupō
River Ashburton	Baron Ashburton	yes	Ashburton River / Hakatere
River Ashley	Anthony Ashley-Cooper	yes	Ashley River / Rakahuri
River Cholmondeley	William Cholmondeley	yes	Rakaia River
River Courtenay	William Courtenay	yes	Waimakariri River
River Cust	Edward Cust	yes	Cust River
River Eyre	Edward John Eyre	no	Eyre River
River Farquhar	Walter Farquhar	yes	Saltwater Creek
River Halswell	Edmund Halswell	yes	Halswell River / Huritini
River Hawkins	Ernest Hawkins	yes	Hawkins River
River Heathcote	William Heathcote	yes	Ōpāwaho / Heathcote River
River Selwyn	Bishop Selwyn	no	Selwyn River / Waikirikiri
Snowy Range	descriptive name only	no	?
Stratford	Stratford-upon-Avon, the birthplace of William Shakespeare	no	the site was used for Christchurch
Sumner Plain	John Sumner	yes	Canterbury Plains
Whateley Plains	Richard Whately	yes	Canterbury Plains
Wilberforce Plain	Robert Wilberforce and Samuel Wilberforce	yes	Canterbury Plains

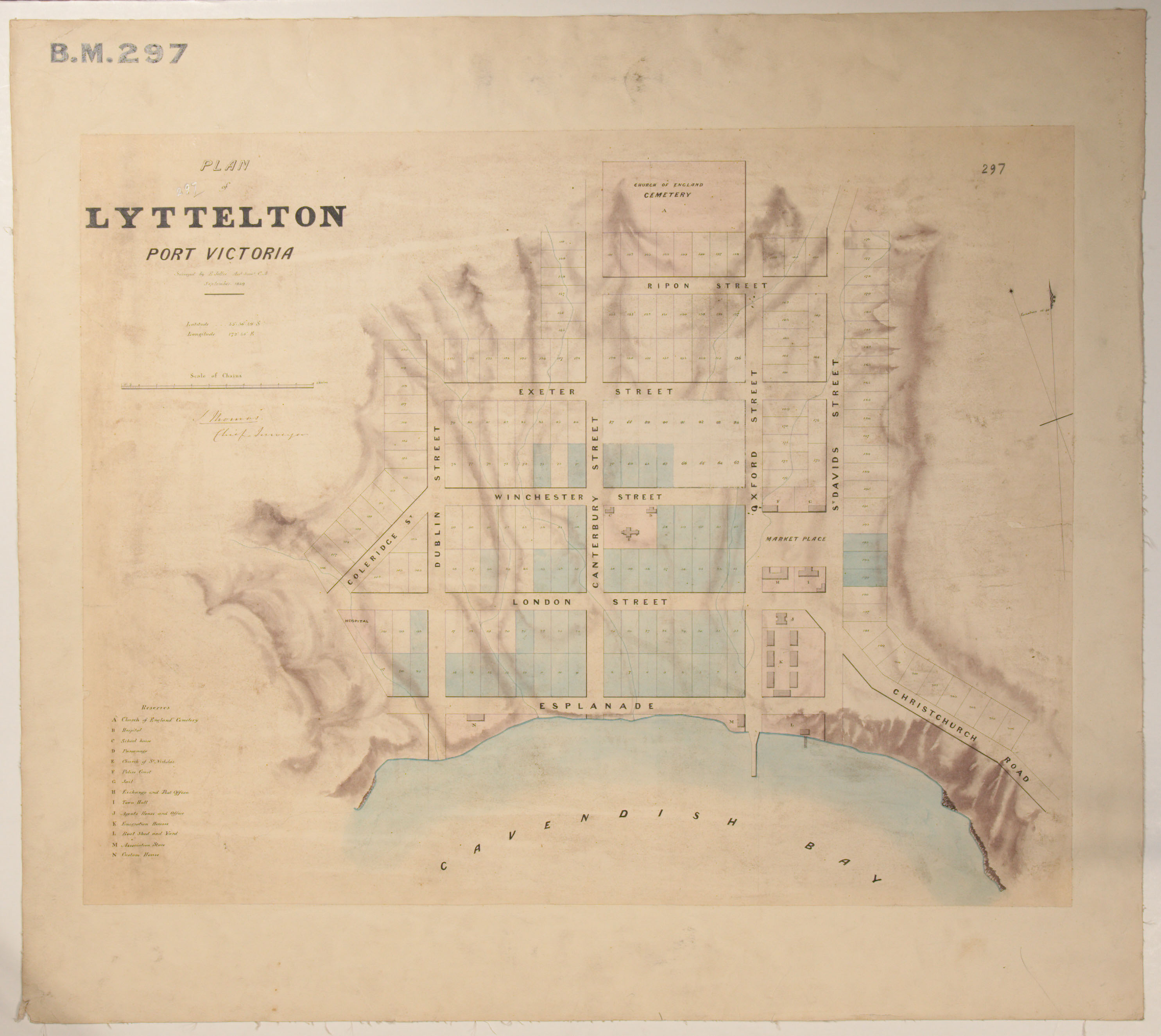
Black Map of Lyttelton from September 1849

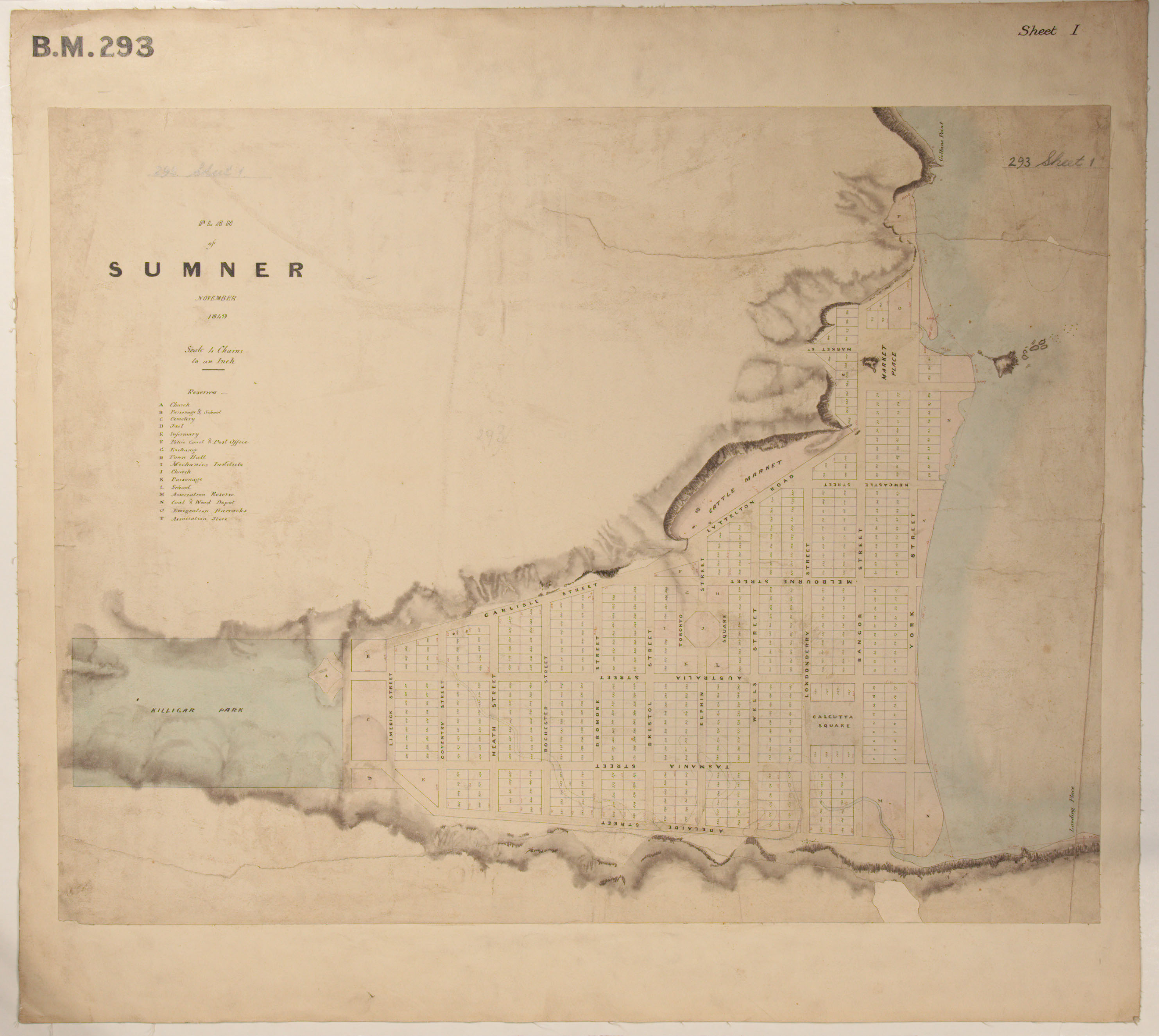
Black Map of Sumner from November 1849

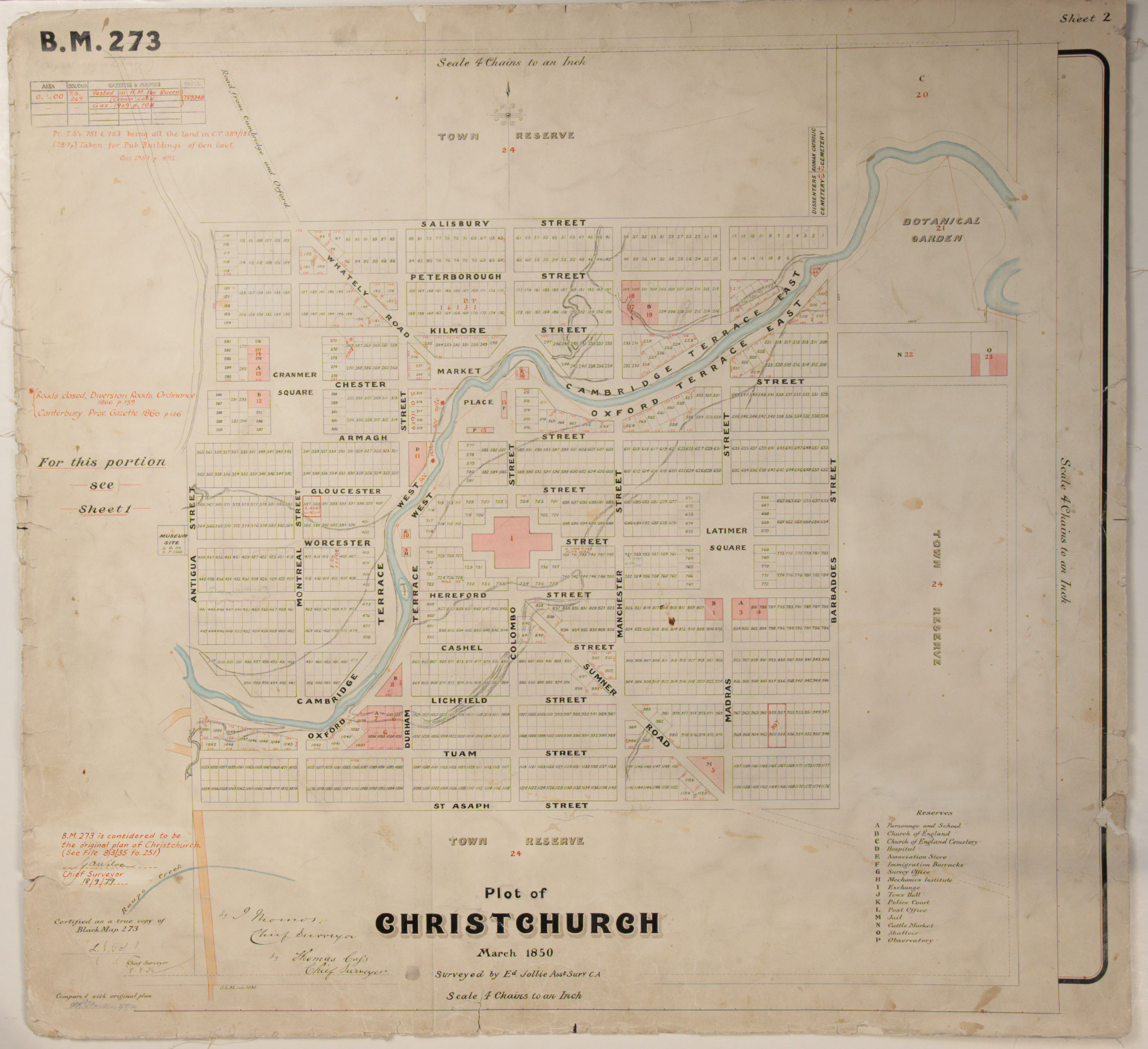
Black Map of Christchurch from March 1850

Thomas went to Wellington next, where he arrived on 21 November 1848. He met with the governor, who advised him that Captain John Lort Stokes of HMS Acheron had just finished a survey of the coast of Hawke's Bay, and that he had instructed him to survey the coast near Port Cooper. William Fox as the New Zealand Company's agent accompanied the three surveyors on the journey, and they reached Port Cooper on 15 December 1848. They undertook a very thorough exploration of the various parts of what is now Canterbury, from near the Waipara River in the north to the Ashburton River / Hakatere in the south, from the coast to the foothills of the Southern Alps. Thomas himself explored Banks Peninsula on foot and went to Port Levy, Pigeon Bay, Akaroa, Little River and back via the inland shore of Lake Ellesmere / Te Waihora. Their own report was supplemented by a report from the Deans brothers, who at that time were the only white settlers on the Canterbury Plains, with their farm located at Riccarton. Thomas and Fox jointly approved land holdings for two parties of settlers already in the area, who had paid for land in the Wellington area which had not been available. The Deans brothers were granted 400 acres (160 ha), and the Rhodes brothers (William Barnard and George) were granted 450 acres (180 ha) in Purau. Fox reported the following to T. C. Harrington, the secretary of the New Zealand Company:

Mr Thomas not only concurred in these arrangements, but was anxious to have them entered into, believing, as I do, that the presence of Messrs Deans and Mr George Rhodes with their stock and farms and their knowledge of climate, seasons, etc., will prove most valuable to the Canterbury immigrants in the early days of the settlement. They are all experienced settlers, hardy pioneers, and intelligent, respectable gentlemen.

Everything proved very satisfactory for a new settlement, and the only possible obstacle was whether the harbour itself was going to be part of the land claim that the French initiative that resulted in the settlement of Akaroa had made. Fox applied to the governor for a ruling. During May 1849, both the Bishop and the Governor gave their approvals of the settlement for the Canterbury Association, and Grey thus confirmed that Port Cooper was not going to be part of the French land claim any longer.

To conform with his instructions, Thomas initially placed the settlement's capital at the head of Lyttelton Harbour / Whakaraupō at the present-day Teddington. To meet the required 1,000 acres (4.0 km^{2}) for Christchurch, partial reclamation would have been necessary. The Botanic Gardens were to be placed at what is now Charteris Bay, and the Government Domain was to be near present-day Governors Bay. But all of this was subject to the cost estimate for the land reclamation being affordable, which it was not.

Thomas' first sketch map from 1849 commemorated about 30 members of the Canterbury Association. A reproduction of his sketch map is shown above, and the table identifies the localities named by him, together with their present name. Notable names that have changed were two major rivers, the Courtenay (now Waimakariri) and Cholmondley (now Rakaia). The Avon River had already been named by the Deans Brothers; Godley was instructed in 1850 by the Canterbury Association to rename it as the Shakespeare River, but the original use prevailed. Thomas' intention was to initially build four towns: Lyttelton was to be the port town, placed at present-day Rāpaki, Christchurch was to go at the head of the harbour, Stratford was to be built at that point on the Avon River that could just be reached by boat, and Mandeville would be placed on a large island within the Courtenay (Waimakari) River.

It was quickly realised that land reclamation at the head of the harbour was too expensive, and the capital Christchurch was instead placed at the location that had been earmarked for Stratford. Mandeville was never built, and the land at Rāpaki was not available, as it had been promised to Maori as a reserve. Sites for other town, to be built later, were identified for Lincoln (near where the Selwyn River / Waikirikiri flows into Lake Ellesmere / Te Waihora; it was later built in a different location), Oxford (where the college was supposed to be located; the college was built in Christchurch instead), and Buccleugh (which was never built, but which exists as an uninhabited locality named Buccleuch at 43.6890°S 171.4395°E).

The three towns that were surveyed were first Lyttelton, then Sumner, and lastly Christchurch. Except for early survey work in Lyttelton, which was done by Thomas and Torlesse, the work was done by Edward Jollie, who explains in his diary how the streets got their names:

The names of the streets of the three towns I surveyed were taken from Bishoprics and the way it was done was this; as soon as I completed the map I took it to Thomas who putting on his gold spectacles and opening his would read out a Bishop's name to hear if it sounded well. If I agreed with him that it did, I put the name to one of the streets requiring baptism. Lyttelton being the first born town got the best names for its streets, Sumner being next had the next best and Christchurch being the youngest had to be content with chiefly Irish and Colonial bishoprics as names for its streets. This accounts for, what to anyone not knowing the circumstances, appears strange, viz: that many of the best English Bishoprics are not represented while Irish and Colonial ones are. Sumner in fact died too late for the names there used to be again employed in Christchurch.

What Jollie referred to with 'Sumner dying' refers to the fact that the survey was not used, as Godley put the proposal on hold. Instead, the land in Sumner was sold as a rural block. When it was subdivided in the 1860s, the original survey was not used.

Thomas was also tasked with organising and supervising the work that was necessary to prepare the settlement for the settlers. Work was under way on the road from Lyttelton to Sumner when John Robert Godley arrived in April 1850. Godley was the agent for the Canterbury Association, and he put an immediate stop to the works, as available funds had been used up; instead, a walking track was built over the Port Hills that became known as the Bridle Path. When the first settlers arrived from December 1850 on the First Four Ships, Thomas was blamed for the unfinished work. There was constant tension between Thomas and Godley, and Thomas was dismissed by the agent of the Canterbury Association in January 1851. Some of the most severe criticism was that there was no church for the settlers, but after the first church was completed in May 1852, an editorial in the Lyttelton Times defended his decision to focus on the necessary infrastructure first.

== Later years ==
Thomas moved to Wellington and applied for land in the North Island. Instead, he left for Margate / London, England, on 6 April 1852 on board the Midlothian to plead his case to the management committee of the Canterbury Association but nothing came of this. During the year in England, he married. He returned to New Zealand and in 1853, he sold his assets to take employment with a mining company in New South Wales, Australia. He returned to England by the steamer Lady Jocelyn which sailed from Sydney, via Melbourne, for Southampton on 23 September 1854.

It is not known exactly what he did after this; according to some reports, he died while in Wellington sometime during the 1880s, whilst others say that he died in Victoria, Australia at an unknown date.
