= King Billy Island =

Island in Lyttelton Harbour, New Zealand

Native name: Aua
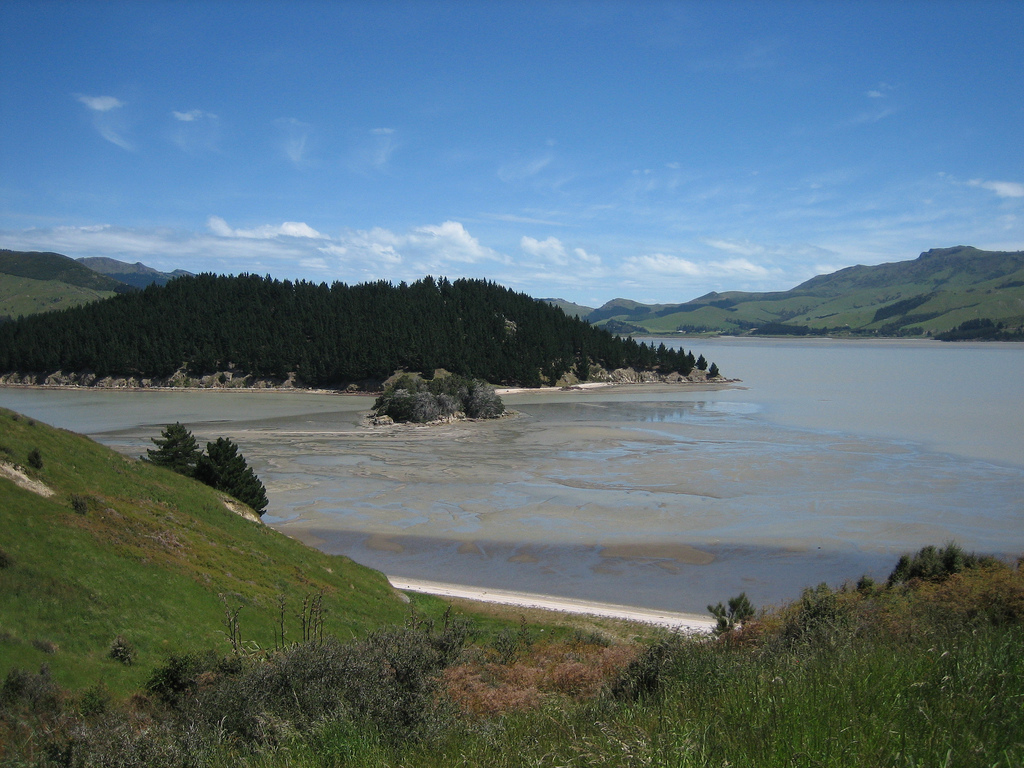
- A view from Ōtamahua / Quail Island at low tide, with the small King Billy Island seen in front of the wooded Moepuku Point
- Interactive map of King Billy Island

Geography
- Location: Lyttelton Harbour / Whakaraupō
- Coordinates: 43°38′06″S 172°41′09″E
- Area: 3,642 m^{2} (39,200 sq ft)
- Length: 122 m (400 ft)
- Width: 72 m (236 ft)

Administration
- New Zealand
- Region: Canterbury

King Billy Island (Māori: Aua; officially Aua / King Billy Island) is a small island and Scenic Reserve in Lyttelton Harbour / Whakaraupō on Banks Peninsula, New Zealand.

== Location and description ==
The island is situated between Ōtamahua / Quail Island (some 300 metres (980 ft) away) and Moepuku Point, a peninsula between Teddington and Charteris Bay, off Banks Peninsula.

The island is approximately 122 metres (400 ft) long and 72 metres (236 ft) metres wide, covering an estimated 3,642 square metres (39,200 sq ft) at mean high water mark. It is composed of Charteris Bay Sandstone, with a thin layer of soil supporting forest.

== Name ==
The Māori name is considered to mean "no name". The origin of the English name is unknown: it might refer to a comic book character, King William IV, or an Aboriginal Australian whaler Billy Lanny.

== History ==
Archaeological sites are recorded on the island showing evidence of quarries, landing sites, and middens. In pre-European times, the island was a source for Māori of coarse sandstone used for grinding stone including pounamu (greenstone). As such the island has cultural significance to Ngāi Tahu, especially to Te Hapū o Ngāti Wheke, based at Te Rāpaki-o-Te Rakiwhakaputa. This sandstone was later quarried by colonists for the corners and facing of the Lyttelton Gaol, among other buildings.

The area was included in Walter Mantell's controversial securing of the harbour (then called Port Cooper) and surrounding land for the Crown in 1849. In April 1858, the island was part of a purchase by Mark Stoddart, and was subsequently sold to Thomas Potts, then to William Rolleston for public purposes. It was owned by the Anderson until 1975, then sold to the Crown. In 1979 it was classified as a Recreation Reserve, but in 1980 this was changed to a Scenic Reserve.

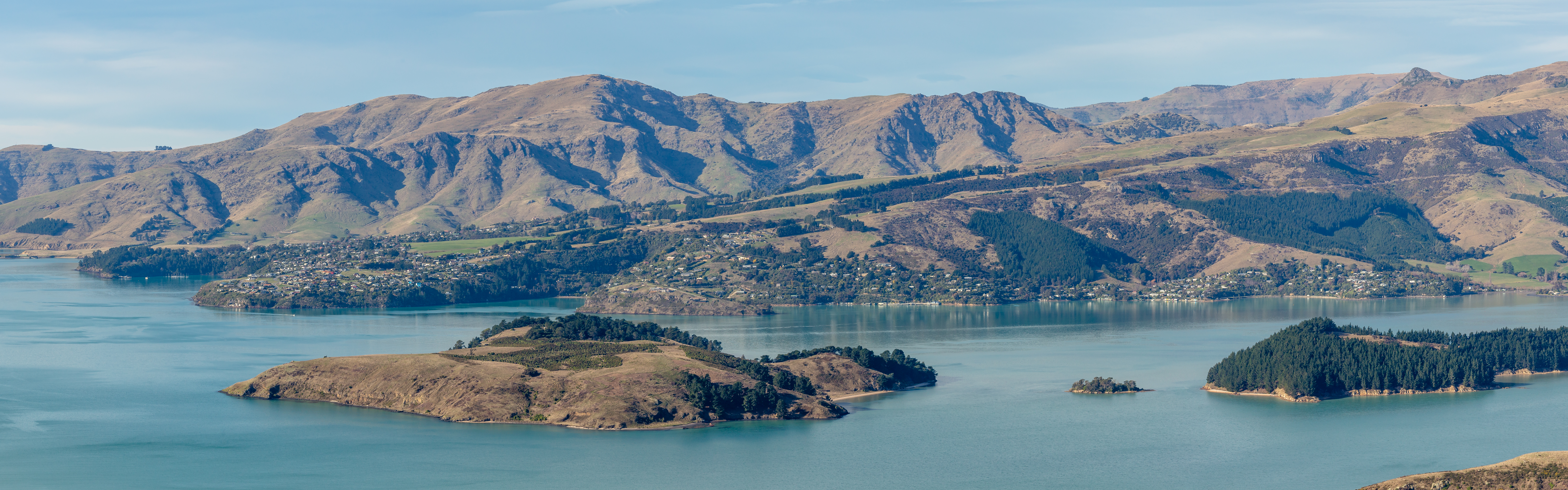
Panorama of Diamond Harbour. King Billy Island can be seen on the right side of much bigger Ōtamahua / Quail Island.

== See also ==
- List of islands of New Zealand
- List of islands
- Desert island
