= Teddington, New Zealand =

Settlement in Christchurch, New Zealand

Teddington
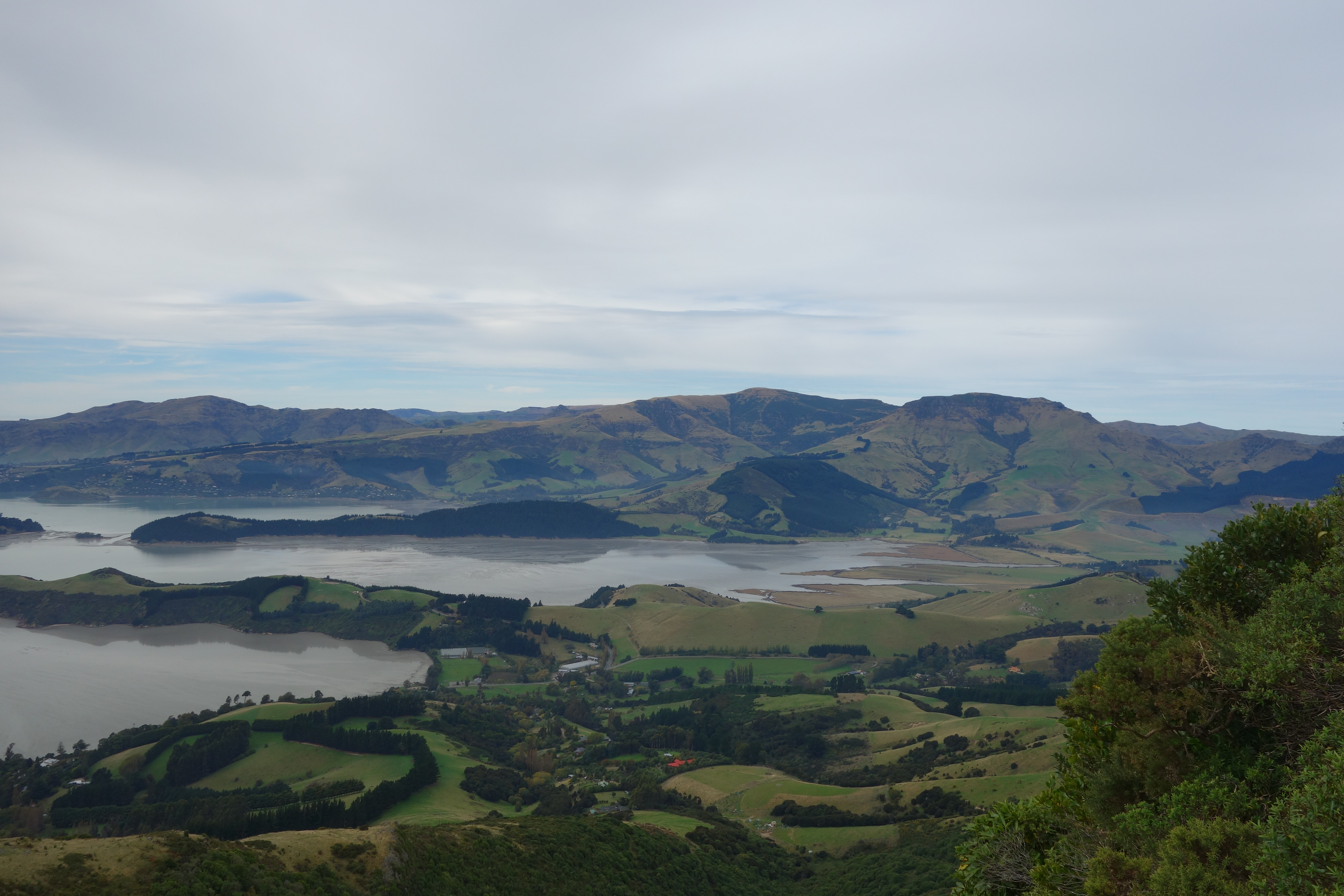
- Looking northeast, with Head of the Bay in the lower left of the picture and Te Wharae / Charteris Bay in the centre
- Interactive map of Teddington
- Coordinates: 43°40′06.24″S 172°39′40.81″E
- Country: New Zealand
- Region: Canterbury
- Local authority: Christchurch City Council
- Ward: Banks Peninsula
- Community: Te Pātaka o Rākaihautū Banks Peninsula
- Electorates: Banks Peninsula; Te Tai Tonga (Māori)

Government
  - Territorial Authority: Christchurch City Council
  - Regional council: Environment Canterbury
  - Mayor of Christchurch: Phil Mauger
  - Banks Peninsula MP: Vanessa Weenink
  - Te Tai Tonga MP: Tākuta Ferris

Area
  - Total: 20.80 km^{2} (8.03 sq mi)

Population (2023 census)
  - Total: 153
  - Density: 7.36/km^{2} (19.1/sq mi)
- Time zone: UTC+12 (NZST)
  - Summer (DST): UTC+13 (NZDT)

Teddington is a very small community on Banks Peninsula at the head of Lyttelton Harbour / Whakaraupō. It sits on the junction of the road to Gebbies Pass and the road from Purau to Christchurch.

It dates back to the early settlers of Christchurch but is now reduced to a pub and a restored working blacksmith's forge.

A school opened at Teddington (then called Gebbies Flat) in 1864. It may have been replaced by the school which opened on Governors Bay Road in 1868.

== Tsunami ==
An earthquake near Chile on 23 May 1960 caused a tsunami which crossed the Pacific to hit New Zealand. The tsunami was funnelled up Lyttelton Harbour and flooded low-lying farmland and the Wheatsheaf Tavern in Teddington. A similar event occurred in 2010 following an earthquake in Chile with three waves that were greater than two metres high inundating the head of the harbour around Teddington.

An earlier tsunami occurred in 1868 following an earthquake off the coast of Peru. This caused an eight foot high wave to be funneled up Lyttelton Harbour towards Teddington.

== Demographics ==
Teddington locality covers 20.80 km^{2} (8.03 sq mi) and includes Allandale. It is part of the larger Teddington statistical area.

Historical population for the locality
Year	Pop.	±% p.a.
2006	144	—
2013	144	+0.00%
2018	156	+1.61%
2023	153	−0.39%

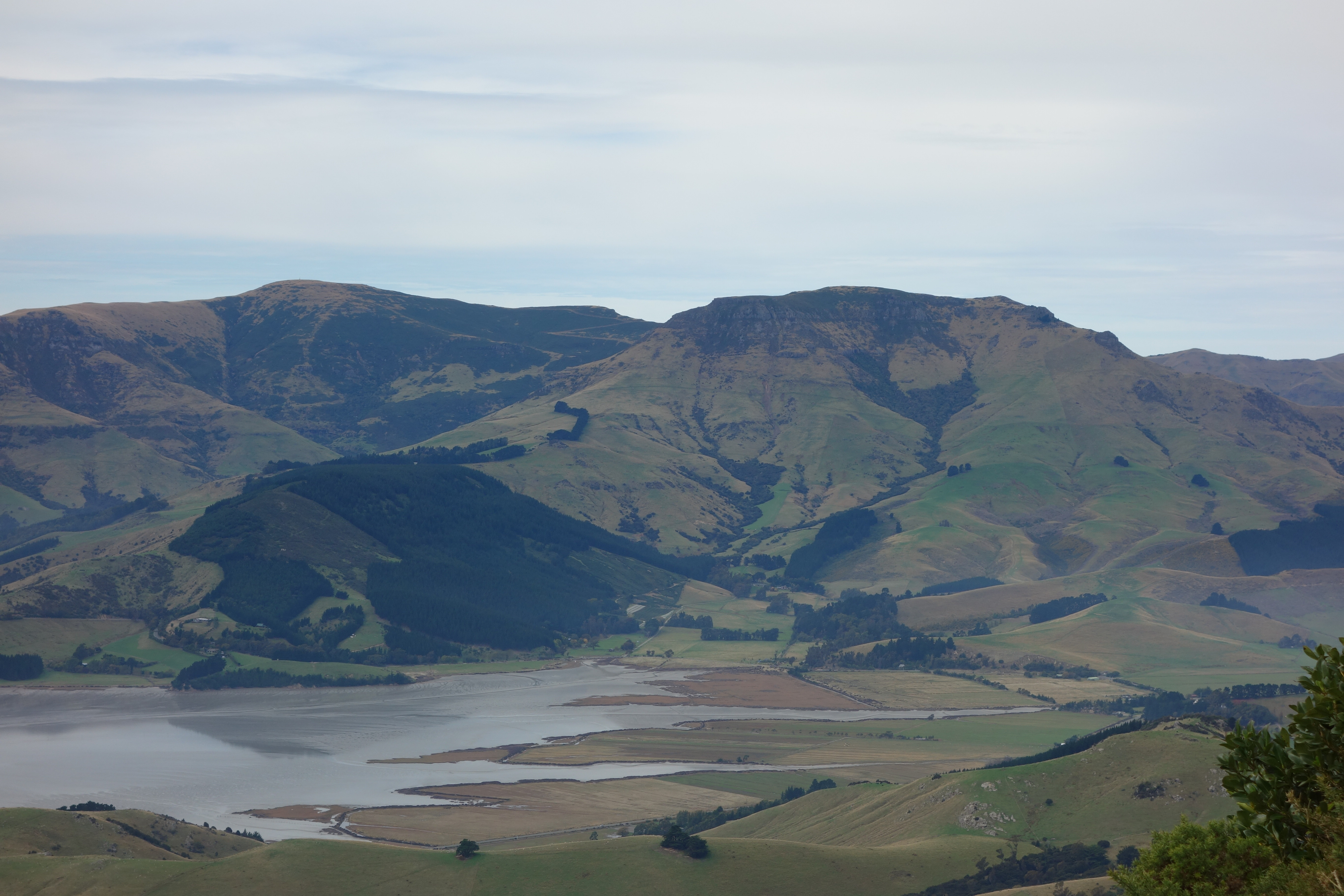
Teddington is on the lower right side of this photograph

The locality had a population of 153 in the 2023 New Zealand census, a decrease of 3 people (−1.9%) since the 2018 census, and an increase of 9 people (6.2%) since the 2013 census. There were 75 males and 75 females in 63 dwellings. 3.9% of people identified as LGBTIQ+. The median age was 48.2 years (compared with 38.1 years nationally). There were 27 people (17.6%) aged under 15 years, 21 (13.7%) aged 15 to 29, 75 (49.0%) aged 30 to 64, and 30 (19.6%) aged 65 or older.

People could identify as more than one ethnicity. The results were 94.1% European (Pākehā); 11.8% Māori; 3.9% Pasifika; 2.0% Asian; and 3.9% Middle Eastern, Latin American and African New Zealanders (MELAA). English was spoken by 100.0%, Māori by 2.0%, and other languages by 17.6%. The percentage of people born overseas was 23.5, compared with 28.8% nationally.

Religious affiliations were 25.5% Christian, 2.0% Jewish, and 2.0% other religions. People who answered that they had no religion were 60.8%, and 9.8% of people did not answer the census question.

Of those at least 15 years old, 54 (42.9%) people had a bachelor's or higher degree, 54 (42.9%) had a post-high school certificate or diploma, and 12 (9.5%) people exclusively held high school qualifications. The median income was $47,000, compared with $41,500 nationally. 24 people (19.0%) earned over $100,000 compared to 12.1% nationally. The employment status of those at least 15 was 60 (47.6%) full-time and 30 (23.8%) part-time.

=== Teddington statistical area ===
The Teddington statistical area, which extends from Governors Bay almost to Purau and includes Ōtamahua / Quail Island, covers 47.42 km^{2} (18.31 sq mi). It had an estimated population of 260 as of June 2025, with a population density of 5.5 people per km^{2}.

Historical population for the statistical area
Year	Pop.	±% p.a.
2006	207	—
2013	198	−0.63%
2018	234	+3.40%
2023	246	+1.01%
The 2006 population is for a smaller area of 46.15 km^{2}. Source:

Teddington statistical area had a population of 246 in the 2023 New Zealand census, an increase of 12 people (5.1%) since the 2018 census, and an increase of 48 people (24.2%) since the 2013 census. There were 117 males and 126 females in 99 dwellings. 3.7% of people identified as LGBTIQ+. The median age was 48.5 years (compared with 38.1 years nationally). There were 42 people (17.1%) aged under 15 years, 33 (13.4%) aged 15 to 29, 120 (48.8%) aged 30 to 64, and 51 (20.7%) aged 65 or older.

People could identify as more than one ethnicity. The results were 95.1% European (Pākehā); 7.3% Māori; 3.7% Pasifika; 1.2% Asian; and 1.2% Middle Eastern, Latin American and African New Zealanders (MELAA). English was spoken by 98.8%, Māori by 1.2%, and other languages by 14.6%. No language could be spoken by 1.2% (e.g. too young to talk). The percentage of people born overseas was 23.2, compared with 28.8% nationally.

Religious affiliations were 26.8% Christian, 1.2% Buddhist, 1.2% Jewish, and 1.2% other religions. People who answered that they had no religion were 62.2%, and 7.3% of people did not answer the census question.

Of those at least 15 years old, 93 (45.6%) people had a bachelor's or higher degree, 81 (39.7%) had a post-high school certificate or diploma, and 24 (11.8%) people exclusively held high school qualifications. The median income was $46,900, compared with $41,500 nationally. 36 people (17.6%) earned over $100,000 compared to 12.1% nationally. The employment status of those at least 15 was 96 (47.1%) full-time, 45 (22.1%) part-time, and 3 (1.5%) unemployed.

== St Peter's Anglican church ==
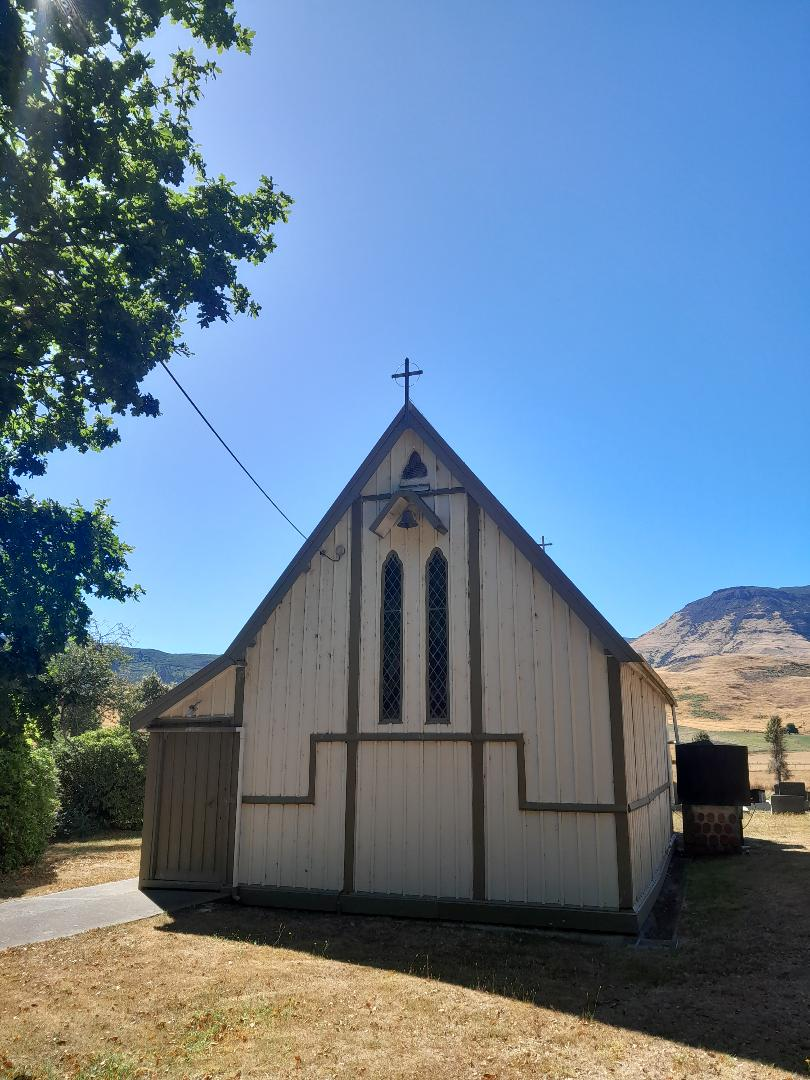
St Peter's Anglican Church, Teddington

St Peter's church is an Anglican church that was designed by the architect Benjamin Mountfort. It was opened in 1871, and the church was consecrated in 1885. The church can accommodate up to 80 parishioners. The church is built out of kauri and the floor is built out of matai.
