= Ōtamahua / Quail Island =

Island in New Zealand

Ōtamahua (Māori)
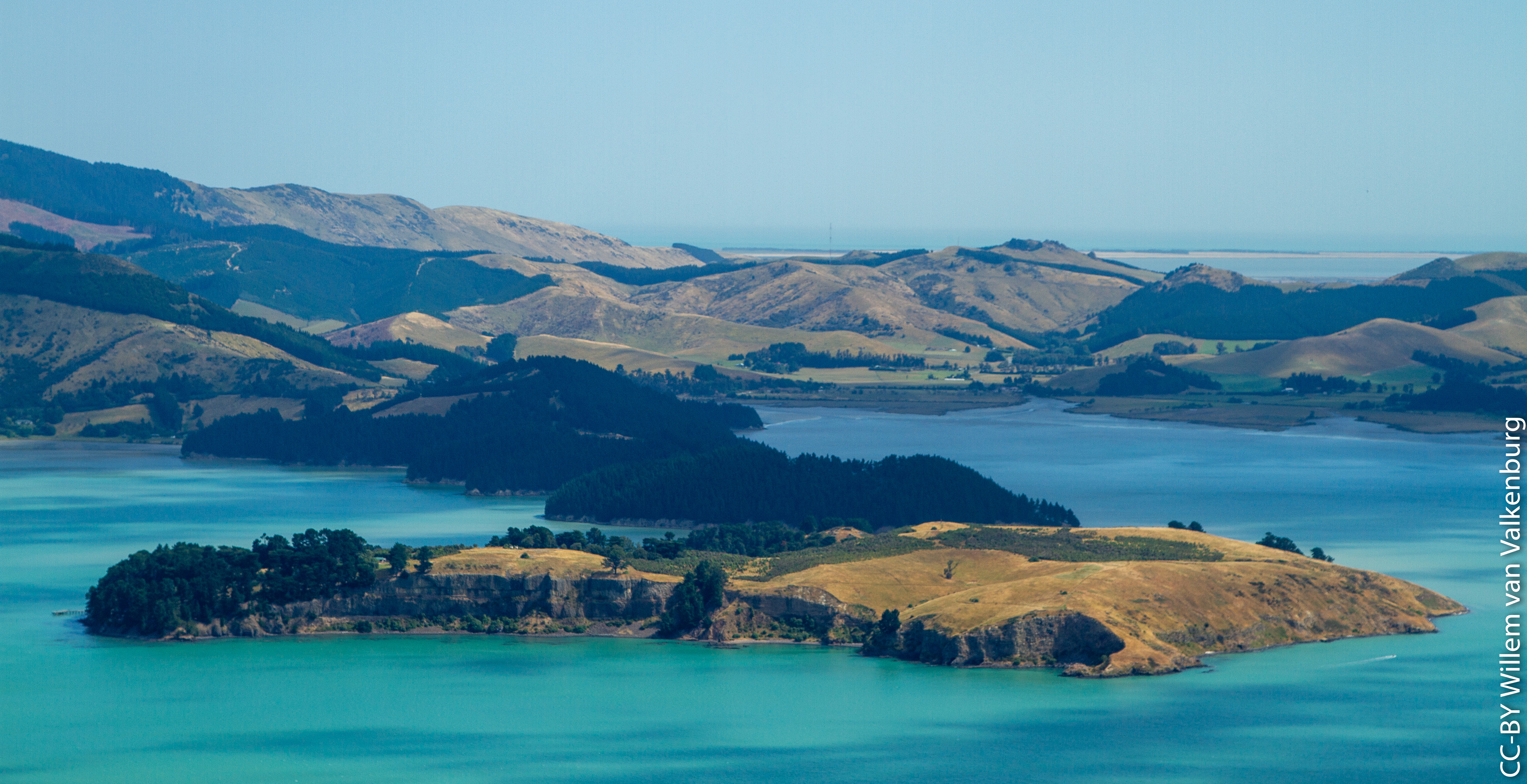
- View of Ōtamahua / Quail Island

- Location of Ōtamahua / Quail Island in Banks Peninsula

Geography
- Coordinates: 43.63°S 172.69°E
- Area: 0.8 km^{2} (0.31 sq mi)
- Highest elevation: 86 m (282 ft)

Administration
- New Zealand

Demographics
- Population: 0

Ōtamahua / Quail Island (Māori: Ōtamahua or Te Kawakawa) is an 81 ha (200 acres) uninhabited island within Lyttelton Harbour / Whakaraupō in the South Island of New Zealand, close to Christchurch. The island was given its European name by Captain William Mein Smith who saw native quail here in 1842; though they were already extinct by 1875. Ōtamahua means 'the place where children collect sea eggs'. Te Kawakawa refers to the pepper trees found on the island.

== History ==
=== Pre-European history ===
Ōtamahua was still often visited to collect shellfish, flax, bird's eggs as well as stone for tools (from Aua / King Billy Island, an outcrop just off Ōtamahua). Its significance to Te Hapū o Ngāti Wheke as a site for food gathering was acknowledged with the installation in 2019 of a 9-metre-tall (30 ft) pou whenua. This pillar was carved by Caine Tauwhare and named Te Hamo o Tū Te Rakiwhānoa: a hamo was a tool for planting kūmara.

=== Quarantine and leper colony ===
Europeans briefly farmed the island in 1851, before it was turned into a quarantine station in 1875, a hospital during the influenza epidemic of 1907, and a small leper colony from 1906 to 1925.

During its time as a leper colony, fourteen men were sent there, and two died there. Ivon Skelton arrived in 1919. Born in Apia, Samoa, he was visiting family on the West Coast in 1918 when he was diagnosed with leprosy. He and his cousin were put into isolation in Cobden, but while his cousin was released, Skelton was sent to Quail Island. He died there on 22 October 1923 at age 24, and was buried on the island. A small fence was put up around the grave in 1931. An attempt was made in 2015 to exhume the body, to save it from threatening erosion and to study the DNA of the disease as little was known about Pacific strains. However, two days of excavations found only a ceramic pot and glass bowl, perhaps used to hold flowers, and a large hole that had been filled with rocks, perhaps to protect the site from erosion.

Sam Te Iringa was brought to the island in late 1920 from Kirikau Pā, where only his niece had been willing to care for him. He found a run-down colony without a nurse. Due to the poor conditions he tried to organise a strike, but as the patients did no work, the strike was not effective. He died in January 1922 on a Friday afternoon, and was buried the next day by Lyttelton priest Father Patrick Cooney. The location of his grave is unknown.

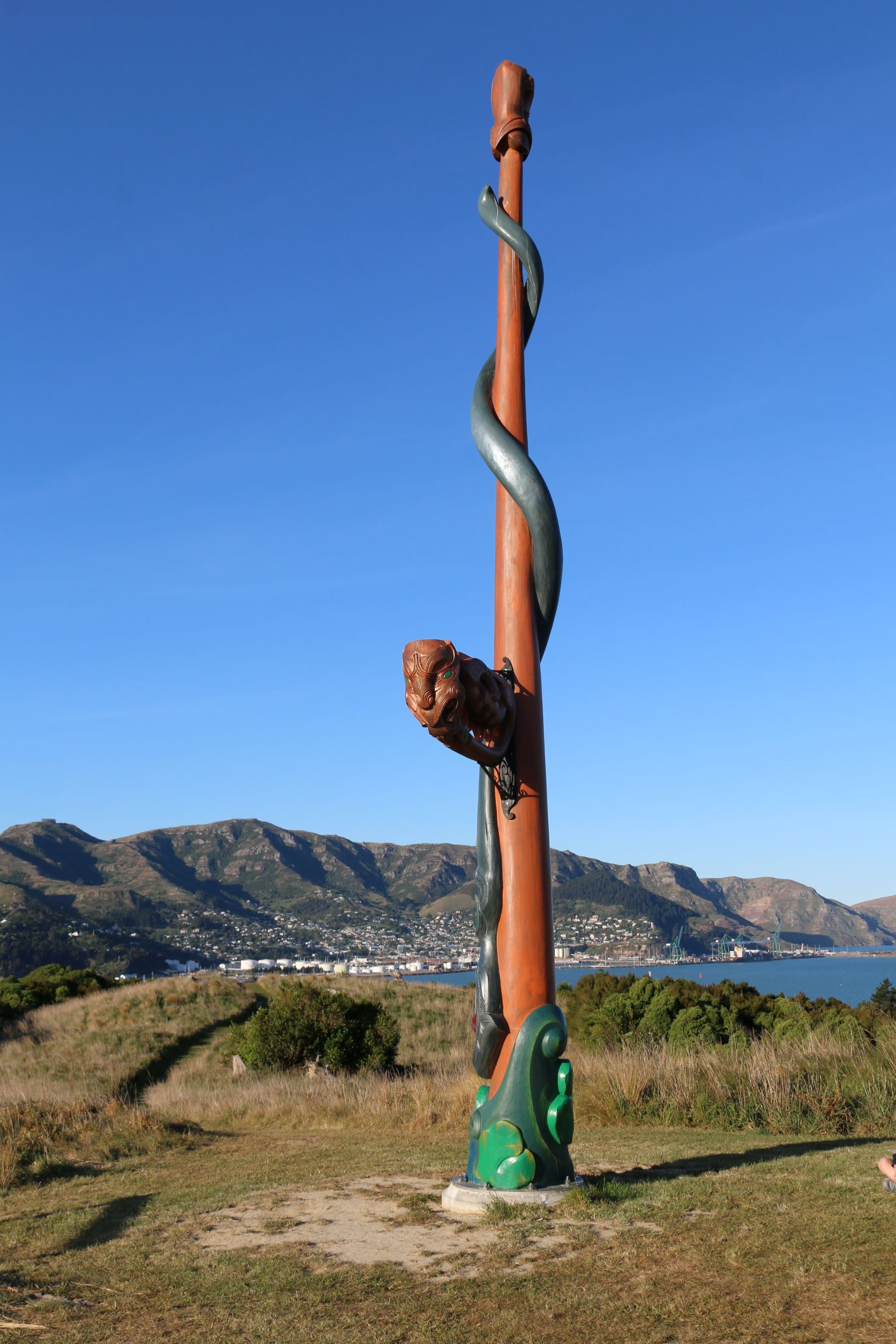
Te Hamo o Tū Te Rakiwhānoa, a pouwhenua or land post installed in 2019 at the summit of the island

Another patient George Phillips walked off the island at low tide in 1925, crossing the mud flats to Charteris Bay where he posed as a clergyman. From there he took a taxi to Christchurch, changed his surname to Freeman, and spent his last years in a boardinghouse in Petone. He died there in 1931.

Other leprosy patients included Jim Lord, Jim Kokiri, Pakira Matawai, Ah Pat, Ipirini Apa Apa, and Ah Yip. Will Vallance, from Queensland, had been diagnosed at age 30 and spent 19 years on the island. He was among the last eight patients who were moved off the island in 1925 to Makogai. In 1931 the patients' huts were pulled down, other buildings removed, and furniture sold. The attending doctor was Charles Upham, who would regularly visit from Lyttelton.

Animals were also quarantined on the island, separately from the leprosy patients. These were huskies, mules and ponies going to Antarctica on Robert Falcon Scott and Ernest Shackleton's expeditions. Subantarctic explorations that used Quail Island were the Discovery Expedition (1901–04), Nimrod Expedition (1907–09), Terra Nova Expedition (1910–13), and the Byrd Antarctic Expedition (1928–30).

Replicas of dog kennels (once used for training of the dogs used in Antarctic expeditions of the early 20th century) and a replica leprosy patient's hut were built by students of Cathedral College, with the quarantine barracks also restored and moved to the beach front.

== Ecological restoration ==
The island was declared a recreation reserve in 1975, prior to that it was working farm (sheep and potatoes) until the late 1970s by David Halliwell who also acted as the island's last live on caretaker.

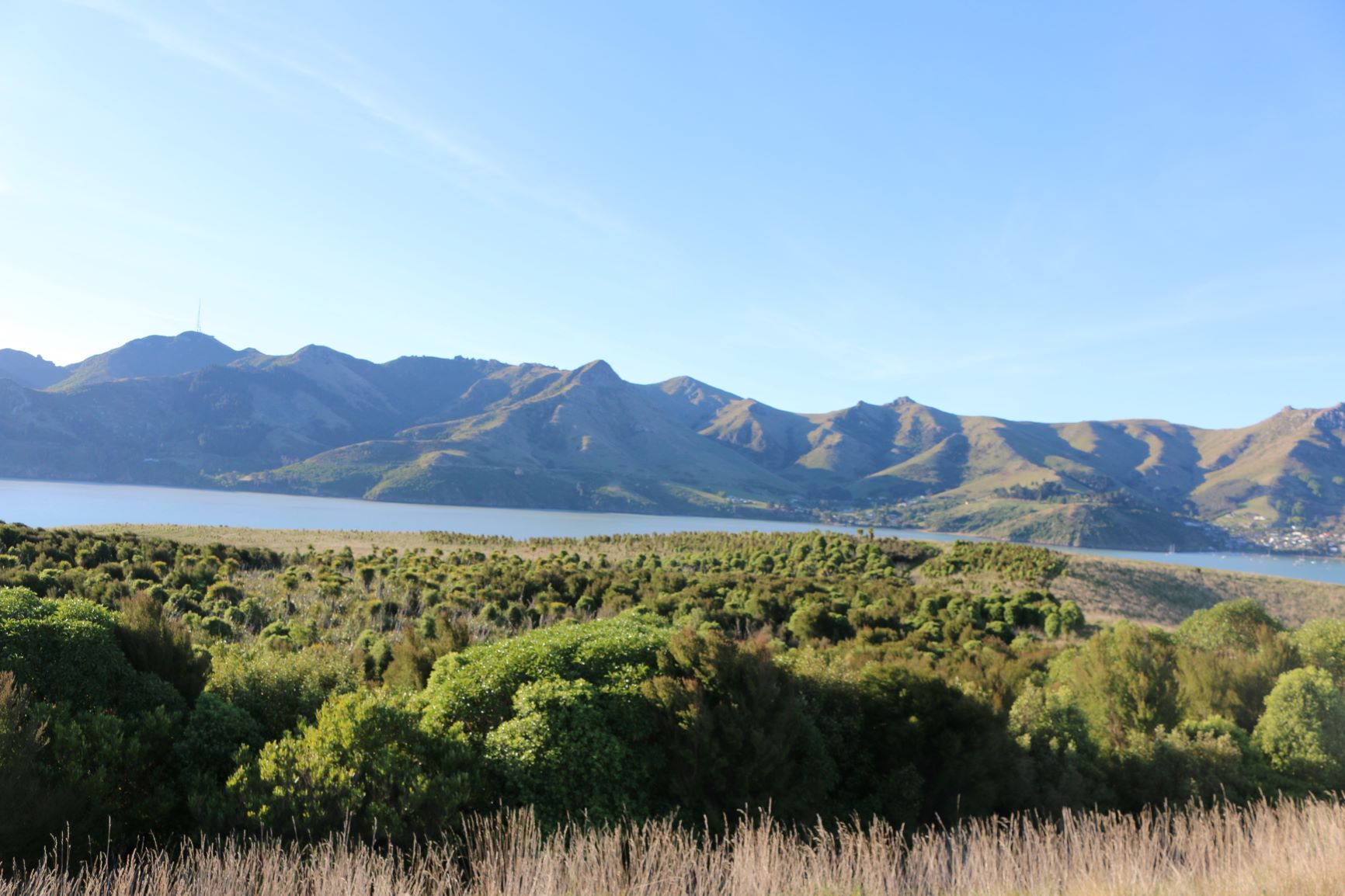
Regenerating native bush in October 2020

The Ōtamahua/Quail Island Ecological Restoration Trust and the Department of Conservation are currently working to remove pests and re-vegetate the island, with the aim of eventually re-introducing native wildlife. The Trust aims to restore 24 hectares (59 acres) of native forest to the island to provide a refuge for locally extinct, uncommon and threatened bird and invertebrate species of the Banks Peninsula region.

Community volunteers have been transformed large areas of the island from dry and desolate pest-ridden areas to a safe haven for indigenous species. The project is unique in the way it balances the recreational use and historical features of Ōtamahua / Quail Island while re-establishing the native ecosystems, both flora and fauna. Penguin nesting boxes have also been established on the island to provide a safe nesting site for the white-flippered penguin, an endangered Banks Peninsula native. The Trust organises fortnightly work parties on the island to undertake animal and weed pest control. An annual planting is undertaken each spring.

Since 1997, volunteers have eradicated rabbits, cats, hedgehogs, and ship rats from the island. A trap network on the mainland and the stepping-stone island to Ōtamahua aim to prevent reinvasion, but the island's inter-tidal link to the mainland make this likely, particularly by rodents.

The Trust's volunteers have planted more than 95,000 native trees and shrubs, established a nursery to propagate silver tussock, and eradicated all predators except mice. As a result, birds, invertebrates and rare plants have been reintroduced to the island. This includes korimako and kererū as well as Lepidium aegrum (Banks Peninsula scurvy grass), a "nationally critical" plant. Invertebrates translocated include a Banks Peninisula ground beetle Megadromus guerinii, Banks Peninsula tree weta Hemideina ricta, and the leaf-vein slug Pseudaneitea maculata.

== Visitors ==
About 16,000 people visit the island every year. Ōtamahua / Quail Island is the only substantial island in the Canterbury area accessible to the public. This island has a number of safe swimming beaches, as well as same-day facilities (toilets, day shelter). A ferry service is available to the island, and private watercraft may also access the island. The Ōtamahua/Quail Island Ecological Restoration Trust encourages and facilitates educational activities and relevant research on the natural features and cultural history of the island. Many schools and groups now visit the island to combine outdoor activities with their studies of the natural environment. It is possible to stay the night on the island. The Caretakers House can be booked via the department of Conservation website. There are two bunkrooms with 12 beds available.

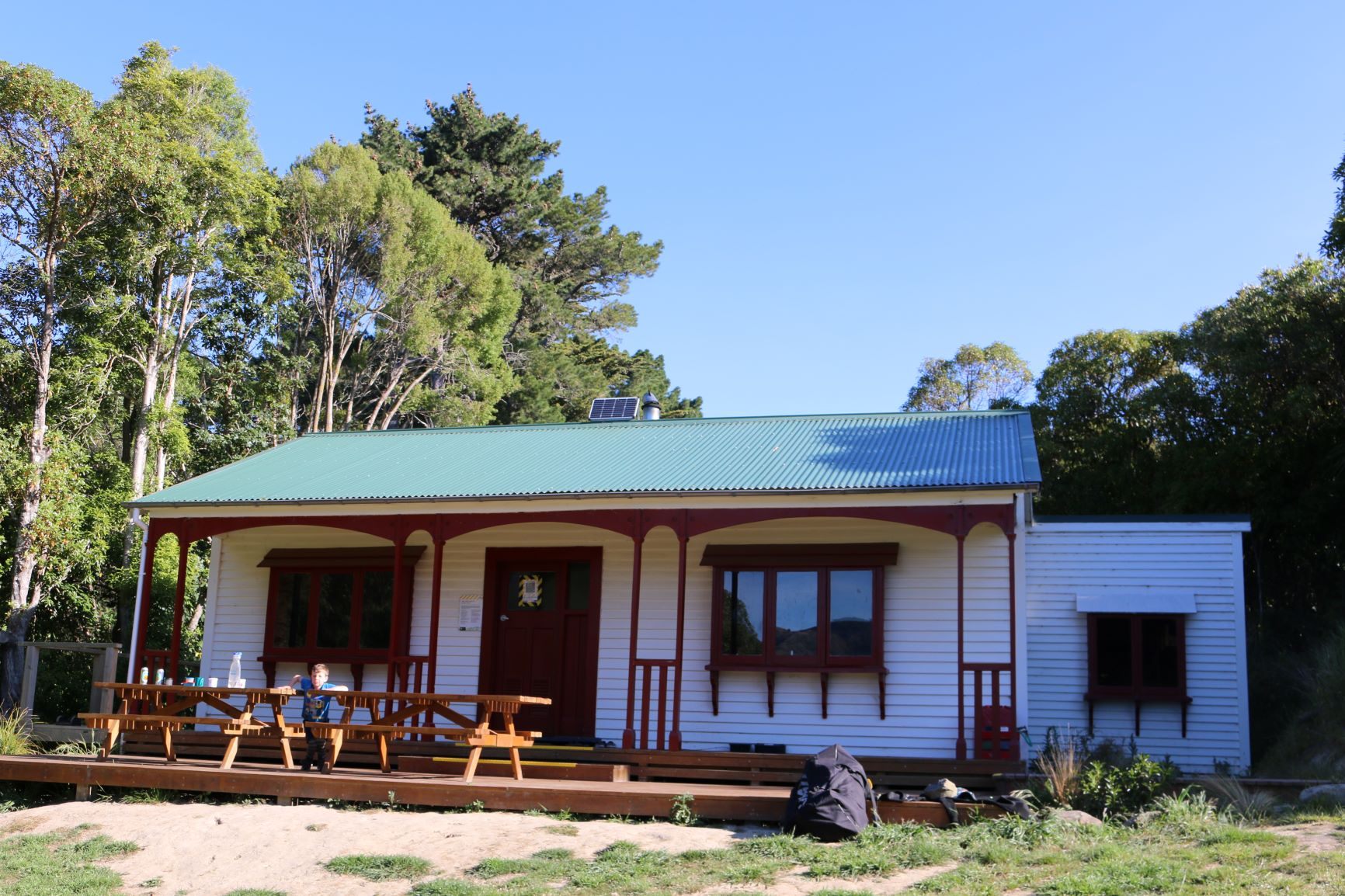
The Caretakers Hut, Ōtamahua / Quail Island

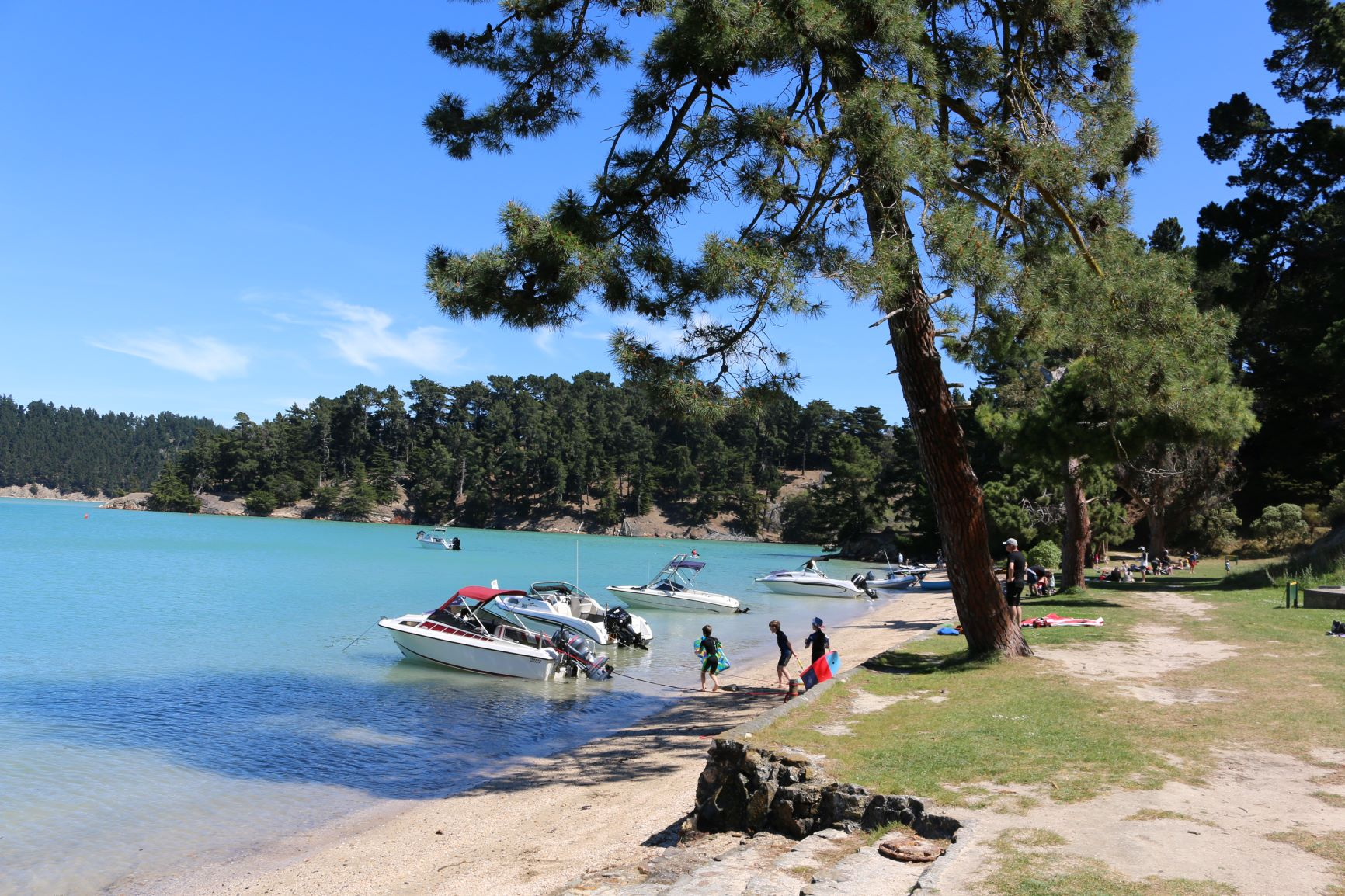
Swimmers Beach, Ōtamahua / Quail Island

== See also ==
- List of islands of New Zealand
- List of islands
- Desert island
