= Lyttelton Harbour =

Inlet on Banks Peninsula, New Zealand

Lyttelton Harbour / Whakaraupō
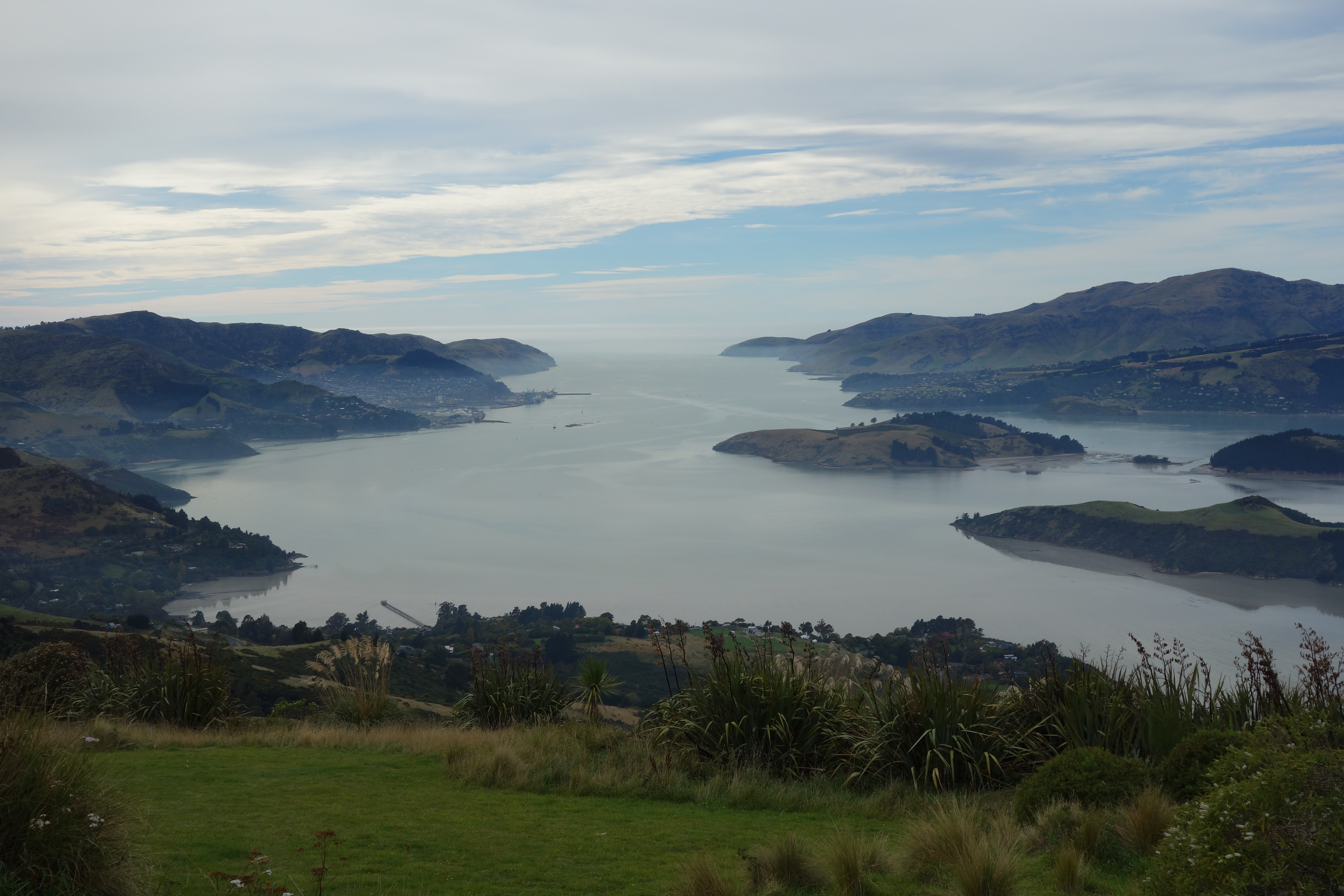
- Lyttelton Harbour / Whakaraupō as viewed from near the Sign of the Bellbird

- Location of Lyttelton Harbour / Whakaraupō in New Zealand
- Location: Banks Peninsula, South Island, New Zealand
- Coordinates: 43.615°S 172.730°E
- River sources: Te Rapu, Waiake Stream, Te Wharau Stream, Purau Stream
- Ocean/sea sources: Pacific Ocean
- Basin countries: New Zealand
- Max. length: 15 km (9.32 mi)
- Max. width: 5.5 km (3.42 mi)
- Islands: Otamahua / Quail Island, Aua / King Billy Island, Kamautaurua Island, Ripapa Island
- Sections/sub-basins: Otokitoki / Gollans Bay, Motukauatirahi / Cass Bay, Governors Bay, Head of the Bay, Te Wharau / Charteris Bay, Kaioruru / Church Bay, Te Waipapa / Diamond Harbour, Purau Bay, Te Pohue / Camp Bay, Waitata / Little Port Cooper
- Settlements: Lyttelton, Cass Bay, Te Rāpaki-o-Te Rakiwhakaputa, Governors Bay, Ōhinetahi, Charteris Bay, Diamond Harbour, Purau

Location and extent of Lyttelton Harbour / Whakaraupō in relation to Christchurch

Lyttelton Harbour / Whakaraupō is a major inlet on the northwest side of Banks Peninsula, on the coast of Canterbury, New Zealand; the other major inlet is Akaroa Harbour, which enters from the southern side of the peninsula. Lyttelton Harbour / Whakaraupō enters from the northern coast of the peninsula, heading in a predominantly westerly direction for approximately 15 km (9.3 mi) from its mouth to the aptly-named Head of the Bay near Teddington. The harbour sits in an eroded caldera of the ancient Banks Peninsula Volcano, the steep sides of which form the Port Hills on its northern shore.

The harbour's main population centre is Lyttelton, which serves the main port to the nearby city of Christchurch, linked with Christchurch by the single-track Lyttelton rail tunnel (opened 1867), a two lane road tunnel (opened 1964) and two roads over the Port Hills. Diamond Harbour lies to the south and the Māori village of Te Rāpaki-o-Te Rakiwhakaputa to the west. At the head of the harbour is the settlement of Governors Bay. The reserve of Otamahua / Quail Island is near the harbour head and Ripapa Island is just off its south shore at the entrance to Purau Bay.

The harbour provides access to a busy commercial port at Lyttelton which today includes a petroleum storage facility and a modern container and cargo terminal.

Hector's dolphins, a species endemic to New Zealand, and New Zealand fur seals are found in the harbour.

== Name ==
Lyttelton Harbour / Whakaraupō is one of many places in New Zealand to have a dual place name, consisting of names derived from both European and Māori names for the area. The harbour was one of approximately 90 places to be given a dual name as part of a landmark Treaty of Waitangi settlement with the Ngāi Tahu iwi in 1998. Whakaraupō translates as Bay/harbour of raupō in the South Island dialect of Māori. This name came from a swamp of raupō reed that grew prolifically in the vicinity of Ōhinetahi, or Governor's Bay, at the head of the harbour. Earlier sources give the Māori name as Whangaraupo, which has identical meaning to Whakaraupō, but uses the wider Māori spelling (whanga) of the word for harbour. The French spelling of Whakaraupo was Tapalabo. This was the name used in a chart published in 1840 from the surveys of 1838 by M.M Fournier and d'Ubraye on the Heroine captained by J-B Cecille. Captain Stokes of HMS Acheron, who led a survey of the harbour and surrounding lands in 1849, preferred to use the name Wakaraupo Bay to the then current English name of Port Cooper. However, Stokes' preferred name was not used when the harbour was officially renamed Port Victoria upon it becoming a Port of Entry in August 1849. The New Zealand Pilot of 1875, which is based on Stokes' survey, gives the Māori place name as Tewhaka, translating simply as 'the harbour'.

The harbour was given many different names during the early days of European settlement, the first of which was Cook's Harbour after early exploration by James Cook. This same expedition named Akaroa Harbour as Banks's Harbour after Joseph Banks. The first widespread name for the harbour was Port Cooper, after Daniel Cooper. This name was in common usage by the mid-1840s and was used as a brand name for farm produce from Banks Peninsula and the Dean's farm on the Canterbury Plains. The name Port Cooper was officially changed to Port Victoria (after Queen Victoria) in 1849, when the harbour became a Port of Entry. Both the 1849 Admiralty chart of the harbour and 1875 sailing instructions in the New Zealand Pilot refer to the harbour as Port Lyttelton or Victoria, with the latter source noting Port Cooper as a former name. Despite the name change and the use of Port Victoria on maps from the Canterbury Association, Port Cooper continued to see use as a name for some time. Charlotte Godley still refers to Port Cooper in her 1850 letters, while an 1867 immigrant also used the name when publishing his memoirs in 1928.

In 1858, the harbour's name changed again, this time to Lyttelton Harbour. This coincided with the naming of the town of Lyttelton on the harbour's north shore in honour of George William Lyttelton and the Lyttelton family. Exactly when the harbour came to be known as Lyttelton Harbour is unclear, as the name appears to have been in use for almost a decade prior to the name change. The name appears in an 1849 admiralty chart, while in 1853 John Robert Godley is reported using this name in a speech to the Canterbury Association. In the early 1860s, The Canterbury Provincial Council established a Lyttelton Harbour Commission, and in 1877 the Lyttelton Harbour Board came into existence, after the Provinces were abolished. This name was used until the adoption of the dual name in 1998.

== History ==
Whakaraupō and the surrounding hills have a long history of Māori activity. The islands of Aua and Ōtamahua (now with the dual names of Aua / King Billy Island and Ōtamahua / Quail Island respectively) were important sources of resources for local Māori, despite being uninhabited. Ngāi Tahu and Ngāti Mamoe used the islands as a source of shellfish, birds eggs and flax, as well as stone for use in tools. Sandstone from Aua was used to help work other stones used by Māori, such as pounamu. The significance of Ōtamahua in this regard is recognised in its Māori name, which translates as the gathering place of eggs. The nearby Ripapa Island has evidence of more permanent habitation, and was the location of a prominent defensive Pā built by the Ngāi Tahu chief Taununu. The pā was attacked during the 1820s by another group of Ngāi Tahu consisting of various hapū from across the South Island as part of the Kai huanga feud. Despite being razed by the attacking forces, the pā was rebuilt and continued to be inhabited by Ngāi Tahu after this period until it was attacked by Te Rauparaha during his invasion of Canterbury. The pā remained uninhabited from this point, until it was removed when Fort Jervois was built on the island in 1885–95. Rīpapa was used in World War I to intern German nationals as enemy aliens, the most notable being Count Felix von Luckner.

Upon the initial settlement of Canterbury, the harbour became a centre of activity for the early European settlers owing to its easier access when compared to the swamplands in present-day Christchurch. Lyttelton's population grew quickly, with the surrounding land and Quail Island being initially converted into farmland. As immigration grew, Quail Island was offered as a quarantine station to provide facilities for inbound ships with illness on board. Facilities were completed and operational on the island by 1875, and continued to be used for quarantine of inbound humans and livestock until 1929. The island was also used for containing cases during the 1918 Spanish flu pandemic and later as a leper colony in 1918–25. Otamahua / Quail Island is now a nature reserve.

The growing population of Lyttelton and the harbour's position as the arrival port for many new settlers facilitated the development of new links to the wider island. The first of these links was the Bridle Path, completed in 1850 to coincide with the arrival of Canterbury Association ships. This was joined in 1858 by the completion of a road to Sumner over Evans Pass, and in 1867 by the opening of the Lyttelton Rail Tunnel.

The road tunnel between Lyttelton and Christchurch opened in 1964, after having been discussed for more than 100 years. The tunnel cost £2.7 million to build and was said to be among the most modern in the world. At 1944m long, it was then New Zealand's longest road tunnel.

== Lyttelton port ==
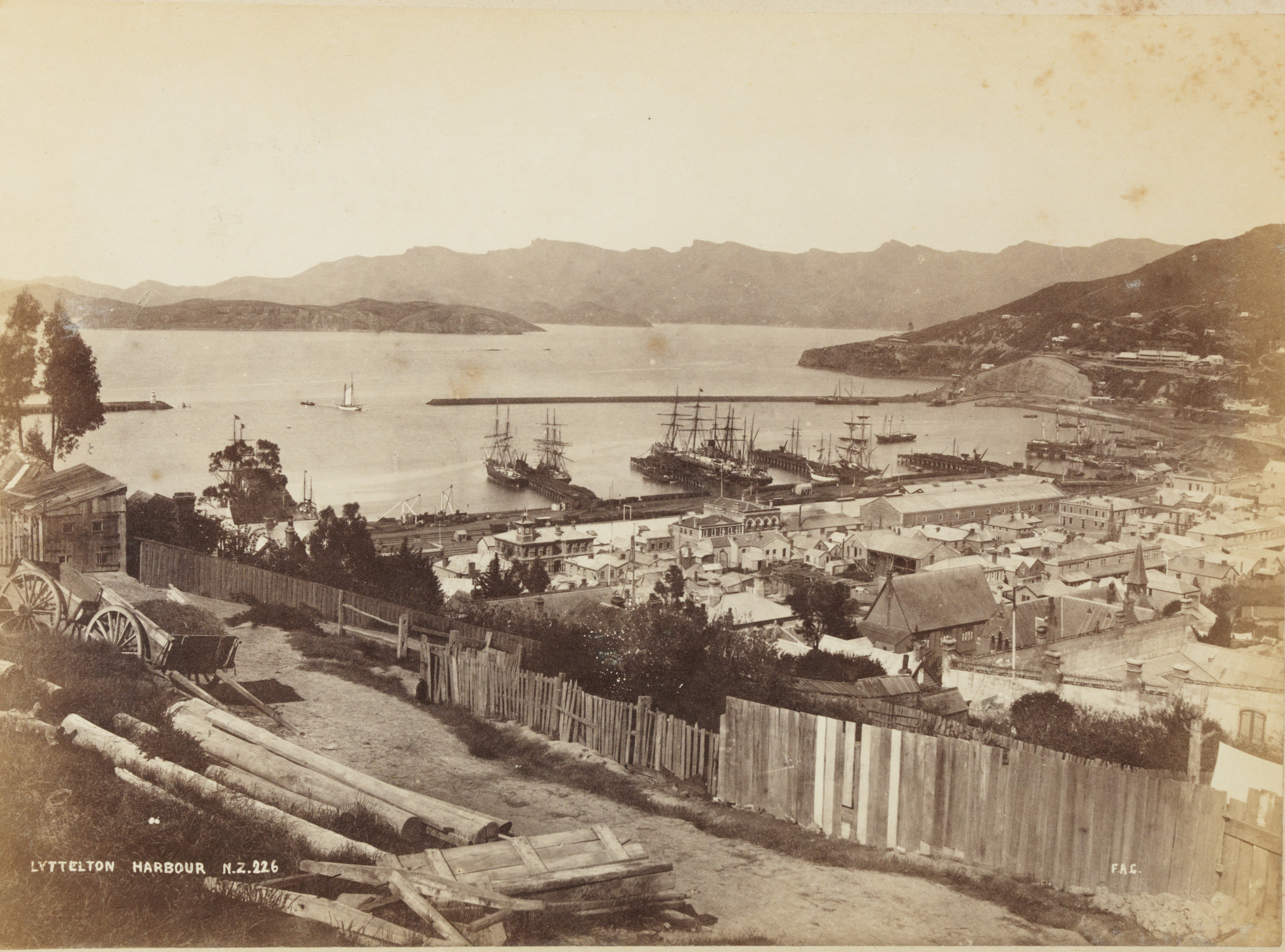
Lyttelton Harbour, New Zealand, c. 1895

In 1877 the Lyttelton Harbour Board (now Lyttelton Port Company) started building an inner harbour, and in 1895 the Union Steamship Company of New Zealand started a steamship service on the 200 nmi (370 km) route to Wellington with the steamer Penguin. From 1907 it was worked with turbine steamships and from 1933 it was named the "Steamer Express".

In 1962 New Zealand Railways started the Interislander ferry service on the 55 nmi (102 km) route between Picton and Wellington. This competing service not only offered a shorter crossing but also used diesel ships that had lower running costs than the Union Company's turbine steamers. The wreck of the Steamer Express TEV Wahine in 1968 was a setback for the Lyttelton service but the Union Company introduced a new ship, TEV Rangatira, in 1972. She lost money, survived on a Ministry of Transport subsidy from 1974 and was withdrawn in 1976, leaving the Interislander's Picton route to continue the ferry link between the two islands.

In the 1920s, large reclamations were carried out for petroleum storage tanks, and the Cashin Quay container berth was built in 1965. Between 1958 and 1967, the port was so busy and prosperous that Kaiapoi, on the coast north of Christchurch, briefly reopened its closed port facilities for a decade, to allow smaller ships to bypass the congested Lyttelton wharves.

In the 1970s the port was chosen as one of the main ports in the South Island to be dredged and upgraded for containerisation, with the container facility opening in 1977, the centenary of the initial opening.

In 1988, the Port Companies Act created the Lyttelton Port Company, which took over the Port’s commercial role including the land, assets and facilities.

Substantial quantities of South Island coal have been shipped from this port for the past 100 years. The port facilities have provided for LP gas and petrol for the past 50 years. Based on quantities of materials shipped in or out, it is the primary port for energy shipments in the South Island.

A regular port of call for cruise ships, the port opened a new purpose built pier in November 2020, able to handle the largest modern ships.

== Geography ==
Lyttelton Harbour / Whakaraupō was formed by erosion of the Banks Peninsula Volcano, which was active during the late Miocene from eruptive centres in both Lyttelton and Akaroa harbours. As the volcano eroded, the calderas formed by the eruptions were flooded, forming both of the main harbours on the Peninsula. The harbour shares a common entrance with adjacent Port Levy / Koukourarata about 2 nmi (4 km) wide, between Awaroa / Godley Head and Baleine Point, with Te Piaka / Adderley Head set back slightly. The entrance lies 2.5 nmi (4.6 km) from Sumner beach at the south east end of the sandy beaches of Pegasus Bay. From the entrance the harbour runs in West-South-West direction for 7 nmi (13 km) with the port of Lyttelton being 4 nmi (7 km) up the harbour from the heads, lies on the northern shore. Between the heads the harbour is 8 fathoms (15 m) deep which gradually reduces to 3.5 fathoms (6 m) in the vicinity of Lyttelton port. The bottom of mostly soft mud and the only significant navigation hazard between the heads and the port is Parson Rock, a detached submerged rock pinnacle, which is marked, on the south side of the harbour about 200 metres north of Ripapa Island. The shipping channel has been dredged so the port can cope with larger container ships.

The prevailing winds in Lyttelton Harbour are from the north-east and south-west. South-west gales can be very violent and have been known to drive ships at anchor ashore from as early as 1851. In October 2000, 32 boats were sunk and a marina destroyed in one southerly storm with sustained winds of 130 km/h (70 kn). In strong northerly winds a heavy swell rolls up the harbour.

=== Bays and headlands ===
Working around the harbour from Awaroa / Godley Head to Te Piaka / Adderley Head one encounters:

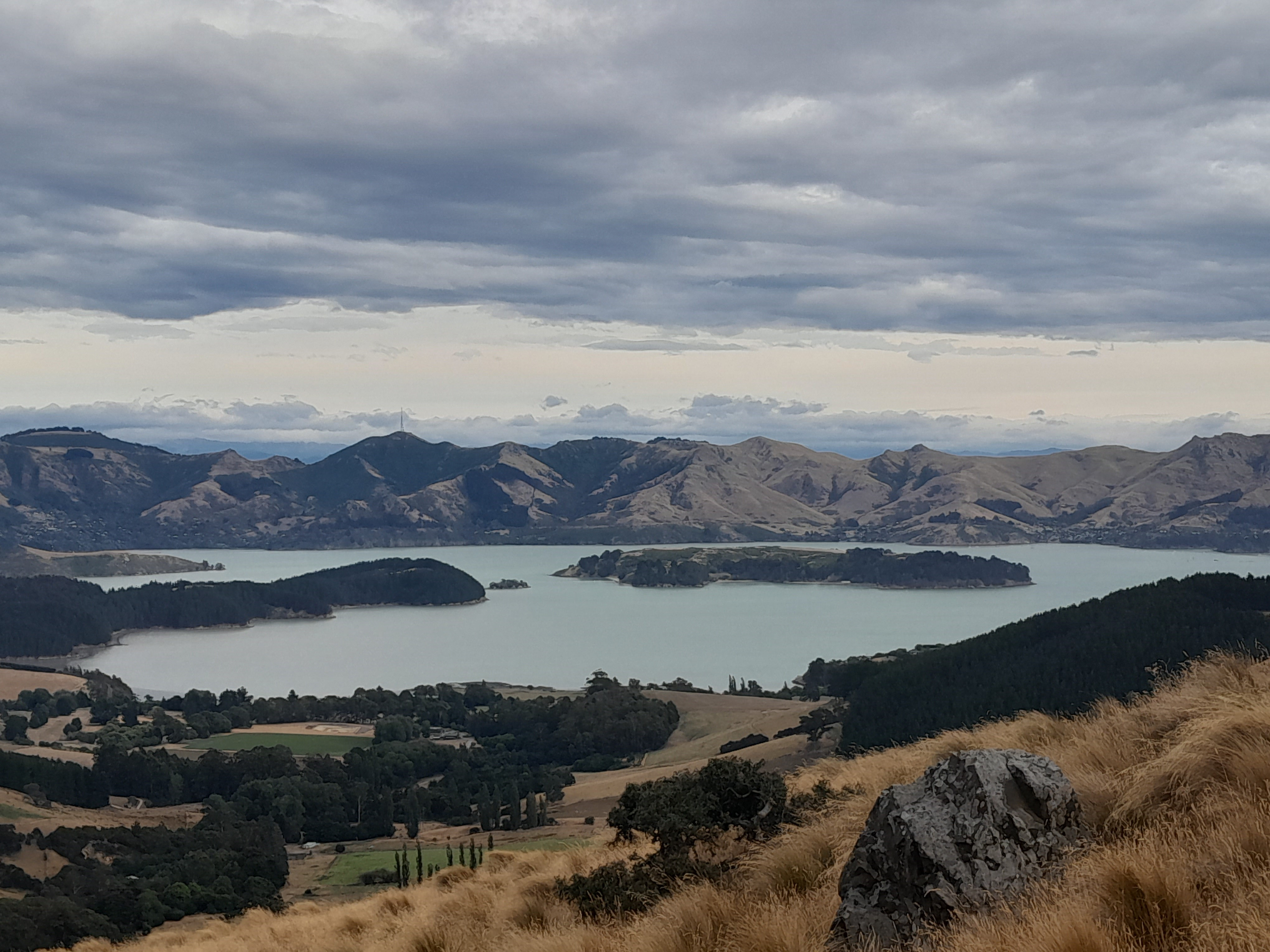
A view of Lyttelton Harbour, taken from Orton Bradley park

Mechanics Bay
Mechanics Bay is where supplies for the Godley Head lighthouse were landed.
Breeze Bay
Livingstone Bay
Otokitoki / Gollans Bay
This bay is below Evans Pass. Gollan was one of the surveyors of the harbour.
Battery Point
Polhill's Bay
Which has been completely reclaimed for Cashin Quay.
Sticking Point
This is where construction of the Sumner Road stopped when it encountered difficult rock.
Officers Point
Erskine Bay
The Port of Lyttelton occupies this bay.
Tapoa / Erskine Point
Magazine Bay
Motukauatiiti / Corsair Bay
A popular bay for swimming at.
Motukauatirahi / Cass Bay
Thomas Cass was one of the surveyors of the harbour.
Rāpaki Bay
Ōhinetahi / Governors Bay
A small town located on Banks Peninsula near the head of Lyttelton Harbour
Kaitangata / Mansons Peninsula
Head of the Bay
Moepuku Point
Te Wharau / Charteris Bay
Hays Bay
Kaioruru / Church Bay
Pauaohinekotau Head
Te Waipapa / Diamond Harbour
Stoddard Point
Purau Bay
Inainatua / Pile Bay
Deep Gully Bay
Te Pohue / Camp Bay
Waitata / Little Port Cooper
Formerly a whaling station and later a pilot station.

=== Islands ===
Aua / King Billy Island
Aua / King Billy Island is a small island between Otamahua / Quail Island and the adjacent headland of Moepuku Point. In the past it has also been called Little Quail Island.
Ōtamahua / Quail Island
The Māori name Ōtamahua means eggs of the sea fowl. It was named Quail Island after an 1842 incident when Captain William Mein Smith flushed some native quail while out walking here to complete a sketch he was drawing of the island. Both the English and Māori names were given equal status in 2003 with the dual name of Ōtamahua / Quail Island.
Kamautaurua Island
Kamautaurua Island was previously known as Kamautaurua or Shag Reef. In December 1862, the cutter Dolphin capsized and wrecked on the reef into an unfavourable wind and tide when returning from further up the harbour with a load of lime.
Ripapa Island
Also known as Ripa Island. About 200 m (219 yd) north of the island lies Parson Rock, a submerged rock pinnacle that is covered by about 2.4 m (8 ft) of water at low tide. The rock has been known by this name since the 1800s.

== Marine mammal sanctuary ==
The endangered Hector's dolphin lives in the sea around Banks Peninsula, and is occasionally seen in Lyttelton Harbour.

The Banks Peninsula Marine Mammal Sanctuary, New Zealand’s first for marine mammals, was created in 1988, to protect Hector’s dolphin from bycatch in set nets. It was expanded in 2020, with restrictions introduced on seismic surveying and seabed mining.stretches from the Jed River south to the Waitaki River, and extends 20 nautical miles out to sea, a total area of about 14,310 km^{2}.

In March 2024, round 9 of the 2023–24 SailGP championship was held in Lyttelton Harbour. The first race day was cancelled due to dolphins being seen on the race course, leading SailGP co-founder Russell Coutts to criticise the "extreme" and "restrictive" protocols. The Department of Conservation responded that SailGP held the event in the full knowledge that protecting the dolphins from the impact of boats would be paramount. Coutts later announced that SailGP would not return to Lyttelton.

The Lyttelton Port Company says New Zealand fur seals are occasionally found in Lyttelton Harbour when foraging. Other species visiting the harbour include right whales, humpback whales, dusky dolphins and killer whales.

== In popular culture ==
Paul Theroux described Lyttelton Harbour as "long and lovely, a safe anchorage" in The Happy Isles of Oceania.

== Gallery ==
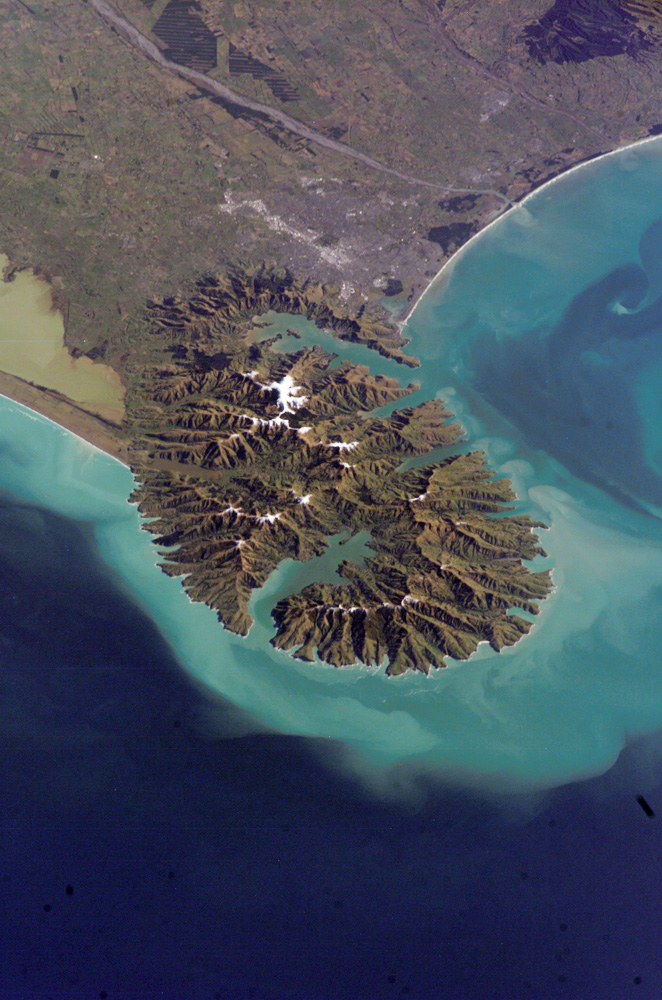
Lyttelton Harbour (right / northwest) and Akaroa Harbour (left / south) in the Banks Peninsula Volcano, viewed in 2006 from the International Space Station

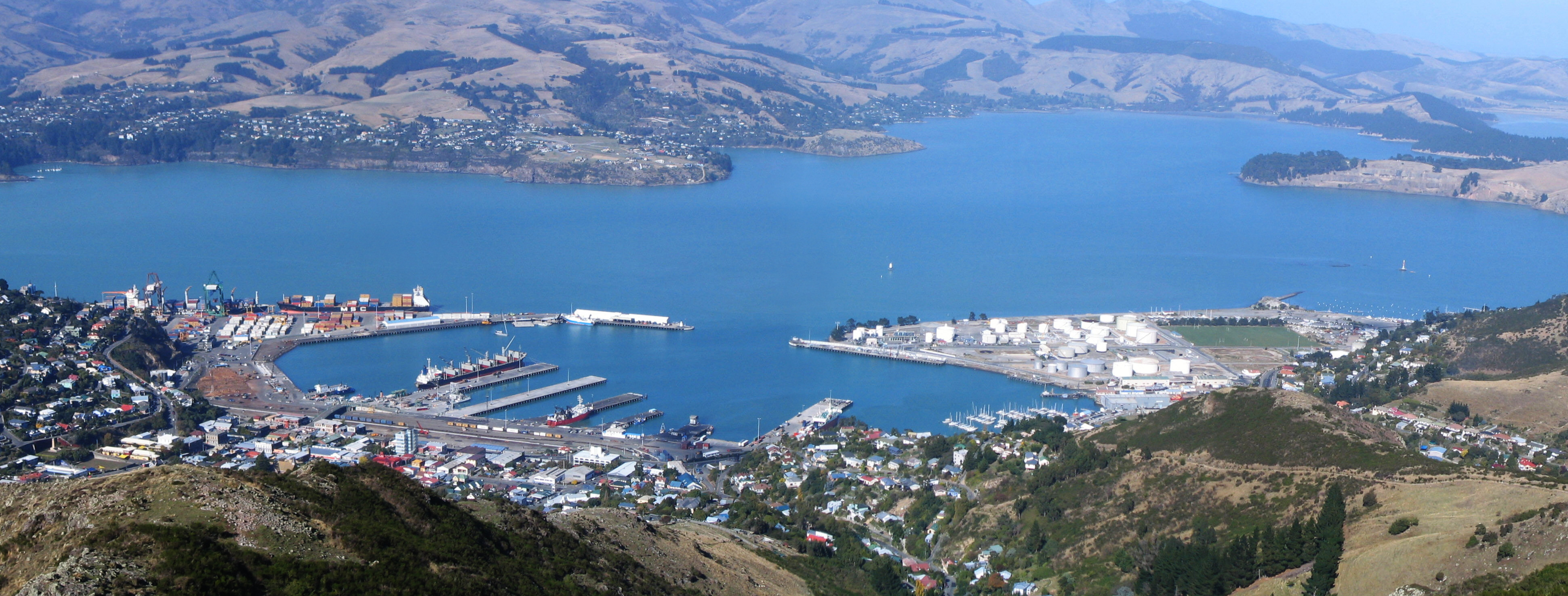
Lyttelton Harbour as seen from Mount Cavendish (2005)
