= Samuel Brees =

British artist, surveyor, and engineer

Samuel Charles Brees (c. 1810 – 5 May 1865) was a British artist, surveyor and engineer.

He served an apprenticeship with a London architect then trained as a civil engineer in Bristol under G.W.Buck and Robert Stephenson. He designed the greater part of the London to Birmingham line.

Between 1837 and 1847 he published a four volume series on Railway Practice, which is considered one of the foremost sources of contemporary information on civil engineering related to early railways and rolling stock, and was illustrated with more than 250 folding and double paged plates.

He was employed by the New Zealand Company as principal surveyor and engineer from 1842 to 1845. He succeeded William Mein Smith in this role. Brees died of heart disease at sea on the La Hogue off Blackwall, London.
