= William Mein Smith =

New Zealand politician

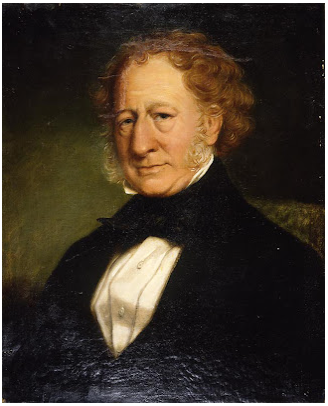
Portrait of William Mein Smith

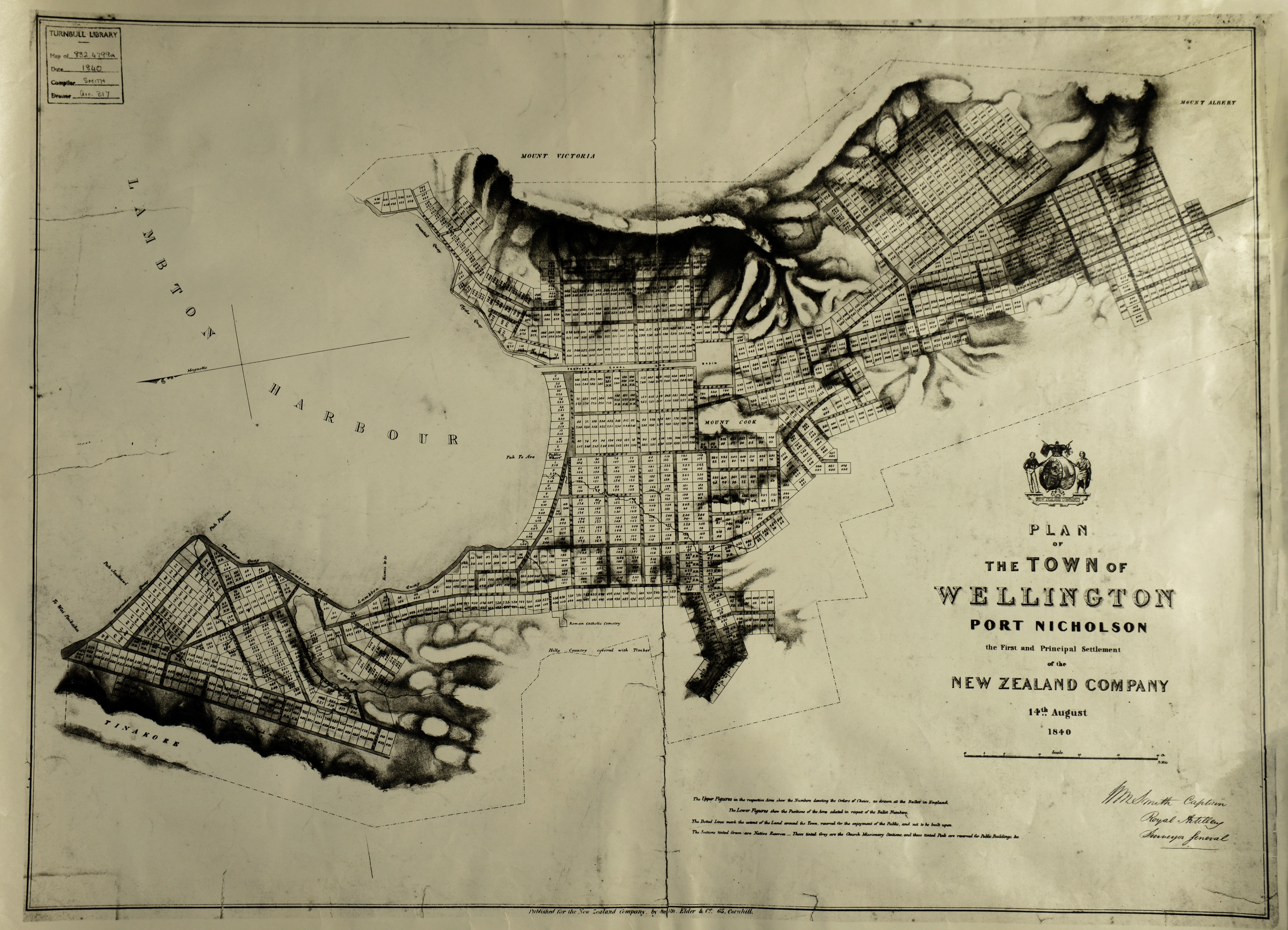
Original Wellington Plan created by William Mein Smith 1840

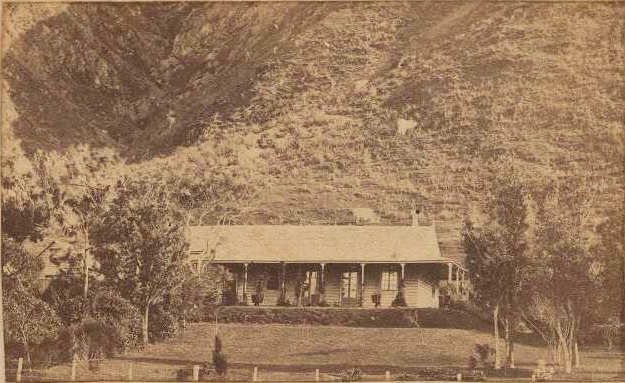
Residence of William Mein Smith while he lived in Wellington at 125 Grant Road

William Mein Smith (also known as Kapene Mete; 1798 – 3 January 1869) was a key figure in the settlement of Wellington, New Zealand. As the Surveyor General for Edward Wakefield's New Zealand Company at Port Nicholson from 1840 to 1843, he and his team surveyed the town of Wellington, after finding the land on the Petone foreshore unsuitable, laying out the town belt and other features and making provision for the much debated "tenth" share of the land for local Māori.

== Early life ==
Born in 1798 in Cape Town, South Africa, he was raised in Devon and the Scottish Borders, serving in the Royal Artillery from 1814 in Ireland and then Canada. There he met his wife, Louisa Bargrave Wallace, who was born in Canada in 1802 as the first child of then First Lieutenant, later General, Peter Margetson Wallace of the Royal Artillery and his partner, later wife, Louisa Turmaine. They married at Kingston, Ontario in 1828 and his next posting was to Gibraltar, including being part of a diplomatic visit to Marrakesh in 1829–30, followed by appointment to the Royal Military Academy, Woolwich where he taught as Master of Line Drawing, before being approached to assist Wakefield's New Zealand Company in 1839. He and his team of surveyors sailed to New Zealand on the New Zealand Company barque Cuba, arriving on 3 January 1840 in the harbour of Port Nicholson. His wife and older children arrived two months later.

Town Acre 646, between Tinakori & Grant Roads, later 125 Grant Road, was the residence of William Mein Smith while he lived in Wellington.

== Professional life ==
He was instrumental in the Wellington colony's early administration, the setting out of the town (including reservation of one tenth for Māori owners), and country acres, and later oversaw work in the Manawatū and Whanganui. He was gazetted as a magistrate. He also served on the short-lived (and controversial) Wellington Town Council established by the Company. His name survives today however only indirectly, in Mein Street, Wellington. His other contributions included helping to form the first library, designing the first light at the entrance to the harbour, exploring the route to Porirua and the Kāpiti Coast, and founding the Horticultural Society.

Though getting on the wrong side of Colonel Wakefield, the Company's Principal Agent, and being dismissed as Surveyor General from early 1842, when he was replaced without warning by Samuel Charles Brees, he was commissioned to sail down the East Coast of the South Island in September 1842 was directed to map the harbours on the South Island's east coast to help locate another site for settlement by the New Zealand Company. He was thus an early visitor to what is now Christchurch, Akaroa, Port Chalmers and Bluff. He still had the opportunity to visit and name Quail Island in Lyttelton Harbour, after crossing the peninsula on foot, visiting whalers and Māori alike.

Later he surveyed a number of other parts of the lower North Island, including some townships in Wairarapa (Featherston and Masterton in particular), the coastline as far north as Castlepoint, and the Taratahi plain. He also spent time in the 1850s seeking a better route through the mountains to Wellington.

He left his first home under what is now Tinakori Hill, Wellington, driving some of the first cattle round the rocky coastline. He was involved in operating a farming venture near Wellington at Terawhiti until 1846. They were among the first half dozen settlers in the valley. There he and Louisa raised their five children. He also carried on surveying and was a local magistrate and politician. He also had close dealings with local Māori, and his image is preserved in one of 13 pou whakairo (carved perimeter posts) that guard the Papawai marae, near Greytown, due to his close association with chief Hamuera Tamahau Mahupuku - so close that the chief adopted the child of one of Captain Mein Smith's descendants.

== Political career ==
Smith was a member of the General Legislative Council from 1851 until it was replaced by the later Legislative Council on 28 September 1853. He then represented the Wairarapa electorate on the Wellington Provincial Council from 1858 (when he defeated Charles Borlase) to 1865.

== Art ==
Smith produced water colours and sketches of early Wellington and Wairarapa, many of which are held by Wellington's Alexander Turnbull Library.

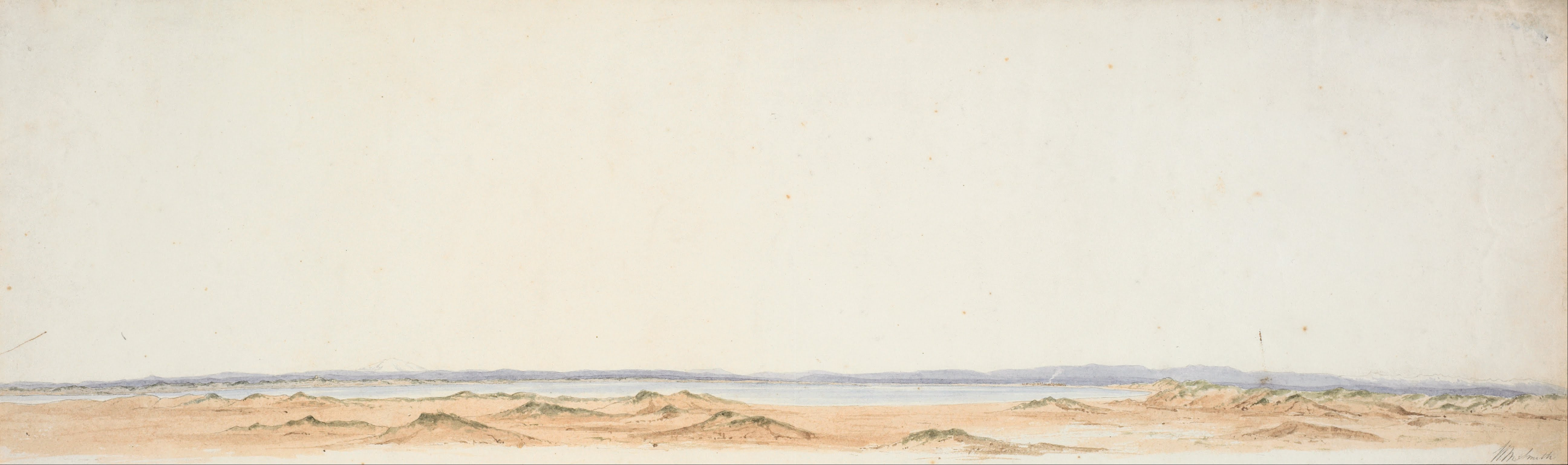
Sketch from the South Bank of the Rangitiki, 1841 by William Mein Smith

== Death ==
He died in Greytown in the Wairarapa in 1869 after a lengthy illness, at his and Revan's home "Brierly" at Woodside. Louisa had died there two years earlier.
