= Purau =

Settlement in Canterbury, New Zealand

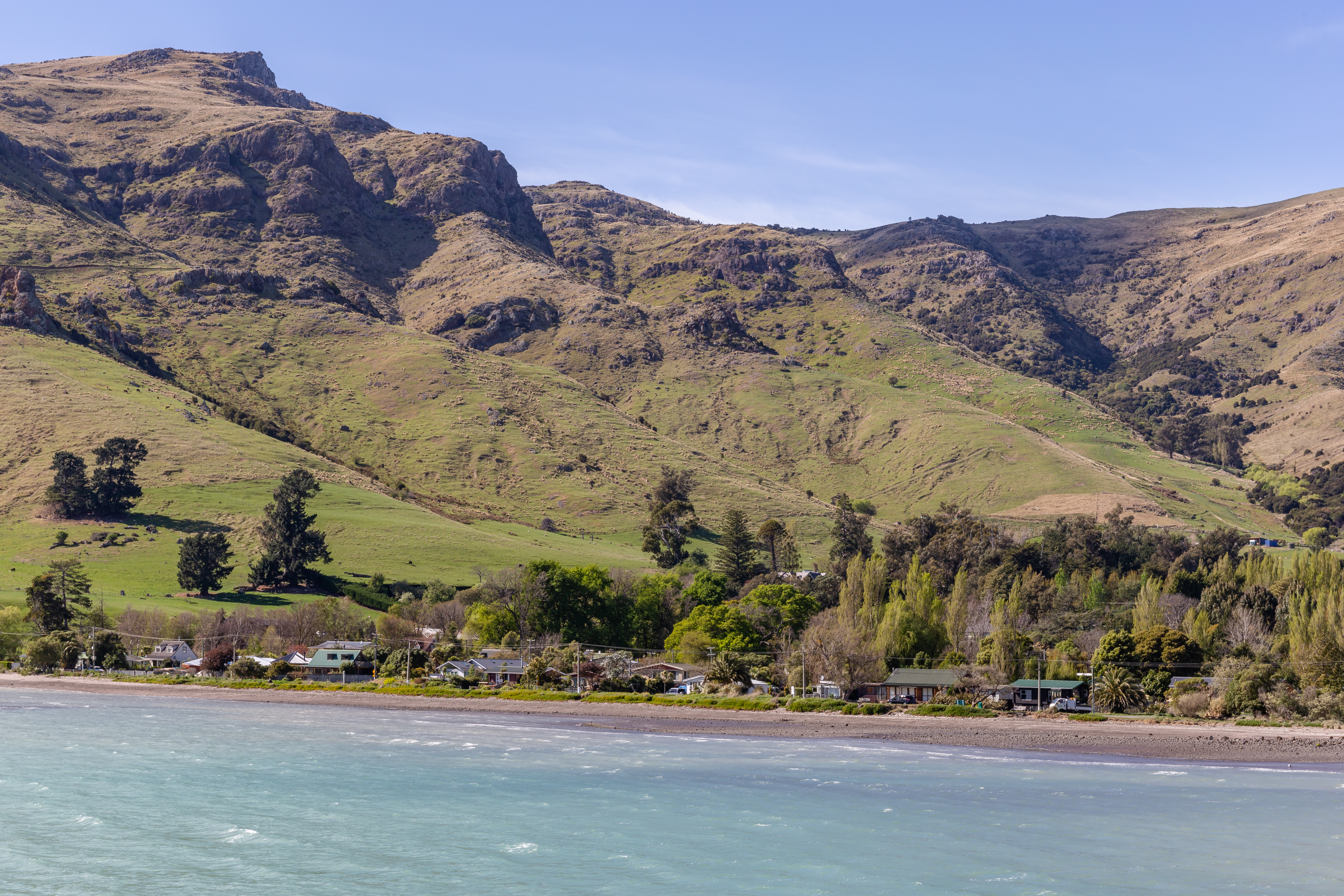
- Purau
- Interactive map of Purau
- Coordinates: 43°38′30.44″S 172°45′8.23″E
- Country: New Zealand
- Region: Canterbury Region
- District: Christchurch City
- Ward: Banks Peninsula
- Community: Te Pātaka o Rākaihautū Banks Peninsula
- Electorates: Banks Peninsula; Te Tai Tonga (Māori)

Government
  - Territorial Authority: Christchurch City Council
  - Regional council: Environment Canterbury
  - Mayor of Christchurch: Phil Mauger
  - Banks Peninsula MP: Vanessa Weenink
  - Te Tai Tonga MP: Tākuta Ferris

Area
  - Total: 0.21 km^{2} (0.081 sq mi)

Population (2023 census)
  - Total: 75
  - Density: 360/km^{2} (920/sq mi)

Purau is a small town in Canterbury, New Zealand, facing Lyttelton Harbour.

== Geography ==
Purau is located on Banks Peninsula, one of the southern bays forming Lyttelton Harbour.

== History ==
Purau has a long history of Māori settlement. Ngāti Māmoe lived here prior to Ngāi Tahu settling the bay. There are many Māori burial sites in the area.

The bay's first English name was "Acheron Bay", and this name persisted until the 1860s. The name derives from the British Admiralty survey ship HMSV Acheron, which was anchored at Purau in early 1849 while its captain John Stokes and surveyor W.J.W. Hamilton conducted the first survey off the New Zealand coastline since Cook's voyage, exploring the Peninsula and nearby Canterbury Plains.

European occupation started in 1843, when the Greenwood brothers started a farm here. They sold to the Rhodes brothers in 1847 (William Barnard and George, with the latter taking over management of the station). When Robert Heaton Rhodes, another of the Rhodes brothers, came to New Zealand in 1850, he took over Purau.

== Demographics ==
Purau covers 0.21 km^{2} (0.081 sq mi). It was part of the Eastern Bays-Banks Peninsula SA2 statistical area in 2018, and part of Diamond Harbour in 2023.

Historical population
Year	Pop.	±% p.a.
2006	63	—
2013	51	−2.97%
2018	69	+6.23%
2023	75	+1.68%

Purau had a population of 75 in the 2023 New Zealand census, an increase of 6 people (8.7%) since the 2018 census, and an increase of 24 people (47.1%) since the 2013 census. There were 39 males and 36 females in 33 dwellings. 4.0% of people identified as LGBTIQ+. The median age was 58.5 years (compared with 38.1 years nationally). There were 9 people (12.0%) aged under 15 years, 3 (4.0%) aged 15 to 29, 42 (56.0%) aged 30 to 64, and 21 (28.0%) aged 65 or older.

People could identify as more than one ethnicity. The results were 92.0% European (Pākehā), 24.0% Māori, and 8.0% Pasifika. English was spoken by 92.0%, Māori by 4.0%, and other languages by 4.0%. The percentage of people born overseas was 24.0, compared with 28.8% nationally.

Religious affiliations were 28.0% Christian, and 4.0% New Age. People who answered that they had no religion were 60.0%, and 8.0% of people did not answer the census question.

Of those at least 15 years old, 15 (22.7%) people had a bachelor's or higher degree, 30 (45.5%) had a post-high school certificate or diploma, and 15 (22.7%) people exclusively held high school qualifications. The median income was $41,200, compared with $41,500 nationally. 6 people (9.1%) earned over $100,000 compared to 12.1% nationally. The employment status of those at least 15 was 36 (54.5%) full-time and 6 (9.1%) part-time.

== Gallery ==
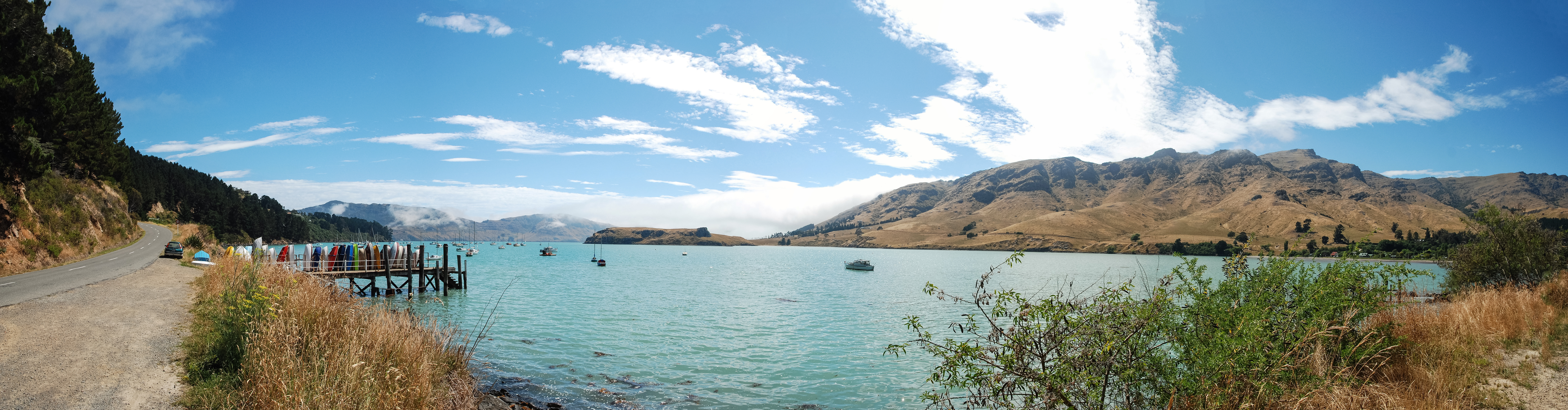
Panorama of Purau Bay

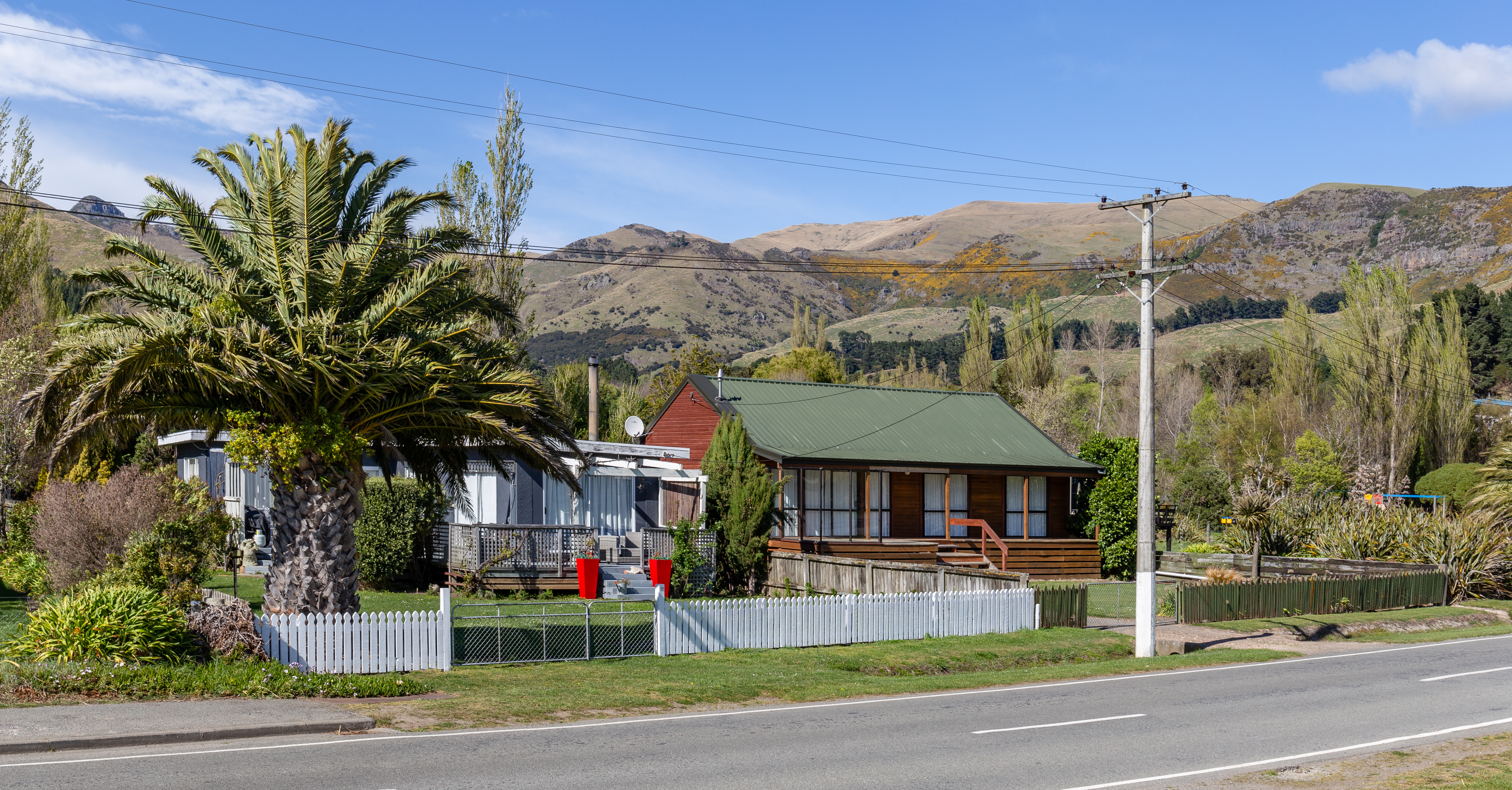
A house in Purau

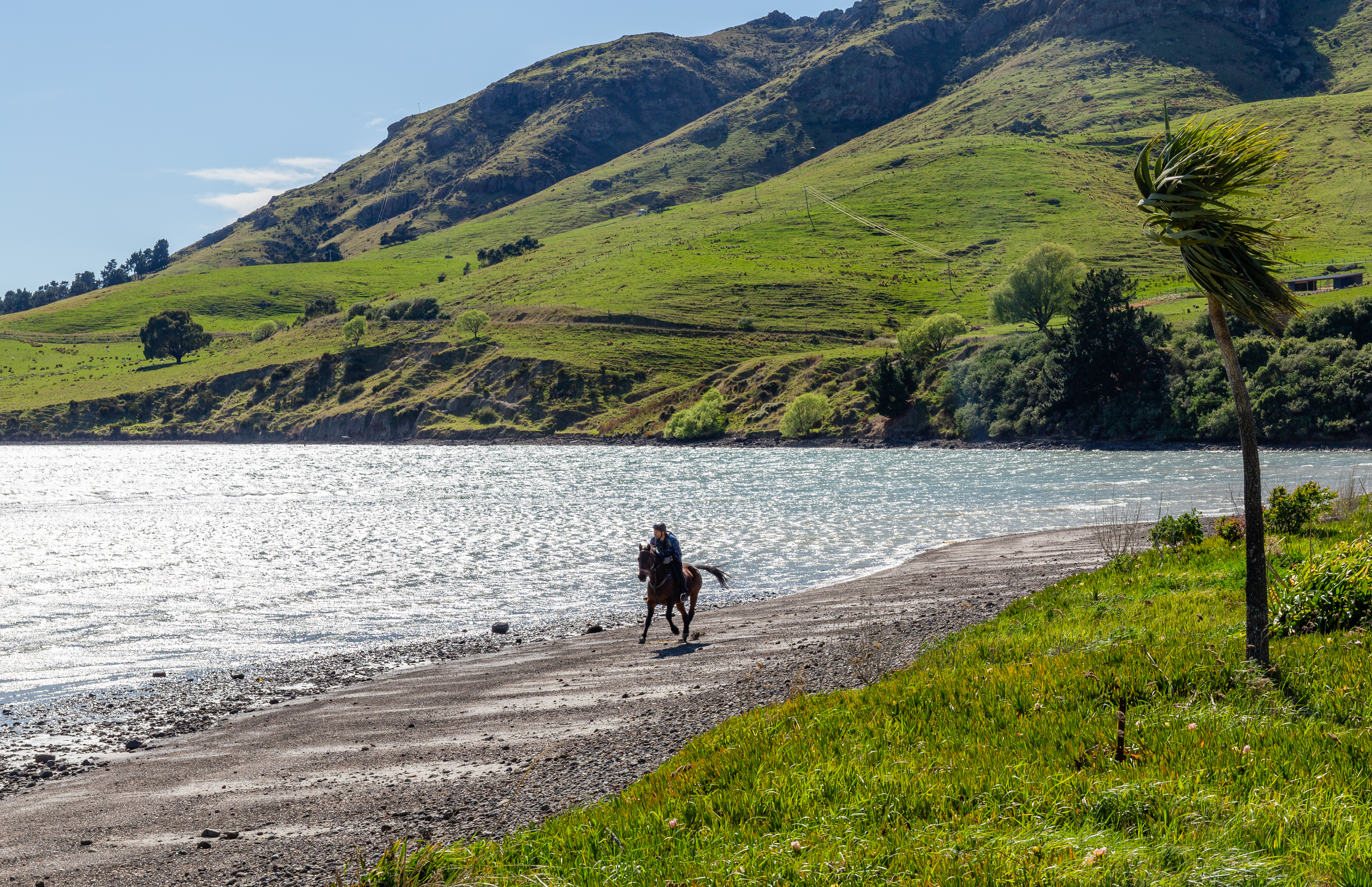
Beach

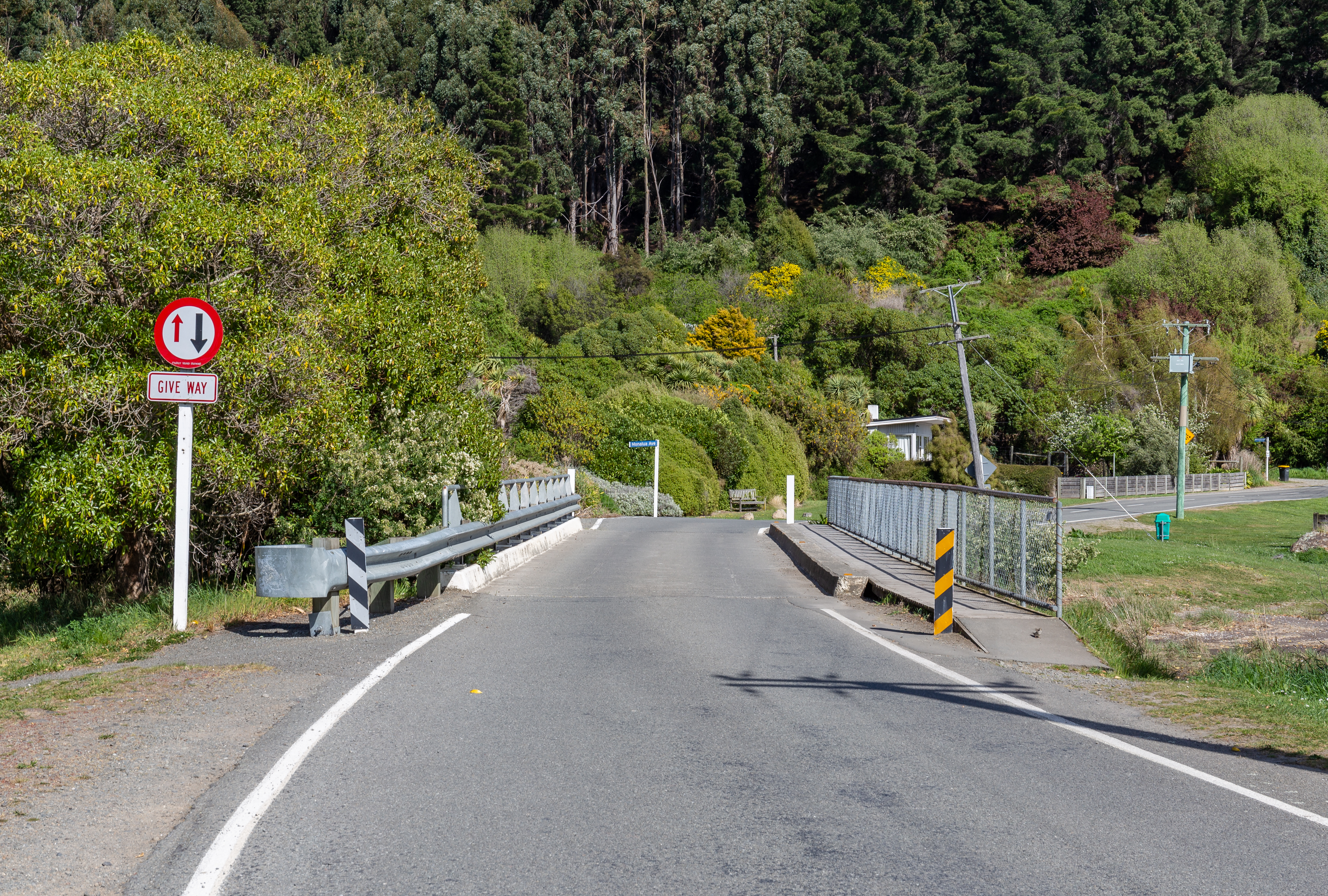
Bridge across Purau Stream
