= Charteris Bay =

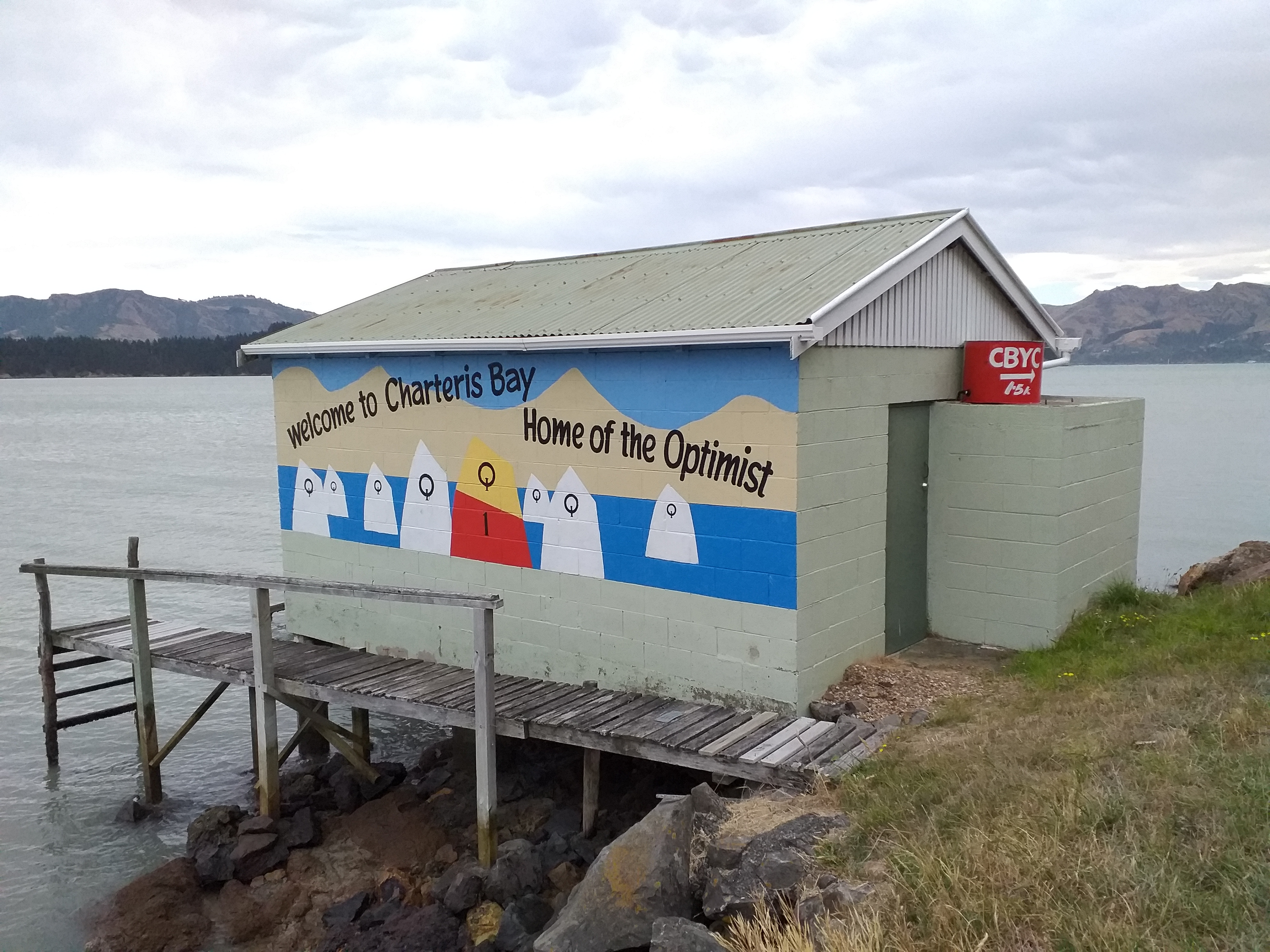
- The boat shed at Charteris Bay recording its association with the Optimist Dinghy
- Interactive map of Charteris Bay
- Coordinates: 43°38′40″S 172°41′55″E
- Country: New Zealand
- Region: Canterbury Region
- District: Christchurch City
- Ward: Banks Peninsula

Area
  - Total: 0.26 km^{2} (0.10 sq mi)

Population (2023 Census)
  - Total: 129
  - Density: 500/km^{2} (1,300/sq mi)

Charteris Bay is a small settlement on Banks Peninsula in New Zealand. The settlement is located on the south eastern side of Te Wharau / Charteris Bay, a large inlet of Lyttelton Harbour / Whakaraupō. The settlement sits between Diamond Harbour to the east and Teddington to the west.

The community is notable for Orton Bradley Park and as the location of a quarry which produced a decorative sandstone used in many early buildings of Christchurch.

The community is spread out along the main road from Teddington to Diamond Harbour. It has a golf course adjacent to Orton Bradley park and a popular sailing club, which advertises itself as "home of the Optimist" – a reference to the Optimist sailing dinghy first sailed in New Zealand from Charteris Bay.

At low tide some extensive mud flats support a wide range of wading birds including Royal spoonbills.

== Demographics ==
Charteris Bay settlement covers 0.26 km^{2} (0.10 sq mi). It is part of the Diamond Harbour statistical area.

Historical population
Year	Pop.	±% p.a.
2006	138	—
2013	129	−0.96%
2018	147	+2.65%
2023	129	−2.58%
The 2006 population is for a larger area of 1.52 km^{2}. Source:

The settlement had a population of 129 in the 2023 New Zealand census, a decrease of 18 people (−12.2%) since the 2018 census, and unchanged since the 2013 census. There were 66 males, 63 females, and 3 people of other genders in 66 dwellings. 4.7% of people identified as LGBTIQ+. The median age was 59.4 years (compared with 38.1 years nationally). There were 12 people (9.3%) aged under 15 years, 9 (7.0%) aged 15 to 29, 66 (51.2%) aged 30 to 64, and 45 (34.9%) aged 65 or older.

People could identify as more than one ethnicity. The results were 97.7% European (Pākehā), 9.3% Māori, 2.3% Pasifika, and 4.7% other, which includes people giving their ethnicity as "New Zealander". English was spoken by 97.7%, Māori by 2.3%, Samoan by 2.3%, and other languages by 11.6%. No language could be spoken by 2.3% (e.g. too young to talk). The percentage of people born overseas was 20.9, compared with 28.8% nationally.

Religious affiliations were 25.6% Christian, and 2.3% New Age. People who answered that they had no religion were 67.4%, and 2.3% of people did not answer the census question.

Of those at least 15 years old, 60 (51.3%) people had a bachelor's or higher degree, 45 (38.5%) had a post-high school certificate or diploma, and 9 (7.7%) people exclusively held high school qualifications. The median income was $45,000, compared with $41,500 nationally. 24 people (20.5%) earned over $100,000 compared to 12.1% nationally. The employment status of those at least 15 was 45 (38.5%) full-time and 21 (17.9%) part-time.
