= Cass Peak =

Hill in New Zealand

- Ōrongomai
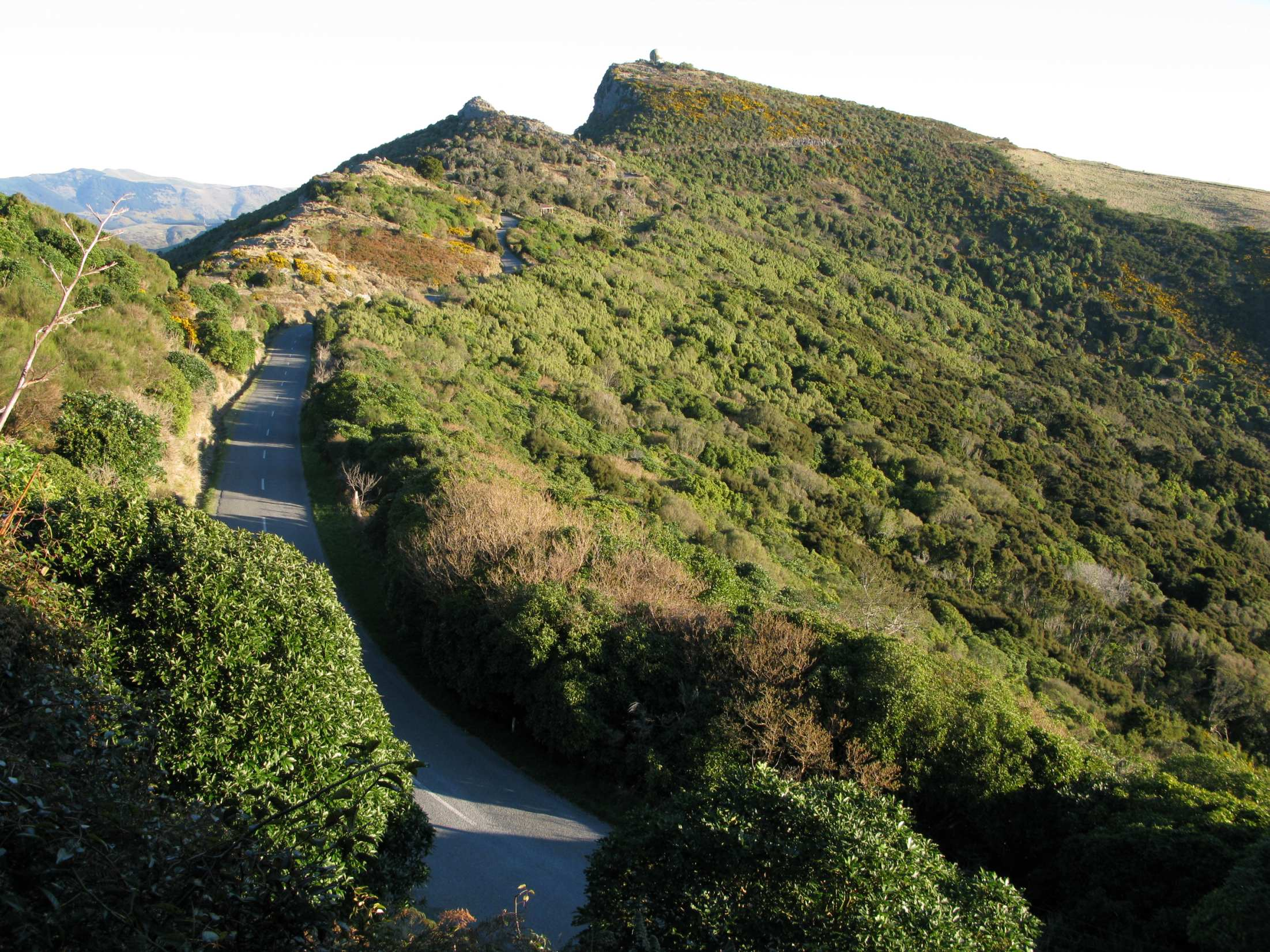
- Kennedys Bush Scenic Reserve and the Summit Road in the foreground, with Cass Peak in the background

Highest point
- Elevation: 545 m (1,788 ft)
- Coordinates: 43°38′09″S 172°37′26″E

Geography
- Location within Christchurch, New Zealand
- Location: Christchurch
- Parent range: Port Hills

Geology
- Mountain type: Basalt volcanic rock

Ōrongomai / Cass Peak is a hill in the western Port Hills in Christchurch, New Zealand. Its most notable feature is a radar dome that was built on the peak in the late 1980s, which is used for aircraft positioning services.

== Geography ==
Cass Peak is located in the Port Hills and is 545 metres (1,788 ft) high. Otamatua is the spur on the Christchurch side of the peak that divides the Hoon Hay and Kennedy's Bush valleys. At the bottom end of Otamatua is the Halswell Quarry. On the eastern side of Cass Peak is Lyttelton Harbour, with Allandale and Governors Bay the nearest settlements on the harbour side. The peak is accessible from the Summit Road by vehicle, and via the Crater Rim walkway. It is just south of Kennedy's Bush Scenic Reserve.

== Etymology ==
Cass Peak was named for Thomas Cass, the chief surveyor of Canterbury from 1851 until his retirement in 1867. The hill was earlier called Cass's Peak. The Māori name for the hill is Ō-Rongo-Mai, which translates as "where voices are heard". This refers to the time some 300 years ago when Ngāi Tahu kaumātua Te Rangi-whakaputa and his followers captured the area from the Kāti Māmoe. On top of the peak, the Ngāi Tahu heard the voices of a Kāti Māmoe hunting party. The latter were slaughtered on the peak.

In July 2020, the hill was officially assigned the dual name Ōrongomai / Cass Peak by the New Zealand Geographic Board.

== History ==
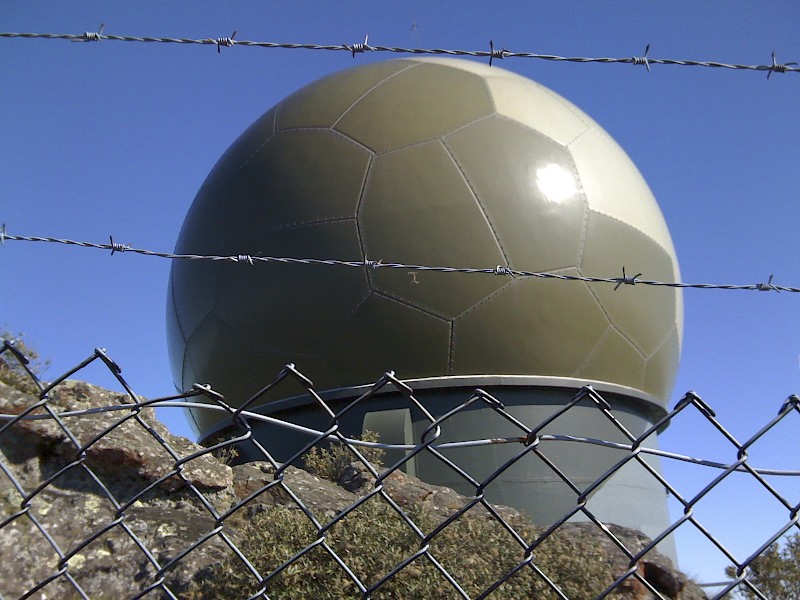
The radar dome on Cass Peak

The original Gothic architecture railway station in Christchurch's Moorhouse Avenue, opened in 1876, was built of red brick, with stone facings from Cass Peak as architectural elements. In 1948, an area of 7 acres (2.8 ha) was vested into Christchurch City Council as a reserve, and the area was named Cass Peak Scenic Reserve. The reserve is fenced to exclude livestock because it has high botanical value. The reserve's perimeter is about 1 kilometre (0.62 mi).

Harry Ell, famous for his preservation work in the Port Hills, made the area accessible through the construction of the Summit Road; much of it was built during the Great Depression in the 1930s. When the Port Hills came under pressure of subdivision, Norman Kirk managed to get the Summit Road (Canterbury) Protection Act passed in 1963, which protected the skyline by not allowing any development from the ridge to 100 metres (330 ft) below the Summit Road. Shortcomings in the legislation did not prevent, however, the construction of the Sugarloaf communications tower or the radar dome on Cass Peak.

Cass Peak has a repeater station for radio signals used by amateur radio, ambulance services, and air traffic control. The prominent radar dome on top of Cass Peak is part of a nationwide system of air traffic management and is operated by Airways New Zealand. The nationwide system was built in the late 1980s and became operational in 1991. Of the six secondary radar stations supplying the two air traffic control centres in Auckland and Christchurch with aircraft position data, Cass Peak is the southernmost in New Zealand.

The Summit Road Society built many new tracks in the Port Hills during the 1980s. In 1985, a track was built at Cass Peak.

Both sides of Cass Peak were significantly burned during the 2017 Port Hills fires.
