= Kennedy's Bush Scenic Reserve =

Conservation reserve in the Port Hills south of Christchurch, New Zealand

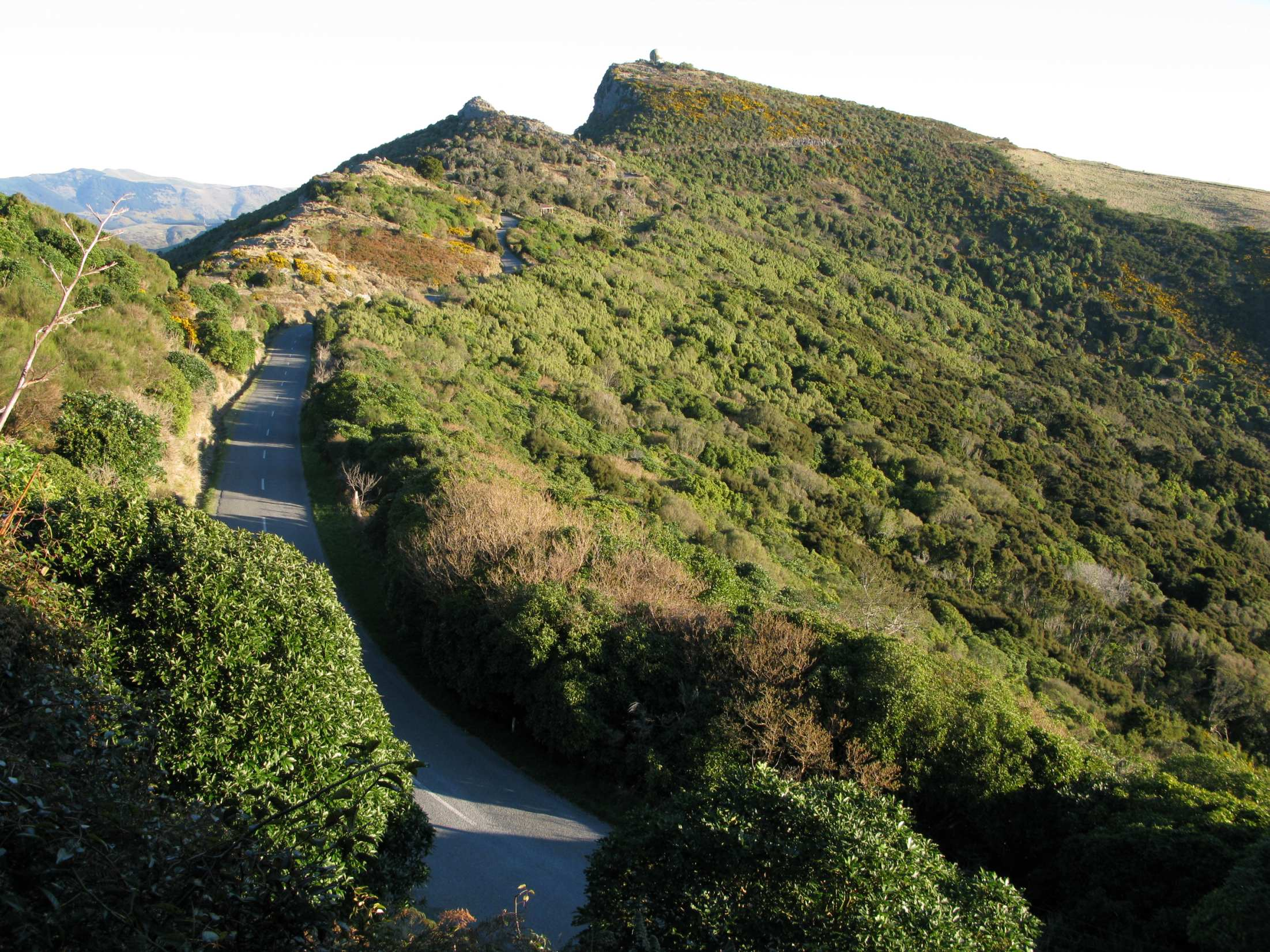
- Kennedy's Bush Scenic Reserve photographed looking south towards Cass Peak.

- Location within Christchurch, New Zealand
- Location: Port Hills
- Nearest city: Christchurch
- Coordinates: 43°37′43″S 172°37′16″E
- Area: 130 hectares (320 acres)
- Elevation: 400 m (1,312.34 ft)
- Created: 1906
- Founder: Harry Ell
- Etymology: Named after Thomas Kennedy
- Operator: Christchurch City Council

Kennedy's Bush Scenic Reserve is a public conservation reserve in the Port Hills south of Christchurch, New Zealand. It sits above the suburb of Kennedys Bush on the northern side of the hills, just north of Ōrongomai / Cass Peak. The reserve is covered in dense native bush, and at 130 hectares (320 acres) it is the largest remaining patch of native bush on the Port Hills.

== Ecology ==
In 1906 a survey found 96 species of flora in the reserve. Today the reserve still contains a wide variety of native species of plant. These include ferns, grasses, trees and climbing flowers, as well as and some threatened species including native speargrass, kānuka, rōhutu, and tōtara. Three different species of stick insects in the genus Tectarchus (T. huttoni, T. ovobessus, and the holotype of T. semilobatus) have been collected from Kennedy's Bush.

Native birds are present in the reserve, including korimako, riroriro, kererū, and pīwakawaka. Tūī were also present during the early 20th century.

Pest control has been ongoing in the area as far back as 1920, when more than 4000 rabbits were trapped in the area. Multiple agencies and community groups have been working to eliminate pest animals in the reserve since the 1990s. Pest species include rats, feral cats, mustelids and possums.

== History ==
The area was originally owned by Thomas Kennedy from 1856, who harvested timber from the forest. Beginning in 1900 politician Harry Ell began a campaign to preserve access to walking tracks and the remaining remnants of native bush on the Port Hills. In 1903 he was instrumental in getting the Scenery Preservation Act through parliament. In 1906 with a subsidy from Prime Minister Richard Seddon and some additional fundraising, he was able to purchase 50 acres (20 ha) of the bush and release it as Crown land. The remainder was acquired by the Scenery Preservation Board after 1908 from landowners including Heaton Rhodes.

There was a fire that destroyed 50 acres (20 ha) of the native forest in 1931, though it mostly only damaged the fringes of the forest.

The reserve contains a number of walking tracks, and is accessible from the Crater Rim walking track. In 2023 a carpark and lookout was opened in the reserve on the south side of Summit Road, opposite the Sign of the Bellbird, with a cost of NZ$370,000.

The reserve avoided sustaining major damage during the 2017 Port Hills fires.

== Management ==
Since 1947, the reserve is owned and administered by the Christchurch City Council, despite technically being outside of Christchurch City.

== Sign of the Bellbird ==
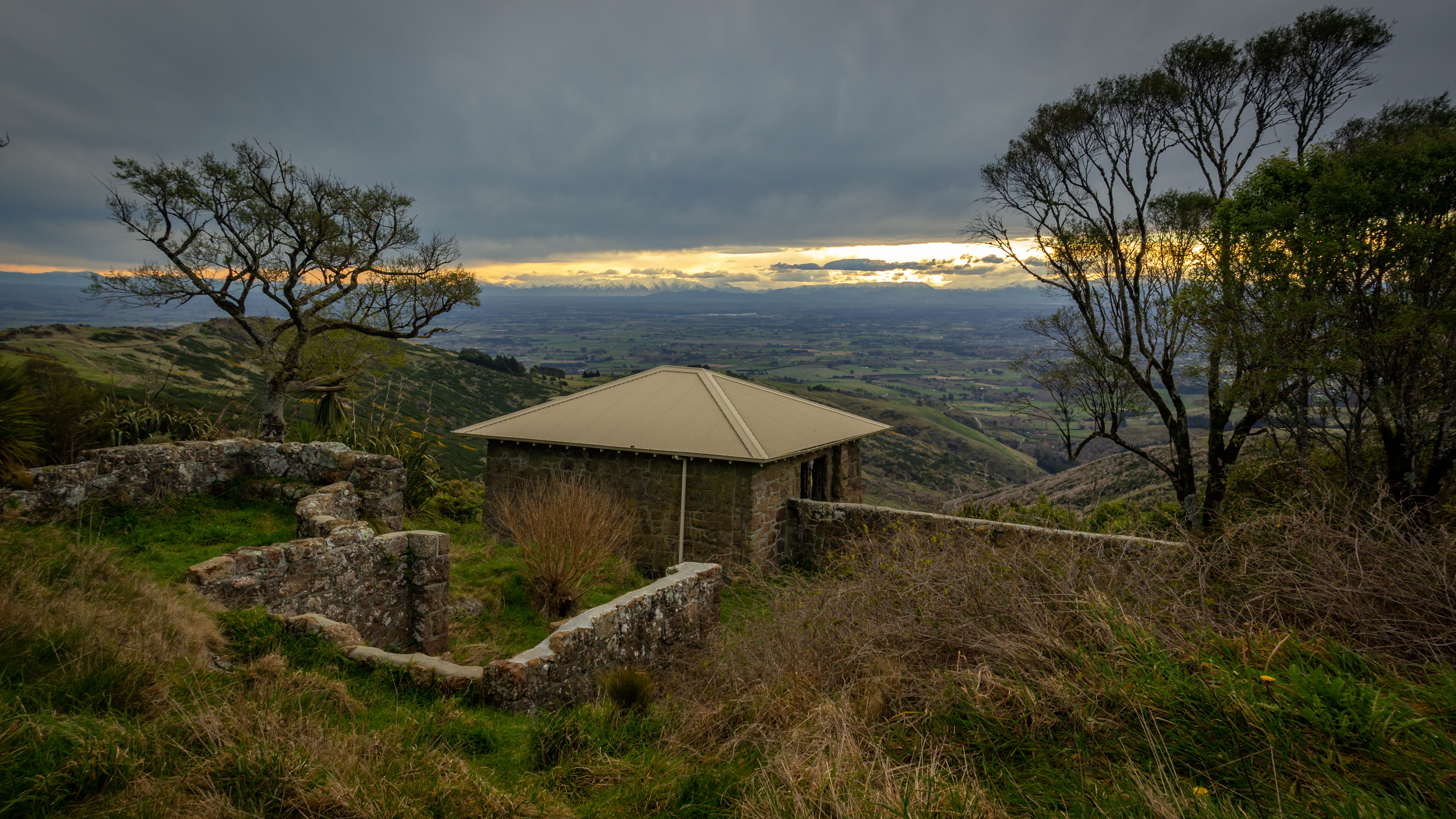
The Sign of the Bellbird, overlooking the Canterbury Plains.

Harry Ell had a vision of a road along the Port Hills, with tea rooms at regular points for visitors to rest at. The first of these was a stone cottage at the top of Kennedy's Bush, which was finished in 1914 and opened in 1915. Designed by Samuel Hurst Seager, it was built from red stone quarried on location. The first caretakers were the Potters, and then the Wilsons from 1915. Ell initially named the resting place Orongomai, which is the te reo Māori name for Cass Peak. In 1922 the location was renamed to be the Sign of the Bellbird. The buildings were the site of a post office and telephone bureau until 1922. Ell died in June 1934.

The buildings were abandoned in 1942. By the mid-1940s it was in a state of disrepair and had been the target of vandalism. In 1947 the Christchurch City Council took over the reserve and began to restore the buildings with a government grant. The buildings were further maintained in 1958, with a new roof built for the dining room. Some buildings were demolished and an open-air shelter for walkers was constructed using the original stone. The roof caught fire in 1967 and was rebuilt in 1971. A fire destroyed the roof again in 2015 and this was replaced in 2017.

== See also ==
- Conservation in New Zealand
- Sign of the Kiwi
- Sign of the Takahe
- Harry Ell
