= Lansdowne, New Zealand =

Lansdowne, New Zealand, may refer to:

- Lansdowne, Canterbury, a locality in Canterbury, New Zealand
- Lansdowne, Masterton, a suburb of Masterton, New Zealand
