= Halswell Quarry Park =

Former quarry in Canterbury, New Zealand

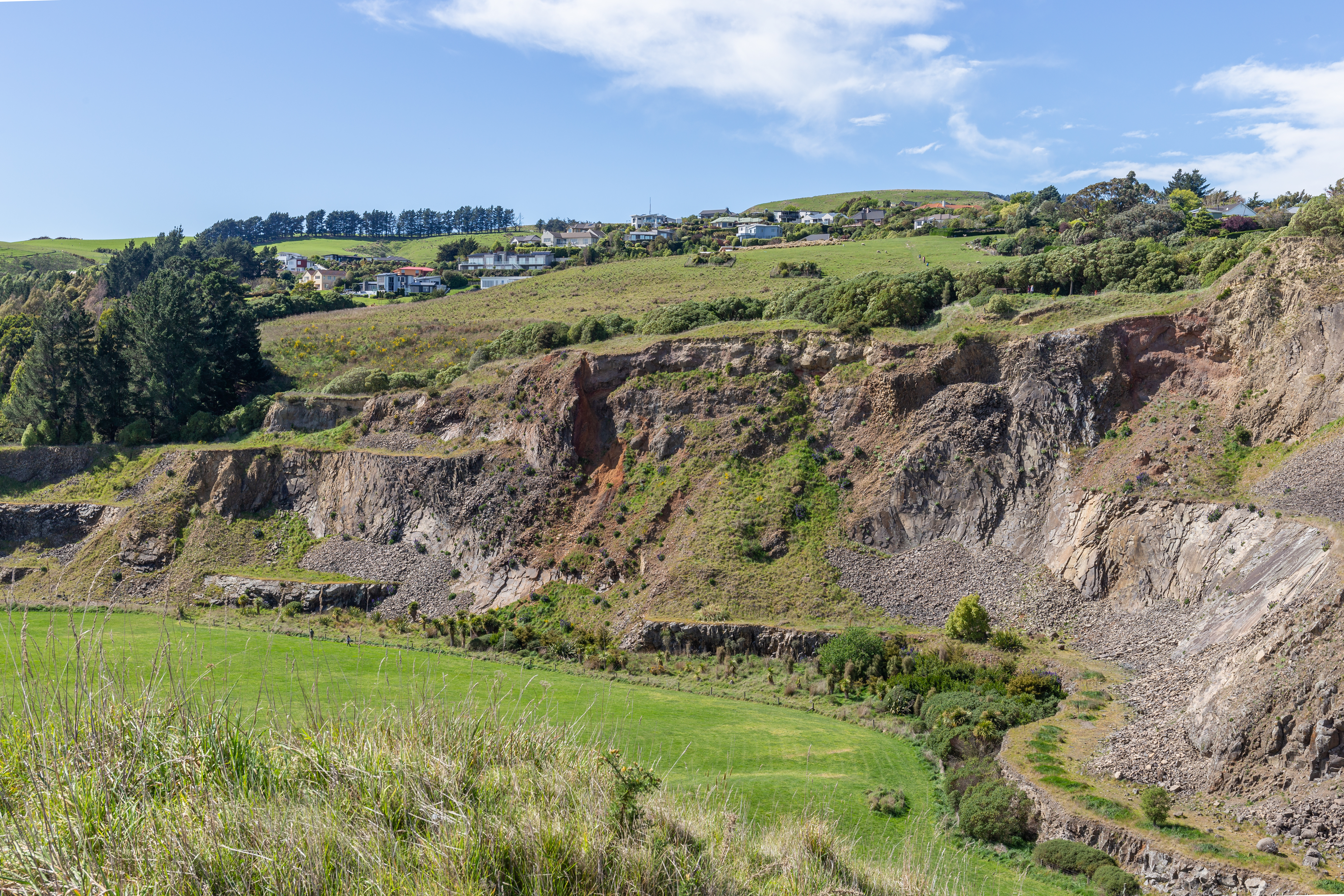
- Interactive map of Halswell Quarry Park
- Location: Christchurch, New Zealand
- Coordinates: 43°36′03″S 172°34′42″E
- Operator: Christchurch City Council

Halswell Quarry Park is located in the suburb of Kennedys Bush at 185 Kennedy's Bush Road in Christchurch, New Zealand. Halswell Quarry operated between 1861 and 1990 before becoming the 60.4 hectares (149 acres) Halswell Quarry Park, one of many Christchurch City Council reserves. It offers a combination of walking and mountain biking tracks, historic sites, picnic areas, botanical collections, and six sister city gardens.

== History of Halswell Quarry ==
Halswell Quarry provided crushed stone for roading and cut stone for significant works including the Canterbury Provincial Council Buildings, Durham Street Methodist Church, Cranmer Court formerly Christchurch Normal School and the Sign of the Takahe. The stone was a distinctive blue-grey colour. The rock formations were first noted by the Deans brothers, who named the outcrop Rock Hill. James Feather and James Forgan opened the quarry in c. 1861. They sold it to Guise Brittan, who took Grosvenor Miles and William White Sr (father of politician of the same name). Brittan sold to the Lincoln Road Tramway Company, and White and William Wilson managed the quarry operations. Wilson took over the quarry, and many important Christchurch buildings were constructed from its stone, including the Canterbury Provincial Council Buildings, Sunnyside Hospital, Durham Street Methodist Church, Canterbury Museum, Normal School, Teachers' College Building, Sign of the Takahe, and the Robert McDougall Art Gallery. In 1925 by the Christchurch City Council who managed it until 1990 when it became commercially unviable due to reduced stone reserves. It is thought to have been the oldest and longest continually operating quarry in Australasia.

== Halswell Quarry buildings ==
Three original buildings are still located in Halswell Quarry Park which are the crusher plant workshop (1912), the singlemen's accommodation barracks (1922), and the manager's residence which is listed in Heritage New Zealand as Halswell Quarry stone house and garden (1927). All three buildings were renovated after the 2011 Christchurch earthquake.

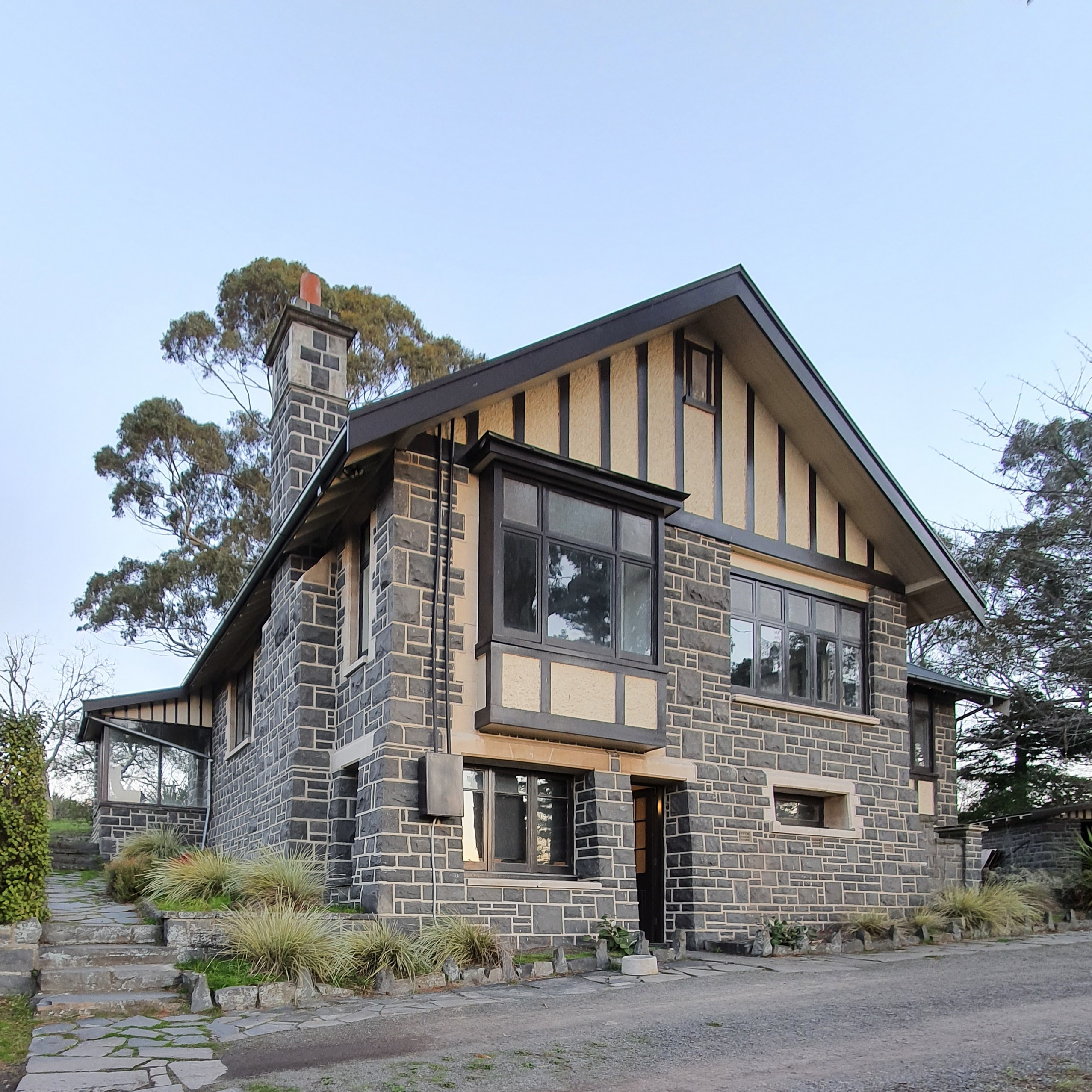
Formerly the manager's residence for Halswell Quarry

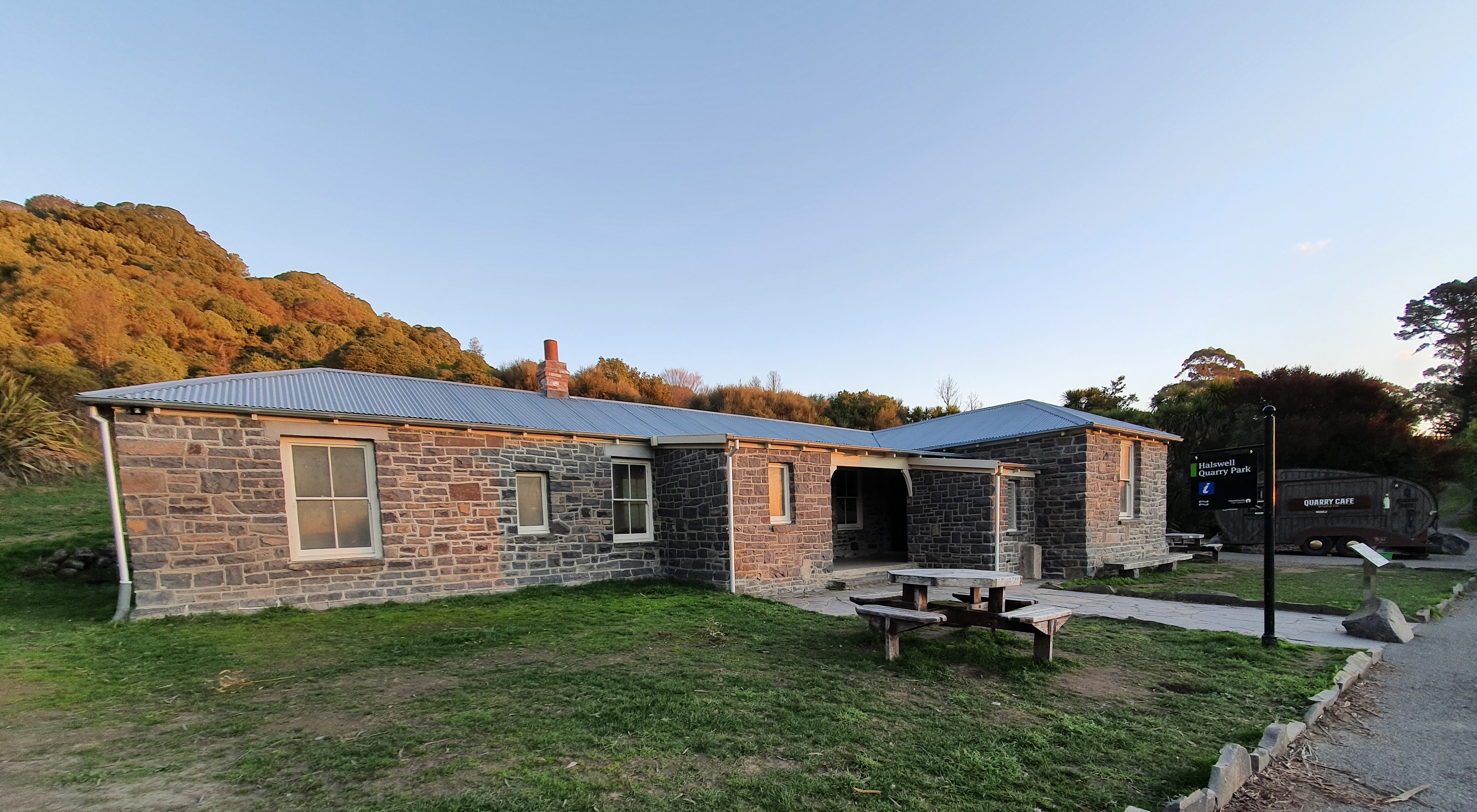
Formerly the singlemen's quarters for Halswell Quarry

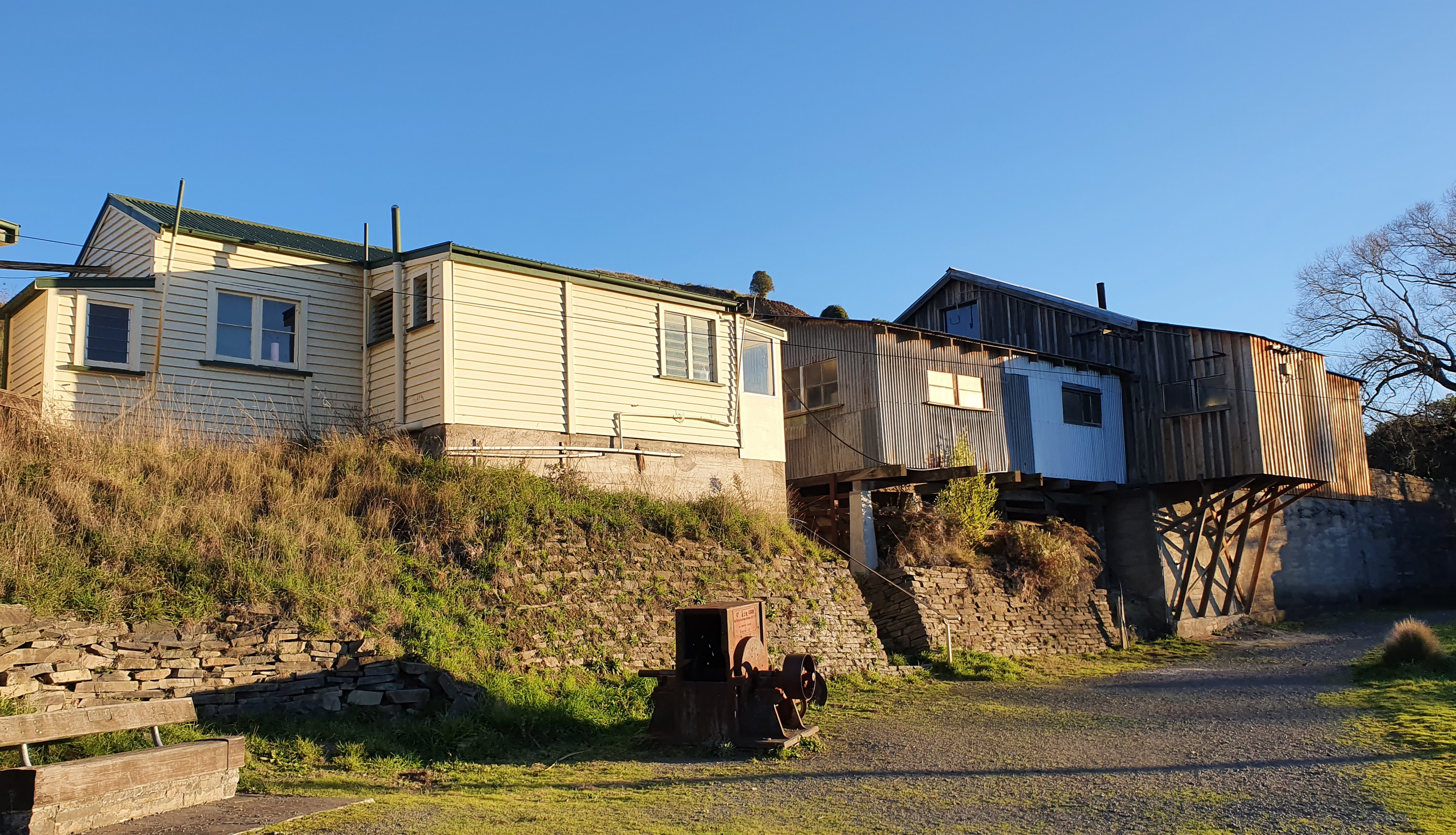
Crusher plant buildings formerly in use at Halswell Quarry

== Halswell Quarry walks and tracks ==
- Canterbury Wetland walk
- Cashmere Hill loop
- Cashmere Road shared use track
- Findlay's walk
- Kennedy's Bush access track
- Quarry Rim track
- Quarry view
- Sister city walks
