= Jean Emily Hay =

New Zealand teacher, broadcaster, early childhood educator

Jean Emily Hay (17 June 1903 – 14 February 1984) was a New Zealand teacher, broadcaster and early childhood educator. She was born in Collie, Western Australia, Australia on 17 June 1903. She taught at the Christchurch Normal School.
