= Sign of the Kiwi =

Rest house in Christchurch, New Zealand

Coordinates: 43.606384°S 172.64524°E

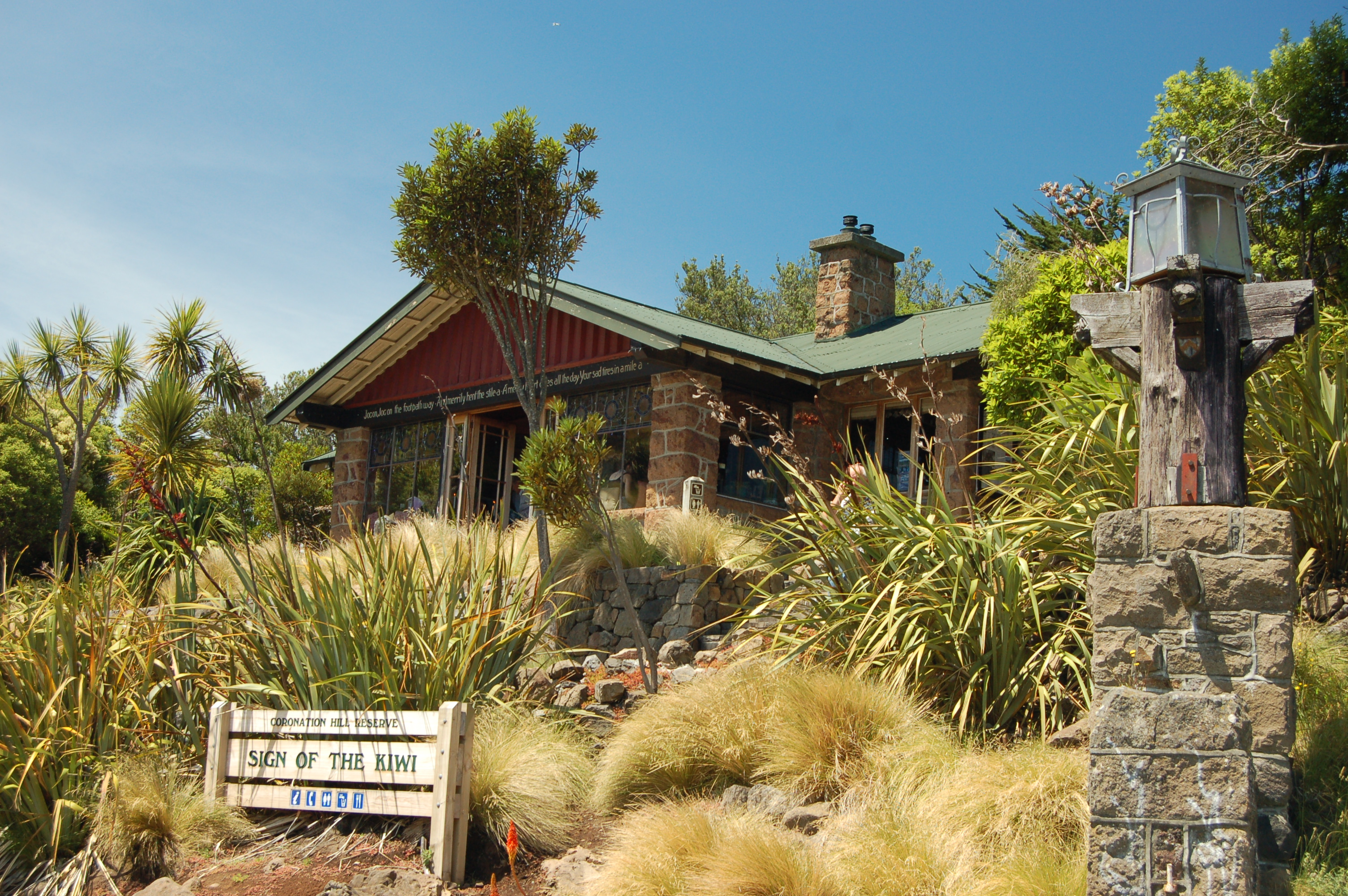
The Sign of the Kiwi, with the toll gate and its lantern in the foreground.

The Sign of the Kiwi, originally called Toll House, is a small café and shop at Dyers Pass on the road between Christchurch and Governors Bay. It was built in 1916–17 by Harry Ell as a staging post and opened as a tearoom and rest house. It has a Category I heritage classification by Heritage New Zealand and is a popular destination for tourists and locals alike. The building was closed some time after the 22 February 2011 Christchurch earthquake and did not open again until 23 January 2017, six years later. Although located within the burned area, the building was not damaged by the 2017 Port Hills fires a month later.

== Historical context ==
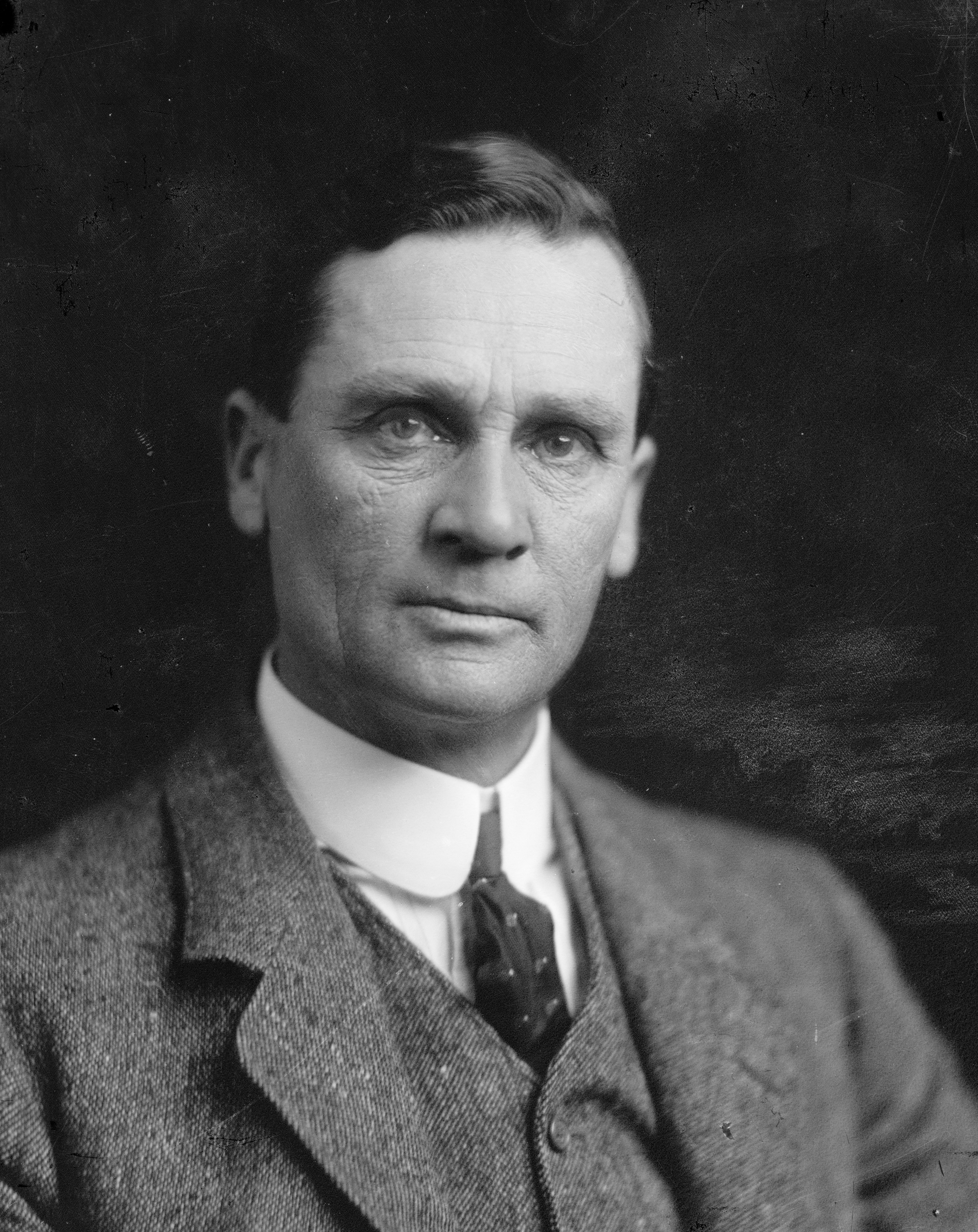
Harry Ell in October 1914

Harry Ell was a Member of Parliament (1899–1919) and a Christchurch City Councillor (1903 and 1917–1919). He devoted much of his life to the conservation of bush remnants on the Port Hills on Banks Peninsula, and a key element in his scheme was to make the area accessible to the public. To that end, he proposed a Summit Road that would go along the hilltops, connecting Godley Head with the tops above Akaroa. Whilst most of the public believed that the scenic reserves to be formed were too remote, Ell had a way with landowners and organised some government funding. His usual style was to pay a deposit for land, with the remainder to be raised later. In 1909, he decided to form a Summit Road Scenic Reserve Board to help with the task of establishing his dream, but there was tension over their scope. The board wanted to have influence on policy, but Ell regarded them as a mere fund-raising body. By 1915, Ell had secured 23 reserves in the Port Hills by buying private land, and none of these projects had the board's prior approval.

By the 1930s, the road had been surveyed as far south as the saddle above Pigeon Bay.

Rest houses were envisaged at regular intervals. The first to be built was the Sign of the Bellbird at Kennedy's Bush in 1914. This was the location of the first scenic reserve that Ell managed to get established in 1906. The Sign of the Packhorse, a smaller house on top of the Kaituna Saddle, was the second one to be established in 1916. The Sign of the Kiwi was the third rest house built by Ell. The Sign of the Takahe was the remaining house to be built.

=== History ===
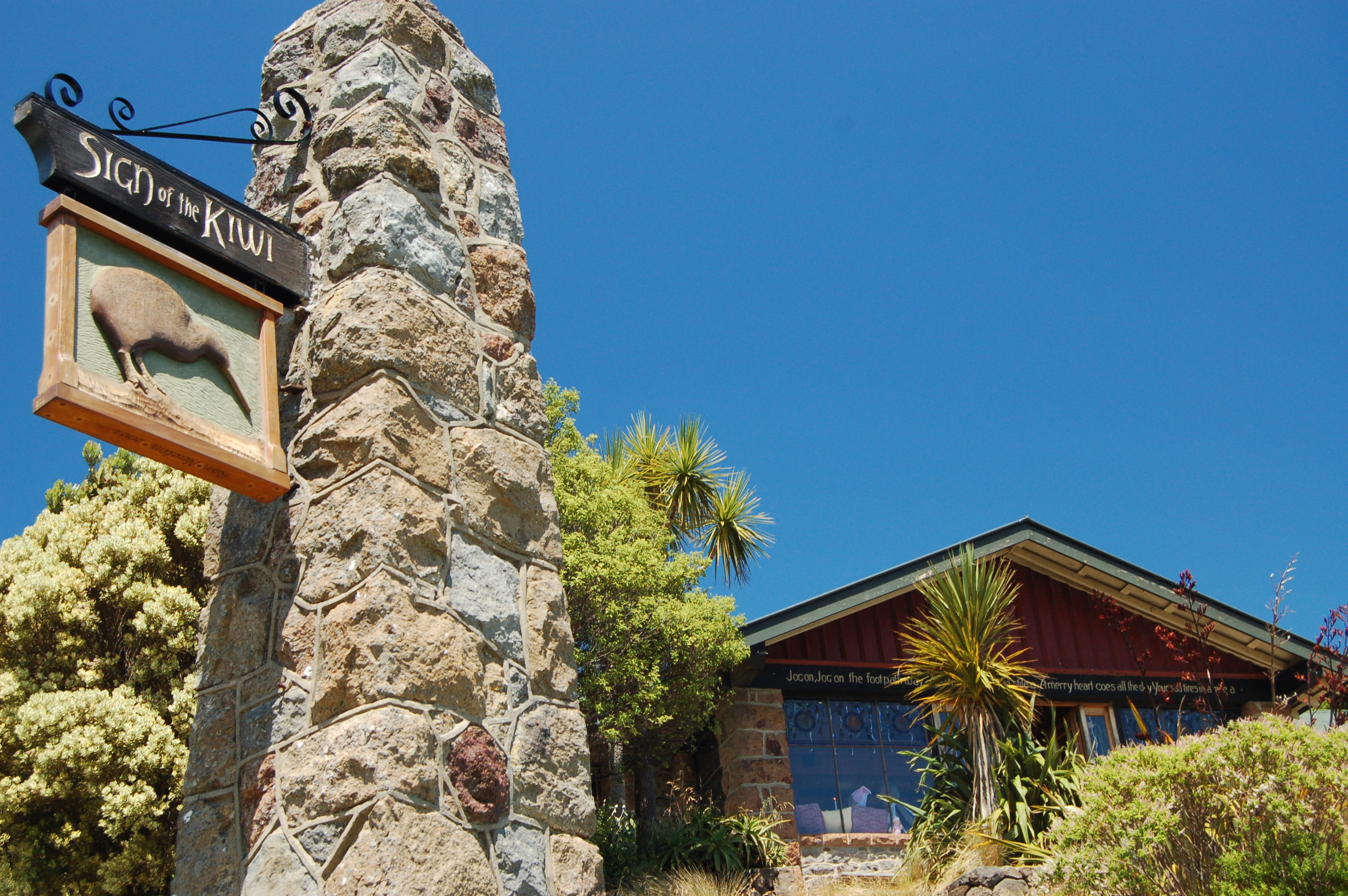
Plinth of the Sign of the Kiwi

The Summit Road Scenic Reserve Board became aware in 1915 that Ell planned to build a toll house in Coronation Hill Reserve. The reserve was established in 1912 to commemorate the coronation of George V in the previous year. The board was opposed to this scheme, but Ell went ahead and the construction of the Toll House, as it was originally called, was started in 1916 with money borrowed from friends and sympathisers. The Sign of the Kiwi was opened on 9 June 1917. Ell's plan was that the collected toll would go towards funding the remainder of the Summit Road that had yet to be built. The toll gate was established in 1922 after the Heathcote County Council consented to its construction.

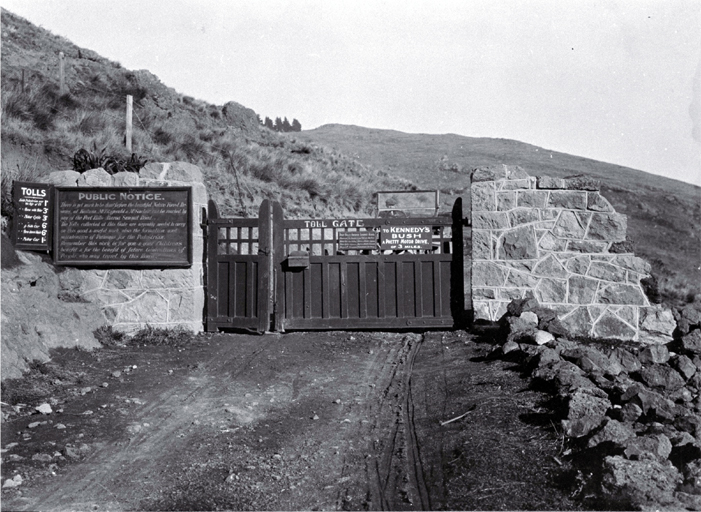
The toll gate before the installation of the lantern.

The toll gate caused considerable controversy. The dispute was over whether the toll should be compulsory. When the Main Highways Board took over the road between the Takahe and the Bellbird from the Heathcote County Council, motorists started to object. They were paying taxes for the road to be maintained, and were tolled to then use the road. The Canterbury Automobile Association lobbied on their behalf and wanted the gate totally removed. The Heathcote County Council suggested that the toll should be optional. Ell was adamant that the toll needed to be compulsory and ever using the media to his effect, he publicly declared:

I am making my will tomorrow, and am going to live in the toll house myself – and I am not coming out alive! ... I am going to move up there and take the tolls myself, until they kill me.

In October 1932, the Heathcote County Council instructed Ell to stop collecting tolls by the end of the month. The adjacent Halswell County Council came to the rescue, though. They saw the advantage of Ell collecting tolls for the maintenance of the Summit Road going through their area, and they suggested that the toll gate be relocated. Ell erected a new toll gate half a mile further south on Halswell County Council near Marley Hill and declared that a new toll lodge in Tudor style was to be built there. This did not happen, though, as Ell died in June 1934. At that time, the new toll gate was removed, too.

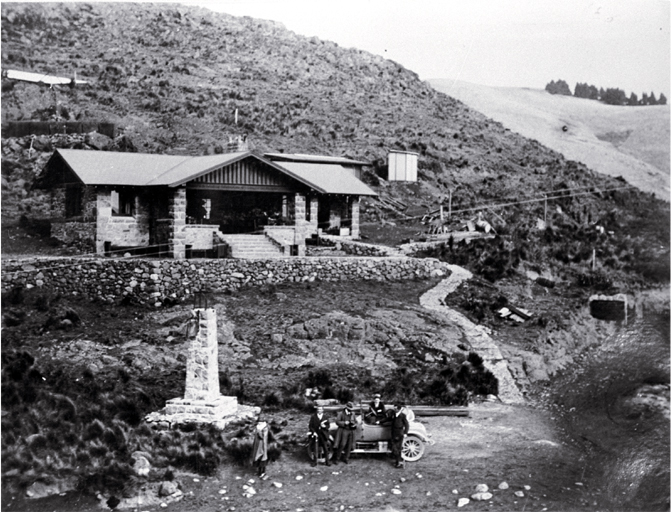
A car and excursionists in front of the Sign of the Kiwi, ca 1922.

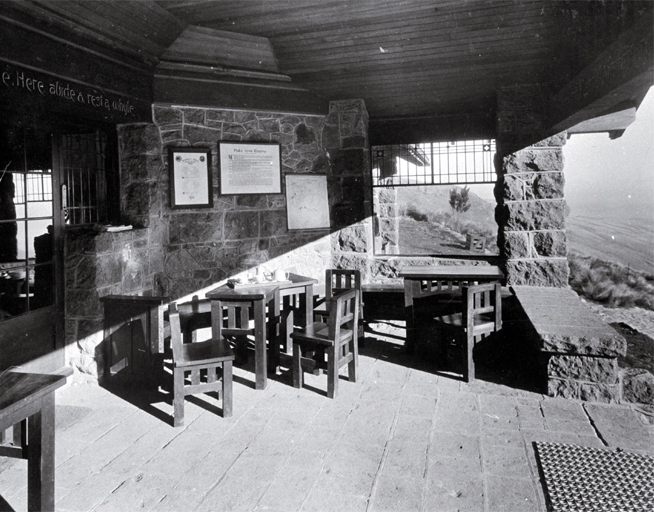
The verandah of the Sign of the Kiwi, ca 1925.

In 1920, Ell's wife Ada took over the running of the tea rooms in the Sign of the Kiwi. This had resulted from a conflict with the Summit Road Scenic Reserve Board. When a new chairman, businessman William Machin, took over the running of the board, he advertised in all four Christchurch newspapers that the board would not be responsible for debts incurred by Ell. Ell in turn was incensed, wrote to the Prime Minister William Massey and got the new Commissioner of Crown Lands in Christchurch to appoint him as caretaker of the Sign of the Kiwi. The board objected to this move, but Ell simply moved in. His wife taking over the running of the tea rooms saved the situation. Unlike the previous operator, she managed to make a profit every year, but suffered a nervous breakdown in 1926, which forced her to move out.

World War II caused the Sign of the Kiwi to be abandoned, and the Department of Lands and Survey closed the building in the 1940s. In 1948, ownership was transferred to Christchurch City Council, which used it as a custodian's residence. Public access was restricted to the porch. Renovation for a refreshment place started in 1989, and it was opened again, acting also as an information centre. Many recreational opportunities exist in the vicinity, and the Sign of the Kiwi is popular with locals and tourists alike.

The 22 February 2011 Christchurch earthquake damaged the shop at Sign of the Kiwi, but it took some time to recognise the seriousness of the situation and the building remained open for some time. It was stabilised to prevent further damage. A detailed engineering assessment found that it had an estimated seismic strength of just 9.5% of the building code, while the legal lower limit is 33% of code. The repair and structural upgrade, which started in October 2015, cost NZ$760,000, and the Sign of the Kiwi reopened on 23 January 2017. Whilst (just) located within the area that burned in the 2017 Port Hills fires, the building was undamaged by this event.

== Architecture ==
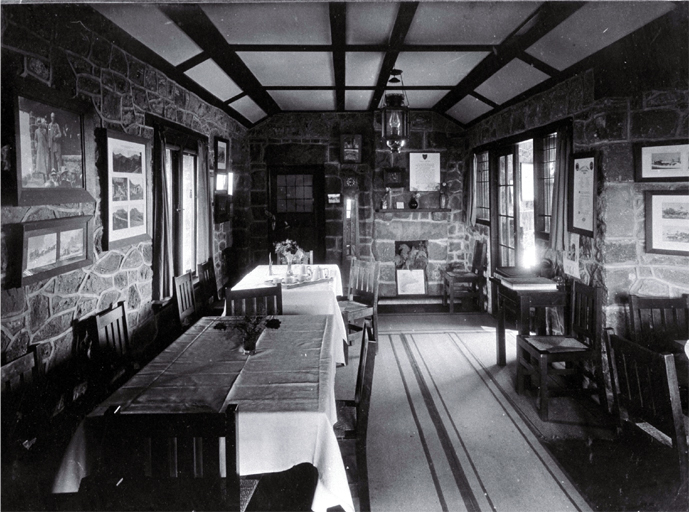
The interior of the Sign of the Kiwi, ca 1927.

The Sign of the Kiwi was designed by local architect Samuel Hurst Seager, who became an international authority on the lighting of art galleries. Seager had also designed the two earlier rest houses along the Summit Road. He had a strong interest in vernacular architecture, described as a method of construction that uses locally available resources and traditions to address local needs and circumstances. The building is in the bungalow style and unlined, which gives the building strong features on the inside. The use of local stone, the careful siting, and the low construction make the building blend in well with its surroundings.

== Heritage listing ==
On 21 September 1989, the Sign of the Kiwi was registered by the New Zealand Historic Places Trust as a Category I historic place, with the registration number being 1930. It is significant in the history of the Summit Road, and part of the earliest attempt of nature conservation in New Zealand. It is an important example of Seager's vernacular architecture. The toll gate and the stone pillar outside the building are included in the heritage listing.

== See also ==
- Sign of the Takahe
- Sign of the Bellbird
