= Kennedys Bush =

- Suburb
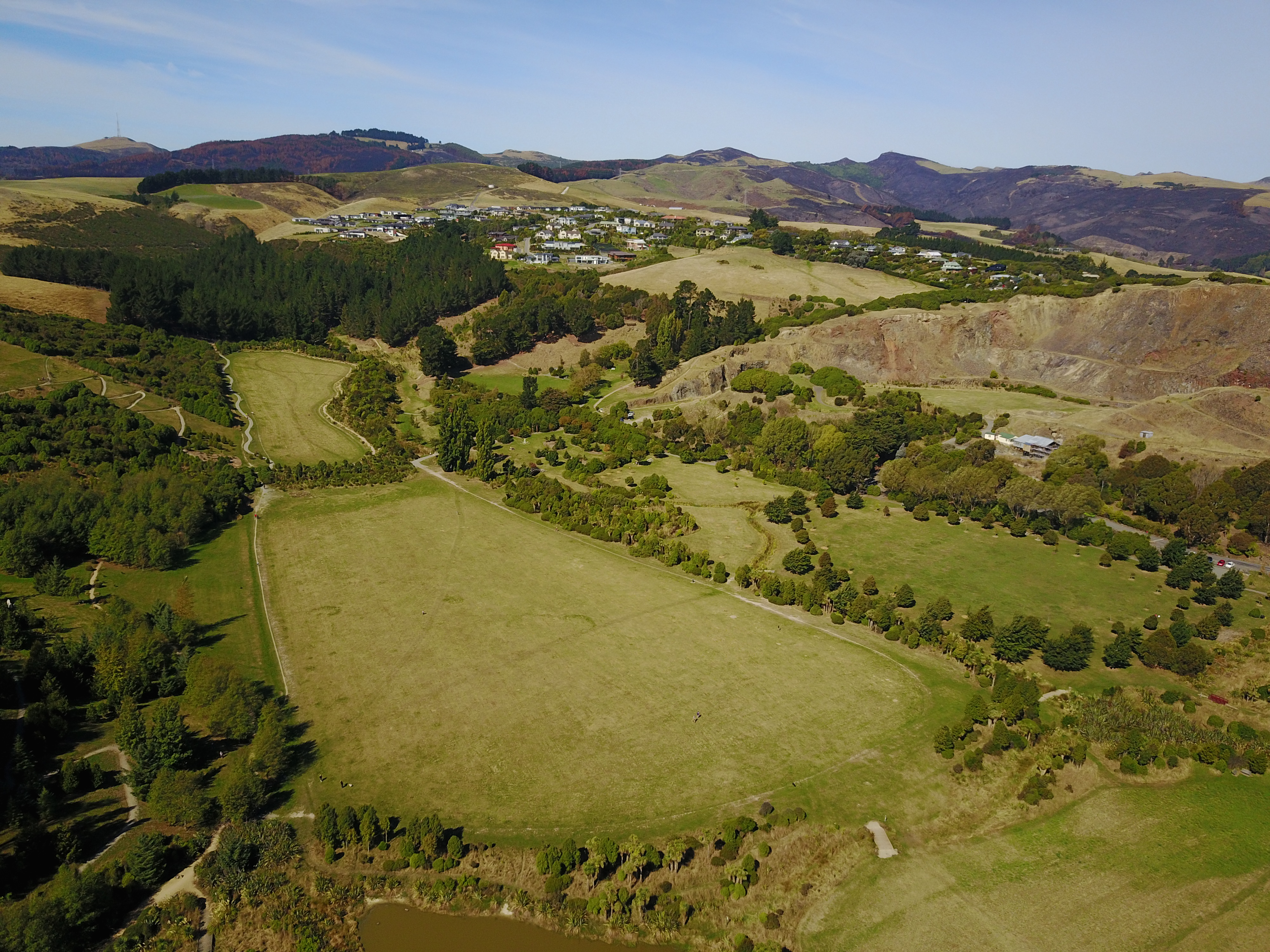
- Aerial view of Halswell Quarry
- Interactive map of Kennedys Bush
- Coordinates: 43.603°S 172.583°E
- Country: New Zealand
- City: Christchurch
- Local authority: Christchurch City Council
- Electoral ward: Halswell

Area
  - Land: 988 ha (2,440 acres)

Population (June 2025)
  - Total: 1,450
  - Density: 147/km^{2} (380/sq mi)

Halswell		Westmorland
	Kennedys Bush	Port Hills
Ladbrooks	Lansdowne

Kennedys Bush is a south-western suburb of Christchurch, New Zealand.

== History ==
Kennedys Bush was first settled by Thomas Kennedy, an Irishman born in Cork around 1819, who arrived in New Zealand from the United States in 1838. He met Sophia Streeter in Wellington and they later married.

In 1841, the couple moved to Akaroa where Kennedy worked as a constable for the French settlers. Five of the Kennedy's twelve children were born in Akaroa.

In 1856, Kennedy bought 28 acres on the hills above Halswell with a licence to cut the bush.

Kennedy opened a sawmill and felled trees from the bush using a team of bullocks to haul the processed timber on a sledge down a track. This was known as "Kennedys Track". Later it became "Quarry Road" then "Pattersons Road" (after one of the quarry managers), and eventually "Kennedys Bush Road".

The full length of the road was surveyed in the late 1850s and constructed in 1863.

Kennedy established the first timber business in Christchurch selling sawn timber, posts and rails and firewood-all sourced from the hills above Halswell. He built two houses, the first in the bush, the second on flat land opposite the present quarry park. He named this "Waterford". Neither house remains, though the site of the Kennedy home is now a featured location on one of the bush walks in Kennedy's Bush Scenic Reserve below the Sign of the Bellbird.

The flat land at Kennedys Bush was originally owned by W. G. Brittan and Michael J. Burke who bought it as part of the Lansdowne Run from the Canterbury Association in 1851. Brittan bought Burke out in 1860 and in 1873 sold a block of land on the south side of Kennedys Track to Premier Sir Edward Stafford who lived in Old Tai Tapu Road in his house called "Lansdowne".

In 1859, relatives of Kennedy's wife Sophia arrived from Australia to work for Kennedy. These included Alfred Streeter who married Margaret Watkins. The young couple bought an acre of land from Sir Edward Stafford in 1874 and built a house on the corner of Kennedys Bush Road and Glovers Road. They raised twelve children there. This house still stands, probably the oldest surviving dwelling in Kennedys Bush.

The first residential subdivision in the area was in 1913. In 1954, the Christchurch City Council sold 32 subdivided sections on the quarry-side of Kennedys Bush Road, possibly to help fund the royal visit that year.

Halswell Quarry Park is located within Kennedys Bush.

== Demographics ==
Kennedys Bush statistical area covers 9.88 km^{2} (3.81 sq mi). It had an estimated population of 1,450 as of June 2025, with a population density of 147 people per km^{2}.

Historical population
Year	Pop.	±% p.a.
2006	684	—
2013	735	+1.03%
2018	792	+1.51%
2023	885	+2.25%
The 2006 population is for a larger area of 12.01 km^{2}. Source:

Kennedys Bush had a population of 885 in the 2023 New Zealand census, an increase of 93 people (11.7%) since the 2018 census, and an increase of 150 people (20.4%) since the 2013 census. There were 432 males and 450 females in 330 dwellings. 2.4% of people identified as LGBTIQ+. The median age was 54.3 years (compared with 38.1 years nationally). There were 123 people (13.9%) aged under 15 years, 114 (12.9%) aged 15 to 29, 420 (47.5%) aged 30 to 64, and 228 (25.8%) aged 65 or older.

People could identify as more than one ethnicity. The results were 93.9% European (Pākehā); 3.1% Māori; 0.7% Pasifika; 5.1% Asian; 1.7% Middle Eastern, Latin American and African New Zealanders (MELAA); and 3.4% other, which includes people giving their ethnicity as "New Zealander". English was spoken by 98.3%, Māori by 0.7%, and other languages by 11.2%. No language could be spoken by 1.4% (e.g. too young to talk). The percentage of people born overseas was 21.4, compared with 28.8% nationally.

Religious affiliations were 36.9% Christian, 0.3% Buddhist, 0.3% New Age, 0.3% Jewish, and 0.7% other religions. People who answered that they had no religion were 54.9%, and 6.4% of people did not answer the census question.

Of those at least 15 years old, 336 (44.1%) people had a bachelor's or higher degree, 336 (44.1%) had a post-high school certificate or diploma, and 87 (11.4%) people exclusively held high school qualifications. The median income was $57,400, compared with $41,500 nationally. 240 people (31.5%) earned over $100,000 compared to 12.1% nationally. The employment status of those at least 15 was 369 (48.4%) full-time, 135 (17.7%) part-time, and 9 (1.2%) unemployed.
