= Cracroft Reserve =

Coordinates: 43°34′48.4″S 172°38′3.8″E

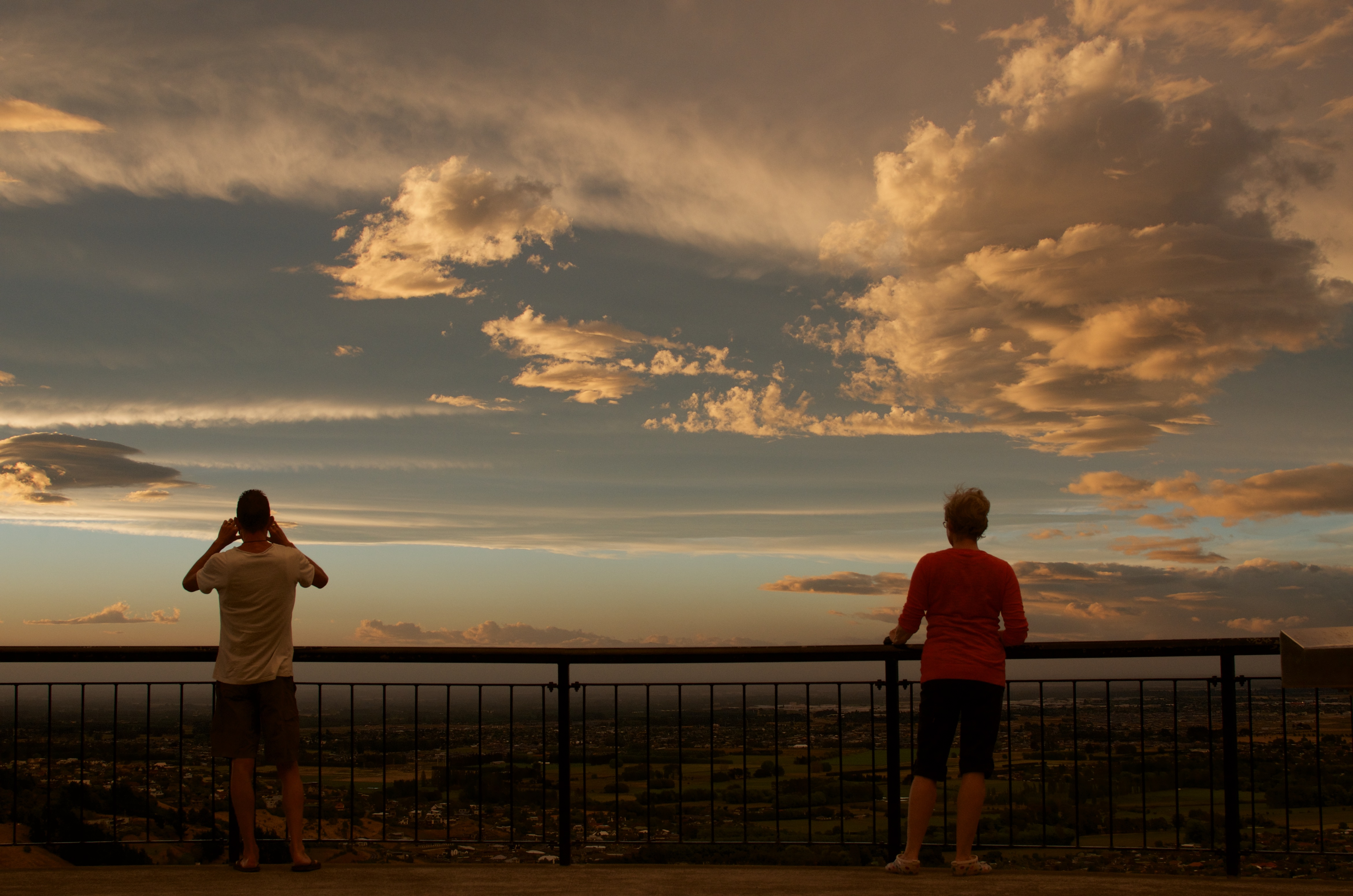
Watching Christchurch city from Cracroft Reserve

Cracroft Reserve is a 3.2-hectare (7.9-acre) public reserve on Cracroft Hill in the Cashmere suburb of Christchurch, New Zealand. It is situated next to the Sign of the Takahe. Cracroft Reserve is a popular stop for tourists, and residents, with its viewing platform at 200 metres (660 ft) elevation providing panoramic views of Christchurch city, the Canterbury Plains, and the Southern Alps. The main entrance to the reserve is from the southern end of Hackthorne Road.

The reserve features a sturdy stainless steel plane table pointing to a wide range of landmarks visible from Cracroft Reserve, from Aoraki / Mount Cook to the south to Mount Tapuaenuku to the north. This sign, set on a Halswell stone base, was erected by the Rotary Club of Christchurch in 1967.

Cracroft Reserve is named after John Cracroft Wilson. Cracroft Wilson sold the property, once part of the larger Cashmere farm, to the city in about 1925, as part of prominent local politician Harry Ell's initiative to establish a network of reserves, rest houses, and tracks through the Christchurch Port Hills.

In November 2025, the Ministry for Culture and Heritage announced it has chosen Cracroft Reserve to be the preferred future site of the New Zealand government's planned national memorial for the 257 people who died in the Mount Erebus plane disaster in Antarctica in 1979.
