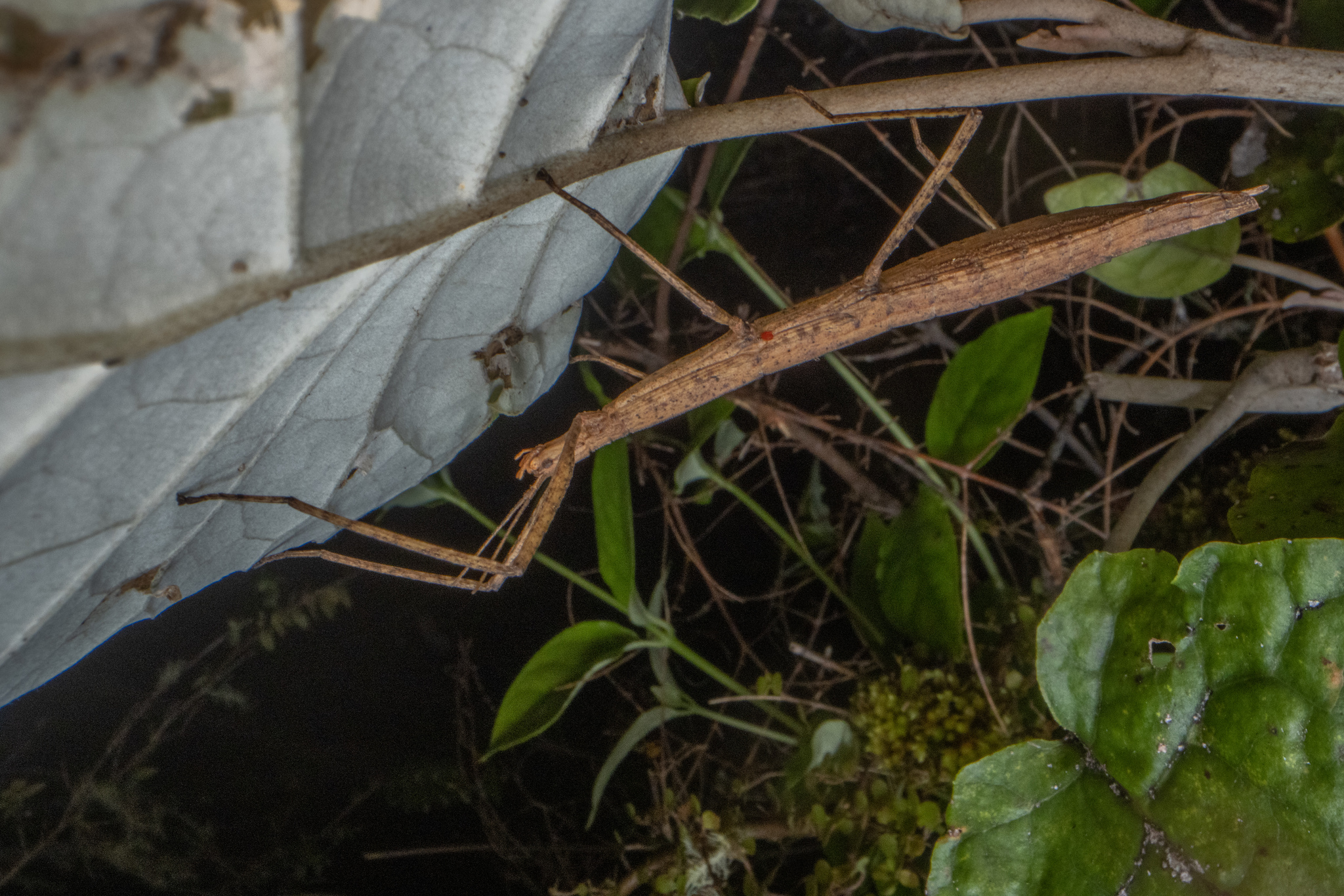

Scientific classification
- Kingdom: Animalia
- Phylum: Arthropoda
- Class: Insecta
- Order: Phasmatodea
- Family: Phasmatidae
- Genus: Tectarchus; Salmon, 1954
- Species: T. ovobessus

Binomial name
- Tectarchus ovobessus Salmon, 1954

= Tectarchus ovobessus =

Species of stick insect

Tectarchus ovobessus, the ridgebacked stick insect, is a species of Diapheromeridae. It was described as the type species of a new genus in 1954.

== Description ==
A stick insect with a raised keel along the back.

== Range ==
New Zealand.

== Ecology ==
The whole genus Tectarchus is parasitized by nematodes.
