= Lansdowne, Canterbury =

Coordinates: 43°37′03″S 172°35′20″E

Lansdowne, also spelled Lansdown, is a locality south of Christchurch, New Zealand.

Lansdowne is located on Old Tai Tapu Road and Early Valley Road. The roads are the boundary between two territorial authorities, with the north and east sides belonging to Christchurch City and the south and west sides to Selwyn District.

Lansdowne was the name of a sheep station given in 1851 by Guise Brittan, who named it after the Lansdown in Bath, Somerset. The Lansdowne Stables off Old Tai Tapu Road are registered by Heritage New Zealand as a Category II heritage item. Brittan built his first house on the property in 1857 but it burned down the following year. Brittan then built a substantial house with stones quarried from the nearby Halswell Quarry, but went bankrupt in the process. The next owner of the property was Edward Stafford. The property was next sold after Stafford died in 1901. Lansdowne Homestead and the adjacent park were bought in 1995 by Haydn Rawstron who gifted the property to a trust founded by him (the John Robert Godley Memorial Trust, with the name commemorating the founder of Canterbury).
