= Peterborough Centre =

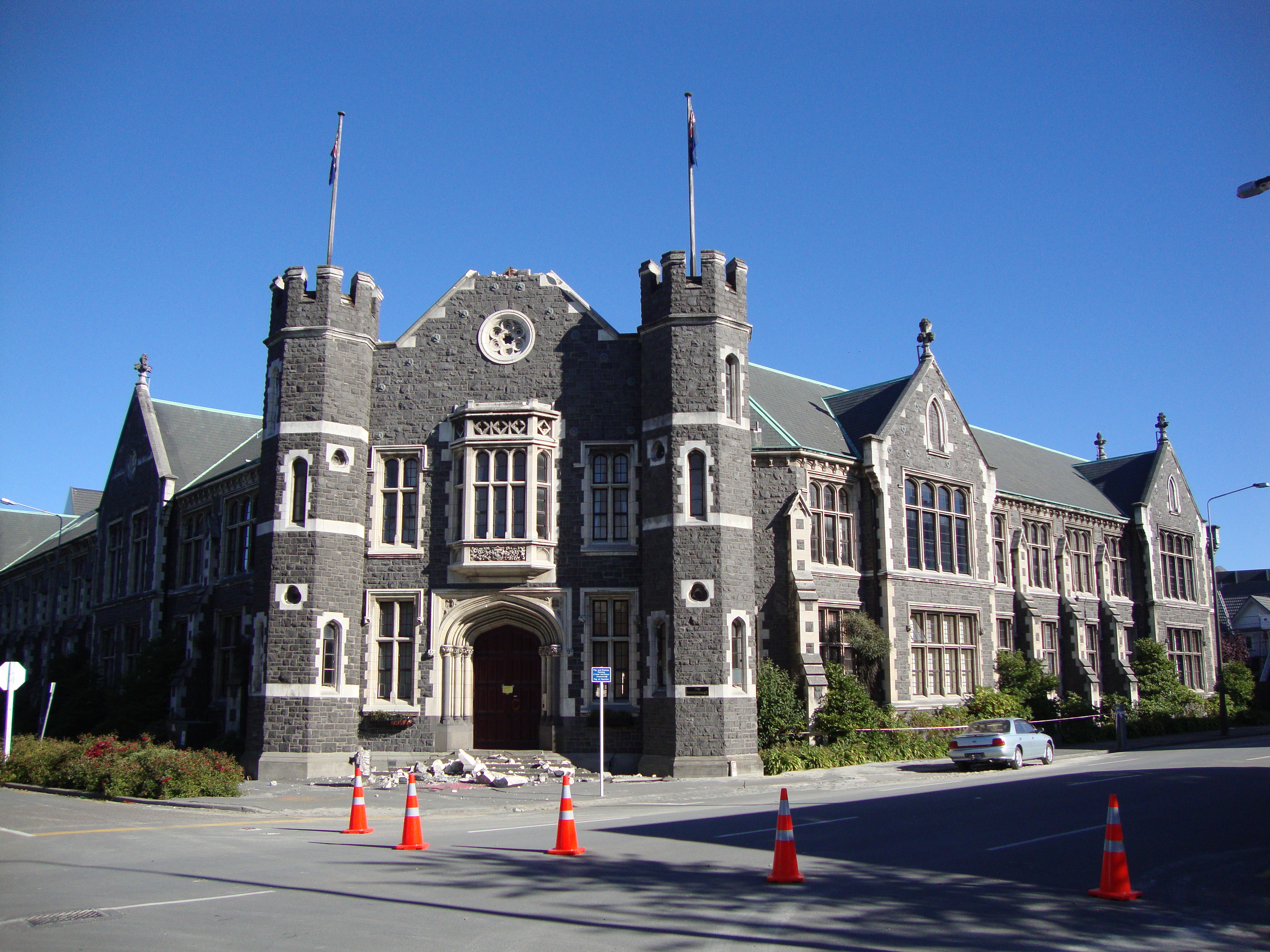
- The Peterborough Centre with damage from the February 2011 Christchurch earthquake

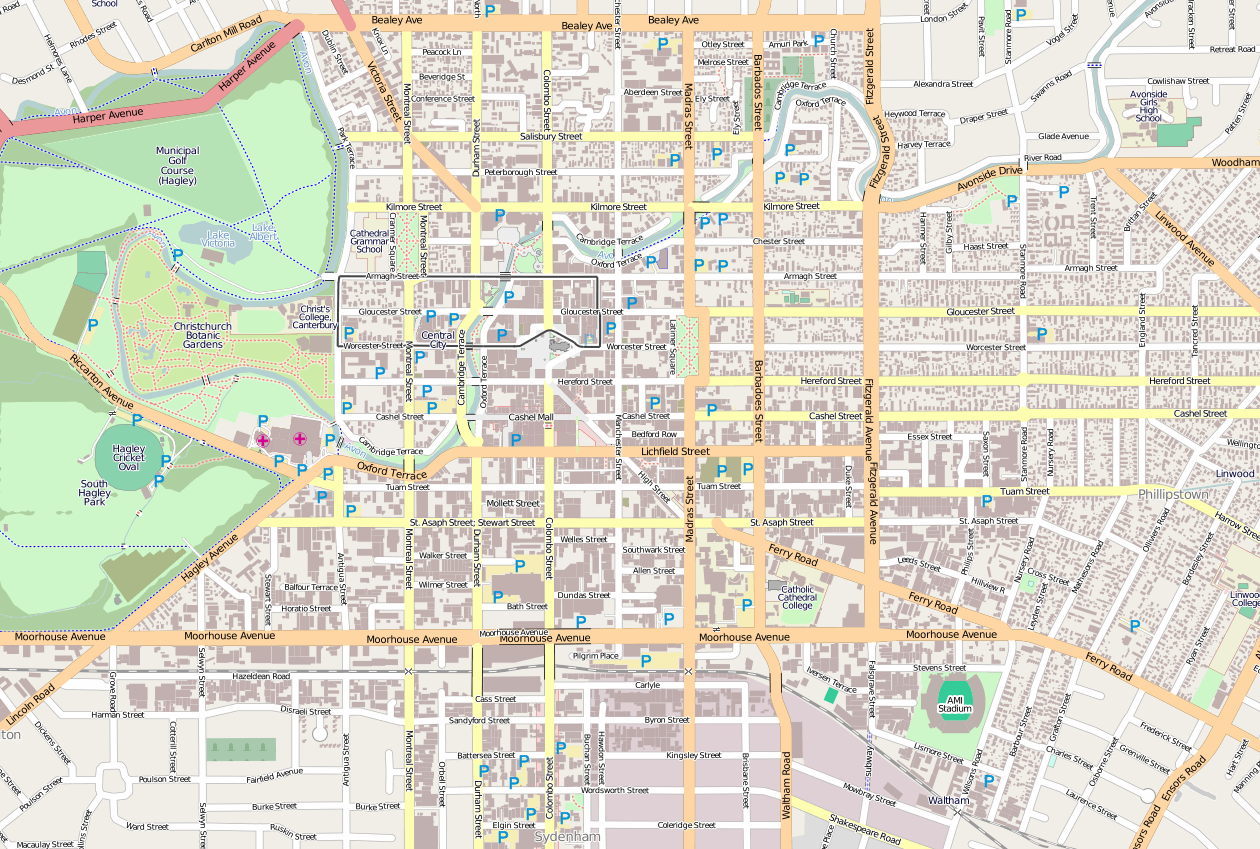
- Location within Christchurch
- Former names: Teachers' College Building

General information
- Type: Education building
- Architectural style: Gothic Revival
- Location: corner Peterborough and Montreal Streets, 25 Peterborough Street, Christchurch, New Zealand
- Coordinates: 43°31′30″S 172°37′47″E
- Completed: 1930
- Client: Canterbury Education Board

Design and construction
- Architect: George Penlington

Renovating team
- Architect: Stewart Ross

Heritage New Zealand – Category 2
- Designated: 26 November 1981
- Reference no.: 1914

References
- "Peterborough Centre". New Zealand Heritage List/Rārangi Kōrero. Heritage New Zealand.

The Peterborough Centre, the former Teachers' College Building, is located on the corner of Peterborough and Montreal Streets in Christchurch, New Zealand. It is a Category II heritage building. As a result of the February 2011 Christchurch earthquake, it suffered NZ$12 million in damage.

== History ==
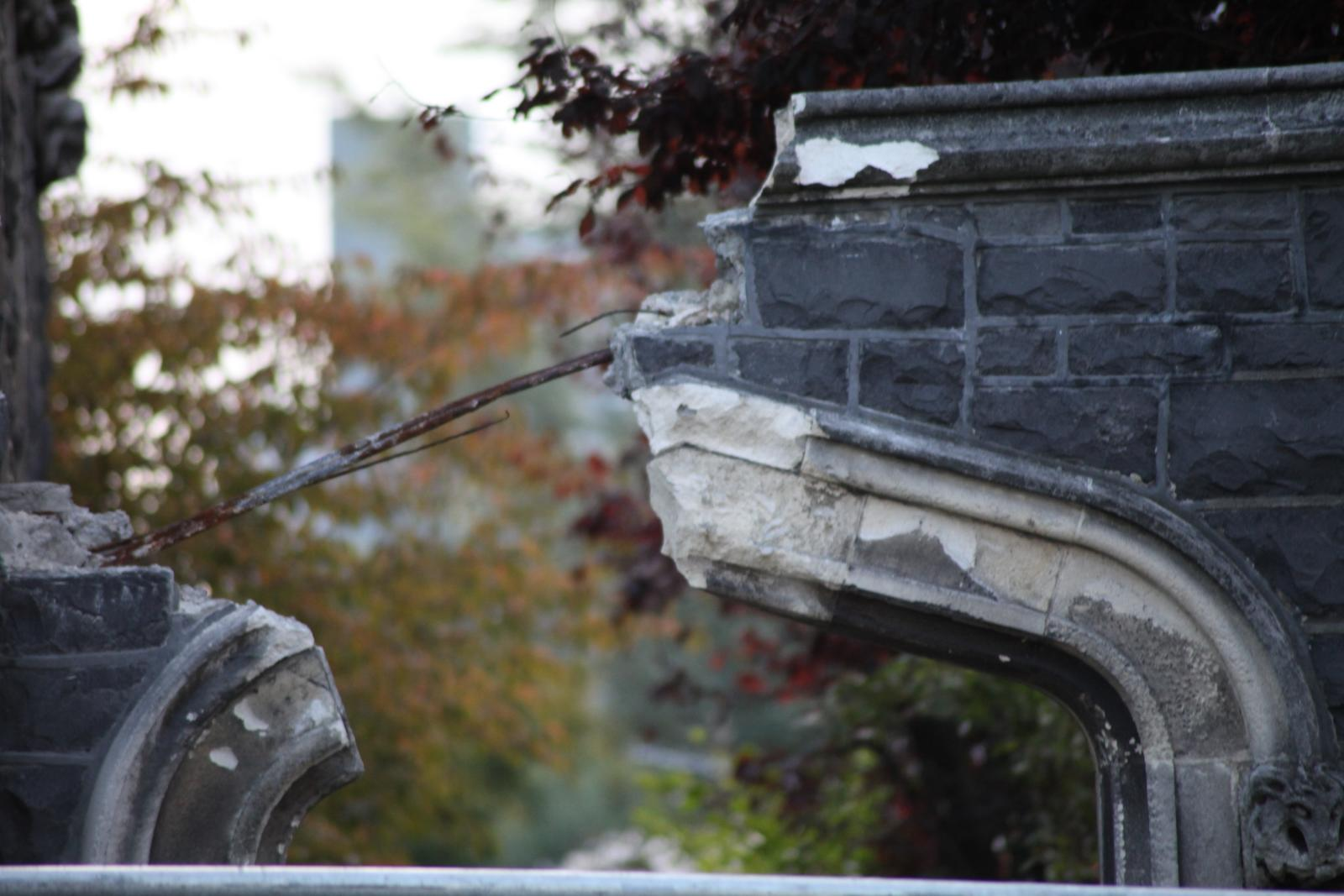
Broken entrance arch at the north end of the complex

Completed in 1930, the Christchurch Teachers’ Training College was designed in Gothic Revival style by George Penlington, the Canterbury Education Board Architect. The unstable ground, with a high peat content, caused the building to settle and crack within a year of construction. The training college had a close connection to the nearby Christchurch Normal School, later known as Cranmer Court. The Normal School provided a 'normal' school environment where since 1877, trainee teachers could observe their experienced peers in a teaching environment. The trainee teachers were based at the Normal School until the Teachers' College Building was built for them.

Stewart Ross was the architect responsible for converting the school into the current Peterborough apartments, while Robert Douglas Brown was the developer. An underground car park was created in the courtyard as part of the conversion to apartments. The survey plans for the subdivision into individual titles are from 1998.

February 2011 earthquake

The building suffered significant damage in the 22 February 2011 Christchurch earthquake, with repairs estimated to cost NZ$12m, whilst the building is insured for NZ$12.3m. With most owners "committed to rebuilding", the heritage building may be retained. The front entrance is red stickered (no access), while most individual units are yellow stickered (restricted access). Much damage was caused by the underground car park floating upwards due to liquefaction of the ground.

== Heritage listing and awards ==
On 26 November 1981, the building was registered by the New Zealand Historic Places Trust as a Category II historic place, with the registration number 1914. The apartment conversion received a 'Heritage and Conservation Award' from the New Zealand Institute of Architects.
