= Sign of the Takahe =

Coordinates: 43°34′53.6″S 172°38′7.2″E

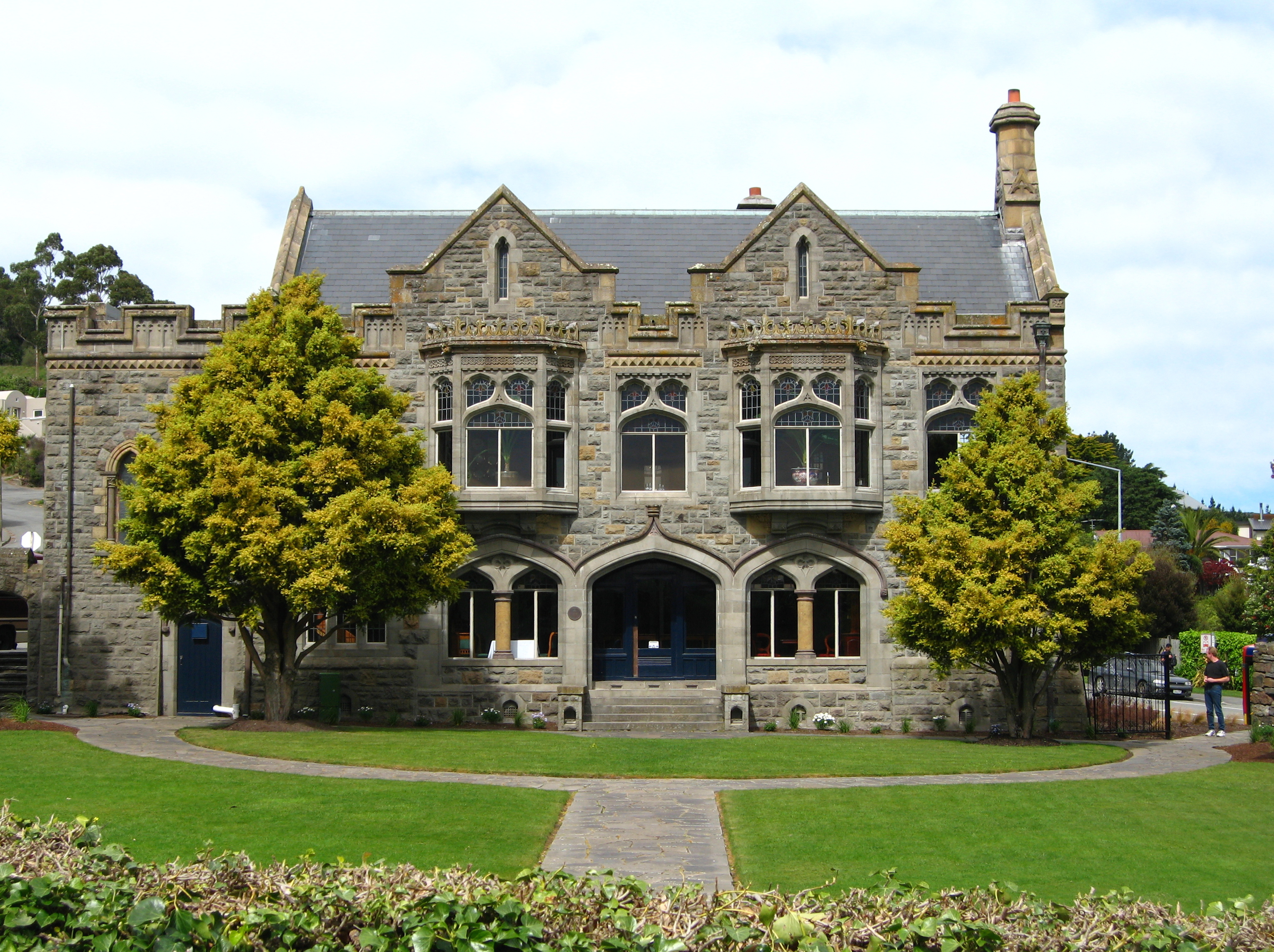
The Sign of the Takahe

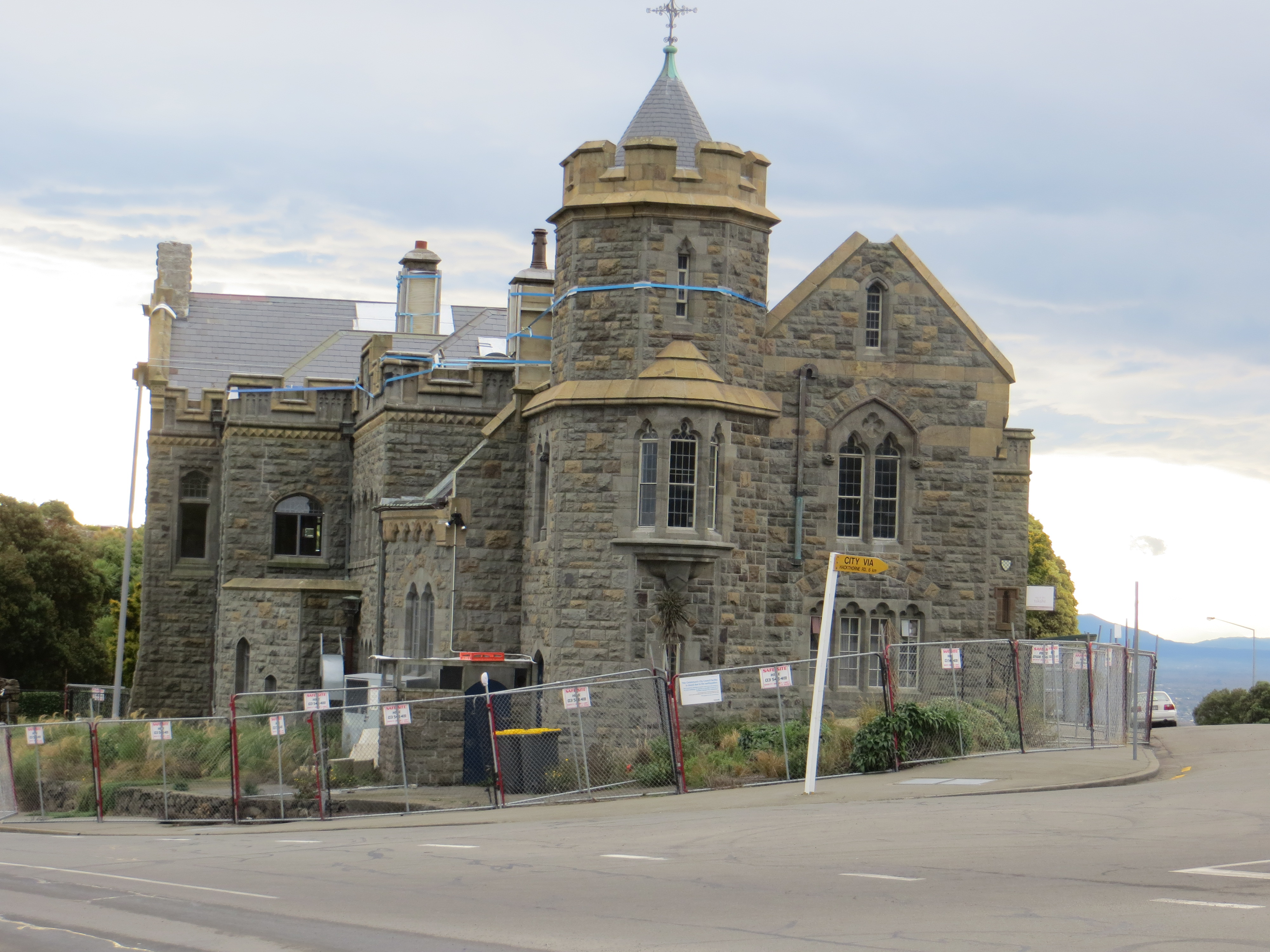
Earthquake damaged Sign of the Takahe in 2013 viewed from south

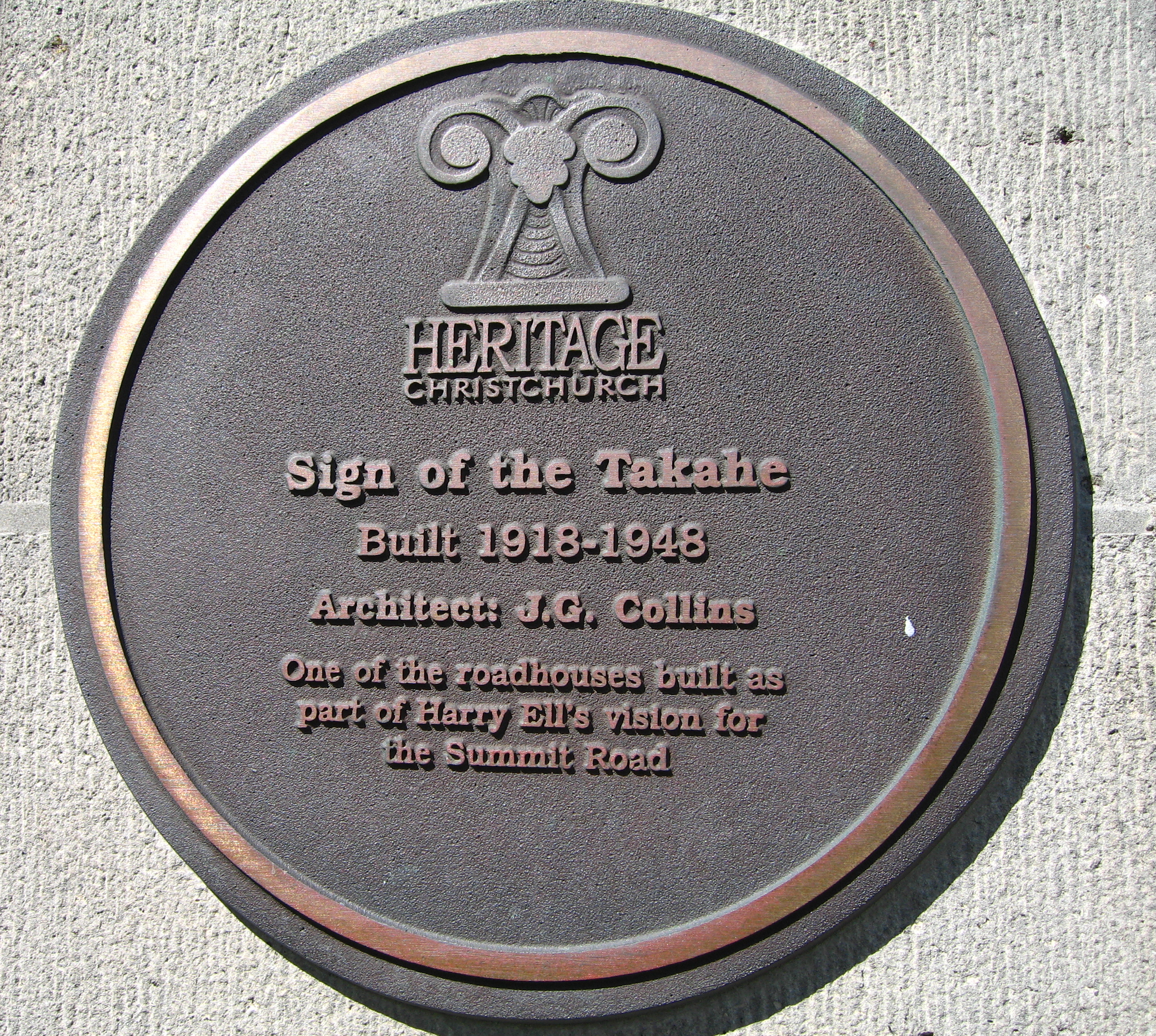
Plaque at the Sign of the Takahe

The Sign of the Takahe is a neo-Gothic style historic building in Christchurch, New Zealand. It is currently leased from Christchurch City Council and run as a wedding and function venue.

== History ==
Construction began on the building in 1918, spearheaded by Christchurch City councillor and New Zealand Member of Parliament, Henry George (Harry) Ell. Ell envisioned the building as the Gateway into the Port Hills and the Summit Road, one of four planned rest houses in the area for those walking the reserves of Port Hills that overlook Christchurch and Lyttelton harbour. The other rest houses are Sign of the Kiwi, Sign of the Bellbird, and Sign of the Packhorse.

While part of the building opened to the public as the Tram Terminus Rest House in 1920, which featured a tram terminus and tearoom, it would take decades for construction of the Sign of the Takahe to be completed.

Ell died suddenly in June 1934, having never seen the building fully completed. Construction of the building continued under the direction of architect J. G. Collins. The Christchurch City Council bought the building in 1942 and it was finally completed in 1948, opening to the public in 1949.

Like many structures in the area, the building was damaged in the February 2011 Canterbury earthquake. A NZ$2.8 million council restoration was completed prior to the building's centennial in May 2017. It reopened in 2019.

== Notable features ==
The building is named after the endemic New Zealand flightless bird, the Takahē.

During the Great Depression, a great deal of improvisation was required to minimise cost. For example, the stone was quarried locally and hand chiseled into blocks using primitive tools, the heavy kauri beams in the entrance hall were salvaged from a former bridge over the Hurunui River. The ceilings in the inner-most dining room were painted on timber cut from packing cases.

The building's dining room fireplace is an exact replica of the historic Haddon Hall in Derbyshire.

The building has a Category I listing with Heritage New Zealand. It is located adjacent to Cracroft Reserve.

== See also ==
- Sign of the Kiwi
- Sign of the Bellbird
