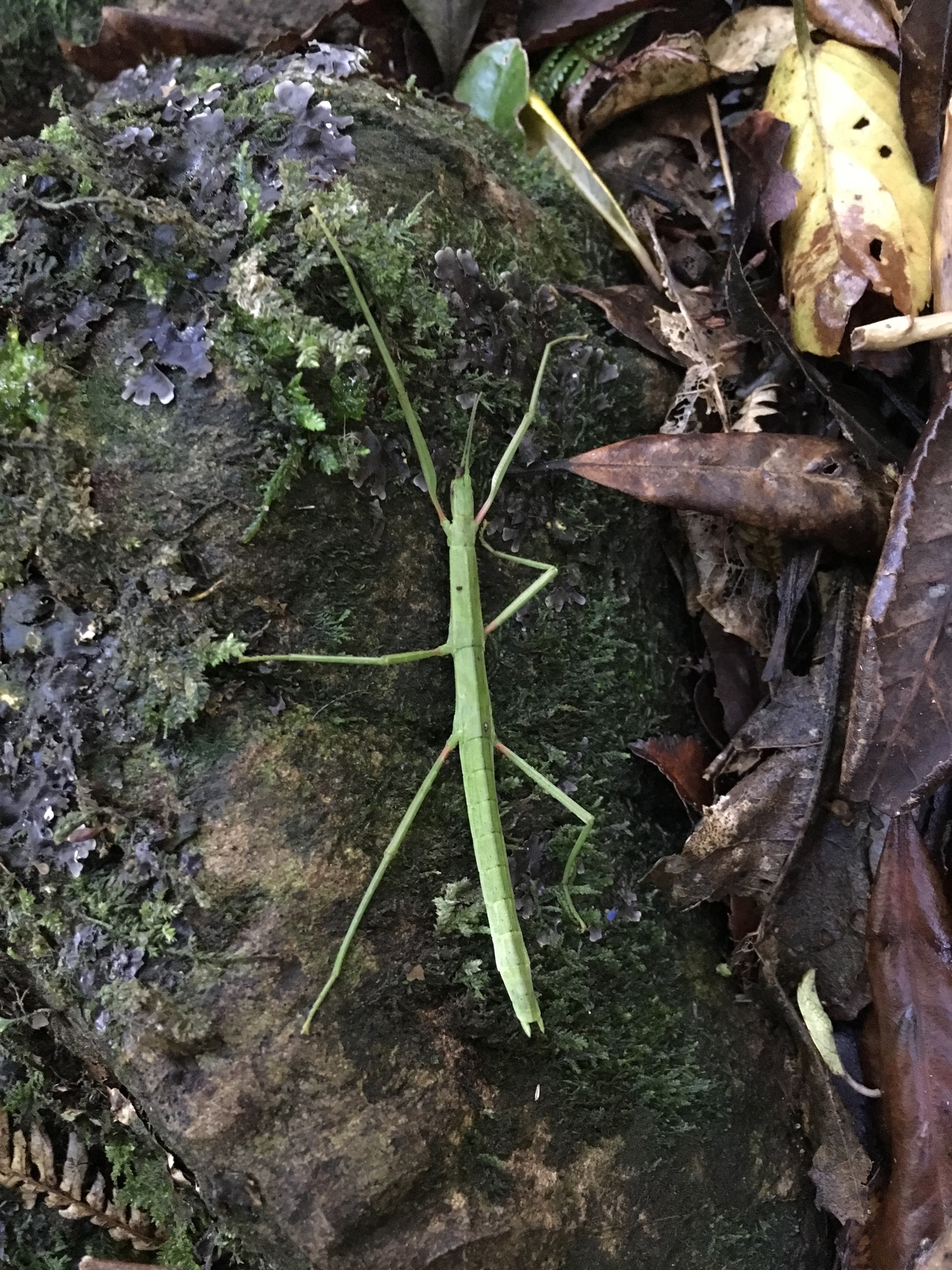

Scientific classification
- Kingdom: Animalia
- Phylum: Arthropoda
- Class: Insecta
- Order: Phasmatodea
- Family: Phasmatidae
- Genus: Tectarchus
- Species: T. huttoni

Binomial name
- Tectarchus huttoni (Brunner von Wattenwyl, 1907)

Synonyms
- Pachymorpha finitima; Pachymorpha huttoni; Tectarchus diversus

= Tectarchus huttoni =

Species of insect

Tectarchus huttoni is a species of stick insect in the family Phasmatidae. It is endemic to New Zealand and known as the ridge-backed stick insect.

== Taxonomy ==
Tectarchus huttoni is an insect of the order Phasmatodea. The first name of this species was Pachymorpha huttoni created by Brunner von Wattenwyl in 1907. The genus and species Tectarchus diversus was created by Salmon in 1954. The other synonym of this species is Pachymorpha finitima.

== Description ==
Tectarchus huttoni are usually green in color, although light brown forms are also common. Adult females (50– 60 mm) are larger than males. The egg is 3.5 mm long, bilobed at the posterior with a rugged and punctate capsule. It has a smooth keel, a small micropylar plate, and a flat-topped cylindrical capitulum. These species can be found on Astelia epiphytes, rātā, ferns and Coprosma. They appear to live and forage naturally in the leaves of these plants.

== Distribution ==
This species is common in forests of North Island New Zealand: The following is a list of locations where the species has been recorded:

-Lake Waikaremoana; Urewera; Nelson; Upper Maitai; Banks Peninsula; Picton; Kennedy's Bush; Mt Te Aroha; Balloon Saddle; Huiarau Ranges; Hutt Valley; Wairarapa; Akatarawa Saddle; Mt Ross, Wairarapa, Orongorongo Valley, Tararua Ranges, Siverstream, Karori, South karori, Miramar, Wilton Bush and Days Bay, Johnston's Hill in Wellington.
