= Cranmer Court =

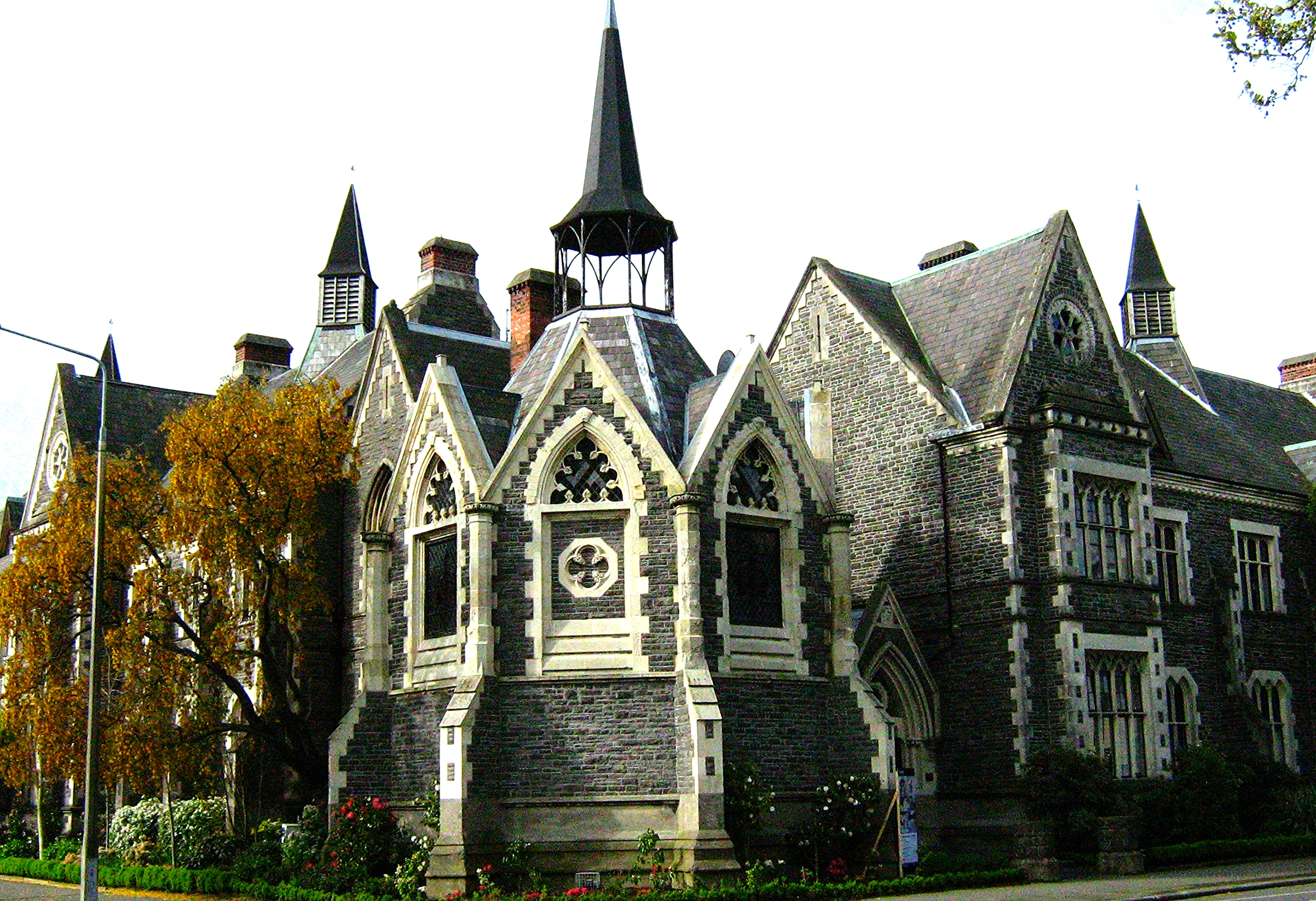
- Cranmer Court in 2007

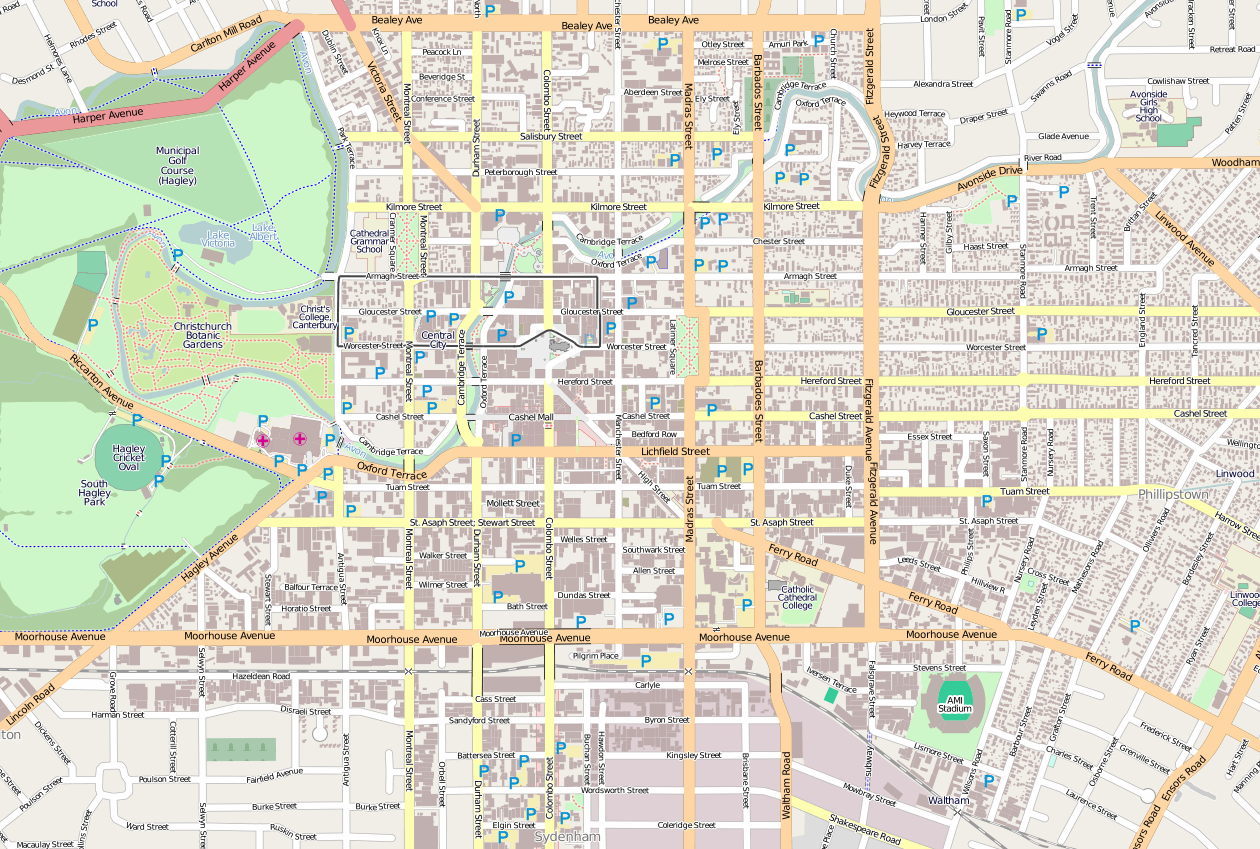
- Location within Christchurch
- Former names: Christchurch Normal School

General information
- Type: Education building
- Architectural style: Gothic Revival
- Location: corner Kilmore and Montreal Streets, 350 Montreal Street, Christchurch, New Zealand
- Coordinates: 43°31′35″S 172°37′51″E
- Completed: 1876
- Inaugurated: April 1876
- Demolished: October 2012
- Client: Canterbury Education Board

Design and construction
- Architect: Samuel Farr
- Main contractor: Daniel Reese

Renovating team
- Architect: Thomas Cane (1878)

Heritage New Zealand – Category 1
- Designated: 21 March 1991
- Reference no.: 1872

References
- "Cranmer Court (Former Normal School)". New Zealand Heritage List/Rārangi Kōrero. Heritage New Zealand.

Cranmer Court, the former Christchurch Normal School, was one of the most significant heritage buildings in Christchurch, New Zealand. Its demolition, due to some damage in the 2011 Christchurch earthquake, was controversial.

== History ==
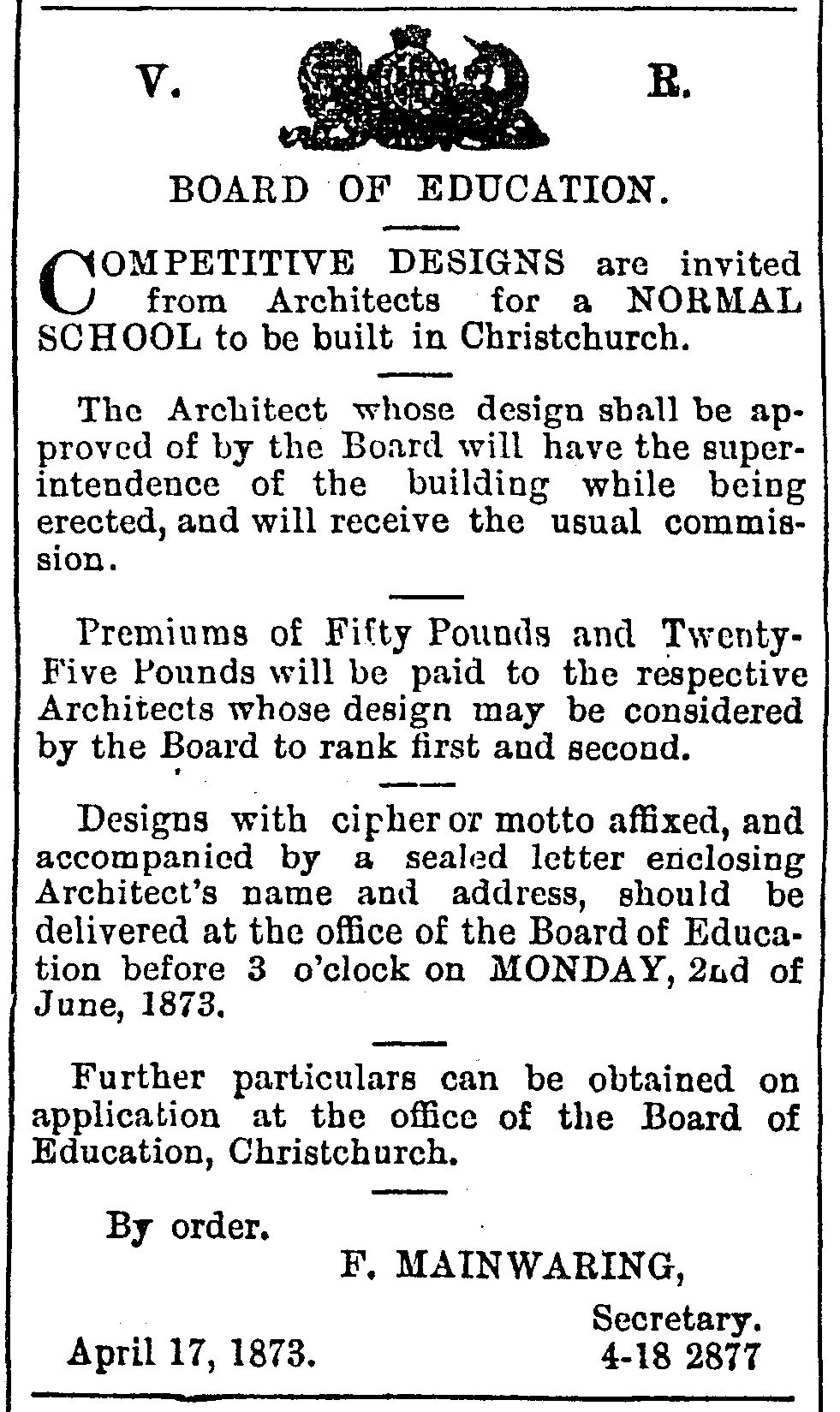
Announcing the architectural competition for Christchurch Normal School

The Canterbury Board of Education held an architectural competition in 1873 for the design of the Christchurch Normal School. At the time, education was still the responsibility of provincial government. The competition was announced in The Press by advertisement on 18 April of that year, rewarding the two best entries with £50 and £25, respectively. The board received 12 entries, with Christchurch architect Samuel Farr winning the competition, and Dunedin-based Robert Lawson coming second.

Construction began later in 1873, with Sir Charles Fergusson, the Governor of New Zealand, laying the foundation stone. The builder was Daniel Reese, who completed construction after three years. The school was opened on 3 April 1876 and was one of New Zealand's first normal schools (with the Dunedin school opened earlier that year).

In 1930, the Teachers' College Building was built diagonally opposite the Normal School as accommodation for trainee teachers. That building is also registered, as Category II, with the Historic Places Trust.

When the building was vacated in 1970, an argument about its future raged for more than a decade. Eventually, the building was purchased by a local entrepreneur, Chris Berryman, whose company gutted and built apartments inside the empty shell. It also housed Grimsby's Restaurant.

On 21 March 1991, the building was registered by the New Zealand Historic Places Trust as a Category I historic place, with the registration number 1872.

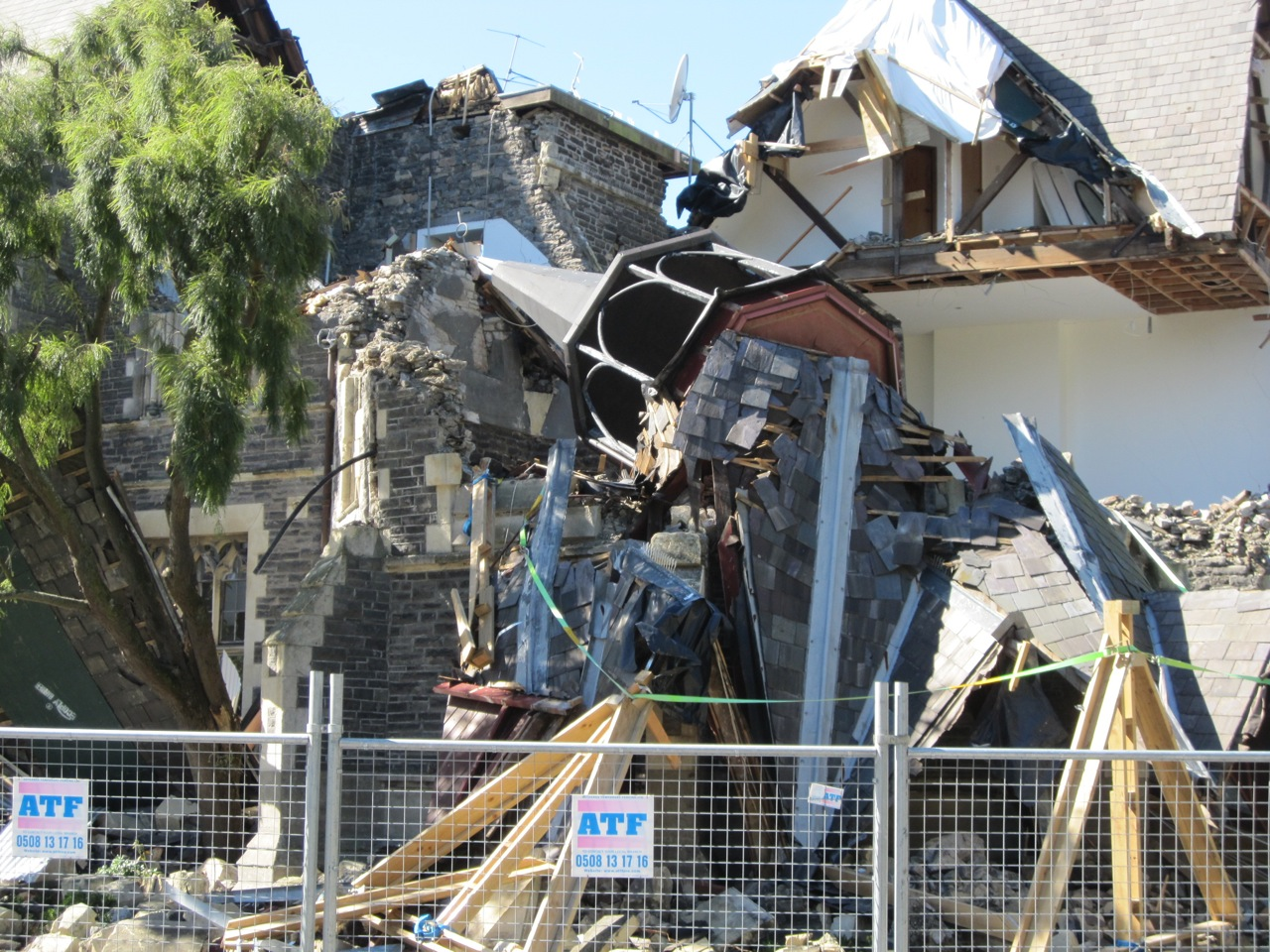
Grimsby's Restaurant after the 2011 earthquake.

Cranmer Court was damaged during the 2010 and 2011 Christchurch earthquakes, and subsequently red-stickered. Though Cranmer Court is one of Christchurch's three last remaining 19th century public school buildings (the other two are the original buildings of Christchurch Boys' High School and Christchurch Girls' High School, which are now both part of the Arts Centre), demolition was carried out during October 2012; demolition was reported as complete on 2 November. A city council vote to pause the demolishing did not bring pause to the work. The demolition did not include nine modern town houses that are also part of Cranmer Court, which are located along Peterborough Street.

The local newspaper, The Press, was critical of the demolition and lamented in an editorial the fact that heritage buildings have been neglected by central government, making particular reference to the Earthquake Recovery minister, Gerry Brownlee, and the Canterbury Earthquake Recovery Authority. The editorial made reference to Brownlee's comment made shortly after the February 2011 earthquake about heritage buildings that "old dungas" had to be demolished.

This has come about because the new masters of the Christchurch universe have devalued heritage in the spirit of Gerry Brownlee's old-dungers philosophy.

— The Press editorial

Despite the land being zoned L4c, which is high-density residential and excludes use by churches, the site was sold to the Majestic Church for NZ$10m. The site was sold on behalf of its 31 owners through a public tender process.

== Naming ==
The Normal School was so named because it provided a 'normal' school environment where trainee teachers could observe more senior teachers interacting with pupils in the classroom. When a developer bought the complex in 1981, he gave it the new name of Cranmer Court after the adjacent Cranmer Square, which in turn is named after the martyr Thomas Cranmer.

== Heritage value ==
The Town Planning Division of Christchurch City Council decided in the mid 1980s to identify and describe "the city's most valuable historic buildings, in the hope that greater public awareness of their importance will contribute to their chances of survival". A series of ten booklets with the title 'The Architectural Heritage of Christchurch' was produced; the one covering the Normal School was the first in this set. On 21 March 1991, the building was registered by the New Zealand Historic Places Trust as a Category I historic place, with the registration number 1872.

== Architecture ==
Samuel Farr's building was in an L-shape, with the frontages onto Kilmore (south frontage) and Montreal (west frontage) Streets measuring 244 feet (74 m) and 145 feet (44 m), respectively. Whilst the external appearance of the school was highly ornamented, the inside was plain and austere. The exception to this was the octagonal corner room where Kilmore and Montreal Streets meet, with the roof of this room intricately vaulted. It was Farr's most famous building, and maybe his most scholarly Gothic design.

An extension to the north, in keeping with Farr's work but generally of simpler execution, was designed by architect Thomas Cane in 1878 to accommodate a kindergarten.

== Notable people ==
=== Notable pupils ===
- Frank O'Flynn (1918–2003), Queen's Counsel and Member of Parliament for the Labour Party
- Henry James Nicholas (1891–1918), recipient of the Victoria Cross
- William Orange (1889–1966), Anglican clergyman and leader of the Evangelical movement

=== Notable staff ===
- Kate Andersen (1870–1957), New Zealand teacher, community leader and writer (also a pupil at this school)
- Jean Emily Hay (1903–1984), teacher, broadcaster and early childhood educator
- Christina Henderson (1861–1953), teacher, feminist, prohibitionist, social reformer and editor
- Elizabeth Taylor (1868–1941), temperance worker, community leader and social reformer
