= Christchurch tramway system =

Tram transport network of Christchurch, New Zealand

Coordinates: 43°31′51.30″S 172°38′4″E

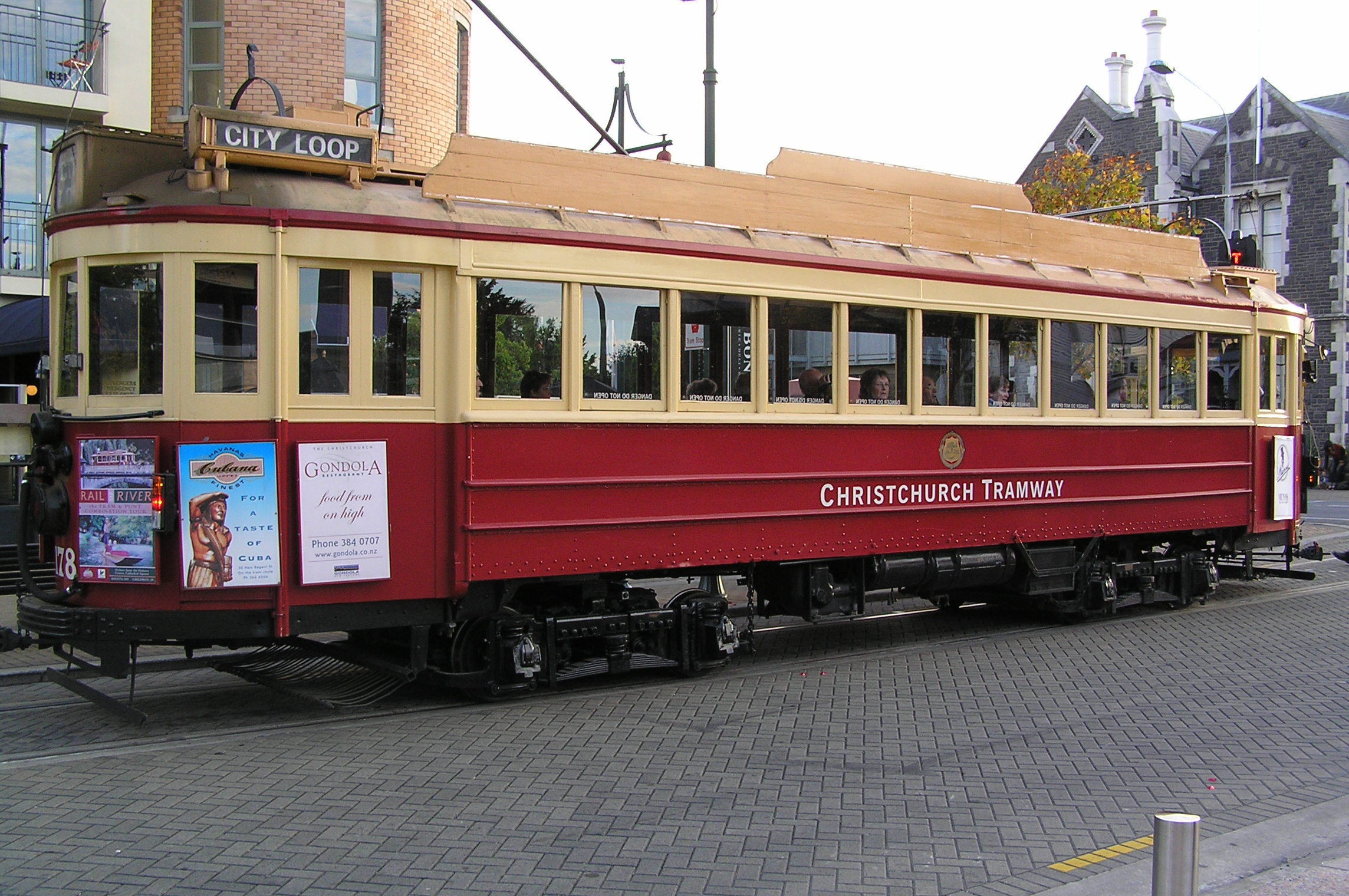
- A Christchurch Tramway tram, Worcester Street (March 2005)

Operation
- Locale: Christchurch, New Zealand
- Open: 4 February 1995

Infrastructure
- Track gauge: 1,435 mm (4 ft 8 1/2 in) standard gauge

Statistics
Private era: 1880–1906
- Status: Closed
- Routes: Papanui; Cashmere; Sumner; Brighton (via Linwood); Brighton (via North Beach); Lincoln Road; Railway Station
- Owners: Canterbury Tramway Company; Christchurch City Council; New Brighton Tramway Company; City and Suburban Tramway Company; Christchurch Tramway Company
- Operators: Canterbury Tramway Company; Christchurch City Council; New Brighton Tramway Company; City and Suburban Tramway Company; Christchurch Tramway Company
- Propulsion systems: Horse, steam
- Depots: Cathedral Square (C.T.C.); Oxford Terrace (City Council)
- Route length: 21 miles 67 chains (35.1 km)
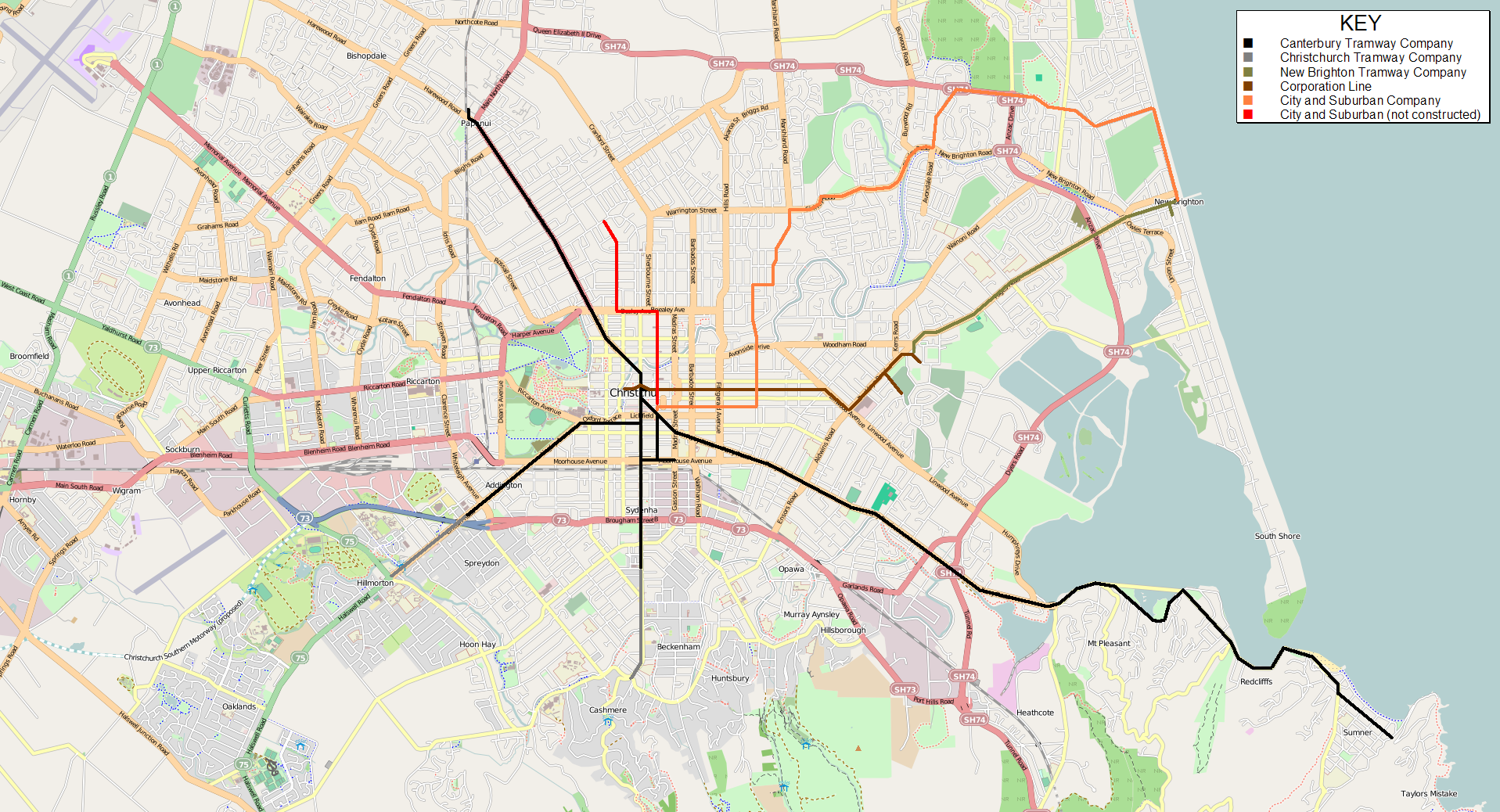
CTB era: 1905–1954
- Status: Closed
- Routes: (1) Papanui (2) Cashmere (3) Sumner (4) Cranford Street (5) Brighton (6) Worcester Street (7) Lincoln Road (8) Riccarton (9) Fendalton (10) North Beach (12) St. Martins (13) Opawa (14) Spreydon (15) Railway (16) St. Albans Park
- Owner: Christchurch Tramway Board
- Operator: Christchurch Tramway Board
- Propulsion systems: Electric, steam (minimal)
- Electrification: 600 V DC catenary
- Depot: Falsgrave Street
- Track length (total): 63.25 mi (101.79 km) (1914)
- Route length: 53.5 mi (86.1 km) (1914)
- 1920–1921: 24,592,998
- 1940–1941: 22,710,855
- 1950–1951: 27,265,157
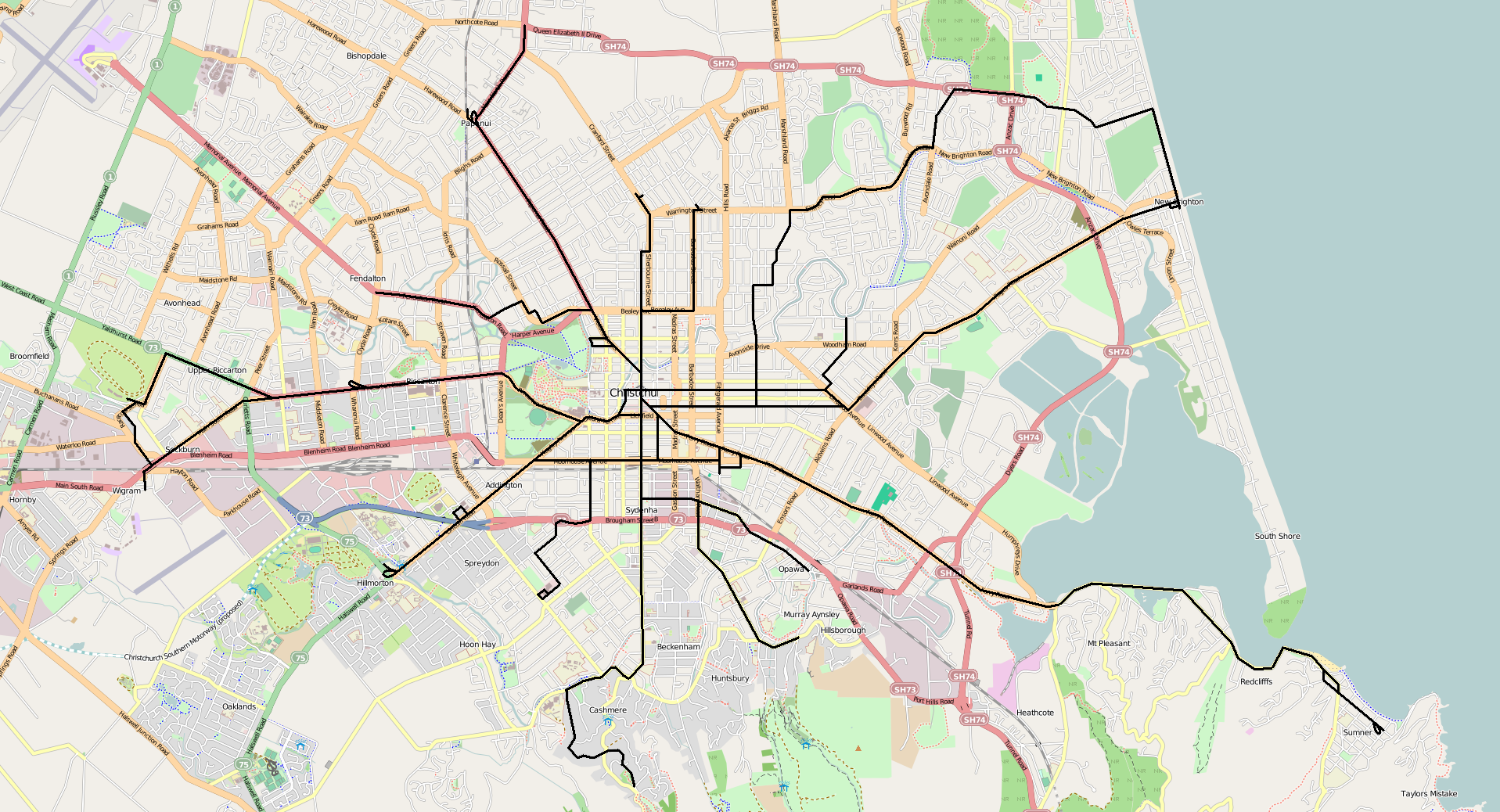
Preservation era: 1968–present
- Status: Operational
- Routes: Ferrymead Heritage Park
- Owner: Tramway Historical Society
- Operator: Tramway Historical Society
- Propulsion systems: Horse, steam, electric
- Electrification: 600 V DC catenary
- Route length: 1.5 km (0.93 mi)
- Website: https://www.christchurchattractions.nz/christchurch-tram/
Heritage era: 1995–present
- Status: Open (building circuits over time)
- Routes: Central city heritage circuit
- Owner: Wood Scenic Line Ltd.
- Operator: Christchurch Tramway Ltd.
- Propulsion system: Electric
- Electrification: 600 V DC catenary
- Route length: 3.9 km (2.4 mi)
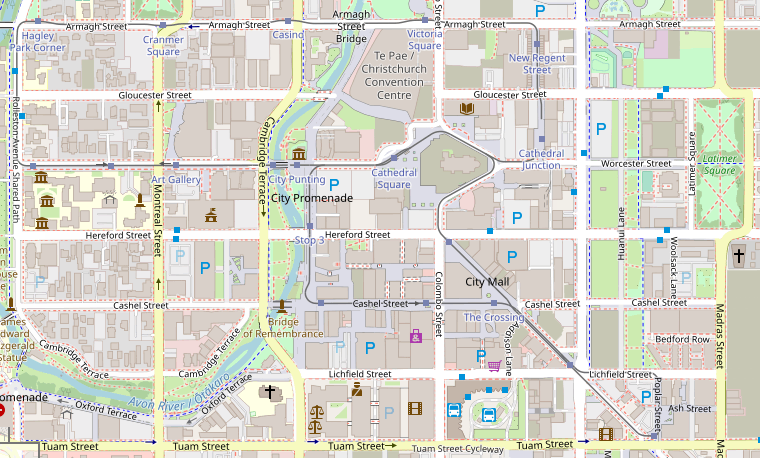
- Website: http://www.tram.co.nz/ www.tram.co.nz https://www.christchurchattractions.nz/christchurch-tram/

The Christchurch tramway system is a small tramway network serving the inner city of Christchurch, New Zealand. Historically, it was an extensive network, with steam and horse trams from 1882 and then electric trams ran from 1905 to 1954, when the last line from Cashmere to Papanui was replaced by buses. In 1995, a 2.5-kilometre (1.6 mi) central city loop heritage tram was reopened in the central city as a tourist attraction. This has now been extended with a 1.4-kilometre (0.87 mi) loop down to High Street which was opened in February 2015.

The tram museum at the Ferrymead Heritage Park overhauls and restores the trams used on the Christchurch Tramway, and itself also runs operating trams on its site.

== History ==
=== Background ===
The difficulty experienced by Christchurch's early residents in conveying them and their export goods to Lyttelton brought about the first proposal for a tramway at a meeting held on 26 September 1855. The merits of both wooden and iron-based tramways were discussed and a resolution was passed in support of the construction of either a tramway or a railway.

The issue arose again at a Provincial Council meeting on 16 October 1855 at which it was proposed that a line be built to Sumner and goods could then be transported to Lyttelton by boat. A couple of leading and influential figures spoke out against the proposal and it was voted down.

It was not until 1858 that the matter once again gained attention in official circles. Despite a general belief that the idea itself was good, the Provincial Engineer's estimate of £6,000 was enough to ensure that the idea was not acted upon. The provincial council eventually opted to construct a railway line; the first section between Christchurch and Ferrymead opened in 1863, and the Ferrymead to Lyttelton section opened in 1867.

A meeting of prominent local citizens on 20 September 1872 discussed the matter of a tramway and concluded that it would be desirable to construct a line between Papanui and Christchurch railway stations, especially in light of the north railway having opened to Rangiora earlier that year. Estimates had been prepared and it was suggested that the company be called "The Christchurch and Papanui Junction Tramway Company". The city council, however, was opposed to the idea and declined to support it, saying, "That in the opinion of this meeting a tramway … is objectionable … for the following reasons: (1) A tramway is not required, (2) The streets are not wide enough, (3) A tramway would retard the railway station being brought into a more convenient place for the citizens".

=== White's Little River tramway: 1861–1872 ===
A partnership was formed in 1861, including well-known bridge engineer William White, with the aim of constructing a wooden tramway from Christchurch to Little River. The goal was to make it cheaper to cart timber from Little River and other building materials from the Halswell Quarry to Christchurch. The plan was for a line of approximately 38 miles (61 km) in length, starting in what is now Moorhouse Avenue, travelling to Birdlings Flat where it would roughly follow the present state highway to Little River, then on to an area now known as Puaha. The gauge was to be 4 ft (1,219 mm) and the estimated cost was £1,023 per mile.

White began construction in 1863 and by year's end had built 1-mile (1.6 km) of the line. The project ultimately failed, due largely to a lack of capital, but animosity from the line's neighbours also disrupted business. Work on the line had ceased by the end of 1866 by which time the Christchurch–Halswell Quarry section had been completed and work had started at the Little River end. The line to the quarry remained in use until 1872. Little River was eventually served by rail when the Railways Department's Little River Branch opened to its namesake terminus in 1886.

=== Horse and steam era: 1880–1906 ===
The idea of building a tramway did not gain widespread support until 1876. By this time, the city had experienced significant development and the need for improved transport had become evident. With the passing into law of the Tramways Act in 1872 and the city council dropping its opposition to the idea, the political environment had become more agreeable to the formation of tramways.

Trams became a reality for Christchurch on 9 March 1880 when the first revenue services commenced on a line from Cathedral Square to Christchurch Railway Station via Colombo Street. The company behind the venture, the Canterbury Tramway Company, had been formed in 1878 then spent the next two years negotiating with the various councils involved, purchasing equipment, constructing its lines, etc. After the first day, issues with the track were identified which resulted in a suspension of services until 16 March.

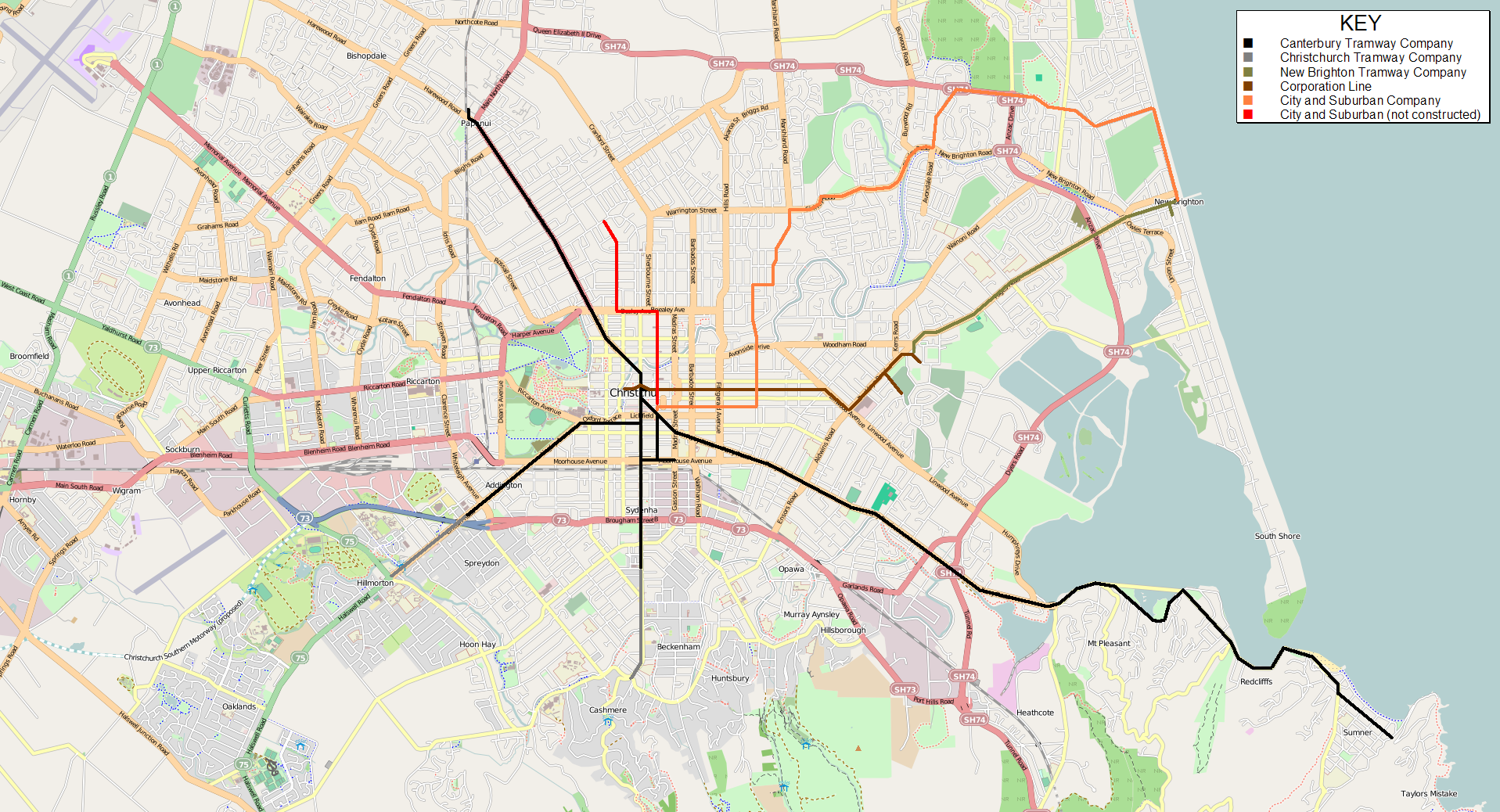
Route map of private tramway company lines in Christchurch

The Company opened several other lines that same year including: Christchurch Railway Station via High and Manchester Streets (24 July); Papanui Railway Station (24 June); Agricultural Show Grounds (6 August) and later in the year to Devon Street. Orders were also placed with local coachbuilders for more tramcars.

In later years, other lines opened by the Company included: Addington Railway Station (5 January 1882) and later the Addington Show Grounds (28 October 1887); Woolston (7 July 1882) then to Heathcote (9 December 1882) and finally Sumner (1 November 1888). The lines to Papanui and Sumner were the most lucrative.

It was not until 1884 that another player joined the Canterbury Tramway Company in the tramway business. The city council decided that it needed its own line from the central city to serve its cemetery and Reserve. It intended to run the municipal services on the line itself and to contract out the carriage of people. Construction began on 26 November 1885 at Latimer Square and was completed by March 1886. The line was officially opened on 23 April 1886 and was to have passenger services provided by private contractor Charles O'Malley who had earlier secured a three-year lease. He proved to be unsuitable and was replaced in August 1886 by the Canterbury Tramway Company. The lease changed hands again after 18 months and was picked up by the New Brighton Tramway Company who remained the leaseholder until municipalisation.

Buoyed by the prospect of a tram connection to New Brighton following the opening of the city council's Corporation line, the New Brighton Tramway Company was formed in 1885 with the intention of constructing and operating a line from a junction with the Corporation line to a terminus at New Brighton. Construction began in 1886 and was completed by January 1887. The first service on the line was a trial run on 8 January 1887, which proved to be a success, and was followed on 15 February by the commencement of revenue services. The Company's acquisition of the lease for the Corporation line at the end of 1888 proved to be fortuitous, giving the Company control over the entire route from the central city to the New Brighton terminus.

The last entrant to the Christchurch tramway scene was the City and Suburban Tramway Company, formed early in 1892 with the intention of constructing lines to Springfield Road and New Brighton from its base at the corner of Manchester, Lichfield, and High Streets. Only the latter of these lines was built, on which construction began on 1 May 1893. The Company ran into financial difficulties during construction that held up progress until the contractor secured a debt over the Company and completed the line in August 1894. Revenue services commenced as far as Stanmore Road on 1 September 1893 and it was not until 25 October 1894 that trams were able to run the full length of the line to New Brighton Pier. A deleterious financial position, brought about in part by the Company's need to rent both horses and rolling stock, resulted in the collapse of the Company in 1895. It was purchased by the contractor who built the Company's line and run under the same name.

The Canterbury Tramway Company had earlier had its own financial difficulties resulting in its collapse in 1893. After various options were explored the Company was recapitalised as the Christchurch Tramway Company. Various measures were implemented to remedy the issues that plagued the old company including the closure of the Manchester Street route to the railway station, the use of horses in preference to steam motors, and the renewal or replacement of some of its assets. During its time, the Company also extended two of its lines: the Addington line reached Sunnyside Asylum at the end of 1895 with revenue services commencing in the New Year, and the Sydenham line was extended to the Cashmere Hills and opened on 7 December 1898.

When the concessions under which the lines of the private tramway companies were operated came up for renewal from the late 1890s, the various local bodies involved saw it as an opportunity to consider municipalisation of the whole system. The tramway companies, which were seeking to extend their concessions to give them some certainty over the future of their business, were rebuffed and eventually the Christchurch Tramway Board was formed to bring the tramways under public control.

=== Electric era: 1905–1954 ===
==== Early years ====
Political pressure and public agitation for a modern tramway system resulted in the formation of the Christchurch Tramway Board in late 1902. It proceeded to create its own network by purchasing the lines of the private tramway companies and also establishing its own new lines.

Work on the Tramway Board's lines began in September 1904 at the intersection of Fitzgerald Avenue and Ferry Road. It required a great many men using only basic tools with the assistance of horse-drawn drays and traction engines and attracted considerable interest from the public.

Installation of tramlines sometimes led to improvements of the roads on which they were built. Because as was standard practice at the time, single-track tram lines were laid in the middle of the road requiring some roads to be widened to allow vehicles to pass trams on either side. Also, any undulations in the road were smoothed out so the track could be laid flush with the road surface.

Private operators were contracted by the board to provide alternative transport while tramlines were unavailable due to construction. These services were run using horse-drawn drags.

The electrified tram network was inaugurated on 5 June 1905 when an official opening day was held. After speeches at the board's car shed on Falsgrave Street, the official party departed on a procession of seven electric trams bound for Papanui. After an accident en route required the withdrawal of two of the trams, the rest of the party reached their destination where the festivities continued. Revenue services commenced on the Papanui–Railway Station route the following day.

The first tranche of work was completed by September 1906. Figures provided by The Press in June 1906 show that materials used included 2,400 poles, 63 miles (101 km) of trolley wire, 65 miles (105 km) of feeder cables, 120 miles (190 km) of telephone and other wires, 80,000 sleepers, 26,000 electrical bonds, 90,000 yards of metal, and 5,500 tons of rails.

Lines built and electrified by the New Zealand Electrical Construction Company were mainly those that had been acquired from the private tramway companies and included: Papanui to Christchurch Railway Station (6 June 1905); Sumner (steam, 6 June 1905; electric, 25 April 1907); Cashmere (16 August 1905); Riccarton (steam, 2 November 1905; electric, 12 March 1906); Lincoln Road (8 February 1906); New Brighton (Linwood, 26 March 1906; New Brighton, 6 August 1906).

==== Heyday ====
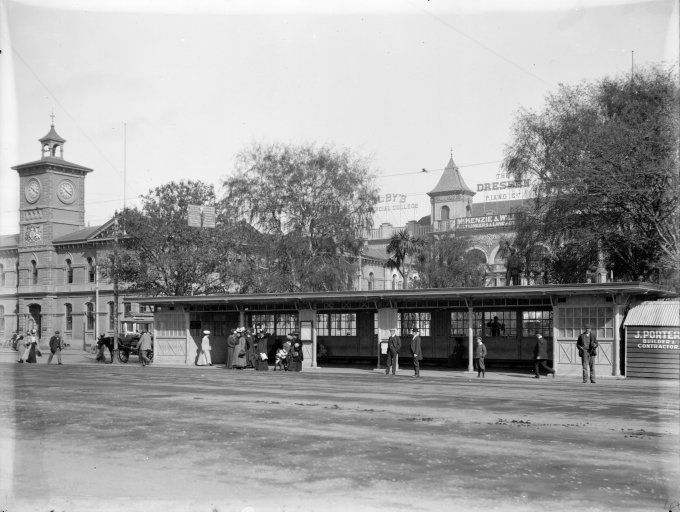
Tram shelter in Cathedral Square, circa 1905

The trams quickly became popular with the public and revenue exceeded the board's expectations. Rolling stock consisted of 27 electric vehicles supplied under the initial contract and the 7 steam motors and 42 trailers acquired from the Christchurch Tramway Company. Twenty-two trailers from the New Brighton and City and Suburban tramway companies later augmented the fleet.

Though the primary purpose of the tramway was the carriage of passengers, it also carried other items such as mail, newspapers, prams, bicycles, construction materials, and animals. The cartage of animals on the tramway was made illegal in December 1915.

The reality of the environment in which the tramway business was conducted was made clear in 1912 when chairman of the board George Booth explained the main problems the board faced in his annual report. First, Christchurch had a considerable amount of route mileage with little or no revenue potential, necessitated by the geographically diverse nature of the population it served. Second, the growing problem of competition from bicycles and motorcars since the development of the pneumatic tyre, exacerbated by the generally flat nature of the terrain on which Christchurch was sited. The board's response to these issues had not improved the situation by 1914.

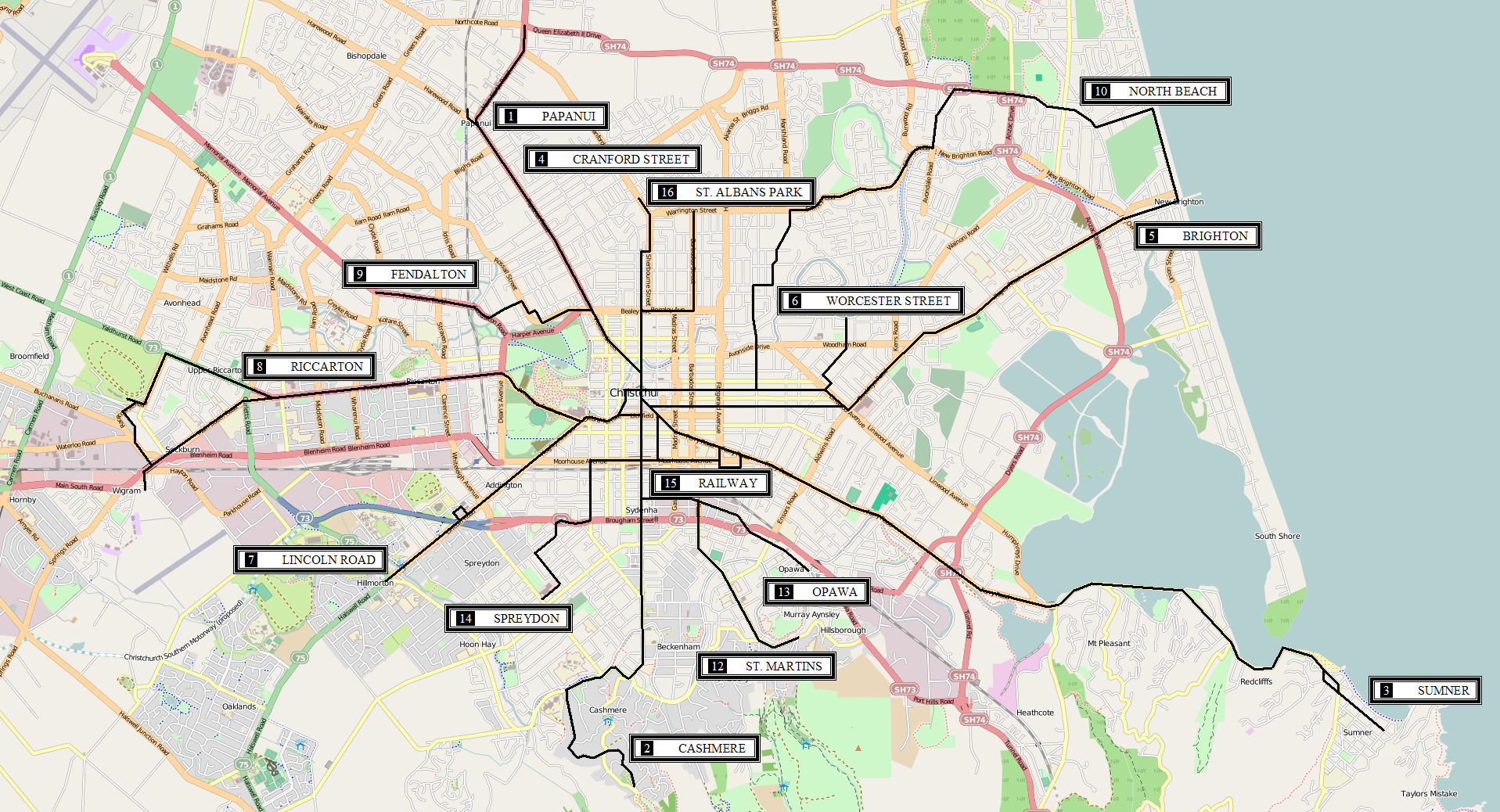
Route map of Christchurch's electrified tramway network at its peak

It was during this period that the construction of the tramway network was completed. Additional lines opened were St. Albans Park (24 December 1906), Opawa (steam, 14 March 1907; electric, 21 September 1909), Fendalton (steam, 3 May 1907; electric, 20 November 1909), Cranford Street (1 July 1910), North Beach (steam, 24 December 1911; electric, 1 October 1914), Spreydon (3 August 1911), Cashmere Hills extension (1 May 1912), Dallington (1 November 1912), Northcote extension (28 February 1913), and the St. Martins line (7 April 1914) which was the last major line to be opened. The only new tracks to be commissioned after this time (aside from single- or double-tracking and renewals) were the extension of the Riccarton line to Plumpton Park (December 1915), the Lichfield Street link (July 1922), and the extension of the Spreydon line to Barrington Street (August 1922). For many years afterwards Christchurch was able to boast the largest network in the country by route mileage at 53.5 miles (86.1 km) and in 1912 it was reportedly second only to Sydney in Australasia.

The growth of the board's business in its early years soon necessitated the purchase of new rolling stock to meet demand. By 1908, the number of electric trams had increased to 39 and had grown to 65 in 1912. An additional 34 trailers were also added to the fleet by 1920. Other vehicles acquired included a Baldwin steam motor (1906), three sprinkler cars, and an overhead lines car. To match this, the size of the board's staff also grew from 196 in 1906 to 350 in 1913 and 530 in 1920, making it the largest employer in the city.

The tramway was credited with encouraging the suburban development of Christchurch. Land along tram routes became more valuable and made it easier for people to live out in the suburbs. The main central city retail precinct, which had been concentrated around the railway station, gradually moved north to avail itself of the increased flow of people generated by the tram routes converging on Cathedral Square. Smaller retail precincts developed around the ends of some lines such as Fendalton and Spreydon.

==== Halcyon years ====
The economic uncertainty of the late 1920s culminated in the Great Depression of the 1930s, a situation that severely affected the operation of the tramway as much as it affected the rest of the country. Both revenue and patronage suffered sharp declines and as if to make matters worse the loans used to establish the tramway system were due to mature in 1934. Competition was becoming an increasing problem, particularly from bicycles whose number had increased dramatically.

To contain its financial problems, the board implemented several economy measures. It experimented with the St. Martins cars to trial "one-man" tram operation, which proved that the concept could work. Between 1932 and 1936, additional trams were converted for this purpose and deployed initially on the more lightly patronised lines before being used on the longer lines as a sufficient number were available. Consequent to the introduction of one-man trams was the need to install balloon loops or wyes at the termini of the lines on which these cars were used.

Several under-performing or severely dilapidated lines were also closed during this period, notably the North Beach line, the Papanui railway station spur and Northcote extension of the Papanui line, and the Dallington–Railway Station route. In most cases, trams on these routes were replaced with buses.

With the arrival of World War II came constraints on many aspects of ordinary life that were both beneficial and detrimental to the tramway. Restrictions and rationing of many basic supplies limited the use of private motorised transport leading to huge growth in patronage of the trams and, often, severe overcrowding. This also had the effect of significantly improving the board's revenue. The increased popularity of the trams was also assisted by the large number of New Zealand military personnel based at both the Burnham Camp and Wigram Aerodrome, and the contingent of American military in the city.

It was not all good news for the board during the war years, as its costs also increased during this period; primarily wages, electricity, and maintenance. The war also made it more difficult to obtain supplies and spare parts needed to maintain and repair its assets, requiring a measure of ingenuity to keep things working. War service depleted the board's staff resulting in the hiring of women where necessary to fill gaps. Women were not just to fill gaps – wartime photo shows 28 women conductors at the time. Most trams then carried women conductors. RNM

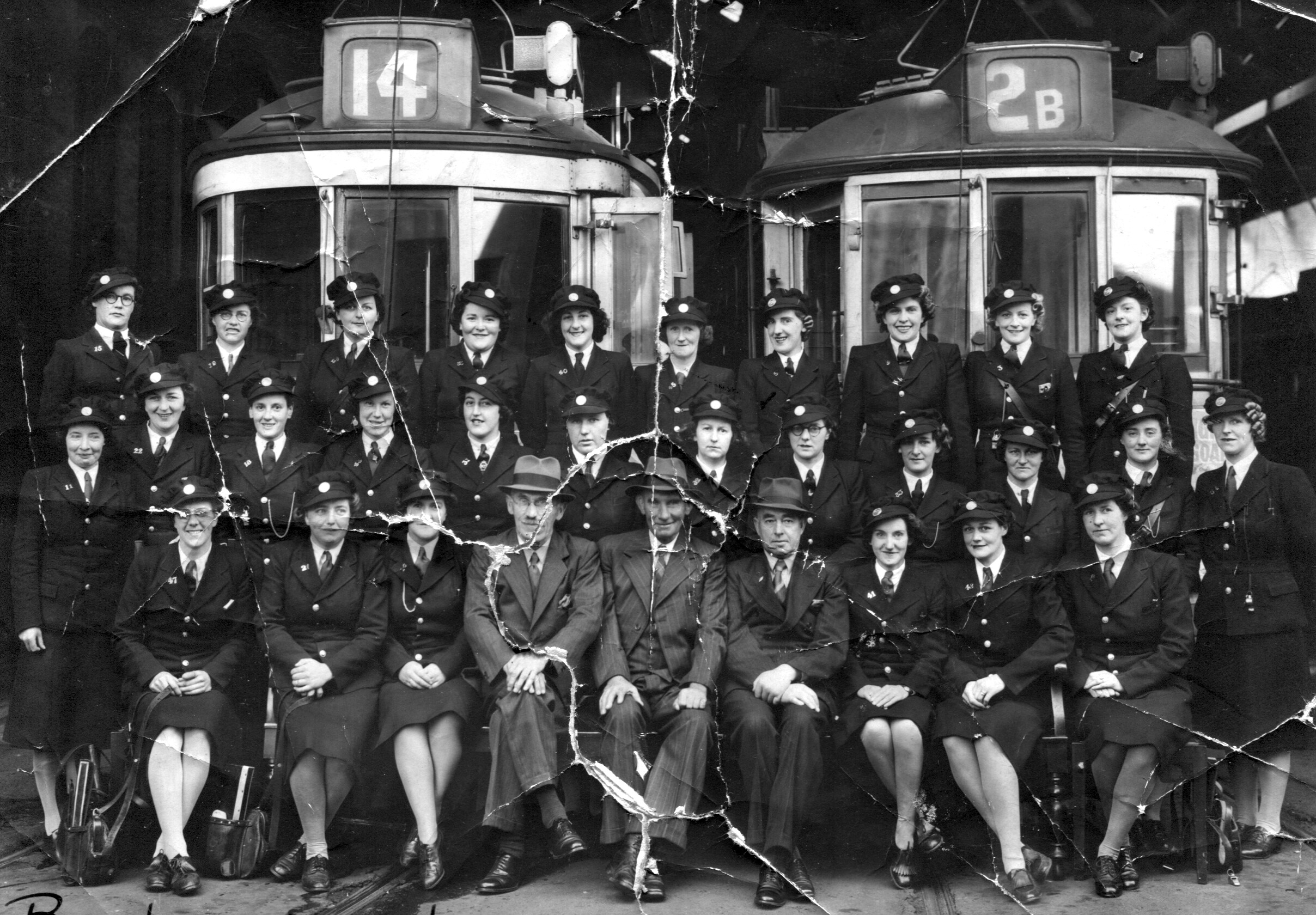
Photo taken circa 1942

The end of the war also brought about the end of the boom for the tramway and marked the beginning of the end. Unlike other tramway systems around the country, the newest of vehicles in service in Christchurch were decades old and the track had suffered from years of neglect with little maintenance having been carried out. Though the imposition of rationing was not finally lifted until the early 1950s, post-war Christchurch grew faster than the tramway could keep up ensuring that the tramway's replacement was just a matter of time.

==== Demise ====
Although several lines were closed and replaced by buses in the 1930s due to prevailing economic conditions, most tram routes were closed in the decade following the end of World War 2. While the war was in some respects a boon for the tramway – with restrictions on other forms of transport patronage of the trams was significantly improved – it also caused problems, which contributed to the end of the trams.

Perhaps one of the biggest problems faced by the tramway system following the war was the much-improved economic situation that ensued, increasing prosperity for many and giving them options that they might not have had before. Rates of car ownership increased and the city grew significantly in size presenting the board with a twofold problem of trying to maintain what they already had whilst trying to serve many more people over a greater area. Operating costs also increased, due in part to changing work patterns that placed a higher demand on the trams during peak times and reduced off-peak demand, but also an increase in staff costs, which only served to further increase losses.

To determine the future of public transport in Christchurch, the Future Policy Committee was formed in February 1945. It considered the matter of the tram network and concluded that the remaining tram routes should be retained and operated until such time as the tracks reached the end of their useful lives at which time they would be replaced by buses. John Fardell, appointed general manager of the board in 1946, delivered his own report on the future direction of the board on 6 October 1947. He pointed out the poor state of the board's tramway assets and that even with repairs, new infrastructure and rolling stock would be required within a few years to keep the system operational. The board was also at the time in a precarious financial state with years of losses having made it difficult to set aside sufficient funds for the repayment of loans, many of which were due to mature in the 1950s and 1960s. To upgrade the existing tramway to modern standards and extend it into the new suburbs could not be contemplated. While he did not push for the immediate removal of the trams, preferring to run them as long as possible in part to pay off outstanding loans, he did strongly advocate for the introduction of diesel buses to replace trams when they were withdrawn. In this first report, his preference for diesel buses was not absolute, however, as he did recommend the use of trolley buses on the existing North Beach route which still had useful infrastructure in place and on the Papanui–Cashmere route where the trolley buses would have superior hill-climbing performance characteristics.

The board favoured a mixed trolley/diesel bus fleet and unsuccessfully tried in 1948 and 1949 to raise a loan to further this plan. Mindful of these earlier failures, they were careful to impress upon the public the dire consequences of not planning for bus replacements given the state of the tramway after deciding in April 1950 to purchase 39 diesel buses. The Loans Board subsequently approved this loan proposal in September and it was also sanctioned by a plebiscite of the board's ratepayers.

The Tramway Board, which had been hoping that the diesel buses would be a temporary measure on some routes pending the erection of a trolley bus system, ran into the opposition of the general manager who was a strong advocate for a standardised diesel bus fleet. He produced a report in December 1951 that was highly critical of trolley buses. Later that month, the board decided not to proceed with trolley buses and cancelled the order it had already placed for them. They were still undecided on the future of the Papanui–Cashmere route, the most profitable and popular of the tram routes, as they were not convinced that buses would be able to cope as a replacement. The general manager made a point of convincing the board that only buses could adequately serve its needs and those of its customers and finally succeeded in January 1953, when the board relented and agreed that this route would also be served by buses.

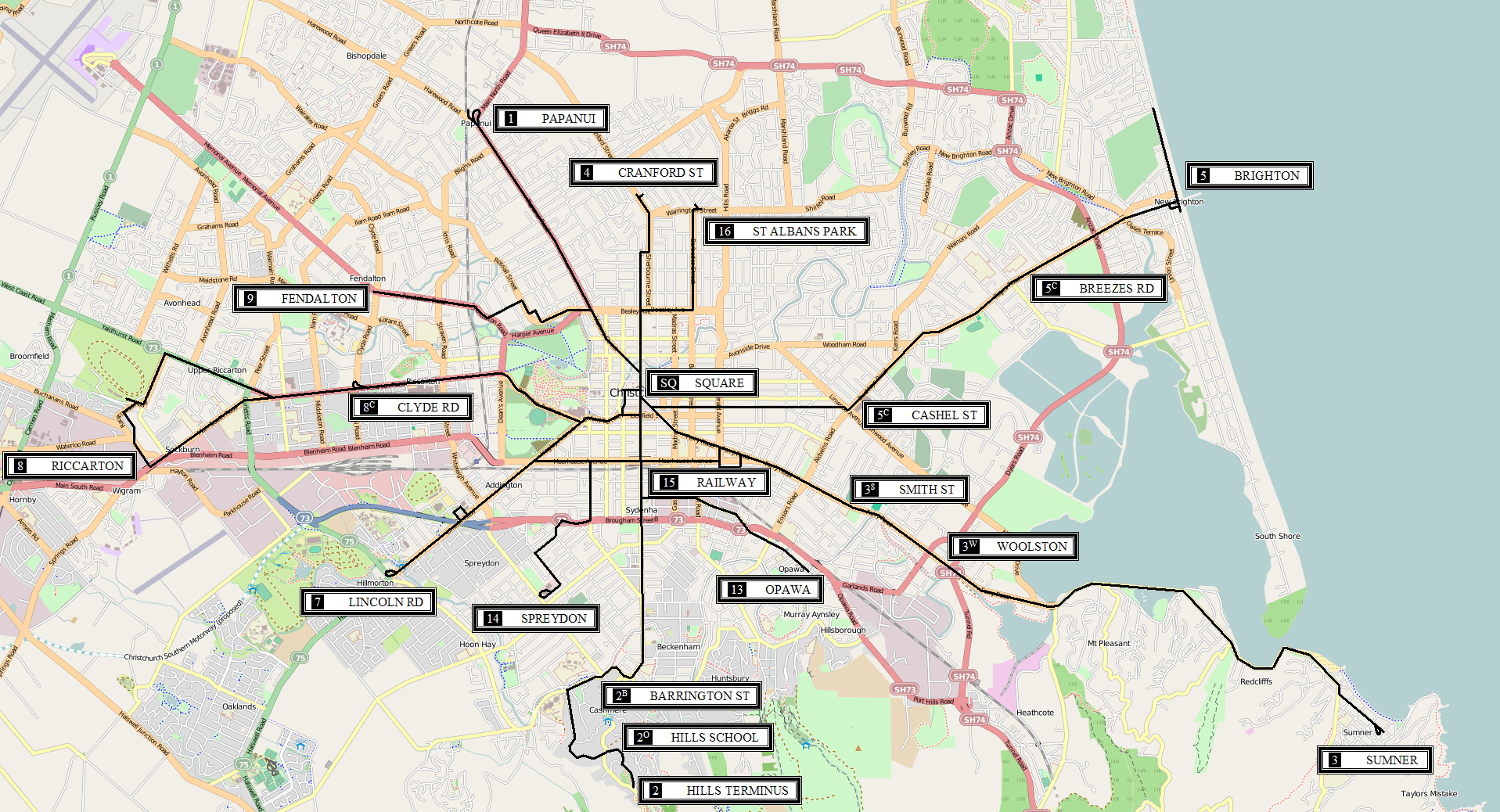
Christchurch Tramway Board electrified tramway network, January 1950

With the fate of the trams sealed, the remaining tram routes closed as a sufficient number of buses arrived from England to replace them. Since the Second World War, two tram routes had already closed: St. Martins on 20 May 1946 and Fendalton–Opawa on 6 February 1950. This was now accelerated with the remaining routes being closed over the next few years ago: New Brighton on 18 October 1952; Sumner on 6 December 1952; Riccarton on 14 June 1953; St. Albans Park–Spreydon on 21 June 1953; and Cranford Street–Lincoln Road on 26 July 1953.

The last route to close was Papanui–Cashmere for which the last timetabled services ran on Friday 10 September 1954. This was followed the next day by a ceremonial running of the last trams, a task performed by two Hills cars. After their journey to Papanui, then Cashmere, they returned to Cathedral Square where a huge crowd had gathered to witness the event. Speeches were made and a ribbon was cut to symbolically inaugurate the replacement bus service.

==== Disposition ====
The tram bodies were sold to private individuals, many of whom used them as sheds or huts, and the running gear was sold for scrap. Much of the tramway infrastructure was repurposed. Tram sheds at Riccarton and Sumner remained for many years afterwards, the Sumner shed being last used as a dye works factory. Tram shelters became bus stops and traction masts were reused as utility poles.

Little time was wasted in removing sleepered track, which was ploughed out of the ground, and the roads quickly rebuilt. There was also track fixed to concrete for which removal was a much more difficult proposition. As the price of materials recovered would not have met the cost of removing them, this track was simply covered over with a layer of tar that was reapplied when the road surface required renewal. This has caused problems when such roads have needed to be dug up for the installation of utilities and even in more modern times, old tram tracks have been discovered during excavations for the heritage tram circuit extension.

=== Ferrymead tramway: 1968–present ===
The genesis of tram preservation in Christchurch was the Tramway Preservation Association. Tramway enthusiasts set it up in 1960 with branches in Christchurch and Wellington. The Christchurch group aimed to restore to working order two tram vehicles formerly in service with the Canterbury Tramway Company, but then under the ownership of the Christchurch Transport Board. With the enthusiastic support of the board, work commenced on a Stephenson single-deck horse car of 1887 and Kitson steam motor no. 7 of 1881.

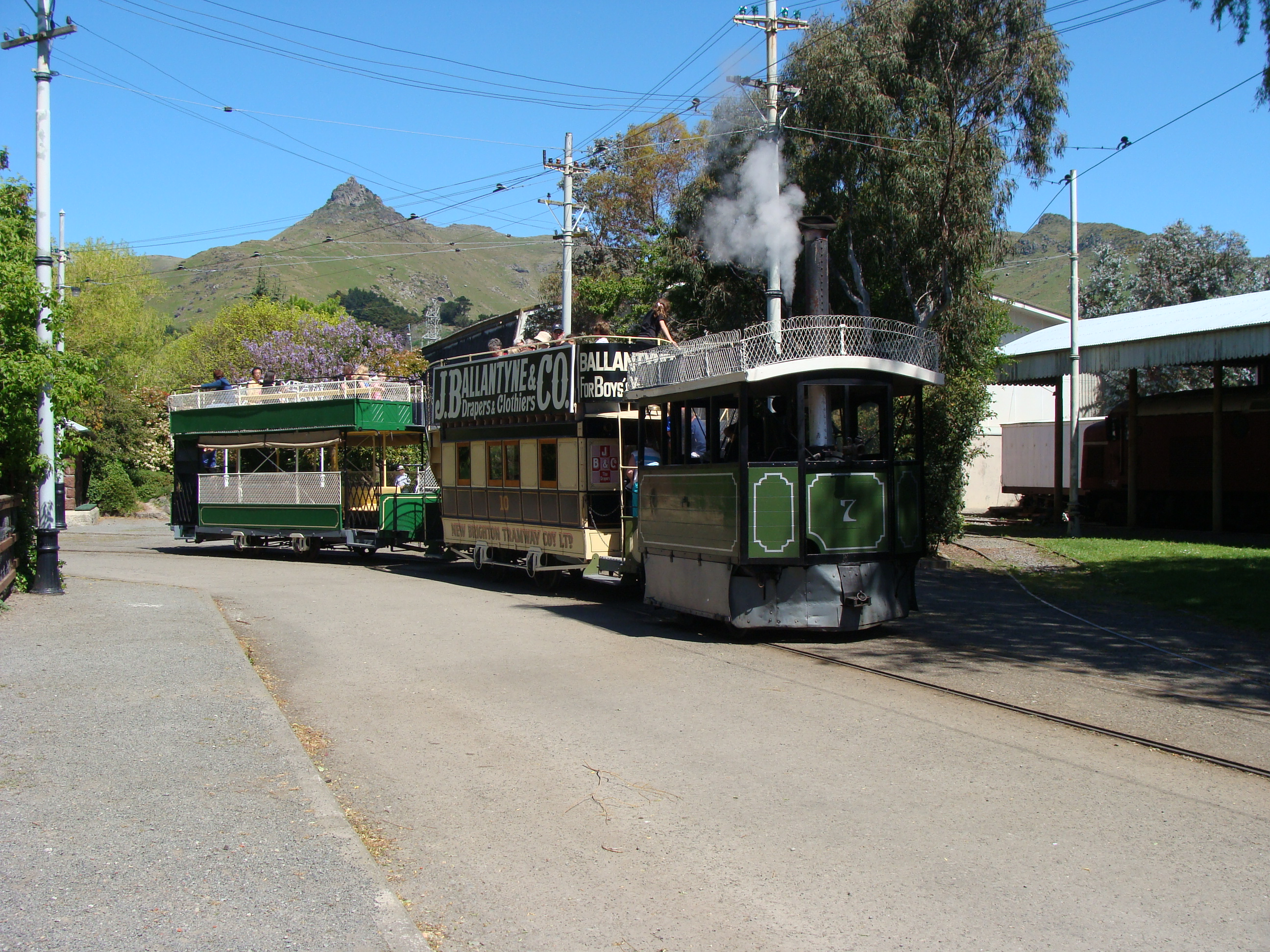
Kitson no. 7 hauling two trailers around the township loop at the Ferrymead Heritage Park

In 1964, the two branches of the association became independent with the Christchurch group becoming known as the Tramway Historical Society. It was also in August of that year that the restored horse car was run along the remaining section of track from the old Papanui line to mark ten years since the closure of the line, an event that also served to significantly boost the profile of the society and its membership.

The society, which had been using old Christchurch Transport Board tramway buildings for storage and restoration, created a purpose-built facility in 1967 on land obtained at the Ferrymead Historic Park. It was here that a permanent tramway was established and the society was able to realise its goal of making the tramway experience available to the general public. John Fardell, then general manager of the Christchurch Transport Board, officially opened the tramway on 6 January 1968. Rides were hauled using the society's Kitson steam motor as it was the only motive power available at the time.

A series of extensions to the tramway line opened over the next 16 years culminating in the completion of the Moorhouse township loop in 1984. Also during this period, the tramway was electrified, allowing the society to run its restored electric trams in addition to its horse- and steam-hauled vehicles.

=== Modern era: 1995–present ===
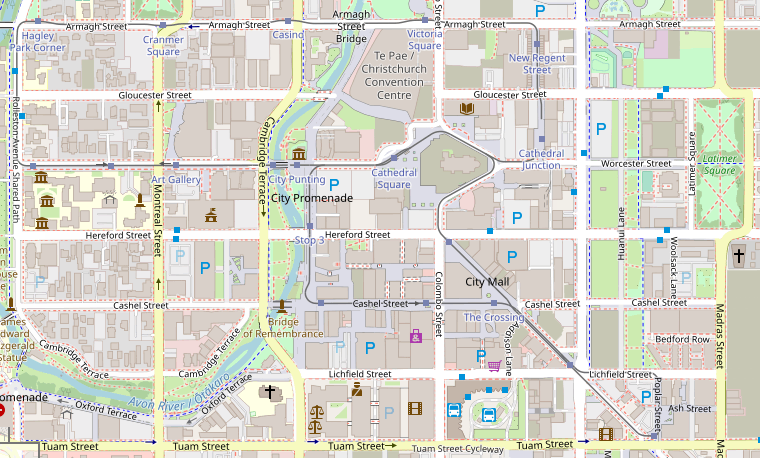
Central city heritage tramway circuit

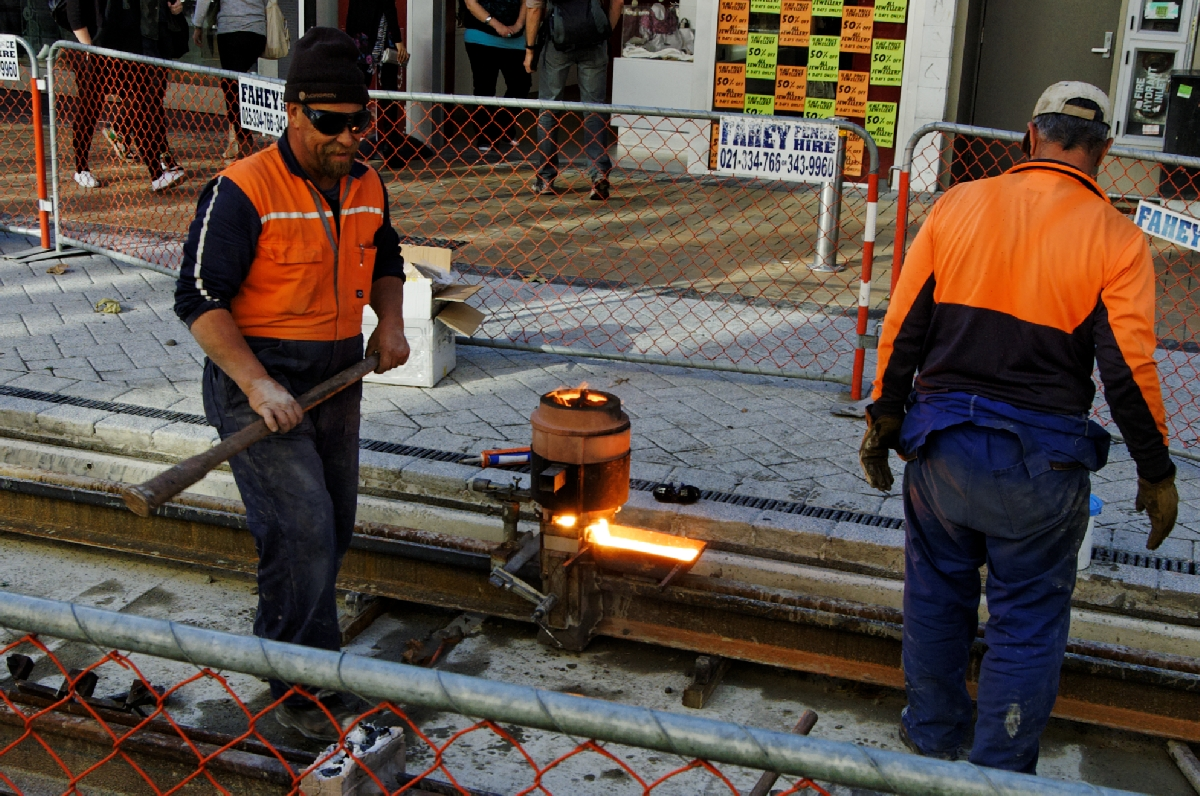
Workers join tram tracks in City Mall, March 2009

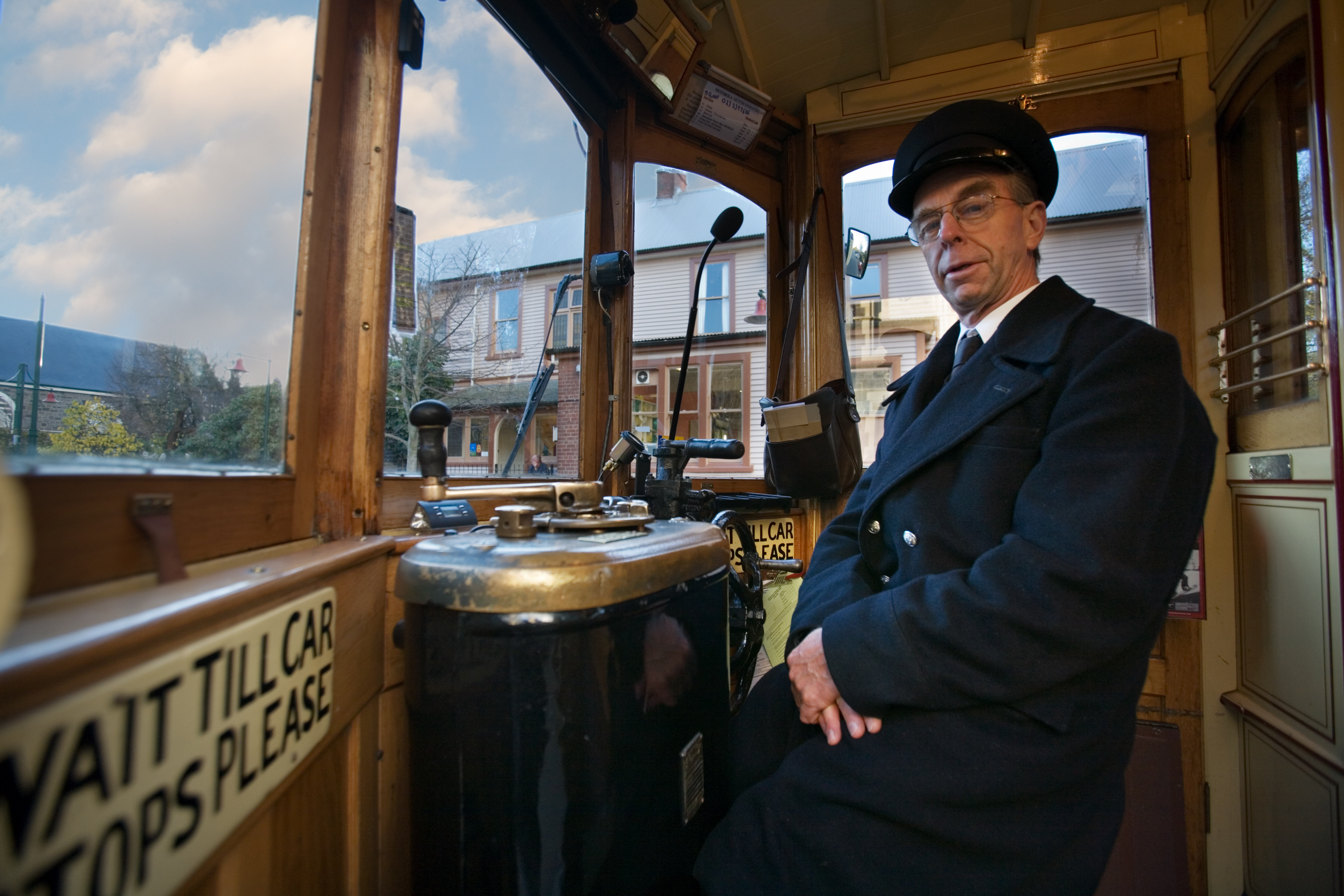
Tram driver

At the suggestion of the Tramway Historical Society, the city council included plans for a tramline in its Worcester Boulevard project in the early 1990s. It was originally intended to be a line extending along Worcester Street from Cathedral Square but was later extended into a circuit around the central city. The city council granted a licence to Christchurch Tramway Limited to run the tramway and it was opened on 4 February 1995 using vehicles leased from the Tramway Historical Society.

Wood Scenic Line Limited purchased the tramway in 2005 to run it as a commercial operation. As such, it is not considered to be part of the public transport system, with its primary focus being tourist traffic. Additional vehicles have been acquired by the tramway including a former Melbourne W2 tram that has been converted into a restaurant.

==== Post-earthquake ====
Christchurch was hit by a powerful earthquake on 22 February 2011 that damaged the heritage tram circuit. Services were suspended for approximately 1000 days from the 22 February 2011 earthquake until November 2013. The tramway reopened in November 2013 on a limited route from New Regent Street to Worcester Boulevard. In November 2014, the pre-earthquake loop reopened. The route was also extended to travel through the Re:START mall and High Street, which was under construction when the 2011 earthquake struck.

The extension is part of an additional loop planned and partially constructed during the late 2000s, and a new strategy report by Jan Gehl commissioned for council and published in early 2010 suggested an extension of the tram system (and integration of the trams into the general public transport system) as one of a package of measures aimed at reducing car dominance in the city.

== Operators ==
Christchurch's tramway lines were initially constructed and operated by several privately held companies, with the exception of the Corporation Line which was built by the city council and later operated by private companies. The precarious financial state of these companies early in the 20th century and the desire of Christchurch's residents for modern electric trams prompted the municipalisation of the tramway system. The Christchurch Tramway Board was formed and oversaw the operation of trams in Christchurch until they were withdrawn completely in 1954.

=== Canterbury Tramway Company: 1878–1893 ===
The Canterbury Tramway Company was the first of three private Christchurch tramway companies to be formed. The idea for the company began in 1877 with a group of local entrepreneurs and was realised by early the following year. A prospectus was published and shares issued.

The company initially enjoyed commercial success on commencement of its services in 1880 as the novelty of tram travel quickly became fashionable. A steady rise in patronage necessitated the purchase of additional rolling stock. The company's directors were able to report favourably on the company's position in 1881 giving shareholders cause to be optimistic about its future. New lines were opened between 1882 and 1888 resulting in a network of 17 miles (27 km) of tramway, with the Papanui and Sumner lines standing out as the most successful.

However, not all of the company's decisions proved to be sound, and in 1886 its brief 18-month tenure as operator of the Corporation Line joined a growing list of missteps. By the end of the 1880s the company's future was uncertain and it implemented several economy measures in an attempt to improve its fortunes. This included a permanent fare reduction, the replacement of steam motors with horses on some routes, and the introduction of a one man-operated tramcar. None of these measures were particularly successful.

By the early 1890s, the company's position had become dire and further attempts to alleviate its problems ensued including fare reductions and an increase in services. However, maintenance suffered which only served to further compound the company's troubles. A liquidator was finally appointed in March 1893. The company's failure has been attributed to various causes including a lack of revenue to cover expenditure on maintenance, competition, mismanagement, and an economic depression.

Following liquidation, attempts to get the council to assume control of the company, and to dispose of its assets, failed.

=== New Brighton Tramway Company: 1885–1906 ===
Following the city council's decision in early 1884 to construct the Corporation Line, a group of local residents informed the council of their intention to build a line from the end of the Corporation Line to New Brighton and registered the New Brighton Tramway Company in mid-1885.

Despite mediocre results for the company's first annual returns, its service was proving to be popular, garnering between 3,000 and 5,000 passengers per week.

One of the most important events for the company was becoming the operator of passenger services on the Corporation Line. The city council had put the operation up for tender in late 1888 and accepted the bid from the New Brighton Tramway Company. It began running its services on the line from 7 December after acquiring the remainder of the lease. This gave the company control over the line from the central city all the way out to New Brighton, allowing it to run a more efficient operation and carry many more passengers.

There were trying times ahead for the company in the form of competition from the Canterbury Tramway Company's Sumner line and the alternate Christchurch–New Brighton route established by the City and Suburban Tramway Company. Counter-measures implemented by the company resulted in only a modicum of success.

In 1906, the Company sold most of its assets to the Christchurch Tramway Board, retaining only its horses, harness, and central city property.

=== City and Suburban Tramway Company: 1892–1906 ===
The City and Suburban Tramway Company was formed in early 1892 for the purpose of establishing an alternative route from the city to New Brighton. An Order-in-Council was sought in May of that year for permission to construct the two lines it had planned, which was granted in November.

Construction of the company's line began in May 1893 but the company ran short of funds before the line was completed. It commenced services anyway in September 1893 but they were not able to run the full distance to New Brighton until the line was completed the following year in October 1894.

Financial woes continued and by the end of the company's third year of operation, it was in a parlous state. Renting horses and rolling stock because it could not afford to purchase its own in sufficient number was a significant expense, track maintenance was lacking, and a large debt was still owed to the construction contractor. Unable to meet its obligations, the company entered into voluntary liquidation.

After an attempt to sell the line and vehicles by tender failed, the company was taken over by the construction contractor in lieu of its debt to him. He continued to operate the business under the same name and was somewhat successful in improving the company's fortunes. The line was eventually sold to the Christchurch Tramway Board in 1906.

=== Christchurch Tramway Company: 1893–1905 ===
The Christchurch Tramway Company was formed from the remnants of the Canterbury Tramway Company after new capital was secured. This enabled the new company to commence work on improving the state of its assets. Various economy measures were also implemented including the closure and lifting of its Manchester Street line to Christchurch Railway Station and the replacement of steam motors with horses from September 1893 except on the Sumner line.

The company's only additions to its operations were the opening of extensions to two of its existing lines in the 1890s; the Addington line was extended to Sunnyside Asylum, and the Sydenham line was extended to Cashmere.

The company sought extensions to its city concessions (due to expire in September 1899) from the mid-1890s, without which it would not be able to invest further in its business or even, eventually, continue in operation. The various councils through whose territory the company operated eventually decided on municipalisation under the control of the Christchurch Tramway Board, which acquired the company in May 1905.

=== Christchurch Tramway Board: 1905–1989 ===
The Christchurch Tramway Board was an autonomous, democratically elected body with full authority to create and operate a tramway within its district. In addition to generating revenue through the collection of fares, it was given authority to levy rates within its district and to raise loans subject to ratepayer approval. The board itself had eight members elected by voters in each of its wards at triennial elections. A ninth member was later added.

The first election was held on 21 January 1903 and the newly elected board met several days later on the 29th. One of its first orders of business was to seek a mandate to raise two loans with which to fund the construction of the new tramway network, proposals that were carried by the ratepayers. For the first two years of its existence, the board spent much of its time planning the new tramway including decisions on such matters as track gauge, routes, electrical specifications, etc.

The board's financial performance was very sound in its early years, consistently returning a profit and increased patronage year-on-year. It was not until the 1919–1920 fiscal year that the board experienced its first loss, and then again in 1924–1925 and 1927–1928, a symptom of the increasingly difficult economic times ahead. After 1930–1931, the board never again made a profit with the exception of the war years. Despite this it still had a good financial base thanks to its reserve funds of which it had several to cover its various disbursements.

Following the boom of the war years, the board's financial position slowly declined as economic prosperity changed the market in which the Board operated. The rise of competition to the board's services and the irreparably dilapidated state of the tramway network led to its phased withdrawal in the decade following he war. Buses were the new thinking in public transport and following the example of many other cities around the world, they replaced trams as the way to move people around.

The board changed its name in 1951 to the Christchurch Transport Board to reflect its shift away from the tramway as the mainstay of its business. It disappeared as a result of the deregulation of the transport industry in 1989.^{*}

=== Christchurch City Council ===
==== Corporation Line ====
The council only intended to run the night soil service on its Corporation Line and to contract out the other functions to private operators. Tenders for working the line were called for in February 1886 with a three-year contract being awarded to Charles O'Malley. It soon became apparent that O'Malley was unsuitable and the contract was taken up by the Canterbury Tramway Company in August 1886.

Nominal through passenger services ran between Christchurch and New Brighton along the Corporation Line and the New Brighton Tramway Company's line with an interchange at "The Junction". Passengers were required to walk about 200 metres (660 ft) between the two services because neither company would traverse the distance, a situation that proved to be most unsatisfactory for all concerned. The lease for the Corporation Line was eventually transferred to the New Brighton Tramway Company in late 1888 and they remained the operator of the line until the Christchurch Tramway Board acquired it in 1906.

The council's rubbish disposal service operated during the early hours of the morning from August 1886 until 1902 when a new facility was established in Manchester Street. It involved the use of four men, two horses, two trolleys, and twelve tipcarts with extra men and horses required on Saturdays.

The tramway hearse was widely derided as a gimmick and was never used for its intended purpose. In 1888 it was suggested that the vehicle should be converted for use as a tramcar but was found to be unsuitable for this purpose and was eventually sold in August 1901.

==== Heritage circuit ====
The present-day heritage tram circuit around the central city was the result of a joint venture involving the city council, Christchurch Tramway Ltd., and the Tramway Historical Society. The council built the track as part of its Worcester Boulevard project.

The tram is currently operated as a Christchurch tourist attraction by Welcome Aboard, who also manage the Christchurch Gondola. Up to seven tram cars are currently in operation daily on the heritage circuit, providing both daytime transport services and a restaurant during evening hours. The tram circuit was closed in 2011 following the Christchurch earthquake, and was re-opened on a shortened loop in November 2013 before the full heritage loop was re-opened in November 2014. In 2016, local business groups also began in the Christchurch CBD.

== Propulsion systems ==
=== Horses ===
Horses, often the first form of motive power for early tramways elsewhere, were not introduced to Christchurch until 1882 by the Canterbury Tramway Company. They were found to be cheaper to use on shorter lines and where there were fewer passengers. Services provided by both the New Brighton Tramway Company and the City and Suburban Tramway Company were typically hauled by horses as that was the only form of motive power those companies owned.

Where horses were used, they were worked in shifts and changed several times a day. The nature of the work was such that the typical working life of a tramway horse was about four years. Though Christchurch's flat terrain was favourable to the operation of tramways, the task of the tramway horse was made more difficult upon occasion by the overloading of tramcars.

When the Christchurch Tramway Board assumed control of the tramways, it also acquired some horses from the private tramway companies as a transition measure until such time as its network was fully electrified. A lack of materials delayed the completion of the board's line along the route operated by the New Brighton Tramway Company, prompting the board to hire a private contractor for the supply of horses and drivers to continue to provide services using horse trams until the line was ready for electric tram operation the following year. Horses were also used by the board on the city to Richmond section of the old City and Suburban line for a short time, possibly due to the demands placed on their resources by the International Exhibition. Those horses that became surplus to requirements were sold to farmers.

=== Steam ===
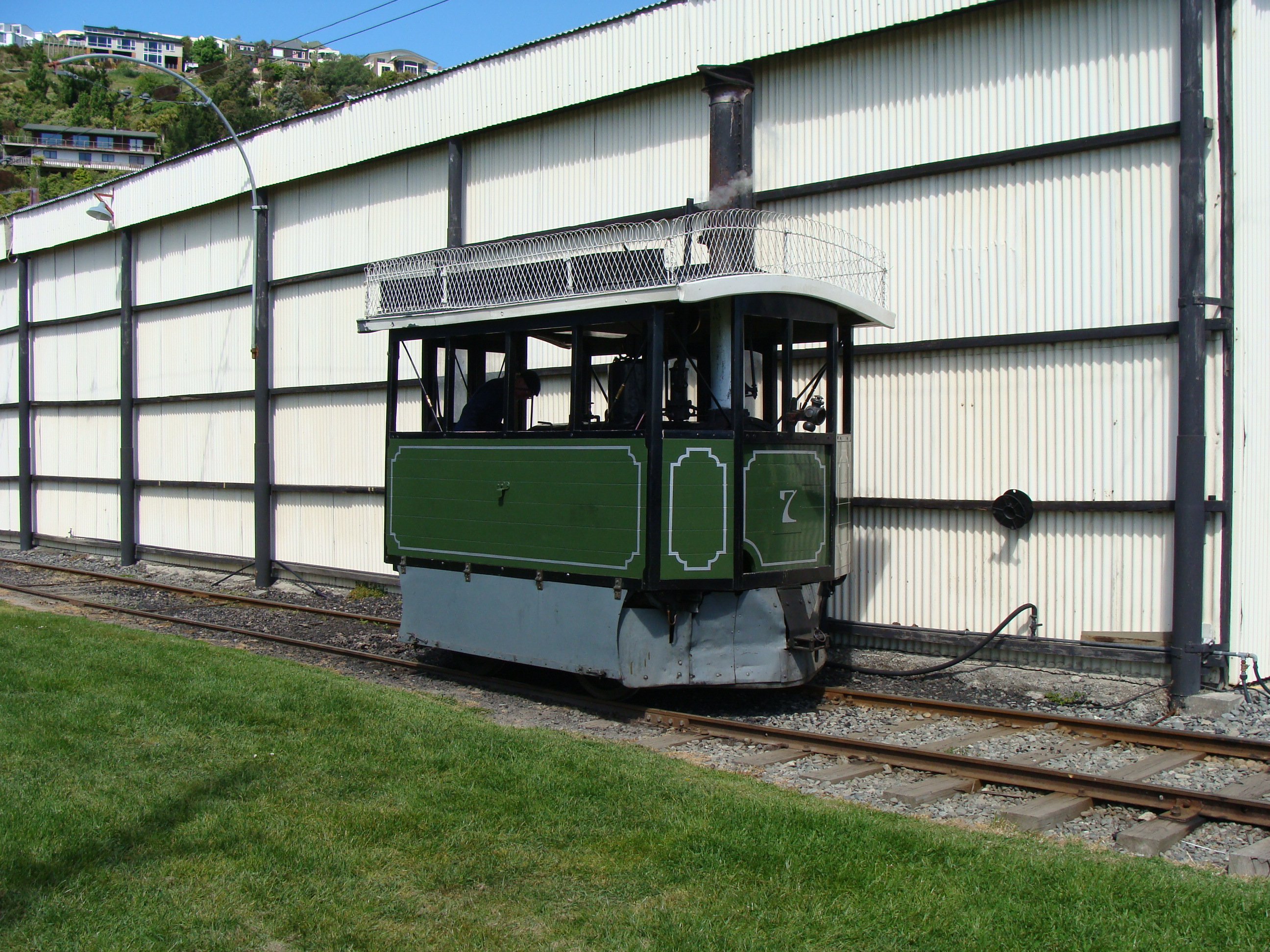
Kitson No. 7 outside a Tramway Historical Society barn at the Ferrymead Heritage Park

Of the private tramway companies based in Christchurch, only the Canterbury Tramway Company and its successor, the Christchurch Tramway Company, ever operated steam motors. The Canterbury Company initially purchased five Kitson steam motors, later ordering a further three. One was scrapped in 1893, and the remaining seven were sold to the Christchurch Tramway Board when the Company ceased operation in 1905.

The board continued to use steam motors for regular services for a couple of years after commencing operations until its lines were fully electrified, but even then continued to use them as demand required it. Several were scrapped in the 1920s, but some were retained for use as shunters and in maintenance work until 1935. Three (Kitsons 6, 7, 8) were reconditioned as an emergency wartime measure in 1942. During this time, they were also available for charter and special occasions. Kitson no. 7 was the only steam motor still in service by 1950, and the Tramway Historical Society at the Ferrymead Heritage Park is now its custodian.

Only one other steam motor was used on the Christchurch Tramway System, a Baldwin locomotive purchased from the New South Wales Government Railways to help out with the International Exhibition and with existing services as horses were being withdrawn.

=== Electricity ===
Power was initially provided for the tram network by three direct current turbo-generators in the Falsgrave Street powerhouse. There was also an accumulator battery in the powerhouse used during the start-up phase and for smoothing the power supply. The generators were run using superheated steam from coal-fired boilers. Electricity was supplied to the trolley wires at a nominal 600 V DC.

Some special occasions, such as race days, required a large number of trams and trailers to convey all of the patrons. For these events, trams were typically dispatched in convoy for track control purposes (to avoid collisions). Even so, the demand they placed on the power supply was so great that the trams were often slowed to a walking pace.

The tramway power supply was improved in the 1920s when automatic substations were installed in Cashmere (1920) and Fendalton (1922) to boost power to southern and western sections respectively when required. They were supplied AC power from the State hydro scheme and converted it to DC for use by the trams. Mercury-arc rectifiers were installed in 1949 displacing the old rotary converters and steam plant, which were decommissioned prior to the end of the tramway.

== Vehicles ==
=== Manufacturers ===
In Christchurch, several firms constructed trailers and horse-trams: Boon & Stevens (later Boon & Co), Moor and Sons, and Booth McDonald and Co.

=== Rolling stock ===
A double-decker horsecar tram was built by William Moor & Son in November 1880 for the Canterbury Tramway Company, possibly the first built in New Zealand. The car was a facsimile of imported carriages; with ash framing, panelling of American whitewood, and roofs and window frames of oak and hickory. Brass fittings were supplied by Scott Brothers of Christchurch, and the only imported parts were the chilled cast iron wheels. A contemporary report described the car as a most creditable specimen of local industry. The coachwork was equal to that of the American vehicles, and a much needed improvement had been made on the roof 'by the addition of a board running along the outside, for the special benefit of the female patronisers of the tramway'.

Boon and Co, of Ferry Road then St Asaph St, started with horse-trams for the New Brighton Company. From 1921 to 1926 they built 23 48-seater electric saloon trams (which could be coupled in pairs) for the Christchurch Tramway Board.

A distinctive feature of many Australasian trams was the drop-centre, a lowered central section between bogies (wheel-sets), to make passenger access easier by reducing the number of steps required to get inside of the vehicle. The trams made by Boon & Co in 1906–07 for Christchurch may have been the first with this feature; they were referred to as drop-centres or Boon cars. Trams for Christchurch and Wellington built in the 1920s with an enclosed section at each end and an open-sided middle section were also known as Boon cars, but did not have the drop-centre.

== Future ==
=== Heritage circuit expansion ===
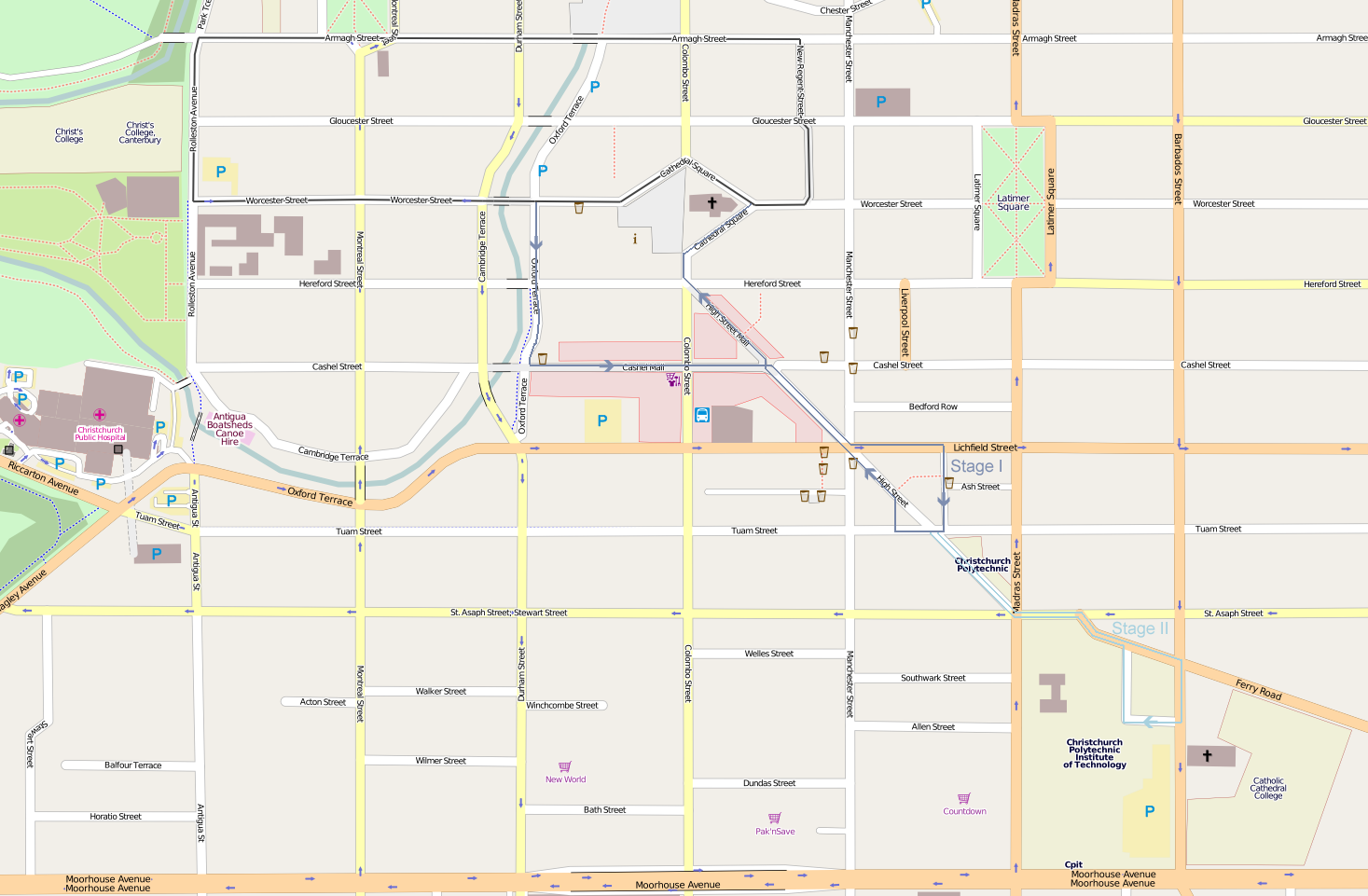
Central city heritage circuit with approved extensions

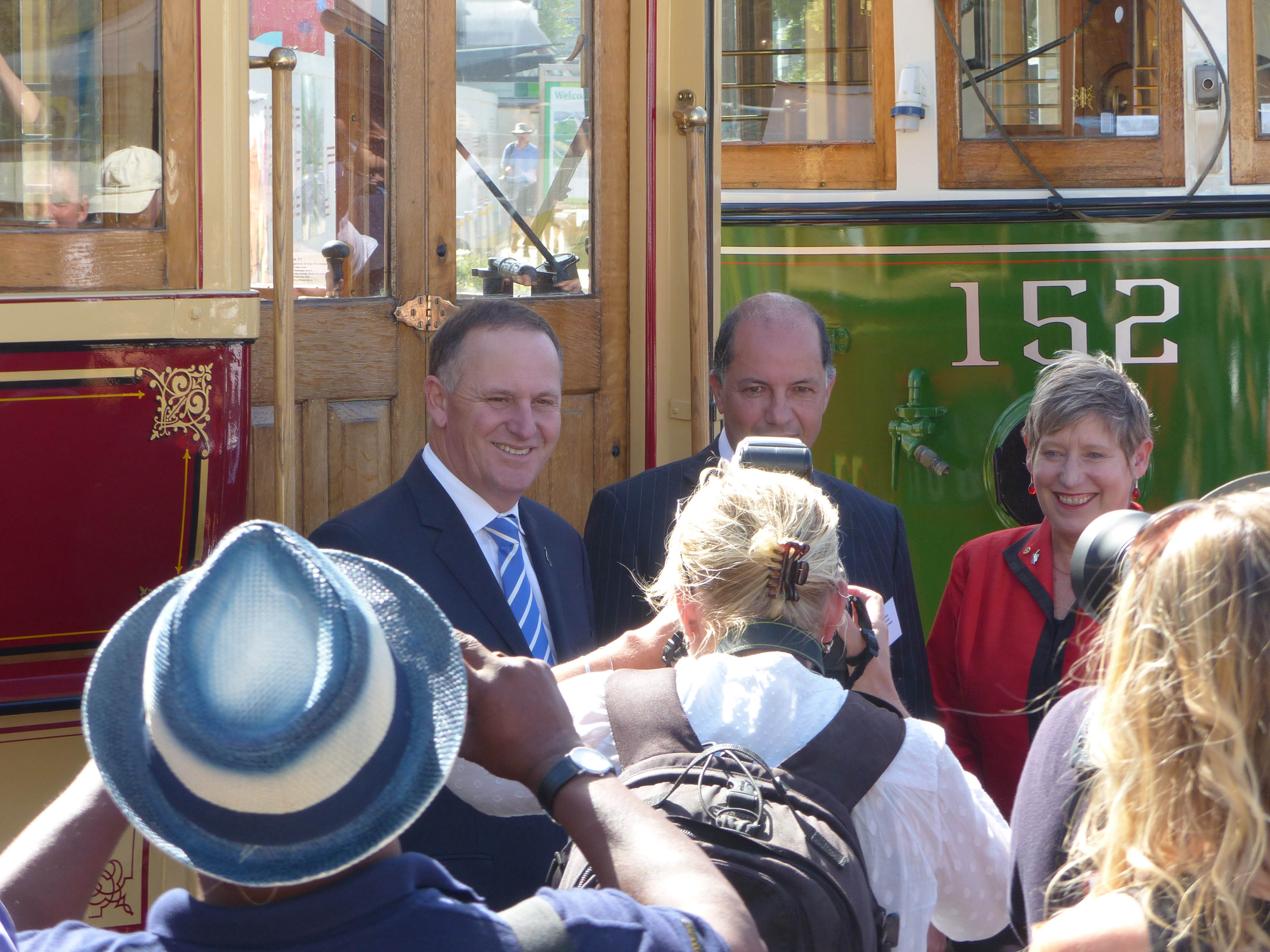
Launch of the stage 1 extension on 12 February 2015 by Prime Minister John Key and the mayor of Christchurch, Lianne Dalziel

The Christchurch Long-Term Council Community Plan 2009–2019, adopted 30 June 2009, confirmed the council's intention to extend the existing tram circuit in the central city, for which $11.5m was set aside. The extension will be constructed in two stages, with the first stage expected to have been ready in time for the 2011 Rugby World Cup and the second stage to be completed by the summer of 2013.

The first stage will involve a new loop, connected to the existing circuit, running down Oxford Terrace, through the Cashel Mall, down High Street to the corner with Tuam Street, and back up High Street to Colombo Street where it will join the existing circuit behind the cathedral. The original plan for the second stage was a line running down the remainder of High Street, along Ferry Road, and terminating in a smaller loop around Barbados Street and Williams Street, but it has since been suggested that the line should run through the grounds of the Christchurch Polytechnic Institute of Technology.

Construction began on the first stage in August 2009. Much of this extension was complete prior to the February 2011 earthquake, including the section through the Cashel Mall and along High Street from Colombo Street to Cashel Street. The condition of the tracks has been assessed by the council with a view to determining the future of the extension.

A significant portion of the stage 1 tramway extension opened to the public on 12 February 2015. The trams run the complete stage 1 extension route up to the High and Lichfield Street intersection, where the trams will then continue using the northbound track via a new set of points. Total route length has been increased to 4 kilometres (2.5 mi).

=== Public Space Public Life study ===
The Christchurch City Council commissioned the Public Space Public Life study in 2009 from renowned urban designer Jan Gehl in 2009. He was tasked with determining how the central city could be enhanced to improve public access and create a better sense of community. The report advocates for a shift away from private transport towards public transport (including trams/light rail) and active modes such as walking and cycling.

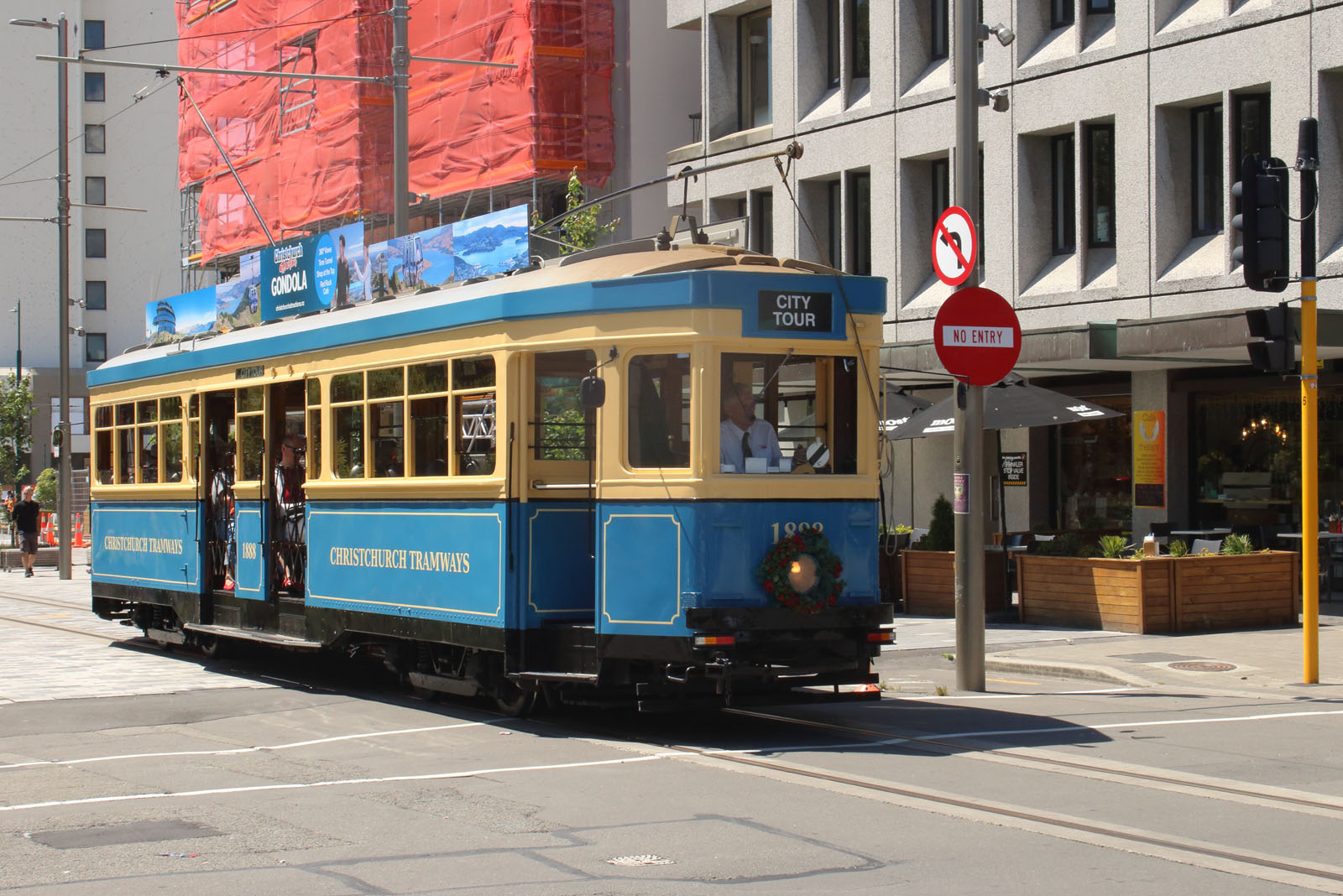
A blue tram in the city centre in 2019. Christchurch trams are of multiple different colours.

=== Political aspirations ===
Former Christchurch mayor Bob Parker, a well-known advocate for rail-based transport, has pointed out that the trend for traffic congestion in Christchurch is for it to only get worse. He does not believe that roads will be able to meet the city's needs in the future and that they will reach a saturation point if alternatives are not developed. Relying on a bus-based system, as has been the focus of the regional council, will not be enough to attract a sufficient number of people away from their private vehicles and onto public transport.

During his 2007–2010 term, he visited several American cities with successful examples of light rail networks. He envisages a system for Christchurch of tram-trains that utilise the existing heavy rail network where possible and then light rail for street running to access areas not currently served by rail such as the central city. In such a system, buses would remain but would provide feeder services to light rail instead of running core routes.

The 2010 IBM Commuter Pain Survey, which was conducted in three major New Zealand cities including Christchurch, has highlighted how entrenched attitudes towards public transport and the ephemeral benefits enjoyed by commuters using private vehicles has thus far proved to be a barrier to greater adoption of public transport. Despite this, the mayor is confident that rail-based options will provide a sufficiently attractive alternative.

In response to the major earthquakes of 2010 and 2011, the Central City Plan adopted by the Christchurch City Council calls for the establishment of a light-rail network in Christchurch. Initially, a line between the central city and the University of Canterbury would be built at a cost of $406m to trial the idea while a study would be conducted to assess the feasibility of extending the network to other destinations such as Christchurch International Airport, Hornby, Lyttelton, Northlands Shopping Centre, and New Brighton. Heritage tram services would remain in the central city but that operation is under review pending decisions on when it will be safe to repair the infrastructure and run services but also options for linking it with public transport services.

== See also ==
- Christchurch tramway routes
- Ferrymead
- Public transport in New Zealand
- Trams in New Zealand

== Notes ==
- ^* The history of the Christchurch Tramway Board included here is only the period in which it operated the tramway. The organisation continued to exist after this time as a bus-only operator.
