= Mount Cavendish =

Mountain in New Zealand

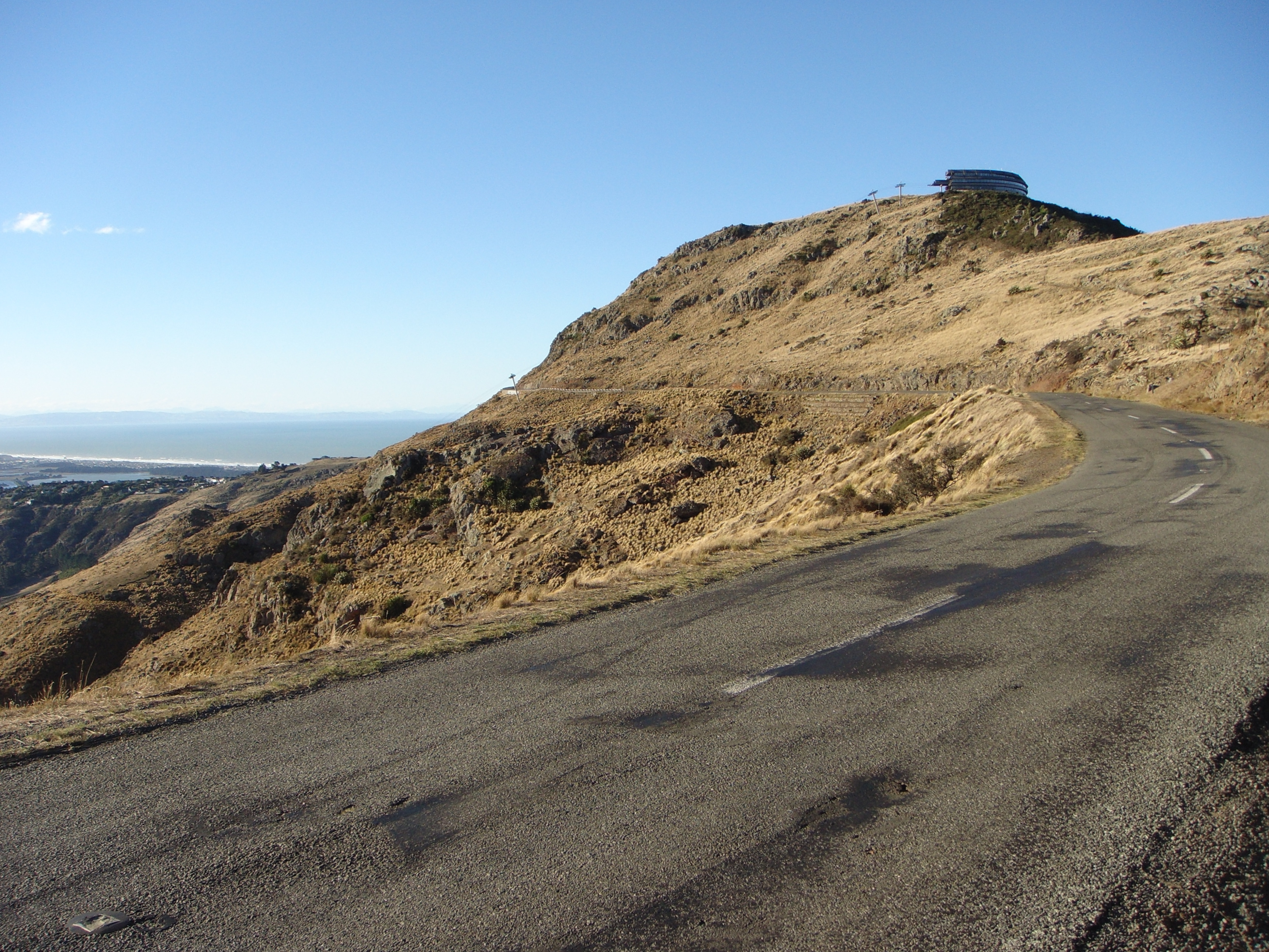
- Mount Cavendish with the gondola on its peak

Highest point
- Elevation: 448 m (1,470 ft)
- Coordinates: 43°35′22″S 172°42′57″E

Geography
- Location: Christchurch
- Parent range: Port Hills

Mount Cavendish is located in the Port Hills, with views over Christchurch, New Zealand and Lyttelton. It is part of the crater wall of the extinct volcano that formed Lyttelton Harbour. The Mount Cavendish Reserve displays some of the best examples of lava flow to be seen on the Port Hills.

== History ==
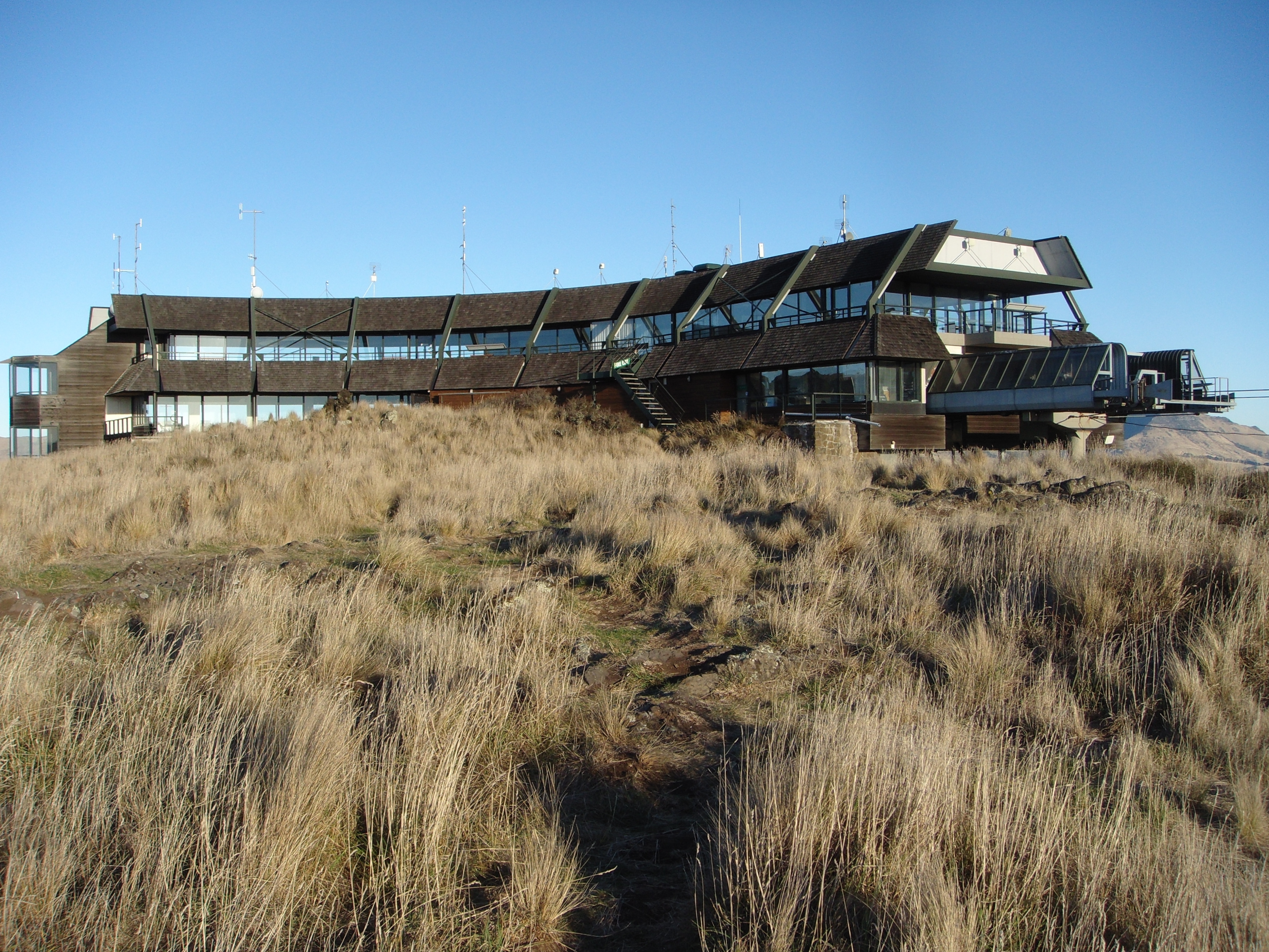
Christchurch Gondola terminal on Mount Cavendish

Mount Cavendish was first transferred to the Crown for a Scenic Reserve in 1910, by the Morten Brothers. The mountain was first named Hill Morten in 1912 by Harry Ell, in recognition of the Morten family's gifts of land for the Summit Road and scenic reserves.

The name Mount Cavendish was first given to nearby Mount Pleasant (after which a suburb is now named) in 1848, but did not stick and the peak of Hill Morten was named Mount Cavendish after the Hon. Richard Cavendish of the Canterbury Association.

== Description ==
It is 448 metres (1,470 feet) high and falls within the Mount Cavendish Scenic Reserve, which sits at the top of the Heathcote Valley, close to the northern entrance to the Lyttelton Road Tunnel.

Mount Cavendish is located approximately 10 km from Dyers Pass, and 4.7 km from Evans Pass via the Summit Road. On foot, it can be accessed via the Crater Rim Walkway or the Bridle Path (which connects Heathcote Valley and Lyttelton). Access is also via the Christchurch Gondola, which has its lower terminal located on Bridle Path Road, in Heathcote Valley. The gondola opened on 24 November 1992.

It was closed following the 2011 Christchurch earthquake, not reopening until March 2013.
