= Christchurch Gondola =

Gondola in Christchurch, New Zealand

Coordinates: 43°35′6″S 172°42′29″E

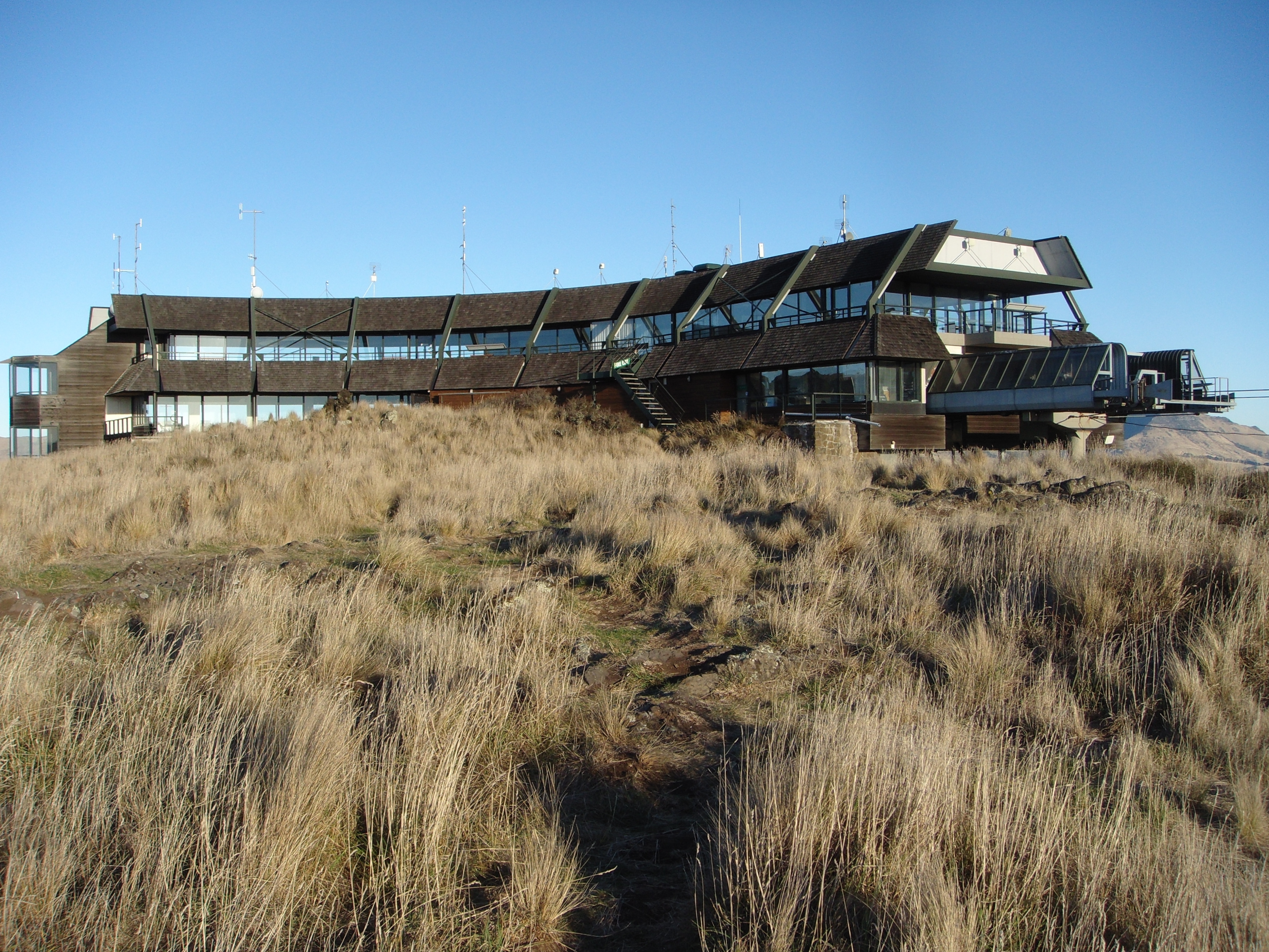
Christchurch Gondola terminal on Mount Cavendish

The Christchurch Gondola is a tourist attraction service offered by Christchurch Attractions in Christchurch, New Zealand. The gondola base is located in Heathcote Valley, and it traverses the slopes of Mount Cavendish in the Port Hills. Also known as a cable car, the Christchurch Gondola's course is 1,000 metres (1,100 yd) in length, and from the summit it is possible to see across the city of Christchurch and the Canterbury Plains to the Southern Alps in the north and west, and down into Lyttelton Harbour and Banks Peninsula in the south and east. Sometimes used as a transport method for visitors who use the walking tracks on Mt Cavendish, the gondola is ranked as one of the top tourist attractions in Christchurch by TripAdvisor. The summit is 445 metres (1,460 ft) above sea level.

The gondola opened as the Mount Cavendish Gondola in October 1992 after a long planning process at a costs of $NZ11.5 million. The land around the gondola was landscaped with 16,000 native tussock after the completion of construction. The gondola includes 19 cabins and has a capacity of 812 travellers per hour.

== 2011 Christchurch earthquake ==
The gondola closed following the 2011 Christchurch earthquake, and was reopened in March 2013 by former New Zealand Prime Minister John Key.

== 2016 breakdown ==
In February 2016, the gondola broke down with passengers trapped in the cabins for two hours without communication from the operator. The managing director's comment that the incident was "no big deal" caused upset by those affected. Within days, the company vowed to install a speaker system into the cabins at a cost of up to NZ$50,000 so that communication to stuck passengers became possible.

== Operator ==
The Christchurch Gondola is operated by Christchurch Attractions, who also currently operate the Christchurch Tram system.

== Getting there ==
By car or rideshare, the site is approximately a 15-minute drive from central Christchurch. Free parking is available in the base station car park.

A gondola shuttle service operates daily between Cathedral Square (Tram Stop 2) in central Christchurch and the Christchurch Gondola. In summer, the shuttle departs from Cathedral Square every half-hour from 09:30 to 15:30, returning from the gondola on the hour from 10:00 to 16:00. In winter, departures from Cathedral Square occur hourly from 10:00 to 15:00, with return trips from the gondola on the half-hour from 10:30 to 15:30. Return and one-way tickets are available from the tram host at Tram Stop 2 or directly from the driver (card payments only).

Bus number 8 runs year-round from the Christchurch Bus Interchange and stops directly outside the Christchurch Gondola base station.

A bike rack is located immediately to the left of the base station entrance for visitors arriving by bicycle.
