= Richard Cavendish (1794–1876) =

English nobleman and politician

The Hon. Richard Cavendish
- Born: 23 December 1794; Waterpark, County Cork, Ireland
- Died: 18 March 1876 (aged 81); Thornton Hall, Buckinghamshire
- Spouse: Elizabeth Margaret Hart (married 1841)

Richard Cavendish (23 December 1794 – 18 March 1876) was an English nobleman, politician, Member of Parliament, and a member of the Canterbury Association.

== Biography ==
Cavendish was born in Waterpark, County Cork, Ireland, in 1794. He was the second son of Richard Cavendish, 2nd Baron Waterpark and Juliana Cooper. Sir Henry Cavendish, 2nd Baronet, was his grandfather. His elder brother Henry Cavendish, 3rd Baron Waterpark succeeded their father in the family titles. His sister Sarah Georgiana Cavendish married Sir George Philips, 2nd Baronet. His sister Catherine Cavendish married Bishop Thomas Musgrave. On 22 July 1841, he married Elizabeth Maria Margaret Hart at Uttoxeter.

He went into civil service in 1811 for the East India Company. In the 1820s, he was a Member of Parliament. By 1831, he lived in Gwalior, India. He was an envoy in Nagpur by 1835. He became a director of the East India Company. This was followed by roles as magistrate in Stafford, deputy lieutenant for Staffordshire, and deputy lieutenant for Buckinghamshire. In 1851, he was High Sheriff of Buckinghamshire.

On 27 March 1848, he joined the Canterbury Association and immediately became a member of the management committee. It was an organisation set up to establish a colony to be known as Canterbury in the South Island of New Zealand. Together with Lord Lyttelton, John Simeon and Edward Gibbon Wakefield, he guaranteed £15,000 to the Canterbury Association, which saved it from financial collapse.

He joined the Ecclesiological Society in 1864 and became a committee member.

He resided at Thornton Hall, near Stony Stratford, Buckinghamshire, and Crakemarsh Hall in Staffordshire. He died on 18 March 1876 at Thornton Hall. The worth of his probate was £160,000.

The locality Cavendish inland from Ashburton on the true right bank of the Ashburton River / Hakatere was named by Edward George Wright after Richard Cavendish. Mount Cavendish in Christchurch's Port Hills was named by a marine survey party in early 1850 after Richard Cavendish.

== Personal life ==
On 22 July 1841, he married Elizabeth Maria Margaret Hart, daughter of Thomas Hart. They had nine children:

- Marianne Cavendish (died 1888)
- Catherine Elizabeth Cavendish (died 1931)
- Emily Maria Georgiana Cavendish (died 1929)
- Elizabeth Dorothy Cavendish (died 1904)
- Cecilia Augusta Cavendish (died 1909)
- unknown son
- unknown daughter
- William Thomas Cavendish (1843–1878)
- Charles Tyrell Cavendish (1849–1903)

He died on 18 March 1876.
