= Heathcote Valley =

Suburb of Christchurch, New Zealand

- Suburb
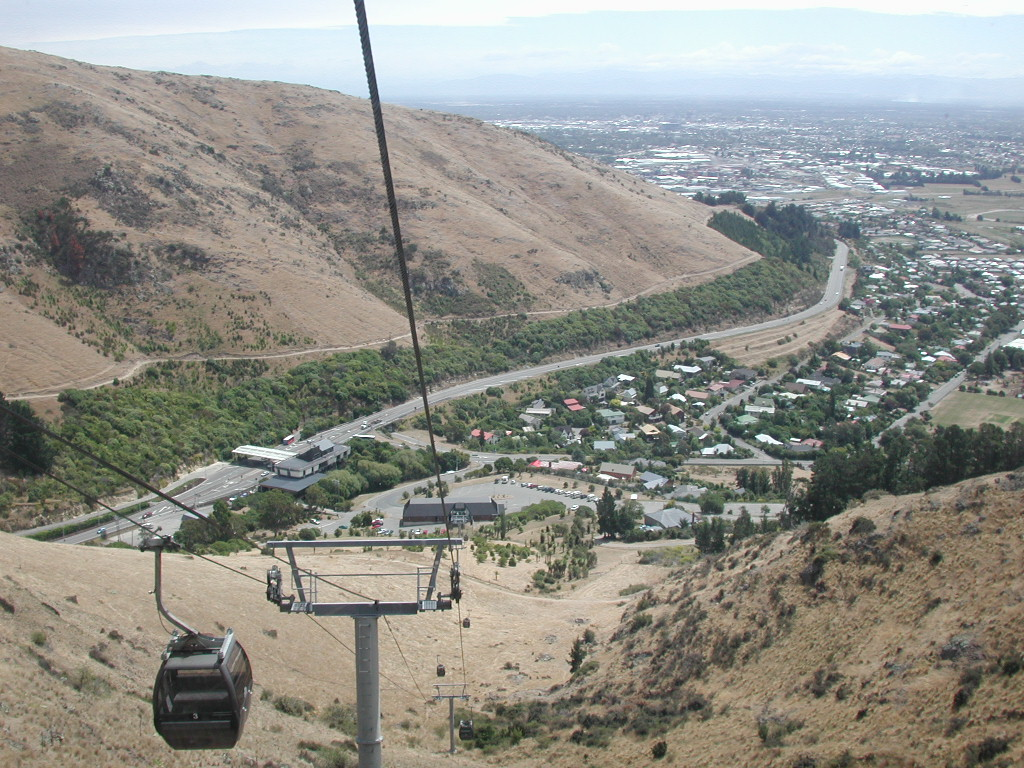
- View from gondola into Heathcote Valley
- Interactive map of Heathcote Valley
- Coordinates: 43°35′S 172°43′E
- Country: New Zealand
- City: Christchurch
- Local authority: Christchurch City Council
- Electoral ward: Heathcote
- Community board: Waihoro Spreydon-Cashmere-Heathcote

Area
  - Land: 420 ha (1,000 acres)

Population (June 2025)
  - Total: 2,430
  - Density: 580/km^{2} (1,500/sq mi)

Woolston	Ferrymead	Mount Pleasant
	Heathcote Valley	Sumner
	Port Hills

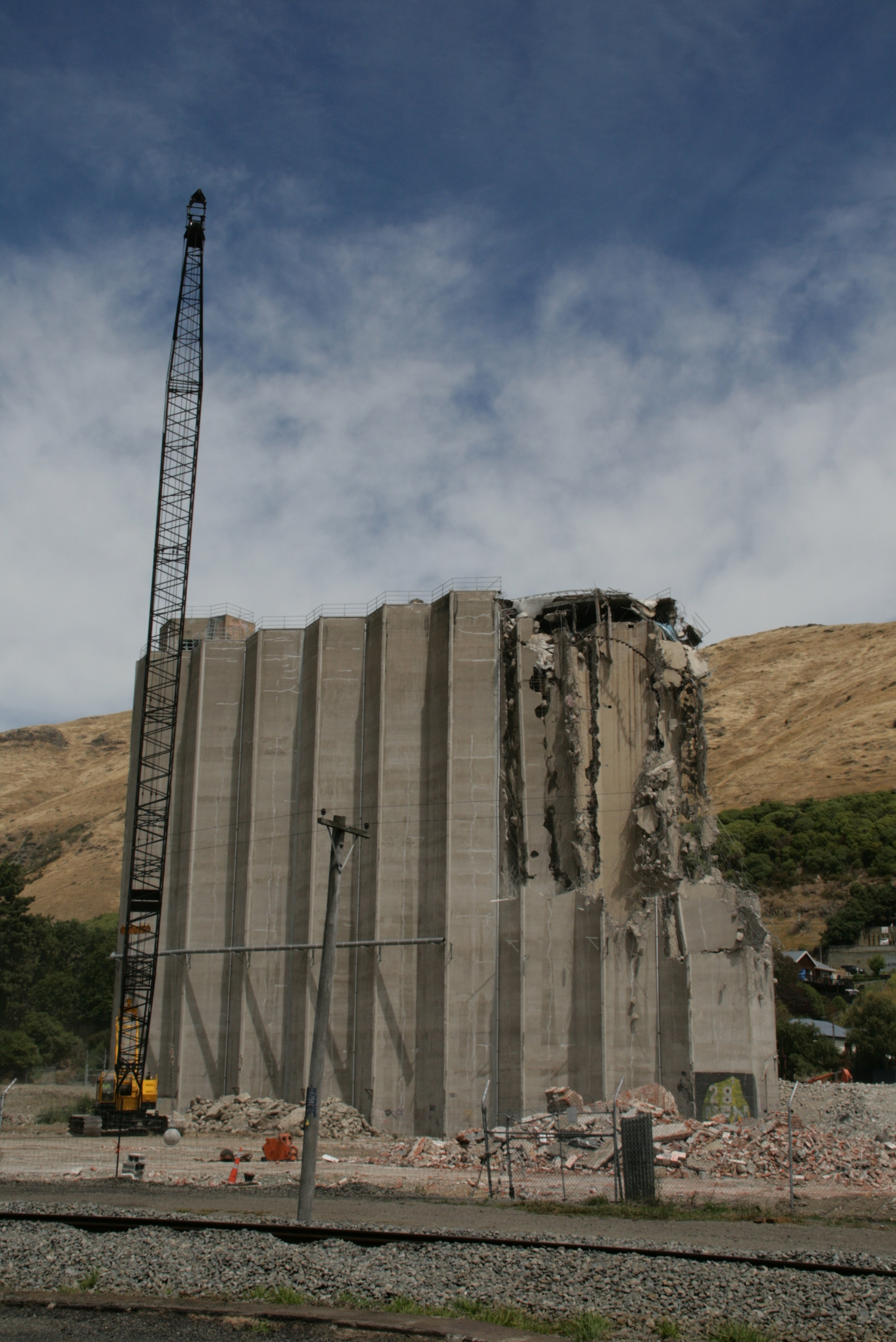
Heathcote grain silos falling to the wreckers ball on 26 January 2012

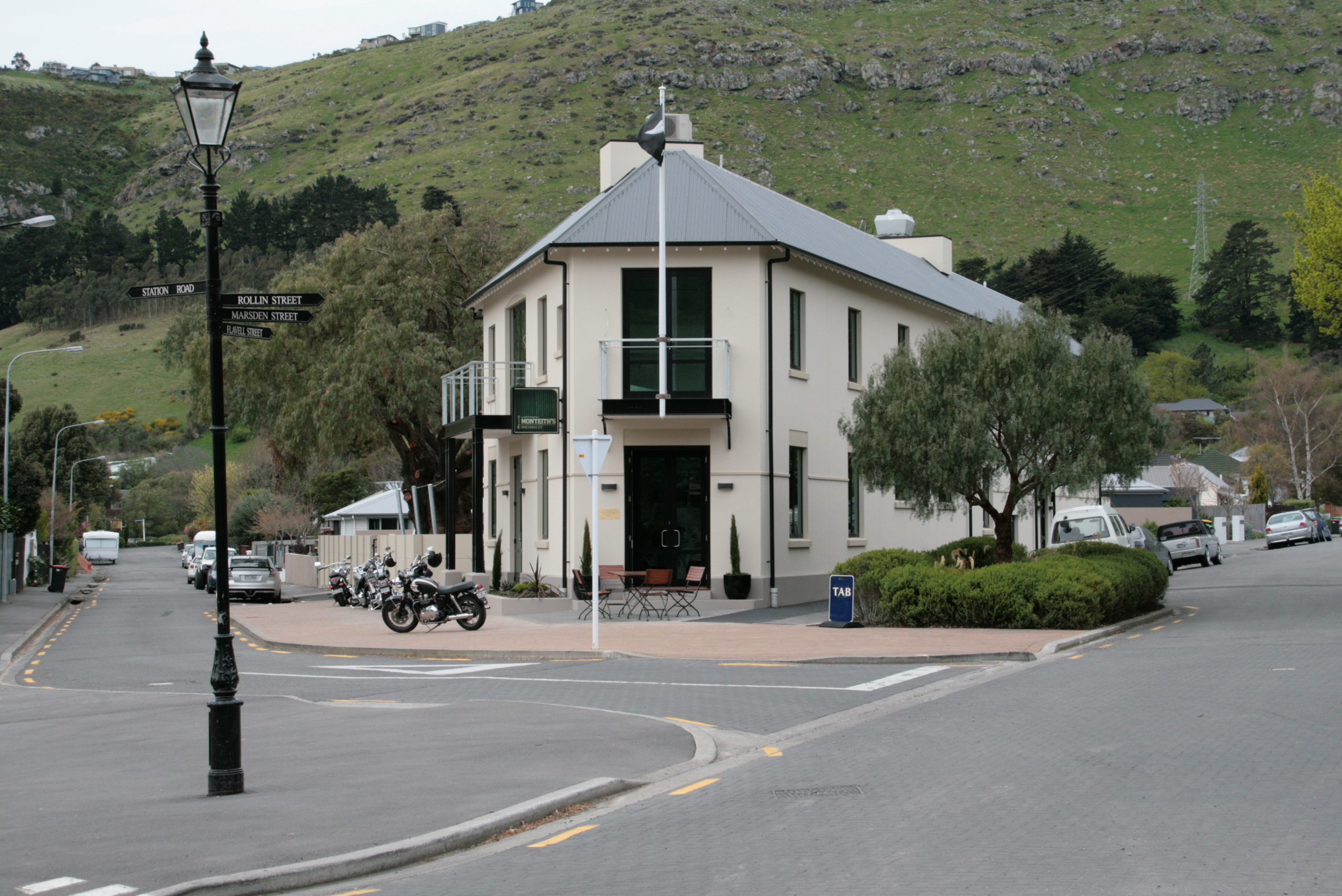
The new Triangle Tavern in 2011

Heathcote Valley is a suburb of Christchurch, New Zealand. It is named after Sir William Heathcote, who was secretary of the Canterbury Association.

== Location ==
Heathcote is 8 kilometres (5 mi) southeast of the city centre. It is site of the lower terminus of the Christchurch Gondola, which goes up to the top of Mount Cavendish on the Port Hills.

== History ==
In the past Heathcote was known for its orchards, brickworks and maltworks. The distinctive towers of the Canterbury Malting Company's maltworks dominated the skyline until 2012 when it was demolished to make way for residential developments.

== Demographics ==
Heathcote Valley covers 4.20 km^{2} (1.62 sq mi). It had an estimated population of 2,430 as of June 2025, with a population density of 579 people per km^{2}.

Historical population
Year	Pop.	±% p.a.
2006	2,172	—
2013	2,118	−0.36%
2018	2,229	+1.03%
2023	2,379	+1.31%

Heathcote Valley had a population of 2,379 in the 2023 New Zealand census, an increase of 150 people (6.7%) since the 2018 census, and an increase of 261 people (12.3%) since the 2013 census. There were 1,131 males, 1,239 females, and 12 people of other genders in 1,008 dwellings. 3.5% of people identified as LGBTIQ+. The median age was 47.7 years (compared with 38.1 years nationally). There were 354 people (14.9%) aged under 15 years, 345 (14.5%) aged 15 to 29, 1,107 (46.5%) aged 30 to 64, and 573 (24.1%) aged 65 or older.

People could identify as more than one ethnicity. The results were 93.2% European (Pākehā); 8.7% Māori; 1.4% Pasifika; 3.8% Asian; 0.8% Middle Eastern, Latin American and African New Zealanders (MELAA); and 2.9% other, which includes people giving their ethnicity as "New Zealander". English was spoken by 97.9%, Māori by 2.4%, Samoan by 0.3%, and other languages by 8.8%. No language could be spoken by 1.4% (e.g. too young to talk). New Zealand Sign Language was known by 0.4%. The percentage of people born overseas was 22.6, compared with 28.8% nationally.

Religious affiliations were 28.2% Christian, 0.5% Hindu, 0.4% Islam, 0.5% Māori religious beliefs, 0.4% Buddhist, 0.8% New Age, 0.1% Jewish, and 1.3% other religions. People who answered that they had no religion were 60.9%, and 6.6% of people did not answer the census question.

Of those at least 15 years old, 600 (29.6%) people had a bachelor's or higher degree, 1,044 (51.6%) had a post-high school certificate or diploma, and 387 (19.1%) people exclusively held high school qualifications. The median income was $40,700, compared with $41,500 nationally. 246 people (12.1%) earned over $100,000 compared to 12.1% nationally. The employment status of those at least 15 was 954 (47.1%) full-time, 324 (16.0%) part-time, and 33 (1.6%) unemployed.

== Education ==
Heathcote Valley School (Māori: Te Kura o Te Tihi o Kahukura) is a full primary school catering for years 1 to 8. It had a roll of 188 as of July 2026. The school started in a private house in 1860 and the first classroom opened in 1861.

== Notable residents ==
- Wally Argus – New Zealand rugby international who bought a market garden in Heathcote Valley in 1949
- Bob Parker – former mayor of Christchurch was brought up here
