= Ravenscar House Museum =

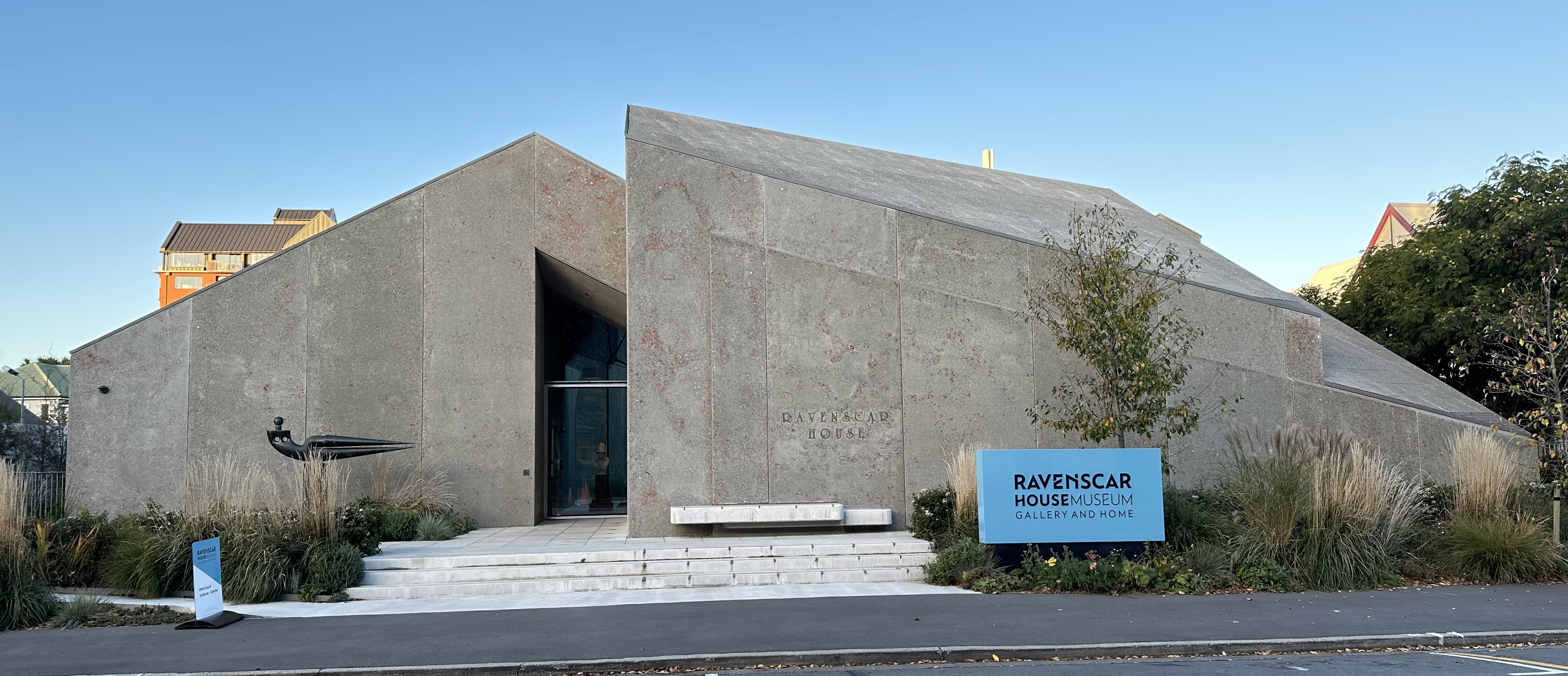
- Established: 2021
- Location: 52 Rolleston Avenue, Christchurch, New Zealand
- Coordinates: 43°31′49.5″S 172°37′40″E
- Type: Art museum
- Website: www.ravenscarhouse.com

Ravenscar House Museum is an art museum located in Christchurch, New Zealand, and operated by Canterbury Museum. It exhibits the collection of Christchurch philanthropists and art collectors Jim and Susan Wakefield, and opened to the public on 8 November 2021.

== Background ==
The Wakefields began collecting paintings and art objects in the late 1980s while living in Auckland. In 1995 they began work on a home, called Ravenscar House after a village near Susan Wakefield's birthplace, which would also hold their art collection. The home, located on Whitewash Head in the Christchurch suburb of Scarborough, was completed in 1997. The Wakefields intended to gift the house and its art to the city of Christchurch, but the house was destroyed in the 2011 Christchurch earthquake. The couple decided to use the insurance payments on the house to fund the design and build of a gallery in central Christchurch.

The Christchurch City Council carried out public consultation, and in 2015, gifted land for the construction of the museum to the Ravenscar Trust, the Wakefields' charitable trust that they had established in 1999. The land, located on Rolleston Avenue opposite Canterbury Museum, was previously used as a carpark. The building was planned to open in 2018 but due to supply problems and design complications the project was delayed. The museum was later opened in November 2021.

== Building ==
The building was designed by Patterson Associates. It features reflecting pools, vaulted ceilings, concrete panels, and extensive glass windows. The high gables were intended to align with the neo-Gothic forms of the nearby Christchurch Arts Centre and Canterbury Museum The gardens were designed by landscape architect Suzanne Turley.

== Collection ==
The collection comprises paintings, sculpture, designer furniture and antiquities, and includes works by Ralph Hotere, Colin McCahon, Frances Hodgkins, Charles Goldie, Garry Nash and Paul Dibble. Hodgkins was one of the Wakefields' favourite artists, and there are ten of her works in the collection.
