= Boulder Bay =

- Suburb
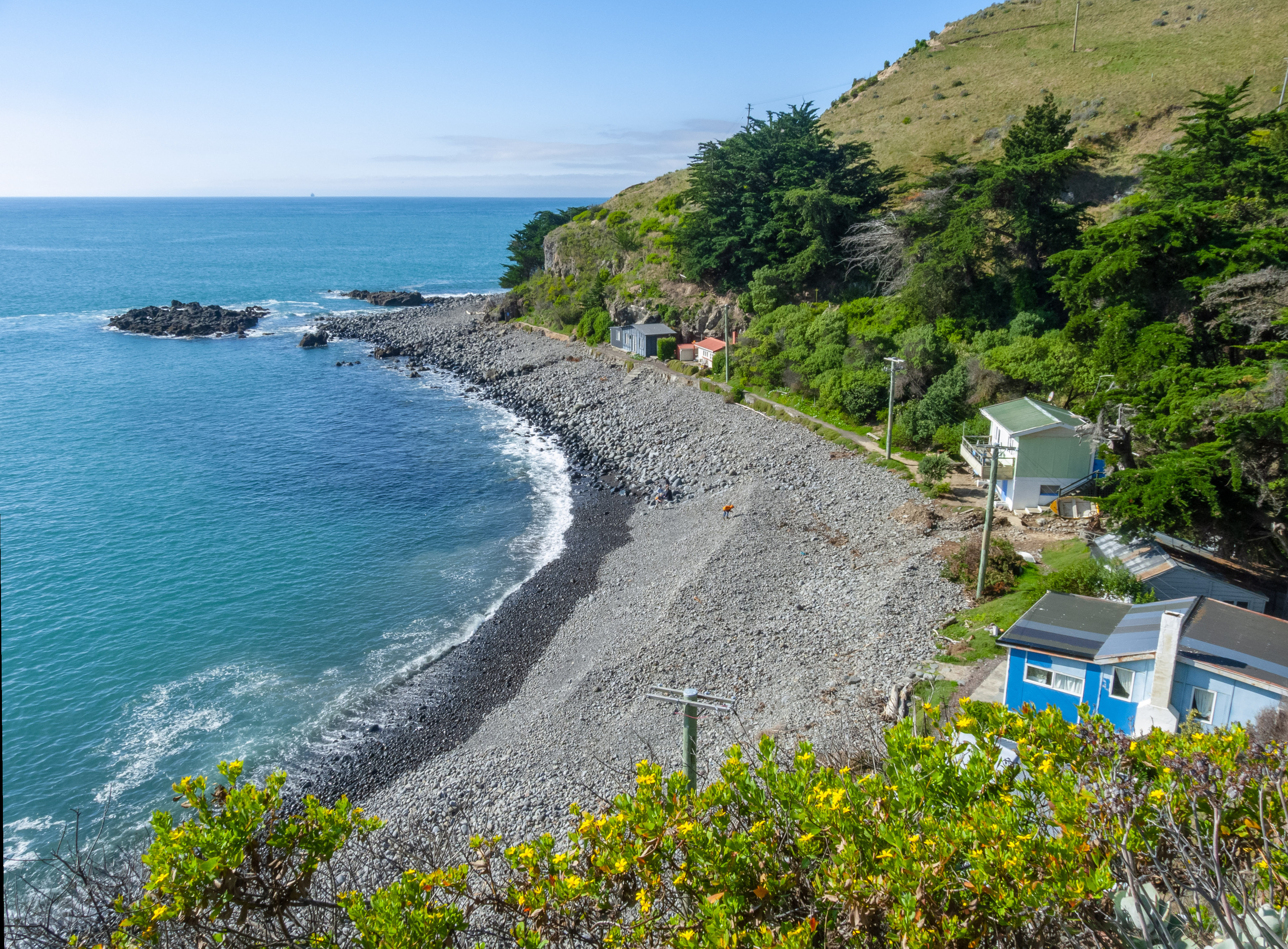
- Boulder Bay
- Interactive map of Boulder Bay
- Coordinates: 43.582°S 172.797°E
- Country: New Zealand
- City: Christchurch
- Local authority: Christchurch City Council
- Electoral ward: Heathcote

| | (Pegasus Bay) |
| Te Onepoto / Taylors Mistake | Boulder Bay |
| (Port Hills) | | Awaroa / Godley Head |

Boulder Bay is a small bay at the southeastern extremity of the city of Christchurch, New Zealand, on the north side of Awaroa / Godley Head. It is known for a collection of small vernacular holiday homes or baches.

== History ==
The Port Hills of Christchurch extending east of Te Onepoto / Taylors Mistake mostly meet the sea as rugged cliffs, which reach 120 m high at the headland Awaroa / Godley Head, but are broken by two small bays: first Harris Bay, separated from Taylors Mistake by Black Rock Point, and further to the east Boulder Bay, 1 km northwest of the Head. Boulder Bay, known in the past as Stoney Bay and Reef Bay, takes its name from the large rounded cobbles of its beach. These beaches currently have no road access, but are reached by the Godley Head Walkway, either from Taylors Mistake or Godley Head.

In 1888 the seaside suburb of Sumner was connected to the rest of Christchurch by a tramway, and it became popular for day trips and holidaymakers. Taylors Mistake and the other bays towards Godley Head then became accessible to walkers wanting to fish or camp. Holiday houses, known in New Zealand as baches, began to be built on public land along the beach front of Taylors Mistake. A road was constructed over the bluff from Sumner in 1910, and was upgraded for automobiles in 1921. This enabled the expansion of baches at Taylors Mistake, and subsequently Boulder Bay. In the Great Depression a population of unemployed men moved to Boulder Bay and set up market gardens in allotments, supplying Christchurch with daffodils and new season potatoes.

During World War II Godley Head became the military base Fort Lyttelton, and Taylors Mistake and Boulder Bay fell inside its boundaries. The army built a tank trap around the back of the Boulder Bay baches to prevent any Japanese landing from reaching the Godley Head Battery. After the war the baches were returned to their owners.

The legal status of the baches became an issue after the war, as they were private dwellings built on the public Queen's Chain, and the Council stopped granting building consents for new ones. A municipal water supply was piped in to Boulder Bay from Godley Head, and electricity arrived in 1979, along with a Christchurch City Council order that only baches with electricity and indoor toilets could stay. Over 1979–1980 approximately 17 of the baches constructed in and over caves between Taylors Mistake and Boulder Bay were demolished. Forty-five remained, and decades of legal wrangling, threats of demolition, and arguments for the historical value of the cottages ensued.

At Harris Bay to the west of Boulder Bay is a breeding area for the white-flippered subspecies of the New Zealand little penguin (Eudyptula minor). A 1997 proposal envisaged establishing a breeding colony of up to 300 pairs at Boulder Bay, where visitors could watch the birds come ashore at dusk; this plan anticipated all but the two most historic of the Boulder Bay baches would be demolished, but the reserve was never developed.

== Baches ==
At its peak Boulder Bay contained a dozen baches; nine remain today. Stone End and Rosy Morn are the oldest, built by returned servicemen from World War I, and ten more were built over the next two decades.

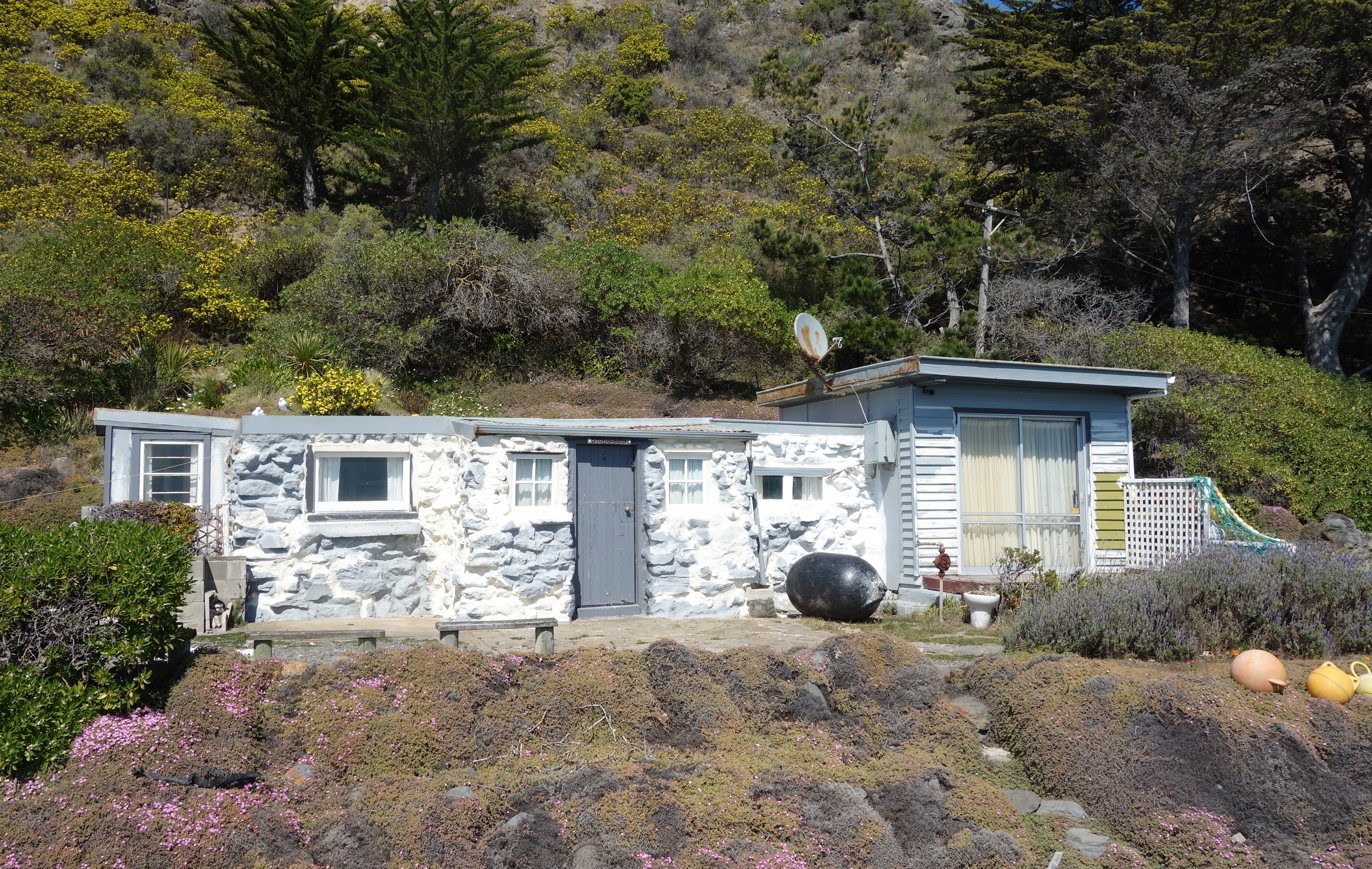
Stone End

Stone End (sometimes written Stonend), at the far eastern end of the beach, was built in the 1920s (or possibly before 1916) by Australian-born Hugh Yardley (1883–1949), a war veteran. Like its neighbour it was built of local stone and clay in a squat, weatherproof vernacular design. Yardley suffered a head wound in the war and in the late 1920s, still unmarried, he moved to Boulder Bay permanently and built Stone End. In 1931 he petitioned the Sumner Borough Council for a job, noting that he was unable to do heavy work, and became a keeper at the Godley Head Lighthouse. The lighthouse was demolished by the army base during World War II, and Yardley died at his bach at the age of 66, indirectly from his war injuries.

Yardley's niece sold the bach to the Roberts family who have kept it for five generations. They added a weatherboard bedroom to one end, and repaired the damage it suffered in the 2011 Christchurch earthquake.

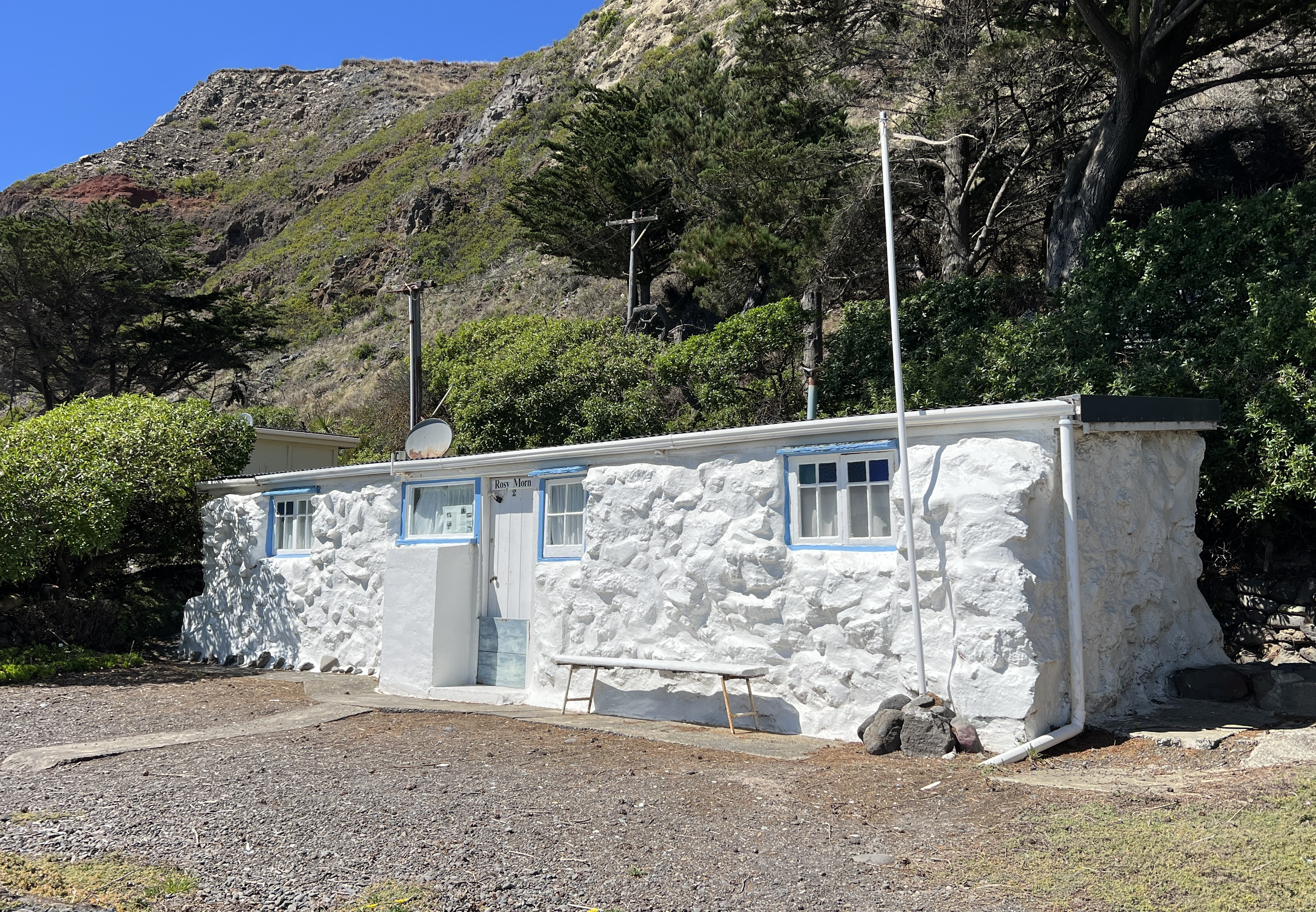
Rosy Morn

Rosy Morn, west of Stone End, was built by two St Martins residents, carpenter Eric Beumelberg or Beumelburg (1894–1954) and plasterer Wally Caldwell (1892–1973), either around 1915 before both left for World War I, or soon after the war. (The current owners claim it was built in 1908, but the builders would have been aged 14 and 12 if so; the building existed for certain by 1923.) Beumelberg and Caldwell left Christchurch in 1929 and sold the bach to builder Harry Reading (1882–1976), who renamed it Waikikuparau. He in turn sold it for £100 to Maurie Dunbar around 1957. After Dunbar's death in 1972 it was sold to Ann Pearce for $800, and bought back by Dunbar's daughter in 2008. Like Stone End it is a squat stone building with small casement windows, and suffered damage in the Christchurch earthquake but was protected from falling rocks by macrocarpa trees planted behind it by Maurie Dunbar.
