= Susan Wakefield =

New Zealand tax accountant (1942–2022)

Susan Wakefield QSO
- Born: Susan Mary Turtle; 25 November 1942; Gainsborough, Lincolnshire, England
- Died: 12 November 2022 (aged 79); Christchurch, New Zealand
- Other name: Susan Mary Lojkine
- Occupation: Tax accountant
- Spouses: Alex Lojkine (m c. 1964, divorced); Jim Wakefield (m. 1992; died 2020)
- Children: 2

Academic background
- Education: University of Canterbury
- Thesis: The defective verb in modern Russian (1968)

Susan Mary Wakefield QSO (formerly Lojkine, née Turtle; 25 November 1942 – 12 November 2022) was a New Zealand tax expert. She was also noted for her interest in art and her philanthropy, establishing Ravenscar House Museum in Christchurch with her second husband, Jim Wakefield.

== Early life and family ==
Wakefield was born Susan Mary Turtle in Gainsborough, Lincolnshire, England, on 25 November 1942, the daughter of Edna Mary Turtle (née Smith) and Walter Turtle. Both of her parents were schoolteachers. The family migrated to New Zealand in 1948, and she gained her primary education at schools in Plimmerton and Te Puke, before attending Te Puke District High School for two years and then Cashmere High School in Christchurch from 1958 to 1960. She excelled academically, achieving a total of 465 marks out of a possible 500 in her five School Certificate examination papers in 1958, believed to have been the highest in the country that year. She went on to study at the University of Canterbury, earning a senior scholarship and graduating with a Bachelor of Arts degree in May 1964. She completed a Master of Arts degree in 1964, with a thesis on early 19th-century Russian poetry, and then a PhD in 1968, both also at Canterbury. The title of her doctoral thesis was The defective verb in modern Russian.

In Christchurch in 1965, Turtle married Alex Lojkine, a lecturer in Russian at the University of Canterbury, and the couple went on to have two children before divorcing in 1989. In 1978, she became a naturalised New Zealand citizen. In May 1992, she married Jim Wakefield, an accountant, businessman, and harness-racing horse owner, breeder and administrator.

== Career ==
After her doctoral studies, Lojkine trained in accountancy, graduating with a Bachelor of Commerce degree in 1975, and worked as an accountant. In 1979, she became a partner at the international accountancy firm Peat Marwick. In 1987, she resigned and co-founded a specialist tax practice. In 1987 and 1988, she served on a consultative committee for the Inland Revenue Department to review New Zealand's international tax regime.

Wakefield held a number of directorships including director and deputy chair of the Bank of New Zealand, and chair of the Commerce Commission from 1989 to 1994. In 2000, she was one of three members of a ministerial inquiry into the New Zealand electricity industry. Wakefield was the founding chair of the University of Canterbury Foundation, a registered charitable trust that supports the university.

== Arts and philanthropy ==
Susan and Jim Wakefield bought a property in the Christchurch suburb of Scarborough in 1994 and built a new home, Ravenscar House, completed in 1997 on the site. The building housed their collection of paintings and sculpture by New Zealand artists, and both the house and art were transferred to a charitable trust in 1999, to be donated to the city of Christchurch at a later date. The building was irreparably damaged in the 2011 Christchurch earthquake, but the art collection was able to be saved. The couple then decided to establish a museum and art gallery, Ravenscar House Museum, in central Christchurch, for their collection. The museum, in its newly constructed building, was opened in 2021 and was gifted to Canterbury Museum to own and operate on behalf of the people of Christchurch.

== Honours and awards ==
Wakefield was appointed a Companion of the Queen's Service Order for public services in the 1993 New Year Honours. Also in 1993, she was awarded the New Zealand Suffrage Centennial Medal. In 2006, she was awarded an honorary doctorate in commerce by the University of Canterbury.

== Later life and death ==
Wakefield was predeceased by her husband, Jim, on 27 November 2020. She died in Christchurch almost two years later, on 12 November 2022, aged 79.
