= Muriel (fishing trawler) =

- Muriel

History
- Name: Muriel
- Owner: P Feron & Sons
- Builder: Messrs Lane & Sons, Totara North
- Fate: Ran aground 7 October 1937 at Christchurch, New Zealand

General characteristics
- Type: Fishing trawler
- Tonnage: 59 GRT; 22 NRT
- Length: 64.7 ft (19.7 m)
- Beam: 16.2 ft (4.9 m)
- Installed power: 18 hp (13 kW) engines

Muriel was a New Zealand fishing trawler that was built in 1907 by Messrs Lane & Sons of Totara North. In 1937, Muriel stranded on Sumner Bar at Christchurch, New Zealand, and was a total loss.

== Description ==
Muriel, No. 121,590, was a wooden screw steamer of 59 tons gross and 22 tons net register. The trawler had a length of 64.7 feet (19.7 m), a beam of 16.2 feet (4.9 m), and a depth of 8 feet (2.4 m). Muriel's engines were rated at 18 horsepower (13 kW). Muriel was owned by P Feron & Sons and commanded by Captain William Stephen, who had been master of the vessel since 1929.

== Newspaper articles ==
Newspaper article, Christchurch 1937

The below article was published in 1907 during the construction of Muriel:

Mr. Dolbel, of Napier, owner of the trawler Result, is to take delivery of another trawler from Messrs Lane and of Whangaroa, at an early date. The new trawler, which is a wooden vessel, is to be named the Muriel. Her principal dimensions are : Length overall, 70 ft [21.3 meters]; beam, 16 ft [4.9 meters]; and depth of hold, 8 ft [2.4 meters]. Her equipment will be a facs'milo type of the Noia Niven, with cold storage, and the gear inseparable from a trawler. The vessel is fitted with two pole masts, and has a small cabin aft.

*In the Evening Post, Wellington on 24 July 1911, page 2: A strong effort is being made to develop the trawling industry at Lyttelton (states the Christchurch Press). On Friday afternoon the steamer trawler Result arrived in the port, after a smart run of fifty-one hours from Napier. Her arrival brings the number of vessels engaged in the trawling industry at Lyttelton up to five, the fleet now comprising the Muriel, Result, Purau, Mullogh, and Pilot. The fishing grounds are off Banks Peninsula, outside of a line drawn from Port Levy rocks to Long Look Out Point, and also to the northward of Lyttelton Heads. During the winter months fish are not very plentiful, but some fairly good hauls are made even made at this part of the year. In the summer months the trawlers get some large hauls of flat fish. The financial results are not always as good as the demand for fish in Christchurch seems to warrant. The market fluctuates very considerably, and one best flat fish at times bring very poor prices.

Grey River Argus, 2 November 1910, Page 1: YOUNG MAN DROWNED.

(By : Telegraph — Per Press Association)

NAPIER, Oct- 31. John William Dephoff, a single man aged 31 years, employed on the trawler Muriel, fell overboard yesterday and was drowned. The body was recovered later.

== Sumner Bar stranding ==
At 7:20 p.m. on 7 October 1937, Muriel was returning from the Motunau fishing grounds. Two hours out from Lyttelton, on a smooth sea, Muriel ran into fog. She was moving inwards to pick up the Godley Head signal. She then struck Sumner Bar, Christchurch. One of the rudder chains carried away and she was helpless.

High tide aided the launch of the Sumner Lifeboat Institution's vessel Rescue 2. The crew were safely removed and she was abandoned until 7:00 a.m. the next morning. Muriel was later dismantled after many failed salvage attempts. A court of inquiry found that Muriel went ashore in dense fog. They considered the master's positions and ordered him to pay 10 pounds 10 towards the cost of the inquiry.

== Muriel stranding timetable ==
5:00am- Muriel leaves for Motunau Fishing Grounds

6:00am- JOURNEY TO MOTUNAU

7:00am- JOURNEY TO MOTUNAU

8:00am- JOURNEY TO MOTUNAU

9:00am- Muriel arrives at Motunau and commences trawling

10:00am- MOTUNAU TRAWLING

11:00am- MOTUNAU TRAWLING

12:00pm- MOTUNAU TRAWLING

1:00pm- MOTUNAU TRAWLING

2:00pm- MOTUNAU TRAWLING

3:00pm- MOTUNAU TRAWLING

4:00pm- William Stephen decides to head back to port 4:45pm- Weather thickened and land could not be seen

5:00pm- VOYAGE TO HOME PORT CONTINUES 5:30pm- William checks course and is on course

6:00pm- Thick fog sets in. Light southeast wind 6:30pm- Engines at full speed 6:30pm–7:00pm- Skipper expects to hear Godley Head′s fog signal. He also doubts the vessel′s position and alters course.

7:00pm- Muriel running at half speed ca. 7:20pm- Muriel strikes Sumner Bar at 3 to 4 knots

8:00pm- RESCUE ATTEMPTS CONTINUE

9:00pm- Crew abandoned ship in a lifeboat

== Sources ==
- http://paperspast.natlib.govt.nz/cgi-bin/paperspast?a=d&cl=search&d=GRA19101102.2.11&srpos=1&e=-------10--1----0trawler+muriel-all
- http://paperspast.natlib.govt.nz/cgi-bin/paperspast?a=d&cl=search&d=PBH19110314.2.81&srpos=4&e=-------10--1----0trawler+muriel-all
- http://paperspast.natlib.govt.nz/cgi-bin/paperspast?a=d&cl=search&d=HNS19101101.2.80&srpos=5&e=-------10--1----0trawler+muriel-all
- http://paperspast.natlib.govt.nz/cgi-bin/paperspast?a=d&cl=search&d=PBH19170511.2.51&srpos=7&e=-------10--1----0trawler+muriel-all
- www.nzmaritimeindex.org.nz/ixvesselsM.htm
