= Scarborough, New Zealand =

Scarborough
- Suburb
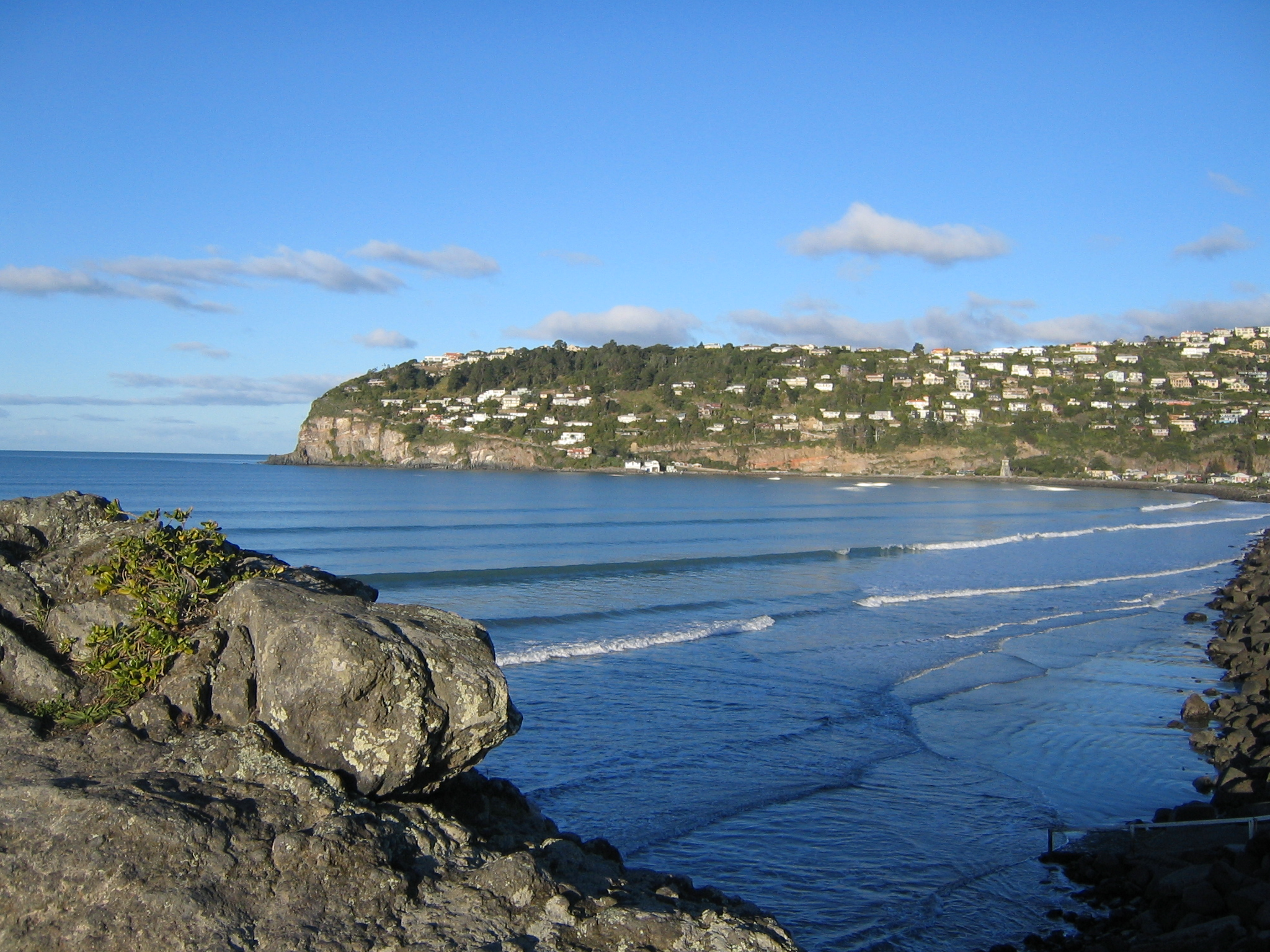
- Scarborough seen from Sumner beach; Nicholson Park is the area to the left just below the ridgeline
- Interactive map of Scarborough
- Coordinates: 43°34′28″S 172°46′19″E
- Country: New Zealand
- City: Christchurch
- Local authority: Christchurch City Council
- Electoral ward: Heathcote

Area
  - Land: 117 ha (290 acres)

Population (2023 Census)
  - Total: 729
  - Density: 623/km^{2} (1,610/sq mi)

		(Pegasus Bay)
Sumner, New Zealand	Scarborough
Port Hills	Te Onepoto / Taylors Mistake

Scarborough is a hillside suburb above Sumner in Christchurch, New Zealand.

Scarborough is located between Sumner and Te Onepoto / Taylors Mistake. It was named for the seaside resort in North Yorkshire, England. The first European owner of most of the land was Major Alfred Hornbrook, whose Mount Pleasant run stretched as far east as Godley Head. A small land parcel of 25 acres (10 ha) near present-day Nicholson Park belonged to Charles Church Haslewood, who died in May 1858 when his hunting gun discharged while he looked down the barrel.

The land was purchased by R. M. Morten, and after his death, his sons had Scarborough subdivided into 65 sections by July 1911. The first person who built in the area was Donald Paterson, a civil engineer. Patterson purchased all the land in the triangle formed by Scarborough Road and Flowers Track, and had it resurveyed into 41 sections, twice the number of the Morten brother survey.

Nicholson Park has views from a number of vantage points in this 4 hectares (0.040 km^{2}) location, with views of Sumner and the Canterbury coastline. Flowers Track can be descended from here, and it was the main start point of the walking track along the cliff tops that formed an early connection between Sumner and Taylors Mistake. The track went past Whitewash Head and Sumner Head; the former name was first recorded by Thomas Potts in his book Out in the Open in 1882 and it is presumed that it refers to the white appearance from shag droppings. The walkway was destroyed in the two earthquakes that hit on 13 June 2011; the first had its epicentre in Taylor's Mistake, and the second had its epicentre in Sumner. Much of the cliff faces collapsed into the sea below.

Some of the land near the cliffs has been red zoned and purchased by the Canterbury Earthquake Recovery Authority. Houses on those properties are to be demolished, and the land is so unstable that drones are used to survey the land for establishing the best demolition method.

== Demographics ==
Scarborough is part of the Sumner statistical area.

Historical population
Year	Pop.	±% p.a.
2006	783	—
2013	702	−1.55%
2018	744	+1.17%
2023	729	−0.41%

Scarborough, including Te Onepoto / Taylors Mistake, covers 1.17 km^{2} (0.45 sq mi). It had a population of 729 in the 2023 New Zealand census, a decrease of 15 people (−2.0%) since the 2018 census, and an increase of 27 people (3.8%) since the 2013 census. There were 363 males, 366 females, and 3 people of other genders in 300 dwellings. 3.3% of people identified as LGBTIQ+. There were 75 people (10.3%) aged under 15 years, 105 (14.4%) aged 15 to 29, 372 (51.0%) aged 30 to 64, and 177 (24.3%) aged 65 or older.

People could identify as more than one ethnicity. The results were 95.9% European (Pākehā); 4.9% Māori; 0.4% Pasifika; 2.5% Asian; 1.2% Middle Eastern, Latin American and African New Zealanders (MELAA); and 1.6% other, which includes people giving their ethnicity as "New Zealander". English was spoken by 98.4%, Māori by 1.2%, Samoan by 0.4%, and other languages by 11.1%. No language could be spoken by 0.8% (e.g. too young to talk). New Zealand Sign Language was known by 0.8%. The percentage of people born overseas was 25.1, compared with 28.8% nationally.

Religious affiliations were 30.9% Christian, 0.8% Hindu, 0.4% Islam, and 0.8% other religions. People who answered that they had no religion were 58.4%, and 6.6% of people did not answer the census question.

Of those at least 15 years old, 300 (45.9%) people had a bachelor's or higher degree, 279 (42.7%) had a post-high school certificate or diploma, and 78 (11.9%) people exclusively held high school qualifications. 189 people (28.9%) earned over $100,000 compared to 12.1% nationally. The employment status of those at least 15 was 309 (47.2%) full-time, 123 (18.8%) part-time, and 9 (1.4%) unemployed.

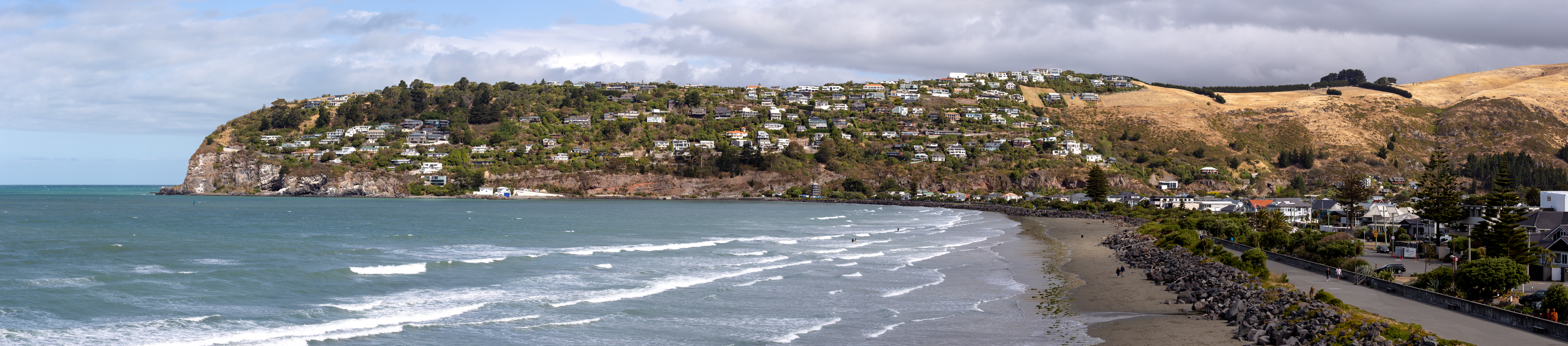
Panoramic view of Scarborough from Sumner Beach
