= William Orange (clergyman) =

New Zealand Anglican clergyman (1889–1966)

William Alfred Orange
- Born: 9 August 1889; Woolston, Christchurch, New Zealand
- Died: 28 June 1966 (aged 76); Christchurch, New Zealand
- Education: Christchurch Normal School
- Alma mater: Canterbury College
- Occupation: Clergyman

William Alfred Orange (9 August 1889 – 28 June 1966) was a New Zealand Anglican clergyman. He was a leader of the Evangelical movement in New Zealand.

== Early life ==
Orange was born on 9 August 1889 in Woolston, Christchurch, New Zealand, the second of eleven children of Albert Edward Orange, a wool-classer, and his wife, Helen Brenda Hinkley, a nurse. He grew up in Christchurch, where he attended Christchurch Normal School, and then in Kaikōura.

== Career ==
After an unhappy time working in shops and serving briefly in the army at Featherston, Orange studied for the ministry at Canterbury College. He completed his studies and was ordained priest in 1923, was acting vicar of Fendalton (1923–1924) and then in 1924 vicar of Waikari. He developed an increasingly fundamentalist, evangelical theology.

Orange was vicar of Sumner from 1930 to 1946, working with Sumner School for Deaf Children and expanding the Evangelical Union at Canterbury College, as well as the Crusader Movement of New Zealand, Scripture Union and the Inter-Varsity Fellowship of Evangelical Unions. It was during this time that he became a leader of the Evangelical movement in New Zealand.

In 1946 he was appointed the first warden of an evangelical conference centre, Tyndale House. He left the following year after disagreement with its founder. He went to ChristChurch Cathedral as acting precentor and took that role in 1949. He was an honorary canon of the cathedral from 1951. For the six years from 1954 to 1960, he was chaplain of Cathedral Grammar School, which is closely connected to the cathedral.

== Later life ==
Upon his retirement in 1963, he became the first warden of Latimer House, then a new evangelical library and study centre connected to College House at the University of Canterbury, which had just moved from the Christchurch Central City to the suburb of Ilam. He died at Christchurch on 28 June 1966, leaving his sermon manuscripts and most of his library's 15,000 volumes to Latimer House. Orange's work of promoting evangelical churchmanship is continued by the Latimer Fellowship.
