= Whitewash Head =

Coordinates: 43°34′9.72″S 172°46′31.72″E

Whitewash Head is the name of the seaward clifftop on Scarborough Hill in Christchurch, Canterbury, New Zealand. Taylors Mistake Walkway between Sumner and Taylors Mistake goes past Whitewash Head. There is a spotted shag colony in the cliff below Whitewash Head.
