= Taylors Mistake =

Te Onepoto / Taylors Mistake
- Suburb
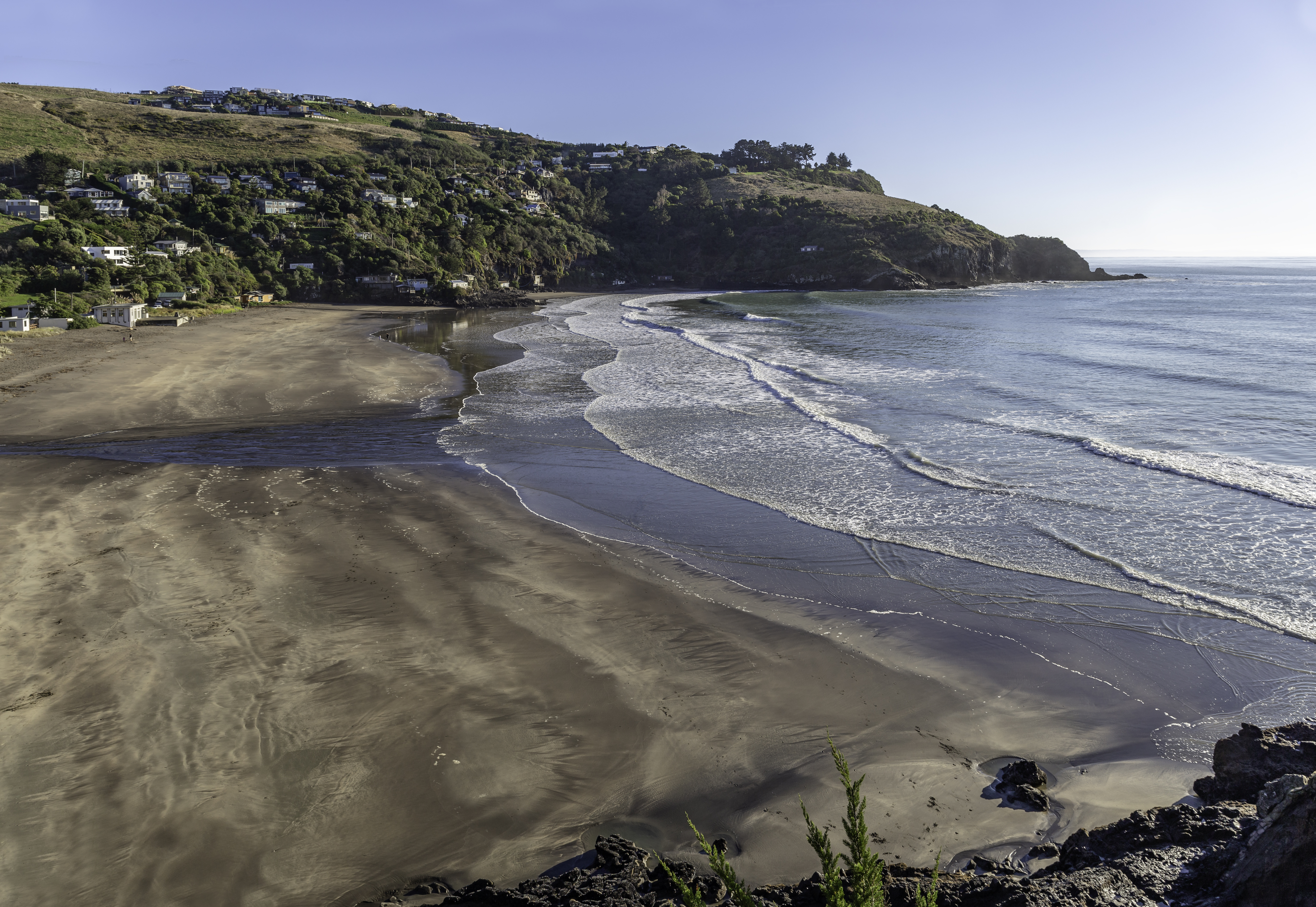
- The beach at Te Onepoto / Taylors Mistake
- Interactive map of Te Onepoto / Taylors Mistake
- Coordinates: 43.5833°S 172.7755°E
- Country: New Zealand
- City: Christchurch
- Local authority: Christchurch City Council
- Electoral ward: Heathcote

Area
  - Land: 30 ha (74 acres)

Population (2023 Census)
  - Total: 174
  - Density: 580/km^{2} (1,500/sq mi)

Scarborough		(Pegasus Bay)
Sumner	Te Onepoto
(Port Hills)		(Awaroa / Godley Head)

Te Onepoto / Taylors Mistake is an area in New Zealand's South Island, at the southeastern extremity of the city of Christchurch Taylors Mistake is a bay adjacent to the locality, on the north side of Awaroa / Godley Head, on the northern edge of Banks Peninsula.

== Toponymy ==
The name Te Onepoto / Taylors Mistake is one of New Zealand's dual placenames. The Māori portion, Te Onepoto, means short or little beach. For the English portion, the Lyttelton Times in 1865 said it was "originally called Vincent's Bay, and more recently Taylor's Mistake." The name "Taylor's Mistake" originated from an incident involving a man named Edward Taylor, who was the first European settler to own land in the area. The story goes that in the mid-19th century, Edward Taylor was surveying the coastline for potential land to purchase. He mistook the bay near what is now known as Taylors Mistake for the nearby Pigeon Bay, which he intended to buy. However, upon realizing his mistake, he continued to call the area "Taylor's Mistake." Over time, the name stuck, and it became the official name for the bay and surrounding area.

== Baches ==
There are almost 50 small century-old seaside baches remaining on the coastal strip between Hobsons Bay to the north, and Boulder Bay to the south. Some are cave baches, with Whare Moki being considered the oldest surviving example in New Zealand. Most of the baches were, in 1995 or 2016, recognised as heritage assets by either Heritage NZ or by the Christchurch City Council under the resource management act. The baches appear in vernacular works of art and poetry, including a 1956 painting by Bill Sutton (artist) held at the Christchurch Art Gallery Four dilapidated baches were demolished by Christchurch City Council in late February / early March 2026 with their owners' consent.

== Beach ==
The beach is popular with swimmers and surfers, and a livecam operated by some of the bach-holders allows conditions to be checked in advance. The Taylors Mistake Surf Life Saving Club was established at the beach, by bach-holders and others, in 1916. During World War II, hills above the beach were fortified with two machine gun posts, to guard the Godley Head coastal defence battery.

== Demographics ==
Taylors Mistake, including a small portion of Scarborough which is in the same census area, covers 0.30 km^{2} (0.12 sq mi). It is included in the full Scarborough demographics, and is also part of the Sumner statistical area.

Historical population
Year	Pop.	±% p.a.
2006	222	—
2013	192	−2.05%
2018	183	−0.96%
2023	174	−1.00%

Taylors Mistake had a population of 174 in the 2023 New Zealand census, a decrease of 9 people (−4.9%) since the 2018 census, and a decrease of 18 people (−9.4%) since the 2013 census. There were 81 males and 93 females in 69 dwellings. 3.4% of people identified as LGBTIQ+. The median age was 52.0 years (compared with 38.1 years nationally). There were 21 people (12.1%) aged under 15 years, 21 (12.1%) aged 15 to 29, 96 (55.2%) aged 30 to 64, and 33 (19.0%) aged 65 or older.

People could identify as more than one ethnicity. The results were 98.3% European (Pākehā), and 3.4% Māori. English was spoken by 98.3%, and other languages by 8.6%. New Zealand Sign Language was known by 1.7%. The percentage of people born overseas was 25.9, compared with 28.8% nationally.

The sole religious affiliation given was 32.8% Christian. People who answered that they had no religion were 58.6%, and 5.2% of people did not answer the census question.

Of those at least 15 years old, 75 (49.0%) people had a bachelor's or higher degree, 60 (39.2%) had a post-high school certificate or diploma, and 15 (9.8%) people exclusively held high school qualifications. The median income was $51,800, compared with $41,500 nationally. 42 people (27.5%) earned over $100,000 compared to 12.1% nationally. The employment status of those at least 15 was 72 (47.1%) full-time, 21 (13.7%) part-time, and 3 (2.0%) unemployed.
