= Sumner, New Zealand =

Suburb of Christchurch, New Zealand

Sumner
- Suburb
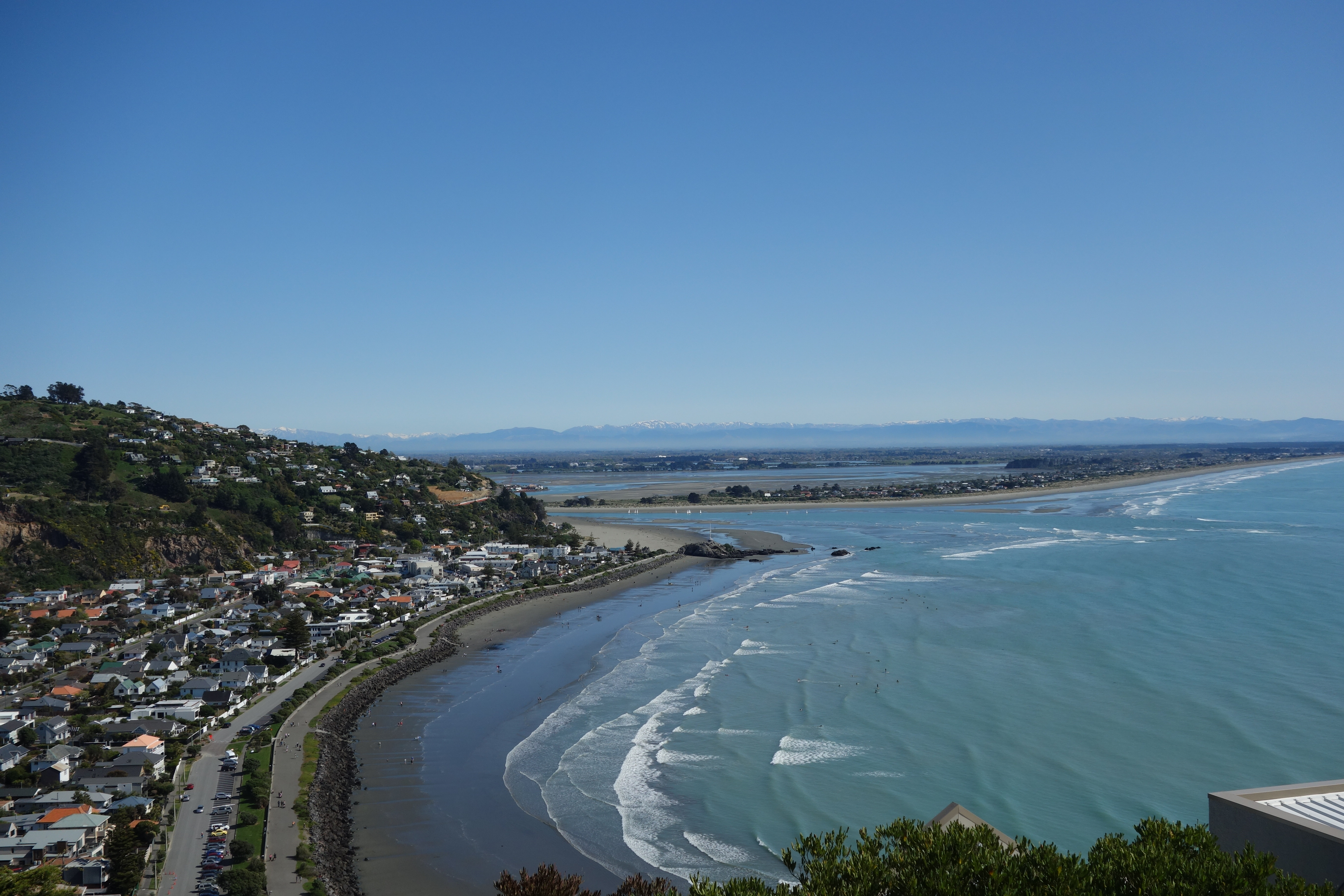
- Looking down on Sumner (left) from Scarborough
- Interactive map of Sumner
- Coordinates: 43.57144°S 172.76447°E
- Country: New Zealand
- City: Christchurch
- Local authority: Christchurch City Council
- Electoral ward: Heathcote
- Community board: Waihoro Spreydon-Cashmere-Heathcote

Area
  - Land: 264 ha (650 acres)

Population (June 2025)
  - Total: 3,490
  - Density: 1,320/km^{2} (3,420/sq mi)

Clifton		(Pegasus Bay)
Richmond Hill	Sumner	Scarborough
	Port Hills	Te Onepoto / Taylors Mistake

Sumner is a coastal seaside suburb of Christchurch, New Zealand, and was surveyed and named in 1849 in honour of John Bird Sumner, the newly appointed Archbishop of Canterbury and president of the Canterbury Association. Originally a separate borough, it was later amalgamated with the city of Christchurch as communications improved and the economies of scale made small-town boroughs uneconomic to operate.

== Toponymy ==
Captain Joseph Thomas named the settlement for Bishop John Bird Sumner, one of the leading members of the Canterbury Association.

The Ngāi Tahu name for the beach between Cave Rock (Tuawera) and Scarborough is Matuku Tako Tako. This name has been used by both the state primary school and the city libraries.

A. W. Reed gives the Māori name for the area as Ohikaparuparu ("o" means place of; "hika" means rubbing, kindling, or planting; "paruparu" means dirt, deeply laden, or a preparation of fermented cockles). However, J. F Menzies indicates this name is associated with a settlement on the shores of the estuary between Redcliffs and Mt Pleasant and prefers an alternative translation of "The place where sticks were rubbed together to make a fire with which to cook cockles in preparation for a journey". Andersen places this name on the beach at the mouth of the estuary, near Shag Rock (Rapanui). James Cowan, retelling Sir Maui Pomare, indicates this name applies to the estuary shallows and means "fall in the mud".

== History ==
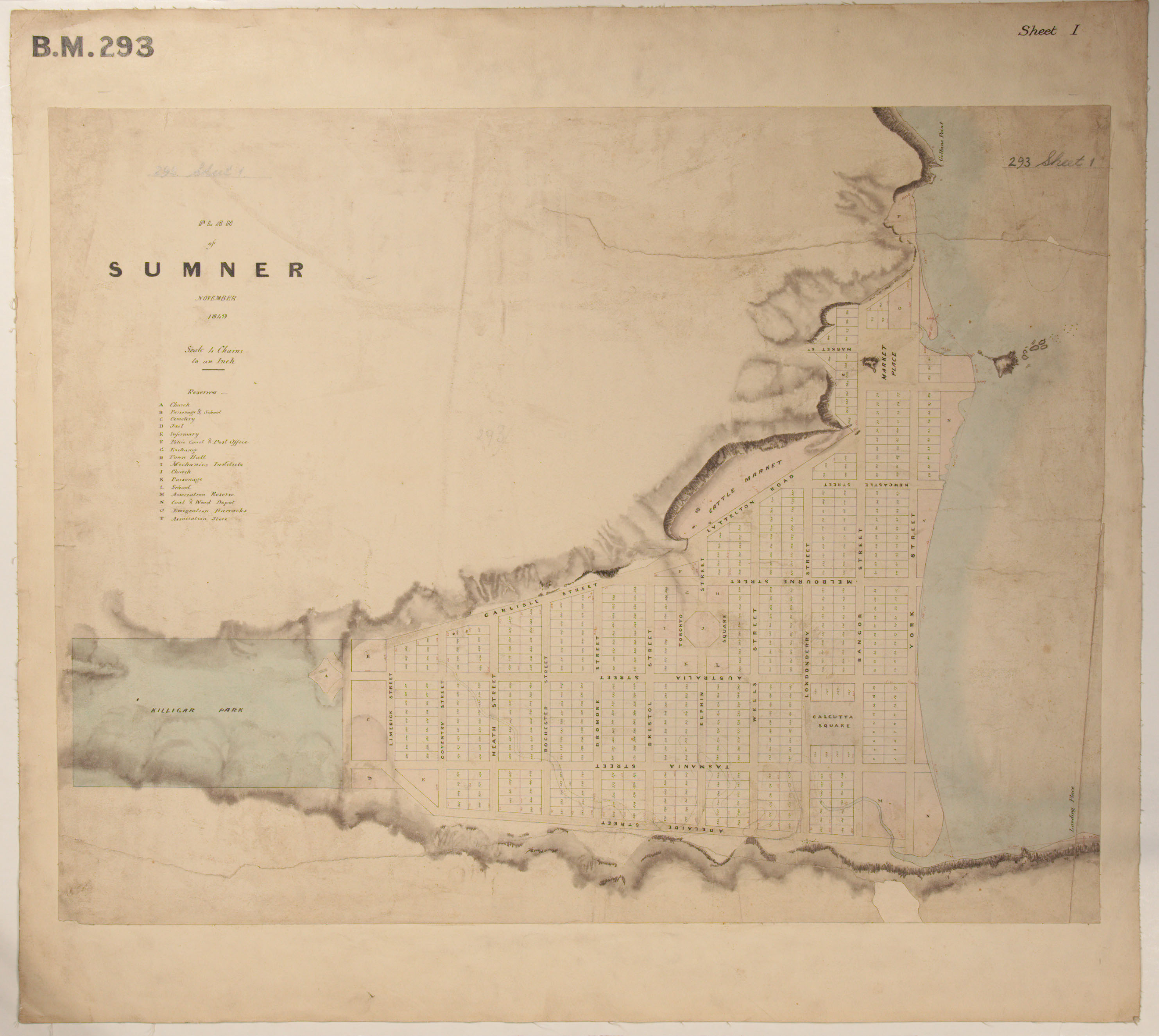
Plan of Sumner, November 1849, by Edward Jollie

Sumner was surveyed in 1849 by Edward Jollie for Captain Joseph Thomas, the advanced agent of the Canterbury Association. Jollie's map of November 1849 showed 527 sections and numerous reserves and provisions for churches, schools, cemeteries, town hall, emigration barracks and other town amenities. However, his plans were abandoned through lack of funds and a new survey on which Sumner is based was carried out in 1860.

The first European to carry out work in Sumner is believed to be Charles Crawford, a whaleboat owner, who transported materials from Port Cooper, now Lyttelton, under contract to build the headquarters and storeroom for Captain Thomas. Sumner was settled in late 1849 or early 1850 by work crews building the road to Lyttelton, Sumner is thus one of the oldest European settlements in the Christchurch area. The Day family was the first to settle permanently in Sumner, followed by Edward Dobson and his family.

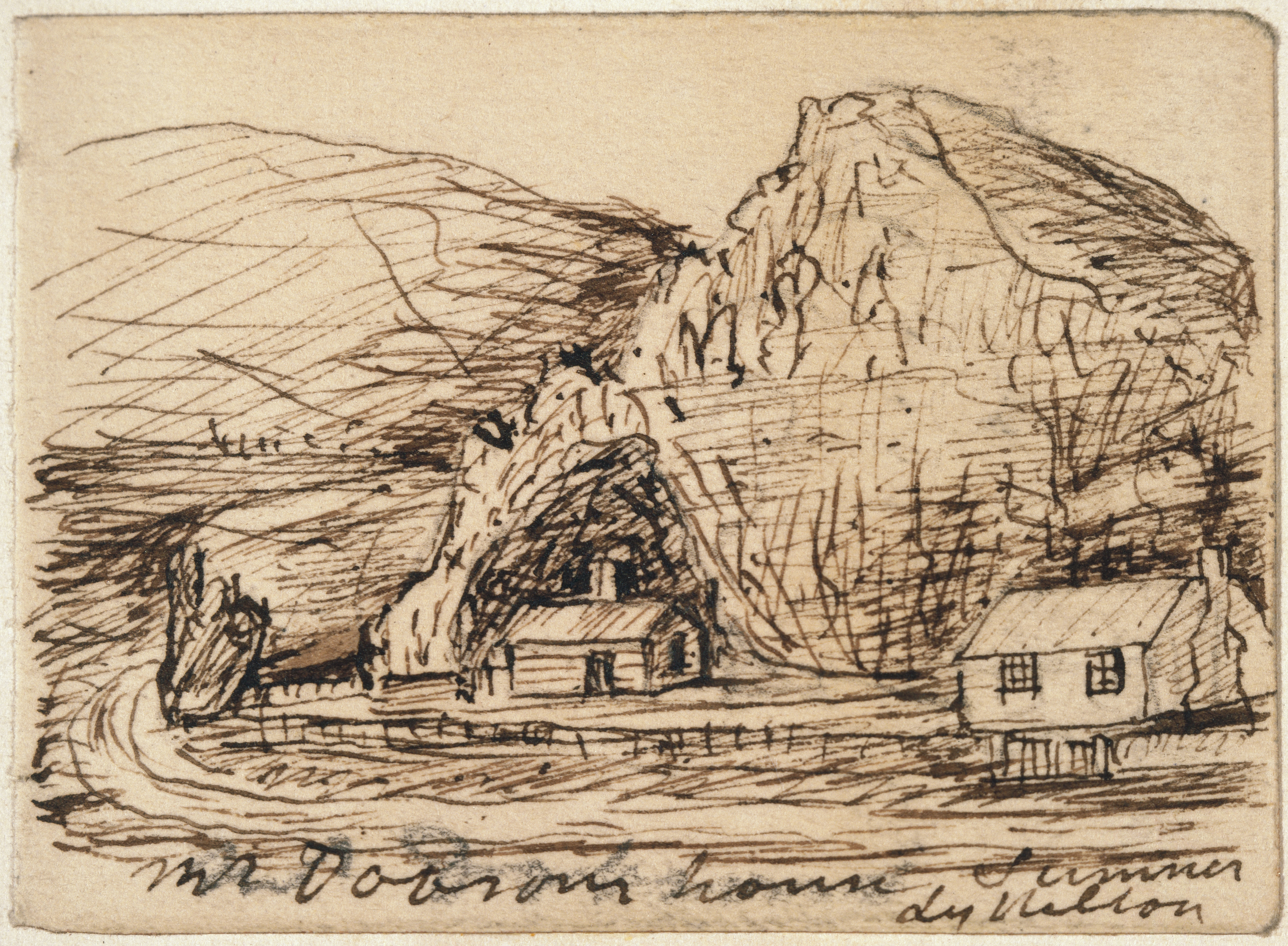
Dobson's house, on left (pencil sketch, 1865)

Sumner had its first shop early in 1870, and its proprietor, S. E. Horneman, was postmaster from 1873 until 1876.

In 1872, it came under the control of the Heathcote Road District. When provincial councils were disestablished in 1876 and replaced with counties, Sumner had a second parent body, the Selwyn County, added to the continuing road board. In 1883, Sumner was constituted as a town district and was run by a board of five elected commissioners. The board elected its own chairmen, and the two people who filled that role were C. L. Wiggins (March 1883 – September 1884) and J. M. Wheeler (September 1884 – June 1891). On 1 June 1891, Sumner was proclaimed a borough. Mayoral elections were held on 27 June, and the last chairman was elected the first Mayor of Sumner.

In 1885 the Harbour Board granted the concession to build a bath at the East end of Sumner beach. S. L. Bell enclosed some of the sea, and built dressing sheds and a tea shop. The bathing pool was a great attraction but every year terrific storms would batter the bath and gradually dump fine sand in it. Eventually a flood filled the bath with clay and silt from the hills forcing its closure.

In 1912 Sumner established its own gasworks and electricity was connected in 1918. The Anglican evangelical leader William Orange was vicar of Sumner from 1930 to 1945. In 1945 Sumner was annexed by Christchurch City.

On 22 February 2011, Sumner was hit by the Christchurch earthquake, which destroyed or made uninhabitable a large number of the local houses and commercial buildings. On 13 June the same year, Sumner was hit by another earthquake of almost the same magnitude as the February event. These two earthquakes caused many of Sumner's iconic cliffs to collapse, and many areas to be cordoned off with both traditional fences and shipping containers.

== Geography ==
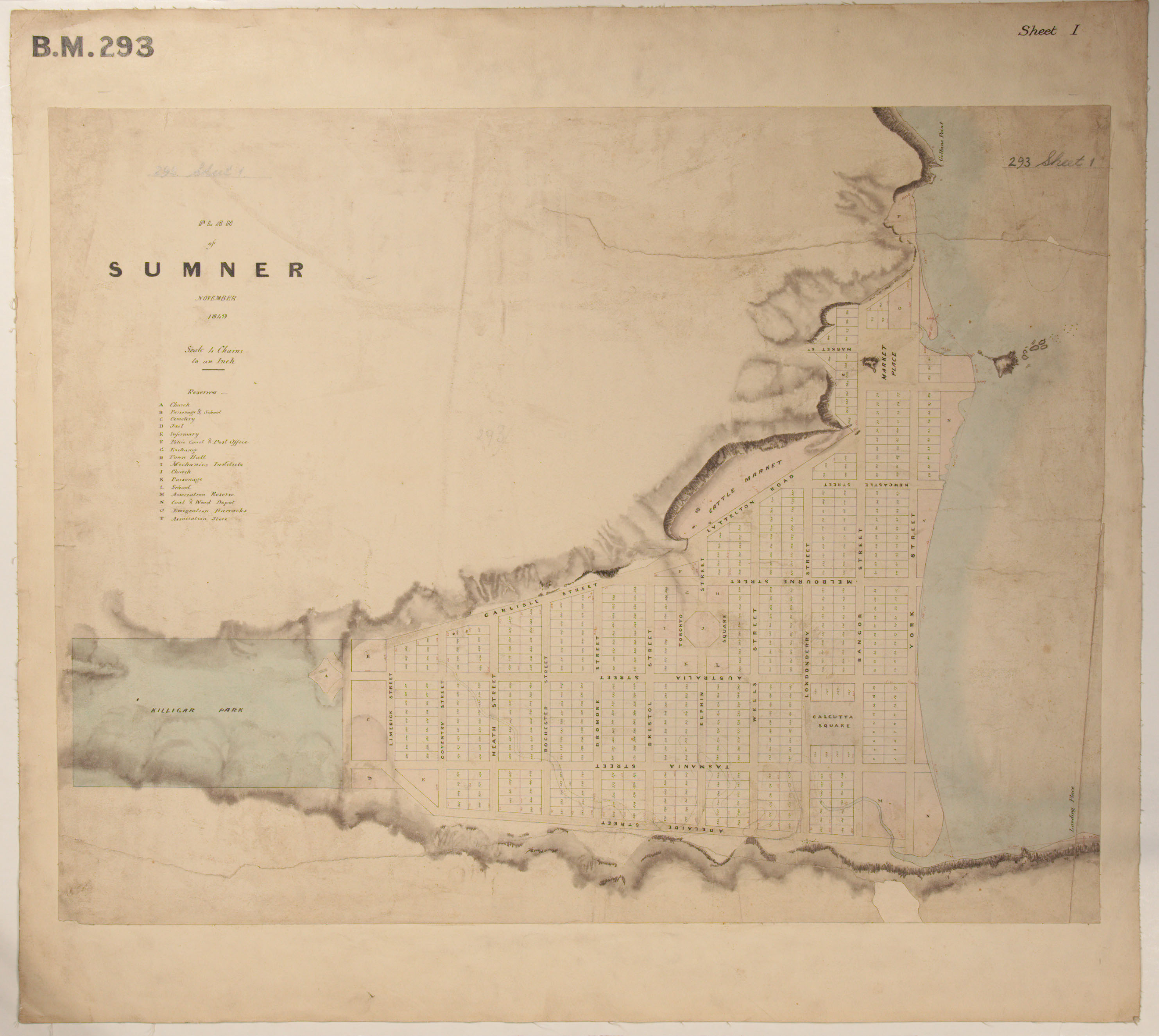
Black Map of Sumner township from November 1849, produced by Edward Jollie for chief surveyor Joseph Thomas

Sumner is nestled in a coastal valley separated from the adjacent city suburbs by rugged volcanic hill ridges that end in cliffs that descend to the sea shore in places. Sumner Bay is the first bay on the northern side of Banks Peninsula and faces Pegasus Bay and the Pacific Ocean.

Because of its ocean exposure, a high surf can form in some swell conditions. The beach is gently sloping, with fine grey sand. It is a popular surf beach for these reasons.

Sand dunes have filled the river valley behind the beach. This has made housing construction relatively easy, although flooding at the head of the valley has been a problem in the past due to the reverse slope caused by the sand dunes filling the front of the valley. This has been addressed by a flood drain.

A sea wall and wide esplanade have been built along the length of the beach to prevent coastal erosion.

The rocky volcanic outcrop of Cave Rock, or Tuawera dominates the beach. Until the mid-1860s, this feature was known by Europeans as Cass Rock, after the surveyor Thomas Cass. There are other rocky outcrops in the area and the volcanic nature of the geology is readily apparent from several of the exposed cliffs around the valley.

Shag Rock, or Rapanui, is another large volcanic outcrop at the western end of the beach and sits at the mouth of the Estuary formed by the Avon and Heathcote rivers. This landmark was shattered by the Christchurch earthquakes in 2011, which reduced the iconic rock to a pile of boulders.

=== Sumner bar ===
The Sumner Bar is a sand bar where the estuary meets the sea and is notoriously dangerous to cross. The outlet of the Avon Heathcote Estuary, at the western end of the beach, forms the Sumner bar off shore of Cave Rock. The Sumner bar presents a major hazard to shipping, while the fast currents, strong rips and undertows in the area can be a danger to swimmers.

In December 1854, Commander Byron Drury, in HMS Pandora, surveyed the Sumner Bay, including the bar and mouth of the Avon-Heathcote Estuary for the Canterbury Provincial Council. Drury wrote a report and produced a detailed chart of the area, with soundings. Commander Drury's 1854 chart locates several buildings on shore, including a store at the foot of the hill in Clifton Bay, Day's house, which is set well back from the foreshore on a bend in the road, as it turns away from the foot of Clifton hill, and Dobson's house, which is shown at end of the spur at the foot of Richmond Hill. Compared to a modern-day map, the Day's house would have been near the corner at the top end of Nayland Street while Dobson's house would be near the intersection of Nayland Street and Wakefield Avenue.

The earliest recorded accident crossing the Sumner Bar occurred in May 1845 when a whaleboat capsized, without loss of life. The earliest recorded loss of life was in 1851 when a dinghy capsizes and two men aboard drowned. The cutter Hawk broke up crossing the Sumner Bar in rough weather at the end of June 1851 and wrecked on the beach, though the crew survived, the cargo was plundered. Fifteen more vessels were recorded as stranding on the bar between 1851 and 1867, with 7 being total losses.

One regular vessel crossing the bar in the early days was the Mullogh, New Zealand's first iron hulled steamer. On 25 August 1865 the Mullogh ran onto Cave Rock, Sumner, in violent surf. Her cargo of liquor created keen interest on the beach. George Holmes of Pigeon Bay, the contractor for the Lyttelton Rail Tunnel, then bought the ship, refitted and used her until 1869.

The NZ Trawler Muriel was stranded on Sumner Beach in 1937 and was a total loss and had to be dismantled where she lay.

== Community ==
Sumner is a focal point for the adjacent suburbs of Clifton, Richmond Hill and Scarborough. In earlier times, residents of those suburbs would often have been considered to be living in Sumner, because these suburbs have road access via Sumner or depend on services available in Sumner. Before 1945, Sumner was a separate borough from Christchurch City. Also, before seven-digit landline telephone numbering was implemented in Christchurch (late 1980s or early 1990s), telephone subscribers in these suburbs would have had a four-digit Sumner telephone exchange number.

== Demographics ==
The statistical area of Sumner, which includes Scarborough and Te Onepoto / Taylors Mistake, covers 2.64 km^{2} (1.02 sq mi). It had an estimated population of 3,490 as of June 2025, with a population density of 1,322 people per km^{2}.

Historical population
Year	Pop.	±% p.a.
2006	3,768	—
2013	3,483	−1.12%
2018	3,519	+0.21%
2023	3,411	−0.62%

Sumner had a population of 3,411 in the 2023 New Zealand census, a decrease of 108 people (−3.1%) since the 2018 census, and a decrease of 72 people (−2.1%) since the 2013 census. There were 1,665 males, 1,734 females, and 9 people of other genders in 1,371 dwellings. 2.8% of people identified as LGBTIQ+. The median age was 46.8 years (compared with 38.1 years nationally). There were 552 people (16.2%) aged under 15 years, 531 (15.6%) aged 15 to 29, 1,653 (48.5%) aged 30 to 64, and 675 (19.8%) aged 65 or older.

People could identify as more than one ethnicity. The results were 95.6% European (Pākehā); 5.8% Māori; 1.1% Pasifika; 2.6% Asian; 1.4% Middle Eastern, Latin American and African New Zealanders (MELAA); and 2.3% other, which includes people giving their ethnicity as "New Zealander". English was spoken by 98.4%, Māori by 1.1%, Samoan by 0.4%, and other languages by 11.8%. No language could be spoken by 1.2% (e.g. too young to talk). New Zealand Sign Language was known by 0.6%. The percentage of people born overseas was 27.6, compared with 28.8% nationally.

Religious affiliations were 29.1% Christian, 0.2% Hindu, 0.1% Islam, 0.1% Māori religious beliefs, 0.5% Buddhist, 0.4% New Age, 0.2% Jewish, and 1.1% other religions. People who answered that they had no religion were 61.8%, and 6.8% of people did not answer the census question.

Of those at least 15 years old, 1,215 (42.5%) people had a bachelor's or higher degree, 1,263 (44.2%) had a post-high school certificate or diploma, and 378 (13.2%) people exclusively held high school qualifications. The median income was $50,500, compared with $41,500 nationally. 666 people (23.3%) earned over $100,000 compared to 12.1% nationally. The employment status of those at least 15 was 1,362 (47.6%) full-time, 558 (19.5%) part-time, and 48 (1.7%) unemployed.

== Government ==
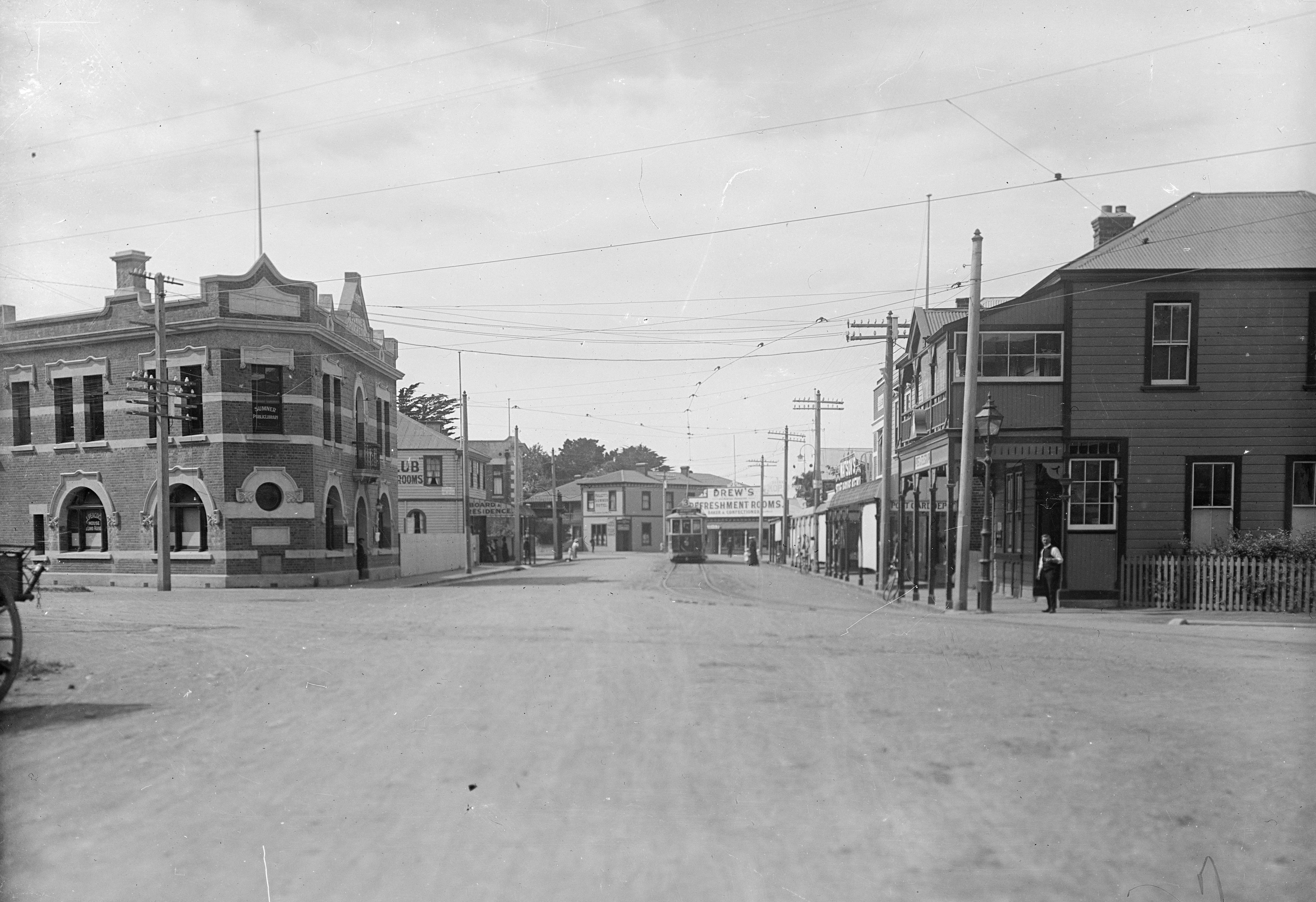
Sumner town centre and the Sumner Tram, ca 1910

The Canterbury Association initially administered Sumner, with the valley being surveyed by Edward Jollie in 1849 and he drew up a street plan in November of that year. However, the planned settlement was rejected by Godley and the land was not subdivided. When the first allocation of rural sections was made public in February 1851, rural section No.2 was allocated to Felix Wakefield. This section was bounded in the North by a road along the coast, in the West by the road between Christchurch and Lyttelton, by an accommodation road against the hillside in the East and another accommodation road across the valley in the South. The street names on the 1850 settlement plan were not used and Wakefield subdivided and leased or sold off parts of this rural section in smaller lots to create a settlement he called Wakefield Township.

After the Canterbury Association was disestablished, Sumner came under the control of the Canterbury Provincial Council. This lasted until the provinces were disestablished in 1876 and county councils were established instead. Sumner came under the jurisdiction of the Selwyn County Council initially.

A Town Board was established during the 1870s.

By the end of the 1880s Sumner had become a borough and administered the still mostly rural suburbs east of Ferrymead, including Mount Pleasant, Redcliffs, Moncks Bay, Clifton and Richmond Hill as well as the mostly undeveloped land between Scarborough and Godley Head, including Taylors Mistake.

By the 1940s, small town boroughs were becoming uneconomic and Sumner was merged with Christchurch city area.

Sumner is currently administered by the Christchurch City Council.

== Culture and heritage ==
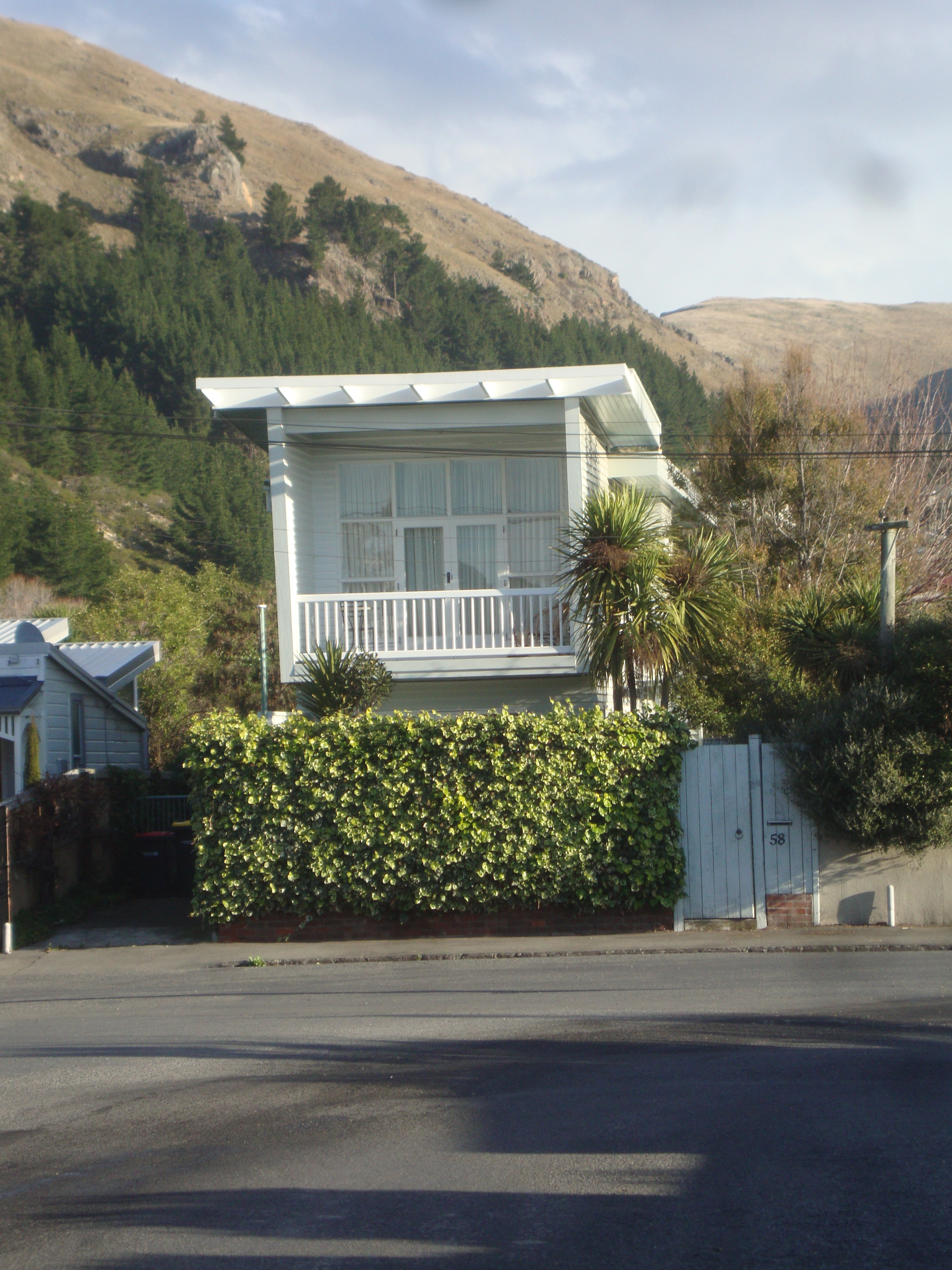
Pascoe House (2012)

=== Architecture ===
The Pascoe House in Colenso Street is a category II historic place and an early example of a two story private dwelling in the Post War Modern Domestic style of the period between 1940 and 1960. It was designed by architect Paul Pascoe and constructed in 1948 as his own private home.

== Transport ==
The need for a convenient route between the Port at Lyttelton and the plains settlement of Christchurch was quickly recognised by Captain Thomas, Chief Surveyor for the Canterbury Association. Settlement of flat land at Sumner was also planned at an early stage.

=== By sea ===
The Sumner Bar is a notable navigation hazard, though it can be crossed safely in the right wind, tide and sea conditions. However, with an exposed coast and no safe anchorage immediately off-shore, good seamanship is also required.

There is a small boat harbour, protected by a substantial breakwater, at the south-eastern end of Sumner Bay, below Scarborough. There is a slipway for launching small boats from a trailer, as well as the lifeboat station. However, the area has a tendency to silt up, as it is still exposed to wind and sea.

In 1849, this area was known as Sumner Nook and was the only comparatively safe place in the bay for landing from a boat, because of a lagoon formed by a small stream running into the sea in this area. But, with Sumner Bay open to the Pacific Ocean, there was no nearby safe anchorage for larger ships, short of Lyttelton Harbour, about 8 nautical miles away by sea. An early proposal, by Captain Thomas, was to builds a jetty here to unload ships and transport the cargo by tramway to the estuary beyond Shag Rock, to avoid ships having to cross the Sumner Bar, but a land option was chosen instead.

=== By land ===
A convenient land route between Lyttelton to Christchurch has been a requirement from the beginning of Canterbury settlement. While rail and road tunnels between Lyttelton to Christchurch have been constructed, there remains the need to transport goods that are too dangerous or too large to travel through one of the tunnel. The route via Sumner remains a necessary transport alternative.

Construction of a road from Lyttelton to Christchurch via Evans Pass and Sumner began in 1849. However, progress was slow due to steep hillsides and hard volcanic rock being encountered. In 1850, a Bridle Path was cut directly over the saddle between Lyttelton and the Heathcote Valley so that the early settlers could travel to Ferrymead by foot and pack horse, while their heavy goods still needed to be transported across the Sumner Bar by boat. Road construction on the western side of the Sumner valley ceased in 1851 when construction encountered steep volcanic bluffs and funds ran out. The original road line, now known as Captain Thomas' Track, was abandoned and a new way down the eastern side of the valley between Evans Pass and Sumner was subsequently found and constructed. In 1952, the suburb was linked by several bus routes to its neighbouring suburbs and the central city.

Today, Southshore's public transportation is served by the frequent Airport (or Sheffield Crescent)—Sumner (route 3) bus service operated under the Metro brand. It serves the suburb to its neighbouring suburbs and the final destination of the route being Christchurch International Airport.

=== Public transport ===
A tramway opened to Sumner on 1 November 1888.

== Education ==
=== Sumner School ===
Sumner School was founded in 1876 and is these days a full primary school, teaching children from years 1 to 8. The school has a roll of 321 students as of July 2026.

=== Our Lady Star of the Sea School ===
Our Lady Star of the Sea Catholic School is a full primary school, teaching children from years 1 to 8. The school has a roll of 101 students. It opened in 1928.

=== Ko Taku Reo ===
The former van Asch College, which took hearing-impaired children from all over the South Island and the southern North Island, is now a residential campus for Ko Taku Reo. It opened in 1880 as Sumner School for the Deaf.

=== Sumner College ===
Variously known as "Sumner College", "Beach Glen Boarding School" or "Chelford", existed in Sumner between about 1877 and 1895. Schoolmaster C. L. Wiggins, as he was almost invariably known, appears to have moved his boarding school for young gentlemen to Sumner in August 1877, according to newspaper advertisements of the time. Wiggins has previously operated his boarding school at Akaroa and Fernside, before moving to Sumner. The school taught "the usual branches of a sound English education, together with Latin and French" and provided recreations including sea bathing, cricket, and "pedestrian excursions". Wiggins expanded his school at Sumner and built the dormitories and school rooms that were later leased and then sold to the Government School for the Deaf in the mid 1880s. From 1896, Wiggans was the Assistant Master in the Lower School of Christ's College. He subsequently founded a preparatory school in Durham Street, where he taught until he was 80 years old.

Clement Lester Wiggins was born in England in 1843, and educated at various schools before arriving in Lyttelton in 1861, aged 18. By 1870, he had become headmaster of the Akaroa public school, and served there for three years, before founding a private boarding school. He was also a church organist, Sunday school teacher, a founding member of the Sumner Lawn Tennis Club, and involved in local body politics. He died on 18 August 1927, aged 84.

== Sumner Life Boat Institution ==
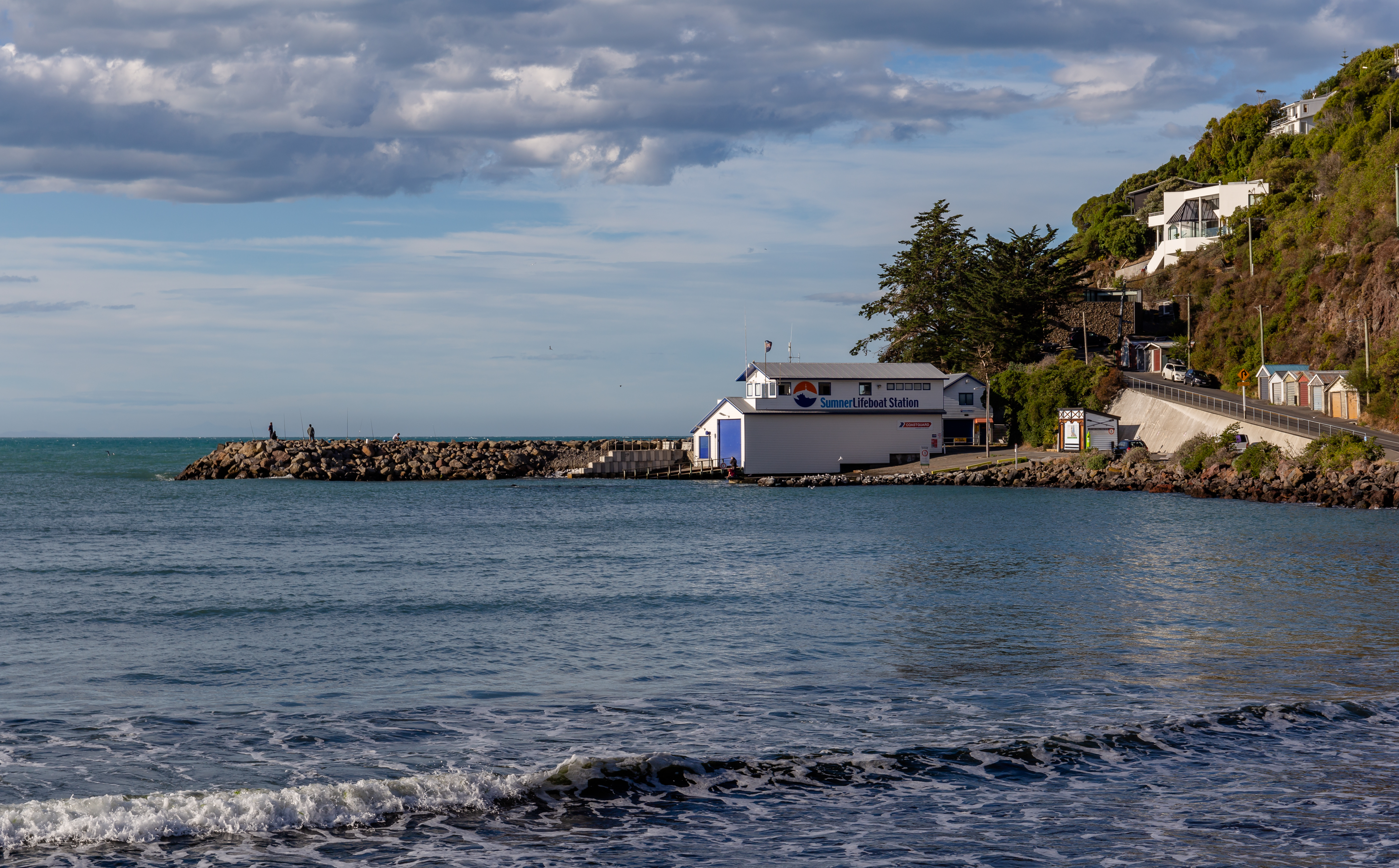
Sumner Lifeboat Station, Scarborough Slipway and Boat Harbour

Because of the hazard posed by the Sumner Bar, Sumner has had a lifeboat of some kind almost since its settlement. There is no record of a formal or even informal lifeboat being available prior to the appointment of a pilot in September 1864. However, it is likely that small open rowing boats were available in the bay from the early 1850s.

The Sumner Life Boat Institution has operated a formal life boat or similar rescue craft in the bay since 1898. The traditional name of Rescue has been applied to three of the life boats.

== Notable people ==
- Rita Angus (1908–1970), painter
- Edward Dobson (1816/17? – 1908), early landowner and resident
- Ruth France (1913–1968), librarian, poet and novelist
- William M. Hodgkins (1833–1898), painter
- William Orange (1889–1966), Anglican clergyman
- Samuel Hurst Seager (1855–1933), draftsman and architect who had a subdivision of eight houses built on Clifton Spur
- Petrus Van der Velden (1837–1913), Dutch-born painter and lithographer
- Felix Wakefield (1807–1875), first landowner
