= Mullogh (1855 ship) =

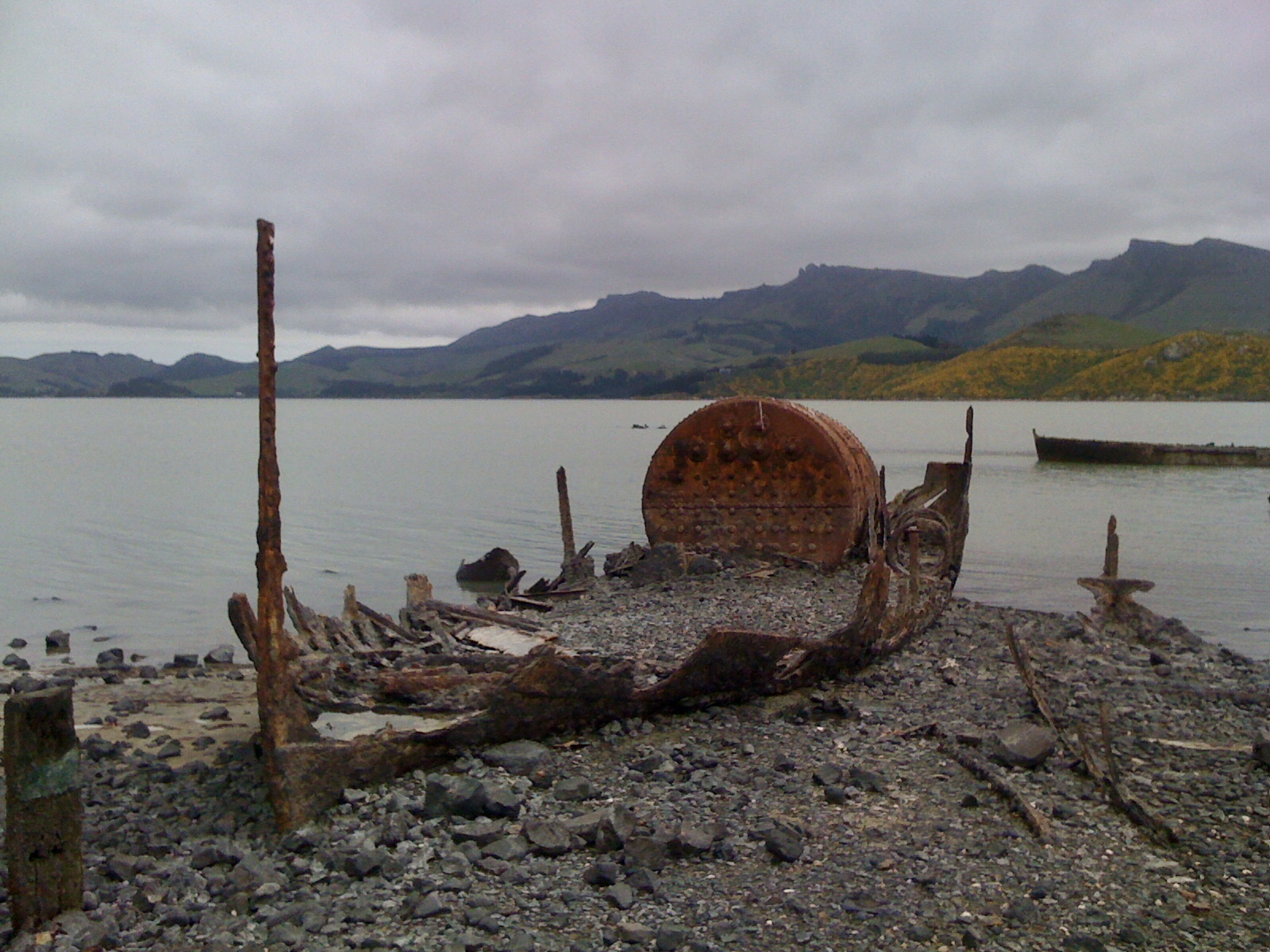
The remains of Mullogh beached on Quail Island.

Mullogh was a ketch rigged steam ship, built in 1855 in Belfast. It sailed to Australia, then to New Zealand. The wreck of Mullogh is now beached on Quail Island.

== Construction ==
Mullogh was built by Coates & Young, a Belfast foundry on Queen's Island in the River Lagan. It was 60 ft long, beam 15 ft, weighing 69.39 tons gross, 46.13 tons net.

The vessel was equipped with a 15 hp steam engine driving a propeller. Mullogh was completed in the same year that the modern propeller was patented by Robert Griffiths, making it one of the earliest known propeller-driven vessels.

== Australia ==
In 1857, Mullogh sailed to Melbourne, Australia, where it was used in trading up and down the Victoria and New South Wales coast.

== New Zealand ==
In 1859, Richard Dalgety, the man in charge of the port of Lyttelton, New Zealand needed a small steam powered vessel to service ships arriving at Lyttelton Harbour, taking cargo and passengers from ships berthed in the harbour to shore, and also to use as a tug when the wind was unsuitable for sailing into or out from the harbour. Such vessels were not readily available in New Zealand at this time, and Dalgety sourced Mullogh from Australia. On 1 June 1859, Mullogh was purchased by Dalgety along with John Maclean, a Christchurch merchant, for £1,600.

After a 22 day voyage, Mullogh arrived in Lyttelton on 29 June 1859 with a cargo of bricks. The vessel was sailed to New Zealand with the funnel and propeller in the hold.

For the next forty years, Mullogh transported cargo and passengers around the Canterbury region. Two trips were made to take supplies to the gold mines of the West Coast. Much of the cargo transported to Lyttelton from overseas was either towed or landed by the Mullogh, including the first steam locomotive in New Zealand in 1863, and the statue of John Robert Godley in 1867.

In 1900, the vessel's masts were removed and Mullogh was used as a fishing trawler from Lyttelton until 1912, when the vessel moved to Timaru.

== Beaching ==
Mullogh was still in survey in 1922, but in 1923 she was stripped and beached on Quail Island.

The beached remains of Mullogh remain on Quail Island, with the prominent boiler easily visible.
