= Godley Head =

Headland in New Zealand

Awaroa / Godley Head Awaroa (Māori)
- Headland
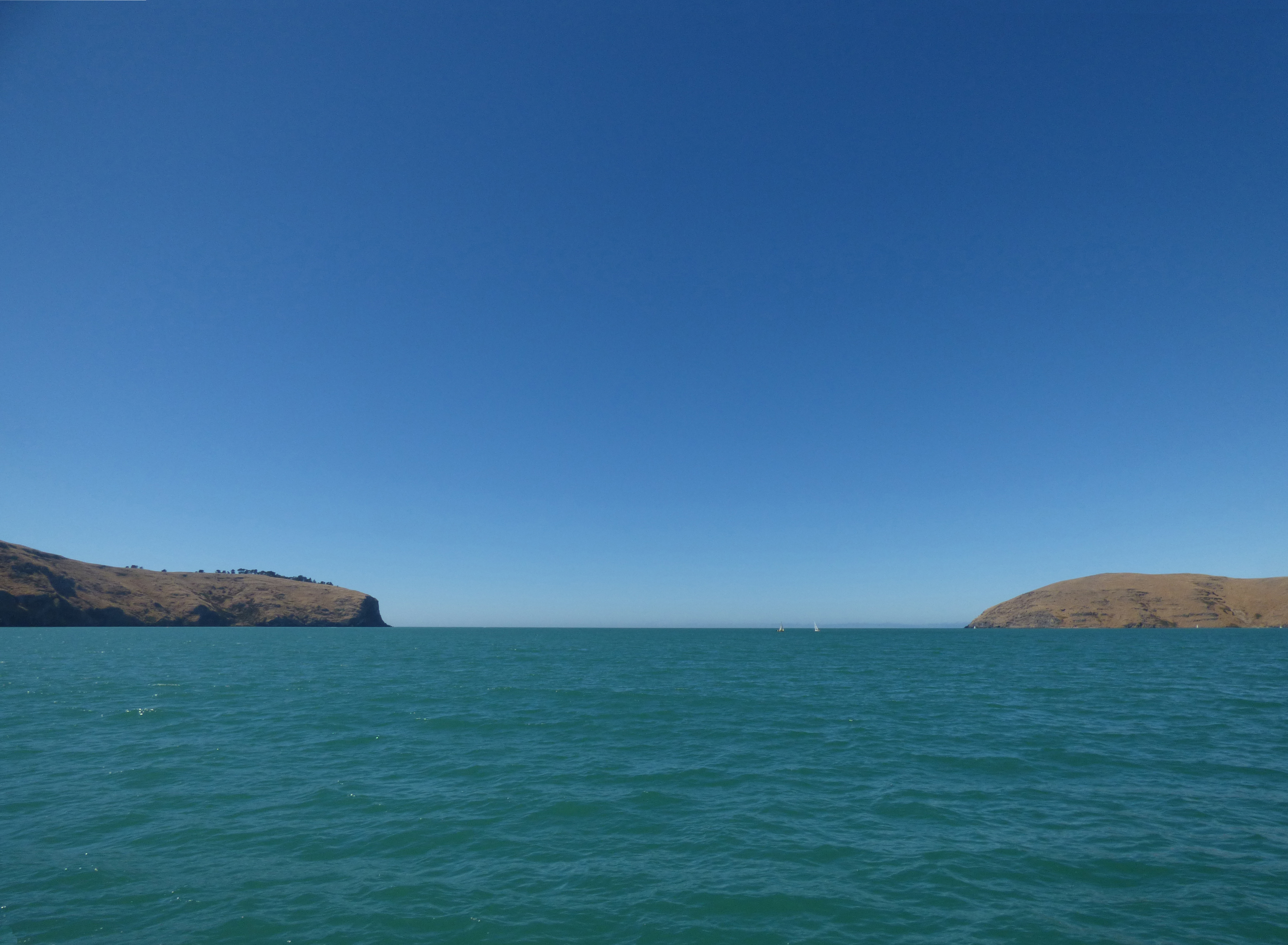
- Godley Head (left) and Te Piaka / Adderley Head (right), as seen from Lyttelton Harbour / Whakaraupō

- Location within Banks Peninsula
- Coordinates: 43°35′15″S 172°48′18″E
- Location: Christchurch, New Zealand
- Range: Port Hills
- Part of: Banks Peninsula
- Water bodies: Lyttelton Harbour / Whakaraupō
- Age: Miocene
- Formed by: Banks Peninsula Volcano
- Etymology: Named for John Robert Godley. Māori portion translates as "long river"

Awaroa / Godley Head (Māori: Awaroa), called Cachalot Head by early French explorers, is a prominent headland in Christchurch, New Zealand, located at the entrance to Lyttelton Harbour / Whakaraupō. The headland is named for John Robert Godley.

== Etymology ==
The headland was known to Māori as Awaroa. The wider area around Gollans Bay within Lyttelton Harbour / Whakaraupō is also known as Otokitoki, and this Māori language word refers either to 'the place of tokitoki' (a native tree commonly known as tītoki), or a brown duck (Anas chlorotis), or New Zealand dabchick (Poliocephalus rufopectus). The French whaler Cachalot, commanded by Jean Langlois, came to grief in this location in 1838, and the headland was then known Cachalot Head. The headland was renamed by Captain Joseph Thomas, the chief surveyor of the Canterbury Association, in his 1849 survey of Canterbury.

== Location ==
Godley Head is the easternmost end of the Port Hills. It forms the northern boundary to the entrance of Lyttelton Harbour / Whakaraupō; the headland on the southern side of the harbour is called Te Piaka / Adderley Head. The nearest settlement is Te Onepoto / Taylors Mistake. Walking access is via Pilgrims Way along the baches of Boulder Bay. Since the late 1920s, road access has been via the Summit Road.

== History ==
The land on top of Godley Head is exposed with no access to fresh water, which explains why there is no evidence of early Māori occupation. There was a lengthy discussion during the 1850s how a railway connection between the Christchurch Central City and Lyttelton could best be achieved. In the end, British civil engineer George Robert Stephenson was commissioned to give his recommendation based on survey plans. Stephenson discussed the option of a railway at sea level to be built along Godley Head and rejected this as "useless and unprofitable". Instead, he recommended the "direct route", and this was built as the Lyttelton Rail Tunnel.

== Facilities ==
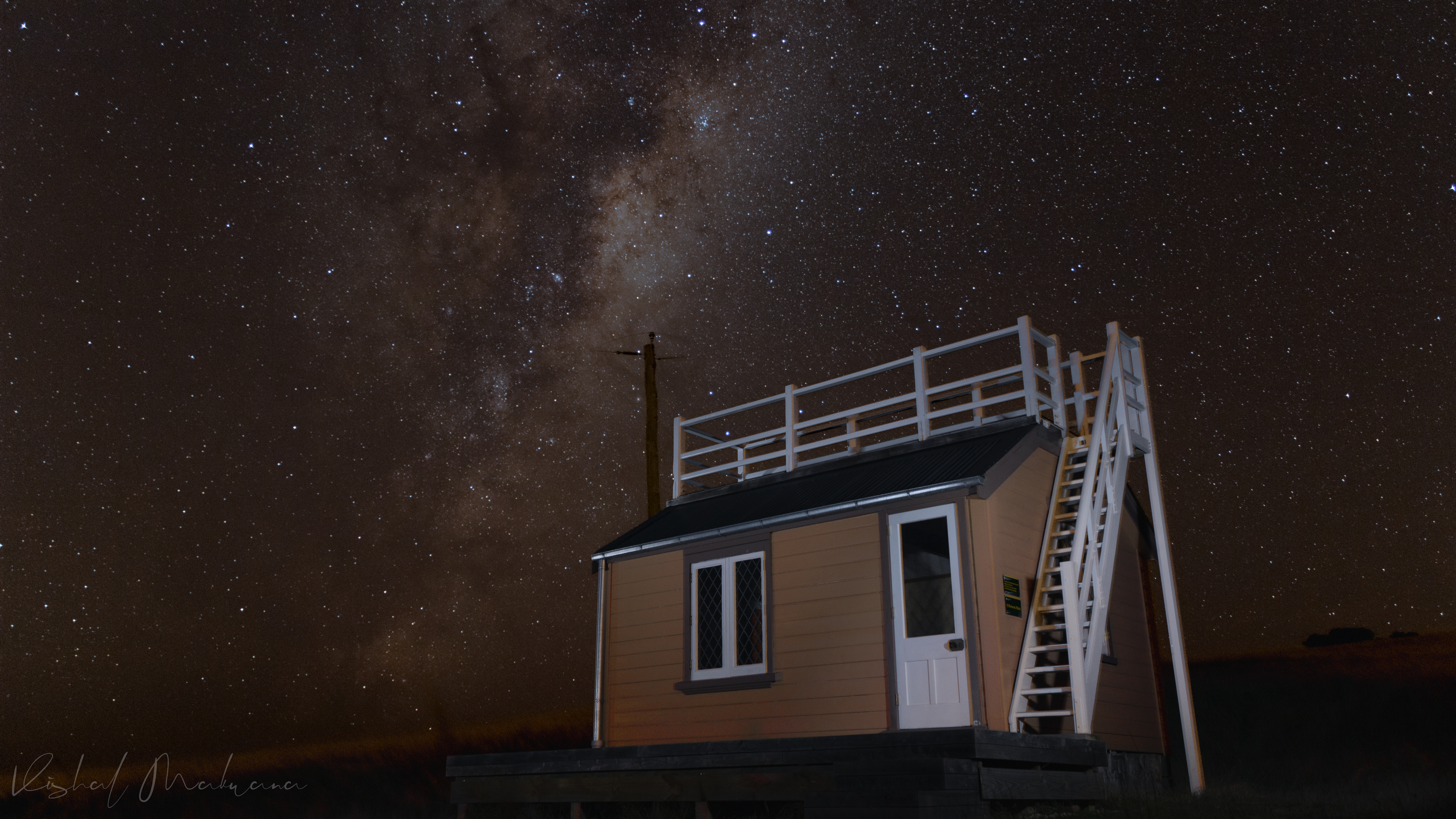
Scott's cabin

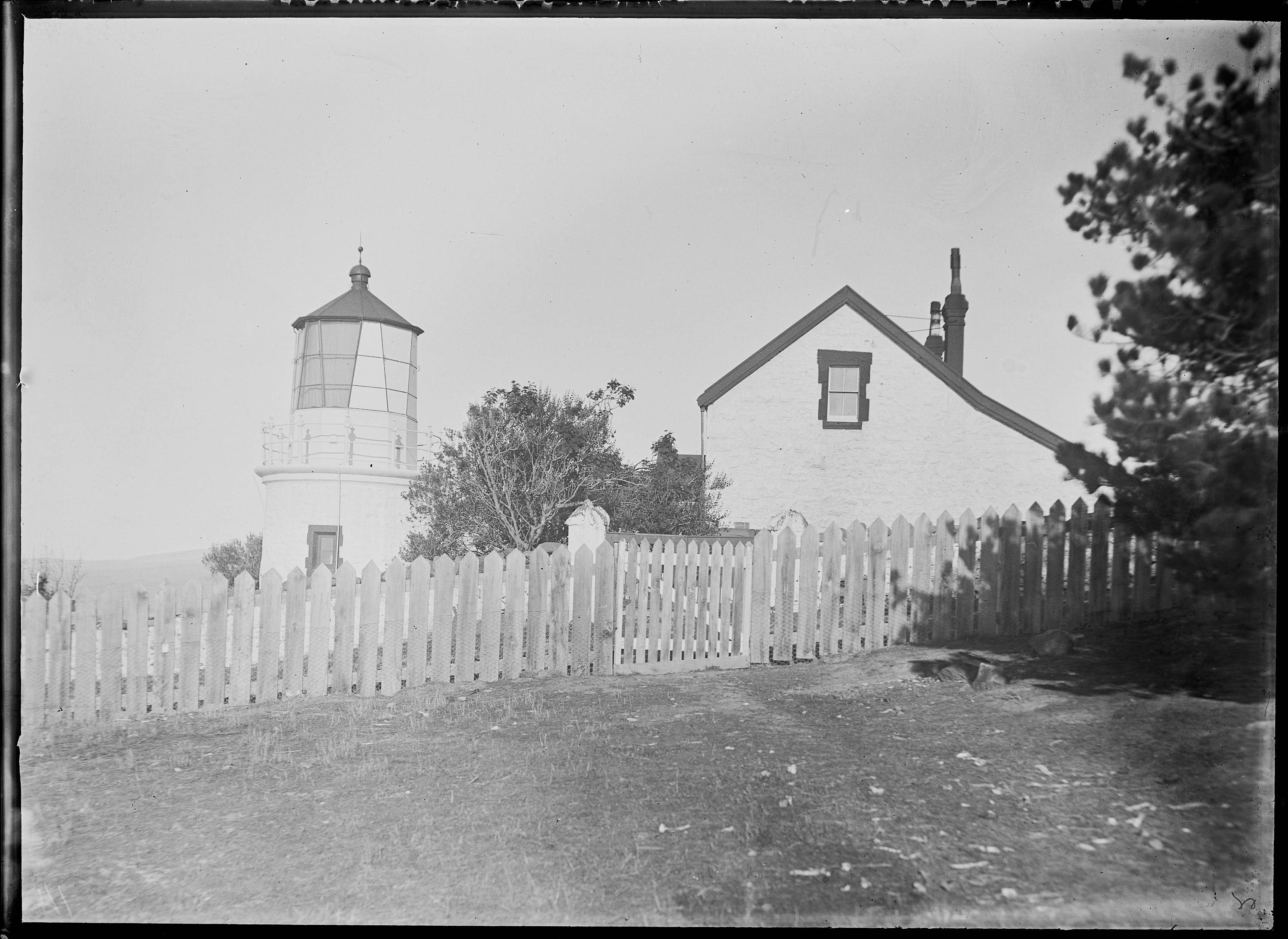
Godley Head lighthouse c. 1900-1920

=== Lighthouse ===
Captain Thomas noted in his 1849 report that the location was ideal for a lighthouse. The Canterbury Provincial Council approved the project in 1859 and put NZ£200 into the budget for the 1859–60 financial year. It was not until 1 March 1865 that the structure was put into commission.

=== Military base ===
The New Zealand army built a coastal defence battery at Godley Head in 1939. More than 400 soldiers were stationed there at one time. It closed as a military site in 1963.

=== Scott's cabin ===
Since 2013, Godley Head is home to a tiny historic cabin known under a variety of names, including Uncle Bill's Cabin (named for Edward Wilson who was known as Uncle Bill) and Scott's cabin (named for Robert Falcon Scott). Built in Norwich, England, as a kit set, it travelled with the Terra Nova Expedition to Antarctica as a weather station but was never assembled. It returned to Lyttelton—the expedition's base—and was dragged up a hill above Sumner to the home of Joseph Kinsey, who was the Christchurch agent for this expedition. Gifted by its private owners and rescued by the Department of Conservation after the Christchurch earthquakes from the top of a crumbling cliff, it was relocated to Godley Head to once again have a commanding view over the sea.

=== Campground ===
The headland is owned by the Department of Conservation (DOC). In October 2016, DOC opened a simple campground with 25 sites for tents and camper vans on a 12-months trial basis.
