= St Andrews Hill =

- Suburb
- Interactive map of St Andrews Hill
- Coordinates: 43°33′29.03″S 172°43′1.21″E
- Country: New Zealand
- City: Christchurch
- Local authority: Christchurch City Council
- Electoral ward: Heathcote
- Community board: Waihoro Spreydon-Cashmere-Heathcote

Area
  - Land: 87 ha (210 acres)

Population (2023 census)
  - Total: 1,431
  - Density: 1,600/km^{2} (4,300/sq mi)

St Andrews Hill is a hillside suburb in south-east Christchurch, New Zealand.

== History ==
The first European owner of 50 acres (20 ha) of the bottom of the hill was Reverend Edward Hooper Kittoe, who never came out to New Zealand, and for whom Edward Ward (eldest brother of Crosbie Ward) chose this land. The next 50 acres higher up the hill were purchased by the surveyor Robert Park, who later laid out the township of Ashburton. The land was later purchased by Major Alfred Hornbrook, who added it to his Mount Pleasant run. The Mount Pleasant run changed ownership to Richard May Morten, and upon his death in 1909, his sons Richard and Arthur Morten became trustees of the estate. The trustees broke up the run into numerous smaller lots and sold these at auction in March 1912.

In late 1920, ratepayers in the greater Mount Pleasant area petitioned to move their local council jurisdiction from the Borough of Sumner to Heathcote County, as the area was still mostly farmland. The petition was granted in early 1921.

Subdivision of the land began in 1925, after Peter Trolove and Walter de Thier purchased a block of 50 acres. They put four sections up for auction that year, but only sold one of them. The new owner formed a road and called it The Brae after his home in Scotland. Further subdivision started in 1930, when St Andrews Hill Road, Te Awakura Terrace, and 45 sections were surveyed. Trolove and de Thier called their subdivision after St Andrews Links, the famous golf course in Scotland. A further subdivision happened higher up the hill when the 106 acres (43 ha) Cannon Hill estate was bought by a syndicate in 1960.

== Local government ==
In terms of local government, St Andrews Hill was originally seen as part of Mount Pleasant, which was administered by the Heathcote Road Board (originally East Heathcote Road Board) that was formed in 1864. In 1891, the area east of the Ōpāwaho / Heathcote River was lost upon petition to the Sumner Borough. Heathcote became a county in 1911 and Mount Pleasant returned to Heathcote's administration in 1921. Moves for St Andrews Hill to secede to Christchurch City began in 1941, with the main issue a desire for better water supply. Most of the built up area transferred to the city in April 1943, with a further area following two years later.

== Demographics ==
St Andrews Hill covers 0.87 km^{2} (0.34 sq mi). It is part of the larger Mount Pleasant statistical area.

Historical population
Year	Pop.	±% p.a.
2006	1,599	—
2013	1,026	−6.14%
2018	1,263	+4.24%
2023	1,431	+2.53%

St Andrews Hill had a population of 1,431 in the 2023 New Zealand census, an increase of 168 people (13.3%) since the 2018 census, and an increase of 405 people (39.5%) since the 2013 census. There were 717 males, 702 females, and 3 people of other genders in 597 dwellings. 2.9% of people identified as LGBTIQ+. There were 198 people (13.8%) aged under 15 years, 144 (10.1%) aged 15 to 29, 714 (49.9%) aged 30 to 64, and 372 (26.0%) aged 65 or older.

People could identify as more than one ethnicity. The results were 93.9% European (Pākehā); 6.3% Māori; 0.8% Pasifika; 4.0% Asian; 0.4% Middle Eastern, Latin American and African New Zealanders (MELAA); and 1.7% other, which includes people giving their ethnicity as "New Zealander". English was spoken by 98.3%, Māori by 1.3%, and other languages by 9.9%. No language could be spoken by 1.5% (e.g. too young to talk). New Zealand Sign Language was known by 0.4%. The percentage of people born overseas was 23.1, compared with 28.8% nationally.

Religious affiliations were 28.9% Christian, 0.6% Hindu, 1.0% Buddhist, 0.8% New Age, 0.4% Jewish, and 0.6% other religions. People who answered that they had no religion were 62.1%, and 5.0% of people did not answer the census question.

Of those at least 15 years old, 528 (42.8%) people had a bachelor's or higher degree, 552 (44.8%) had a post-high school certificate or diploma, and 162 (13.1%) people exclusively held high school qualifications. 297 people (24.1%) earned over $100,000 compared to 12.1% nationally. The employment status of those at least 15 was 591 (47.9%) full-time, 213 (17.3%) part-time, and 15 (1.2%) unemployed.
