= John Monck =

John Monck may refer to:

- John Monck (courtier) (1883–1964), British Marshal of the Diplomatic Corps
- John Monck (cricketer) (1845–1929), New Zealand cricketer
- John Monck (film producer) (1908–1999), British film executive, known also as John Goldman
- John Monck (politician) (1769–1834), British Member of Parliament for Reading
- John Stanley Monck, Church of Ireland priest
