= Clifton, Christchurch =

Suburb of Christchurch, New Zealand

Clifton
- Suburb
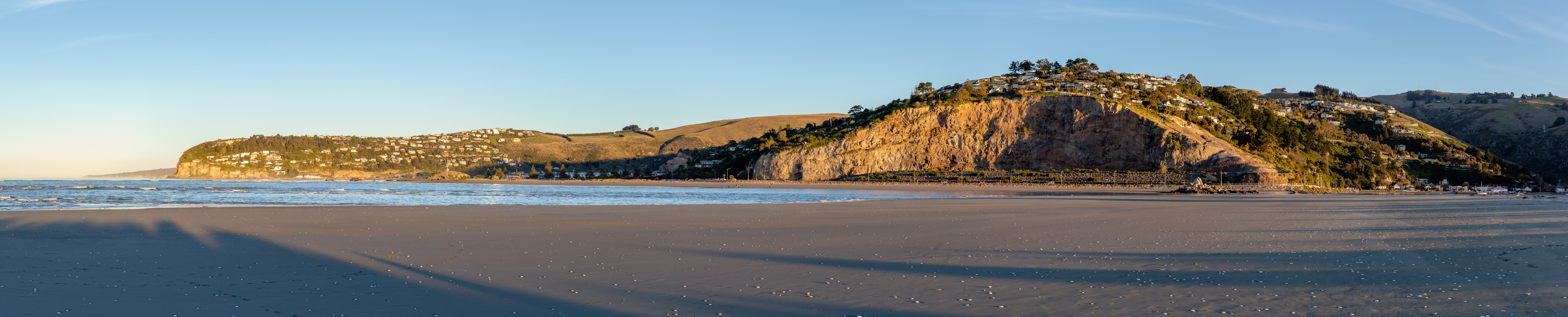
- Clifton (above the cliff) and Sumner Bay
- Interactive map of Clifton
- Coordinates: 43°33′S 172°45′E
- Country: New Zealand
- City: Christchurch
- Local authority: Christchurch City Council
- Electoral ward: Heathcote
- Community board: Waihoro Spreydon-Cashmere-Heathcote

Area
  - Land: 256 ha (630 acres)

Population (June 2025)
  - Total: 1,950
  - Density: 762/km^{2} (1,970/sq mi)

Moncks Bay	(Avon Heathcote Estuary)
Redcliffs	Clifton
	Port Hills	Sumner

Clifton is a hillside suburb above Sumner in Christchurch, New Zealand.

Clifton is a volcanic spur extending from Tauhinukorokio / Mount Pleasant. Most of Clifton was originally purchased by Dr Alfred Barker, who had applied for a 50 acres (20 ha) land grant from the Christchurch land office. Barker sold his land in 1872. The lower part of Clifton was undeveloped until 1903, when it was subdivided into 93 sections and put up for auction, as far up the hill as Tuawera Terrace, which was originally known as Victoria Terrace. The land further up the hill was subdivided in 1908.

A lower side spur, originally known as Lower Clifton, was bought in 1901 by Samuel Hurst Seager. Seager landscaped and divided the section into 12 plots and it was sold under the name The Spur in 1914. It has been known as the Spur since. This area is the main residential hill area above Sumner.

The ridge that Clifton lies upon, descends from Tauhinukorokio / Mount Pleasant to end in a coastal cliff at the western end of Sumner beach. The cliff overhangs the road between Sumner and Moncks Bay that has been built along the beach. This area by the beach is now known as Peacocks Gallop because John Thomas Peacock would gallop his horse when riding along this section of road on account of his fear of being hit by falling rocks. Earthquakes in 2011 and later in 2016 caused the cliff edge to collapse and recede so much that several clifftop houses were undermined and severely damaged, or left perched precariously on the cliff edge. Shipping containers were stacked two-high on the main road below to protect it from further rockfalls and these subsequently became an impromptu roadside art gallery.

== Demographics ==
The Clifton Hill statistical area, which also includes Moncks Bay and Richmond Hill, covers 2.56 km^{2} (0.99 sq mi). It had an estimated population of 1,950 as of June 2025, with a population density of 762 people per km^{2}.

Historical population
Year	Pop.	±% p.a.
2006	1,851	—
2013	1,479	−3.15%
2018	1,647	+2.18%
2023	1,881	+2.69%

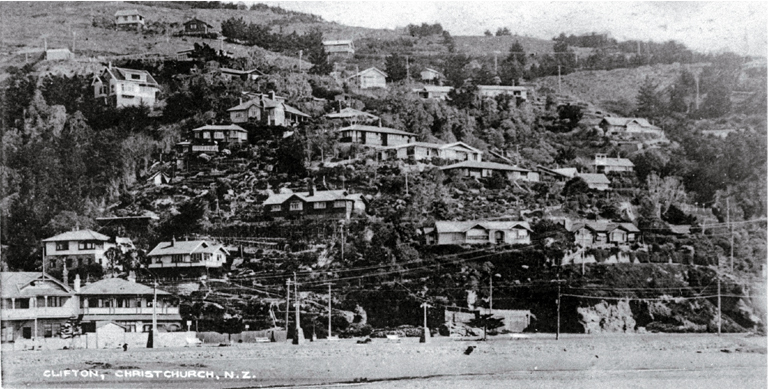
Clifton Spur in 1920

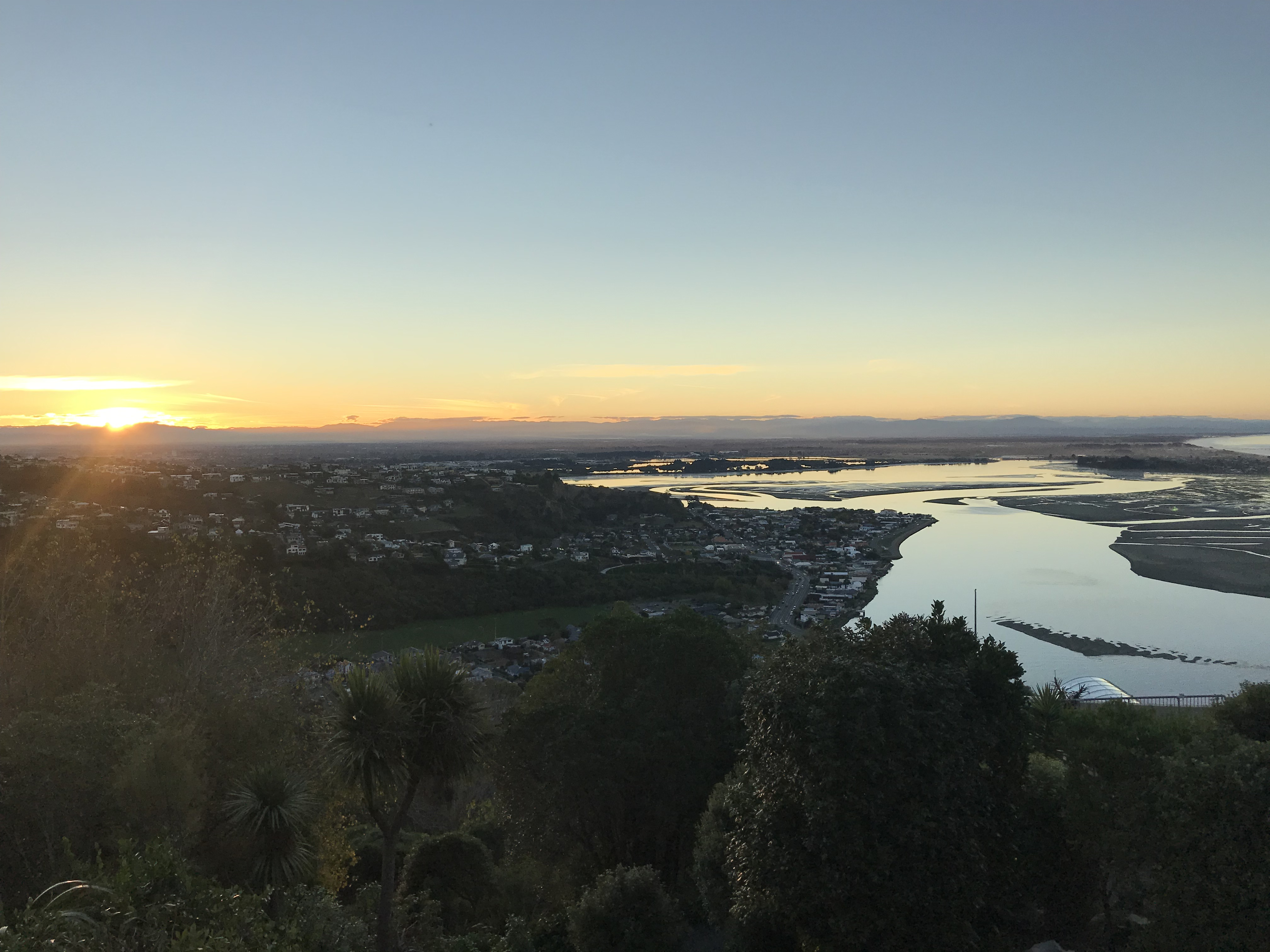
Avon Heathcote Estuary from Clifton Hill

Clifton Hill had a population of 1,881 in the 2023 New Zealand census, an increase of 234 people (14.2%) since the 2018 census, and an increase of 402 people (27.2%) since the 2013 census. There were 933 males, 942 females, and 3 people of other genders in 741 dwellings. 2.9% of people identified as LGBTIQ+. The median age was 48.9 years (compared with 38.1 years nationally). There were 294 people (15.6%) aged under 15 years, 243 (12.9%) aged 15 to 29, 939 (49.9%) aged 30 to 64, and 405 (21.5%) aged 65 or older.

People could identify as more than one ethnicity. The results were 96.5% European (Pākehā); 4.6% Māori; 0.6% Pasifika; 3.0% Asian; 0.6% Middle Eastern, Latin American and African New Zealanders (MELAA); and 1.4% other, which includes people giving their ethnicity as "New Zealander". English was spoken by 98.6%, Māori by 1.3%, and other languages by 12.6%. No language could be spoken by 1.1% (e.g. too young to talk). New Zealand Sign Language was known by 0.3%. The percentage of people born overseas was 30.0, compared with 28.8% nationally.

Religious affiliations were 24.6% Christian, 0.2% Hindu, 0.3% Islam, 0.5% Buddhist, 0.5% New Age, 0.2% Jewish, and 1.3% other religions. People who answered that they had no religion were 67.3%, and 5.4% of people did not answer the census question.

Of those at least 15 years old, 732 (46.1%) people had a bachelor's or higher degree, 672 (42.3%) had a post-high school certificate or diploma, and 180 (11.3%) people exclusively held high school qualifications. The median income was $53,600, compared with $41,500 nationally. 429 people (27.0%) earned over $100,000 compared to 12.1% nationally. The employment status of those at least 15 was 753 (47.4%) full-time, 318 (20.0%) part-time, and 30 (1.9%) unemployed.
