= Moncks Bay =

- Suburb
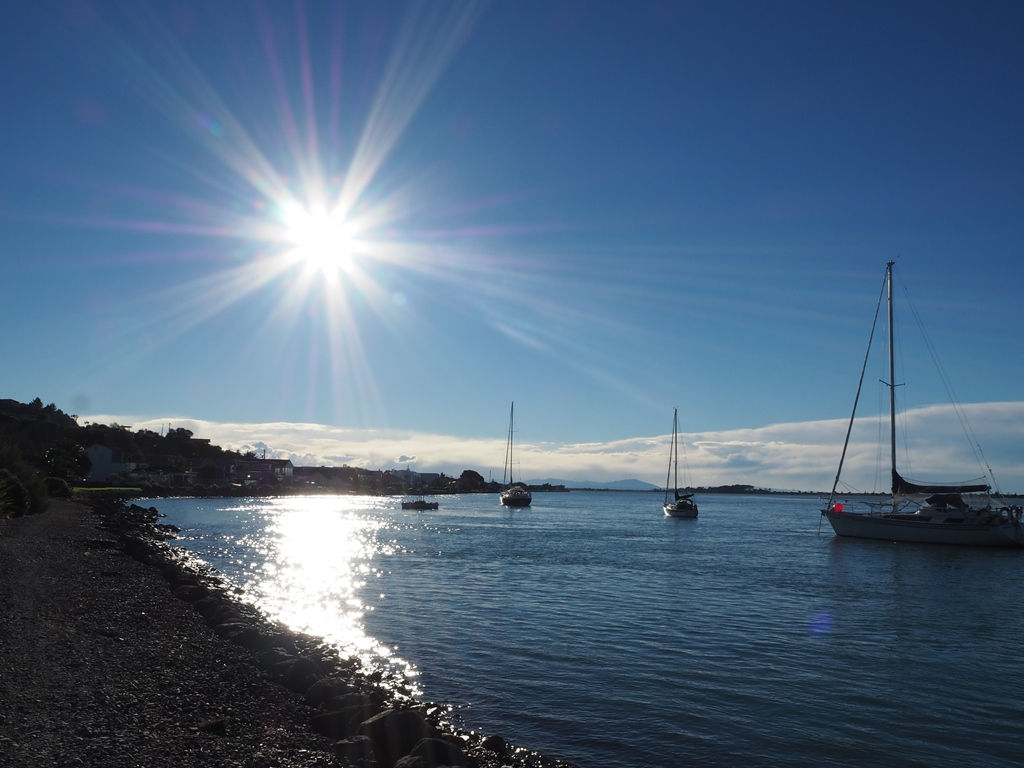
- A sunny afternoon in Moncks Bay
- Interactive map of Moncks Bay
- Coordinates: 43.567°S 172.743°E
- Country: New Zealand
- City: Christchurch
- Local authority: Christchurch City Council
- Electoral ward: Heathcote

Area
  - Land: 57 ha (140 acres)

Population (2023 Census)
  - Total: 537
  - Density: 940/km^{2} (2,400/sq mi)

	(Avon Heathcote Estuary)
Redcliffs	Moncks Bay	Clifton
	Port Hills

Moncks Bay is a south-eastern suburb of Christchurch, New Zealand.

The first European owner of 100 acres (40 ha) in Moncks Bay was George Heath, who arrived in Lyttelton in March 1851 on the Isabella Hercus. He also had 500 acres (200 ha) of land on the hills behind. Heath sold the land to William McCormack in 1860; McCormacks Bay in the adjacent suburb Mount Pleasant is named for his brother. Moncks Bay changed owner again in 1868, and was purchased in 1869 by John Stanley Monck, after whom the area was named. Monck increased his land holdings up the hill by purchasing adjacent property from Dr Alfred Charles Barker (50 acres or 20 hectares) and in 1882, he acquired land from the estate of Alfred Watson that brought his holdings in Redcliffs to a total of about 300 acres (120 ha).

== Demographics ==
Moncks Bay is part of the Clifton Hill statistical area.

Historical population
Year	Pop.	±% p.a.
2006	465	—
2013	483	+0.54%
2018	486	+0.12%
2023	537	+2.02%

Moncks Bay covers 0.57 km^{2} (0.22 sq mi). It had a population of 537 in the 2023 New Zealand census, an increase of 51 people (10.5%) since the 2018 census, and an increase of 54 people (11.2%) since the 2013 census. There were 255 males and 276 females in 210 dwellings. 2.2% of people identified as LGBTIQ+. There were 102 people (19.0%) aged under 15 years, 72 (13.4%) aged 15 to 29, 252 (46.9%) aged 30 to 64, and 114 (21.2%) aged 65 or older.

People could identify as more than one ethnicity. The results were 96.6% European (Pākehā); 5.6% Māori; 3.4% Asian; and 0.6% Middle Eastern, Latin American and African New Zealanders (MELAA). English was spoken by 98.3%, Māori by 1.7%, and other languages by 7.3%. No language could be spoken by 1.7% (e.g. too young to talk). The percentage of people born overseas was 25.1, compared with 28.8% nationally.

Religious affiliations were 23.5% Christian, 0.6% New Age, 0.6% Jewish, and 2.2% other religions. People who answered that they had no religion were 68.2%, and 5.0% of people did not answer the census question.

Of those at least 15 years old, 174 (40.0%) people had a bachelor's or higher degree, 213 (49.0%) had a post-high school certificate or diploma, and 63 (14.5%) people exclusively held high school qualifications. 102 people (23.4%) earned over $100,000 compared to 12.1% nationally. The employment status of those at least 15 was 207 (47.6%) full-time, 78 (17.9%) part-time, and 3 (0.7%) unemployed.
