= Chairman of Committees =

Chairman of Committees may refer to:

- Chairman of Committees (Australian House of Representatives), former title of the Deputy Speaker of the Australian House of Representatives
- Chairman of Committees (Australian Senate), one of the roles of the Deputy President of the Senate
- Chairman of Committees (House of Lords), a role that exists in the British House of Lords
- Chairman of Committees (New Zealand House of Representatives), a role that existed in New Zealand between 1854 and 1992
- Chairman of Committees (New Zealand Legislative Council), a role that existed in New Zealand between 1865 and 1950
