= Richmond Hill, New Zealand =

Richmond Hill
- Suburb
- Interactive map of Richmond Hill
- Country: New Zealand
- City: Christchurch
- Local authority: Christchurch City Council
- Electoral ward: Heathcote

Area
  - Land: 89 ha (220 acres)

Population (2023 Census)
  - Total: 480
  - Density: 540/km^{2} (1,400/sq mi)

	(Avon Heathcote Estuary)
Clifton	Richmond Hill	Sumner
	Port Hills

Richmond Hill is a hillside suburb above Sumner in Christchurch, New Zealand.

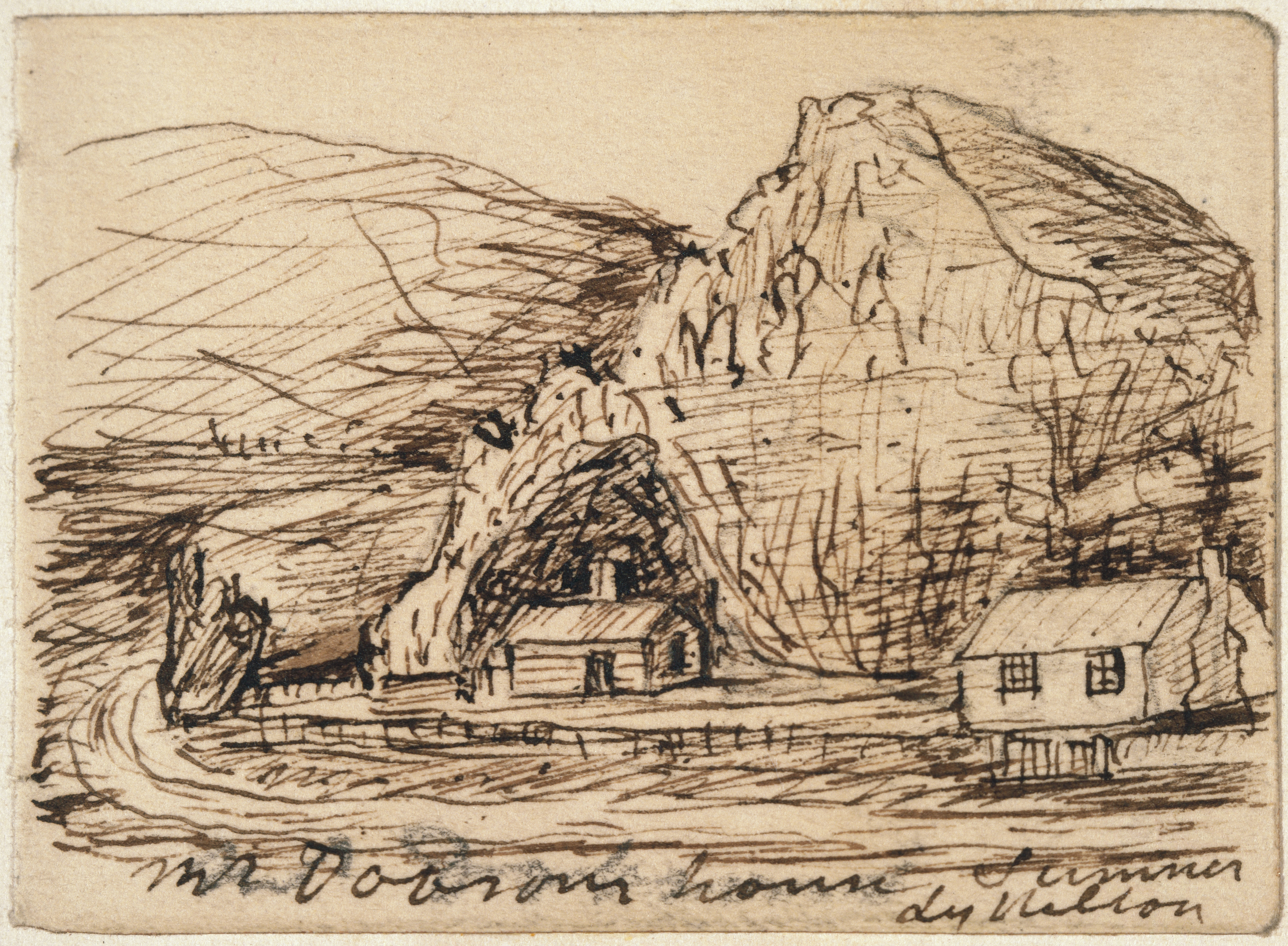
Two small buildings in Sumner, one of which belonged to Dobson and was located in Nayland Street (pencil sketch, 1865)

Richmond Hill is a volcanic spur extending from Tauhinukorokio / Mount Pleasant. The first European owner was Edward Dobson, who had a cottage in Nayland Street and whose 50 acres (20 ha) ran up the hill. Dobson kept 2 acres (0.81 ha) around his house and sold the remainder of his land to George Day. Upon Day's death, the land passed to his daughter, who sold it to the Morton brothers (Arthur and R. M. D.), and who in turn sold it to George Humphreys. The latter subdivided the land and had a road up the hill built by 1909. Walter de Thier managed Humphreys' farm on the hill and his favourite song was "The Lass of Richmond Hill", and with Humphreys' consent, the property was called Richmond Hill.

Humphreys was a leading businessman who lived at Daresbury in Fendalton. He was also a member of the Christchurch Golf Club and took pity of a group of men who regularly met in Sumner on an empty section for an improvised game of golf using hockey sticks, tennis balls, and tin cans sank into the ground as holes. He offered them 40 acres (16 ha) of his undulating land, on which the 12-hole Richmond Hill Golf Course opened in April 1910.

Due to the steepness of the road up from Nayland Street, the subdivision was slow to develop. There were just ten houses on Richmond Hill by 1930, and activity only picked up after the end of World War II. One of the early residents included the architect Cecil Wood. The golf course closed in December 1997 and some of the land was further subdivided.

== Demographics ==
Richmond Hill is part of the Clifton Hill statistical area.

Historical population
Year	Pop.	±% p.a.
2006	333	—
2013	273	−2.80%
2018	390	+7.39%
2023	480	+4.24%

Richmond Hill covers 0.89 km^{2} (0.34 sq mi). It had a population of 480 in the 2023 New Zealand census, an increase of 90 people (23.1%) since the 2018 census, and an increase of 207 people (75.8%) since the 2013 census. There were 237 males and 237 females in 171 dwellings. 1.9% of people identified as LGBTIQ+. There were 78 people (16.2%) aged under 15 years, 66 (13.8%) aged 15 to 29, 264 (55.0%) aged 30 to 64, and 60 (12.5%) aged 65 or older.

People could identify as more than one ethnicity. The results were 95.0% European (Pākehā); 4.4% Māori; 3.8% Asian; 0.6% Middle Eastern, Latin American and African New Zealanders (MELAA); and 2.5% other, which includes people giving their ethnicity as "New Zealander". English was spoken by 98.8%, Māori by 0.6%, and other languages by 13.8%. No language could be spoken by 1.2% (e.g. too young to talk). New Zealand Sign Language was known by 0.6%. The percentage of people born overseas was 33.8, compared with 28.8% nationally.

Religious affiliations were 23.8% Christian, 0.6% Hindu, 0.6% Islam, 0.6% Buddhist, 0.6% Jewish, and 0.6% other religions. People who answered that they had no religion were 67.5%, and 5.6% of people did not answer the census question.

Of those at least 15 years old, 195 (48.5%) people had a bachelor's or higher degree, 180 (44.8%) had a post-high school certificate or diploma, and 36 (9.0%) people exclusively held high school qualifications. 117 people (29.1%) earned over $100,000 compared to 12.1% nationally. The employment status of those at least 15 was 207 (51.5%) full-time, 81 (20.1%) part-time, and 9 (2.2%) unemployed.
