= John Barr (New Zealand politician) =

New Zealand politician representing labour interests

The Honourable John Barr
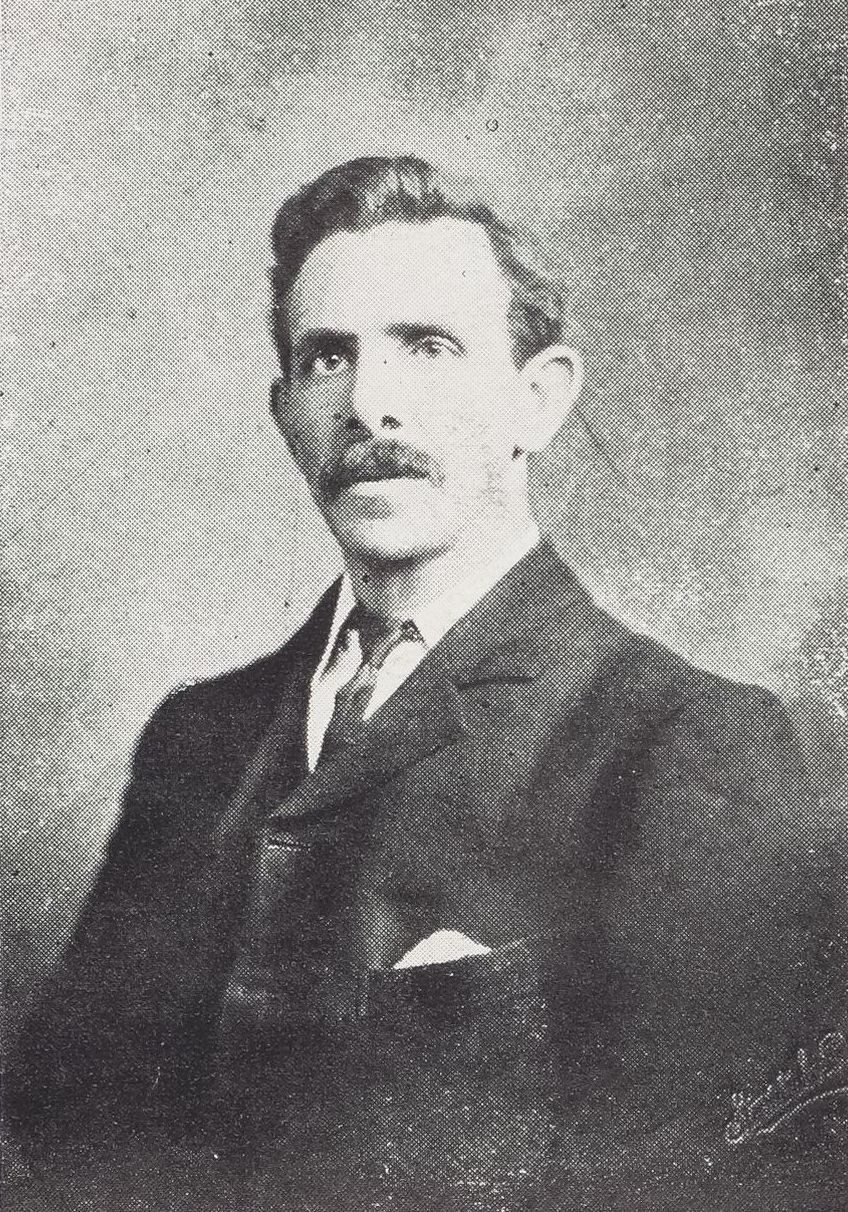
- Barr in 1907

8th Chairman of Committees of the Legislative Council
- In office 8 July 1925 – 7 December 1930
- Preceded by: Oliver Samuel
- Succeeded by: Edward Henry Clark

Member of the New Zealand Legislative Council
- In office 22 January 1907 – 7 December 1930

Personal details
- Born: 1 January 1867 Paisley, Scotland
- Died: 7 December 1930 (aged 63) Dunedin, New Zealand
- Resting place: Bromley Cemetery
- Party: Labour
- Spouse: Helen Barr

John Barr (1 January 1867 – 7 December 1930) was a New Zealand politician representing labour interests. A stonemason by trade, he was involved in many organisations, was a community leader in Redcliffs and became Mayor of Sumner. The establishment of Redcliffs School is credited to him. He was a Member of the Legislative Council for 23 years, where he held the role of Chairman of Committees for the years before his death.

== Biography ==
=== Early life and career ===
Barr was born in Paisley, Scotland, in 1867, and attended a public school at Pollokshaws. His parents were John Barr and Mary Brown. His first job was in a weaving factory in Glasgow. He became interested in social reform in Scotland and advocated for unions and temperance.

On 8 Feb 1888, he married Helen McPherson Niddrie (b. 6 December 1867 in Stirling). They had seven children in Scotland (their eldest died before they emigrated) and a further three in New Zealand.

He was employed as a stonemason and telegraph linesman in the United States, Canada and British Columbia. In 1902, he immigrated to New Zealand and settled at Redcliffs near Sumner, where he became the leader of the small community (by 1905, Redcliffs had 70 residents). He continued to work as a stonemason and worked on Christ Church Cathedral, the Trinity Congregational Church and later the pillars for the World War I memorial lamps along Sumner Esplanade.

He was active with many organisations. He founded the Christchurch Trades and Labour Council and became its first president. He was chairman of the Christchurch Tramway Board. He was chairman of the Sumner School committee (1904–1907) at a time when the school was overcrowded (100 pupils were accommodated in two classrooms) and Redcliffs' children had to walk there, as the Education Board would not subsidise tram fares. Barr campaigned for a school at Redcliffs, which was opened on 16 September 1907.

The Barr family lived in Estuary Road in Redcliffs. The road was renamed in 1948 to Beachville Road.

=== Political career ===
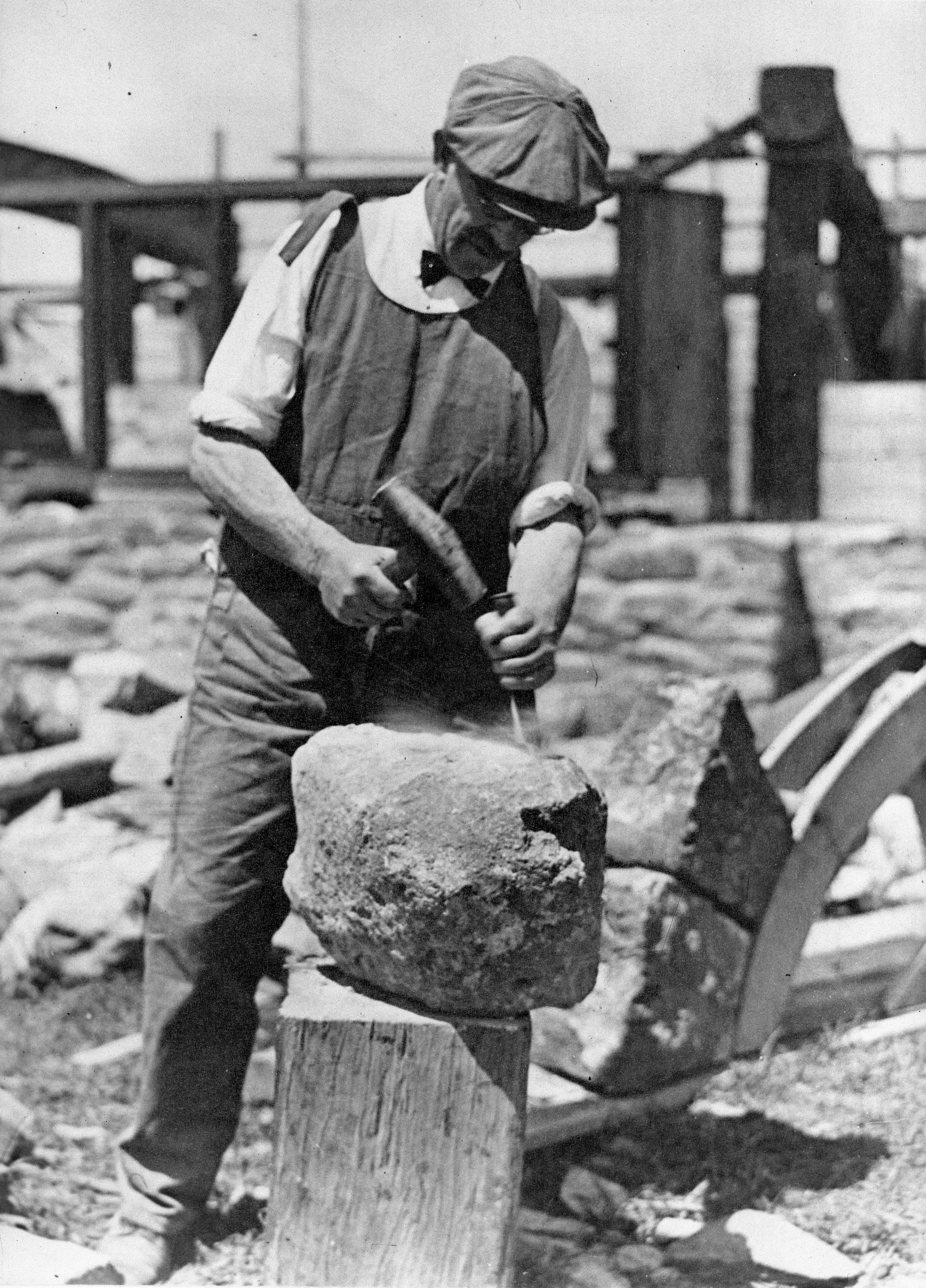
John Barr chiselling a stone, ca 1930

Barr was appointed to the Legislative Council on 22 January 1907, when the Liberal Government wanted to increase the representation of workers. Prime Minister Richard Seddon had made the last appointments to the Legislative Council in 1903 and Barr was part of a group of 14 who were appointed by Seddon's successor Joseph Ward to revert the reduction in size of the Legislative Council by about one quarter. Ward was careful to achieve an appropriate geographical and vocational distribution, but was attacked by the opposition for appointing men lacking in parliamentary experience. Controversy centred about John Barr, and Ward admitted that the government had been unaware that he had been in the country for less than five years, but that they had been assured that "he would be a suitable representative of the workers". At the end of Barr's seven-year term, he was reappointed on 22 January in 1914, 1921, and 1928, when he served until his death. On 8 July 1925, he was elected Chairman of Committees of the Legislative Council, a post that he held until his death.

Barr became Mayor of Sumner in 1917 and held that post until 1923. During that time, his main emphasis went on the improvement of the water supply and five wells were dug on little Rat Island in the Avon Heathcote Estuary (the island no longer exists; it had eroded away by the late 1920s), and reservoirs were built in Redcliffs.

=== Death ===
Barr died in Dunedin on 7 December 1930. He is buried at Bromley Cemetery. He was survived by his wife, who died in 1953.

== Notes ==
Political offices
Preceded by Oliver Samuel	Chairman of Committees of the Legislative Council; 1925–1930	Succeeded by Edward Henry Clark
