= Oliver Samuel =

New Zealand politician

The Honourable Oliver Samuel
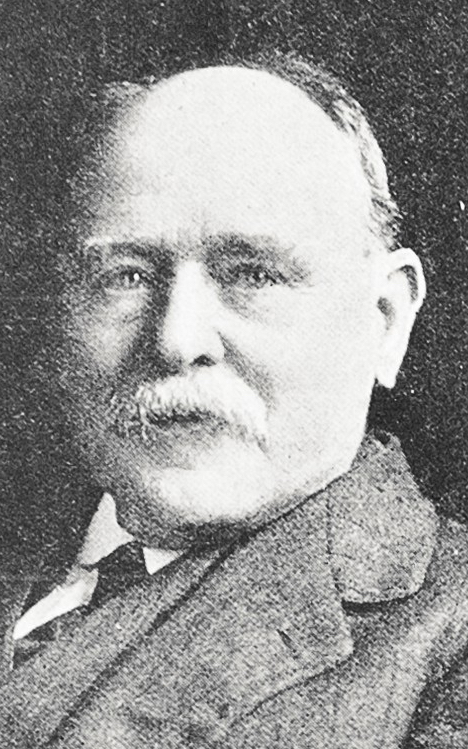

Member of the New Zealand Parliament for New Plymouth
- In office 22 July 1884 – 5 December 1890
- Preceded by: Thomas Kelly
- Succeeded by: Edward Smith

Personal details
- Born: 1849 Saint Helier, Jersey
- Died: 11 January 1925 (aged 75–76) New Plymouth, New Zealand
- Party: Liberal
- Spouse: Rosamond Carrington (m. 1883)
- Occupation: Lawyer

Oliver Samuel KC (1849 – 11 January 1925) was a 19th-century Member of Parliament from Taranaki in New Zealand.

== Biography ==
=== Early life and career ===
Born in Saint Helier, Jersey in 1849, Samuel emigrated to New Zealand with his family in 1855. He was educated at Nelson College from 1863 to 1865. In 1883, he married Rosamond Carrington, a daughter of the surveyor Octavius Carrington who, alongside his brother Frederic Carrington, was regarded as a father of New Plymouth.

=== Political career ===
New Zealand Parliament
Years	Term	Electorate	Party
1884–1887	9th	New Plymouth	Independent
1887–1890	10th	New Plymouth	Independent

He represented the New Plymouth electorate from 1884 to 1890, when he retired. He was elected as a supporter of the Stout–Vogel Ministry.

After retiring in 1890 he was speculated to return to politics via appointment to the Legislative Council in 1906 to fill a cabinet vacancy as the Attorney-General. On 22 January 1907, he was duly appointed to the Legislative Council though not to cabinet. He was reappointed on 14 July 1914 and 14 July 1921. He remained a member until his death on 11 January 1925. From 19 November 1918 until his death, he was Chairman of Committees.

A deputation of Liberal Party supporters attempted to request he stand for the lower house seat of Taranaki at the 1914 election, but he declined to be a candidate.

=== Later life and death ===
On 24 December 1919, he was appointed King's Counsel.

Samuel died on 11 January 1925 at New Plymouth, and was buried at Te Henui Cemetery.

== See also ==
- List of King's and Queen's Counsel in New Zealand

== Notes ==
Political offices
Preceded by Walter Carncross	Chairman of Committees of the Legislative Council; 1918–1925	Succeeded by John Barr
New Zealand Parliament
Preceded by Thomas Kelly	Member of Parliament for New Plymouth; 1884–1890	Succeeded by Edward Smith
