= Edward Henry Clark =

New Zealand politician

Edward Henry Clark (1870 – 24 June 1932) was an independent Member of Parliament for Chalmers, in the South Island of New Zealand. He was a Member of the Legislative Council and for a time was its Chairman of Committees.

== Early life ==
Clark was born in Palmerston, Otago and was a building contractor in Dunedin.

== Political career ==
New Zealand Parliament
Years	Term	Electorate	Party
1908–1911	17th	Chalmers	Independent Liberal
1911–1914	18th	Chalmers	Independent Liberal

Edward Clark was on the council of Palmerston. He was Mayor from 1904–1910 and 1919–1923.

Clark represented the Chalmers electorate in the New Zealand House of Representatives for six years from 1908 to 1914, when he retired.

Clark was an Independent Liberal for all of his parliamentary career.

Clark was a member of the Legislative Council from 25 June 1920 to his death in 1932. He served as Chairman of Committees in 1931 and 1932.

== Notes ==
New Zealand Parliament
Preceded by Edmund Allen	Member of Parliament for Chalmers; 1908–1914	Succeeded by James Dickson
Political offices
Preceded by John Barr	Chairman of Committees of the Legislative Council; 1931–1932	Succeeded by Josiah Hanan
