= John Stanley Monck =

Irish Anglican priest (1721/1722 – 1785)

John Stanley Monck (1721/2 – 4 April 1785) was an eighteenth century Irish Anglican priest. He was an uncle of Charles Monck, 1st Viscount Monck.

Monck was born in Dublin and educated at Trinity College, Dublin. He was the Archdeacon of Derry from 1774 until 1785.
