= Chairman of Committees (New Zealand Legislative Council) =

The Chairman of Committees was an elected position of the New Zealand Legislative Council. The role was established in 1865 and existed until the abolition of the Legislative Council. The roles of the Chairman of Committees were to deputise for the Speaker, and to chair the House when it was in committee. The role of Chairman of Committees also existed for the House of Representatives.

== Appointment ==
Initially, the Legislative Council elected its Chairman of Committees at the beginning of each parliamentary session, with the Legislative Council and the House of Representatives meeting at the same time. The Standing Orders were adjusted in 1928, providing for a three-year tenure in alignment with the electoral cycle of the House of Representatives.

== Office holders ==
The following is a list of Chairmen of Committees of the Legislative Council:

Key

Independent Liberal IPLL Reform Labour United
†: died in office

No.	Name	Portrait	Term of office	
1	Mathew Richmond		28 July 1865	16 July 1879
2	W. D. H. Baillie		16 July 1879	9 July 1902
3	William Cowper Smith		9 July 1902	8 July 1903
4	John Rigg		8 July 1903	6 July 1904
5	Richard Reeves		6 July 1904	5 July 1906
(3)	William Cowper Smith		5 July 1906	29 August 1906
(5)	Richard Reeves		29 August 1906	10 July 1907
(3)	William Cowper Smith		10 July 1907	8 July 1908
(5)	Richard Reeves		8 July 1908	1 June 1910†
6	Walter Carncross		6 July 1910	1 November 1918
7	Oliver Samuel		19 November 1918	11 January 1925†
8	John Barr		8 July 1925	7 December 1930†
9	Edward Henry Clark		19 March 1931	10 September 1932†
10	Josiah Hanan		7 October 1932	5 July 1939
11	Bernard Martin		5 July 1939	29 June 1948
12	Michael Connelly		7 July 1948	5 July 1950
13	Tom Bloodworth		5 July 1950	31 December 1950
