= Mount Pleasant, New Zealand =

Suburb of Christchurch, New Zealand

Mount Pleasant
- Suburb
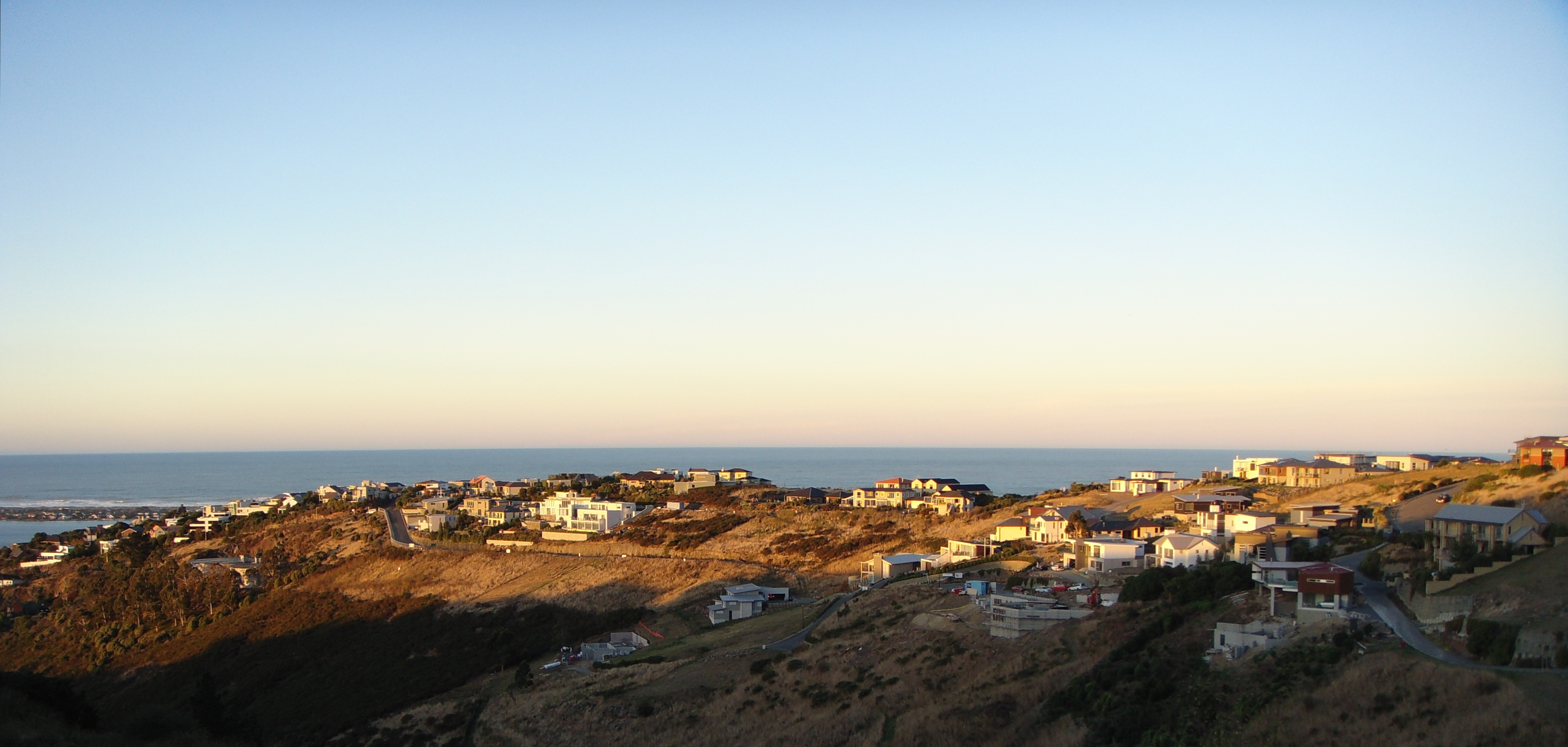
- Mount Pleasant in 2010
- Interactive map of Mount Pleasant
- Coordinates: 43.563°S 172.716°E
- Country: New Zealand
- City: Christchurch
- Local authority: Christchurch City Council
- Electoral ward: Heathcote
- Community board: Waihoro Spreydon-Cashmere-Heathcote

Area
  - Land: 248 ha (610 acres)

Population (June 2025)
  - Total: 4,050
  - Density: 1,630/km^{2} (4,230/sq mi)

	(Avon Heathcote Estuary)
Ferrymead	Mount Pleasant	Redcliffs
Heathcote Valley		Port Hills

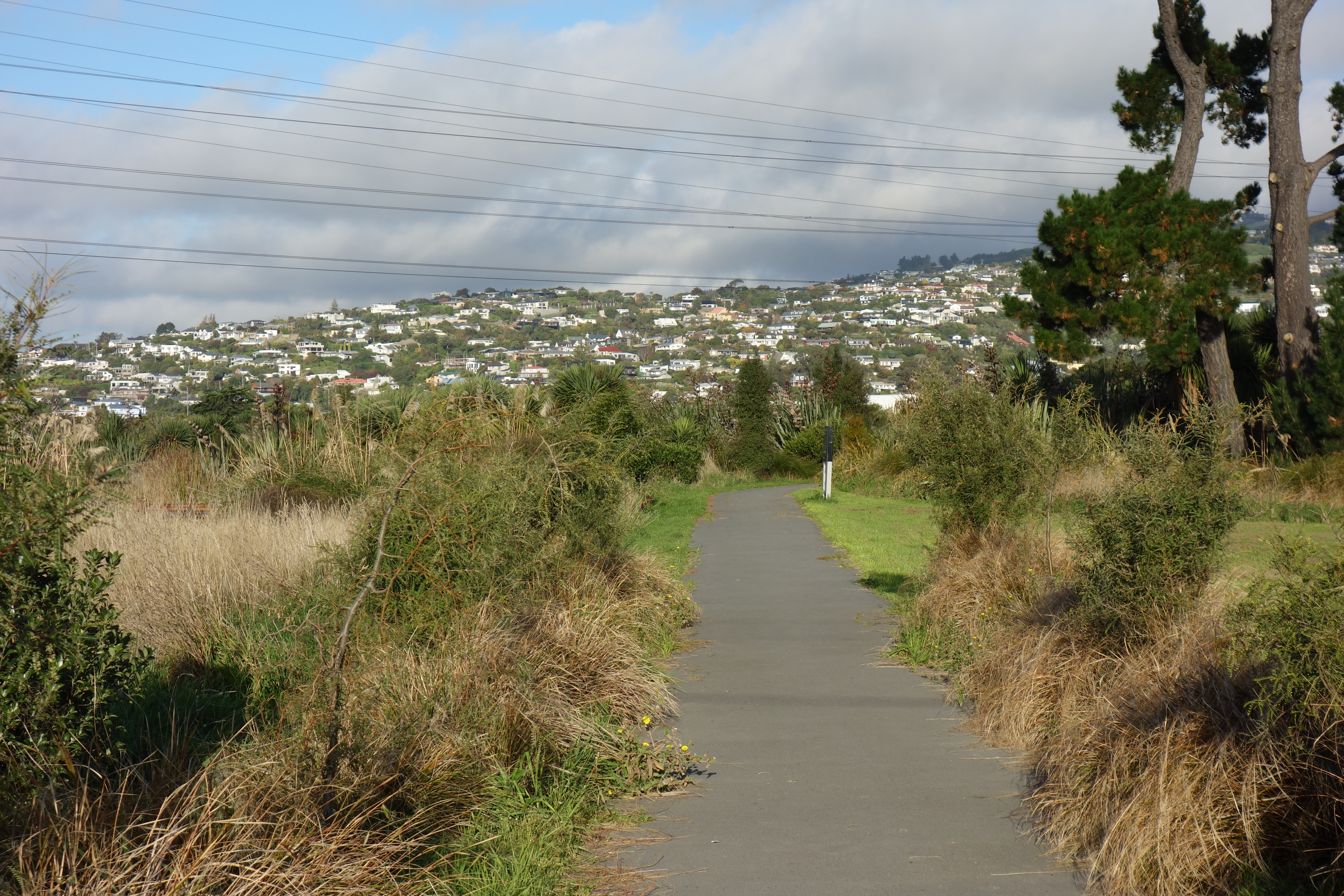
Mount Pleasant from the Christchurch 360 Trail

Mount Pleasant (Tauhinukorokio) is a coastal suburb of Christchurch, New Zealand. The suburb is located on the northern flank of the mountain Tauhinukorokio/Mount Pleasant in the Port Hills. It takes its name from the English version of the mountain's name.

The area was originally administered by the borough of Sumner. A petition in September 1920, by 57 of the suburb's 66 ratepayers, asked for it to be included as a riding of the Heathcote County. At the time of the petition, the area was mostly farmland, with 21 dwelling houses and an estimated population of 80. Whilst the mayor of Sumner, John Barr, submitted against the petition, it was granted and took effect on 1 April 1921. As a result of the 1989 local government reforms, Heathcote County was amalgamated with and became part of Christchurch City Council.

The suburb and its houses were extensively damaged in the 2011 Christchurch earthquake.

== Demographics ==
Mount Pleasant covers 2.48 km^{2} (0.96 sq mi). It had an estimated population of 4,050 as of June 2025, with a population density of 1,633 people per km^{2}.

Historical population
Year	Pop.	±% p.a.
2006	3,984	—
2013	3,024	−3.86%
2018	3,567	+3.36%
2023	3,903	+1.82%

Mount Pleasant had a population of 3,903 in the 2023 New Zealand census, an increase of 336 people (9.4%) since the 2018 census, and an increase of 879 people (29.1%) since the 2013 census. There were 1,911 males, 1,977 females, and 15 people of other genders in 1,578 dwellings. 3.4% of people identified as LGBTIQ+. The median age was 49.4 years (compared with 38.1 years nationally). There were 618 people (15.8%) aged under 15 years, 447 (11.5%) aged 15 to 29, 1,917 (49.1%) aged 30 to 64, and 921 (23.6%) aged 65 or older.

People could identify as more than one ethnicity. The results were 93.9% European (Pākehā); 6.4% Māori; 0.9% Pasifika; 3.7% Asian; 0.9% Middle Eastern, Latin American and African New Zealanders (MELAA); and 2.2% other, which includes people giving their ethnicity as "New Zealander". English was spoken by 97.5%, Māori by 1.4%, Samoan by 0.1%, and other languages by 11.3%. No language could be spoken by 1.7% (e.g. too young to talk). New Zealand Sign Language was known by 0.6%. The percentage of people born overseas was 25.1, compared with 28.8% nationally.

Religious affiliations were 28.2% Christian, 0.5% Hindu, 0.1% Islam, 0.5% Buddhist, 0.8% New Age, 0.1% Jewish, and 1.1% other religions. People who answered that they had no religion were 62.3%, and 6.5% of people did not answer the census question.

Of those at least 15 years old, 1,410 (42.9%) people had a bachelor's or higher degree, 1,479 (45.0%) had a post-high school certificate or diploma, and 396 (12.1%) people exclusively held high school qualifications. The median income was $53,500, compared with $41,500 nationally. 774 people (23.6%) earned over $100,000 compared to 12.1% nationally. The employment status of those at least 15 was 1,611 (49.0%) full-time, 552 (16.8%) part-time, and 54 (1.6%) unemployed.

== Education ==
Te Kura O Paeraki - Mt Pleasant School is a full primary school catering for years 1 to 8. It had a roll of 386 as of July 2026. The school started in a private house in 1928.

== Climate ==
The highest recorded temperature at Mount Pleasant is 39.3 °C (103 °F) recorded on 7 of February 1973.

Climate data for Mount Pleasant (1981–2010)
Month	Jan	Feb	Mar	Apr	May	Jun	Jul	Aug	Sep	Oct	Nov	Dec	Year
Mean daily maximum °C (°F)	21.2 (70.2)	20.6 (69.1)	19.4 (66.9)	16.9 (62.4)	14.2 (57.6)	11.9 (53.4)	10.9 (51.6)	11.9 (53.4)	14.0 (57.2)	16.0 (60.8)	17.6 (63.7)	19.6 (67.3)	16.2 (61.1)
Daily mean °C (°F)	17.2 (63.0)	16.9 (62.4)	15.6 (60.1)	13.5 (56.3)	11.1 (52.0)	8.8 (47.8)	8.0 (46.4)	8.7 (47.7)	10.4 (50.7)	12.2 (54.0)	13.7 (56.7)	15.6 (60.1)	12.6 (54.8)
Mean daily minimum °C (°F)	13.2 (55.8)	13.3 (55.9)	11.9 (53.4)	10.1 (50.2)	8.1 (46.6)	5.7 (42.3)	5.2 (41.4)	5.6 (42.1)	6.9 (44.4)	8.4 (47.1)	9.8 (49.6)	11.7 (53.1)	9.2 (48.5)
Average rainfall mm (inches)	37.2 (1.46)	46.5 (1.83)	42.6 (1.68)	46.9 (1.85)	60.9 (2.40)	57.5 (2.26)	72.2 (2.84)	69.5 (2.74)	43.3 (1.70)	54.9 (2.16)	54.0 (2.13)	69.9 (2.75)	655.4 (25.8)
Source: NIWA
