= John Monck (cricketer) =

New Zealand cricketer

Personal information
- Born: 28 February 1845; Reading, England
- Died: 3 September 1929 (aged 84); Christchurch, New Zealand
- Source: Cricinfo, 17 October 2020

John Stanley Monck (28 February 1845 – 3 September 1929) was a New Zealand farmer and cricketer. He played in one first-class match for Canterbury in 1873/74.

He was the second son of John Bligh Monck of Coley Park, and was educated at Bradfield College, Berkshire in England, from 1858 to 1861. In 1863 he travelled to New Zealand. In 1869 he bought the farm at Moncks Bay, near Christchurch, and was there for 40 years.

== See also ==
- List of Canterbury representative cricketers
