= Redcliffs =

Suburb of Christchurch, New Zealand

- Suburb
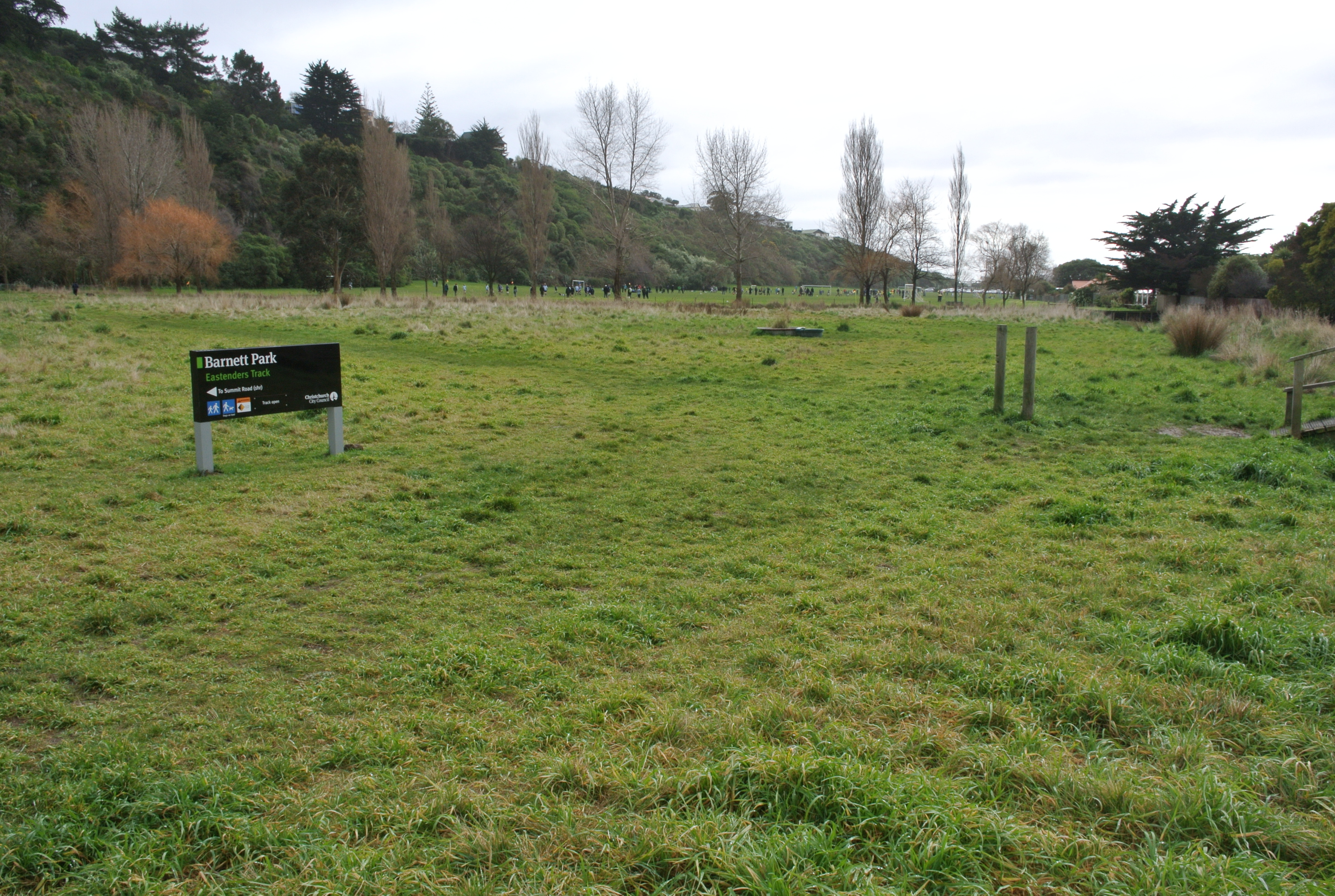
- Barnett Park
- Interactive map of Redcliffs
- Coordinates: 43.563°S 172.731°E
- Country: New Zealand
- City: Christchurch
- Local authority: Christchurch City Council
- Electoral ward: Heathcote
- Community board: Waihoro Spreydon-Cashmere-Heathcote

Area
  - Land: 185 ha (460 acres)

Population (June 2025)
  - Total: 2,150
  - Density: 1,160/km^{2} (3,010/sq mi)

	(Avon Heathcote Estuary / Ihutai)
Mount Pleasant	Redcliffs
Heathcote Valley	(Port Hills)	Moncks Bay

Redcliffs (Māori: Te Raekura) is an outer coastal suburb of Christchurch, Canterbury, New Zealand.

== History ==
The area of Redcliffs was first populated by humans about 700 years ago. In the 14th century, large groups of Māori, initially the Waitaha people and then the Ngāti Māmoe tribe, settled in the area. The Ngāi Tahu eventually displaced Ngāti Māmoe and were still living in the area when the first Europeans arrived.

The Māori name for the mudflats near the suburb is Ohikaparuparu, it is an important shellfish gathering site for Māori.

The Moa Bone Point Cave (Te Ana o Hineraki) in Redcliffs was excavated under the direction of Julius von Haast in 1872, and numerous artefacts were found. Many further investigations have been undertaken since that time. Artefacts found included moa bones and egg shells, bones of seals, birds and fish, shellfish and many Māori taonga. This suggests that Moa Bone Point Cave was used as shelter by the first Māori people but also used as a place to store valuable items.

Moncks Cave is another smaller cave located in Redcliffs. It was discovered by road workers in 1889, and is considered to be one of the greatest archaeological sites in New Zealand because of the evidence that it has provided of early Māori occupation, including wooden artefacts.

== Location ==
The suburb is most directly accessed from the city centre by a causeway that crosses the Avon Heathcote Estuary and is the suburb immediately before Sumner. Alternatively, Redcliffs can be accessed through McCormack's Bay Road, which circles the perimeter of the Avon Heathcote Estuary. The coastal road from Redcliffs to Sumner allows for further access to the port and suburb of Lyttelton and the Port Hills, and an alternative—if long—route to the city centre.

== Geology ==
Redcliffs is characterised by rocky, hilly geography and has many natural caves in its sides. The domineering cliffs of Redcliffs are a snapshot of the region's volcanic origins. The cliffs are tinged with veins of red tephra, and composed of 'A'ā lava flows; the suburb draws its name from this the most notable of its physical features.

== Demographics ==
Redcliffs covers 1.85 km^{2} (0.71 sq mi). It had an estimated population of 2,150 as of June 2025, with a population density of 1,162 people per km^{2}.

Historical population
Year	Pop.	±% p.a.
2006	2,079	—
2013	1,776	−2.23%
2018	1,971	+2.11%
2023	2,058	+0.87%

Redcliffs had a population of 2,058 in the 2023 New Zealand census, an increase of 87 people (4.4%) since the 2018 census, and an increase of 282 people (15.9%) since the 2013 census. There were 999 males, 1,053 females, and 3 people of other genders in 891 dwellings. 2.9% of people identified as LGBTIQ+. The median age was 52.0 years (compared with 38.1 years nationally). There were 270 people (13.1%) aged under 15 years, 252 (12.2%) aged 15 to 29, 993 (48.3%) aged 30 to 64, and 546 (26.5%) aged 65 or older.

People could identify as more than one ethnicity. The results were 92.4% European (Pākehā); 7.0% Māori; 0.4% Pasifika; 4.8% Asian; 1.9% Middle Eastern, Latin American and African New Zealanders (MELAA); and 2.3% other, which includes people giving their ethnicity as "New Zealander". English was spoken by 97.7%, Māori by 1.3%, Samoan by 0.1%, and other languages by 13.1%. No language could be spoken by 1.9% (e.g. too young to talk). New Zealand Sign Language was known by 0.7%. The percentage of people born overseas was 26.2, compared with 28.8% nationally.

Religious affiliations were 31.3% Christian, 0.3% Hindu, 0.7% Islam, 0.3% Māori religious beliefs, 0.7% Buddhist, 0.6% New Age, and 1.2% other religions. People who answered that they had no religion were 58.7%, and 6.1% of people did not answer the census question.

Of those at least 15 years old, 747 (41.8%) people had a bachelor's or higher degree, 834 (46.6%) had a post-high school certificate or diploma, and 216 (12.1%) people exclusively held high school qualifications. The median income was $50,500, compared with $41,500 nationally. 387 people (21.6%) earned over $100,000 compared to 12.1% nationally. The employment status of those at least 15 was 816 (45.6%) full-time, 303 (16.9%) part-time, and 18 (1.0%) unemployed.

== Recreation ==
Barnett Park, open to public access, and a product of the earliest council recreation planning in the wider Christchurch region, is located in Redcliffs. The suburb also hosts a bowling green, and a smaller park adjacent to the estuary which bears the suburb's name, Redcliffs Park.

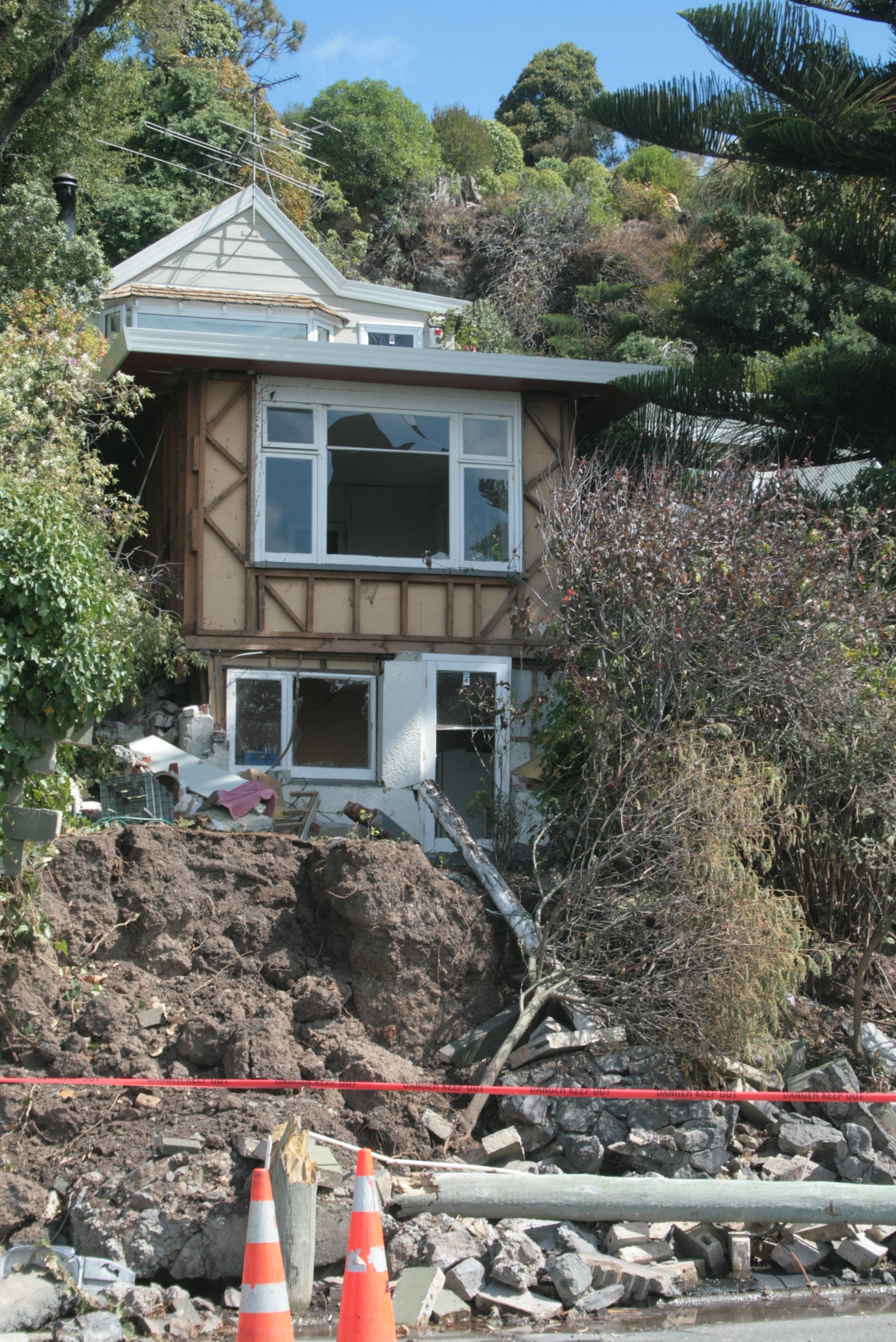
Earthquake damage to a house in Redcliffs

== 2011 Christchurch earthquake ==
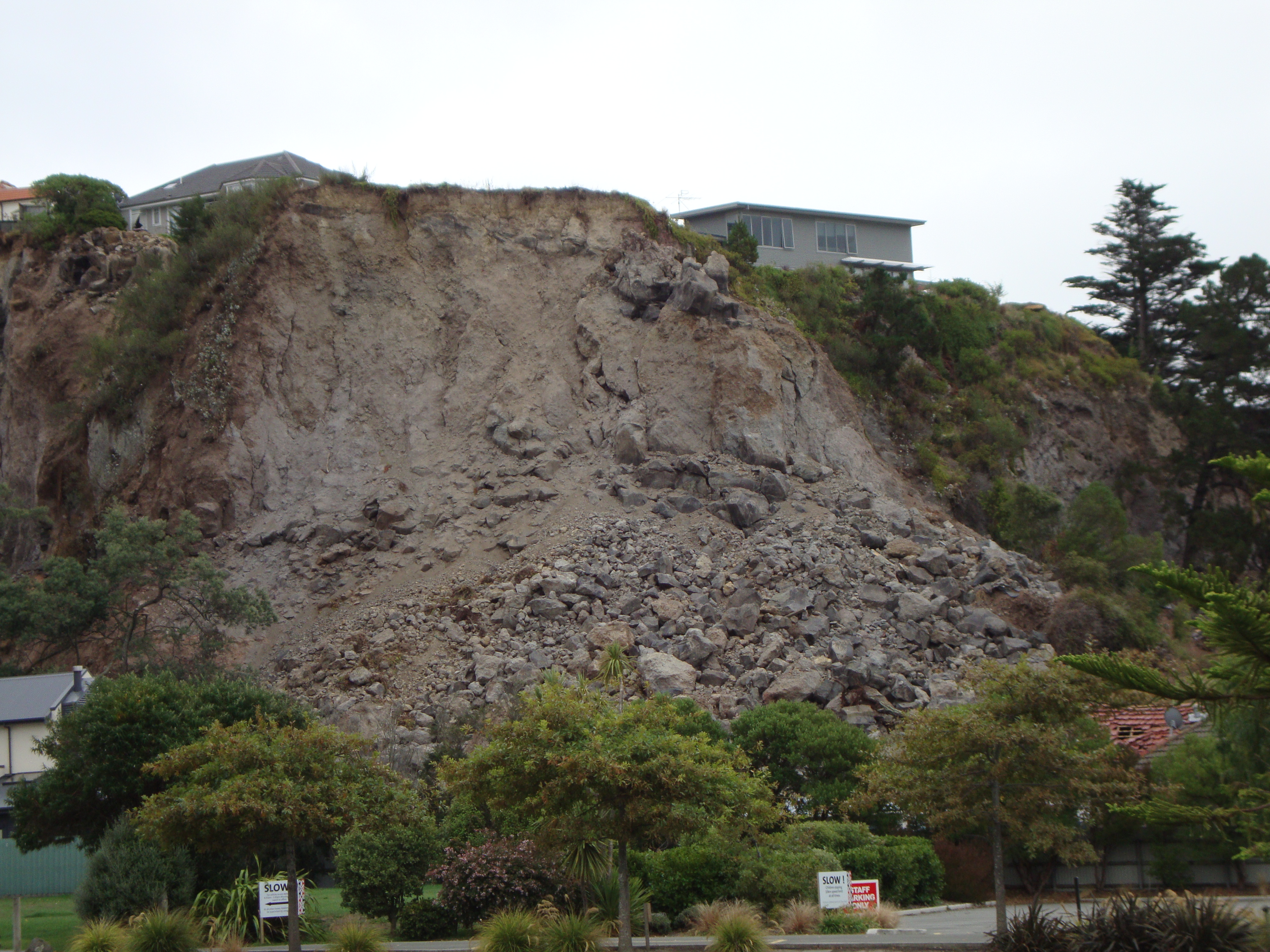
A landslide against the cliffs beside Redcliffs School, occurring from the 2011 Christchurch earthquake

In contrast to the September 2010 earthquake, Redcliffs and the surrounding hills suffered significant damage in the 22 February 2011 earthquake. Dozens of houses were deemed unliveable and hundreds more damaged. There was a large scale evacuation of several streets in Redcliffs at 10pm on Thursday, 24 February after some cliffs surrounding Redcliffs were deemed unstable. The following morning, a few streets or partial streets remained cordoned off but many people were able to return to their homes immediately.

By 7 March, detailed geotechnical inspections of the affected land inside the remaining cordons began with a view to removing them. They were removed on 8 March.

Redcliffs citizens launched a local information centre on 26 February, followed by a regular newsletter from 27 February, followed by two support websites.

On 2 March, Redcliffs resident Peter Hyde launched a viral call to encourage more support, especially key supplies and information, for the worst affected Eastern suburbs of Christchurch. In particular those to the north of Redcliffs such as Parklands, Aranui, Bromley, Avonside, Bexley and New Brighton.

=== Redcliffs School ===
Te Raekura Redcliffs School is a full primary school catering for years 1 to 8. It had a roll of 253 as of July 2026.

The school opened in 1907. It was temporarily relocated to Van Asch Deaf Education Centre, 4.5 kilometres (2.8 mi) from the original Main Road site, after the June 2011 aftershock. This decision came after concerns of the safety of pupils as the cliffs behind the school became unstable. In 2015 and 2016, Redcliffs School faced the risk of closure due to the risk of further disruption. After community backlash, it was decided to build a new site in Redcliffs Park, across the road from the original site. The new site was opened in June 2020.
