= Tauhinukorokio / Mount Pleasant =

Mountain in Canterbury, New Zealand

- Tauhinu Korokio (Māori)
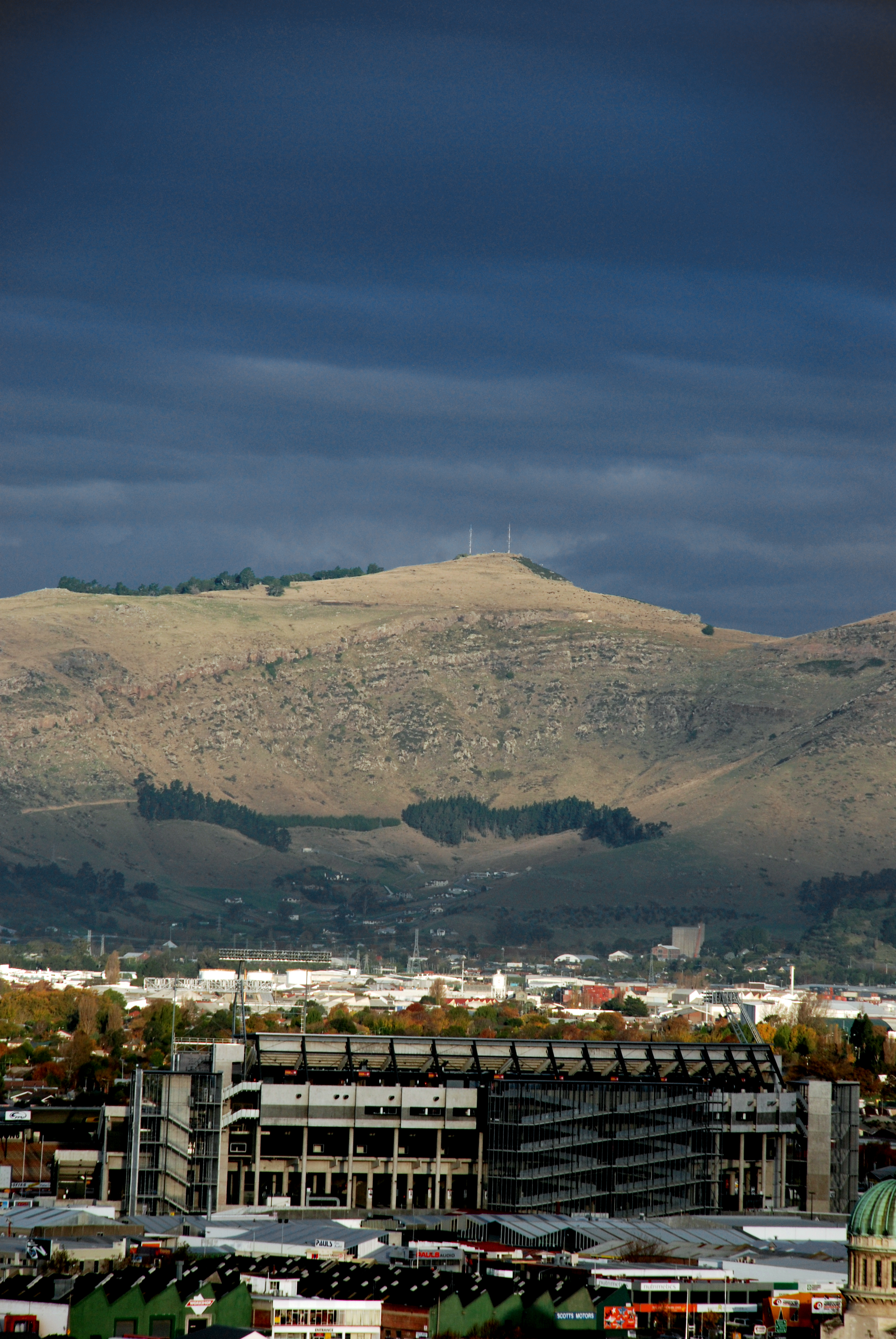
- A view of Mount Pleasant with AMI Stadium in the foreground (From Hotel Grand Chancellor, demolished after the 2011 Christchurch earthquake)

Highest point
- Elevation: 499 m (1,637 ft)
- Coordinates: 43°35′20″S 172°43′38″E

Geography
- Location within Banks Peninsula
- Location: Christchurch
- Parent range: Port Hills

Geology
- Mountain type: Basalt volcanic rock

Tauhinukorokio / Mount Pleasant (Māori: Tauhinu Korokio), also known just as either Mount Pleasant or Tauhinukorokio individually, is the highest elevation in the eastern Port Hills in Christchurch, New Zealand. It once held a Māori pā, but there was little left of it when European settlers first arrived in the 1840s. The hill was first used as a sheep run, and became the base trig station for the survey of Canterbury. It was also used as a signal station to make residents aware of ships coming into Lyttelton Harbour / Whakaraupō. During World War II, an extensive heavy anti-aircraft artillery (HAA) battery was built near the summit, and the foundations of those buildings still exist.

== Geography ==
Mount Pleasant / Tauhinukorokio is located in the Port Hills and is 499 metres (1,637 ft) high. On its northern slope is the Christchurch suburb of Mount Pleasant, and on its southern side is Lyttelton Harbour / Whakaraupō.

== Etymology ==
The Māori name of the hill is Tauhinu Korokio, which refers to two native plants. The first, Tauhinu, is a cottonwood (Ozothamnus leptophyllus) of the genus Ozothamnus. Korokio is a densely branched Cotoneaster (Corokia cotoneaster). The New Zealand Geographic Board officially changed the name to Tauhinukorokio / Mount Pleasant in September 1948, which was gazetted in the New Zealand Gazette 1949 on page 858.

The European name was given by crew of HMS Pegasus when the coastal survey of Canterbury was undertaken in 1809. Joseph Thomas, the chief surveyor of the Canterbury Association, climbed the mountain in late 1848 immediately after arriving in Canterbury, and although being aware of the European name, renamed the hill Mount Cavendish in honour of Lord Richard Cavendish, a member of the management committee of the Canterbury Association. The name did not come into common use and was eventually transferred to an adjacent hill.

== History ==
The hill once held a Kāti Māmoe pā. Approximately 300 years ago, it was overtaken by Te Rakiwhakaputa of Ngāi Tahu. When the first European settlers arrived, the remains of the pā could still be seen a little to the north of the peak.

Captain Thomas, chief surveyor for the Canterbury Association, chose the hill as the base trig station for the survey of the Canterbury settlement.

The first European to farm on the mountain was Joseph Greenwood of Purau, who took up land in 1846 and built a stockman's hut near the peak. When Greenwood left for Motunau in May 1847, he sold the land to Rhodes brothers (William Barnard and George). Edward Ward, the eldest brother of Crosbie Ward, was one of the Pilgrims. On his first day in New Zealand, having arrived on the Charlotte Jane, he climbed Mount Pleasant to get a view of the Canterbury Plains. He stood by the hut built by Charles Crawford, who was managing Mount Pleasant for the Rhodes brothers, when he remarked the following:

All around the soil teemed with vegetable productions – wild oats, ripe sowthistle, plantain, groundsel & other plants grew large and strong. There was a track of a running stream hard by, but springs everywhere. I could have wished much to have bought the house and all, just as it stood. It faced the N.E. and the first point of the land where it meets the River Heathcote. Being rather too high upon the hill was its only disadvantage.

Ward did buy Ōtamahua / Quail Island instead, but drowned together with his brother Henry in Lyttelton Harbour in June 1851.

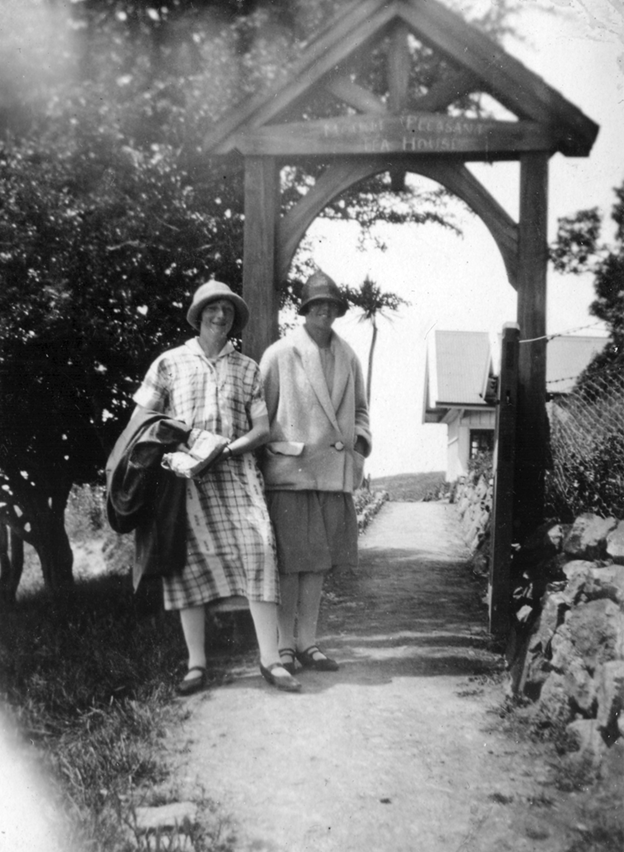
Mt Pleasant Tea House

Major Alfred Hornbrook arrived in Lyttelton in September 1849 and was well established by the time the first wave of settlers (called 'The Pilgrims') arrived on the First Four Ships in December 1850. With the profits that Hornbrook made from his hotel and trading post, he bought Mount Pleasant from the Rhodes brothers in March 1852. Major Hornbrook is described as a rather eccentric person, but his public-spirited character also saw him signalling all ships arriving into Lyttelton Harbour / Whakaraupō from the top of Mount Pleasant. Through a public subscription in 1853, a telescope, flagstaff and a set of flags were paid for. The walking track from adjacent Mount Cavendish down into Lyttelton township was Major Hornbrook's route for getting provisions to his hut on top of Mount Pleasant, and it is still known as Major Hornbrook's Track. Hornbrook went bankrupt in 1871 at a time when he owned 47,000 sheep across three stations (his Mount Pleasant run had 6,000 sheep), and the land was sold to Richard May Morten and William White. Morten and White dissolved their partnership in 1879 and put up the land for auction. Both of them bid for it, and Morten purchased the 6,000 acres (2,400 ha) at £6 per acre.

After Morten's death, on 20 August 1909, the land (by then 6,500 acres (2,600 ha) and stretching along the hills from Godley Head to St. Martins) was subdivided. After various bequests of land and reserves, including some for the Summit Road, were made, the homestead block and 36 section of various sizes for building sites and small farms were put up for auction on 23 March 1912. The largest remaining block had 1,500 acres (610 ha), was owned by J. S. Scott and later on his son Peter Scott, and stretched from Mount Pleasant to the Rapaki Track.

The old Hornbrook homestead just below the summit burned down just before World War I, and tearooms and accommodation opened in March 1914 on the site. The buildings, no longer accessible to the public, are still present and are located just above the junction where Mount Pleasant Road meets the Summit Road.

Between late 1942 and early 1943, a heavy anti-aircraft artillery (HAA) battery was established near the summit. A total of 91 buildings were erected, and the battery was staffed between January 1943 and September 1944. It was never used in combat.

After the Second World War the New Zealand Post Office used the peak for land mobile radio services.
