= Marleys Hill =

Hill peak in the Port Hills above Christchurch, New Zealand

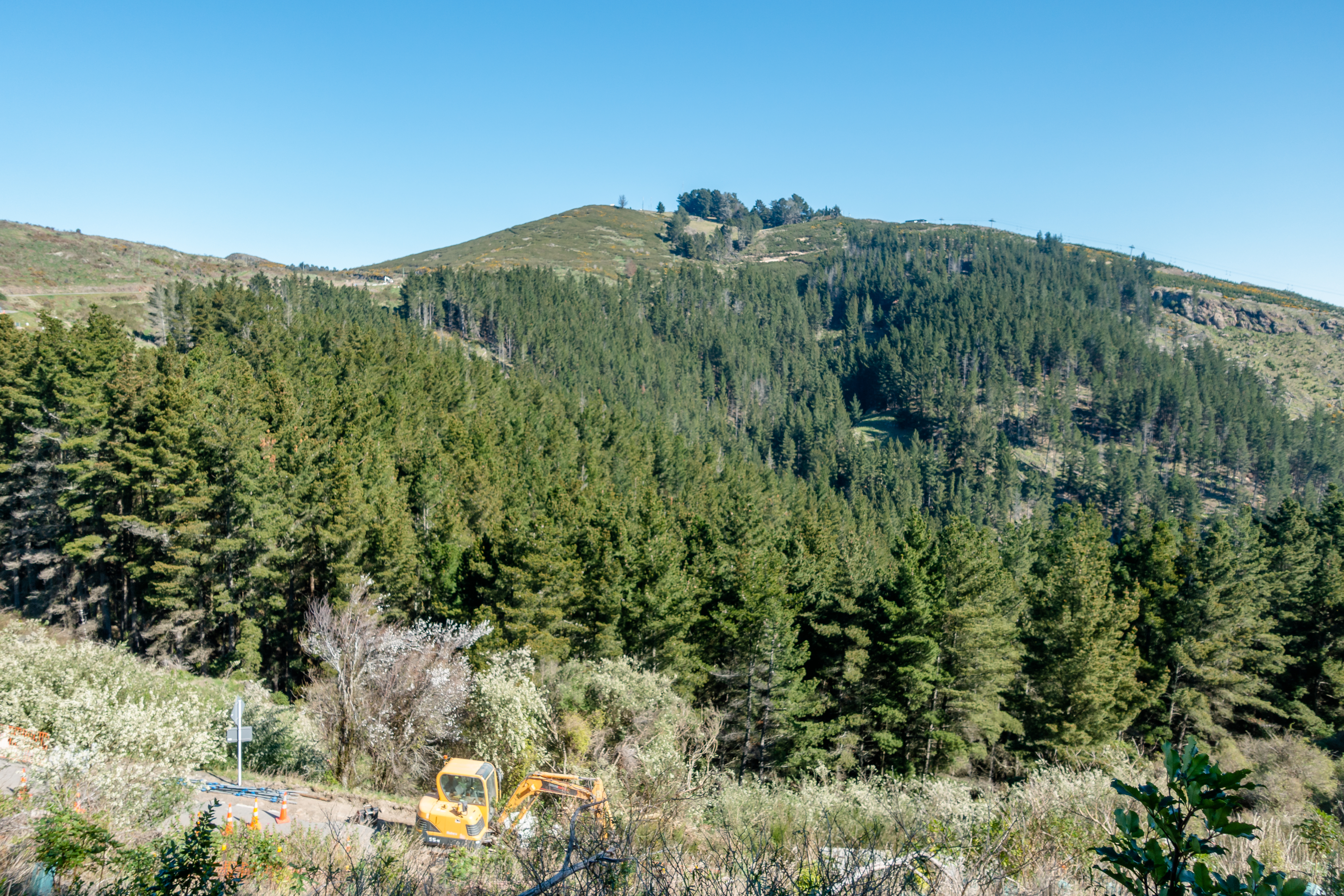
- Marleys Hill in 2021

Highest point
- Elevation: 502 m (1,647 ft)
- Coordinates: 43°36′37.699″S 172°38′1.601″E

Geography
- Location within Banks Peninsula
- Location: Christchurch
- Parent range: Port Hills

Geology
- Mountain type: Basalt volcanic rock

Marleys Hill is a hill in the Port Hills above Christchurch, New Zealand. It is a short distance south-west of Sugarloaf, and is taller than it by a few metres. The hilltop is the location of several radio repeater stations, including the primary amateur radio repeater for Christchurch. On the north side of the hill is the Christchurch Adventure Park.

== History ==
Marleys Hill was a key location for the collection of stone for building in early Christchurch, with a quarry situated on the south side of the hill as early as 1859. The hill is named after William Marley — a carpenter and architect who arrived on the ship Charlotte Jane and owned land close to the summit.

Between 1927 and 1977 there was a nursing home near the summit called Mary's Mount Rest Home, operated by the Sisters of Calvary Hospital.

The hill was subjected to significant damage in both the 2017 Port Hills fires and the later 2024 Port Hills fire, including the loss of several radio transmitters at the top of the hill.
