= 2017 Port Hills fires =

Two New Zealand wildfires during February of that year

Port Hills fires
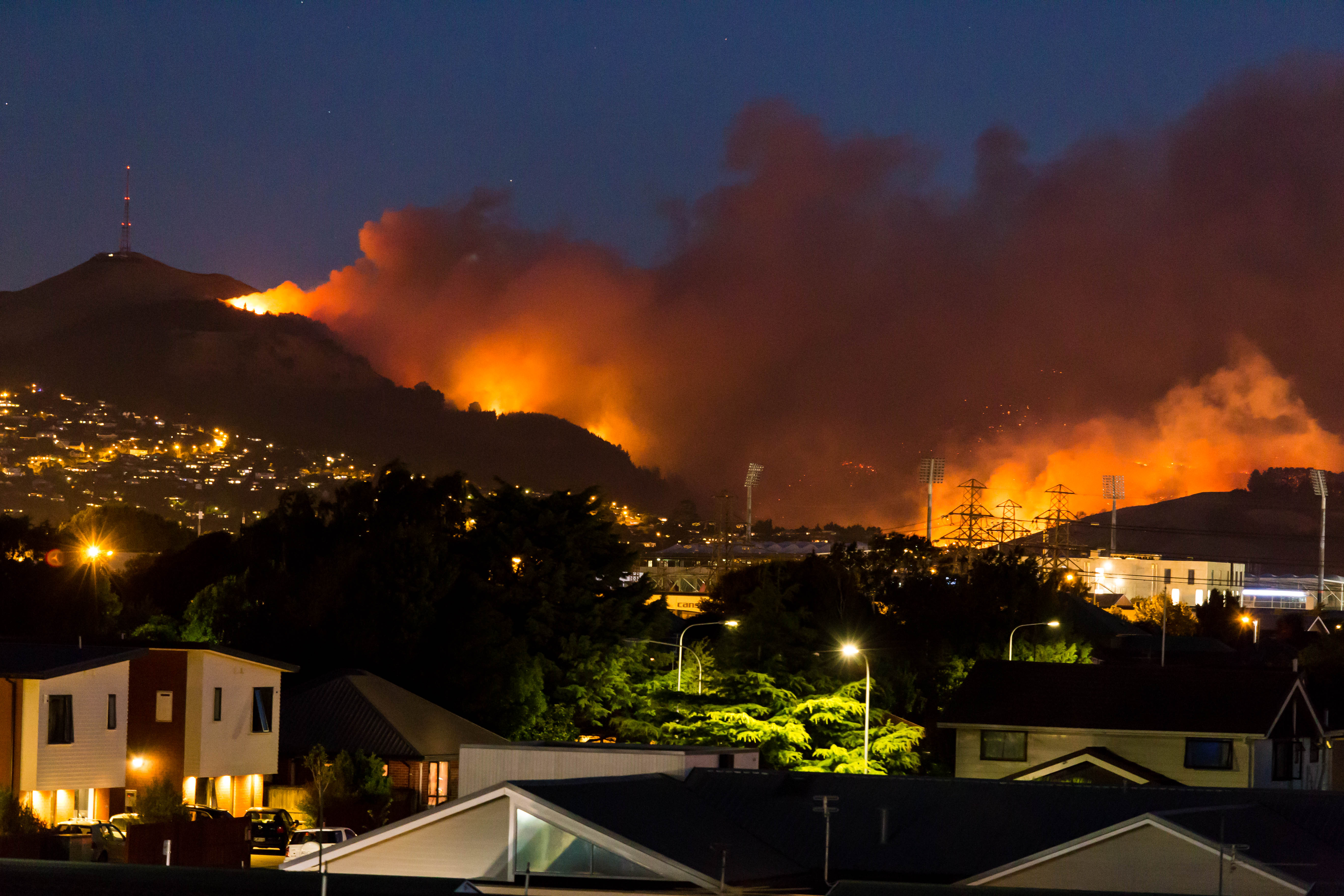
- View of Cashmere on Wednesday evening, with Sugarloaf on the left
- Date: 13 February 2017 – 20 April 2017
- Location: Port Hills, Christchurch and Selwyn District, New Zealand

Statistics
- Burned area: 2,075 hectares (5,130 acres)

Impacts
- Deaths: 1
- Injuries: 3
- Structures destroyed: 11 homes; 2 outbuildings; 0 commercial property

Ignition
- Cause: Suspected arson

The 2017 Port Hills fires were wildfires in the Port Hills of Christchurch, New Zealand. Two separate fires, several kilometres apart, started on Monday afternoon on 13 February 2017. By Wednesday night the fire was spread by the Christchurch Adventure Park chairlift and had combined to one large area. A helicopter crashed helping to fight the fires, causing the death of the pilot. Nine houses were destroyed and a further two were significantly damaged by the fires, and hundreds of residents were evacuated. The cause is officially undetermined, but it is now known the Early Valley Road fire was caused by an electrical fault, while the Summit Road fire was deliberately lit.

On 14 February 2024 a similar fire started in the same area, triggering a state of emergency, a major deployment of firefighting helicopters, and evacuations of nearby houses. Lessons learned from the 2017 fire contributed to the official response and strategy for the new fire.

== Timeline ==
=== Monday, 13 February ===
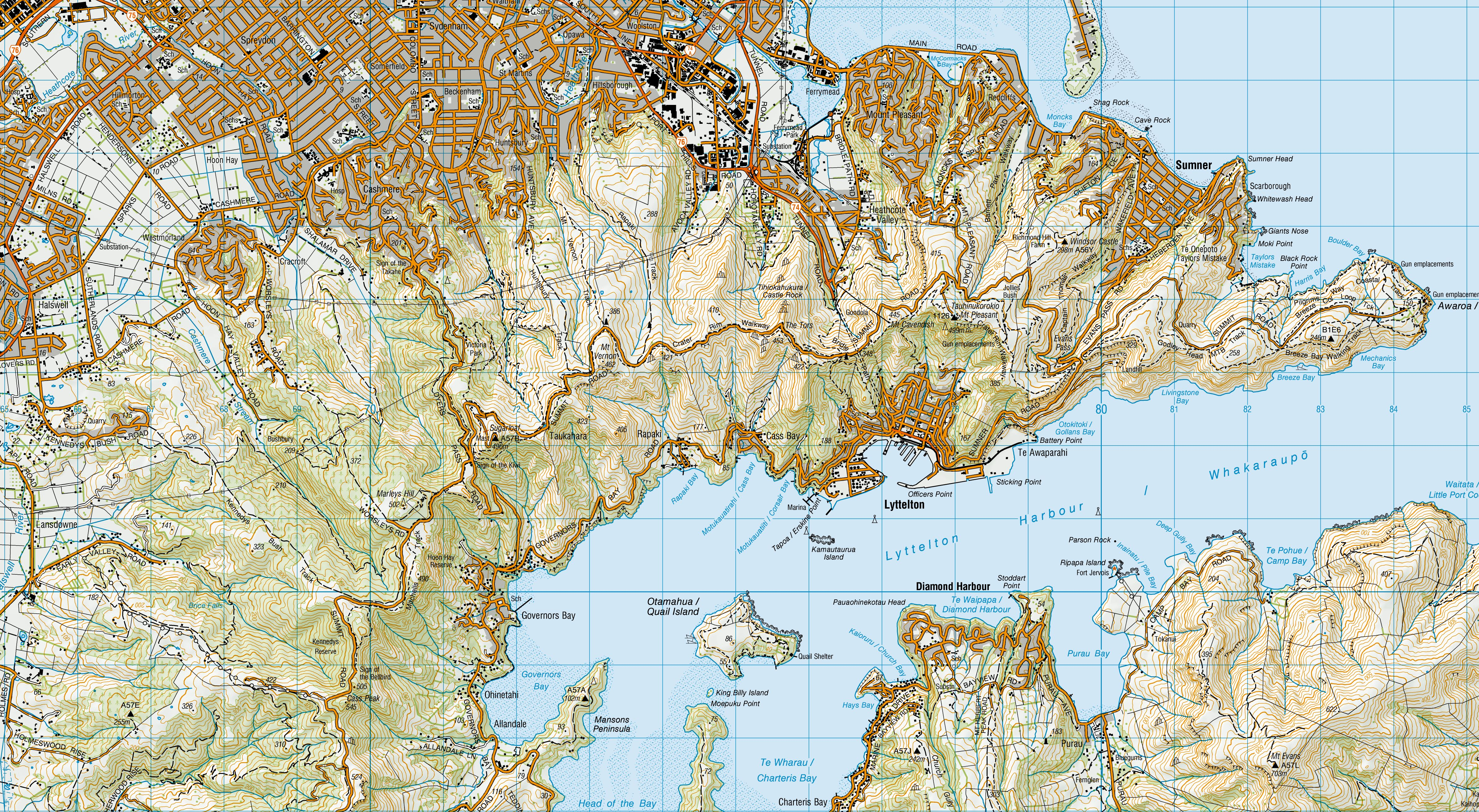
The source locations of the two fires

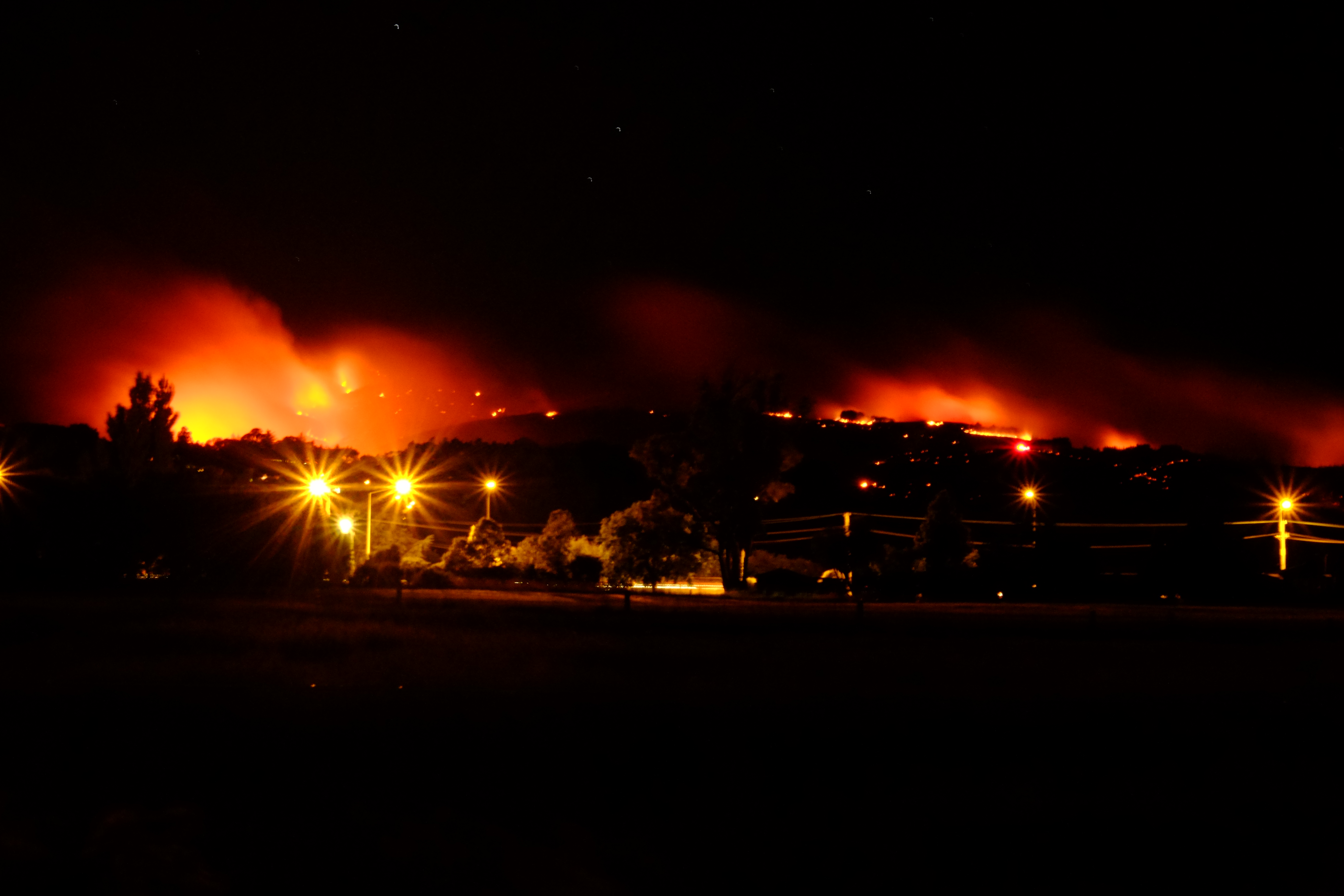
The fires during the first evening

A fire started on Monday afternoon in Early Valley Road in Lansdowne near Halswell and Tai Tapu. The Fire Service were alerted to the fire at 5:45pm. Subsequent computer modelling put the ignition time of the fire between 5:34pm and 5:36pm. Lansdowne is the eastern extreme of Selwyn District, and the Selwyn Rural Fire Authority assumed control in fighting the fire. Early on, a house on Early Valley Road burned down.

A second fire broke out several kilometres further east on Marleys Hill next to the Summit Road near Dyers Pass; (Note: This was reported as "3 km east of the Lansdowne Valley fire" but from the end of Early Valley Road to the top of Marleys Hill is just over 4 km "as the crow flies") this fire was reported 90 minutes after the previous one. Landmarks nearby include the Sign of the Kiwi, the new Christchurch Adventure Park, Victoria Park, and the communications tower on Sugarloaf. Although the second fire was located in the area controlled by Christchurch City Council, the response to both fires was controlled and co-ordinated by the Selwyn Rural Fire Authority. The Christchurch Adventure Park closed at 7:00 pm due to high winds and the nearby fire. A low number of residents located on Summit Road and that part of Worsleys Road that starts at the Summit Road were evacuated.

=== Tuesday, 14 February ===
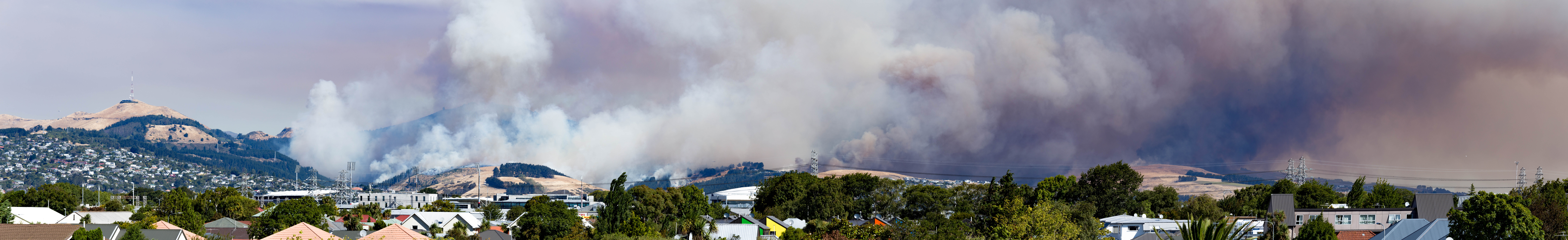
The fires on Tuesday afternoon

The fire service used more than a dozen helicopters with monsoon buckets to douse the flames with water, and some fixed wing planes to spray fire retardants. In the early afternoon, a helicopter fighting the fires crashed, killing the pilot and sole occupant Steve Askin. Askin was a former member of the New Zealand Special Air Service and in 2014 had been awarded the Gallantry Star, New Zealand's second highest military decoration, for exceptional bravery during service in the war in Afghanistan, and during the 2011 Intercontinental Hotel siege in Kabul. The interim report from the Transport Accident Investigation Commission (TAIC) released in May 2017 suggested the Eurocopter AS350 Écureuil crashed after the empty monsoon bucket swung back and was entangled in the tail rotor.

During Tuesday, the fire went into the grounds of the Christchurch Adventure Park, coming "dangerously close" to the top station of the chairlift. At one point, the fire service stated that the two fires were contained, with crews monitoring the fires and not much activity expected due to low winds. By Tuesday, the fire had burned covered 548 hectares (1,350 acres) on Early Valley Road, and 36 hectares (89 acres) on Marleys Hill.

After dark on Tuesday the fire tracked southwestwards from the summit road down the spur and two valleys towards Governors Bay, reaching its nearest point to the main road above Ohinetahi. This forced the evacuation of some properties above the Main Road including the church, but this fire front was extinguished without damage to property.

=== Wednesday, 15 February ===
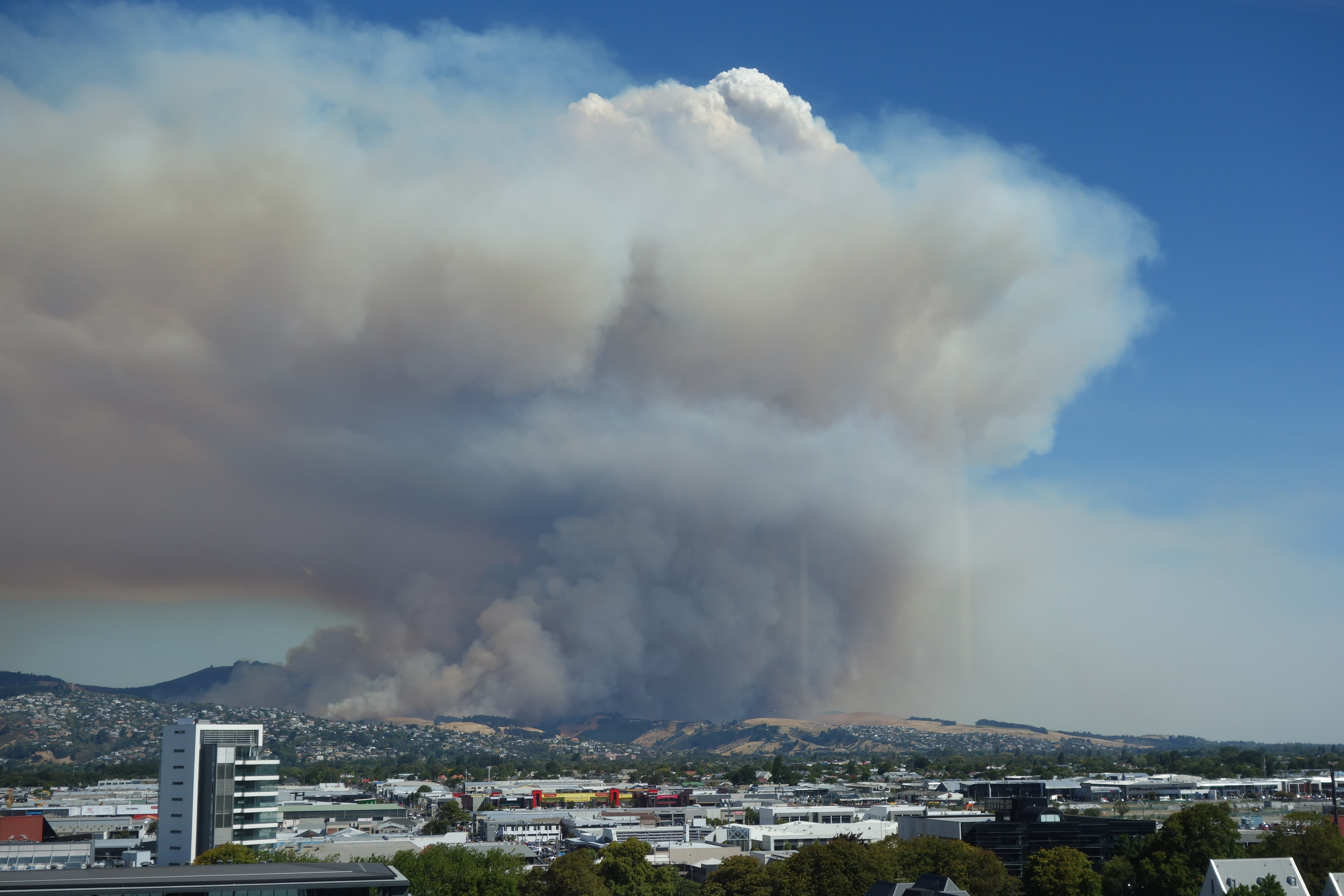
The Port Hills fires on Wednesday afternoon

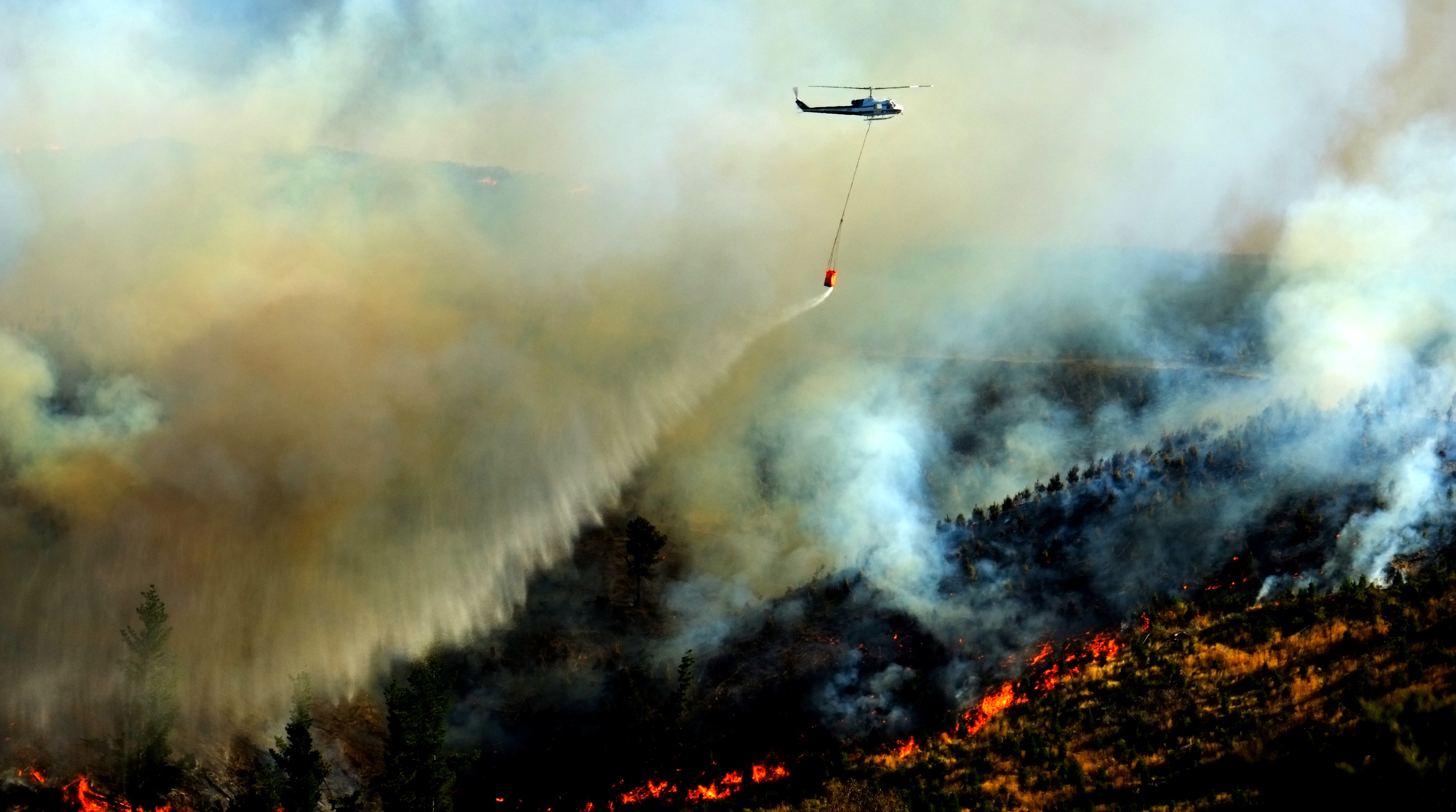
Fire fighting on day three in the early evening

During Wednesday, the fire spread and by 10am, about 1,000 hectares (2,500 acres) had burned. About 89,000 Christchurch residents lost power in the afternoon for half an hour after the smoke and flames caused a Transpower 220 kV line to trip; this also shut down the city council's water pump stations and fire fighters lost water access from fire hydrants. A shift in wind during the day made the situation volatile and accelerated the spread of the fire. Around 4 pm, some of the pilots witnessed a fire tornado near Halswell Quarry that reached a height of around 100 metres (330 ft). At 6:30 pm, a state of emergency under the Civil Defence Emergency Management Act 2002 was declared. Winds up to 45 kilometres per hour (28 mph) created favourable conditions for the fire. Approximately 1000 people were forced to evacuate their homes, including in the suburbs of Cashmere, Westmorland, Kennedys Bush, and along Worsleys Road. In the evening, Civil Defence reported that 40 houses had burned down, but the statement was quickly retracted and that instead, three houses had been lost. Many roads within the Port Hills area were closed to give unhindered access to emergency services, undisrupted by onlookers. At 9 pm, the fire jumped across Dyers Pass Road and went into Victoria Park, prompting authorities to order the evacuation above the Sign of the Takahe. Over night, the originally separate fires merged into one, and fire fighters battled at ten separate fire fronts.

During the day, the fire had burned down the hill within the Christchurch Adventure Park, and four to six fire service crews moved in at 9 pm to try to save the park's village, which includes a 180-seat café and bar, and the base station for the chairlift.

=== Thursday, 16 February ===
In the 24 hours from Wednesday morning to Thursday morning, the fire had doubled in size to over 2,000 hectares (4,900 acres). As aerial fire fighting can only happen during daylight hours, one of the Worsley Road property owners who had been evacuated thought that his house was safe, as he could see it from the bottom of the hill, but it caught fire and also burned to the ground while he was watching from afar.

=== Week 2: 20–26 February ===
Residents in the Hoon Hay Valley were allowed to return to their properties on Wednesday, 22 February.

Insurance companies put a temporary freeze on new policies. Insurance Australia Group (IAG), for example, issued a moratorium for properties with postcodes 7672, 8022, 8025, and 8971, and this covered some Christchurch suburbs on the flat several kilometres away from the Port Hills.

=== Thursday, 20 April ===
The fire was officially declared extinguished, after 66 days.

== Cause ==
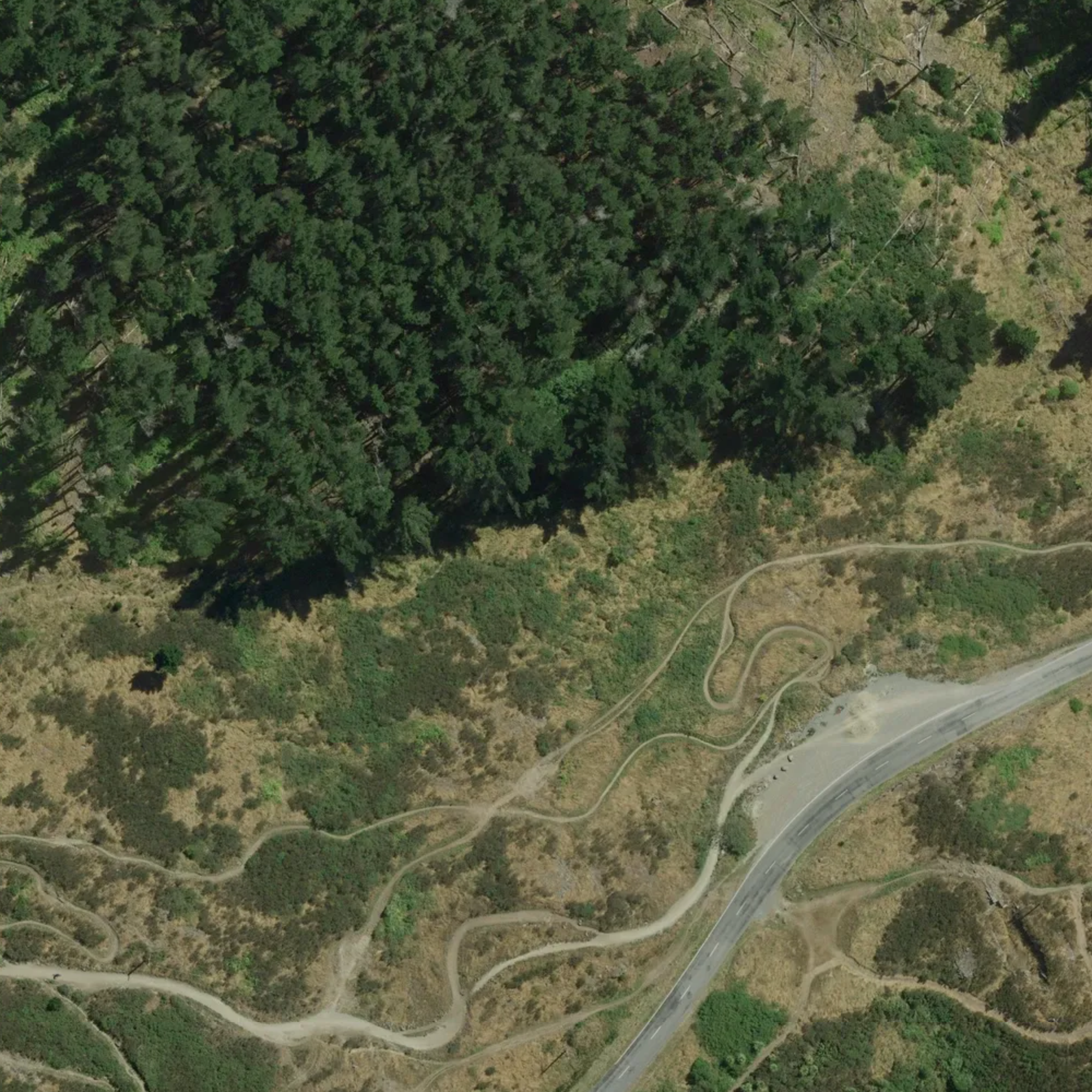
Aerial image centred on exact ignition point of 2017 Marleys Hill fire at 43.60938231°S 172.63980843°E. Summit Road is visible in the bottom-right.

The cause of the Early Valley Road fire remains undetermined, while the source of the Marleys Hill fire was unknown. The first opinion on the cause was offered by the Prime Minister, Bill English, when he visited the site on Thursday and declared that two fires starting at about the same time "looks a bit suspicious". A day later, an Orion (electricity distributor) fire investigator Ken Legat told Newstalk ZB that it's "certainly suspicious". As a death had resulted from the fire, the investigation would be led by police, and the Canterbury district commander, John Price, stated that there is no evidence as yet of any arson, and calling the fires suspicious would be a "quantum leap".

The cause of the Early Valley fire remains undetermined, but is alleged to be due to an electrical fault on a power pole. The origin of the fire has been determined to be a 5 m^{2} (54 sq ft) area directly behind a power pole. Investigation showed that there were electrical faults recorded around the time, however these faults could have been a result of ionised air with a lower breakdown voltage due to the fire already burning below. Subsequent evidence uncovered in 2020 indicated evidence of electric arcing and melted aluminium on the pole in a way that is unlikely to be explained by fire damage. However, due to a lack of evidence on the exact timing of these events, the cause is officially undetermined. Evidence suggests that the second fire at Marleys Hill was arson, with no alternative source of ignition identified.

In 2018 FENZ released a statement that they believe the fires were lit deliberately, but that the cause was officially undetermined due to a lack of evidence. The investigation to identify a possible perpetrator remains with Police.

== Criticism of responses ==
A person who owns a forestry block in Holmes Road in Tai Tapu reportedly called the Fire Service three times and asked for helicopters to fight the fire, but was told on all occasions that helicopters were on standby. It took over an hour before helicopters were engaged, by which time the Early Valley Road fire had well established itself. Christchurch Metro commander Dave Stackhouse and Selwyn District principal fire officer Doug Marshall did not want to comment when asked why it took so long for fire crews to respond to residents' calls for help. Gerry Brownlee, the Minister of Civil Defence, was critical of the authorities as to why a rural agency was in charge of coordinating the response to fighting a fire located mostly in Christchurch City Council's area. Brownlee was "perplexed" why it took 48 hours to declare a civil emergency.

== Adventure Park chair lift and lawsuit ==
Following the fires, video evidence emerged of the Christchurch Adventure Park chair lift appearing to start spot fires below the chair lift line. The Adventure Park had kept the chair lift running throughout the fires. The chairs appeared to catch fire and subsequently start new fires as they returned to the bottom of the park. The Adventure Park said the chair lift was left running to limit damage to the haul line and that operating it during fire events was standard operating procedure; however they had left the flammable plastic chairs on the haul rope. Following the release of the Fire Service Operational Review which noted the chair lift did spread the fire into residential properties, insurer IAG filed a lawsuit against the Adventure Park to recover the costs of damages caused to policy holders due to the chair lift fires.

== See also ==
- List of natural disasters in New Zealand
- List of wildfires
