= Christchurch Adventure Park =

Mountain biking park in Christchurch, New Zealand

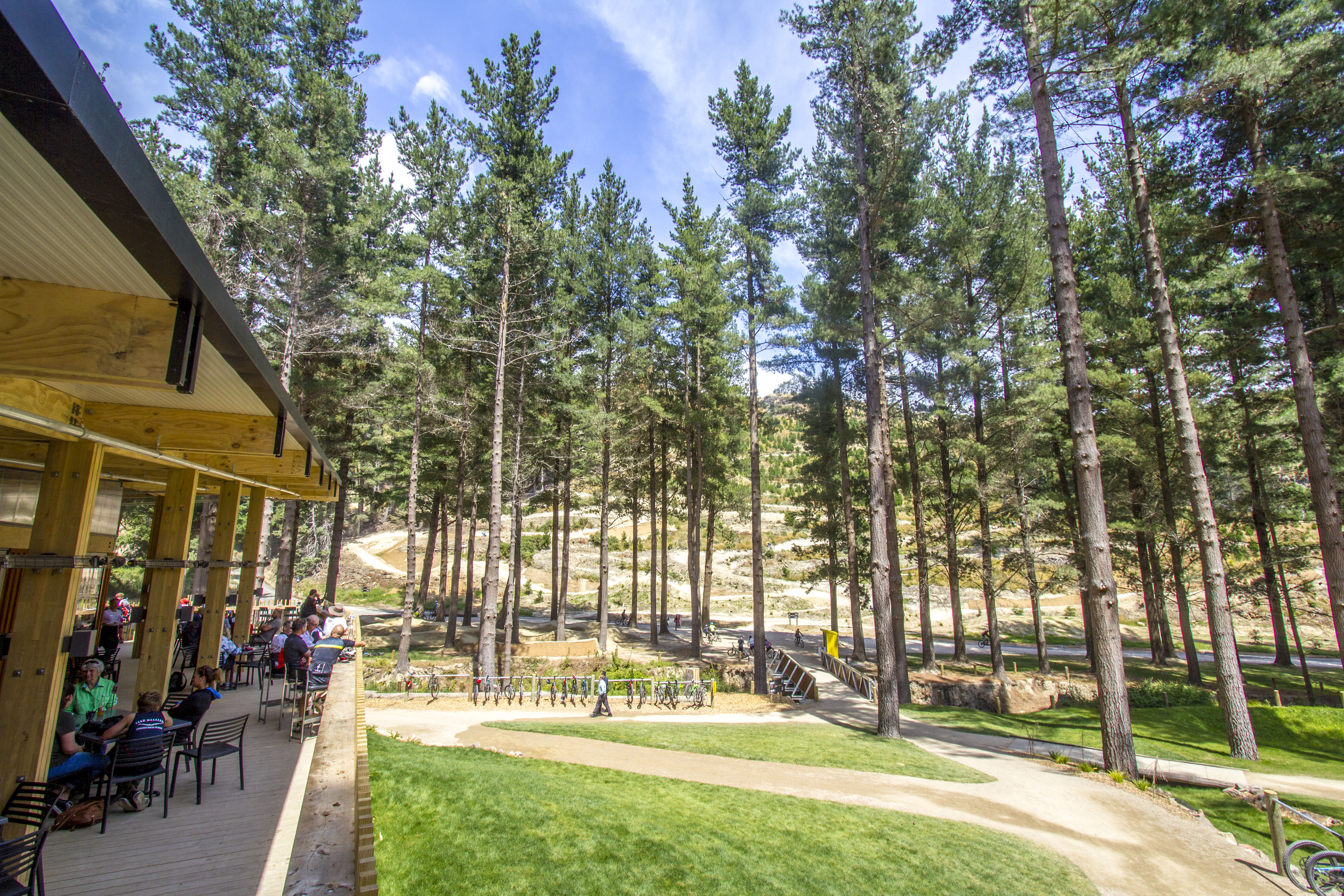
- Adventure Park Village (2017)
- Interactive map of Christchurch Adventure Park
- Type: Adventure Park
- Location: Cashmere, New Zealand, Christchurch, New Zealand
- Coordinates: 43.5987°S 172.6323°E
- Area: 358 hectares (880 acres)
- Created: December 2016
- Operator: Christchurch Adventure Park
- Open: Autumn hours: Weekdays (except Tuesdays): 11:00am – 7:00pm. Weekends: 10:00am – 7:00pm. Closed Tuesdays
- Status: Opened to the public on 21 December 2016 closed since 13 February 2017 due to fire. Reopened to the public 6 December 2017
- Website: www.christchurchadventurepark.com

Christchurch Adventure Park is an adventure park in the Port Hills of Christchurch, New Zealand. Built by the Canadian company Select Evolution, it had its opening function on 16 December 2016. The 1500 holders of special passes could ride from 17 December, while the park opened to the public on 21 December. According to the developer, the 358 hectares (880 acres) park with a 1.8 kilometres (1.1 mi) chairlift and initially 50 kilometres (31 mi) of downhill tracks is the largest facility of its kind in the Southern Hemisphere. The park closed on 13 February 2017 as a precaution due to a nearby fire and two days later, most of the park's tree cover had been destroyed in a large wildfire. The lift and ziplines have suffered significant damage, and the park's condition was much worse than the operator initially thought. The park reopened on 6 December 2017, ten months after it shut.

== Development history ==
The idea for the mountain bike park was pitched to Select Evolution, a resort consulting company based in the Canadian ski resort Whistler, in 2011. Fiona Sutton, the founder of Select Evolution and the company's president, spent almost four years in Christchurch to make the development happen. Select Evolution applied for resource consent in 2014, and 640 submissions were received by Christchurch City Council as the consenting authority, with only 35 of those in opposition. The hearings were held in November 2014, and consent was granted in January 2015. None of the opponents made use of their option to appeal the decision to the Environment Court. The Overseas Investment Office (OIO) gave approval in March 2016, after which construction work began. The office's decision was not publicly released until May 2016, though.

Parts for the park's chairlift and much of the bike rental fleet were stuck in Wellington after the port was damaged in the 2016 Kaikōura earthquake, but this did not cause a delay to the planned opening. It cost NZ$20m to build the park, and the Government made a NZ$2m grant available in May 2014. This grant was given on the condition that the park was to be open by December 2016, which forced the developer to proceed at a high speed after construction started. Christchurch City Council later also granted NZ$2m in support of the investment. Just over half of the park's funding came from overseas sources.

The land is owned by McVicar Holdings and is leased to Select Evolution on a 50-year term. There were 180 staff involved in building the park, and the park initially employs 100 staff. Initially, seven staff are on secondment from the Whistler park as they have experience with running a mountain bike park. Much of the balance of the rural land in Cashmere Valley is owned by either the McVicar family, or by Christ's College – one of the local Christchurch schools.

== Description ==
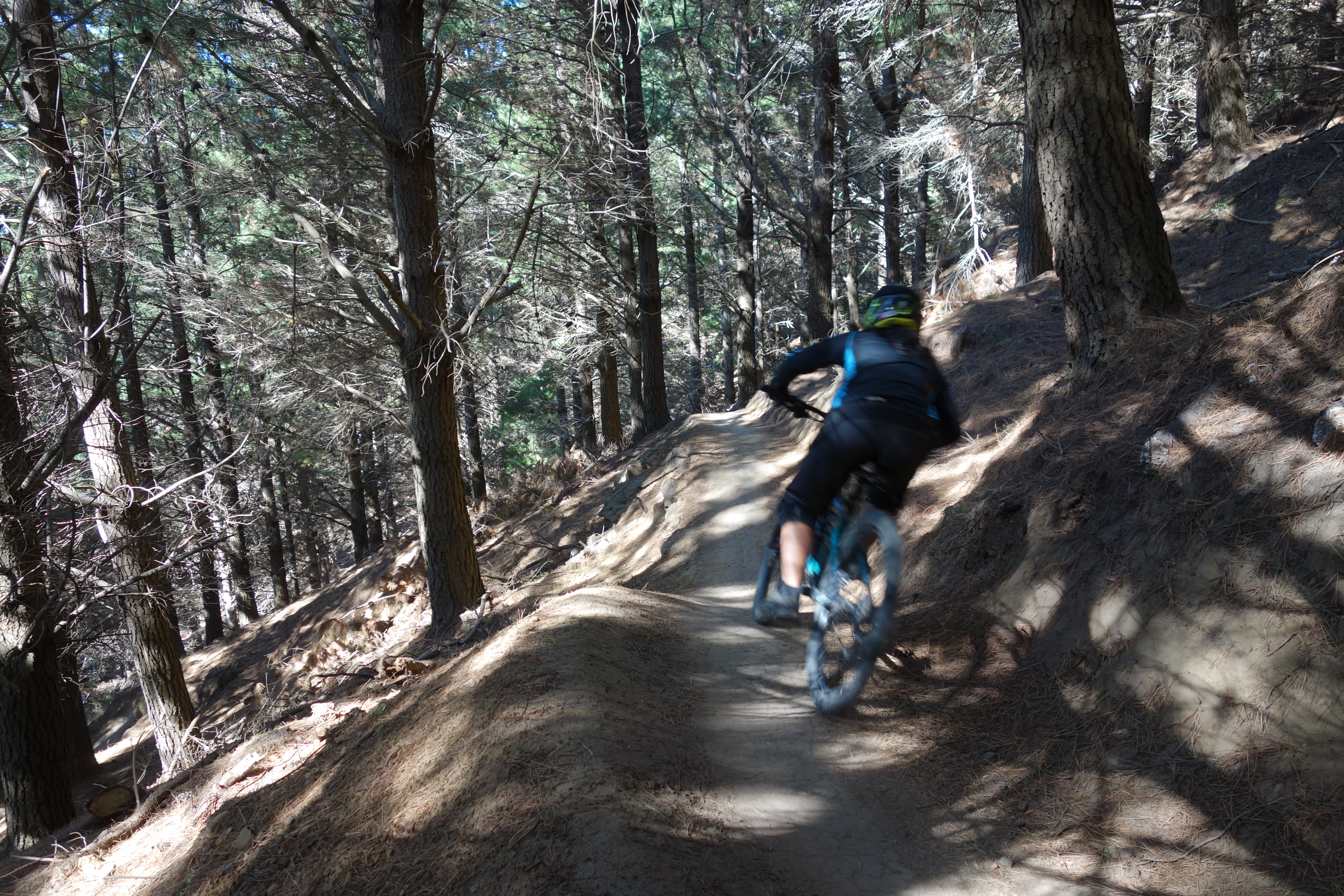
A rider on the "Yeah Yeah Gnar" track

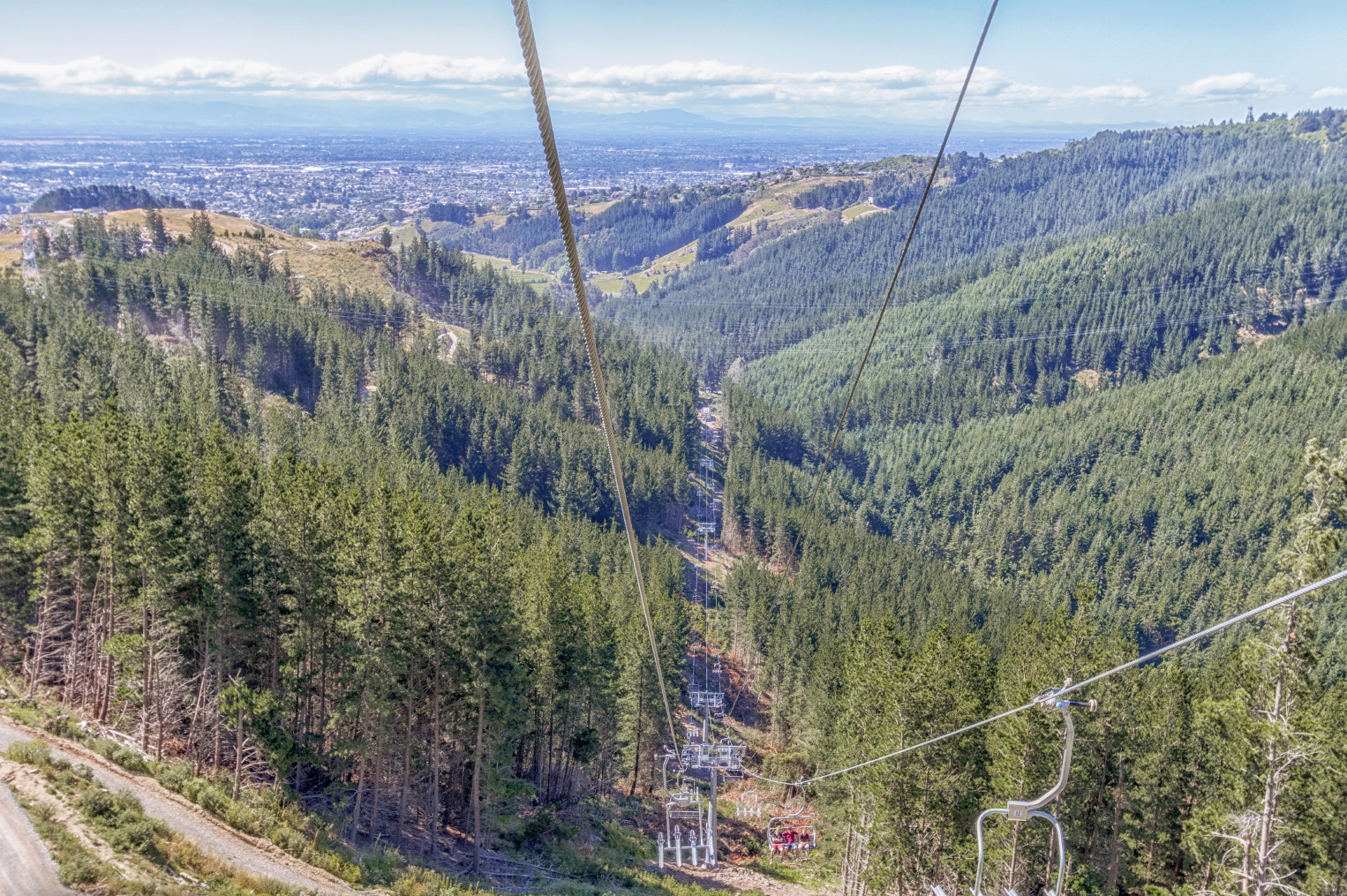
Looking down along the lift

The park is set on 358 hectares (880 acres) and is located in the suburb of Cashmere, surrounded by Dyers Pass Road, the Summit Road, and Worsleys Road. The park features a 1.8 kilometres (1.1 mi) chairlift that gains 435 metres (1,427 ft) height, and has a capacity of 1,200 riders and their bikes per hour. There are four sections of zip-line in the park, with two of them 1 kilometre (0.62 mi) in length. When the park opened, the chairlift gave access to 50 kilometres (31 mi) of downhill tracks of different levels of difficulty, and the restaurant can seat 180 people. The developer claims that the park is the largest facility of its kind in the Southern Hemisphere.

A mountain coaster was due to open by December 2017, and accommodation with 110 beds was originally scheduled for the end of 2018. Eventually, Select Evolution intends to have 220 beds as accommodation.

== Opening ==
In October 2016, 1500 passes were put up for sale, giving exclusive access to the park when it first opened and valid until September 2017. The NZ$759 passes sold out within three days. The price for annual passes, set at NZ$1199, was not released until the day of the opening party. Passes for day entry (NZ$80) and single chairlift rides (NZ$25.00) are also available. Entry to the park itself is free, including riding the tracks, and what passes give access to is the chairlift. Access to the zip-line is available via separate scheduled tours. The park was opened by the Mayor of Christchurch, Lianne Dalziel, on 21 December 2016.

The park faced wide-spread public backlash after substantially raising their prices in 2018.

The Christchurch City Council spent $4.9 million to bail out the Christchurch Adventure Park after it could no longer continue to meet debt repayments and day-to-day operating costs in May 2019.

Four new intermediate bike tracks below Dyers Pass Road were opened in September 2019.

== Fire closures ==
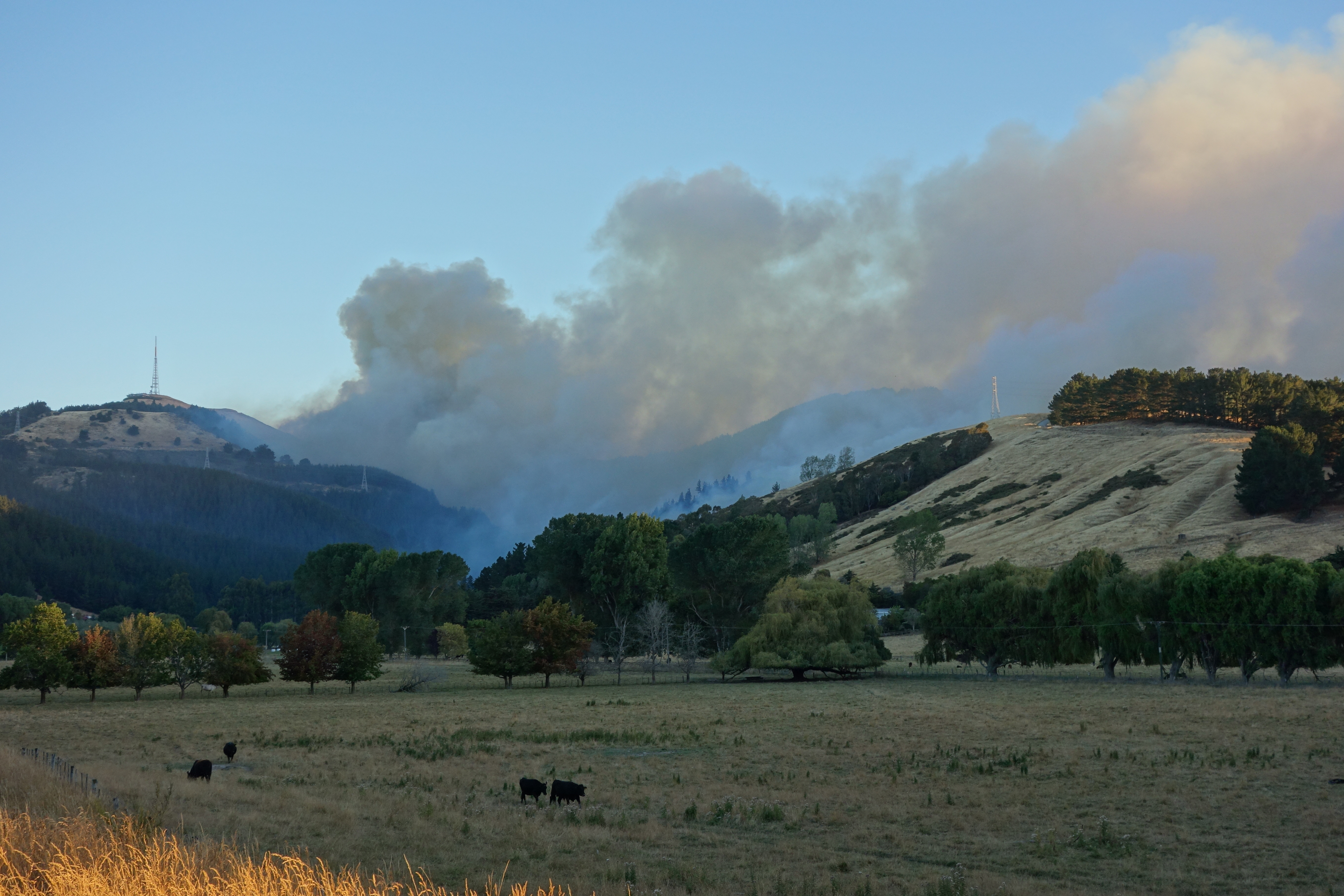
2017 Port Hills fires on 15 February (Wed) – looking up Cashmere Valley with the Christchurch Adventure Park burning

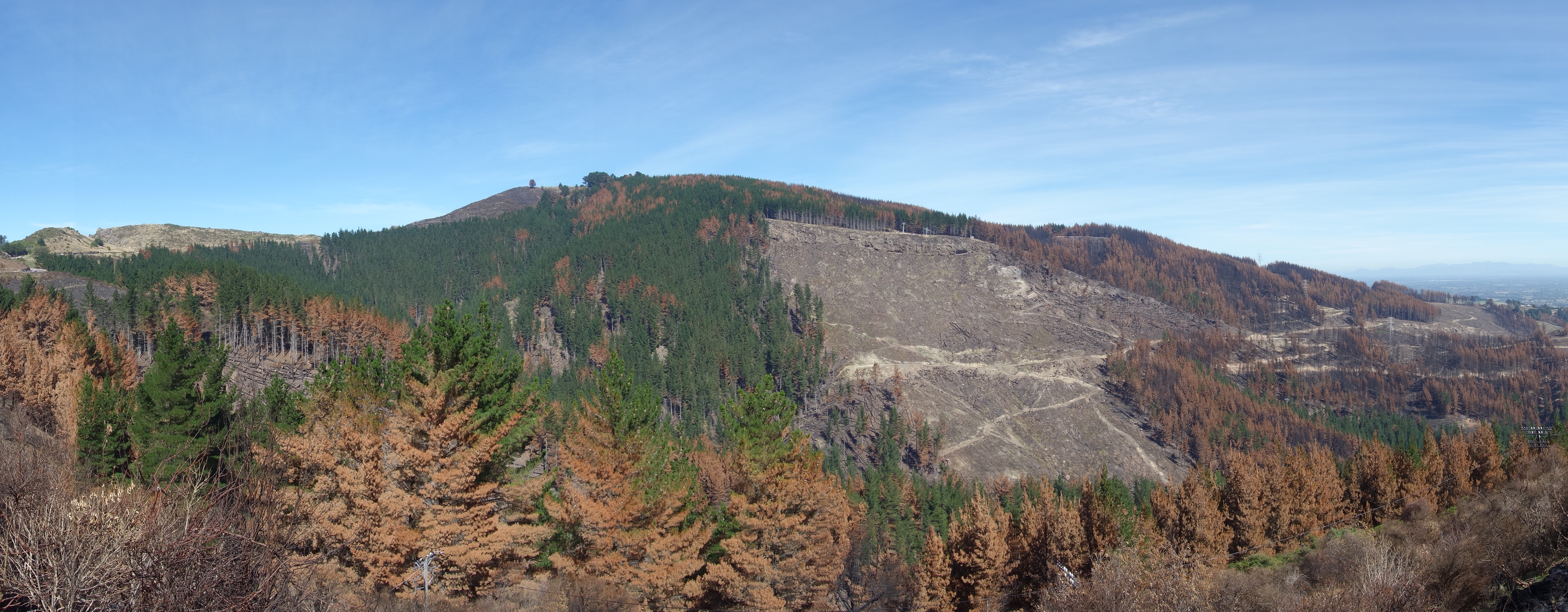
Fire damage as seen from Dyers Pass Road

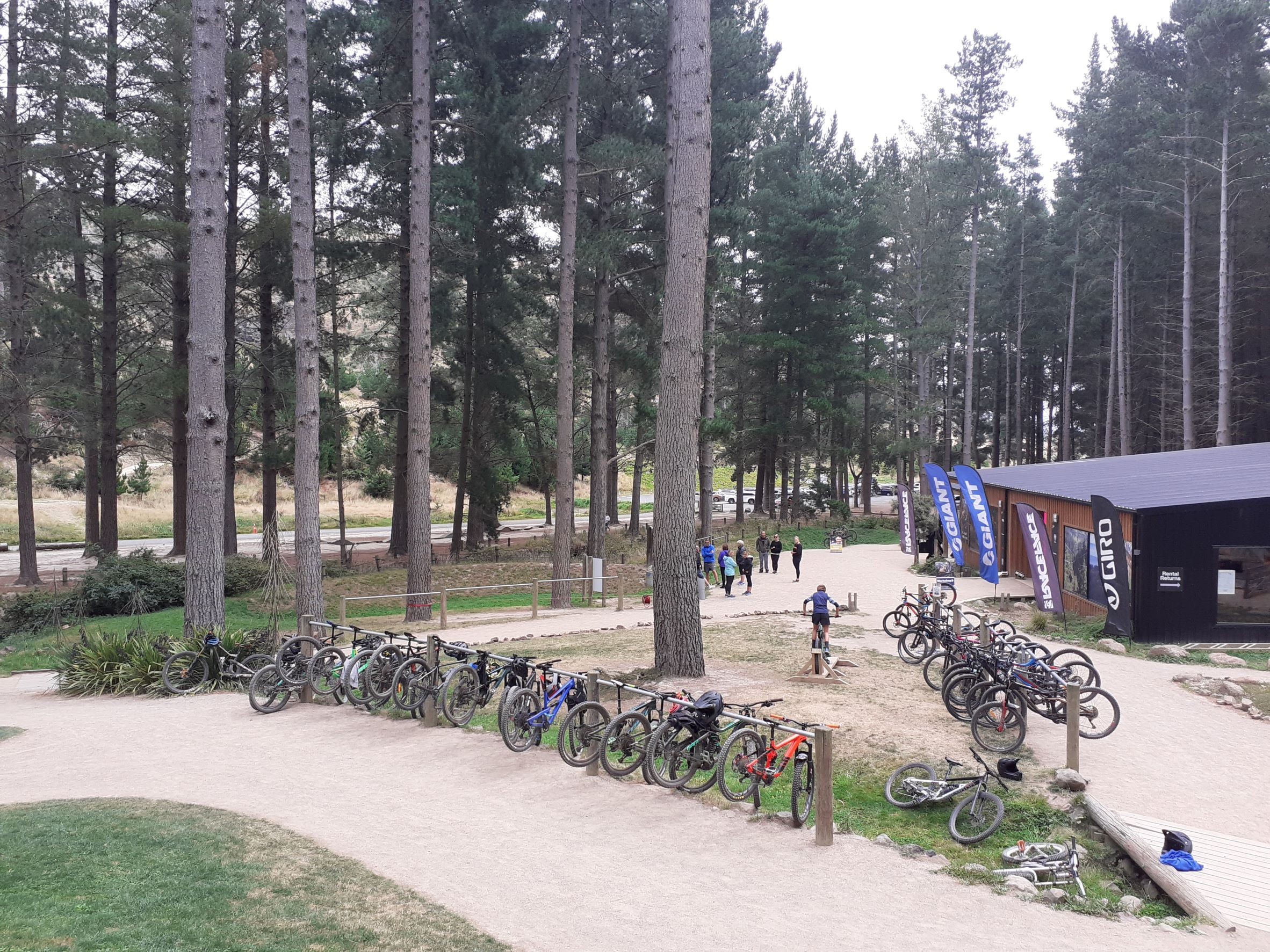
Base buildings, Christchurch Adventure Park (2021)

A Port Hills fire that started on Monday, 13 February 2017 on nearby Marleys Hill had by the following morning crossed the boundary of the Christchurch Adventure Park. It was one of two fires on the Port Hills, which were being fought by many helicopters with monsoon buckets and fixed wing planes. One of those helicopters crashed on 14 February at Sugarloaf, killing its pilot. During Wednesday, the fire had burned down the hill within the Christchurch Adventure Park, and four to six fire service crews moved in at 2100h to try and save the park's village and base station for the chairlift. On Thursday morning, information was given that the buildings and the lift had survived the fire. Vicki Anderson, a journalist with the Christchurch newspaper, The Press, put the situation into context with regards to the city's recovery after the 2011 Christchurch earthquake:

Any damage to the Adventure Park and the beautiful trees that surround it is particularly galling. It's a fun-filled giant symbol that Christchurch was moving forward – that, finally, something was happening in the rebuild. To be uncertain of its future so soon after celebrating its opening is disheartening.

— Vicki Anderson,

Seven years later on 14 February 2024, another wildfire was started near the park. The park was closed for safety reasons.

== Reopening ==
The Rural Fire Authority handed the park back to the operator on 10 March 2017. The park operator clarified that the remedial work was not going to be a quick process, as there is extensive damage to trees, their root system, and damage to the chairlift and zip-lines. Before a reopening date could be set, the operator would have to work with the land owner and their insurance company. Due to risk of rock and tree fall on much of the sloped land, the operator has not been able to assess the damage fully, but announced that "it's not going to be a quick fix". Much of the damage is worse than initially thought, and the lift's 36-tonne haul rope will have to be replaced. Many of the trees will have to be felled, and fire breaks cut by the firefighters have also caused much damage. The operator has laid off 30 staff, many of whom were on fixed-term contracts.

The park was closed for ten months. Extensive work was required to replace the haul rope on the chairlift and three of the zip lines. The park was reopened in December 2017 with only three mountain bike trails open.

The park faced wide-spread public backlash after substantially raising their prices in 2018.

The Christchurch City Council spent $4.9 million to bail out the Christchurch Adventure Park after it could no longer continue to meet debt repayments and day-to-day operating costs in May 2019.

Four new intermediate bike tracks below Dyers Pass Road were opened in September 2019. The park had to again close in March 2020 due to the Covid-19 lockdown and reopened halfway through May 2020. The park then reviewed its pricing with reductions in annual passes and introduced no charges for under ten year olds.

By December 2020, the park had built 33 different mountain bike trails. 100,000 riders visited the park in 2020. In February 2021, the park was described as one of the top 10 new facilities built since the February 2011 Christchurch earthquake.

== Lawsuit ==
Following the Port Hills fires video evidence emerged of the Christchurch Adventure Park chair lift appearing to start spot fires below the chair lift line. The Adventure Park had kept the chair lift running throughout the fires and the chairs appeared to catch fire and subsequently start new fires as the chairs returned to the bottom of the Park. Following the release of the Fire Service Operational Review which noted the chair lift did spread the fire into residential properties, insurer IAG filed a lawsuit against the Adventure Park to recover the costs of damages caused to policy holders due to the chair lift fires. In April 2021, the Christchurch Adventure Park was found negligent and ordered by the high court to pay $12 million to the homeowners whose properties were destroyed and damaged in the Port Hills fires in 2017. In May 2021, this judgement was appealed by the insurers of the Christchurch Adventure Park.
