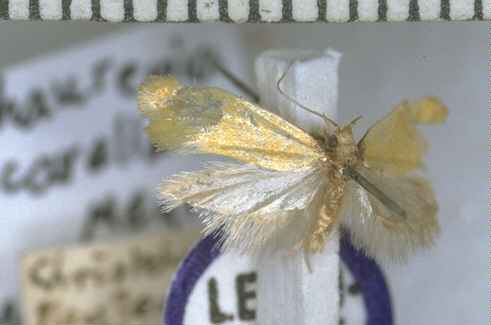
- Male lectotype

Scientific classification
- Kingdom: Animalia
- Phylum: Arthropoda
- Class: Insecta
- Order: Lepidoptera
- Family: Oecophoridae
- Genus: Tingena
- Species: T. macarella

Binomial name
- Tingena macarella (Meyrick, 1883)

Synonyms
- Oecophora macarella Meyrick, 1883; Borkhausenia macarella (Meyrick, 1883)

= Tingena macarella =

Species of moth, endemic to New Zealand

Tingena macarella is a species of moth in the family Oecophoridae. It is endemic to New Zealand and is found on both the North and South Islands. Adults of this species are on the wing from November until February. This species is attracted to light and the larvae are litter feeders.

== Taxonomy ==
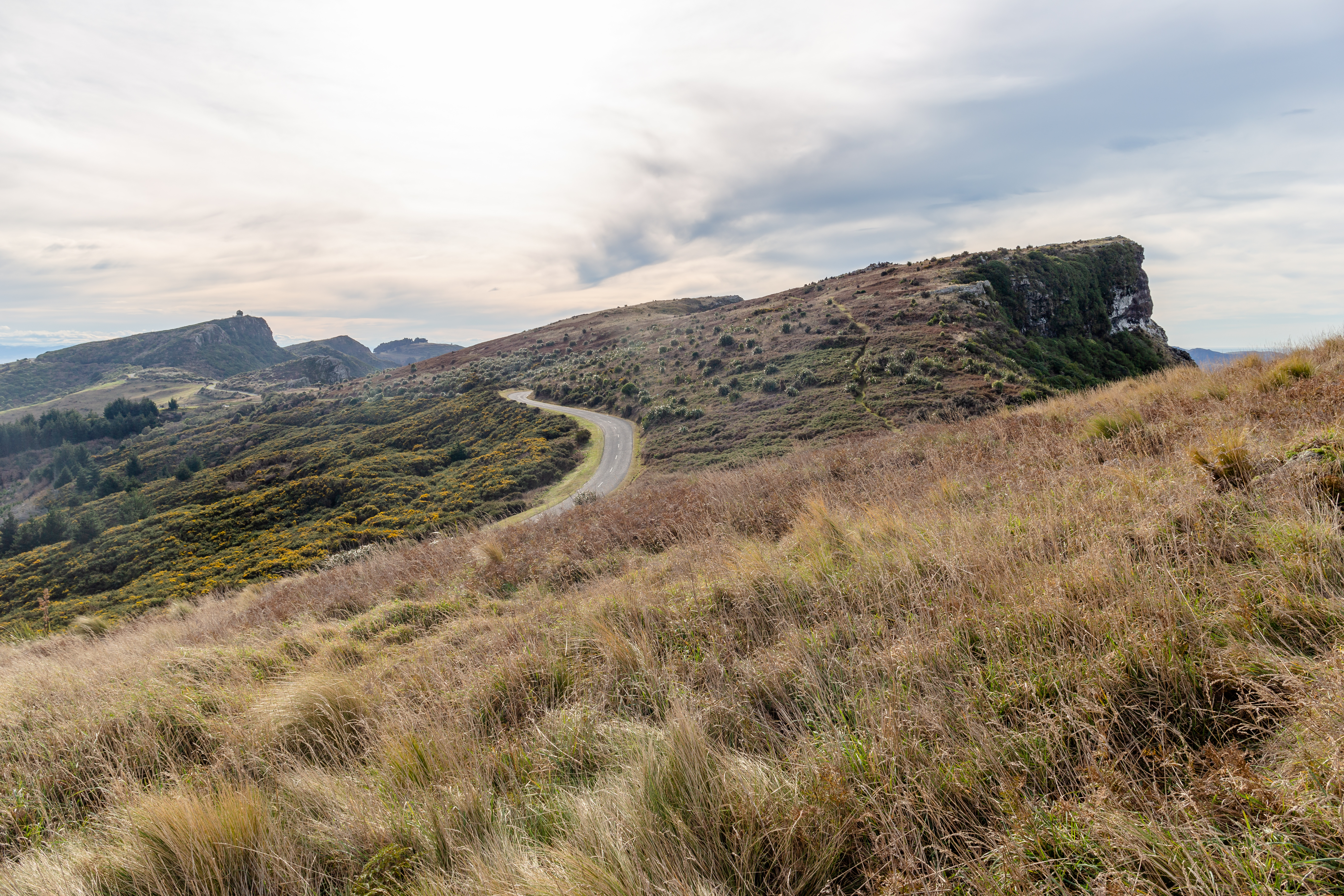
Port Hills, type locality of T. macarella.

This species was first described by Edward Meyrick in 1883 using specimens collected in Christchurch in January and named Oecophora macarella. Meyrick went on to give a more detailed description in 1884. In 1915 Meyrick placed this species within the Borkhausenia genus. In 1926 Alfred Philpott was unable to study the genitalia of the male of this species as no species were held in New Zealand collections. George Hudson discussed this species under the name B. macarella in his 1928 publication The butterflies and moths of New Zealand. In 1988 J. S. Dugdale placed this species in the genus Tingena. The male lectotype, collected in the Port Hills, is held at the Natural History Museum, London.

== Description ==
Meyrick first described this species as follows:

Fore wings pale yellow, base of costa blackish, sometimes a mark on fold and bar from anal angle obscurely dark fuscous; hind wings whitish-grey; thorax dark fuscous, posterior margin yellowish.

Meyrick went on to do a more detailed description as follows:

Male, female. — 12 1/2-14 mm. Head pale yellow. Palpi whitish-yellow, basal half of both joints externally irrorated with dark fuscous. Antennae ochreous-whitish, basal joint dark fuscous except at apex. Thorax dark fuscous, with small lateral and posterior pale yellowish spots. Abdomen grey-whitish. Anterior legs dark fuscous; middle legs ochreous-whitish irrorated with dark fuscous, except at apex of joints; posterior legs ochreous-whitisb. Forewings moderate, costa moderately arched, apex blunt-pointed, hindmargin very obliquely rounded; pale yellow, somewhat suffused with deeper yellow; costa dark fuscous towards base; sometimes a few dark fuscous scales on fold at 1/3, and on a bar from disc to anal angle : cilia pale yellow, with several rows of grey points, and a darker grey shade before tips. Hindwings whitish-grey; cilia grey-whitish.

Meyrick suggested that this species could be distinguished by its "pale yellow colouring, less defined basal mark on costa and the almost wholly dark fuscous thorax".

== Distribution ==
This species is endemic to New Zealand and has been observed on both the North and South Islands including in Wellington, Kapiti Island and Christchurch.

== Behaviour ==
The adults of this species are on the wing from November to February. T. macarella are attracted to light.

== Hosts ==
The larvae of this species are litter feeders including on the litter of Festuca.
