= Victoria Park, Christchurch =

New Zealand protected area on the Christchurch Port Hills

Coordinates: 43°35′23″S 172°38′37″E

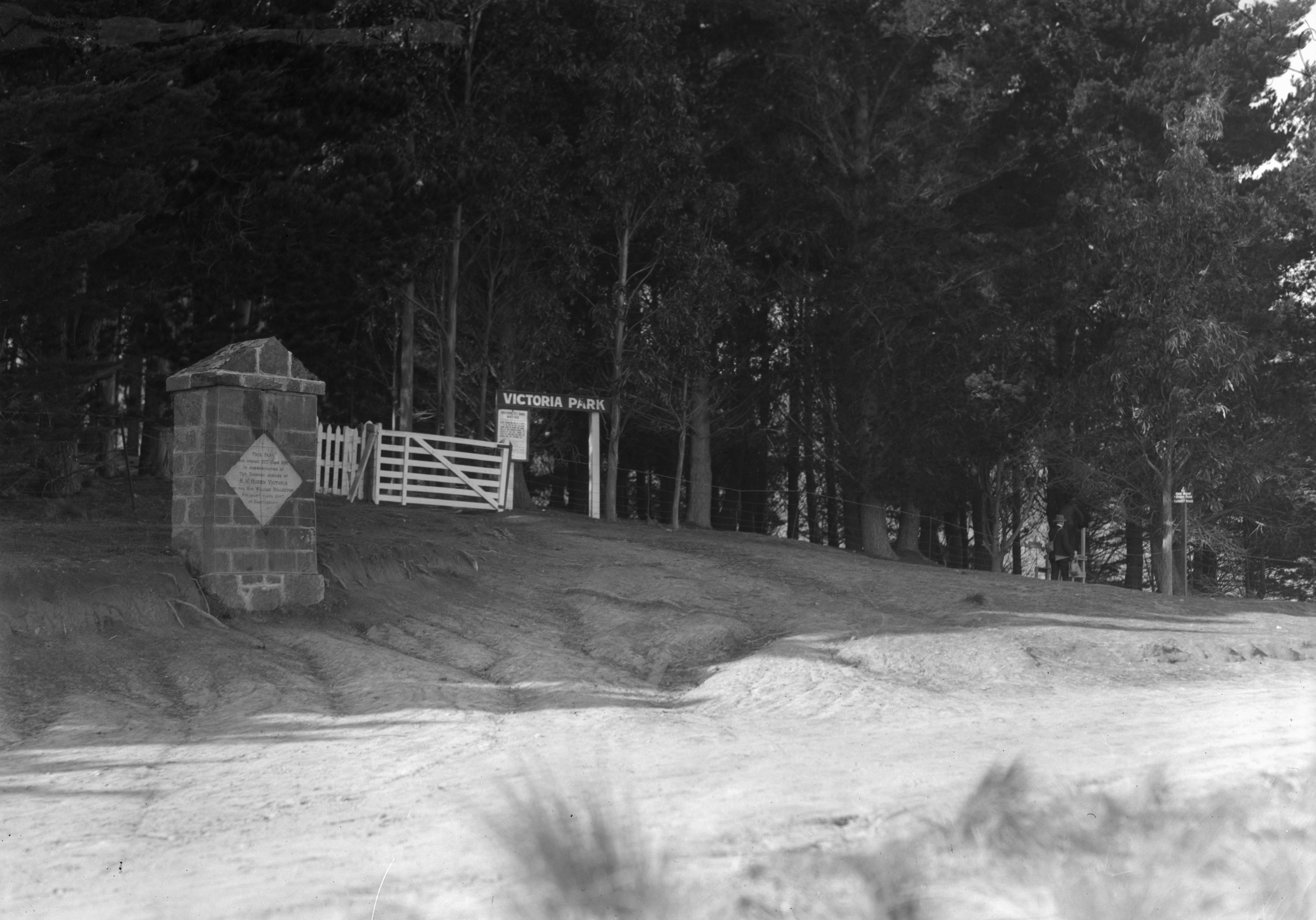
Gates of Victoria Park. The plaque reads: "This park was opened 22 June 1897 in commemoration of the Diamond Jubilee of H M Queen Victoria by the Hon William Rolleston, for many years Supt of Canterbury"

Victoria Park is a large recreational area on the Port Hills above Christchurch, New Zealand, established in 1883.

== Description ==
The park was formally opened by William Rolleston on 22 June 1897 for the Diamond Jubilee of Queen Victoria.

The park has an information centre, and features open parkland, planted gardens and pine forest, with a variety of walking tracks and a permanent orienteering course. Mountain biking tracks extend into the adjacent Bowenvale Reserve, and include several challenging downhill routes, including the Nationals Down Hill Track.

The park was the site of the 1954 Parker–Hulme murder that has inspired plays, novels, non-fiction books, and most notably, the Oscar-nominated film Heavenly Creatures.
