= Ōmawete / Coopers Knob =

Hill peak in the Port Hills above Christchurch, New Zealand

Coopers Knob
- Ōmawete
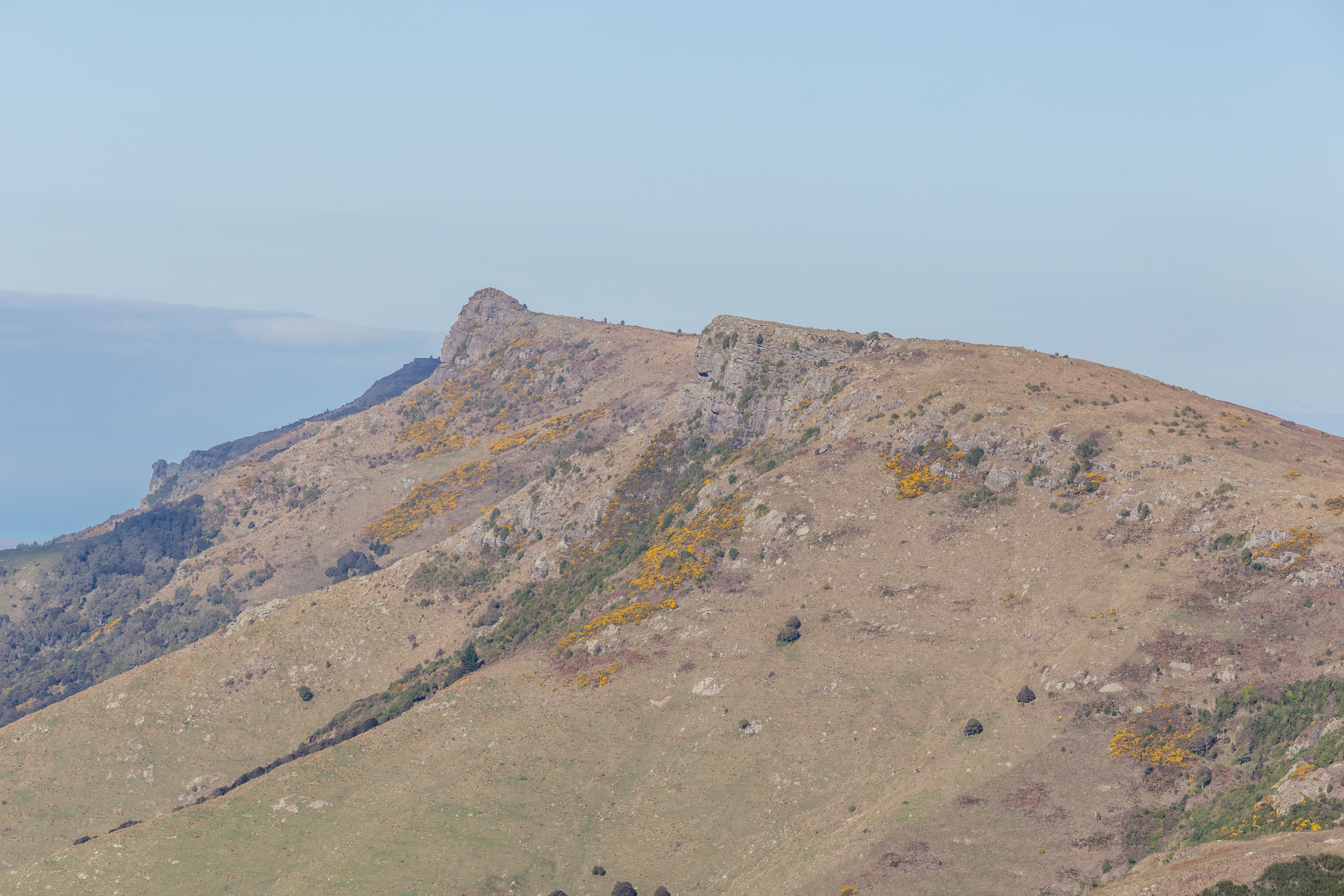
- Coopers Knob in 2020

Highest point
- Elevation: 573 m (1,880 ft)
- Coordinates: 43°39′40″S 172°37′30″E

Geography
- Location within Banks Peninsula
- Location: Christchurch
- Parent range: Port Hills

Geology
- Mountain type: Basalt volcanic rock

Ōmawete / Coopers Knob is a hill in the Port Hills approximately 13.5 kilometres (8.4 mi) south of Christchurch, New Zealand. It is the highest point on the Port Hills, at 573 metres (1,880 ft).

Coopers Knob sits between Tai Tapu to the west and Governors Bay to the east. Below the summit is the 39 acres (16 ha) Cooper's Knob Reserve, created in 1948 by the Christchurch City Council.

== Name ==
The Māori name, Ōmawete, comes from a story involving Te Rangiwhakaputa. A hunting party led by Ngāti Mamoe chief, Mawete, was ambushed by Ngāi Tahu hunters in the forest just below the peak, with Mawete and most of his followers killed.

The English name comes from Daniel Cooper, an early Australian convict and merchant whose ships visited the area before it was settled.
