= 2024 Port Hills fire =

Wildfire in New Zealand

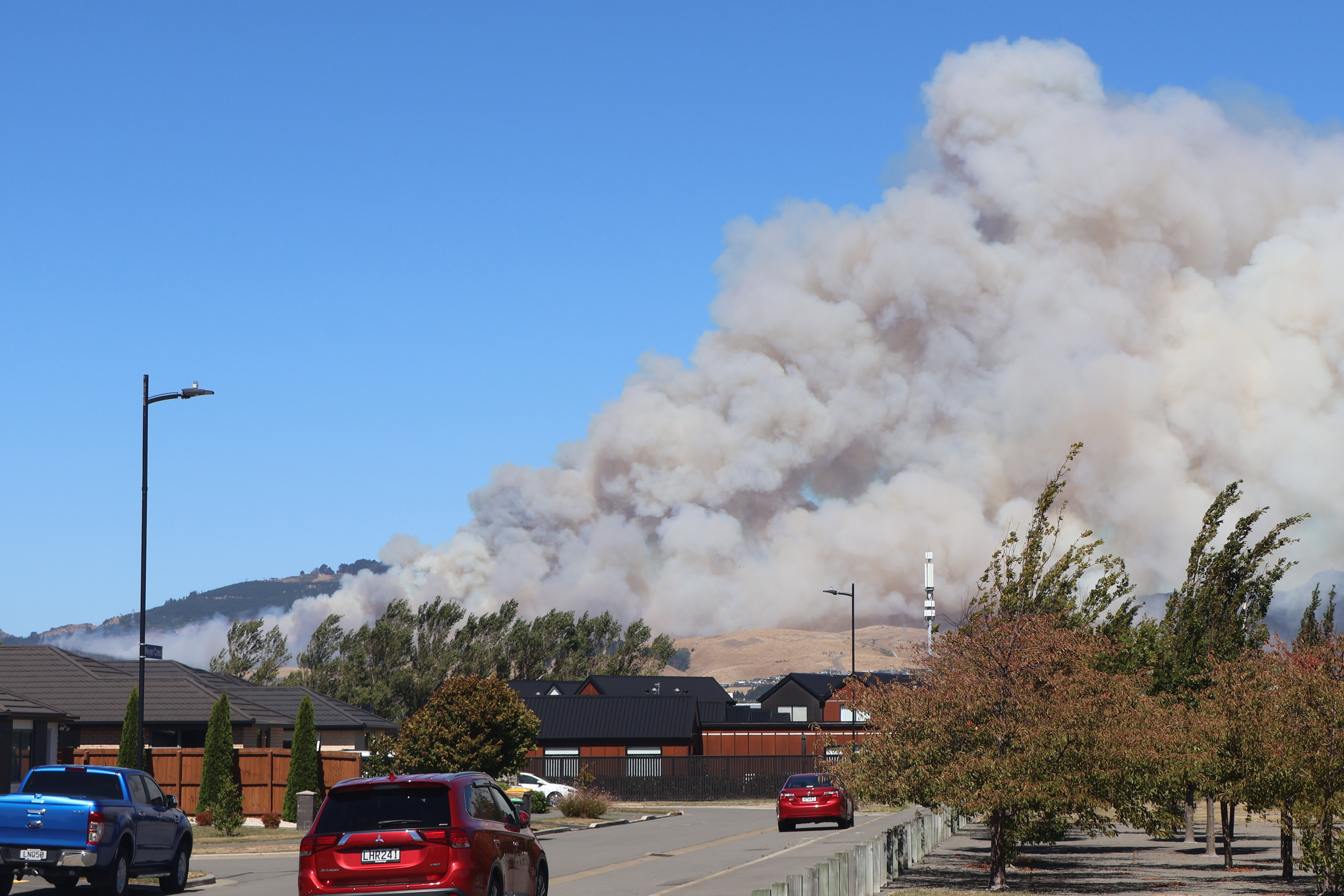
- The fire on the afternoon of Wednesday 14 February
- Date: 14 February 2024 – 6 March 2024
- Location: Port Hills, Christchurch, New Zealand

Statistics
- Burned area: 700 hectares (1,700 acres)

Impacts
- Structures lost: 1 home

The 2024 Port Hills fire was a wildfire in Christchurch, New Zealand. The fire started at around 2:15 pm NZDT on 14 February 2024 on Worsleys Road. It is close to the location of one of the fires that started on 13 February 2017 which developed into the 2017 Port Hills fires.

At the height of firefighting efforts on 16 February, the fire had spread over 650 hectares and was fought by over 100 firefighters, 15 helicopters, two fixed-wing planes, and 28 fire engines. 110 properties were evacuated in total.

Management of the fire ground continued for around 3 weeks, though it was largely put out within a few days. After an investigation, Fire and Emergency New Zealand (FENZ) and the New Zealand Police determined that the cause of the fire was unknown.

== Events ==
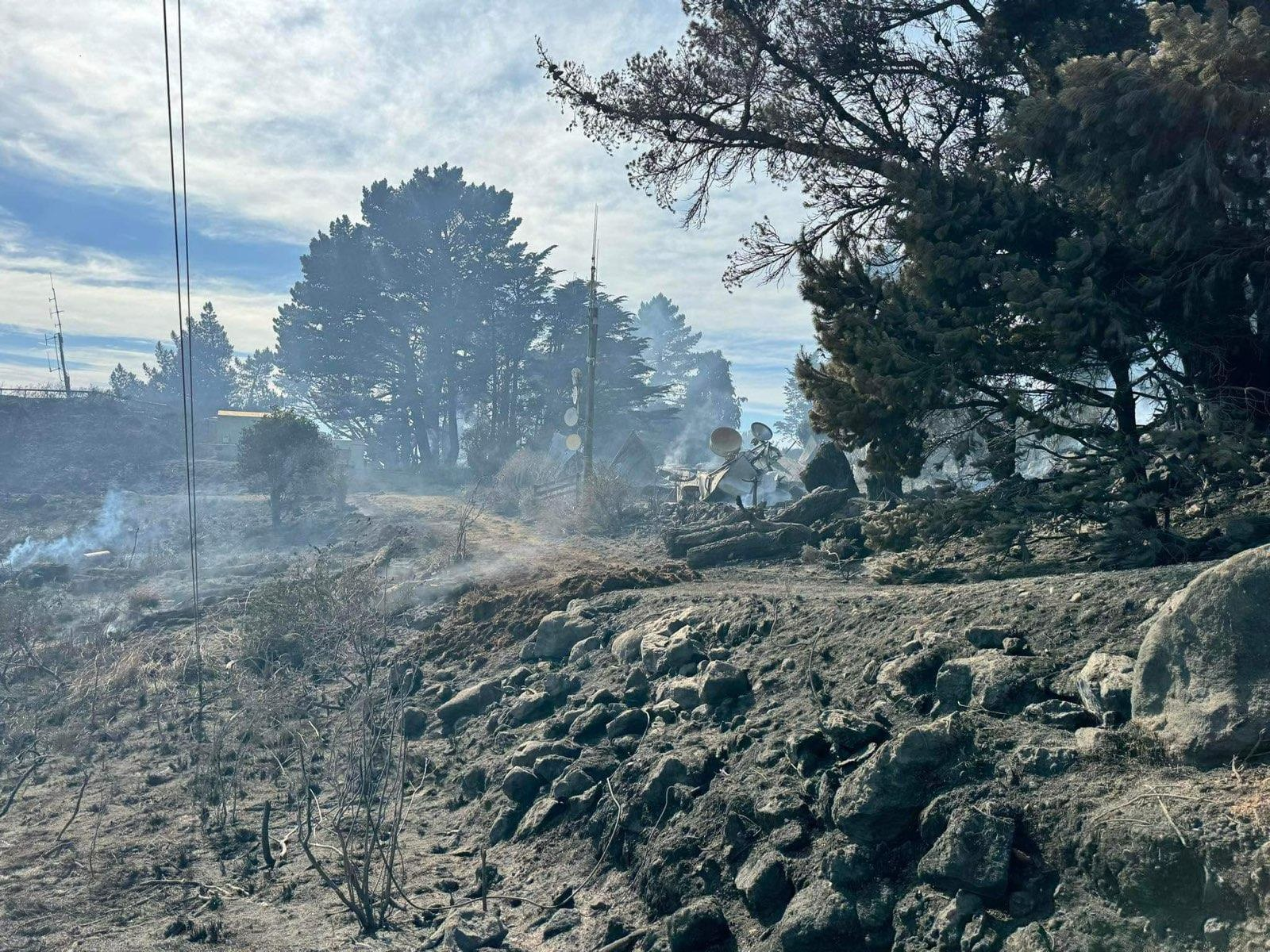
Image of a damaged radio repeater site at the top of Marleys Hill on 15 February 2024

Fire and Emergency New Zealand said that dry weather had led to "tinder conditions". Dozens of properties were evacuated, including the nearby Princess Margaret Hospital. On 14 February a state of emergency was declared in Christchurch and Selwyn. Starting at 2:45 pm, for 25 minutes, 39,000 properties were left without power. Transpower determined that the cause was soot causing arcing and an outage at the Bromley substation. As of 15 February, the fire was being fought by 28 fire appliances, 14 helicopters and two retardant-dropping aircraft, which consisted of 80 Fire and Emergency crews.

On the night of 14 February, 80 homes were evacuated, and firefighters created a fire break between Worsleys Spur and Dyers Pass Road. On the night of 17 February and the morning after, a civilian drone caused several helicopters to be grounded.

== Investigation and origin ==
The cause of the fire is officially undetermined. The fire began on private property sometime between 1:45 pm and 2:08 pm. The first call to emergency services was made at 2:13 pm. While the property owner had been in the area before the fire, no ignition source could be identified. Due to the high relative humidity, it is possible the fire started earlier as a smouldering fire, and only ignited into flame later.

Police and FENZ asked for photographs of the fire between 1:45 pm and 2:45 pm to trace the origin, half an hour before and after the fire began. The footage received from the public assisted in determining the time the fire started. The ignition point of the fire has been identified as within metres of a public walking track in a pine plantation on Worsleys Spur.

Ultimately, FENZ determined there was no evidence that the fire was intentionally lit, though Christchurch Adventure Park managing director John McVicar said he felt it was likely the result of arson.

== Aftermath ==
In the aftermath of the fire, questions were raised about whether it was safe to replant the area with highly flammable pine trees. Residents expressed frustration that the area was replanted with pine trees after the 2017 fire. Christchurch City Council Mayor Phil Mauger and Selwyn District Council Mayor Sam Broughton wrote to the government forestry minister Todd McClay requesting changes to forestry rules that made it difficult for the councils to manage wildfire hazards, but the government declined to act on the request.

In an operational review released in February 2025, FENZ found that their "aggressive" approach to the fire had resulted in a quicker resolution than the previous 2017 fire. They revealed they had spent NZ$3,000,000 extinguishing it, less than the NZ$7,000,000 spent on the 2017 fire. Additional early-warning detector systems designed by Attentis were installed in the Port Hills. The system did not provide early warning of the fire, but was useful in informing the FENZ response.

During the recovery the Christchurch City Council spent NZ$750,000 on protecting downstream waterways from sediment and ash runoff.
