= Sugarloaf (New Zealand) =

Mountain in Canterbury region, New Zealand

Sugarloaf communications tower
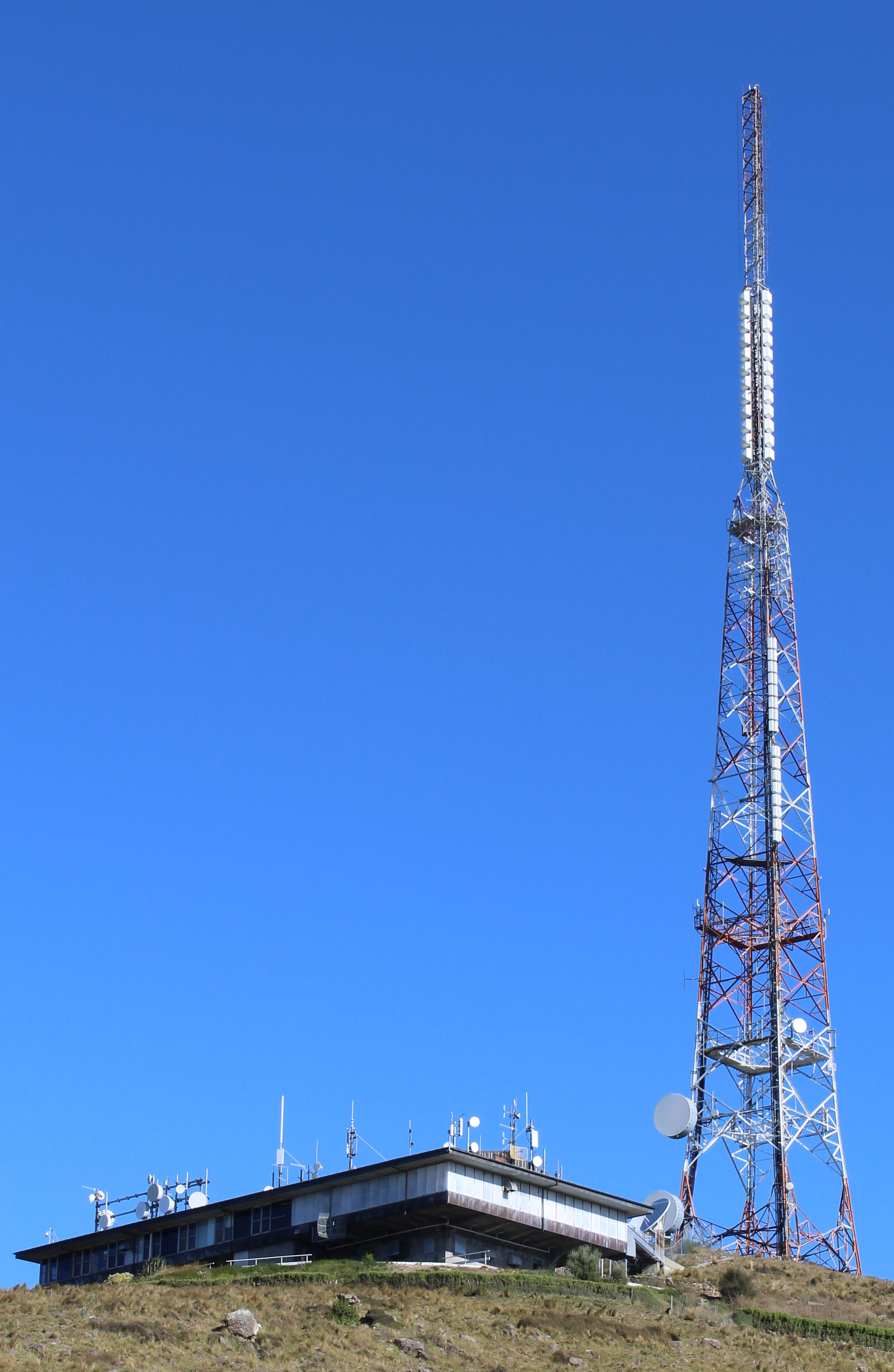
- Sugarloaf communications tower viewed from the car park off Summit Road

Highest point
- Elevation: 493.78 m (1,620.0 ft)
- Coordinates: 43°36′12″S 172°38′58″E

Naming
- Native name: Te Heru o Kahukura (Māori)

Geography
- Location within Christchurch, New Zealand
- Location: Christchurch, New Zealand

Geology
- Mountain type: Basalt volcanic rock

Sugarloaf (Māori: Te Heru o Kahukura) is a hill in the Port Hills, 8 km (5.0 mi) south of central Christchurch in New Zealand. The hill is home to the main television and FM radio transmitter for Christchurch and the wider Canterbury region.

== Etymology ==
Te Heru o Kahukura, the Māori name for Sugarloaf, translates as "the headcomb of Kahukura".

== Geography ==
The tower is situated at an elevation of 493.78 m on the top of the Port Hills, near Dyers Pass. This area is officially known as Sugarloaf Scenic Reserve. This reserve land occasionally doubles as a sheep farm and includes a car park lookout point for general public use.

== Communications tower ==
In 1962, the New Zealand Broadcasting Corporation leased a 4.9-hectare section of the reserve from the Crown at the summit of Sugarloaf Hill to install and operate a television communications tower and control building. The control building, housing a 100 kW transmitter, and the 121-metre (397 ft) transmitter tower were completed in 1965. Television channel CHTV3 (now part of TVNZ 1) started transmitting from the tower at 9:00 am on 28 August 1965, broadcasting a test card until regular programming commenced at 2:00 pm. Prior to the switch, CHTV3 had transmitted from a 10 kW transmitter atop the Gloucester Street studios in central Christchurch.

In 1975, new aerials were installed on the tower for TV2 (now TVNZ 2). However, a fault in one of the aerials caused a loss of power in part of the transmission pattern, resulting in poor reception across northwestern Christchurch, particularly in Fendalton, while more distant areas such as Timaru received the channel with a clear picture. As a result, the channel's launch in Christchurch on 30 June 1975 was delayed until 6:00 pm to allow additional time for repairs.

FM radio broadcasting from the tower began on 31 May 1986, with 3ZM transmitting on 91.3 MHz.

The "Big Snow" of 27–28 August 1992 caused the Sugarloaf transmitting station to lose mains power after a power pole fell during the storm. Snowdrifts up to 6 metres (20 ft) deep blocked road access, making it difficult to refuel the station's backup diesel generator. At approximately 3:00 am on 29 August, the generator ran out of fuel, interrupting television and FM radio transmissions to Christchurch for approximately 19 hours. Television transmissions began to be restored at 9:20 pm after technicians reached the station with diesel fuel, following a six-hour journey in an Army truck behind a bulldozer clearing the access road.

With a height of 121 m, the lattice steel structured tower is founded on a 5-metre deep concrete pad underlain by basalt volcanic rock. It is situated approximately 50 m behind the main transmission building, which combined with the tower is visible from most parts of Christchurch city.

=== Transmission house ===
The tower is located 50 m behind a two storey transmission building which houses multiple transmission gear. The main equipment room is fully air conditioned and known to local technicians as the great transmitter hall. The building is approximately 40 m in width and 20 m in depth. On the roof of this building there are several satellites, small antennae and multiple parabolic dishes for private WiFi networks. There are two main shielded cable runs that go between the transmission house and back to the tower. This building has been unmanned for several years. The tower building was designed by Arthur Spiers, who won a design competition for the Ministry of Works.

=== Technical aspects ===
The main antennas transmit TV and VHF FM signals in the 88 MHz to 610 MHz range. The composite total power fed to all of the transmitting antennas is approximately 64 kW while the antenna gain values range from 7.8 to 16.5 dBd. Multiple services operate off the tower including television, radio, emergency response, aviation, cellular and other data signals.

The tower covers much of Christchurch and central Canterbury, for example the DVB-T signal reaches as far as Waipara in the north, the foothills of the Southern Alps in the west, and the Rangitata River in the south. However, not all of the central Canterbury region is covered by this tower. The nearby township of Akaroa (and most of the settlements near Akaroa) have limited to non-existent TV reception and variable radio reception.Likewise, the Christchurch suburbs of Redcliffs and Sumner have limited coverage from Sugarloaf, with radio (and formerly analogue television) provided through a low-power repeater in the suburb of Southshore.

=== Transmission frequencies ===
This table contains television frequencies currently operating at Sugarloaf, and the FM broadcast frequencies are contained in this linked list of stations article:

TV Channel	Transmit Channel	Transmit Frequency	Band	ERP (kW)
Kordia digital	28	530 MHz	UHF	50, horizontal
Sky digital	30	546 MHz	UHF	50, horizontal
Discovery NZ digital	32	562 MHz	UHF	50, horizontal
TVNZ digital	34	578 MHz	UHF	50, horizontal
Kordia digital	36	594 MHz	UHF	50, horizontal
Māori Television digital	38	610 MHz	UHF	50, horizontal

==== Former analogue television frequencies ====
The following frequencies were used until 28 April 2013, when Sugarloaf switched off analogue broadcasts.

TV Channel	Transmit Channel	Transmit Frequency	Band	Power (kW)
TV One	3	62.2396 MHz	VHF	100
TV3	6	189.2604 MHz	VHF	320
TV2	8	203.25 MHz	VHF	320
Four	11	224.239575 MHz	VHF	200
CTV	44	655.25 MHz	UHF	25
Māori Television	46	671.2604 MHz	UHF	320
Prime	62	799.25 MHz	UHF	320

=== Case studies ===
An RF emissions report conducted on 9 February 1998 by the National Radiation Laboratory found that maximum exposure levels of 8 μW/cm2 were detected in the car park area, immediately below the Sugar Loaf antenna. This is 4% of the maximum of 200 μW/cm2 specified for public exposure levels in NZS 6609.1:1990. As the distance from the antenna increased, the exposure levels decreased markedly and, in general, were below 2 μW/cm2. The report concluded that the site is operating in accordance with NZS 6609.1:1990.

== Climate ==
Climate data for Sugarloaf (1991–2010)
Month	Jan	Feb	Mar	Apr	May	Jun	Jul	Aug	Sep	Oct	Nov	Dec	Year
Mean daily maximum °C (°F)	19.5 (67.1)	19.1 (66.4)	17.4 (63.3)	14.8 (58.6)	12.3 (54.1)	9.6 (49.3)	8.8 (47.8)	9.9 (49.8)	12.1 (53.8)	13.9 (57.0)	15.8 (60.4)	17.6 (63.7)	14.2 (57.6)
Daily mean °C (°F)	14.9 (58.8)	14.9 (58.8)	13.4 (56.1)	11.4 (52.5)	9.2 (48.6)	6.8 (44.2)	6.2 (43.2)	6.9 (44.4)	8.5 (47.3)	9.9 (49.8)	11.4 (52.5)	13.4 (56.1)	10.6 (51.0)
Mean daily minimum °C (°F)	10.3 (50.5)	10.6 (51.1)	9.4 (48.9)	7.9 (46.2)	6.2 (43.2)	3.9 (39.0)	3.5 (38.3)	3.9 (39.0)	4.8 (40.6)	5.8 (42.4)	7.0 (44.6)	9.1 (48.4)	6.9 (44.4)
Source: NIWA

== Gallery ==
Sugarloaf Mountain communications tower
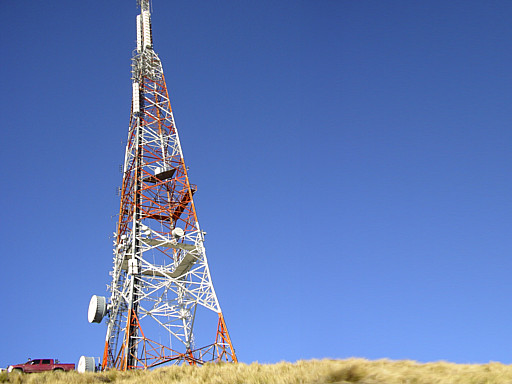
The Sugarloaf Communications tower stands 121 m high.

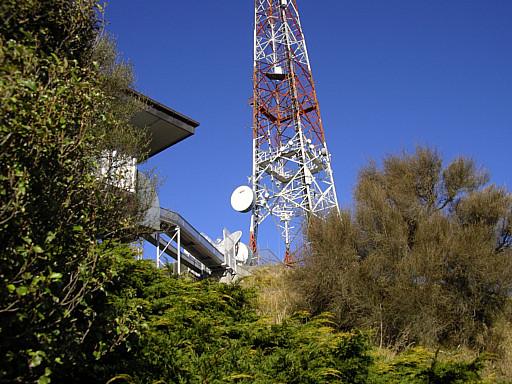
Sugarloaf Communications Tower showing cable runs from back of building to base of tower.

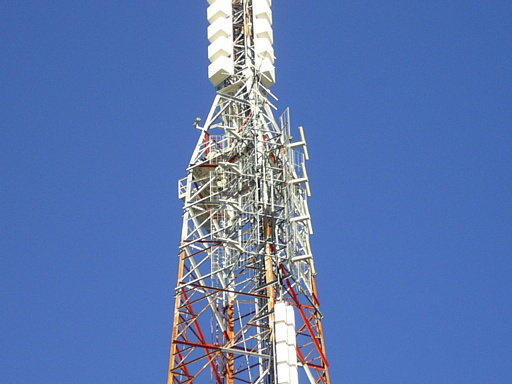
Close up view of Sugarloaf Communications Tower.

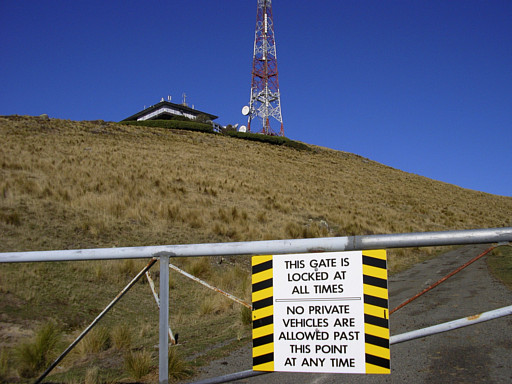
A gate prevents access to the transmitter site for private vehicles.

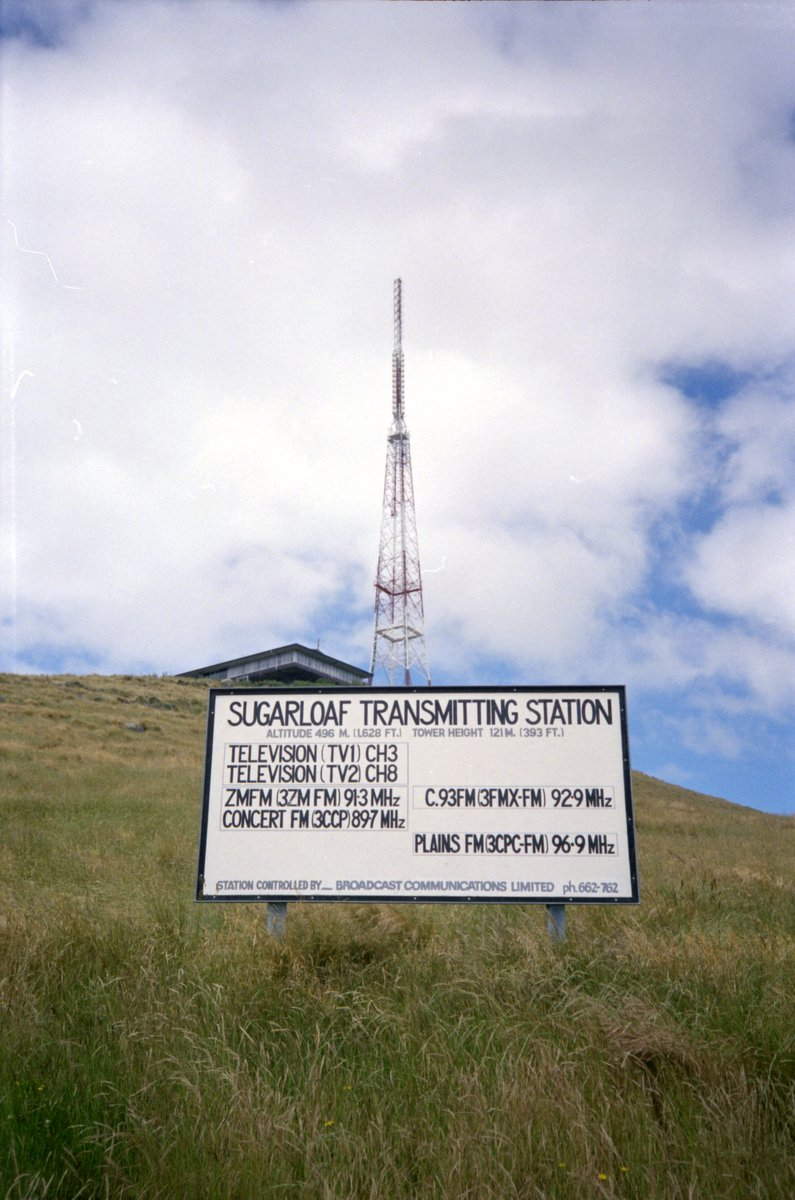
View of the tower from the carpark in 1990, showing old signage.

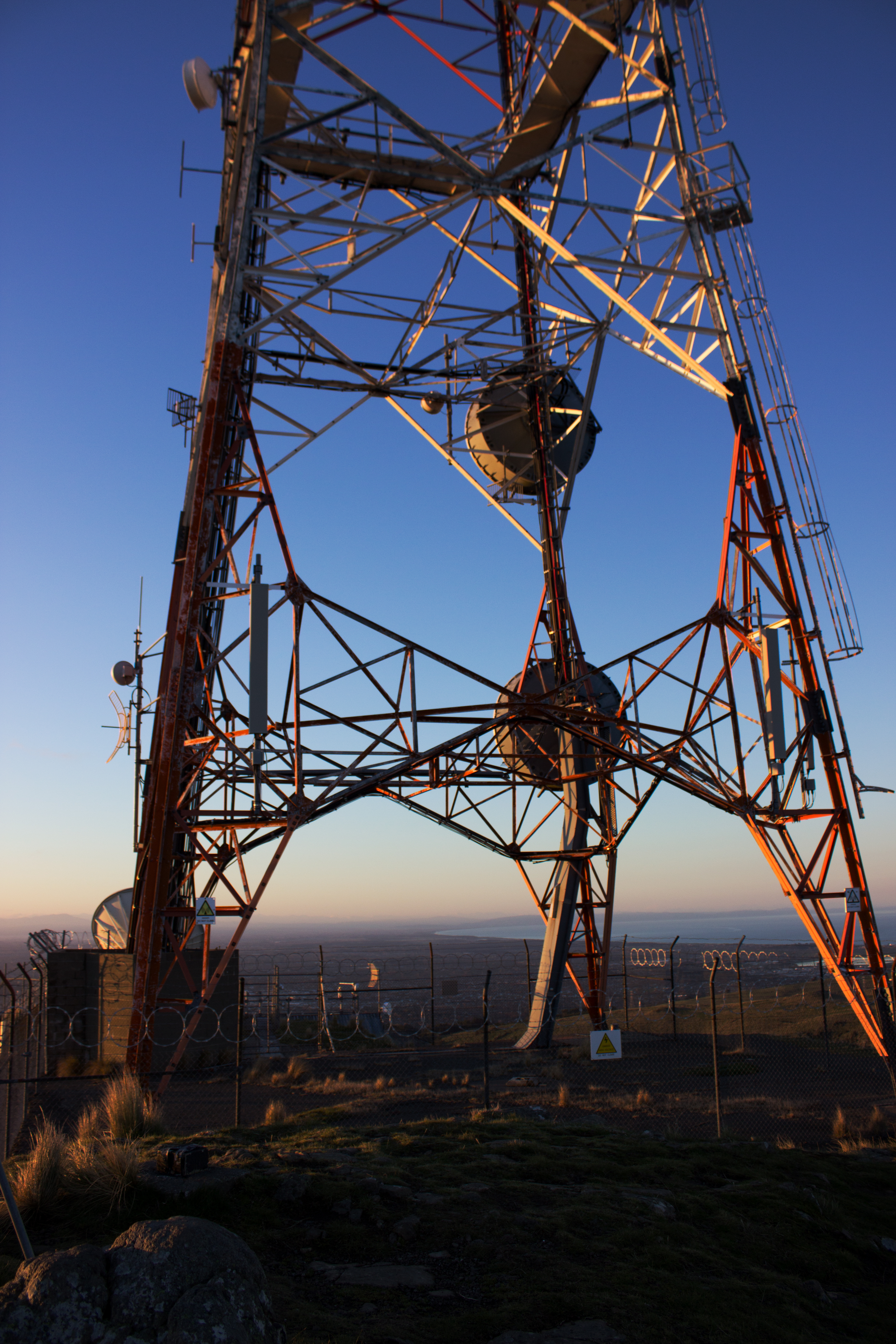
A close up of the tower base.

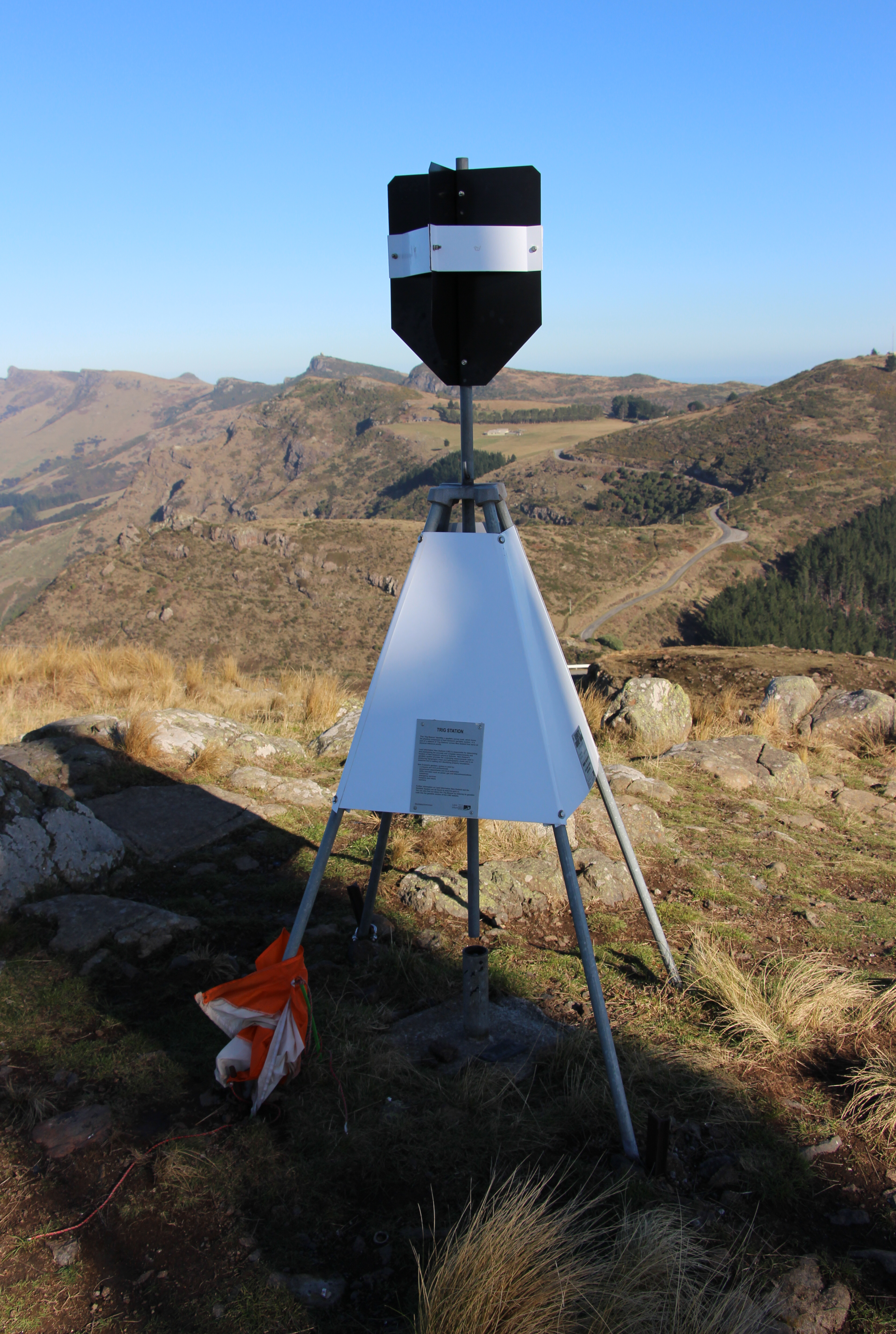
A survey point next to the Sugarloaf tower.

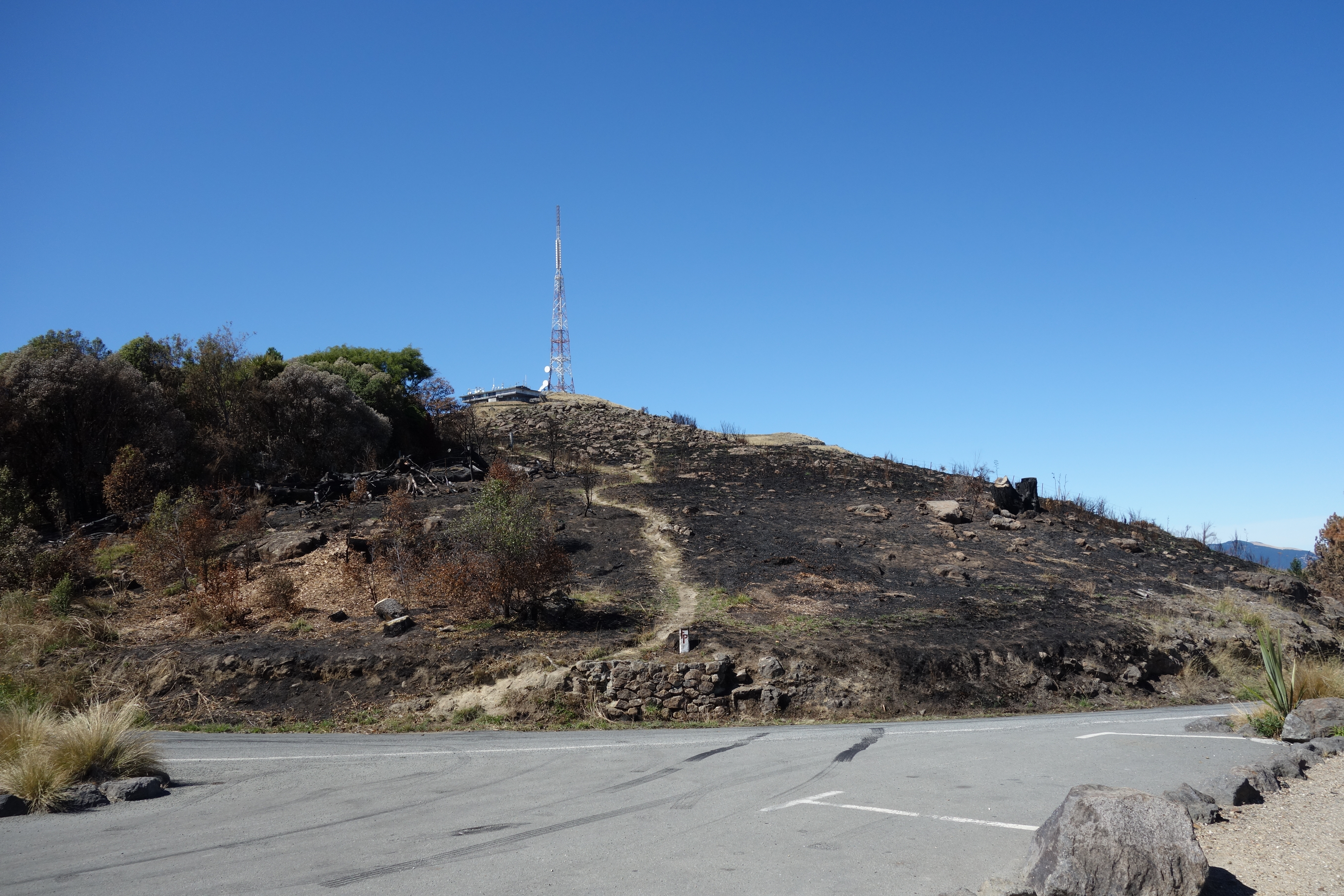
The Victoria Park fire close to the Sugarloaf tower.

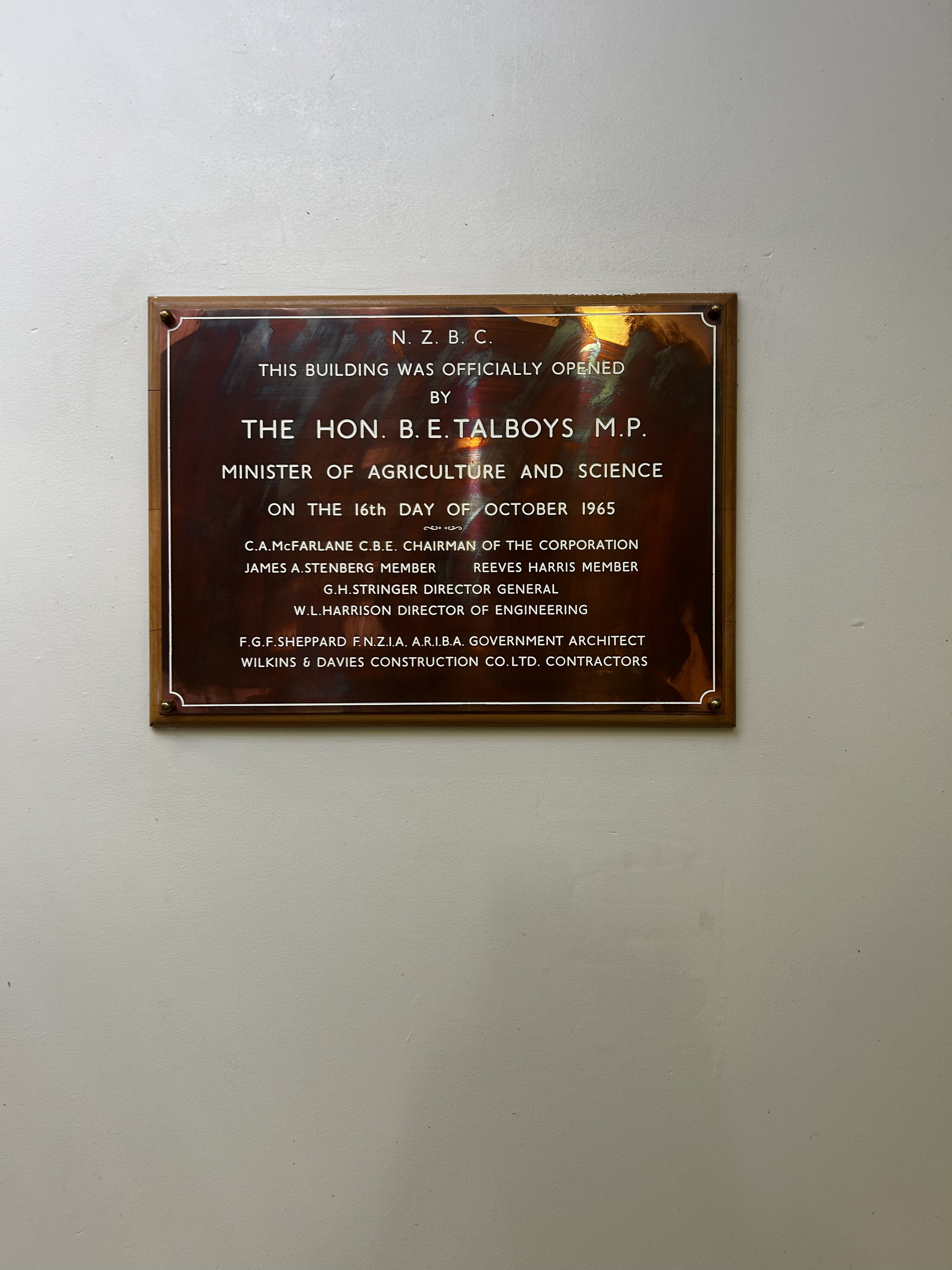
Informational Panel within the Sugar Loaf Transmission Tower.

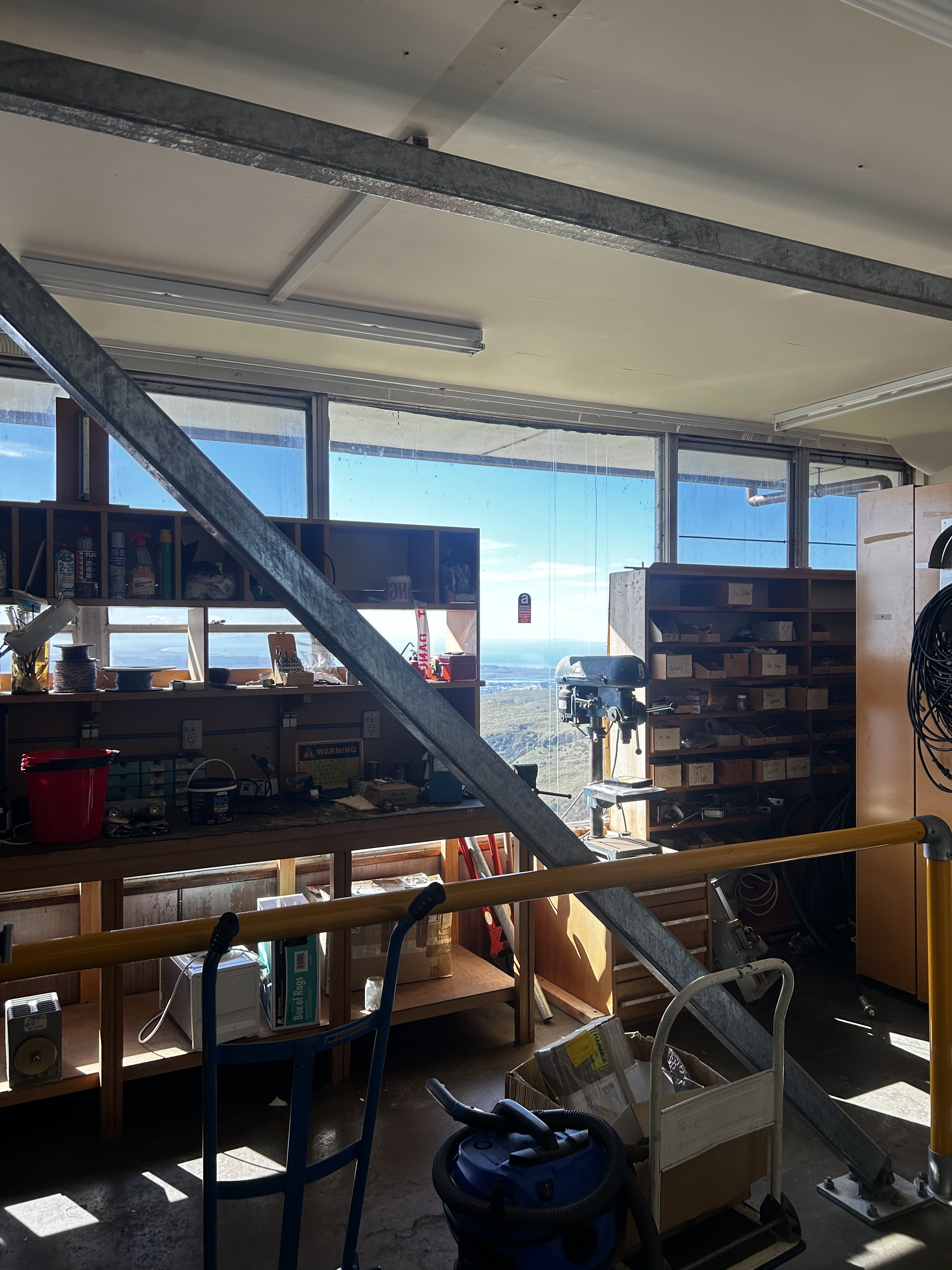
Internal workshop within the Sugar Loaf Transmission Tower - 2026.

== Management ==
The tower and building are currently owned and maintained by Kordia, previously known as Broadcast Communications Limited (BCL NZ).
