= Port Hills =

Range of hills of Canterbury, New Zealand

Coordinates: 43°35′24″S 172°41′24″E

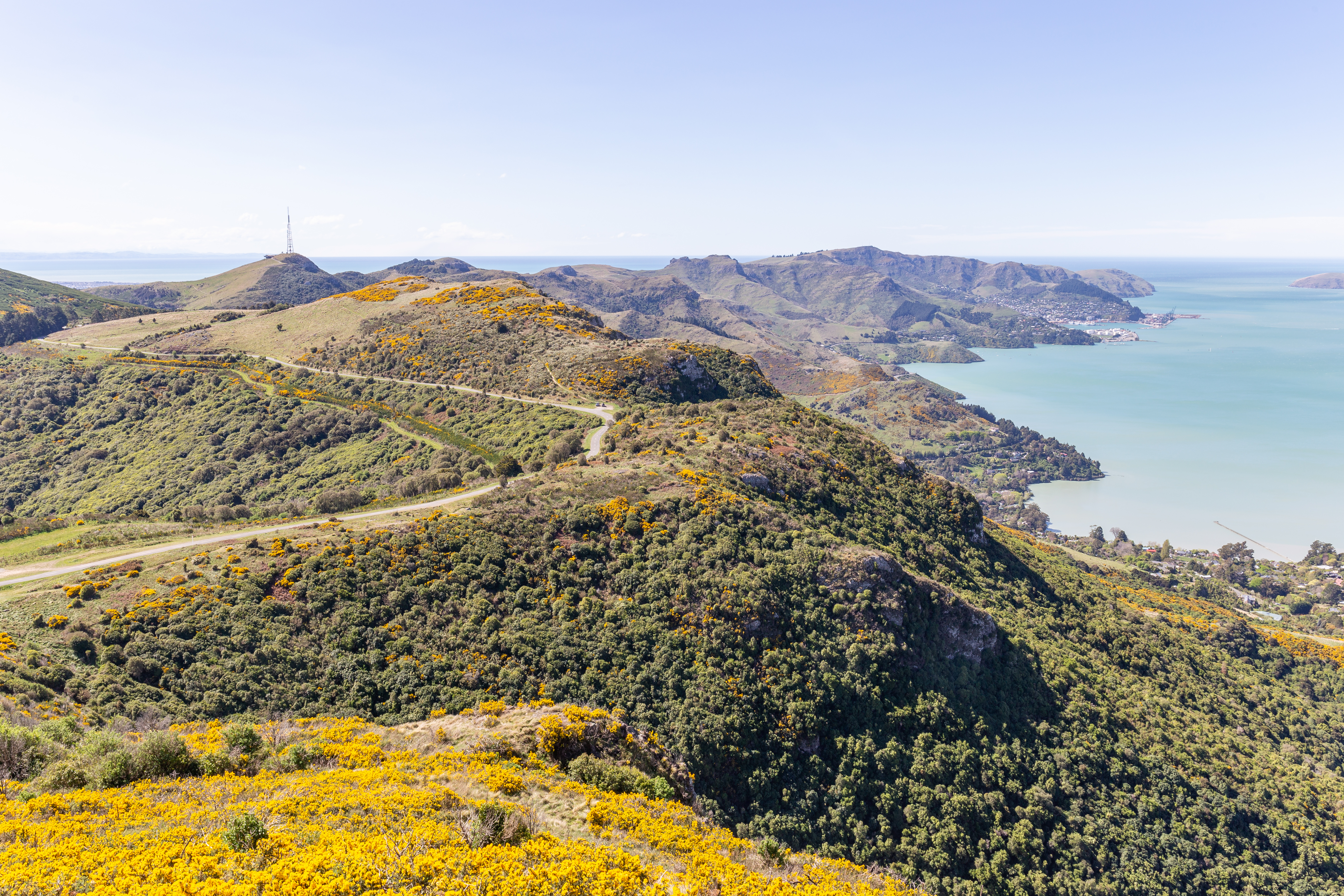
A portion of the Port Hills

The Port Hills (Māori: Ngā Kōhatu Whakarakaraka o Tamatea Pōkai Whenua) are a range of hills in Canterbury Region of New Zealand, so named because they lie between the city of Christchurch and its port at Lyttelton. They are an eroded remnant of the Lyttelton volcano, which erupted millions of years ago.

The hills start at Godley Head, run approximately east–west along the northern side of Lyttelton Harbour, and continue running to the south, dividing the city from the harbour. The range terminates near Gebbies Pass above the head of the harbour. The range includes a number of summits between 300 and 500 metres above sea level. The range is of significant geological, environmental and scenic importance.

== History ==
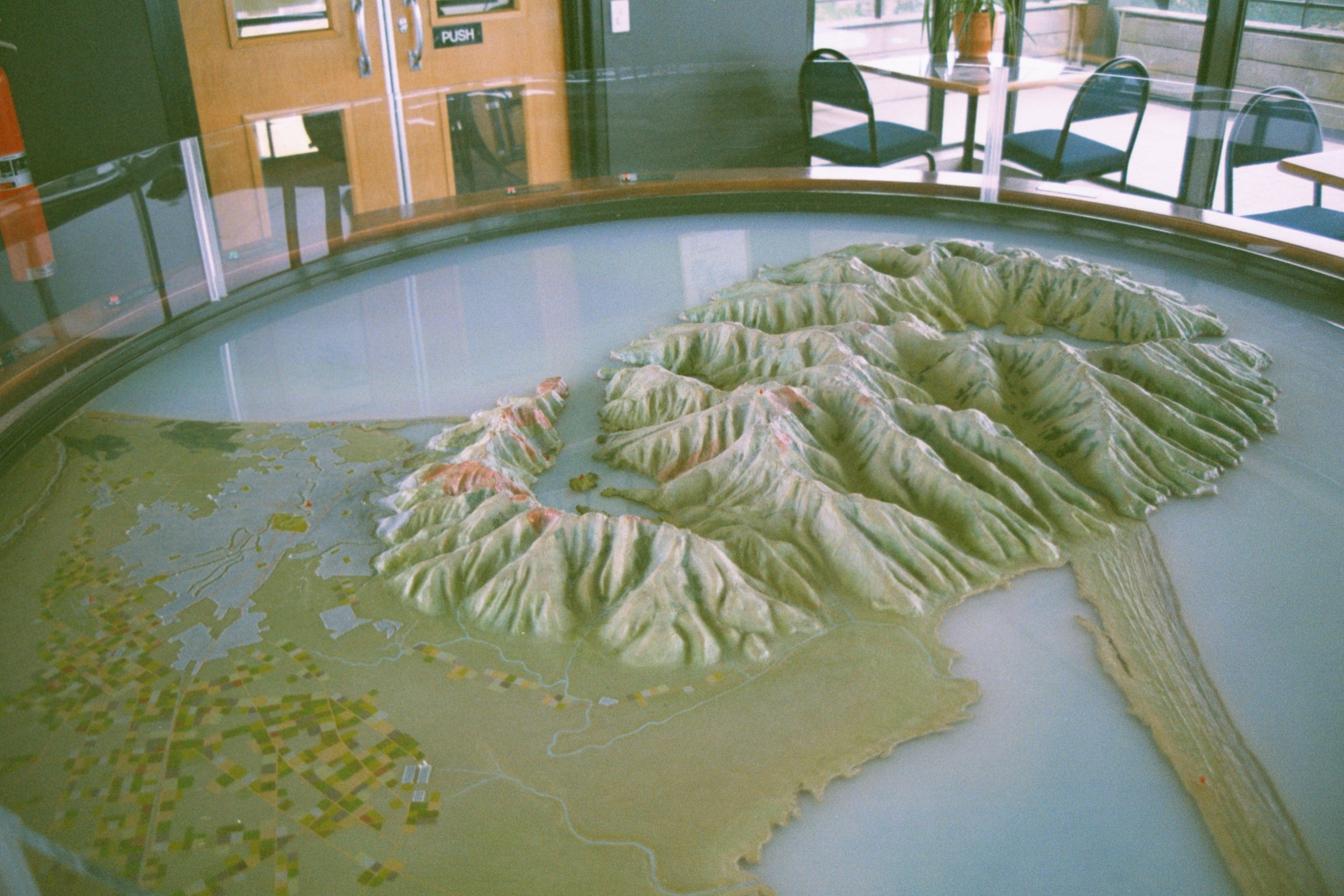
A model of the Banks Peninsula (vertically exaggerated); the Port Hills are the volcanic ridge on the left

The volcano is one of two from which Banks Peninsula was originally formed 12 million years ago. The area was first populated by Māori during the 14th century. During early European settlement some 500 years later the Port Hills presented a challenging barrier between the harbour and the planned settlement of Christchurch, their steepness and ruggedness making access extremely difficult. For approximately 17 years (1850–1867), the majority of settlers used the precipitous Bridle Path to transport themselves and their belongings to the plains on the other side. Today the Lyttelton road tunnel and a separate rail tunnel connect the port and the city suburbs, and three road routes crossing the range – via Evans, Dyers and Gebbies passes – are connected by the Summit Road.

Natural disasters (21st century)

- In February 2017, bush fires in the Port Hills burned for days, destroying over 1600 Ha of bush and nine homes.
- In February 2024 another major wildfire broke out on Worsleys Road on 14 February and burned around 700 hectares of bushland, destroyed one home, and prompted evacuations and a state of emergency.

== Geography and conservation ==
The Port Hills are a prominent feature of the central Canterbury landscape, being visible for many kilometres from the north and west.

The crest of the Port Hills varies somewhat in height, being lowest at the eastern (seaward) end. Two road passes traverse the Port Hills from Christchurch. Dyers Pass (elevation c. 330 m), almost due south of central Christchurch is the more prominent of the two passes. Evans Pass (elevation c. 200 m), which is near the eastern end of the Port Hills, normally connects Sumner and Lyttelton but was closed since the 2011 Christchurch earthquake caused significant damage to Sumner Road on the Lyttelton side of the pass until reopening in 2019.

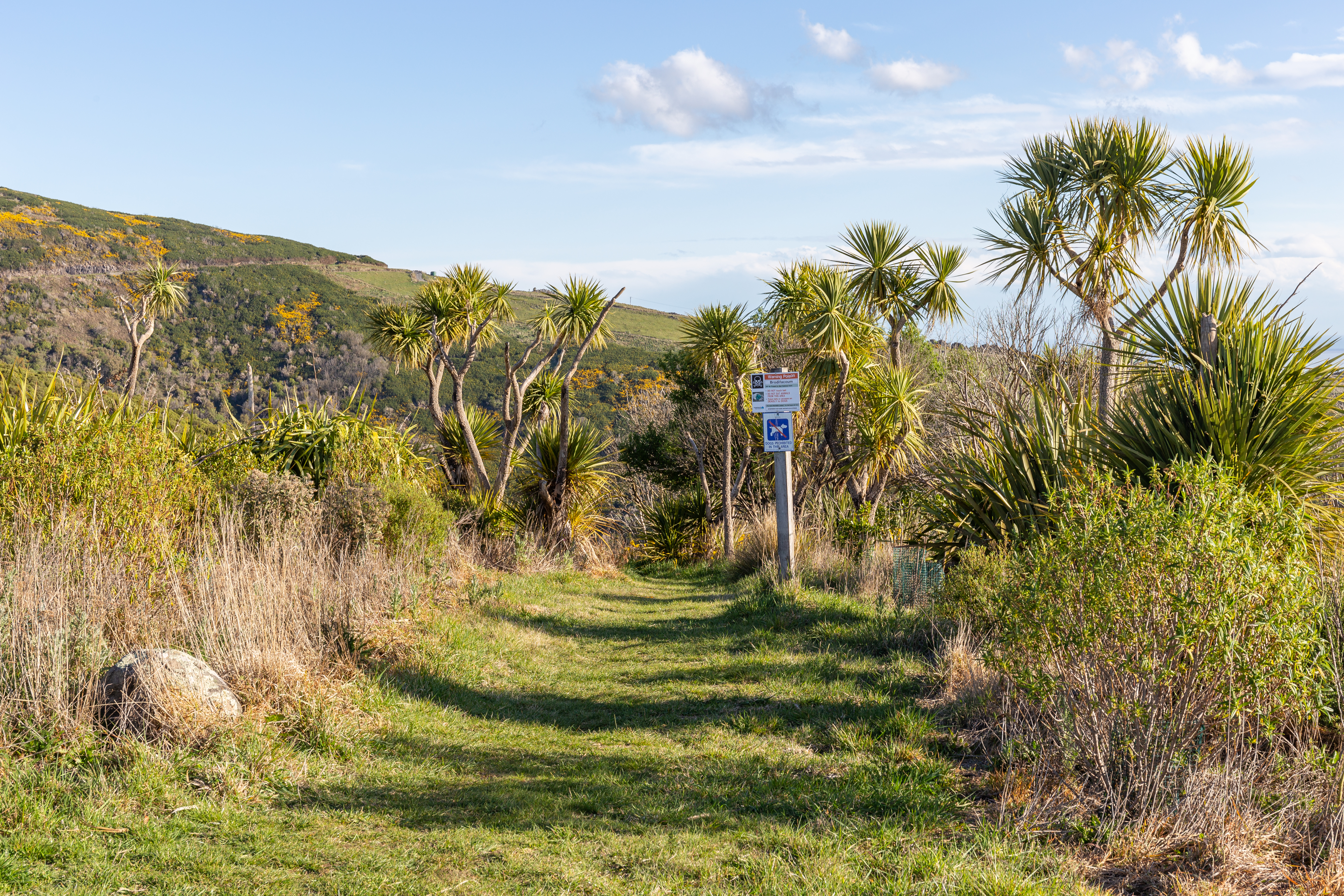
Kennedy's Bush Scenic Reserve

Between Evans Pass and Dyers Pass are several significant summits, including Sugarloaf (494 m), recognisable by the television transmission tower on its summit; Mount Cavendish (448 m); and Tauhinukorokio / Mount Pleasant (499 m), the highest peak in the northern arc of the Port Hills. West of Dyers Pass, the Port Hills curve away southward and become even higher, rising to 573 m at Coopers Knob. From Coopers Knob the crater rim descends to Gebbies Pass (elevation c. 160 m). The hills south and east of Gebbies Pass are regarded as part of Banks Peninsula proper rather than the Port Hills.

Several suburbs of Christchurch extend onto the northern slopes of the Port Hills, including Cashmere, Mt Pleasant, Heathcote Valley and Sumner. Other parts of the hills are used for farming and forestry, as well as a significant number of scenic reserves created for recreational and conservation purposes, following an initiative by Christchurch councillor Harry Ell at the turn of the 20th century. In 1948 the Summit Road Scenic Society was formed to continue development and maintenance of the reserves.

The hills are an important recreation area for Christchurch residents, with several public parks and reserves, including tracks for mountain biking and walking. A gondola lift to the top of Mount Cavendish was opened in 1992, providing convenient access to the summit and a major tourist attraction for the Canterbury area. The Christchurch Adventure Park was opened in 2016 which provides mountain biking opportunities on the slopes of Worsleys Hill. Road cycling is also very popular on the Port Hills with "short bays" and "long bays" being two of the most popular longer routes.

== Demographics ==
The statistical area of Port Hills covers 44.46 km^{2} (17.17 sq mi). It had an estimated population of 80 as of June 2025, with a population density of 1.8 people per km^{2}.

Historical population
Year	Pop.	±% p.a.
2006	84	—
2013	90	+0.99%
2018	72	−4.36%
2023	78	+1.61%

Port Hills had a population of 78 in the 2023 New Zealand census, an increase of 6 people (8.3%) since the 2018 census, and a decrease of 12 people (−13.3%) since the 2013 census. There were 39 males and 42 females in 30 dwellings. The median age was 46.9 years (compared with 38.1 years nationally). There were 12 people (15.4%) aged under 15 years, 12 (15.4%) aged 15 to 29, 45 (57.7%) aged 30 to 64, and 9 (11.5%) aged 65 or older.

People could identify as more than one ethnicity. The results were 96.2% European (Pākehā), 3.8% Māori, 3.8% Pasifika, 7.7% Asian, and 7.7% other, which includes people giving their ethnicity as "New Zealander". English was spoken by 100.0%, Māori by 3.8%, and other languages by 15.4%. The percentage of people born overseas was 23.1, compared with 28.8% nationally.

Religious affiliations were 26.9% Christian, and 3.8% other religions. People who answered that they had no religion were 65.4%, and 3.8% of people did not answer the census question.

Of those at least 15 years old, 18 (27.3%) people had a bachelor's or higher degree, 42 (63.6%) had a post-high school certificate or diploma, and 3 (4.5%) people exclusively held high school qualifications. The median income was $46,900, compared with $41,500 nationally. 15 people (22.7%) earned over $100,000 compared to 12.1% nationally. The employment status of those at least 15 was 36 (54.5%) full-time and 9 (13.6%) part-time.

== Flora and fauna ==
Despite the heavy deforestation and clearance of native bush that took place during early settlement, a diverse range of wildlife and plant life populates the Port Hills. Native birds such as the bellbird (korimako or koparara) fantail, silvereye, grey warbler and shining cuckoo are commonly found in the remaining bush. While the wood pigeon (kererū) often seen in the area is a native to New Zealand others, such as the common blackbird, common chaffinch and song thrush are introduced and very populous species. As well as a great many insect species, gecko and skink are commonly found.

Indigenous plant species such as Banks Peninsula hebe inhabit rock crevices along with rare ferns. The more exposed hillsides are covered with silver tussock and other native grasses, unusually so for an area so close to urban development.

The remaining podocarp forest contains 500- to 600-year-old mataī, tōtara and kahikatea trees as well as fruit and flowering species such as kōwhai, ribbonwood, māhoe, cabbage trees, kānuka and fuchsia.

Panoramic view of Port Hills from Mt Ada
