= Cashmere High School =

School in Christchurch, New Zealand

- Te iringa o Kahukura

Location
- 172 Rose Street; Somerfield; Christchurch 8024; New Zealand; 43.5659°S 172.6243°E

Information
- Funding type: State
- Motto: Leading Learning
- Established: 1956
- Ministry of Education Institution no.: 340
- Chairperson: James O'Connell
- Principal: John Stradwick
- Years: 9–13
- Gender: Co-educational
- Enrolment: 2,434 (July 2026)
- Colours: Burgundy, dark grey & dark gold
- Socio-economic decile: 9Q
- Website: cashmere.school.nz

Cashmere High School (Māori: Te iringa o Kahukura) is a state coeducational secondary school, located in southern Christchurch, New Zealand. It was opened in 1956 in response to population growth in southern Christchurch during the 1950s.

The school is located in the suburb of Cashmere, New Zealand, on the northern bank of the Ōpāwaho / Heathcote River overlooked by the Cashmere Hills. Serving Years 9 to 13, Cashmere has a roll of 2,434 students as of July 2026, making it the second-largest school in Christchurch after Burnside High School.

== History ==
The Cabinet approved construction of Cashmere High School on 15 March 1954. Tender for the construction of the school, initially accommodating 600 pupils, opened on 1 June 1954 and closed on 6 July. After the initial tenders were rejected and fresh tenders were called, construction was let in late October to P. Graham and Sons Ltd for £170,000. Construction of the school began on 26 October 1954. Terry McCombs, a former Member of the New Zealand House of Representatives who had served as Minister of Education from 1947 to 1949, was appointed as the school's foundation headmaster in August 1955.

Cashmere High School opened to students on 1 February 1956, with an initial intake of 190 third-form (now Year 9) students. The school was officially opened on 29 November 1956 by Minister of Education Ronald Algie.

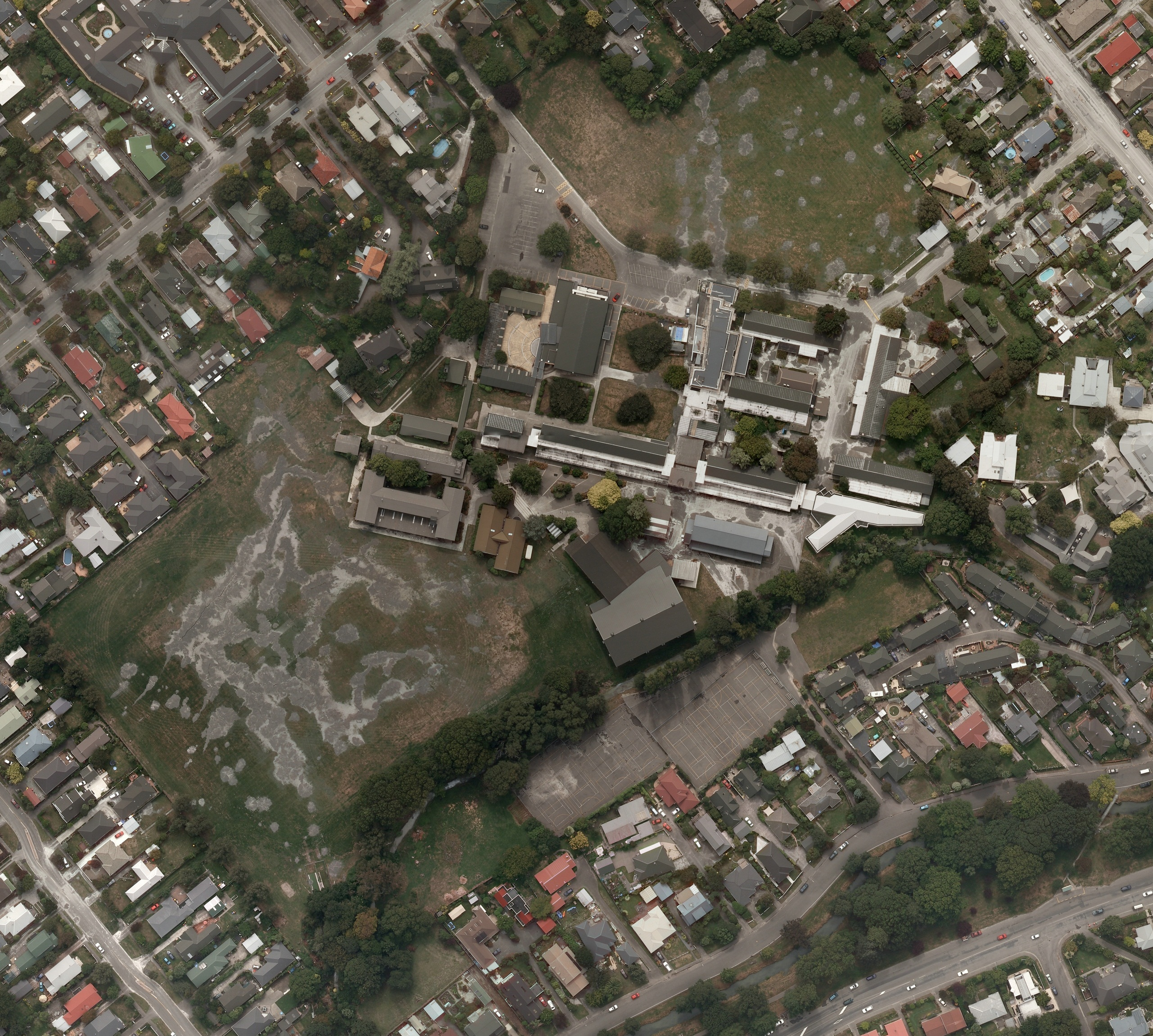
Aerial photo of Cashmere High School taken on 24 February 2011, two days after the 2011 Christchurch earthquake. Soil liquefaction can be clearly seen on the playing fields.

Cashmere suffered moderate damage in the 22 February 2011 Christchurch earthquake, mainly from liquefaction. On the day, the school had closed for instruction for the day at 12:00 pm due to the Post Primary Teachers' Association, the main secondary school teachers' trade union, holding a paid union meeting that afternoon, meaning very few students and staff were on site when the quake struck at 12:51 pm. The school reopened on 14 March after the school buildings were inspected and deemed safe, and essential repairs and temporary fixes had been carried out. In the aftermath of the earthquake, the school played host to Linwood College in a site sharing agreement while Linwood's severely damaged facilities were inspected and repaired. Cashmere used the site in the morning, while Linwood used the site in the afternoon for five months, until Linwood College moved back to its original site on 1 August.

The current principal, John Stradwick, replaced Joe Eccleton in October 2024.

Location of Cashmere High School within Christchurch

== Enrolment ==
Cashmere operates an enrolment scheme to help curb roll numbers and prevent overcrowding. The school's home zone, in which students residing are automatically entitled to be enrolled without rejection, covers the southern suburbs of Christchurch as well as the settlements around the western and southern shores of Lyttelton Harbour. Suburbs and towns within the zone include Beckenham, Cashmere, Huntsbury, Murray Aynsley, Saint Martins, Somerfield, Spreydon, Sydenham, and Westmorland; parts of Addington and Hoon Hay; Hillsborough, Opawa and Waltham west of State Highway 76; and Governors Bay, Diamond Harbour, and Port Levy. Students residing outside the zone are accepted as roll places allow per the enrolment scheme order of preference and secret ballot.

At the October 2013 Education Review Office (ERO) review, Cashmere had 1666 students enrolled, including 46 international students. There was an even number of male and female students. Seventy-five percent of students identified as New Zealand European (Pākehā), nine percent as Māori, three percent each as Asian, and Pasifika, and ten percent as another ethnicity.

As of July 2026, Cashmere High School has roll of 2,434 students, of which 241 (9.9%) identify as Māori.

As of 2026, Cashmere High School has an Equity Index of 413, placing it amongst schools whose students have few socioeconomic barriers to achievement (roughly equivalent to deciles 8 and 9 under the former socio-economic decile system).

== Academics ==
Cashmere High School operates a regular timetable with five 55-minute teaching periods per day, except on Wednesdays where teaching periods are only 50 minutes each.

In Year 9, English, Mathematics, Science, Social Studies, Physical Education and Health are compulsory and are studied for the whole year, while students rotate through four Technology subjects: Design Technologies, Graphic Communication, Materials and Electronics and Control, and Food Technology, studying one of them per school term. Students choose two Arts options out of Visual Art, Drama and Music to study for two terms each, and a Foreign Language option out of French, Japanese, Te Reo Māori and Spanish. There are no optional subjects.

In Year 10, English, Mathematics, Science, Social Studies, Physical Education and Health remain compulsory subjects. Students elect between two and four optional subjects to fill the two remaining subject lines on their timetable – either two full-year subjects, a full-year and two half-year subjects, or four half-year subjects.

In Years 11 to 13, students complete the National Certificate of Educational Achievement (NCEA), the main secondary school qualification in New Zealand. Levels 1, 2 and 3 of NCEA are usually completed in years 11, 12 and 13 respectively, although students can choose subjects from different levels depending on their progress through the NCEA level system. Students study six subjects per year (five in Year 13), with English being compulsory in Years 11 and 12, and Mathematics and Science being compulsory in Year 11.

In 2013, 91.4 percent of students leaving Cashmere High held at least NCEA Level 1, 79.6 percent held at least NCEA Level 2, and 54.0 percent held at least University Entrance. This compares nationally to 85.2%, 74.2%, and 49.0% respectively.

=== Conductive education ===
The school has a conductive education unit, which opened in 2002, and caters for up to 20 secondary school-aged students.

== Co-curricular ==
=== School houses ===
Cashmere has six school houses into which students are grouped, each is named after a notable New Zealander.

Blake	Named after yachtsman Sir Peter Blake
Britten	Named after motorcycle builder John Britten
Cooper	Named after Maori activist Whina Cooper
Ngata	Named after politician and lawyer Sir Āpirana Ngata
Rutherford	Named after scientist Ernest Rutherford
Sheppard	Named after suffragette Kate Sheppard

== Principals ==
Since its foundation in 1956, Cashmere High School has had eight principals. The following is a complete list:

	Name	Term
1	Terry McCombs	1956–1972
2	Ron Chapman	1973–1980
3	John Murdoch	1981–1991
4	Bob Wilson	1991–1997
5	Dave Turnbull	1997–2009
6	Mark Wilson	2009–2019
7	Joe Eccleton	2019–2024
8	John Stradwick	2024–present

== Notable alumni ==
- Ben Campbell – member of the band "Zed" and later Atlas
- Lyn Davis – All Black (1976–77) and Canterbury rugby union player
- Greg Draper – football (soccer) player
- Guyon Espiner – TV personality and political editor for TVNZ
- Stephen Fleming – cricketer
- Alex Frame – track cyclist
- Mike Gilchrist – runner that represented NZ at Commonwealth games in 1986
- Nathan King – member of the band "Zed"
- Quentin Macfarlane – marine painter
- Steve McCabe (1980–1984) – songwriter / musician notable for work with The Axemen in Christchurch and solo and collective work elsewhere in New Zealand and across the world.
- Adrian Palmer – member of the band "Zed"
- Bob Parker (c. 1966–1970) – mayor of Christchurch (2007–13)
- Bic Runga (1989–93) – singer
- Ethan Rusbatch (2005–09) – basketball player
- Jack Tame – TV and radio host
- Yulia Townsend – singer
- Richard Wilson – football (soccer) player
- Luke Di Somma – lyricist, composer, writer and director
- Susan Wakefield (foundation pupil) – tax expert, philanthropist
