= Port Hills (electorate) =

Port Hills electorate boundaries used from the 2014 election until 2020

Port Hills was a parliamentary electorate of New Zealand that existed for the 2008 through 2017 general elections. Ruth Dyson of the Labour Party had previously held the Banks Peninsula electorate since the 1999 election that was largely replaced by Port Hills, and held Port Hills for its entire existence before retiring ahead of the 2020 election. The Port Hills electorate was mostly urban, and lost the more rural Banks Peninsula areas of the old electorate to the Selwyn electorate that was also formed for the 2008 election.

Ahead of the 2020 election, the boundaries were again adjusted and Port Hills abolished. Most of its area is now covered by the Banks Peninsula electorate.

== Population centres ==
Port Hills was created after a review of electoral boundaries conducted in the wake of the 2006 census of population and dwellings. The bulk of Port Hills came from the old Banks Peninsula electorate, including the suburbs of Opawa and Woolston, the suburban areas around the Cashmere Hills, and the towns on the north coast of Lyttelton Harbour. The south Christchurch suburbs of Bromley and Sydenham have been added from Christchurch East and Wigram, respectively. Most of the electorate was urban.

The following suburbs, in alphabetical order, were at least partially located in the electorate: Balmoral Hill, Beckenham, Bromley, Cashmere, Cass Bay, Clifton, Corsair Bay, Ferrymead, Governors Bay, Heathcote Valley, Hillsborough, Huntsbury, Linwood, Lyttelton, Moncks Bay, Moncks Spur, Mount Pleasant, Murray Aynsley Hill, Opawa, Te Rāpaki-o-Te Rakiwhakaputa, Redcliffs, Richmond Hill, Scarborough, St Andrews Hill, St Martins, Sumner, Sydenham, Taylors Mistake, Waltham, and Woolston.

Port Hills was one of the electorates worst affected by the 2010 and 2011 earthquakes and suffered minor population loss as a result. The 2013 redistribution resulted in the electorate losing the areas around Bromley and Sydenham but regaining Halswell back from Selwyn.

Port Hills was abolished for the 2020 general election, being replaced largely by a recreated Banks Peninsula. This was to absorb population growth in neighbouring Selwyn.

== History ==
Because the new suburbs were strong Labour-voting areas, Banks Peninsula MP Ruth Dyson retained the electorate despite a nationwide swing to the National Party in 2008. This was also one of the electorates which elected a Labour MP but where the National Party won the party vote. National's candidate in 2008 was Terry Heffernan (1952–2010), who at that time was already weakened by cancer.

In the 2011 election, Dyson contested the electorate against David Carter. Dyson and Carter had contested before; in 1993, Dyson was successful in the Lyttelton electorate, but in 1996 in Banks Peninsula, Carter had the upper hand. In 1999, 2002, and 2005, Dyson was always in first place, and she was again successful in 2011.

In the 2014 election, the National Party put up Nuk Korako against Dyson; Carter had in the meantime been elected Speaker of the House of Representatives and as such, was not contesting an electorate any longer. Based on preliminary counts, Dyson has a majority of 1,865 votes over Korako.

In the boundary review of 2019/2020, the Representation Commission decided to make large changes to the boundaries of Port Hills, taking area in Halswell and parts of Bromley out and adding Banks Peninsula in, to manage large changes in population in the Christchurch and Selwyn areas. The electorate was also re-recreated as Banks Peninsula.

=== Members of Parliament ===
Key

Labour National NZ First Green

Election	Winner
2008 election	Ruth Dyson
2011 election	Ruth Dyson
2014 election	Ruth Dyson
2017 election	Ruth Dyson
(Electorate abolished in 2020; see Banks Peninsula)

=== List MPs ===
Election	Winner
2011 election	David Carter
2011 election	Denis O'Rourke
2014 election	Nuk Korako
2014 election	Eugenie Sage
2014 election	Denis O'Rourke
2017 election	Nuk Korako (Note: Korako resigned as a list MP effective 16 May 2019.)
2017 election	Eugenie Sage

== Election results ==
=== 2017 election ===
2017 general election: Port Hills
Notes:	Blue background denotes the winner of the electorate vote. Pink background denotes a candidate elected from their party list. Yellow background denotes an electorate win by a list member, or other incumbent. A ✓ or ✗ denotes status of any incumbent, win or lose respectively.						
Party	Candidate	Votes	%	±%	Party votes	%	±%
Labour	✓ Ruth Dyson	22,603	53.89	+7.45	16,825	39.40	+15.53
National	Nuk Korako	14,687	35.02	−5.72	17,381	40.70	−6.26
Green	Eugenie Sage	3,143	7.49	−0.33	4,392	10.29	−6.80
NZ First	Denis O'Rourke	1,258	3.00	+0.11	2,064	4.83	−1.79
ACT	David Fox	189	0.45	+0.08	153	0.39	−0.08
Democrats	Gary Gribben	60	0.14	+0.01	22	0.05	−0.05
Opportunities					1,459	3.42	–
Māori Party					140	0.33	−0.09
Legalise Cannabis					91	0.21	−0.09
Conservative					80	0.19	−2.92
United Future					24	0.06	−0.14
Outdoors					23	0.05	–
Ban 1080					18	0.04	−0.04
People's Party					12	0.03	–
Internet					11	0.03	−0.72 (Note: 2017 Internet Party swing is relative to the votes for Internet-Mana in 2014; it shared a party list with Mana Party in the 2014 election)
Mana Party					5	0.01	−0.74 (Note: 2017 Mana Party swing is relative to the votes for Internet-Mana in 2014; it shared a party list with the Internet Party in the 2014 election)
Informal votes		360			110		
Total valid votes		41,490			42,700		
Turnout		42,810					
Labour hold	Majority	7,916	18.87	+13.70			

=== 2014 election ===
2014 general election: Port Hills
Notes:	Blue background denotes the winner of the electorate vote. Pink background denotes a candidate elected from their party list. Yellow background denotes an electorate win by a list member, or other incumbent. A ✓ or ✗ denotes status of any incumbent, win or lose respectively.						
Party	Candidate	Votes	%	±%	Party votes	%	±%
Labour	✓ Ruth Dyson	18,161	46.44	−1.97	9,514	23.87	−3.77
National	Nuk Korako	15,933	40.74	+1.85	18,719	46.96	+3.30
Green	Eugenie Sage	3,059	7.82	−2.18	6,812	17.09	−2.51
NZ First	Denis O'Rourke	1,131	2.89	+0.75	2,641	6.62	+1.79
Conservative	Chris Brosnan	626	1.60	+1.60	1,241	3.11	+1.46
ACT	Geoff Russell	145	0.37	−0.18	175	0.44	−0.30
Democrats	Gary J Gribben	52	0.13	+0.13	41	0.10	+0.04
Internet Mana					298	0.75	+0.44 (Note: 2014 Internet Mana swing is relative to the votes for Mana in 2011; it shared a party list with Internet in the 2014 election.)
Māori Party					160	0.40	−0.01
Legalise Cannabis					120	0.30	−0.19
United Future					80	0.20	−0.27
Ban 1080					33	0.08	+0.08
Civilian					26	0.07	+0.07
Focus					4	0.01	+0.01
Independent Coalition					1	0.00	+0.00
Informal votes		277			105		
Total valid votes		39,384			39,970		
Turnout		39,970	81.29	+4.80			
Labour hold	Majority	2,228	5.70	−3.83			

=== 2011 election ===
2011 general election: Port Hills
Notes:	Blue background denotes the winner of the electorate vote. Pink background denotes a candidate elected from their party list. Yellow background denotes an electorate win by a list member, or other incumbent. A ✓ or ✗ denotes status of any incumbent, win or lose respectively.						
Party	Candidate	Votes	%	±%	Party votes	%	±%
Labour	✓ Ruth Dyson	15,737	48.41	+1.69	9,199	27.64	−10.04
National	David Carter	12,640	38.89	+1.74	14,532	43.66	+6.53
Green	Joseph Burston	3,252	10.00	+0.39	6,522	19.60	+5.82
NZ First	Denis O'Rourke	697	2.14	+2.14	1,609	4.83	+2.08
ACT	Geoff Russell	179	0.55	−0.84	246	0.74	−1.63
Conservative					549	1.65	+1.65
Legalise Cannabis					164	0.49	+0.07
United Future					157	0.47	−0.42
Māori Party					135	0.41	−0.28
Mana					102	0.31	+0.31
Alliance					24	0.07	−0.07
Libertarianz					22	0.07	+0.02
Democrats					21	0.06	+0.02
Informal votes		542			202		
Total valid votes		32,505			33,282		
Labour hold	Majority	3,097	9.53	−0.05			

Electorate (as at 26 November 2011): 43,511

=== 2008 election ===
2008 general election: Port Hills
Notes:	Blue background denotes the winner of the electorate vote. Pink background denotes a candidate elected from their party list. Yellow background denotes an electorate win by a list member, or other incumbent. A ✓ or ✗ denotes status of any incumbent, win or lose respectively.						
Party	Candidate	Votes	%	±%	Party votes	%	±%
Labour	Ruth Dyson	16,834	46.72		13,816	37.68	
National	Terry Heffernan	13,382	37.14		13,614	37.13	
Green	Joseph Burston	3,464	9.61		5,051	13.78	
Progressive	Phil Clearwater	1,144	3.18		958	2.61	
ACT	Geoff Russell	500	1.39		868	2.37	
Kiwi	Wilton Gray	337	0.94		285	0.78	
United Future	Robin Andrew Loomes	215	0.60		326	0.89	
Alliance	Andrew John McKenzie	153	0.42		51	0.14	
NZ First					1,009	2.75	
Māori Party					250	0.68	
Legalise Cannabis					155	0.42	
Bill and Ben					152	0.41	
Family Party					49	0.13	
Pacific					23	0.06	
Workers Party					19	0.05	
Libertarianz					17	0.05	
Democrats					14	0.04	
RONZ					4	0.01	
RAM					2	0.01	
Informal votes		301			132		
Total valid votes		36,029			36,663		
Turnout		36,795	82.88				
Labour win new seat	Majority	3,452					
