= Hillsborough, New Zealand =

There are three places called Hillsborough in New Zealand:

- Hillsborough, Auckland, a suburb of Auckland
- Hillsborough, Christchurch, a suburb of Christchurch
- Hillsborough, New Plymouth, an outer suburb of New Plymouth
