= Waltham, New Zealand =

Suburb of Christchurch, New Zealand

Waltham
- Suburb
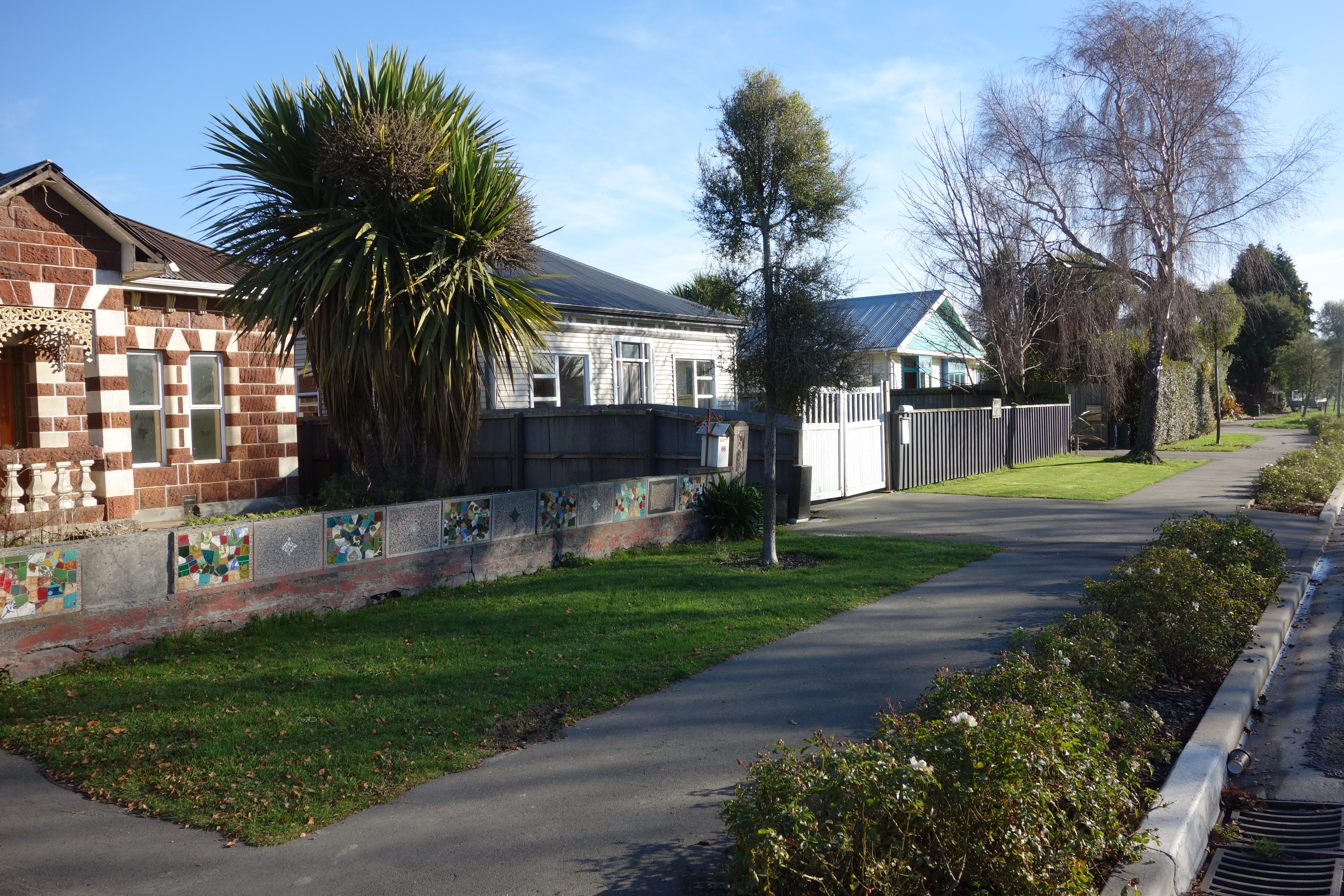
- Houses on Laurence Street
- Interactive map of Waltham
- Coordinates: 43.55109°S 172.64684°E
- Country: New Zealand
- City: Christchurch
- Local authority: Christchurch City Council
- Electoral ward: Heathcote; Central
- Community board: Waihoro Spreydon-Cashmere-Heathcote; Waipapa Papanui-Innes-Central

Area
  - Land: 206 ha (510 acres)

Population (June 2025)
  - Total: 4,460
  - Density: 2,170/km^{2} (5,610/sq mi)

Christchurch Central City	Phillipstown
Sydenham	Waltham	Woolston
Beckenham	St Martins	Opawa

Waltham is an inner suburb of Christchurch, New Zealand, located approximately 2 kilometres (1.2 miles) south-east of the city centre. State Highway 76, part of Christchurch's ring road system, and known there as Brougham Street, runs through the suburb, as does the Lyttelton Line rail corridor. Amenities include Lancaster Park, Christchurch's former sports venue, now a community park, and Waltham pool.

Approximate boundaries of the suburb are Waltham Road, Moorhouse Avenue, Ferry Road, Ensors Road, and the Ōpāwaho / Heathcote River. Waltham was originally part of the Sydenham borough and was incorporated into the City of Christchurch in 1903 when the borough was ended. In the early 1980s local residents and the Christchurch city council tried to name the western part of the suburb, Charleston, between Ferry Road and Ensors Road. This was done to maintain the residential nature of the area against perceived industrial expansion. The attempt was partly successful and that area today is referred to as both Waltham and Charleston.

The full suburb is a mixture of residential and both light and heavy industry.

== History ==
An early Christchurch settler, Charles Prince, owned a large house, called Waltham House, on nearby Colombo Street South. In 1866, a meeting of local residents was held at the house and it unanimously agreed to name the district of the present day suburb, Waltham.

The Christchurch gasworks was located at the inner boundary of Waltham until its closure around 1980.

Waltham was home to a malt works and a collection of warehouses on Waltham road. These were demolished and redeveloped into 88 two and three bedroom townhouses after the 2011 Christchurch earthquakes.

=== Waltham Mechanical Hub ===
In 2026 the Minister for Rail the Hon Winston Peters opened on 26 April the Waltham Mechanical Hub as the main South Island locomotive, carriage and wagon maintenance facility. The hub brings staff from existing sites in Addington, Middleton and Waltham into a new building of 9,400 sq m with 25 maintenance berths, five overhead cranes and equipment like an underfloor wheel lathe, a wheelset drop table and loco axle weigh systems. They are supported by 32 office staff. There are 32 track turnouts and 5 or 6 km of track. On the roof are 774 solar panels producing about 356 kw of power.

== Demographics ==
Waltham comprises three statistical areas. Waltham and Charleston are primarily residential. Lancaster Park is an L-shaped area which extends north on the western side of Nursery Street to Cashel Street.

Individual statistical areas
Name	Area (km^{2})	Population	Density (per km^{2})	Dwellings	Median age	Median income
Waltham	0.59	2,169	3,676	1,008	33.5 years	$42,500
Charleston	0.36	1,524	4,233	684	32.3 years	$41,300
Lancaster Park	1.12	228	204	78	35.2 years	$36,200
New Zealand					38.1 years	$41,500

=== Residential areas ===
The residential areas cover 0.95 km^{2} (0.37 sq mi). They had an estimated population of 4,180 as of June 2025, with a population density of 4,400 people per km^{2}.

Historical population of residential areas
Year	Pop.	±% p.a.
2006	2,922	—
2013	3,012	+0.43%
2018	3,339	+2.08%
2023	3,693	+2.04%

The residential areas had a population of 3,693 in the 2023 New Zealand census, an increase of 354 people (10.6%) since the 2018 census, and an increase of 681 people (22.6%) since the 2013 census. There were 1,851 males, 1,794 females, and 45 people of other genders in 1,692 dwellings. 7.3% of people identified as LGBTIQ+. There were 522 people (14.1%) aged under 15 years, 1,041 (28.2%) aged 15 to 29, 1,803 (48.8%) aged 30 to 64, and 330 (8.9%) aged 65 or older.

People could identify as more than one ethnicity. The results were 64.7% European (Pākehā); 14.1% Māori; 5.3% Pasifika; 23.2% Asian; 3.7% Middle Eastern, Latin American and African New Zealanders (MELAA); and 3.1% other, which includes people giving their ethnicity as "New Zealander". English was spoken by 94.6%, Māori by 3.6%, Samoan by 1.7%, and other languages by 21.4%. No language could be spoken by 2.8% (e.g. too young to talk). New Zealand Sign Language was known by 0.6%. The percentage of people born overseas was 33.6, compared with 28.8% nationally.

Religious affiliations were 27.9% Christian, 4.5% Hindu, 1.7% Islam, 0.6% Māori religious beliefs, 1.7% Buddhist, 0.8% New Age, and 4.1% other religions. People who answered that they had no religion were 51.7%, and 6.8% of people did not answer the census question.

Of those at least 15 years old, 876 (27.6%) people had a bachelor's or higher degree, 1,572 (49.6%) had a post-high school certificate or diploma, and 729 (23.0%) people exclusively held high school qualifications. 162 people (5.1%) earned over $100,000 compared to 12.1% nationally. The employment status of those at least 15 was 1,806 (57.0%) full-time, 387 (12.2%) part-time, and 144 (4.5%) unemployed.

=== Lancaster Park ===
The Lancaster Park statistical area covers 1.12 km^{2} (0.43 sq mi). It had an estimated population of 280 as of June 2025, with a population density of 250 people per km^{2}.

Historical population of Lancaster Park
Year	Pop.	±% p.a.
2006	258	—
2013	219	−2.31%
2018	243	+2.10%
2023	228	−1.27%

Lancaster Park had a population of 228 in the 2023 New Zealand census, a decrease of 15 people (−6.2%) since the 2018 census, and an increase of 9 people (4.1%) since the 2013 census. There were 141 males and 87 females in 78 dwellings. 5.3% of people identified as LGBTIQ+. The median age was 35.2 years (compared with 38.1 years nationally). There were 33 people (14.5%) aged under 15 years, 60 (26.3%) aged 15 to 29, 114 (50.0%) aged 30 to 64, and 21 (9.2%) aged 65 or older.

People could identify as more than one ethnicity. The results were 57.9% European (Pākehā); 27.6% Māori; 9.2% Pasifika; 25.0% Asian; and 1.3% Middle Eastern, Latin American and African New Zealanders (MELAA). English was spoken by 96.1%, Māori by 11.8%, Samoan by 2.6%, and other languages by 18.4%. No language could be spoken by 1.3% (e.g. too young to talk). New Zealand Sign Language was known by 1.3%. The percentage of people born overseas was 34.2, compared with 28.8% nationally.

Religious affiliations were 30.3% Christian, 3.9% Hindu, 3.9% Māori religious beliefs, 2.6% New Age, and 2.6% other religions. People who answered that they had no religion were 51.3%, and 7.9% of people did not answer the census question.

Of those at least 15 years old, 42 (21.5%) people had a bachelor's or higher degree, 96 (49.2%) had a post-high school certificate or diploma, and 60 (30.8%) people exclusively held high school qualifications. The median income was $36,200, compared with $41,500 nationally. 6 people (3.1%) earned over $100,000 compared to 12.1% nationally. The employment status of those at least 15 was 105 (53.8%) full-time, 27 (13.8%) part-time, and 15 (7.7%) unemployed.

Cottages typical of the suburb of Waltham (2022)

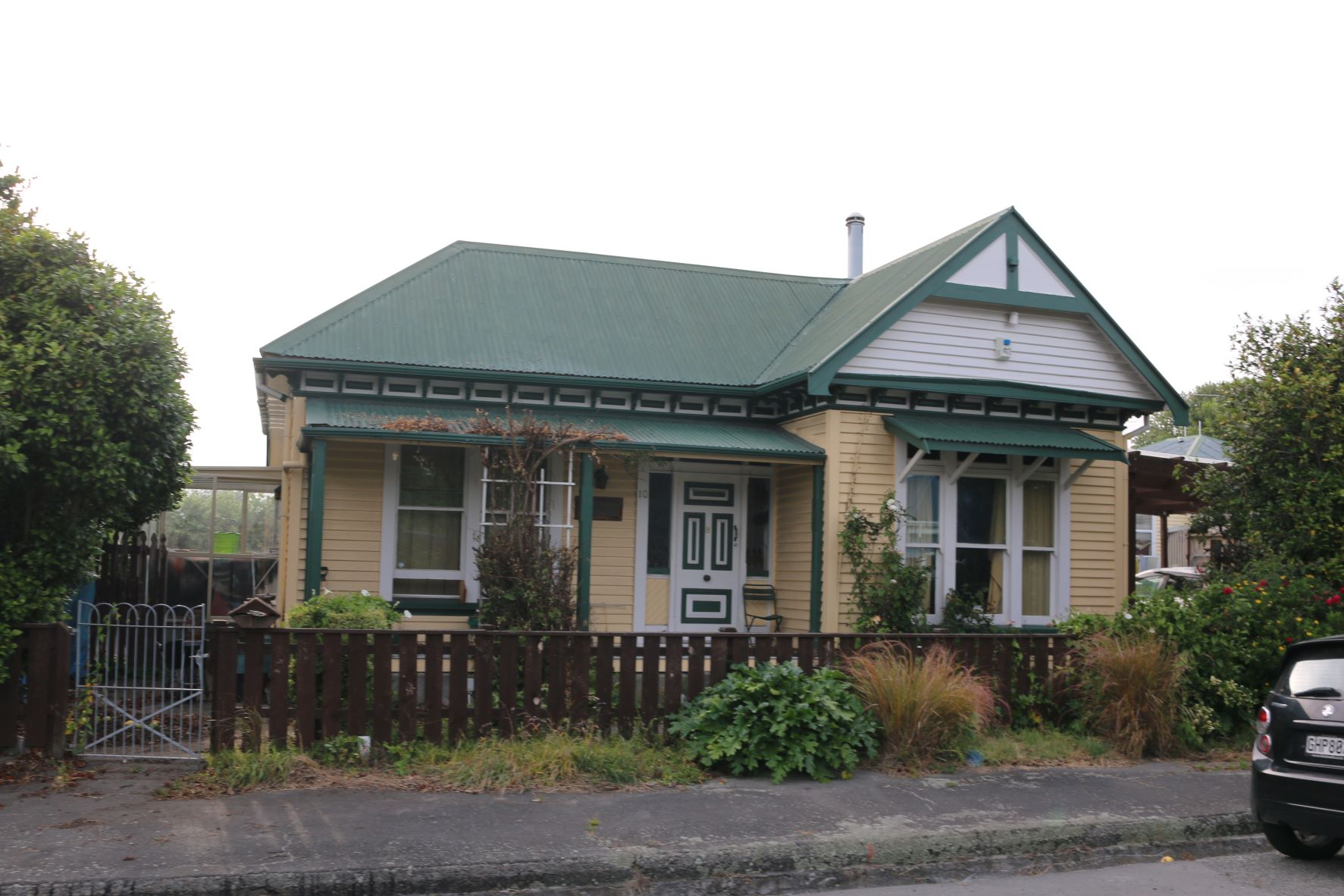

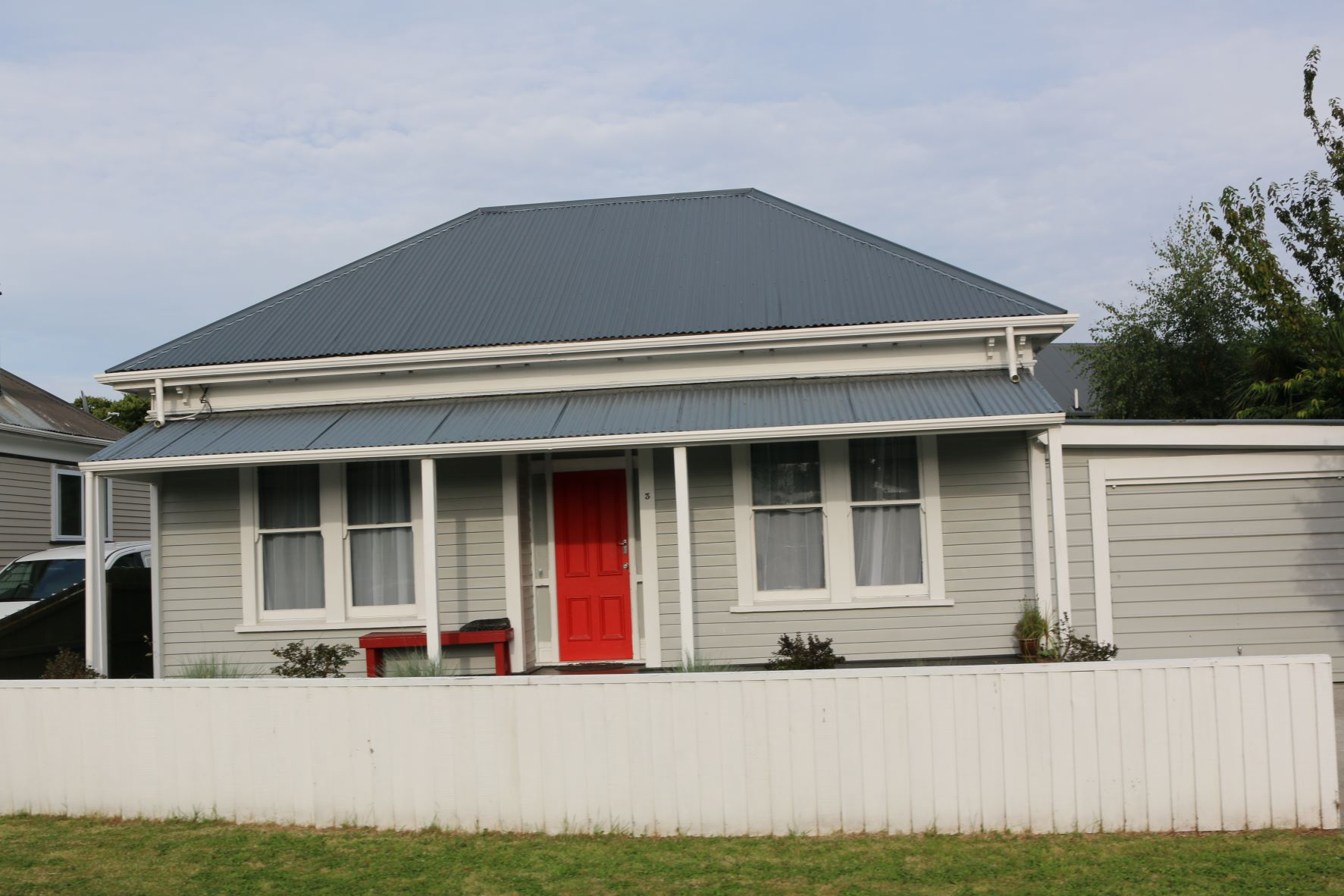

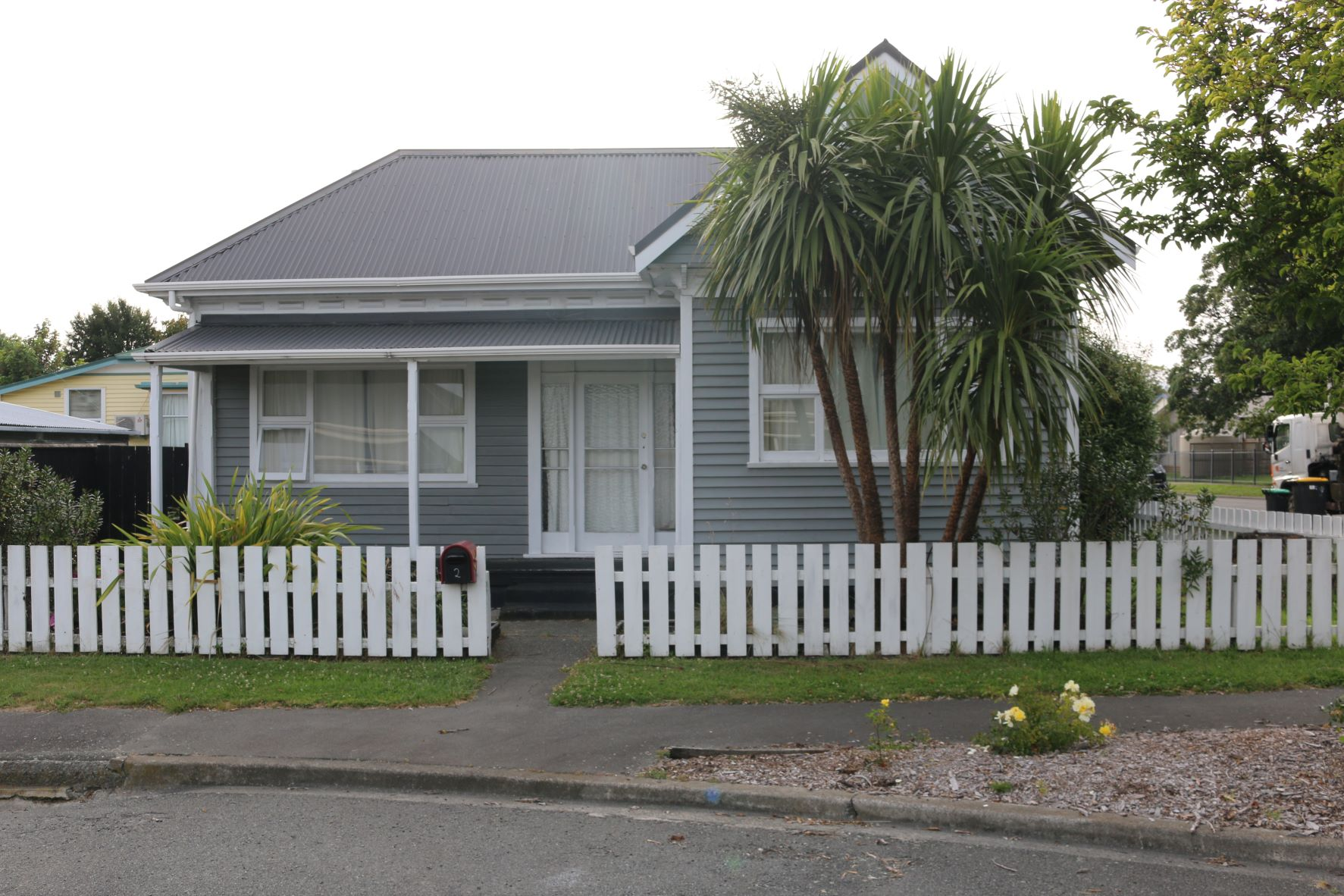

== Education ==
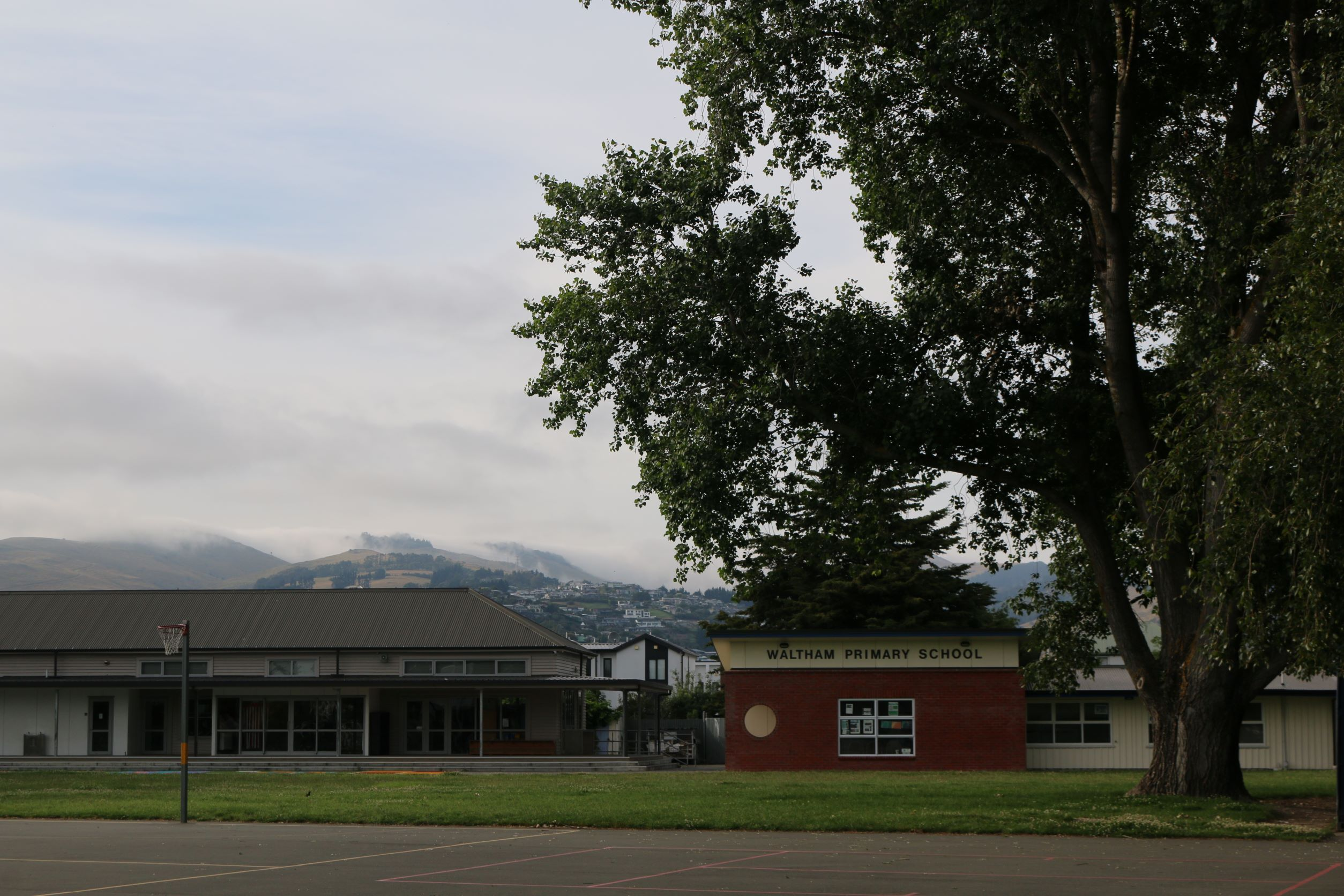
Waltham Primary School (2022)

Waltham School is a full primary school for years 1 to 8, with a roll of 256 students. The school opened in 1891.

Te Kura Kaupapa Māori o Waitaha is a composite school for years 1 to 13, teaching in the Māori language. It has a roll of 224 students. The school was established in 1987.

Both of these are coeducational state schools. Rolls are as of July 2026.

== Waltham summer pool ==
The Waltham swimming pools were badly damaged in the 2011 Christchurch earthquakes. The pools were reopened in January 2015 after repair work that was estimated to cost $3.2 million dollars. Repair work included upgraded signage, a re-sized plant room, fencing, painting, landscaping and roofing,

The outdoor pools are open over summer each year. The complex includes a nine lane 33 metre swimming pool, a toddler pool and a waterslide.
