= Hillsborough, Christchurch =

Suburb of Christchurch, New Zealand

Hillsborough
- Suburb
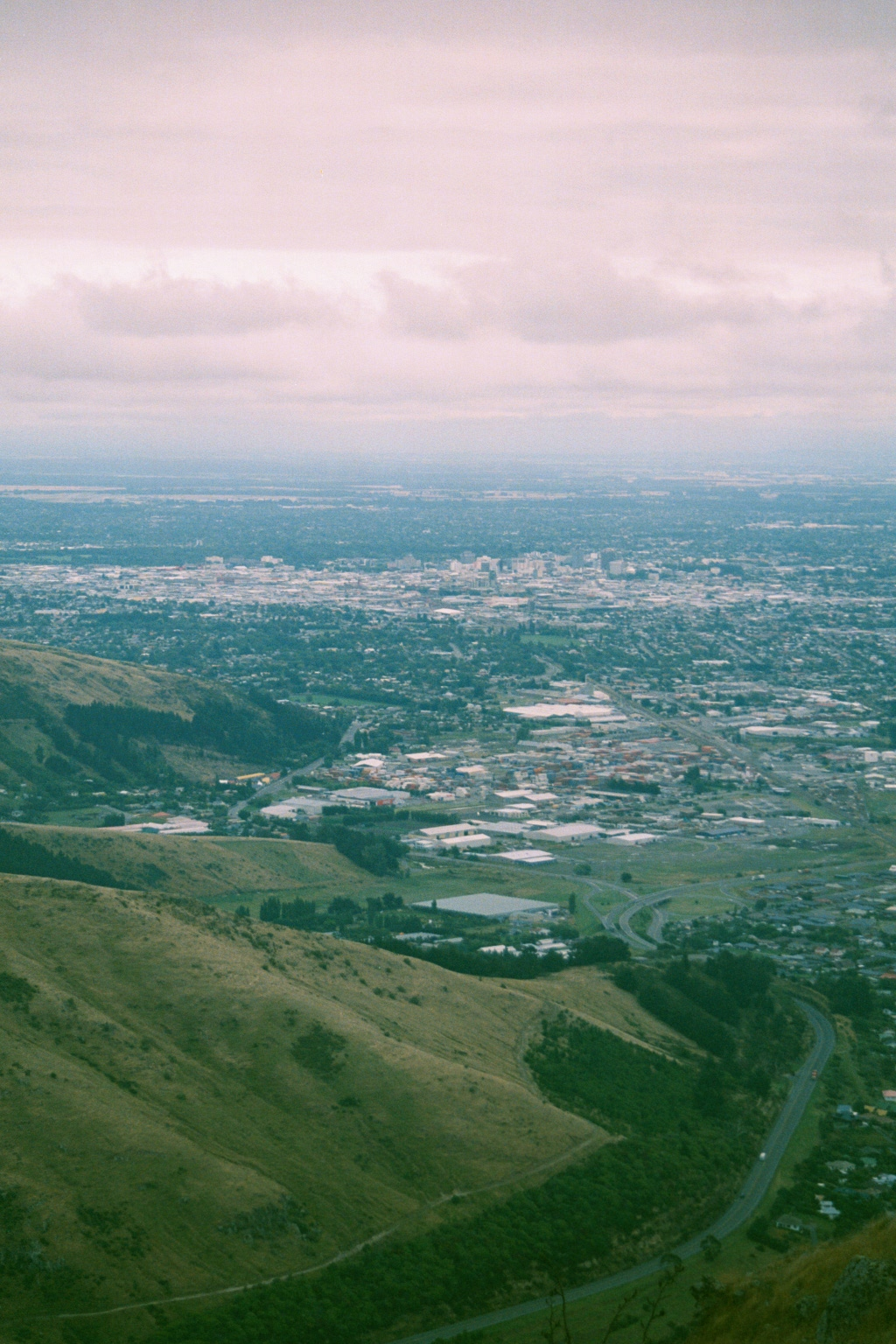
- Part of the industrial area of Hillsborough as viewed from the Port Hills
- Interactive map of Hillsborough
- Coordinates: 43°33′38″S 172°40′18″E
- Country: New Zealand
- City: Christchurch
- Local authority: Christchurch City Council
- Electoral ward: Heathcote; Cashmere
- Community board: Waihoro Spreydon-Cashmere-Heathcote

Area
  - Land: 164 ha (410 acres)

Population (June 2025)
  - Total: 2,430
  - Density: 1,480/km^{2} (3,840/sq mi)

St Martins	Opawa	Woolston
Huntsbury	Hillsborough	Ferrymead
	(Port Hills)	Heathcote Valley

Hillsborough is a mixed industrial and residential suburb of Christchurch, New Zealand, located approximately 4 kilometres (2.5 mi) to the south-east of the city centre.

The area was first owned by Edward Garland, who initially called it Broomfield Farm after settling the land with his wife Annie in 1854. Garland grazed cattle on the low-lying land south of the Ōpāwaho / Heathcote River, and sheep on the slopes of the Port Hills. It is unclear when the farm was given the name Hillsborough, however the name Broomfield eventually fell into disuse as the area developed. By the area's integration into greater Christchurch in 1945, the name Hillsborough was exclusively used. Despite this, the area's early history is still reflected in some street names, with a main thoroughfare of the suburb – Garlands Road – named for the Garland family and following the route of their original driveway.

The suburb's residential and industrial areas are largely divided, with much of the land around the base of the Port Hills in the suburb's south zoned industrial and residential areas further north, near the Ōpāwaho / Heathcote River. The area around the base of the hills has long been used for industrial purposes, and was formerly occupied by multiple brickworks.

== Demographics ==
Hillsborough, which includes Murray Aynsley Hill, covers 1.64 km^{2} (0.63 sq mi). It had an estimated population of 2,430 as of June 2025, with a population density of 2,314 people per km^{2}.

Historical population
Year	Pop.	±% p.a.
2006	2,532	—
2013	2,226	−1.82%
2018	2,370	+1.26%
2023	2,370	+0.00%

Hillsborough had a population of 2,370 in the 2023 New Zealand census, unchanged since the 2018 census, and an increase of 144 people (6.5%) since the 2013 census. There were 1,197 males, 1,164 females, and 12 people of other genders in 951 dwellings. 3.7% of people identified as LGBTIQ+. The median age was 42.2 years (compared with 38.1 years nationally). There were 399 people (16.8%) aged under 15 years, 381 (16.1%) aged 15 to 29, 1,176 (49.6%) aged 30 to 64, and 414 (17.5%) aged 65 or older.

People could identify as more than one ethnicity. The results were 91.3% European (Pākehā); 9.5% Māori; 3.3% Pasifika; 4.9% Asian; 1.8% Middle Eastern, Latin American and African New Zealanders (MELAA); and 2.3% other, which includes people giving their ethnicity as "New Zealander". English was spoken by 97.2%, Māori by 1.4%, Samoan by 0.9%, and other languages by 10.6%. No language could be spoken by 2.2% (e.g. too young to talk). New Zealand Sign Language was known by 0.9%. The percentage of people born overseas was 22.2, compared with 28.8% nationally.

Religious affiliations were 27.1% Christian, 0.3% Hindu, 0.1% Islam, 0.6% Buddhist, 0.5% New Age, 0.1% Jewish, and 1.9% other religions. People who answered that they had no religion were 61.9%, and 7.5% of people did not answer the census question.

Of those at least 15 years old, 717 (36.4%) people had a bachelor's or higher degree, 954 (48.4%) had a post-high school certificate or diploma, and 300 (15.2%) people exclusively held high school qualifications. The median income was $45,800, compared with $41,500 nationally. 282 people (14.3%) earned over $100,000 compared to 12.1% nationally. The employment status of those at least 15 was 1,023 (51.9%) full-time, 336 (17.0%) part-time, and 45 (2.3%) unemployed.
