= St Martins, New Zealand =

Suburb of Christchurch, New Zealand

St Martins
- Suburb
- Interactive map of St Martins
- Coordinates: 43.556479°S 172.652748°E
- Country: New Zealand
- City: Christchurch
- Local authority: Christchurch City Council
- Electoral ward: Cashmere
- Community board: Waihoro Spreydon-Cashmere-Heathcote

Area
  - Land: 105 ha (260 acres)

Population (June 2025)
  - Total: 2,890
  - Density: 2,750/km^{2} (7,130/sq mi)

Sydenham	Waltham
Beckenham	St Martins	Opawa
	Huntsbury	Hillsborough

St Martins is an inner suburb of Christchurch, New Zealand, located two kilometres south of the city centre.

Amenities include the Centaurus and Saint Martins Parks. St Martins is primarily a residential area, and contains a small shopping mall complex situated on Wilsons Road, the main thoroughfare through the suburb.

== Geography ==
Like most of Christchurch suburbs, St Martins does not have clearly defined boundaries. The Ōpāwaho / Heathcote River is often used as a boundary with Beckenham, Waltham and Opawa – St Martins is on the right bank, on the flat land between the river and the Port Hills.

Prior to European settlement, much of the suburb consisted of marshlands and swamplands which were heavily connected to the ecosystem of the Heathcote River. St Martin's proximity to the river and the original state of the land have caused the area to suffer damage in the 2010 and 2011 earthquakes which hit the region. In many areas of the city including St Martins, ground levels dropped by 20–30 centimetres (7.9–11.8 inches) making the already low-lying areas adjacent to the river more susceptible to flooding during periods of heavy rain.

== History ==
The land was purchased by Henry Phillips in the early days of European settlement and converted into an orchard, which Phillips held for himself and his family. It was Phillips who first named the area St Martins, although the exact origin of this is unclear. One likely contender is that it was named after Saint Martin's Hall in London, where a gathering of Canterbury pilgrims (who Phillips was associated with) was held immediately prior to their departure for Christchurch.

The orchard was first subdivided by Phillips in 1863 using the name St Martins, which appeared in official sources fifteen years later. As with many neighbouring suburbs, the area steadily grew throughout the late 19th and early 20th centuries, with amenities being developed through lobbying by locals. In 1923, a community group from St Martins led by a local bricklayer and trade unionist received support from Christchurch City Council to build a library as a compromise option from the group's original aim of a community hall. The library cost was officially opened in 1927 by mayor John Kendrick Archer, and by the end of that year had 273 subscribers. The library was eventually closed due to earthquake damage following the 2011 earthquake and several houses had been damaged by falling chimneys. Also, a supermarket was left irreparably damaged after the earthquakes and was subsequently demolished and rebuilt.

== Demographics ==
St Martins covers 1.05 km^{2} (0.41 sq mi). It had an estimated population of 2,890 as of June 2025, with a population density of 2,752 people per km^{2}.

Historical population
Year	Pop.	±% p.a.
2006	2,751	—
2013	2,652	−0.52%
2018	2,721	+0.52%
2023	2,805	+0.61%

St Martins had a population of 2,805 in the 2023 New Zealand census, an increase of 84 people (3.1%) since the 2018 census, and an increase of 153 people (5.8%) since the 2013 census. There were 1,296 males, 1,491 females, and 18 people of other genders in 1,161 dwellings. 3.4% of people identified as LGBTIQ+. The median age was 40.6 years (compared with 38.1 years nationally). There were 543 people (19.4%) aged under 15 years, 408 (14.5%) aged 15 to 29, 1,332 (47.5%) aged 30 to 64, and 522 (18.6%) aged 65 or older.

People could identify as more than one ethnicity. The results were 87.7% European (Pākehā); 9.7% Māori; 4.0% Pasifika; 6.2% Asian; 2.6% Middle Eastern, Latin American and African New Zealanders (MELAA); and 2.2% other, which includes people giving their ethnicity as "New Zealander". English was spoken by 97.4%, Māori by 1.8%, Samoan by 1.6%, and other languages by 10.5%. No language could be spoken by 1.9% (e.g. too young to talk). New Zealand Sign Language was known by 0.4%. The percentage of people born overseas was 23.3, compared with 28.8% nationally.

Religious affiliations were 29.6% Christian, 0.5% Hindu, 0.3% Islam, 0.5% Māori religious beliefs, 0.5% Buddhist, 0.7% New Age, and 1.7% other religions. People who answered that they had no religion were 59.7%, and 6.5% of people did not answer the census question.

Of those at least 15 years old, 795 (35.1%) people had a bachelor's or higher degree, 1,044 (46.2%) had a post-high school certificate or diploma, and 426 (18.8%) people exclusively held high school qualifications. The median income was $42,400, compared with $41,500 nationally. 324 people (14.3%) earned over $100,000 compared to 12.1% nationally. The employment status of those at least 15 was 1,086 (48.0%) full-time, 339 (15.0%) part-time, and 42 (1.9%) unemployed.

== Education ==
Saint Martins School is a full primary school, which provides education for years 1 to 8. It has a roll of 477 students. The school opened in 1956.

Hillview Christian School is a state-integrated school for years 1 to 10. It has a roll of 548 students. The school was established in 1977 as St Martin Private School by the Evangelistic Church (now C3 Church Christchurch), and was originally open only to children of members of that church.

Both schools are coeducational. Rolls are as of July 2026.
