= Cashmere, New Zealand =

Suburb of Christchurch, New Zealand

Cashmere
- Suburb
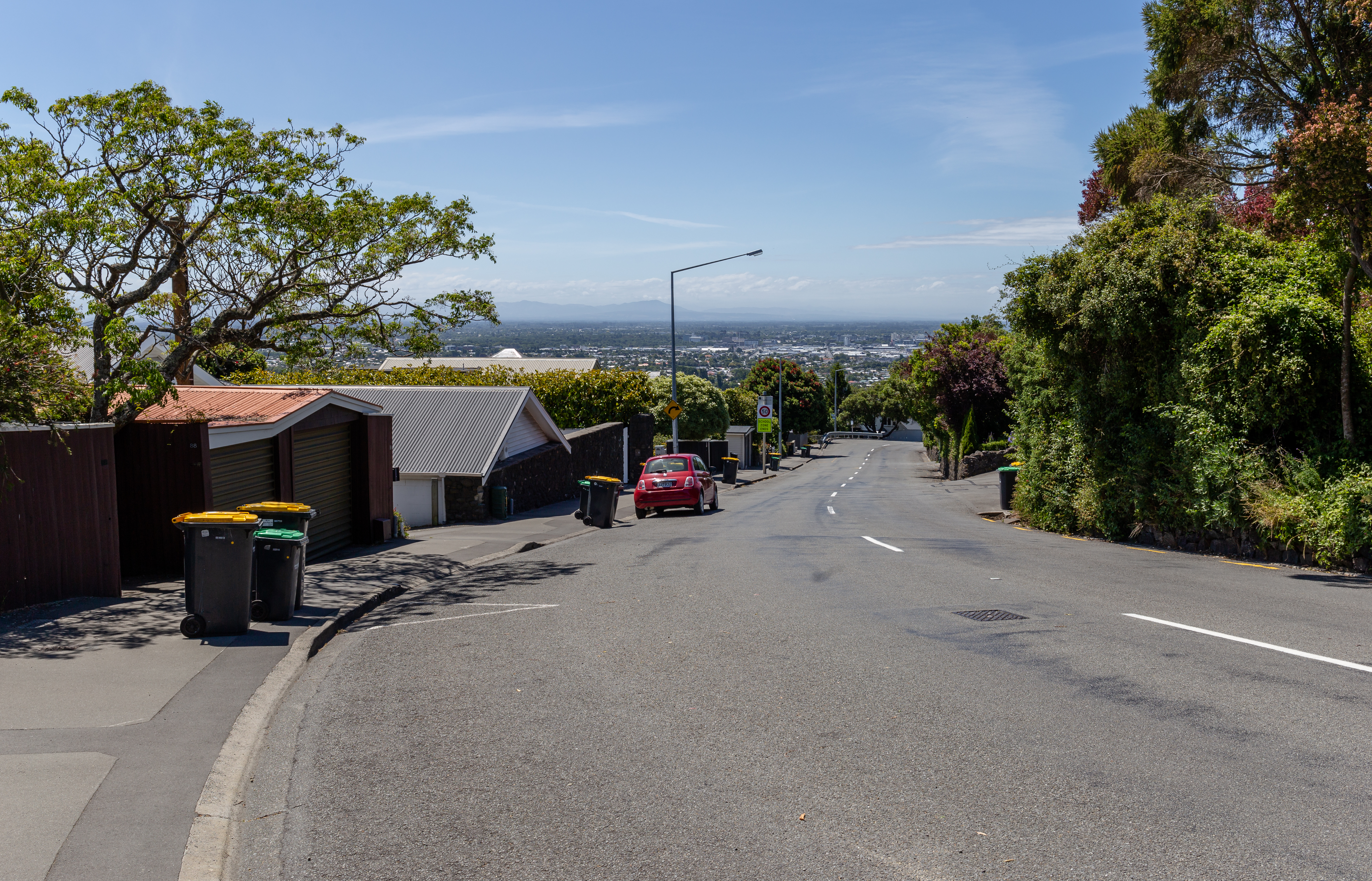
- Dyers Pass Road commanding views across Christchurch
- Interactive map of Cashmere
- Coordinates: 43.572751°S 172.631100°E
- Country: New Zealand
- City: Christchurch
- Local authority: Christchurch City Council
- Electoral ward: Cashmere
- Community board: Waihoro Spreydon-Cashmere-Heathcote

Area
  - Land: 471 ha (1,160 acres)

Population (June 2025)
  - Total: 6,900
  - Density: 1,500/km^{2} (3,800/sq mi)
- Hospitals: Princess Margaret Hospital

Hoon Hay	Somerfield	Beckenham
Cracroft	Cashmere	Huntsbury
	(Port Hills)

Cashmere (Māori: Te Iringa-o-Kahukura) is a suburb which rises above the southern end of the city of Christchurch in New Zealand's South Island, on the north side of the Port Hills. It covers an area of 4.71 km^{2} (1.82 sq mi) and has a population of 6,453 as at 2018.

Cashmere is prone to hill related hazards such as rock fall, cliff collapse and landslips.

== Geography ==
Cashmere is situated on the north side of the Port Hills, immediately above the southern terminus of Colombo Street and approximately five kilometres south of the city centre. The suburb's location on the Port Hills offers it a commanding view over the rest of the mostly flat city. Cashmere's proximity to the rest of the Port Hills has also made it a favourite for recreation, with the upper reaches of the suburb dominated by Victoria Park with its multiple bike and walking tracks and connections to further tracks running the length of the Port Hills. Above Victoria Park is Sugarloaf, a 496 metres (1,627 ft) peak which is the location of a 119 metres (390 ft) transmission tower used for local radio and TV stations. The Ōpāwaho / Heathcote River marks the northern extent of the suburb, flowing roughly along the base of the Port Hills. Cashmere is prone to hill related hazards such as rock fall, cliff collapse and landslips.

=== Canterbury earthquakes ===
Cashmere was hit hard by the 4 September 2010 Canterbury and 22 February 2011 Christchurch earthquakes. The fault rupture (a 'blind' fault) extended from Cashmere east-northeast to the estuary area. A GNS report on land instability indicated 36 areas of mass movement. The fault caused extensive damage due to rockfalls, land movement and cliff collapse. Following the quake, deep tension cracks and rents on slopes indicated areas with potential for further collapse. Rock fall included both cliff collapse and boulder roll, loess landsildes, retaining wall and fill failures. Hundreds of houses were damaged by rock fall, landslides and ground cracking.

== History ==
The Māori name for the area occupying modern-day Cashmere is Te Iringa-o-Kahukura. According to Māori mythology, the Māori name reflects a demigod who uplifted a wooden figure of Kahukura near the eastern edge of Dyers Pass who also recited a karakia.

Cashmere takes its name from Sir John Cracroft Wilson's farm in the area, which in turn was named after his birthplace of Kashmir (with Cashmere being the British spelling of that region at the time). Wilson briefly moved to Christchurch in 1854 from India by way of Australia, where he purchased 108 hectares of land to develop into Cashmere farm. Wilson built multiple farm buildings on the property, some of which persist to this day. In 1979, the house Wilson built for his Indian workers became a function centre known as "The Old Stone House". The building has been significantly damaged and restored twice, following a fire in 1971 and earthquakes in 2010 and 2011.

In the late 19th century, the area around Cashmere began to be settled by Europeans. Homes began to be built in Cashmere in the 1890s, although informal church services were being held as early as the 1880s. In response to the growth of this congregation, land from John Cracroft Wilson donated land for a church, which was completed in 1908 and marked the parish's formal split from neighbouring Sydenham. At roughly the same time, the Christchurch tramway system was extended to include the area, with the previous Cashmere line being extended from the southern end of Colombo street to the future site of the Sign of the Takahe. The tram line continued operation until 1954, with Cashmere gaining a reputation as one of the country's more well-to-do and refined suburbs in the process. This reputation continues to the present day, with the 2018 census showing that Cashmere has a significantly higher percentage of incomes over NZ$70,000 than the rest of Christchurch city.

== Demographics ==
Cashmere covers 4.71 km^{2} (1.82 sq mi). It had an estimated population of 6,900 as of June 2025, with a population density of 1,465 people per km^{2}.

Historical population
Year	Pop.	±% p.a.
2006	6,333	—
2013	6,138	−0.45%
2018	6,450	+1.00%
2023	6,714	+0.81%

Cashmere had a population of 6,714 in the 2023 New Zealand census, an increase of 264 people (4.1%) since the 2018 census, and an increase of 576 people (9.4%) since the 2013 census. There were 3,324 males, 3,351 females, and 42 people of other genders in 2,517 dwellings. 3.2% of people identified as LGBTIQ+. The median age was 44.3 years (compared with 38.1 years nationally). There were 1,290 people (19.2%) aged under 15 years, 930 (13.9%) aged 15 to 29, 3,207 (47.8%) aged 30 to 64, and 1,287 (19.2%) aged 65 or older.

People could identify as more than one ethnicity. The results were 91.6% European (Pākehā); 5.3% Māori; 1.1% Pasifika; 6.0% Asian; 1.3% Middle Eastern, Latin American and African New Zealanders (MELAA); and 2.7% other, which includes people giving their ethnicity as "New Zealander". English was spoken by 97.9%, Māori by 1.3%, Samoan by 0.2%, and other languages by 13.0%. No language could be spoken by 1.6% (e.g. too young to talk). New Zealand Sign Language was known by 0.4%. The percentage of people born overseas was 25.7, compared with 28.8% nationally.

Religious affiliations were 29.7% Christian, 0.5% Hindu, 0.5% Islam, 0.6% Buddhist, 0.4% New Age, 0.1% Jewish, and 1.3% other religions. People who answered that they had no religion were 61.7%, and 5.2% of people did not answer the census question.

Of those at least 15 years old, 2,595 (47.8%) people had a bachelor's or higher degree, 2,253 (41.5%) had a post-high school certificate or diploma, and 576 (10.6%) people exclusively held high school qualifications. The median income was $54,600, compared with $41,500 nationally. 1,386 people (25.6%) earned over $100,000 compared to 12.1% nationally. The employment status of those at least 15 was 2,685 (49.5%) full-time, 1,014 (18.7%) part-time, and 105 (1.9%) unemployed.

Individual statistical areas
Name	Area (km^{2})	Population	Density (per km^{2})	Dwellings	Median age	Median income
Cashmere West	2.38	3,165	1,330	1,203	45.4 years	$55,000
Cashmere East	2.33	3,549	1,523	1,314	43.5 years	$54,300
New Zealand					38.1 years	$41,500

== Buildings and infrastructure ==
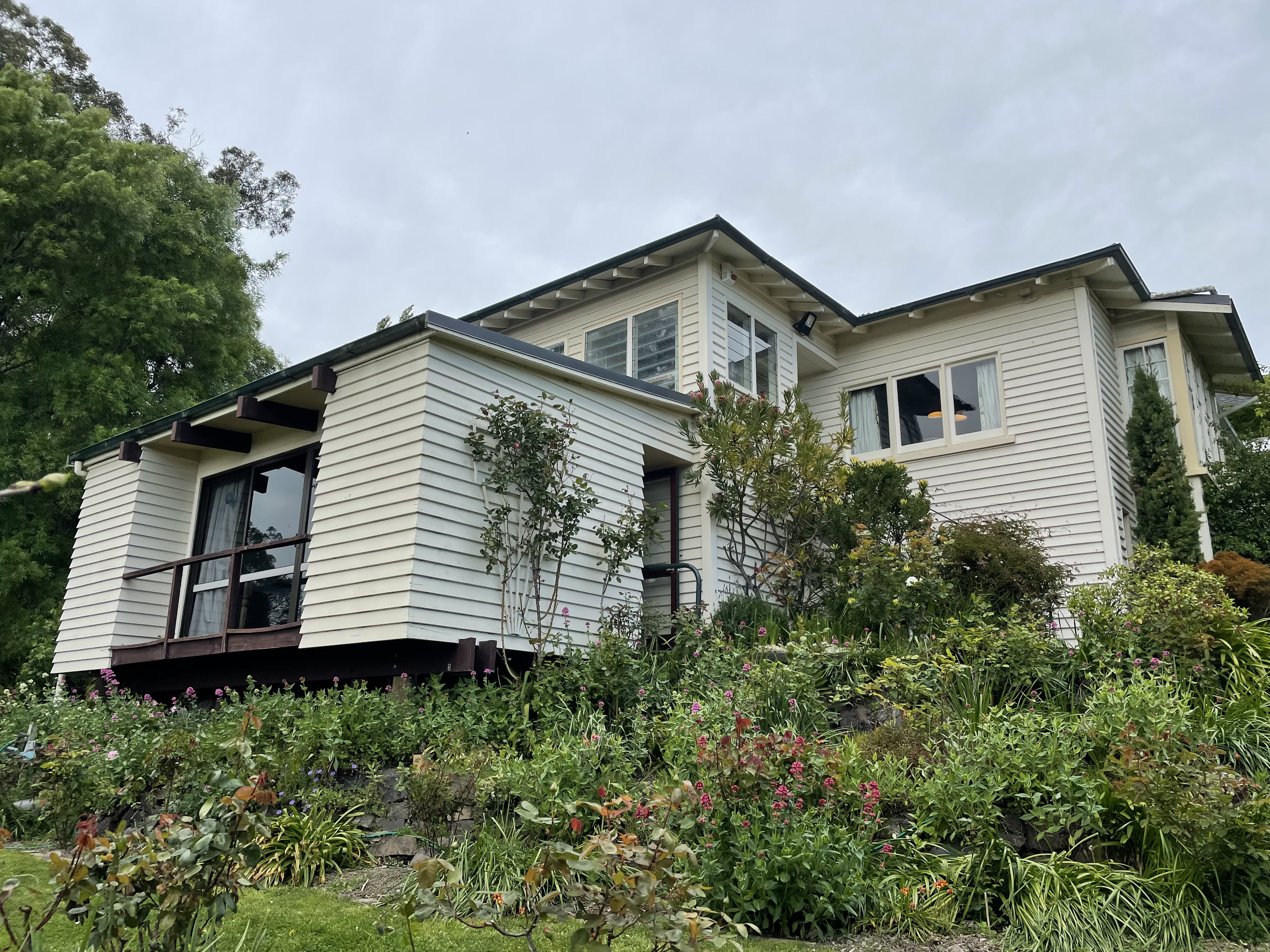
Dame Ngaio Marsh's Home

Two of Harry Ell's rest houses, the Sign of the Takahe and the Sign of the Kiwi, are located in Cashmere. Both are Category I heritage buildings. Dame Ngaio Marsh's former house in Valley Road is a museum run in her memory. It is registered by Heritage New Zealand as a Category I heritage item.

Princess Margaret Hospital, built in 1959, was once thought to become the main hospital of Christchurch, but it was too far from the central city.

The Cashmere Club is home to many local sports groups including rugby, soccer, bowls, badminton, darts, squash and small bore rifle shooting. The Canterbury Ring Laser facility is located in the Cracroft Caverns, an underground bunker complex built during World War II. Christchurch Adventure Park is a mountain bike park that opened in December 2016.

== Notable residents ==
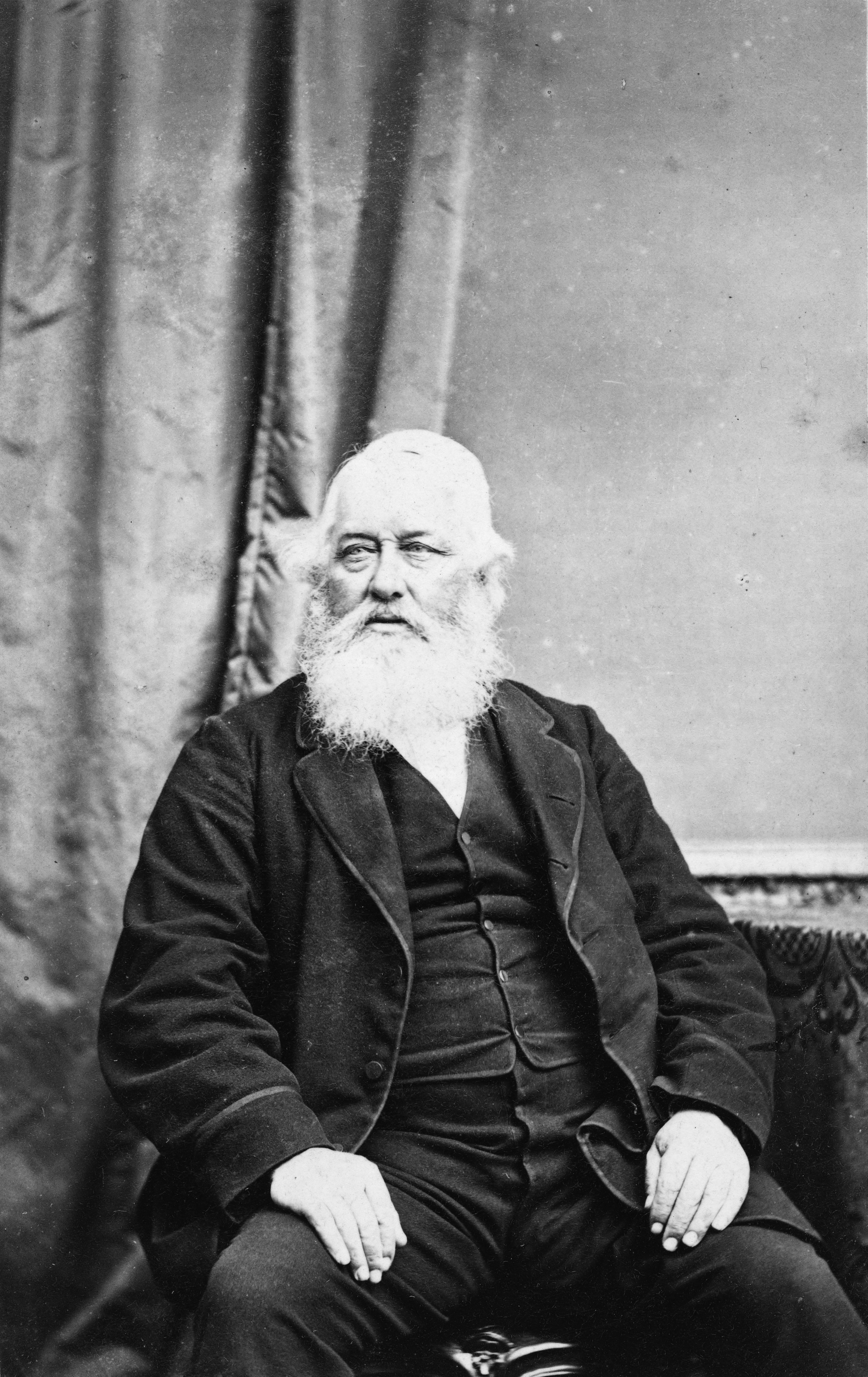
John Cracroft Wilson in 1878

- Ursula Bethell (1874–1945), poet
- Fanny B. Cole (1860–1913), national president of Women's Christian Temperance Union New Zealand
- Ruth Dyson (born 1957), politician
- Norman Hardie (born 1924), mountaineer
- Ngaio Marsh (1895–1982), world-renowned crime writer who lived in 37 Valley Road from 1907 until her death
- Sam Neill (1947–2026), actor and vintner
- T.E. "Tommy" Taylor (1862–1911), politician
- John Cracroft Wilson (1808–1881), Member of Parliament

== Education ==
Cashmere Primary Te Pae Kererū is a full primary school for years 1 to 8 with a roll of 488 students. It opened in 1900 as Port Hills Aided School and moved to the current site in 1905. The name changed to Cashmere School in 1907.

Te Kura o Huriawa Thorrington is a contributing primary school for years 1 to 6 with a roll of 441 students. It opened in 1958.

Both schools are coeducational. Rolls are as of July 2026.
