= Huntsbury =

Suburb of Christchurch, New Zealand

- Suburb
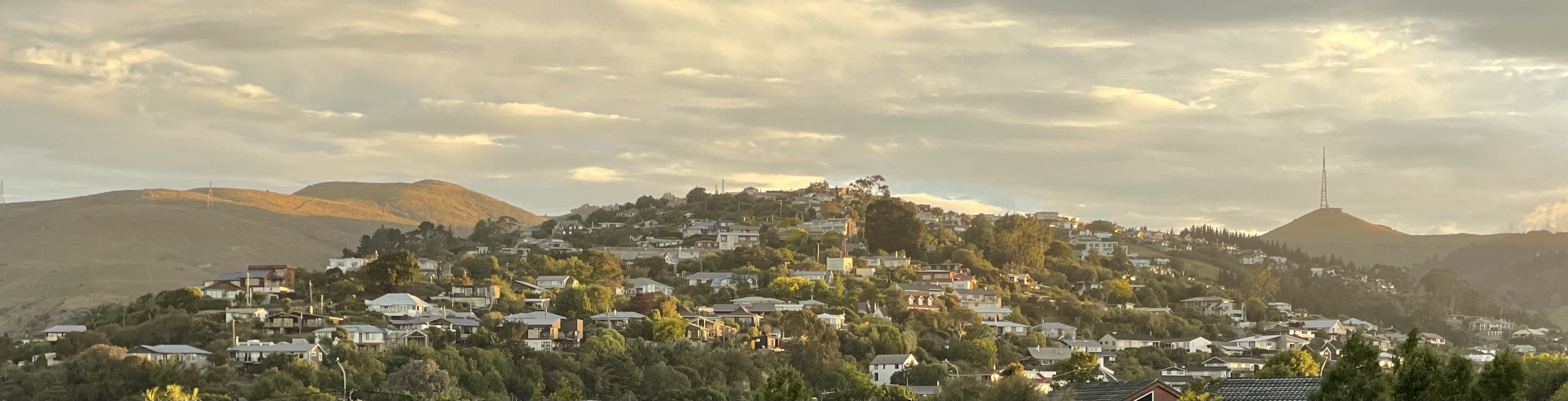
- Huntsbury viewed from neighbouring St Martins. Also shown are the landmarks of Mount Vernon on the left and Te Heru o Kahukura / Sugarloaf and its transmitter on the right.
- Interactive map of Huntsbury
- Coordinates: 43.570476°S 172.650773°E
- Country: New Zealand
- City: Christchurch
- Local authority: Christchurch City Council
- Electoral ward: Cashmere
- Community board: Waihoro Spreydon-Cashmere-Heathcote

Area
  - Land: 137 ha (340 acres)

Population (June 2025)
  - Total: 2,630
  - Density: 1,920/km^{2} (4,970/sq mi)

Beckenham	St Martins	Opawa
Cashmere	Huntsbury	Murray Aynsley Hill
	(Port Hills)

Huntsbury is a suburb of Christchurch, New Zealand, on the fringes of the Port Hills three kilometres south of the city centre. Huntsbury amalgamated with Christchurch City on 1 April 1941, on the same day as the New Brighton borough joined the city council.

== History ==
=== Cashmere Sanatorium ===
The Huntsbury hillside was originally the site of the Cashmere Sanatorium complex, a tuberculosis hospital which opened in 1914. At the time, best practice tuberculosis treatment consistent of "open air" living, so many patients in the complex lived in "huts", about 9 square metres with permanently open doors and windows, even in winter. After antibiotics largely eliminated tuberculosis, these huts were phased out from 1950, but one was restored by the city council and is found at the end of the private road Kimbolton Lane.

Other huts were built by returned servicemen as temporary homes while earning money to build permanent homes. These people were known as "hutters" or "hutties" and were the subject of complaints by other residents.

=== Residential development ===
The first sections were sold for housing on Huntsbury Hill in January 1920.

A water reservoir with capacity for 35,000 cubic metre was built in 1952.

Following the discharge of the final tuberculosis patient in the 1960s, the sanatorium complex became the site of Coronation Hospital, before it too closed in 1991. Construction company, Fulton Hogan, demolished the last of the complex to make way for the Broad Oaks subdivision.

=== 21st century ===
By 2011, the Huntsbury water reservoir was Christchurch's main drinking water storage facility. During the 2011 Christchurch earthquake a previously unknown shear zone beneath the facility ruptured. The basin was shattered and water drained into the cracked hills, while the pump station was extensively damaged. Following the quake a new pump station was commissioned, and the reservoir was replaced with two structures on either side of the shear zone, designed to move independently in future quakes.

The 2011 earthquake also had a marked effect on the suburb's houses. By 2020, many houses had been repaired but many other sites remained empty following demolitions, and retaining walls broken.

== Demographics ==
Huntsbury covers 1.37 km^{2} (0.53 sq mi). It had an estimated population of 2,630 as of June 2025, with a population density of 1,920 people per km^{2}.

Historical population
Year	Pop.	±% p.a.
2006	2,121	—
2013	2,028	−0.64%
2018	2,268	+2.26%
2023	2,541	+2.30%

Huntsbury had a population of 2,541 in the 2023 New Zealand census, an increase of 273 people (12.0%) since the 2018 census, and an increase of 513 people (25.3%) since the 2013 census. There were 1,278 males, 1,245 females, and 18 people of other genders in 954 dwellings. 4.0% of people identified as LGBTIQ+. The median age was 46.2 years (compared with 38.1 years nationally). There were 396 people (15.6%) aged under 15 years, 384 (15.1%) aged 15 to 29, 1,302 (51.2%) aged 30 to 64, and 459 (18.1%) aged 65 or older.

People could identify as more than one ethnicity. The results were 93.9% European (Pākehā); 6.6% Māori; 0.7% Pasifika; 5.5% Asian; 0.9% Middle Eastern, Latin American and African New Zealanders (MELAA); and 1.8% other, which includes people giving their ethnicity as "New Zealander". English was spoken by 98.0%, Māori by 1.9%, and other languages by 12.8%. No language could be spoken by 1.5% (e.g. too young to talk). New Zealand Sign Language was known by 0.6%. The percentage of people born overseas was 23.6, compared with 28.8% nationally.

Religious affiliations were 24.9% Christian, 0.6% Hindu, 0.2% Māori religious beliefs, 0.6% Buddhist, 0.2% New Age, 0.2% Jewish, and 0.9% other religions. People who answered that they had no religion were 67.5%, and 5.0% of people did not answer the census question.

Of those at least 15 years old, 960 (44.8%) people had a bachelor's or higher degree, 957 (44.6%) had a post-high school certificate or diploma, and 228 (10.6%) people exclusively held high school qualifications. The median income was $57,900, compared with $41,500 nationally. 525 people (24.5%) earned over $100,000 compared to 12.1% nationally. The employment status of those at least 15 was 1,143 (53.3%) full-time, 378 (17.6%) part-time, and 30 (1.4%) unemployed.

== Features ==
Huntsbury Community Centre was fundraised in the early 1970s and opened in 1975. The centre is sited across the street from the water reservoir.

Huntsbury is host to one of four fountains scattered over Christchurch. Huntsbury's fountain is at the top of Conifer Place.

== Sources ==
- Christchurch City Libraries (2017). "The Hill of Hope – Cashmere Sanatorium". Christchurch City Libraries. Christchurch.
