= Ōpāwaho / Heathcote River =

River in Christchurch, New Zealand

Coordinates: 43.557700°S 172.708700°E

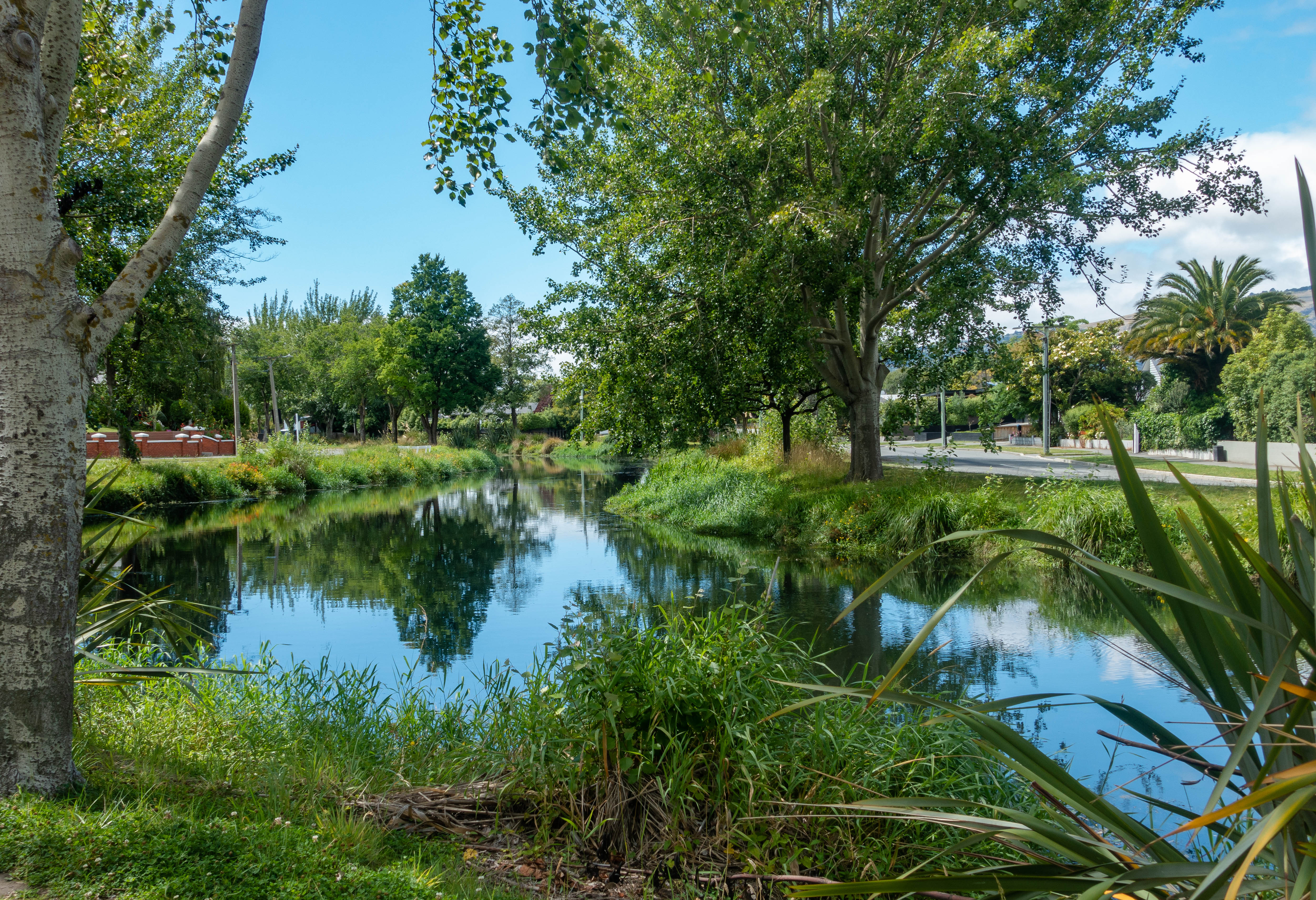
- Ōpāwaho / Heathcote River in Woolston
- Native name: Ōpāwaho (Māori)

Location
- Country: New Zealand

Physical characteristics
- Mouth
  - location: Pegasus Bay via the Avon Heathcote Estuary
  - elevation: 0 m (0 ft)

The Ōpāwaho / Heathcote River is located within the city boundaries of Christchurch, New Zealand. It is primarily fed by springs near Templeton Road, with its catchment area extending westward to Yaldhurst and Pound Road during wet weather. The river meanders around the base of the Port Hills, flowing from west to south-east.

== Course ==
The catchment of the Ōpāwaho / Heathcote River extends to the suburb of Yaldhurst. It drains an area of approximately 100 square kilometres (39 sq mi), with the Cashmere Stream the largest tributary. Curletts Stream flows through an industrial part of Christchurch before joining Ōpāwaho. The Heathcote River flows through Wigram, Hillmorton (where the main springs are located), Hoon Hay (and from there around the base of the Port Hills), Spreydon, Cracroft, Cashmere, Beckenham, St. Martins, Opawa, Woolston and Ferrymead.

It drains into the Avon Heathcote Estuary / Ihutai before draining into Pegasus Bay.

== Pre-European settlement and naming ==
The original Māori name for the river, Ō-pā-waho, means 'The Place of the Outward Pā' or 'The Outpost'. This refers to a pā (fortified settlement) that served as an outpost (Māori: waho) to Kaiapoi Pā

This pā was strategically built on higher ground, just downstream from the present-day Opawa Road Bridge. It functioned as an important resting place for Ngāi Tahu people travelling between Kaiapoi Pā and Te Pātaka o Rākaihautū (Banks Peninsula). The surrounding area was also a vital mahinga kai—a bountiful source of food, notably including tuere (blind eel) and kanakana (lamprey)

The river historically meandered through extensive wetlands prior to urbanisation. Historic survey maps from the mid-19th century (known as the 'Black Maps') indicate that the habitat that the river passed through was abundant in flax (harakeke), toetoe, raupō, tutu and ferns and was dotted with tī kōuka (cabbage tree).

The river corridor was low-lying and very wet. When the Waimakariri River rose and flowed across the plains, even higher ground was prone to flooding. Over many centuries of using the river as a food source and transport corridor, the iwi of Waitaha, Kāti Māmoe and Ngāi Tahu fostered a close relationship with this resource. The swamp forest around the river provided gathering grounds for water fowl and forest birds. Traps were regularly set for inanga (whitebait), pātiki (flounder), and tuna (eel).

The original European name for the river, the Heathcote, is in honour of Sir William Heathcote, secretary of the Canterbury Association.

== Management ==
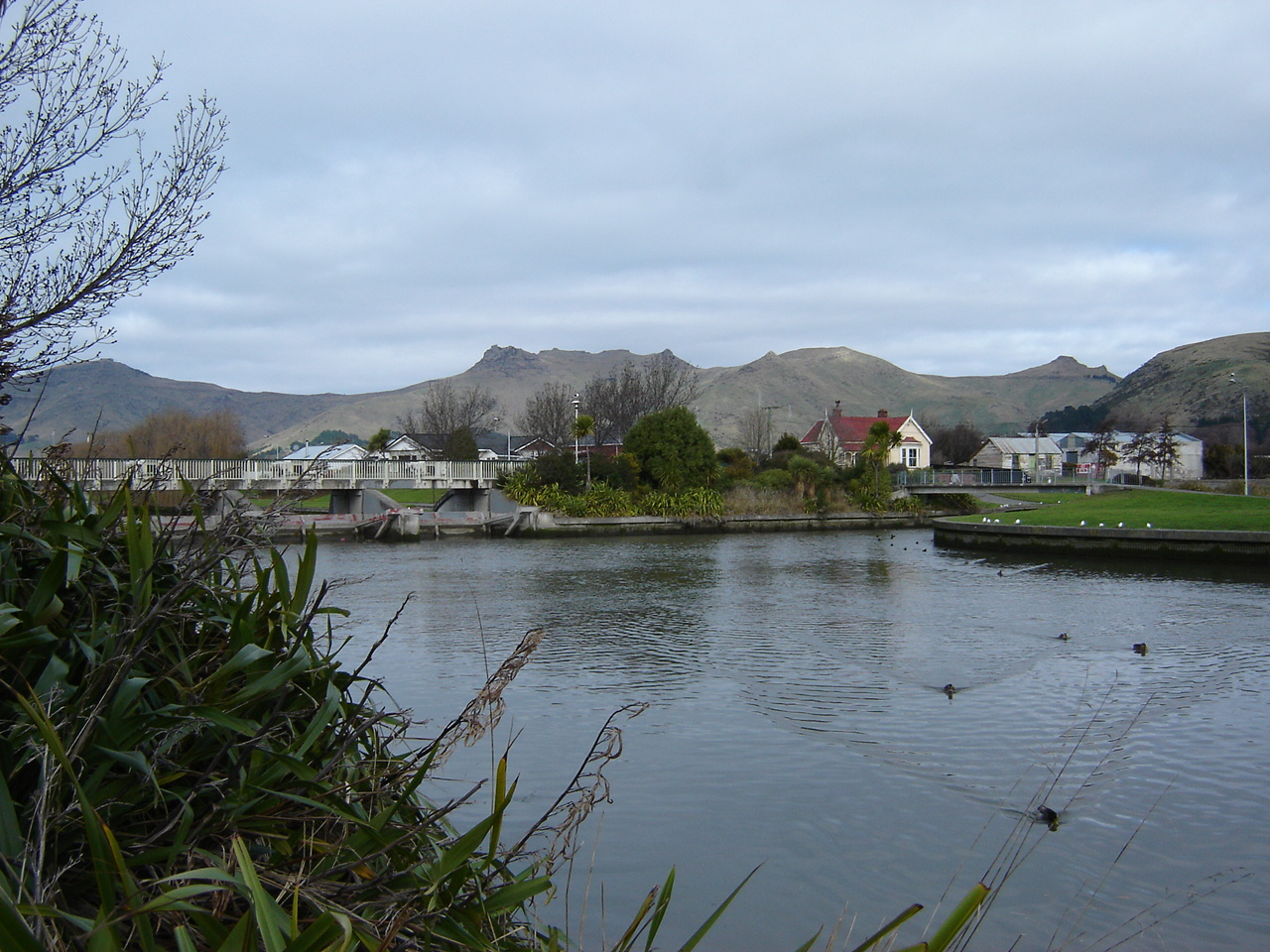
The Woolston Tidal Barrage and the Woolston Cut

The Ōpāwaho / Heathcote River provided Woolston with plentiful water for industries such as wool scouring. The river became increasingly polluted until the Woolston industrial sewer was built in 1966.

Flooding was also a problem until 1986 when the Woolston Cut began to allow flood waters to bypass a long loop of the river, known as the Woolston Loop. The 510-metre (1,670 ft) long project, which cost NZ$2m, had as a consequence that the trees on the riverbank died as far upstream as the Opawa bridge, and that banks collapsed. Extensive investigations revealed that the trees died from salt water travelling further upstream with every tide (with the salt killing the trees), that the soil structure changed (a sodium and calcium exchange in the clay molecules weakened the soils) and the tunnelling mud crab had extended its range up the river, further weakening the banks. As a mitigating measure, the Woolston Tidal Barrage was built at the upstream end of the cut, which is only opened in time of floods. During normal flow regimes, the Heathcote flows through the Woolston Loop. But despite the Woolston Cut, parts of the Ōpāwaho / Heathcote River have flooded during heavy rainfall.

During 2008, Christchurch City Council consulted on a management plan for the section of river located between Colombo Street and Opawa Road, which was formally adopted on 9 April 2009.

The water quality in the Ōpāwaho / Heathcote River is rated poorly by the Christchurch City Council in 2020. Eight of the thirteen worst monitored sites in rivers or streams in Christchurch were in the Ōpāwaho / Heathcote catchment.

Work has been completed in 2021 on stormwater basins at the upper Heathcote to improve the water quality, manage flood risk with an added benefit of providing additional recreational spaces. These include the Curletts stormwater basin and the, Wigram east basin. Work continues on the Eastman wetlands storage basins, Sutherlands storm water treatment basins and the flood storage basin in Worsleys valley near the Christchurch Adventure Park.

In the heavy rain which caused flooding across Canterbury at the end of May 2021, the Ōpāwaho / Heathcote River did not flood any houses above floor level. This was despite 127 mm (5.0 in) of rain falling over a three-day period. The Christchurch City Council was pleased to see the work developing storm water basins had paid off.

== Sources ==
- Blain, Rev. Michael (2007). The Canterbury Association (1848–1852): A Study of Its Members' Connections (PDF). Christchurch: Project Canterbury.
- Heathcote River Floodplain Management Strategy (PDF). Canterbury Regional Council, Christchurch City Council. November 1998. ISBN 1-86937-357-X. Archived from the original (PDF) on 24 January 2015.
- Mid-Heathcote River/Ōpawaho Linear Park Masterplan (PDF). Christchurch, New Zealand: Christchurch City Council. 2009.
- "Mid-Heathcote River/Ōpawaho Linear Park Masterplan – Part Two: Background" (PDF). Archived from the original (PDF) on 3 March 2016.
- "Mid-Heathcote River/Ōpawaho Linear Park Masterplan – Part Three: Key Goals" (PDF). Archived from the original (PDF) on 15 January 2015.
