= Murray Aynsley Hill =

- Location within Christchurch, New Zealand
- Coordinates: 43.564676°S 172.663929°E

Area
  - Total: 0.17 km^{2} (0.066 sq mi)

Population (2023)
  - Total: 180
  - Density: 1,100/km^{2} (2,700/sq mi)

Murray Aynsley Hill is a hillside suburb of Christchurch, New Zealand, located on the fringes of the Port Hills 5 kilometres (3.1 mi) south-east of the city centre. Situated above the suburb was Glenelg Children's Health Camp; the school for children with behavioural problems was closed by the Minister of Education, Anne Tolley, in January 2012. The suburb is named after early Christchurch settler Hugh Murray-Aynsley. The first owner of the land was Colonel Alexander Lean.

== Demographics ==
Murray Aynsley covers 0.17 km^{2} (0.066 sq mi). It is part of the larger statistical area of Hillsborough.

Historical population
Year	Pop.	±% p.a.
2006	213	—
2013	147	−5.16%
2018	156	+1.20%
2023	180	+2.90%

Murray Aynsley had a population of 180 in the 2023 New Zealand census, an increase of 24 people (15.4%) since the 2018 census, and an increase of 33 people (22.4%) since the 2013 census. There were 99 males, 78 females, and 3 people of other genders in 72 dwellings. 5.0% of people identified as LGBTIQ+. The median age was 47.9 years (compared with 38.1 years nationally). There were 27 people (15.0%) aged under 15 years, 30 (16.7%) aged 15 to 29, 90 (50.0%) aged 30 to 64, and 33 (18.3%) aged 65 or older.

People could identify as more than one ethnicity. The results were 96.7% European (Pākehā), 6.7% Māori, and 5.0% Asian. English was spoken by 100.0%, and other languages by 8.3%. New Zealand Sign Language was known by 1.7%. The percentage of people born overseas was 15.0, compared with 28.8% nationally.

Religious affiliations were 28.3% Christian, and 1.7% other religions. People who answered that they had no religion were 65.0%, and 5.0% of people did not answer the census question.

Of those at least 15 years old, 72 (47.1%) people had a bachelor's or higher degree, 72 (47.1%) had a post-high school certificate or diploma, and 15 (9.8%) people exclusively held high school qualifications. The median income was $51,200, compared with $41,500 nationally. 33 people (21.6%) earned over $100,000 compared to 12.1% nationally. The employment status of those at least 15 was 81 (52.9%) full-time, 24 (15.7%) part-time, and 6 (3.9%) unemployed.
