= Beckenham, New Zealand =

Suburb of Christchurch, New Zealand

Beckenham
- Suburb
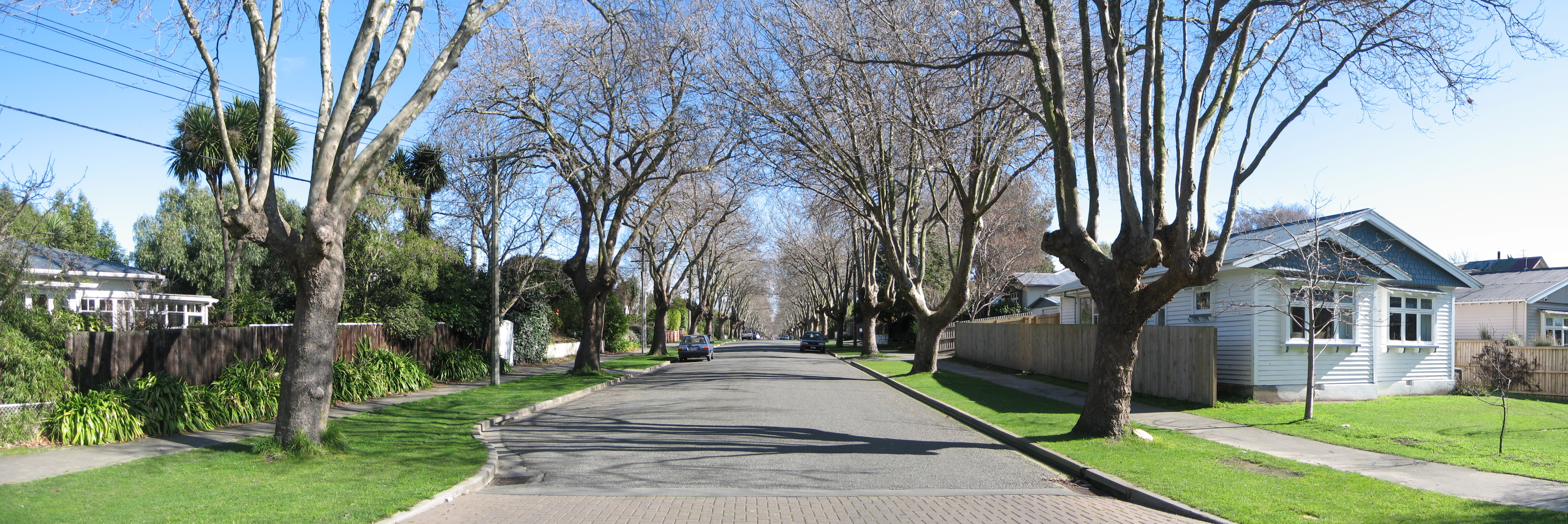
- Fisher Avenue, Beckenham
- Interactive map of Beckenham
- Coordinates: 43°33′48″S 172°38′37″E
- Country: New Zealand
- City: Christchurch
- Local authority: Christchurch City Council
- Electoral ward: Cashmere
- Community board: Waihoro Spreydon-Cashmere-Heathcote

Area
  - Land: 88 ha (220 acres)

Population (June 2025)
  - Total: 2,430
  - Density: 2,800/km^{2} (7,200/sq mi)

	Sydenham	St Martins
Somerfield	Beckenham
	Cashmere	Huntsbury

Beckenham is an inner suburb of Christchurch, New Zealand, located three kilometres south of the city centre. The Heathcote River winds through this predominantly residential suburb, a section of which is often referred to locally as the "Beckenham Loop". Beckenham is bounded by Sydenham to the north, Somerfield to the west, Cashmere and Huntsbury to the south and St Martins to the east.

== History ==
European settlement of Beckenham dates back 1850. James Temple Fisher was gifted Rural Section 21, a land block in the southern part of the Beckenham loop by his father-in-law, John Hooper, which he farmed following his arrival in 1850 on Charlotte Jane with his wife Harriet. His block was known as Fisher Estate or alternatively Fisherton. Stephen Fisher, James' brother, also arrived in 1850 and bought Rural Section 49, which he named Beckenham after his home town. Stephen also owned a block on Dyers Pass Road. The brothers and their family farmed the area until their deaths, at which point demand for residential land in Christchurch was growing. The farms were subdivided in 1906, forming the new suburbs of Beckenham and Fisherton in the process. The suburb grew in size as the Christchurch tramway system expanded into the area, down Colombo Street to Devon Street (1880), then Tennyson Street and finally to the Port Hills (1898), providing easy access from the suburb to the central city. During this process, the name Fisherton gradually fell into disuse, with the name Beckenham being applied to the whole area. Electricity was provided to Beckenham in 1912 and a waste water scheme was provided in the 1920s.

== Amenities ==
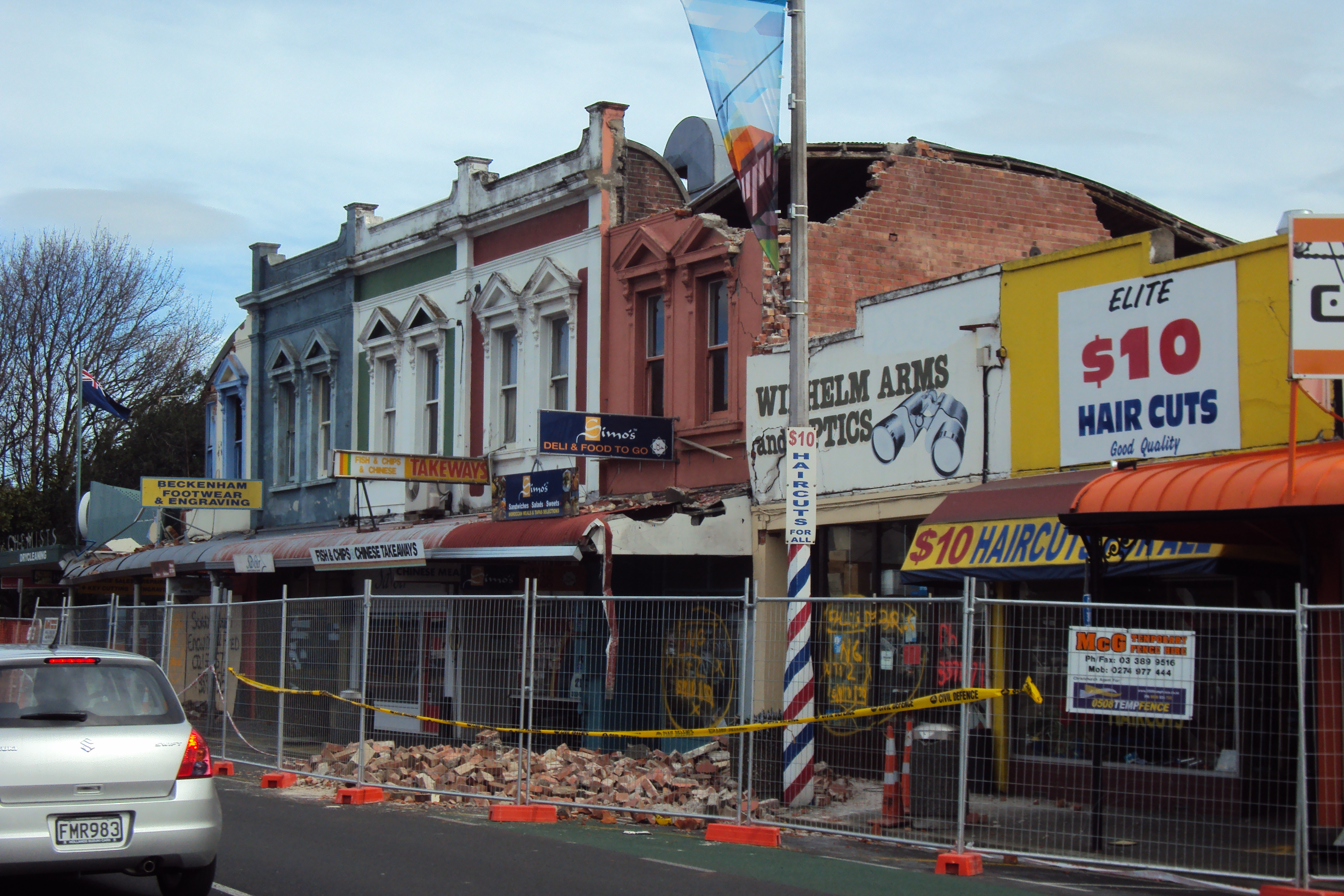
The Beckenham shops, which were demolished after the 2011 Canterbury earthquakes

The Beckenham shopping area on Colombo St, had a number of buildings demolished as a result of the 2010–11 earthquakes, but overall the area continues to thrive, with a butcher, café, pharmacy and post shop, among other businesses. The Christchurch South Police Station is located on Colombo Street.

Beckenham is home to the Beckenham Methodist Church, Beckenham Baptist Church and St Peters Beckenham Catholic Church.

Beckenham Park has duck ponds, is the home to the Southern Districts Cricket Club and the Beckenham Tennis Club. The Opawa-Saint Martins Toy Library is located in the former Beckenham Library on Sandwich Road.

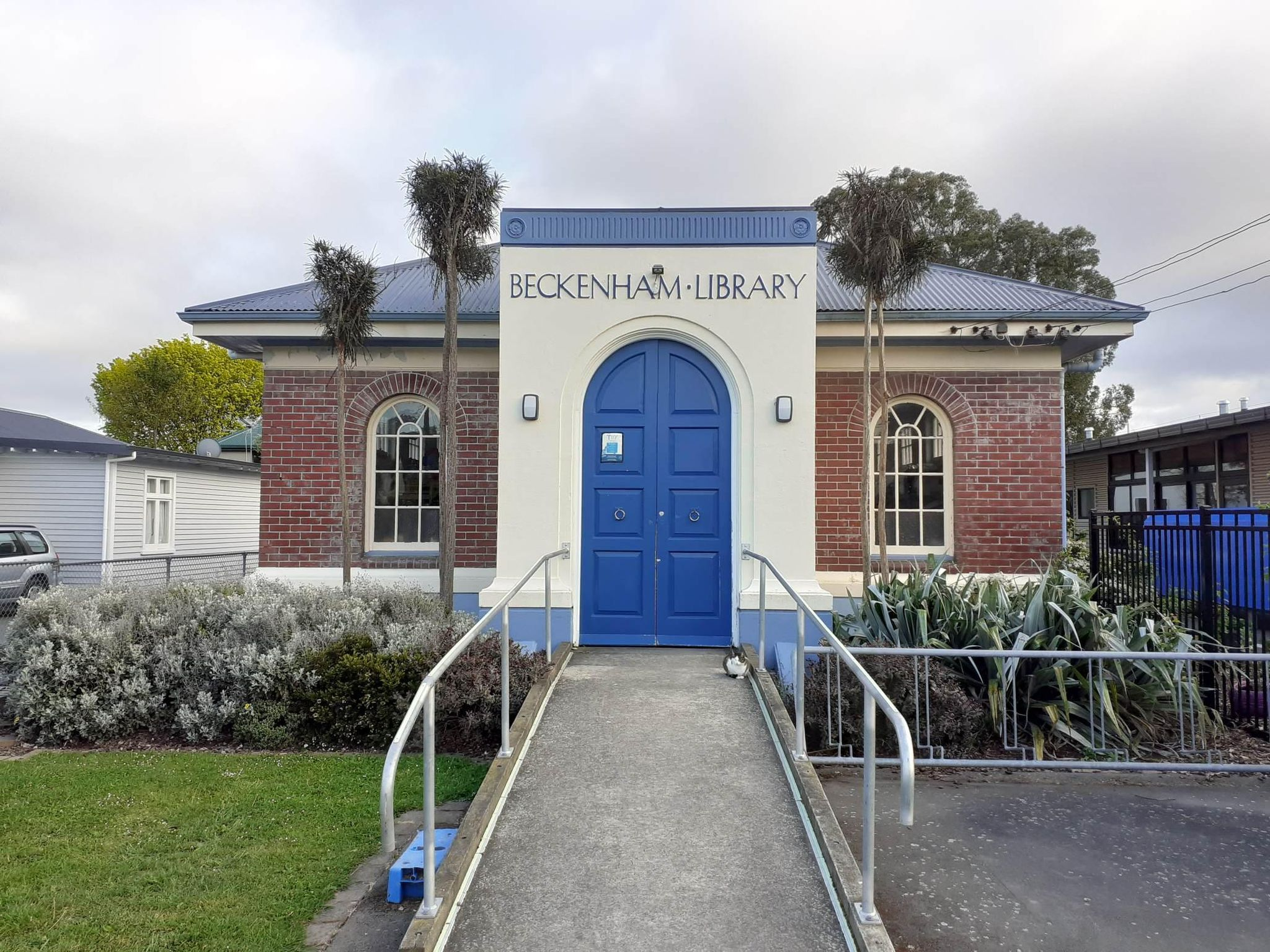
The former Beckenham library building, now home to the toy library (November 2020)

== Houses ==
There are many original houses built in the 1900s–1950s consisting of single- and the occasional two-storey villas, some brick single-storey dwellings, wooden bungalows, and a few Art Deco houses. There are a number of larger houses on Fisher Avenue. Many houses throughout the suburb have well established front gardens. The streets are relatively wide, with many mature street trees, including London planes. Some subdivision has occurred with new houses located behind the original houses with separate driveways and associated fencing. The trees on Fisher Avenue and Norwood Street contribute to Beckenham by creating a pleasant street appearance.

== Flooding issues ==
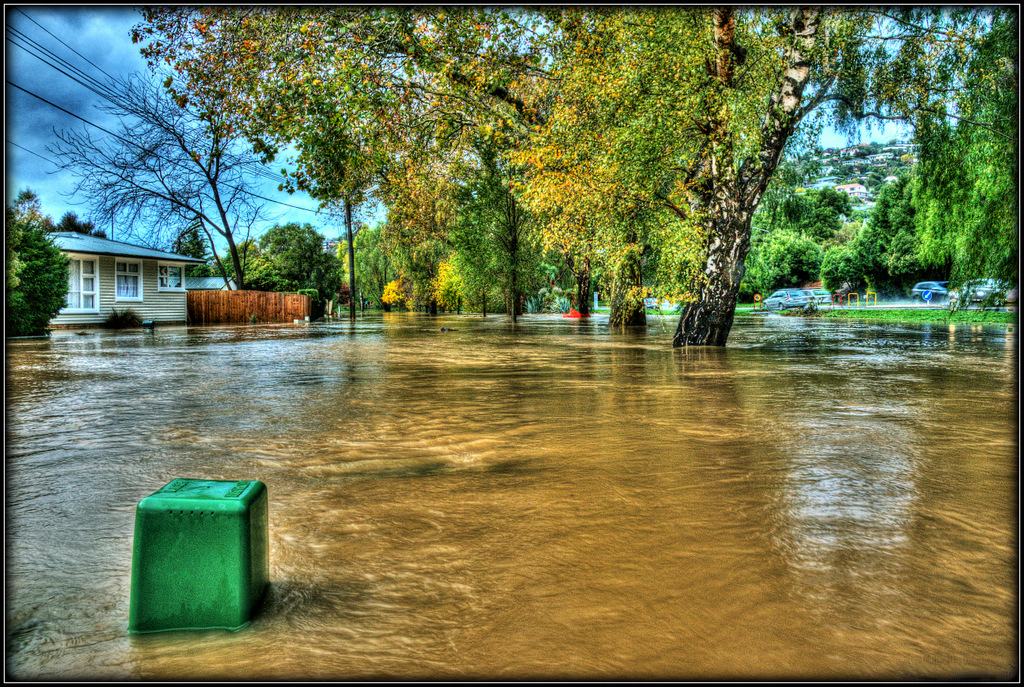
The Heathcote river in flood spilling into Eastern Terrace, Beckenham

Beckenham's location on the banks of the Ōpāwaho / Heathcote River means that streets along the river are prone to flooding during heavy rain events, like many suburbs in the lower reaches of the Ōpāwaho. The Christchurch City Council continues to implement flood mitigation strategies to lessen the impact of this.

== Demographics ==
Beckenham covers 0.88 km^{2} (0.34 sq mi). It had an estimated population of 2,430 as of June 2025, with a population density of 2,761 people per km^{2}.

Historical population
Year	Pop.	±% p.a.
2006	2,451	—
2013	2,442	−0.05%
2018	2,403	−0.32%
2023	2,367	−0.30%

Beckenham had a population of 2,367 in the 2023 New Zealand census, a decrease of 36 people (−1.5%) since the 2018 census, and a decrease of 75 people (−3.1%) since the 2013 census. There were 1,110 males, 1,248 females, and 9 people of other genders in 903 dwellings. 3.0% of people identified as LGBTIQ+. The median age was 42.7 years (compared with 38.1 years nationally). There were 477 people (20.2%) aged under 15 years, 345 (14.6%) aged 15 to 29, 1,125 (47.5%) aged 30 to 64, and 420 (17.7%) aged 65 or older.

People could identify as more than one ethnicity. The results were 93.3% European (Pākehā); 8.2% Māori; 0.8% Pasifika; 3.2% Asian; 2.3% Middle Eastern, Latin American and African New Zealanders (MELAA); and 2.2% other, which includes people giving their ethnicity as "New Zealander". English was spoken by 98.1%, Māori by 1.1%, and other languages by 11.7%. No language could be spoken by 1.4% (e.g. too young to talk). New Zealand Sign Language was known by 0.3%. The percentage of people born overseas was 24.1, compared with 28.8% nationally.

Religious affiliations were 24.3% Christian, 0.3% Hindu, 0.4% Buddhist, 0.5% New Age, 0.3% Jewish, and 1.1% other religions. People who answered that they had no religion were 68.7%, and 4.4% of people did not answer the census question.

Of those at least 15 years old, 804 (42.5%) people had a bachelor's or higher degree, 828 (43.8%) had a post-high school certificate or diploma, and 255 (13.5%) people exclusively held high school qualifications. The median income was $49,700, compared with $41,500 nationally. 351 people (18.6%) earned over $100,000 compared to 12.1% nationally. The employment status of those at least 15 was 969 (51.3%) full-time, 297 (15.7%) part-time, and 33 (1.7%) unemployed.

== Churches ==
=== Beckenham Baptist Church ===
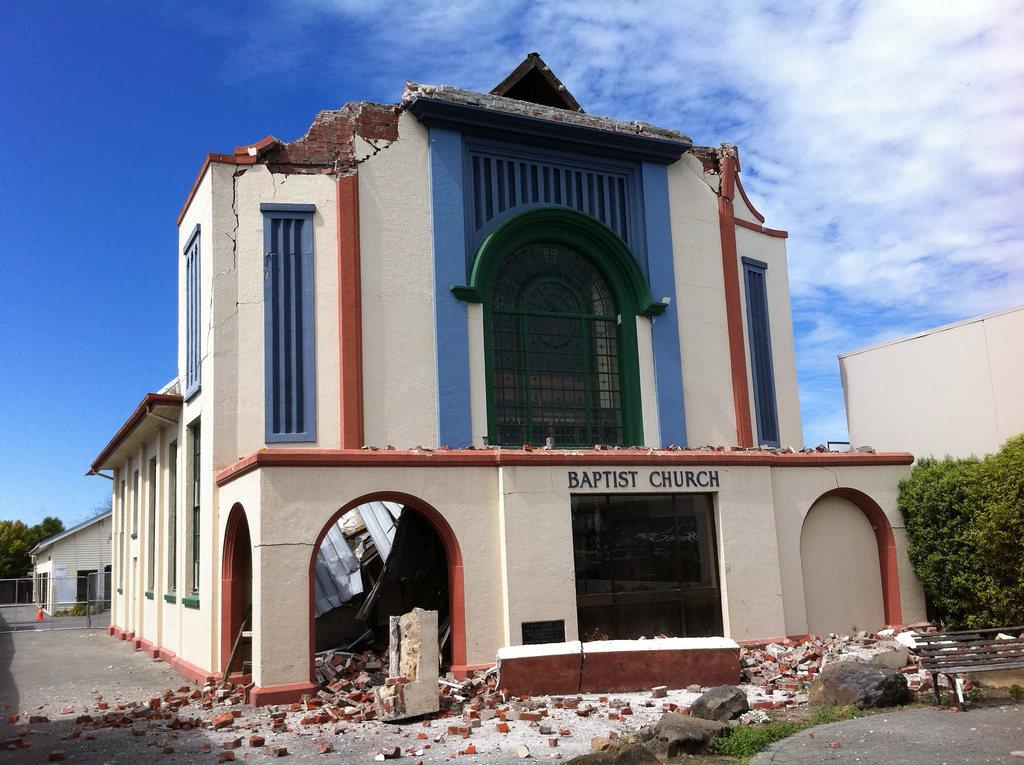
Beckenham Baptist Church suffered damage in the 2011 earthquakes. It has subsequently been demolished.

The Beckenham Baptist Church was built on Colombo Street at a cost of 3600 pounds and could seat 210 people. It was opened by the Governor General, Lord Bledisloe. In 1981 a mezzanine floor was added to the church. At the same time, the choir stalls and the pipe organ were removed. Damaged in the 2011 Christchurch Earthquakes, it was demolished soon after.

=== Beckenham Methodist Church ===
Beckenham Methodist Church is located at 83 Malcolm Ave, Christchurch.

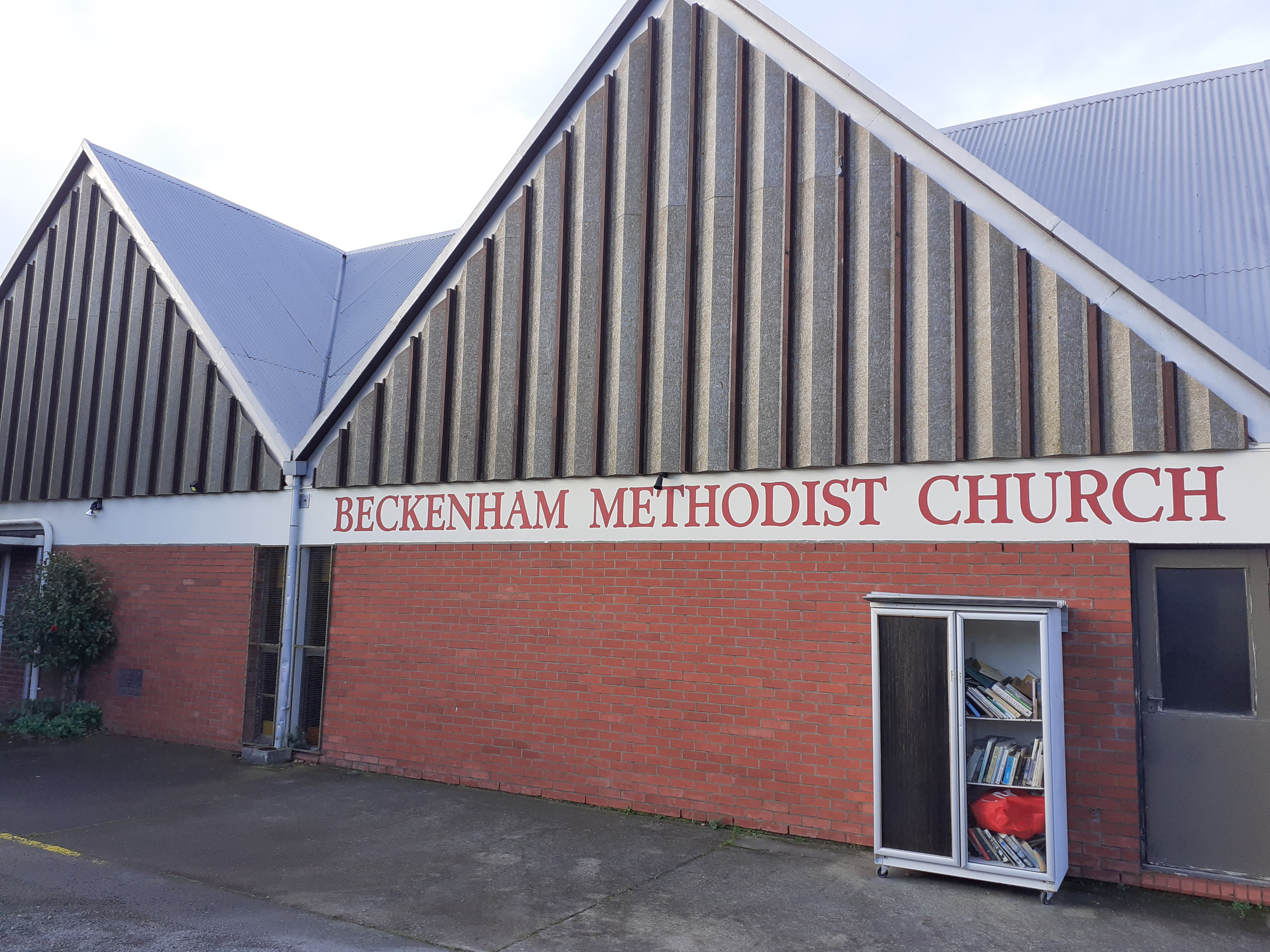
Beckenham Methodist Church (2021)

=== St Peter's Catholic Church ===
St Peter's Catholic Church and St Peters school are located on Fisher Avenue. St Peter's school was opened in 1927 with the land for the school donated by the Fisher family. It was proposed in 2019, that St Peter's Catholic Church could be closed in a reshuffle and amalgamation of parishes in Christchurch.

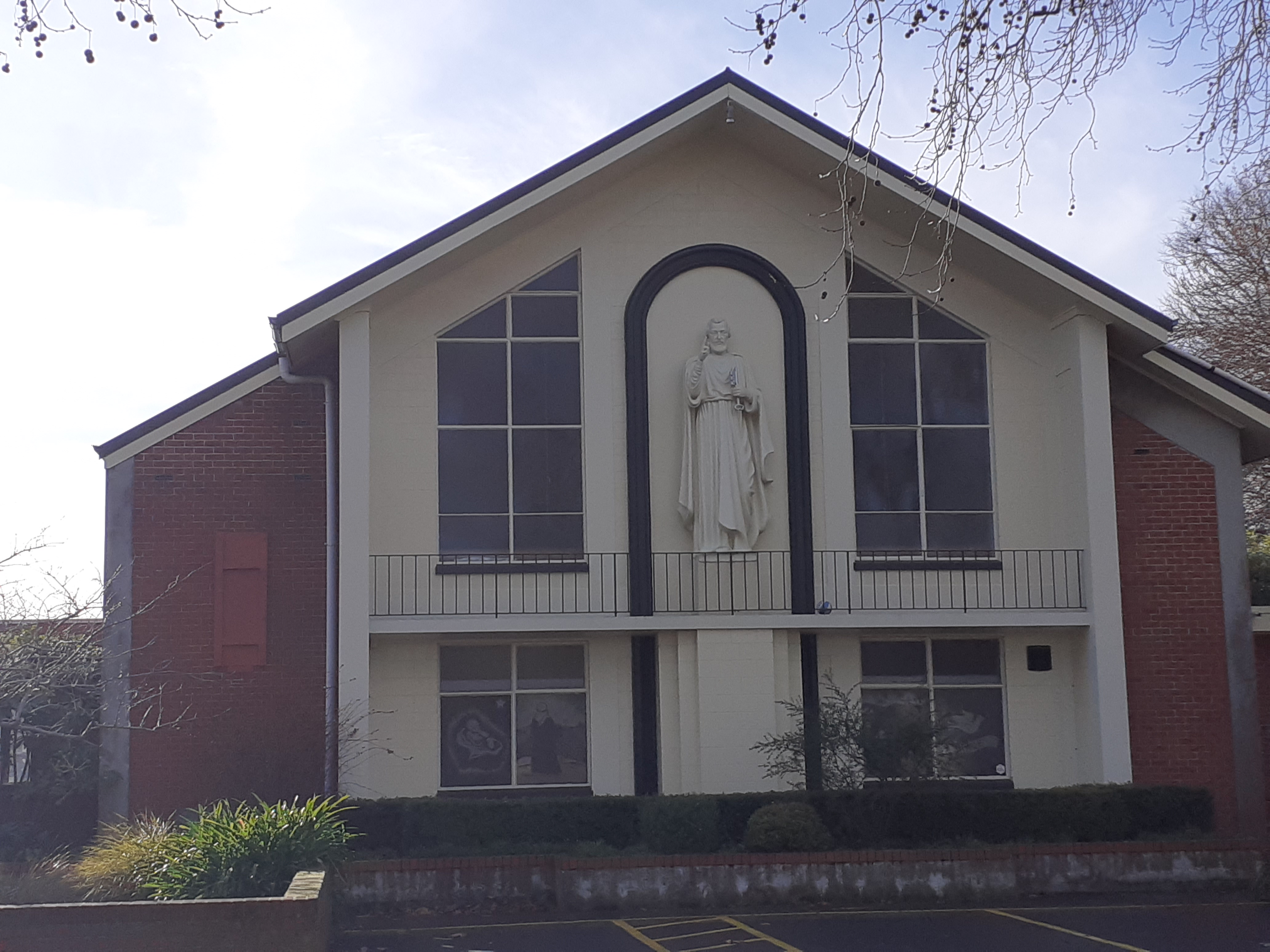
St Peters Beckenham (2021)

== Primary school ==
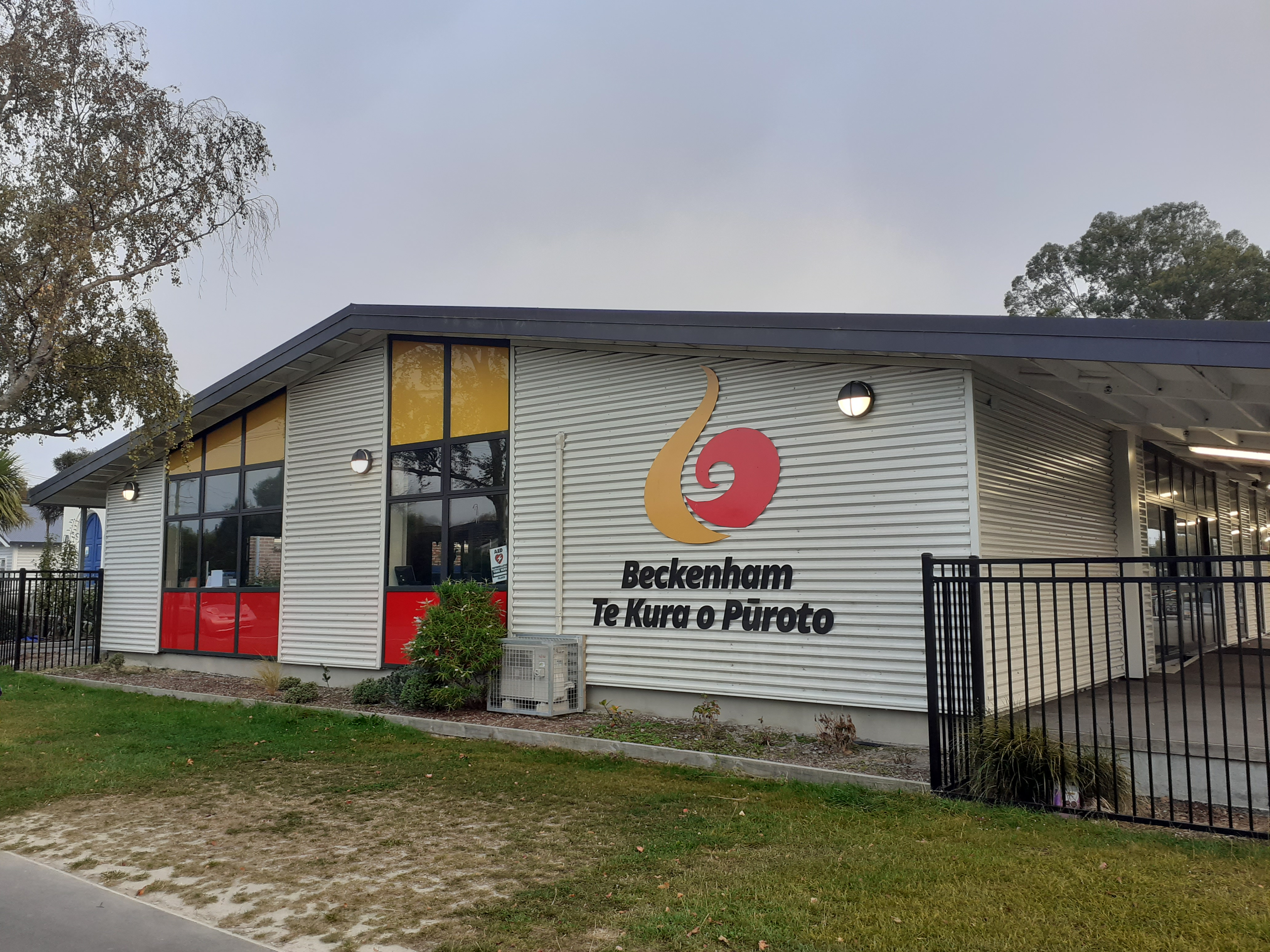
Beckenham Te Kura o Pūroto (2021)

Beckenham Te Kura o Pūroto is a state, co-educational, primary school catering for school Years 1 to 8, with a roll of 472 as of July 2026. The school opened as Beckenham School on Monday 8 February 1915. Beckenham School changed its name to Beckenham Te Kura o Pūroto on 1 January 2018 after the Ministry of Education approved the new name that was gifted by Ngāi Tūāhuriri rūnanga. Literally translated as "The School of the Ponds", the name reflects the school's location near the ponds of Beckenham Park alongside the Ōpāwaho / Heathcote River.

== South Library ==
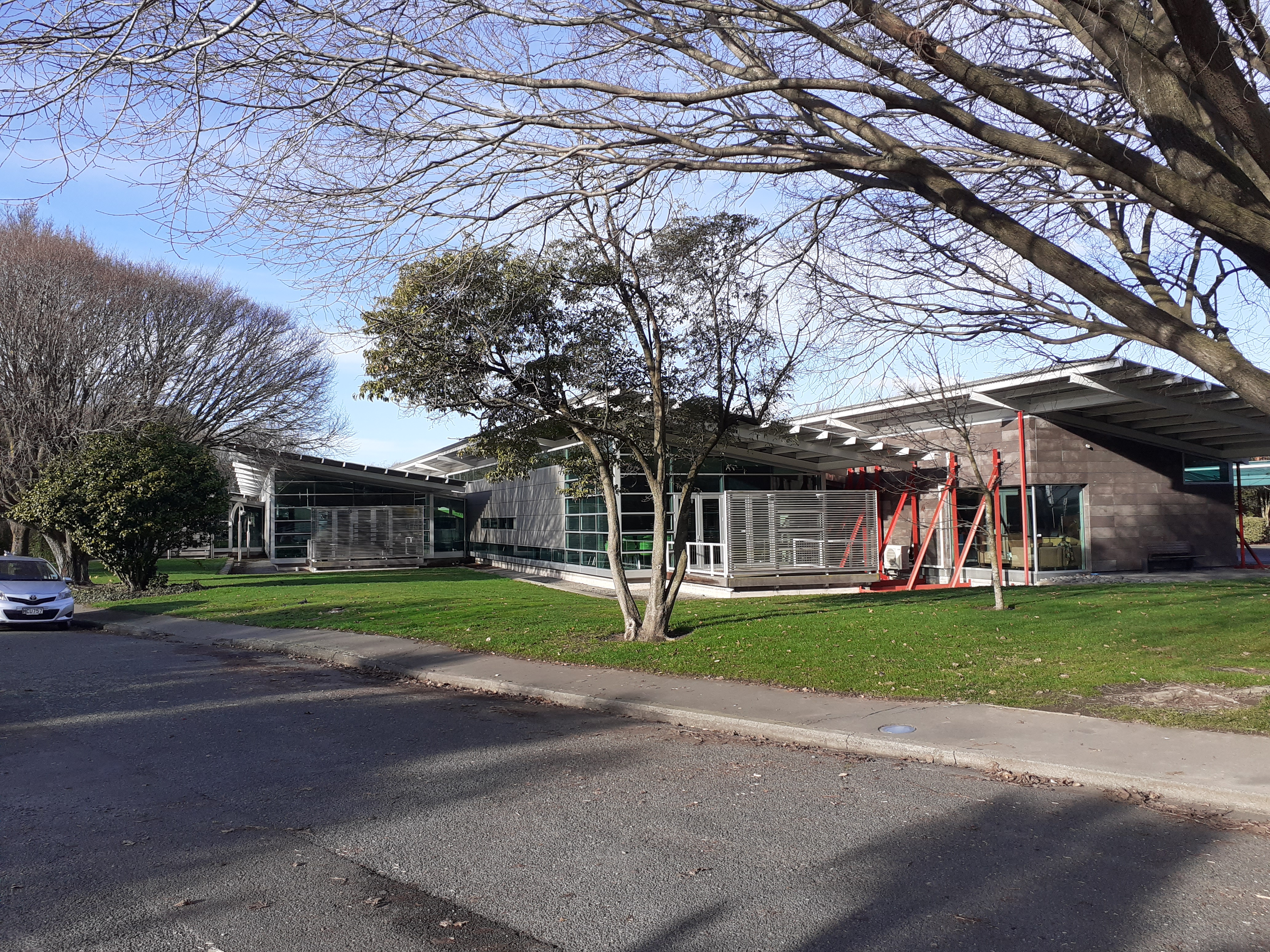
South Library (2021)

The South Library is located on Colombo Street by the Heathcote river. Designed by architects Warren and Mahoney and completed in 2003, The South Library provides 2400 square metres of space in a single story building. It was designed with numerous features that make it a particularly environmentally friendly building. In 2004, the library received a supreme award at the New Zealand Institute of Architects award ceremony. While it received temporary repairs following the 2011 earthquake, in 2022 it was decided to demolish and rebuild the library in 2024, at a projected cost of almost $25M.

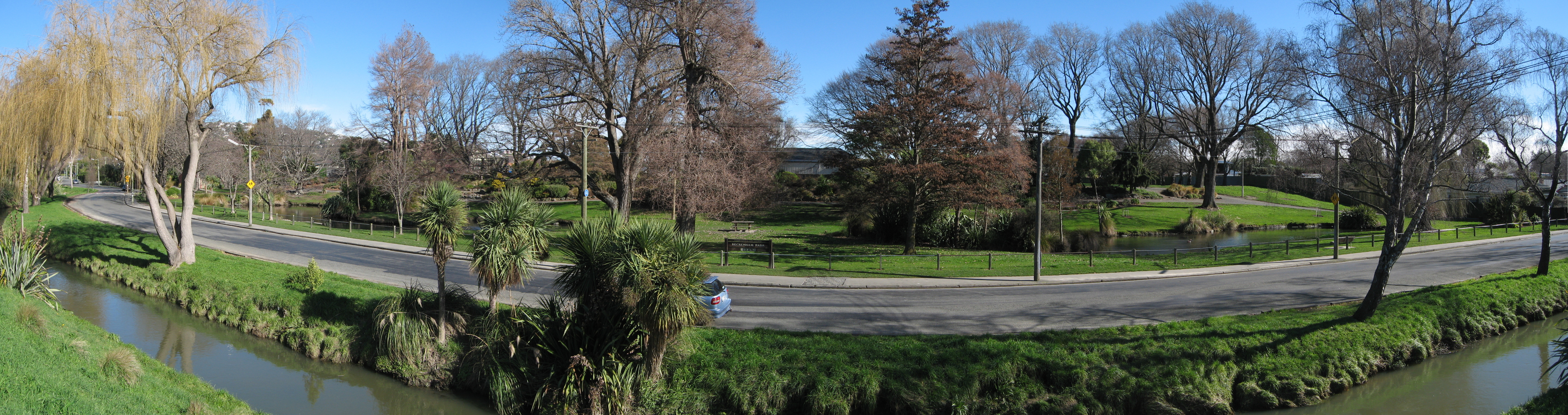
The Heathcote River and Beckenham Park on Eastern Terrace

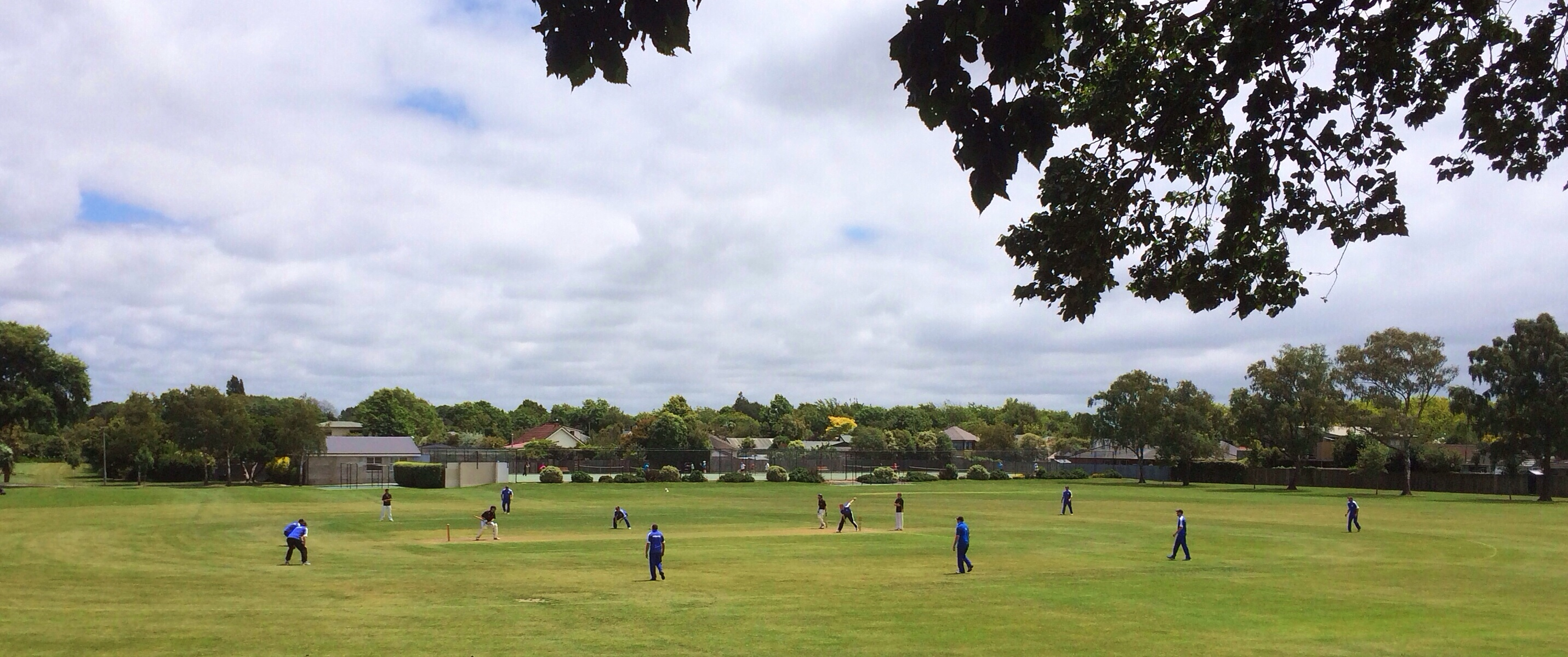
Weekend cricket in Beckenham Park
