= Lyttelton Tunnel =

Lyttelton Tunnel may refer to:

- Lyttelton rail tunnel
- Lyttelton road tunnel
