= Southern Motorway =

Southern Motorway can refer to one of several urban motorways within New Zealand:

- Auckland Southern Motorway
- Christchurch Southern Motorway
- Dunedin Southern Motorway
