= Christchurch–Lyttelton Motorway =

Road in Christchurch, New Zealand

Christchurch-Lyttelton Motorway

Route information
- Maintained by NZ Transport Agency
- Length: 6.1 km (3.8 mi)
- Existed: 1964–present

Major junctions
- North end: Dyers Road at Woolston, New Zealand
- South end: Norwich Quay at Lyttelton, New Zealand

Location
- Country: New Zealand
- Major cities: Woolston, Ferrymead, Heathcote, Lyttelton, New Zealand

Highway system
- New Zealand state highways; Motorways and expressways; List

The Christchurch–Lyttelton Motorway, also known as Tunnel Road, is part of the road network connecting Christchurch, New Zealand with its port at Lyttelton. It is part of State Highway 74.

== Route ==
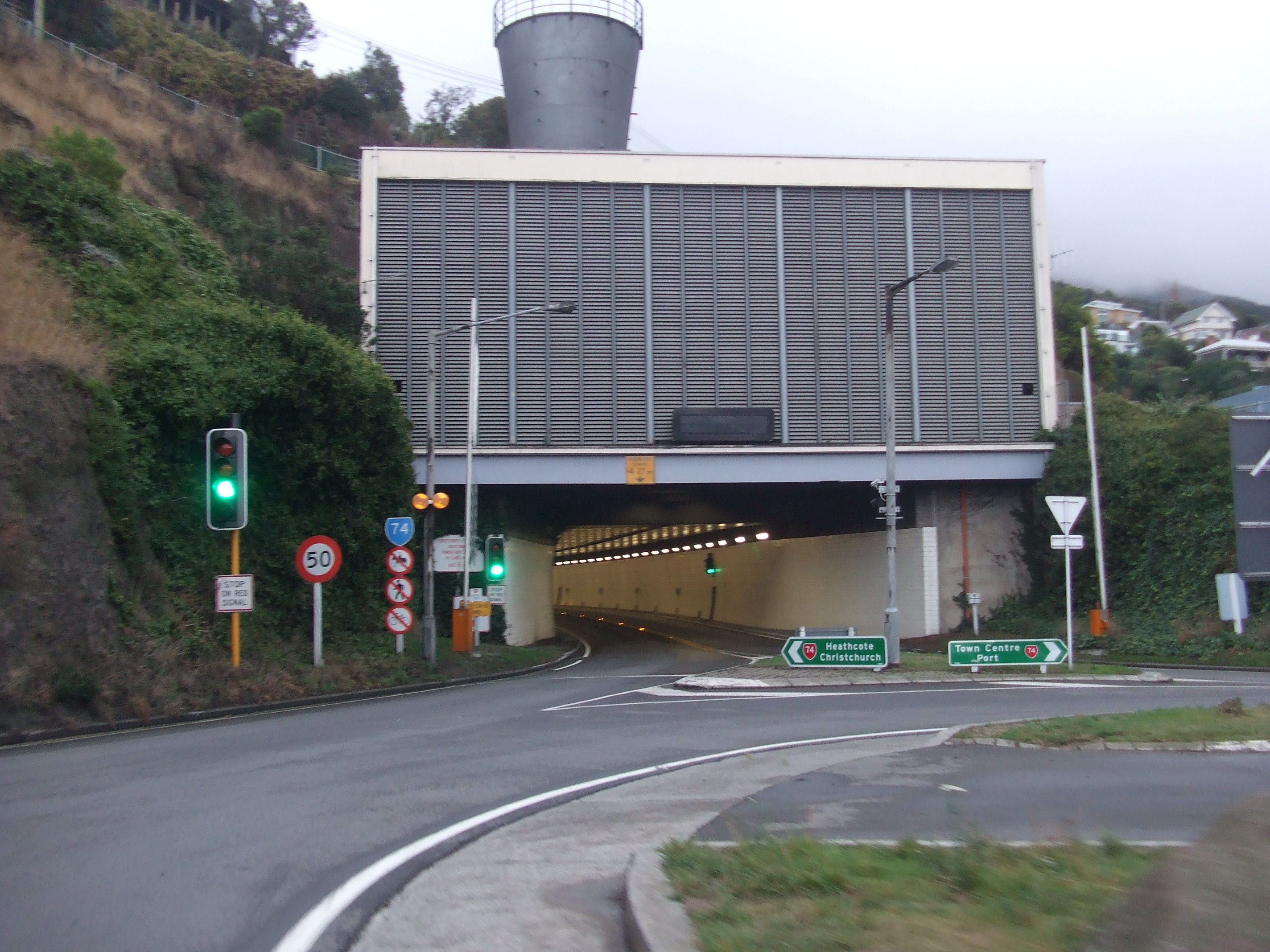
Christchurch–Lyttelton Motorway

The northern terminus is a roundabout on Ferry Road, a few hundred metres southeast of an intersection with the Christchurch ring route. The motorway immediately crosses the Ōpāwaho / Heathcote River and is carried on an embankment south across its swampy floodplain. The northern section is two lane, unlit and is relatively lightly trafficked, with the majority of traffic entering at a grade-separated parclo interchange with Port Hills Road which connects via the Opawa Expressway in Opawa to the north and west. South of the interchange the motorway climbs the western side of the Heathcote Valley, with a crawler lane and passing through some cuttings. The access road to Horotane valley, a side valley of the Heathcote, passes beneath the motorway, connecting to Port Hills Road which continues in parallel to the motorway.

At the head of the Heathcote Valley is the north entrance to the Lyttelton road tunnel, with a southbound on-ramp and northbound off-ramp to Bridle Path road. The tunnel's toll plaza was located here prior to the abolition of tolls in 1979. The speed limit is restricted to 50 km/h in the Lyttelton Road Tunnel. The motorway terminates at a roundabout immediately at the Lyttelton end of the tunnel.

== History ==
The 6.1 km road was completed in 1964 with the opening of the Lyttelton road tunnel, the country's second-longest road tunnel. It is designated a motorway, with pedestrians and cyclists excluded, although for the most part the road is 2-3 lane undivided carriageway.

== Interchanges ==
Territorial authority	Location	km	Destinations	Notes
Christchurch City	Woolston	22.0	(Ferry Road) – Woolston, City Centre; SH 74 north (Dyers Road) (Ferry Road) – Sumner	Christchurch-Lyttelton Motorway (Tunnel Road) begins
Christchurch City	Woolston	22.1	Ōpāwaho / Heathcote River Bridge	
Christchurch City	Heathcote	24.3	SH 76 (Port Hills Road) – Heathcote, Opawa, City Centre	Southbound entrance and exit using Scruttons Road
Christchurch City	Heathcote	26.0	(Bridle Path Road) – Heathcote	Northbound exit and southbound entrance only
Christchurch City	Heathcote	26.1	Lyttelton Road Tunnel (1.97 km (1.22 mi))	
Christchurch City	Lyttelton	28.1	Lyttelton Road Tunnel (1.97 km (1.22 mi))	
Christchurch City	Lyttelton	28.1	(Simeon Quay) – Naval Point, Governors Bay; SH 74 south (Norwich Quay) – Port	Christchurch–Lyttelton Motorway (Tunnel Road) ends
