= State Highway 76 (New Zealand) =

Road in New Zealand

State Highway 76
- Route of State Highway 76

Route information
- Maintained by NZ Transport Agency Waka Kotahi
- Length: 22.6 km (14.0 mi)

Major junctions
- East end: SH 74 (Christchurch–Lyttelton Motorway) near Christchurch
- West end: SH 1 (Main South Road) at Hornby, Christchurch

Location
- Country: New Zealand
- Primary destinations: Christchurch

Highway system
- New Zealand state highways; Motorways and expressways; List
← SH 75	→ SH 77

State Highway 76 (SH 76) is a state highway in Christchurch, New Zealand. This highway was gazetted in 2012 after stage 1 of the Christchurch Southern Motorway was completed. Beforehand, much of SH 76 was part of SH 73 and included the former two-lane Christchurch Arterial Motorway, which was upgraded to four lanes. SH 76 includes the majority of the length of the Christchurch Southern Motorway and forms the most direct route from the south of Christchurch to the city centre and Lyttelton.

== History ==
As part of the Fifth National Government's Roads of National Significance, stage 2 of the Christchurch Southern Motorway commenced construction in October 2016. This extended SH 76 to terminate with SH 1 further west near the intersection of Robinsons Road.

In early February 2025, the Sixth National Government prioritised the section of SH 76 along Brougham Street a "Road of Regional Significance" and confirmed it would invest between NZ$100-150 million in upgrading it. The upgrades include an overbridge between Collins and Simeon Streets.

In April 2025, the section of State Highway 76 between Curletts Road and its terminus (as well as the continuation of the Christchurch Southern Motorway on State Highway 1 to Weedons Road), became the first road in the South Island to be given a 110 km/h speed limit.

== Route ==
The highway currently begins at a grade separated intersection with SH 74 on the northern approach to the Lyttelton road tunnel. It travels east to west through suburban Christchurch via Port Hills Road, Opawa Road and Brougham Street. This section of road used to be part of SH 73. At the western end of Brougham Street at the Collins Street/Simeon Street lights, the Christchurch Southern Motorway commences. Midway up the motorway is the Curletts Road interchange, a major interchange where two state highways commence: SH 75 to Akaroa via Banks Peninsula and SH 73 to the West Coast via Arthur's Pass.

The motorway continues west for 7.5 kilometres, passing under the Halswell Junction Road and Shands Road interchanges, eventually terminating at SH 1 just north of Rolleston.

== Major junctions ==
Territorial authority	Location	km	mi	Destinations	Notes
Christchurch City	Ferrymead	0– 0.2	0.0– 0.12	SH 74 south (Christchurch-Lyttelton Motorway) – Lyttelton; SH 74 north (Christchurch-Lyttelton Motorway) – Woolston, Linwood	SH 76 begins Access to/from SH 74 southbound via Scruttons Road
Christchurch City	Waltham	3	1.9	SH 74A (Garlands Road) – Woolston, New Brighton	SH 76/Christchurch Ring Road concurrency begins
Christchurch City	Sydenham	6	3.7	Colombo Street – Beckenham, Cashmere, City Centre	
Christchurch City	Addington	8	5.0	Barrington Street – Addington, Cashmere	SH 76 becomes Christchurch Southern Motorway
Christchurch City	Middleton-Hillmorton-Wigram tripoint	11	6.8	SH 75 (Curletts Road) – Halswell, Akaroa; SH 73 (Curletts Road) – Upper Riccarton, Airport, West Coast	SH 76/Christchurch Ring Road concurrency ends
Selwyn District	Rolleston	23	14	SH 1 south (Main South Road) – Rolleston, Ashburton, Timaru; SH 1 north (Main South Road) – Templeton, Picton	SH 76 ends Christchurch Southern Motorway merges onto SH 1 (southbound)
1.000 mi = 1.609 km; 1.000 km = 0.621 mi: Concurrency terminus; Route transition

== See also ==
- List of New Zealand state highways
