= State Highway 75 (New Zealand) =

Road in New Zealand

State Highway 75

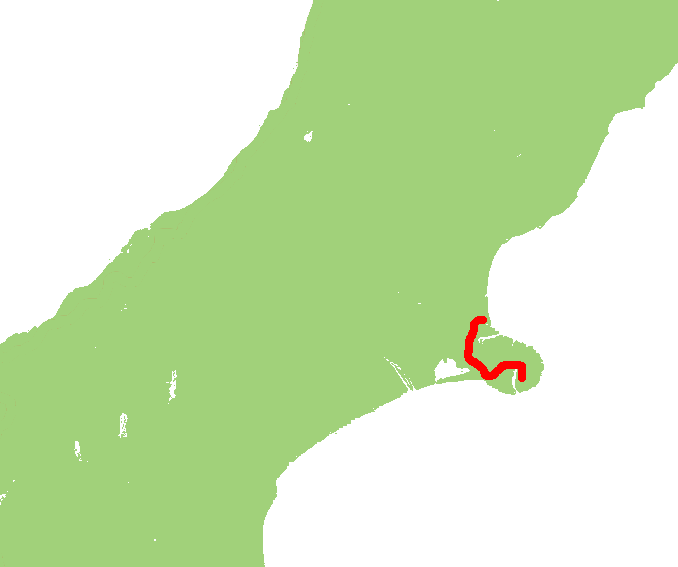

Route information
- Maintained by NZ Transport Agency Waka Kotahi
- Length: 76.9 km (47.8 mi)

Major junctions
- Northwest end: SH 73 (Curletts Road)/ SH 76 (Christchurch Southern Motorway) at Christchurch
- Southeast end: Woodills Road at Akaroa

Location
- Country: New Zealand
- Primary destinations: Halswell, Tai Tapu, Motukarara, Birdling's Flat, Little River, Cooptown, Duvauchelle, Takamatua

Highway system
- New Zealand state highways; Motorways and expressways; List
← SH 74	→ SH 76

State Highway 75 (SH 75) is a state highway in New Zealand servicing the Banks Peninsula region, connecting Christchurch on the northwestern part of the peninsula with Akaroa towards the east coast. It is wholly two lane (with the exception of some passing lanes near Hilltop), but partially functions as a major arterial corridor of Christchurch. Its highest point is at Hilltop, where it rises to about 476 m.

== Route ==
The highway currently begins at the intersection of Curletts Road and Christchurch Southern Motorway (the former SH 73, the latter SH 76) which is now a dogbone interchange. At Curletts Road, the road proceeds as a short expressway to the southeast until it reaches the intersection of Hoon Hay Road and Halswell Road. SH 75 turns right onto Halswell Road, and continues in a southwesterly direction until it just passes the settlement of Halswell.

Now known as Tai Tapu Road, the road skirts the outer edges of Banks Peninsula while passing through arable farmland to reach the settlement of Tai Tapu. The road then changes name to Christchurch Akaroa Highway while continuing to skirt between Lake Ellesmere / Te Waihora and the hills until Birdling's Flat, where it turns sharply into the hills of Banks Peninsula while hugging the shore of Lake Forsyth / Waiwera. The road proceeds through Western Valley to Little River and Cooptown.

After Cooptown, the road then begins to climb in a zigzag fashion towards Hilltop Saddle, which is frequently covered under snow during winter cold fronts. After Hilltop, the road descends in a similar fashion onto Akaroa Harbour at Barry's Bay. The road then hugs the shoreline as it passes through Duvauchelle and Takamatua before descending into Akaroa, terminating just before the Woodills Road/Rue Lavaud intersection.

== Route changes ==
In the early 1990s when SH 1 used to travel through central Christchurch, via Moorhouse Avenue, SH 75 covered the entire length of Lincoln Road and terminated there. When SH 1 was re-routed to the west of Christchurch, SH 75 was altered to its current route, terminating with the Christchurch Arterial Motorway (now the Christchurch Southern Motorway). The motorway at the same time became the new route for SH 73.

SH 75 used to travel down Rue Lavaud and Beach Road, terminating in the township of Akaroa. This has since been curtailed back. The former state highway section of Beach Road was redeveloped in the early 2000s.

== See also ==
- List of New Zealand state highways
