= State Highway 74 (New Zealand) =

Road in New Zealand

State Highway 74
- Christchurch Ring Road
- Route of State Highway 74

Route information
- Maintained by NZ Transport Agency
- Length: 28.4 km (17.6 mi)

Major junctions
- North end: SH 1 (Christchurch Northern Motorway) at Belfast
- Southeast end: Gladstone Quay at Lyttelton

Location
- Country: New Zealand
- Major cities: Christchurch

Highway system
- New Zealand state highways; Motorways and expressways; List
← SH 73	→ SH 75

State Highway 74 is a state highway in New Zealand servicing the eastern suburbs of Christchurch. Mostly two-lane, it is composed of limited-access expressways, with part of the highway as the Christchurch-Lyttelton Motorway, and connects the city to its port town of Lyttelton.

== Route ==
The highway begins immediately north of Belfast, with ramps connecting to the Western Bypass of the Christchurch Northern Motorway on State Highway 1. It then proceeds in a southerly direction on the Christchurch Northern Corridor (which opened in 2020) around the suburbs of Belfast, Northwood and Redwood.

At Mairehau, the highway turns east onto Queen Elizabeth II (QEII) Drive and begins its concurrency with the Christchurch Ring Road. As a dual carriageway, QEII Drive skirts through the northern suburbs of Christchurch, with major intersections at Innes Road and Marshland Road. After the Burwood Road traffic lights, the road changes name to Travis Road, drops to single carriage and runs in an easterly direction to the Anzac Drive/Frosts Road roundabout, where the highway turns right.

Now with the name Anzac Drive, the highway runs through the suburbs of Aranui and Bexley until reaching the Breezes Road/Bridge Street Roundabout. After the roundabout, the road changes name to Dyers Road. At Palinurus Road, the concurrency with the Ring Road ends, but Dyers Road keeps going in a southerly direction until the Ferry Road roundabout.

After the roundabout, the highway changes name to Tunnel Road and turns into the Christchurch-Lyttelton Motorway and passes through two interchanges before passing through the Lyttelton road tunnel.

In Lyttelton, the road changes name to Norwich Quay and acts as the main thoroughfare through the town and its associated port before terminating at the port gates as Gladstone Quay.

== Route changes ==
The route of SH 74 has been rearranged quite frequently for a State Highway, initially gazetted in 1964 upon the opening of the Lyttelton Road Tunnel, it only consisted of the motorway and the short section through Lyttelton.

When State Highway 1 went through Christchurch was rerouted to bypass the city in the early 1990s, State Highways 73 and 74 were extended to cover much of the original route, with SH 74 initially continuing through at QEII Drive/Northcote Road to travel via Cranford and Sherborne Streets. In Christchurch CBD, the route turned left onto Bealey Avenue and then onto the parallel one-way roads Madras and Barbadoes Street. The road then turned left onto Moorhouse Avenue and then right onto Waltham Road before turning left again onto Brougham Street. The road then proceeded in a south-easterly direction until the Port Hills Road interchange with Tunnel Road. In 2004, the route was realigned to its current route, with much of the previous route either revoked or taken over by SH 73.

In November 2017, the Christchurch Northern Motorway's Western Bypass was opened, taking State Highway 1 to the west of Belfast, and State Highway 74's route was extended north along SH1's previous route up Main North Road from the Johns Road intersection to the previously existing motorway.

With the recent opening of the Christchurch Northern Corridor as a road of national significance, SH 74, bypasses the northern suburbs of Redwood and Belfast. Previously the highway followed Main North Road and the western section of QEII Drive. The Christchurch Northern Corridor opened in December 2020.

== Major intersections ==
For Tunnel Road's major intersection, refer to Christchurch-Lyttelton Motorway

Territorial authority	Location	km	jct	Destinations	Notes
Christchurch City	Belfast	0		SH 1 (Christchurch Northern Motorway)	SH 74 begins Northbound exit and southbound entrance only SH 74/Christchurch Northern Corridor concurrency begins
Christchurch City	Mairehau			Christchurch Northern Corridor (southbound) – City Centre	SH 74/Christchurch Northern Corridor concurrency ends SH 74/Christchurch Ring Road concurrency begins
Christchurch City	Mairehau			Christchurch Northern Corridor (northbound) (Queen Elizabeth II Drive – west)	SH 74/Christchurch Northern Corridor concurrency ends SH 74/Christchurch Ring Road concurrency begins
Christchurch City	Mairehau	9.7		(Innes Road) – Mairehau, Saint Albans	
Christchurch City	Marshland	10.3		(Marshland Road) – Kaiapoi, Shirley	
Christchurch City	New Brighton	13.7		(Frosts Road) – Parklands (Travis Road) – North New Brighton	
Christchurch City	New Brighton	14.5		(New Brighton Road) – New Brighton, Dallington, City Centre	
Christchurch City	New Brighton	14.6		Avon River / Ōtākaro Bridge	
Christchurch City	Wainoni	15.2		(Wainoni Road) – New Brighton, Wainoni, Linwood	
Christchurch City	Bexley	16.4		(Pages Road) – New Brighton, Linwood, City Centre	
Christchurch City	Bromley	18.0		(Bridge Street) – South New Brighton (Breezes Road) – Aranui, City Centre	
Christchurch City	Bromley	21.2		(Linwood Avenue) – Ferrymead, Sumner, Linwood, City Centre	
Christchurch City	Woolston	21.7		SH 74A (Palinurus Road) – Woolston, City Centre	SH 74/Christchurch Ring Road concurrency ends
Christchurch City	Woolston	22.0		(Ferry Road) – Sumner, Woolston, City Centre	Christchurch-Lyttelton Motorway (Tunnel Road) begins
Christchurch City	Woolston	22.1		Ōpāwaho / Heathcote River Bridge	
Christchurch City	Heathcote	24.3		SH 76 (Port Hills Road) – Healthcote, Opawa, City Centre	
Christchurch City	Heathcote	26.0		(Bridle Path Road) – Heathcote	Northbound exit and southbound entrance only
Christchurch City	Heathcote	26.1		Lyttelton Road Tunnel (1.97 km (1.22 mi))	
Christchurch City	Lyttelton	28.1		Lyttelton Road Tunnel (1.97 km (1.22 mi))	
Christchurch City	Lyttelton	28.1		(Simeon Quay) – Naval Point, Governors Bay	Christchurch-Lyttelton Motorway (Tunnel Road) ends
Christchurch City	Lyttelton	28.5		(Oxford Street) – Town Centre, Sumner	
28.8	Lyttelton		(Gladstone Quay) – Port	SH 74 ends	

== Spur sections ==
State Highway 74A
- Christchurch Ring Road
- Location: Bromley–Woolston
- Length: 2.1 km (1.3 mi)

State Highway 74A is a minor Christchurch arterial road connecting the southeastern industrial suburbs of Bromley and Woolston. It was gazetted as a new state highway in 2003 at the same time SH 74 was shifted to its current location. It is just over 2 kilometres long and consists of three roads – Garlands Road, Palinurus Road and Rutherford Street. It runs concurrent with the Christchurch Ring Road for its entire length.

=== Major intersections ===
Territorial authority	Location	km	jct	Destinations	Notes
Christchurch City	Woolston	0		SH 74 north (Dyers Road) – Bromley, New Brighton, Picton; SH 74 south (Dyers Road) – Lyttelton	SH 74A begins SH 74A/Christchurch Ring Road concurrency begins
Christchurch City	Woolston	0.5		(Ferry Road) – Sumner, Woolston, City Centre	
Christchurch City	Woolston	0.7		Ōpāwaho / Heathcote River	
Christchurch City	Opawa	1.9		Lyttelton Line	
Christchurch City	Opawa	2.1		SH 76 east (Opawa Road) – Lyttelton; SH 76 west (Opawa Road) – Waltham, City Centre	SH 74A ends SH 74A/Christchurch Ring Road concurrency ends

== See also ==
- Christchurch-Lyttelton Motorway
