= Tamariki School =

School in Christchurch, New Zealand

Location
- 86 St Johns Street, Christchurch, New Zealand; 43.5467°S 172.6895°E

Information
- Type: State, Co-educational, Primary
- Motto: know thyself
- Established: 1966
- Ministry of Education Institution no.: 4143
- Principal: Blake Michell
- Enrolment: 49 (July 2026)
- Socio-economic decile: 4
- Website: tamariki.school.nz

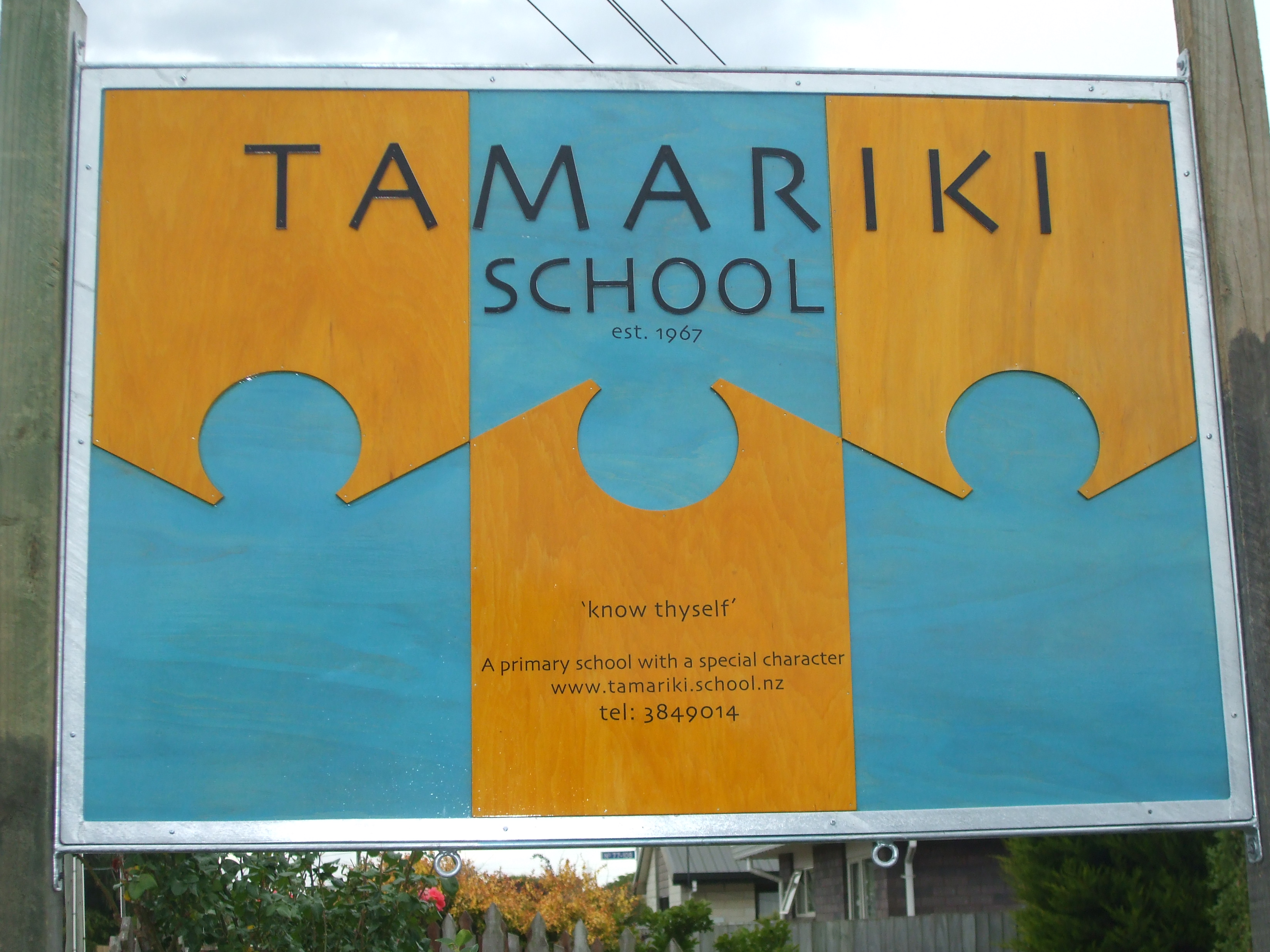
School sign

Tamariki School is the oldest 'free school' in New Zealand and one of the oldest in the world. It was founded in 1966 by a group of parents and teachers interested in preventive mental health. It is located in the Christchurch suburb of Woolston.

Its name is the Māori word for young children.

== Special character ==
The school is loosely modelled on Summerhill School.

Originally a private school, owned and operated by the parents, Tamariki integrated into the state system as a special character school in 1990.

== History ==
The Tamariki School was formed in 1966 by a group of parents and teachers who owned and operated the school, the school was formally opened in 1967. This group became the Proprietor of Tamariki School, and entered into an integration agreement with the Ministry of Education in 1990, to operate a state integrated primary school with a Special Character under the Private Schools Conditional Integration Act 1975. In 2017 Tamariki Celebrated its 50th Jubilee.
