= Motukarara =

- Locality
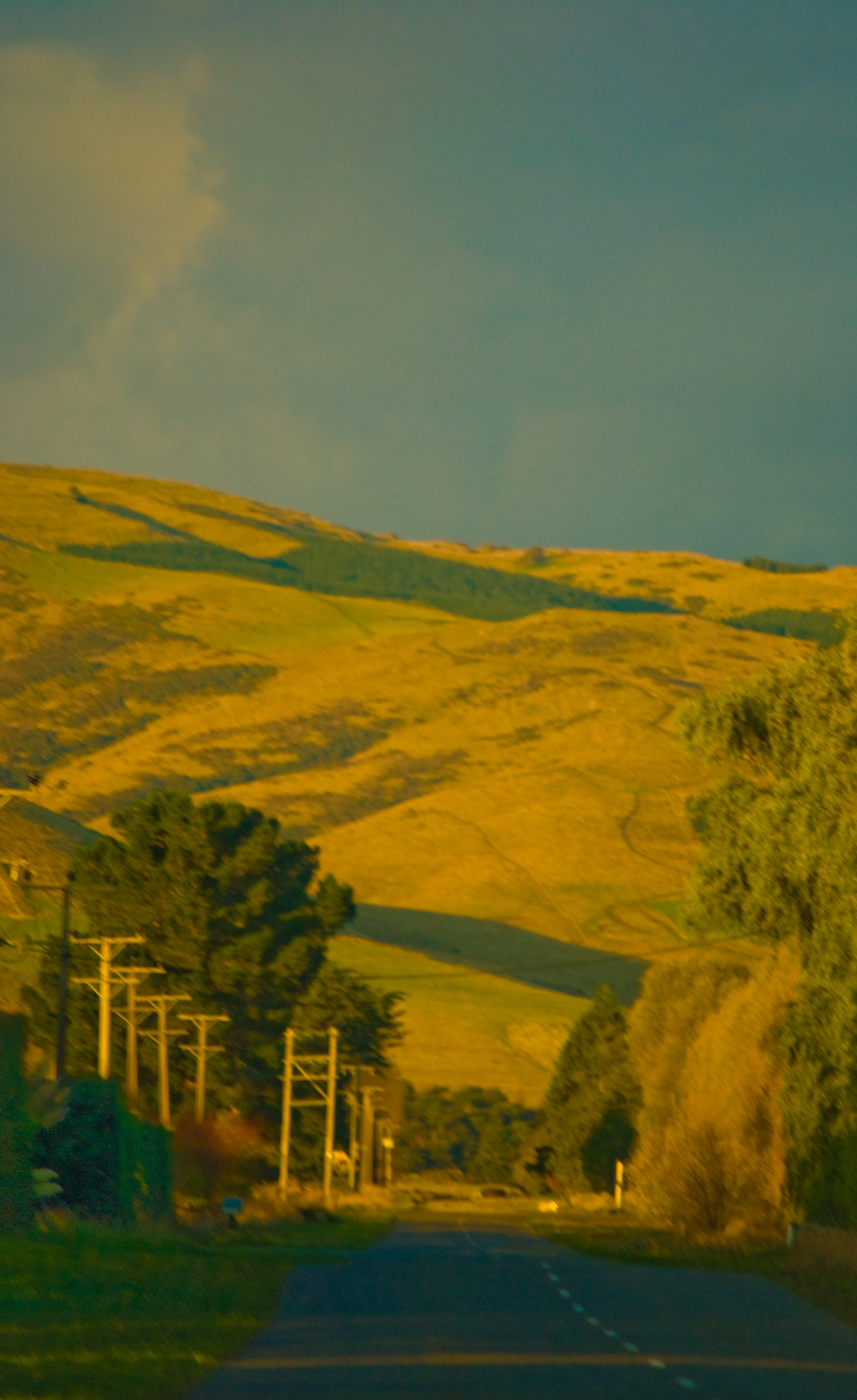
- Rural road near Motukarara
- Interactive map of Motukarara
- Coordinates: 43.725°S 172.581°E
- Country: New Zealand
- Island: South Island
- Region: Canterbury
- Territorial authority: Selwyn District
- Ward: Ellesmere
- Electorates: Selwyn; Te Tai Tonga (Māori)

Government
  - Territorial authority: Selwyn District Council
  - Regional council: Environment Canterbury
  - Mayor of Selwyn: Lydia Gliddon
  - Selwyn MP: Nicola Grigg
  - Te Tai Tonga MP: Tākuta Ferris

Area
  - Total: 24.68 km^{2} (9.53 sq mi)

Population (2023 census)
  - Total: 198
  - Density: 8.02/km^{2} (20.8/sq mi)
- Time zone: UTC+12 (NZST)
  - Summer (DST): UTC+13 (NZDT)
- Postcode: 7672
- Area code: 03
- Local iwi: Ngāi Tahu

Motukarara is a locality to the northeast of Lake Ellesmere / Te Waihora in the Selwyn District of New Zealand. State Highway 75 passes through the centre of the village, connecting Christchurch with Akaroa and the Banks Peninsula. The Little River Branch, which operated between 1886 and 1962, ran through Motukarara, and is now a shared walkway and cycleway.

Motukarara Racecourse is a grass harness racing track operated by the Banks Peninsula Trotting Club.

Greenpark Huts was a small village on the shore of Lake Ellesmere / Te Waihora. The land belongs to Te Rūnanga o Ngāi Tahu, which gave notice in 2020 it did not intend to renew leases when they expire on 30 June 2024, due to limited drinking water, poor wastewater systems and sea level rise. The final date was 30 June 2025, with most residents signing over their huts to Te Rūnanga o Ngāi Tahu to avoid having to pay clearance fees.

== Demographics ==
Motukarara locality covers 24.68 km^{2} (9.53 sq mi). It is part of the Motukarara statistical area.

Historical population for the locality
Year	Pop.	±% p.a.
2006	159	—
2013	207	+3.84%
2018	177	−3.08%
2023	198	+2.27%

The locality had a population of 198 in the 2023 New Zealand census, an increase of 21 people (11.9%) since the 2018 census, and a decrease of 9 people (−4.3%) since the 2013 census. There were 99 males and 99 females in 78 dwellings. 4.5% of people identified as LGBTIQ+. The median age was 42.9 years (compared with 38.1 years nationally). There were 39 people (19.7%) aged under 15 years, 24 (12.1%) aged 15 to 29, 108 (54.5%) aged 30 to 64, and 24 (12.1%) aged 65 or older.

People could identify as more than one ethnicity. The results were 93.9% European (Pākehā), 7.6% Māori, 3.0% Pasifika, and 6.1% other, which includes people giving their ethnicity as "New Zealander". English was spoken by 98.5%, Māori by 1.5%, and other languages by 6.1%. No language could be spoken by 1.5% (e.g. too young to talk). New Zealand Sign Language was known by 1.5%. The percentage of people born overseas was 12.1, compared with 28.8% nationally.

Religious affiliations were 30.3% Christian, 1.5% New Age, and 1.5% other religions. People who answered that they had no religion were 62.1%, and 4.5% of people did not answer the census question.

Of those at least 15 years old, 36 (22.6%) people had a bachelor's or higher degree, 93 (58.5%) had a post-high school certificate or diploma, and 33 (20.8%) people exclusively held high school qualifications. The median income was $49,600, compared with $41,500 nationally. 15 people (9.4%) earned over $100,000 compared to 12.1% nationally. The employment status of those at least 15 was 105 (66.0%) full-time, 24 (15.1%) part-time, and 3 (1.9%) unemployed.

=== Motukarara statistical area ===
Motukarara statistical area includes Greenpark and Greenpark Huts. It covers 64.67 km^{2} (24.97 sq mi) and had an estimated population of 660 as of June 2025, with a population density of 10.2 people per km^{2}.

Historical population for the statistical area
Year	Pop.	±% p.a.
2006	588	—
2013	693	+2.37%
2018	612	−2.46%
2023	642	+0.96%

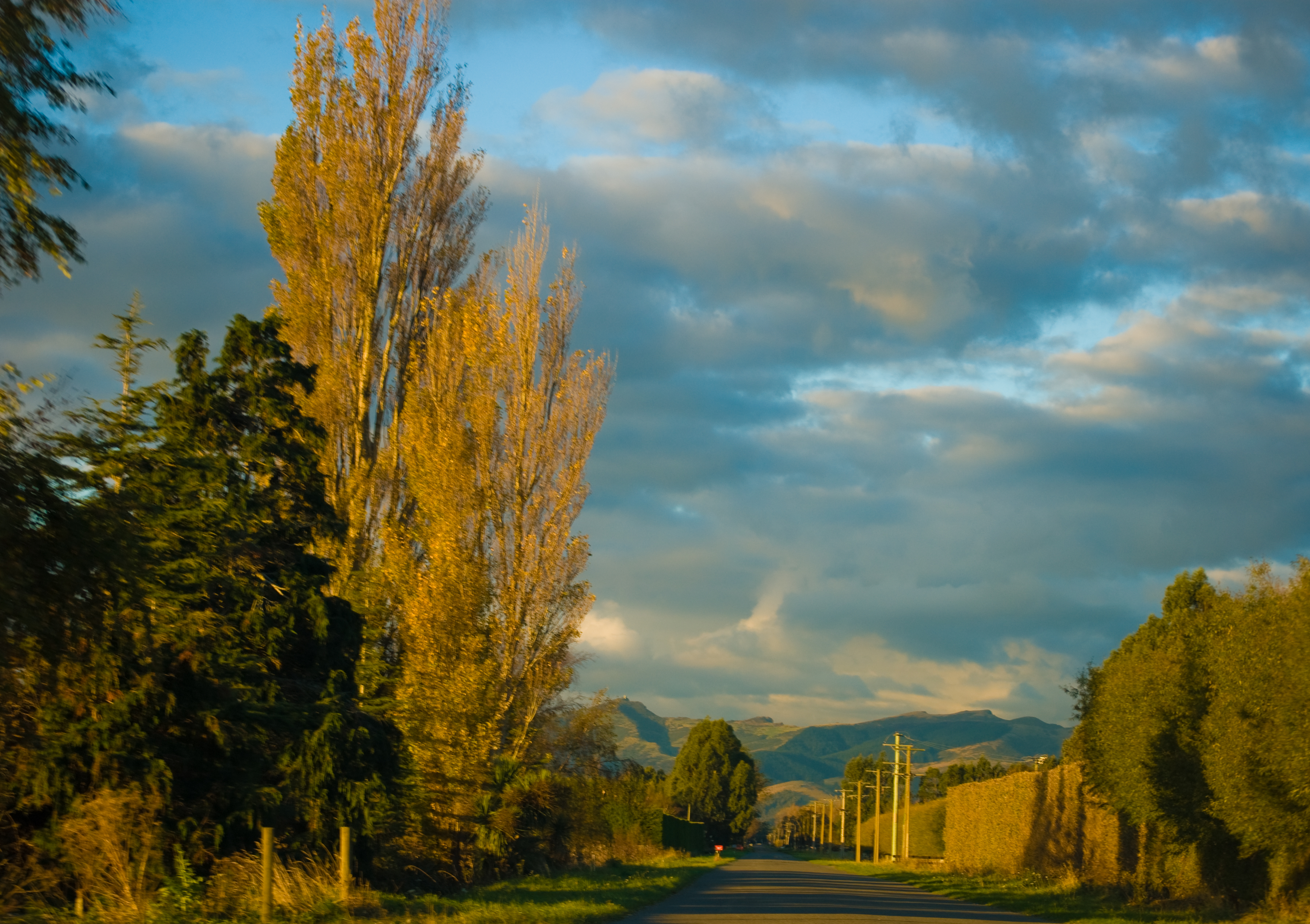
Near Motukarara

Motukarara statistical area had a population of 642 in the 2023 New Zealand census, an increase of 30 people (4.9%) since the 2018 census, and a decrease of 51 people (−7.4%) since the 2013 census. There were 330 males and 312 females in 255 dwellings. 2.8% of people identified as LGBTIQ+. The median age was 43.5 years (compared with 38.1 years nationally). There were 117 people (18.2%) aged under 15 years, 96 (15.0%) aged 15 to 29, 327 (50.9%) aged 30 to 64, and 99 (15.4%) aged 65 or older.

People could identify as more than one ethnicity. The results were 93.0% European (Pākehā); 8.4% Māori; 1.9% Pasifika; 3.7% Asian; 0.5% Middle Eastern, Latin American and African New Zealanders (MELAA); and 2.3% other, which includes people giving their ethnicity as "New Zealander". English was spoken by 97.2%, Māori by 0.9%, Samoan by 0.5%, and other languages by 10.3%. No language could be spoken by 2.3% (e.g. too young to talk). New Zealand Sign Language was known by 1.4%. The percentage of people born overseas was 18.2, compared with 28.8% nationally.

Religious affiliations were 32.7% Christian, 0.9% Hindu, 0.5% New Age, and 1.9% other religions. People who answered that they had no religion were 55.6%, and 8.4% of people did not answer the census question.

Of those at least 15 years old, 138 (26.3%) people had a bachelor's or higher degree, 297 (56.6%) had a post-high school certificate or diploma, and 90 (17.1%) people exclusively held high school qualifications. The median income was $49,800, compared with $41,500 nationally. 75 people (14.3%) earned over $100,000 compared to 12.1% nationally. The employment status of those at least 15 was 321 (61.1%) full-time, 96 (18.3%) part-time, and 9 (1.7%) unemployed.
