= Christchurch Southern Motorway =

Road in Christchurch, New Zealand

Christchurch Southern Motorway

Route information
- Length: 20 km (12 mi)
- Existed: 4 May 1981–present

Major junctions
- East end: Brougham Street at Addington
- West end: Weedons Ross Road at Rolleston

Location
- Country: New Zealand
- Major cities: Christchurch

Highway system
- New Zealand state highways; Motorways and expressways; List

The Christchurch Southern Motorway is the main southern route into and out of Christchurch, New Zealand. The motorway forms part of State Highway 1 (SH 1) and State Highway 76 (SH 76).

The motorway, which heads in a generally south-west direction, is approximately 20 km (12 mi) in length. It links the inner-city suburb of Addington, where it starts at the western end of Brougham Street, to just north-east of the satellite centre of Rolleston in the Selwyn District.

== Route ==
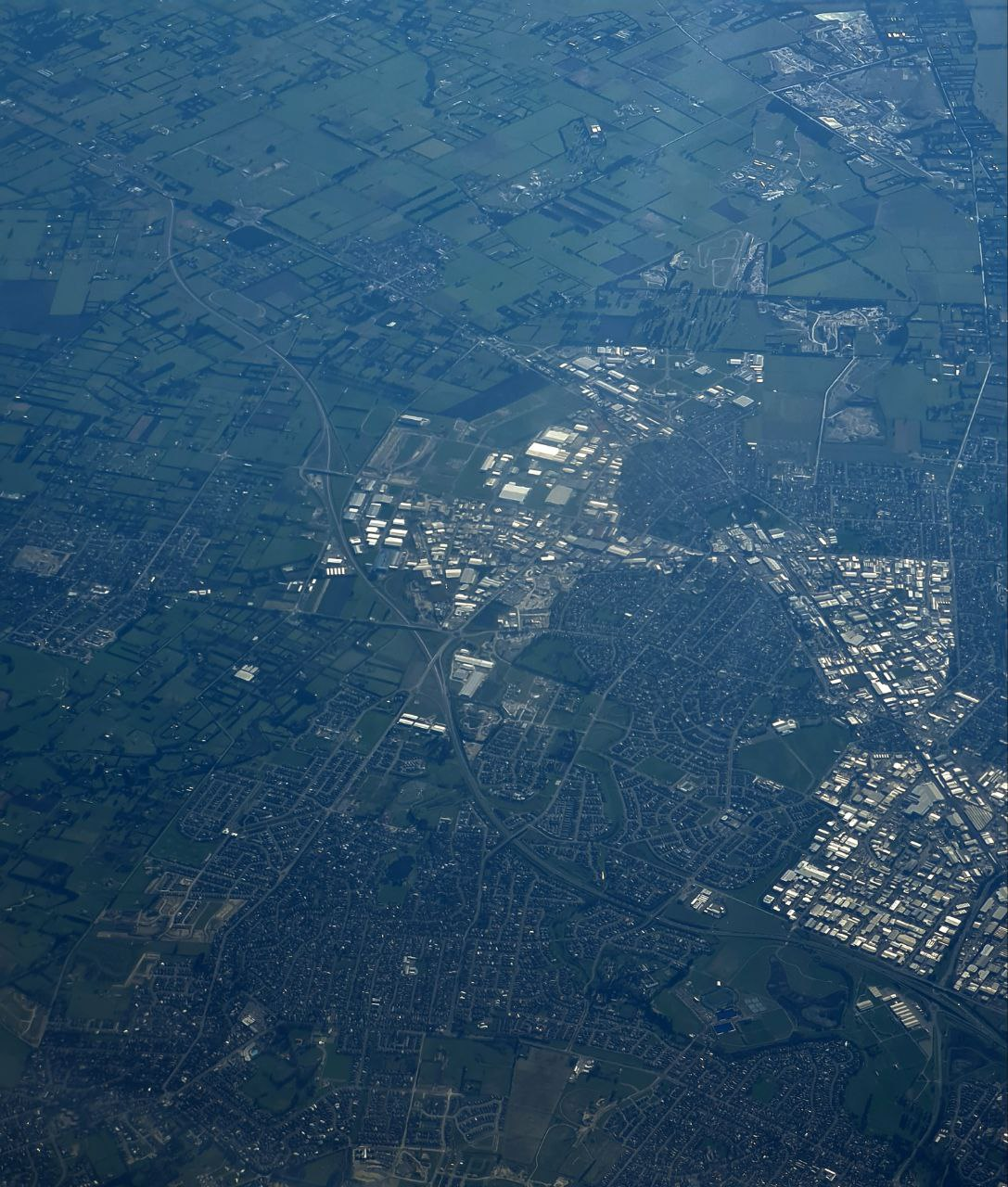
Aerial view of the motorway between the junctions of SH1 and SH 73/75 Curletts Road

The Christchurch Southern Motorway begins in the suburb of Addington at the western end of Brougham Street (at the Collins Street intersection), which is a busy multi-lane road linking to the port at Lyttelton, just south of the Christchurch Central Business District (CBD) on SH 76.

The motorway continues south-west, crossing Barrington Street (where there is an interchange) and Lincoln Road and passing to the south of Middleton. There is an interchange at Curletts Road, then skirts to the south of Wigram, passing under Aidanfield Drive and Awatea Road.

After the Halswell Junction Road interchange it runs to the south of Hornby and Isllington, and north of Prebbleton, to an interchange at Shands Road. From there, it continues south-west and joins Main South Road/SH 1 south of Templeton, and continues to an interchange at Weedons Road, ending just north of Rolleston. SH 1 continues south towards Ashburton as a regular two-lane highway.

== History ==
Plans for a motorway network in Christchurch were first revealed in 1962, with the release of the Christchurch Master Transportation Plan. The Christchurch Southern Motorway, which formed a critical component of this plan, was proposed to run from Templeton to an interchange with the Christchurch Northern Motorway at Waltham, just south of the CBD. The first section of the motorway, a short two-lane arterial, opened in 1981, linking Brougham Street with Curletts Road. Further motorway work was subsequently deferred due to a lack of funding.

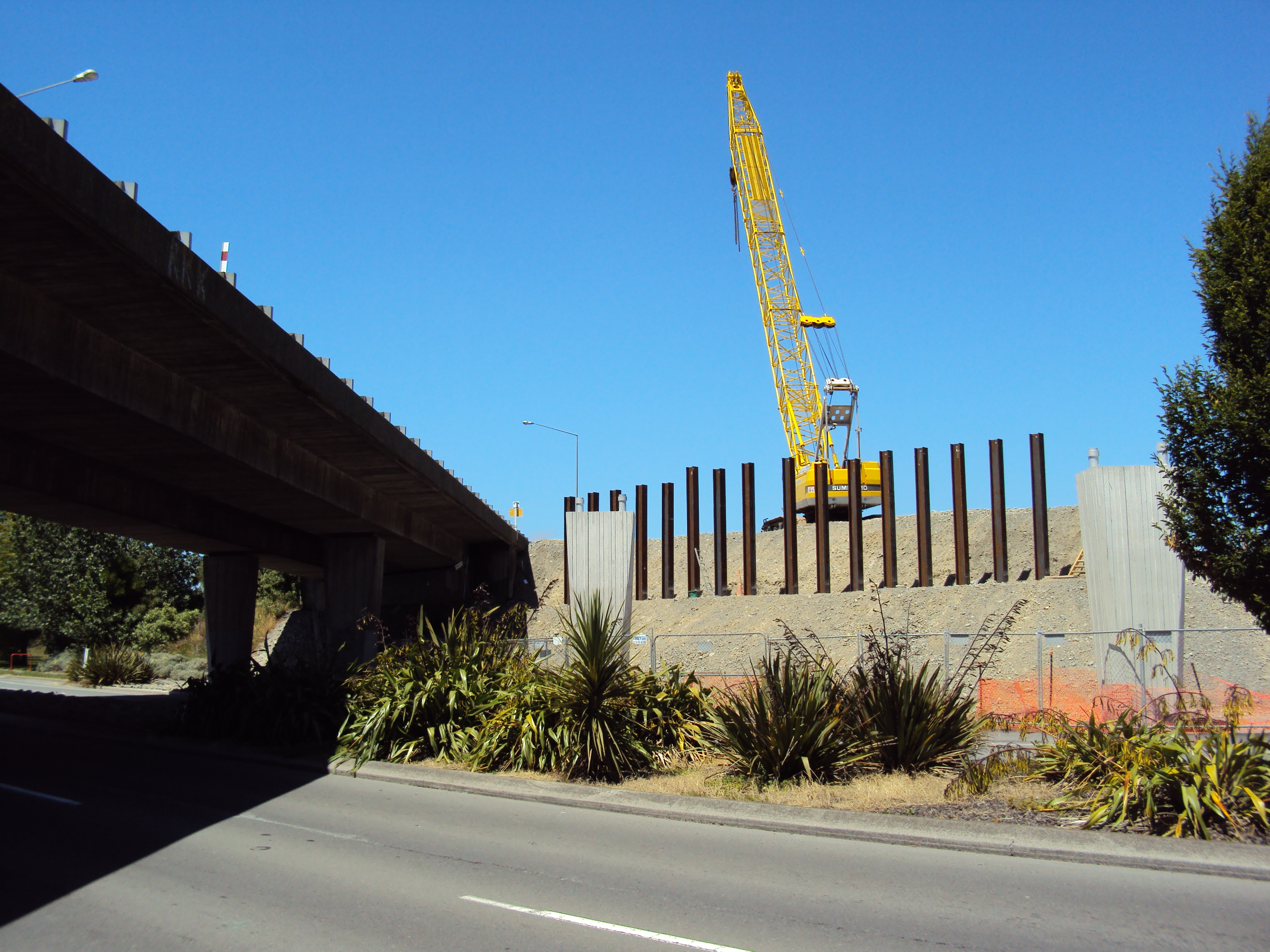
Duplication of the Lincoln Road overbridge on the Christchurch Southern Motorway, December 2011. The original 1981 two-lane bridge is to the left.

In 2012 a project was completed duplicating the existing motorway section, including a new flyover to link the motorway directly to Brougham Street. At the same time, the motorway was extended from Curletts Road, where a new full interchange was built, to a new terminating roundabout at Halswell Junction Road, a total length of approximately 7.5 km from Brougham Street. A cycleway was built along the length of the motorway on both sides. North of Springs Road, Halswell Junction Road was upgraded to form a two-lane undivided link from the motorway to SH 1 at Templeton.

In 2020, the motorway was extended approximately 12.5 km to the south-west as far as Rolleston. A 7.5 km extension of the motorway was constructed to Robinsons Road south of Templeton where it joined SH 1, which was upgraded as far as Rolleston. The new extension includes a half interchange at Halswell Junction Road to replace the roundabout, a full diamond interchange at Shands Road, and a grade separated 'Y-junction' interchange south-west of Isllington where the extension joins the existing SH 1.

Aerial view of the Weedons Road interchange, November 2026

The existing SH 1 along Main South Road was duplicated and upgraded to motorway standard as far as Weedons Road, where a folded diamond interchange was built. This included removing direct access to the highway from private property through provision of two new local access roads.

In April 2025, a 17.7km section of the motorway between Curletts Road and its terminus at Weedons Road, became the first road in the South Island to be given a 110 km/h speed limit.

== Future projects ==
Two projects have been funded adjacent to each end of the motorway as part of the New Zealand Upgrade Programme. At the eastern end, $40 million will be spent on SH 76 (Brougham Street) to prioritise public transport routes, create safer, dedicated walking and cycling access (footbridge overpass), and ensuring better east-west traffic flow and capacity. Construction for this began on 16 July 2025.

At the southern end, $60 million will be spent on a new two-lane overbridge to cross SH 1 from Rolleston Drive to Hoskyns Road, and to upgrade four intersections along SH 1 between Burnham and Rolleston. The upgrades will include the realignment of SH 1, Dunns Crossing Road, and Walkers Road, a new roundabout and pedestrian underpass, and a new level crossing. This is to better manage the forecast future growth in traffic volumes along this section of the highway. These projects began in 2024 (Stage 1) for the realignment and roundabout, and 2026 for the Rolleston overpass. These projects are expected to be completed in December 2026 and December 2027, respectively.

== Exit list ==
Territorial authority	Location	km	Destination	Notes
Christchurch City	Addington	8	SH 76 east (Brougham Street) – City Centre, Lyttelton	Christchurch Southern Motorway begins
Christchurch City	Addington	8	Barrington Street – Addington, Barrington, Cashmere	
Christchurch City	Middleton	11	SH 73 (Curletts Road) – Upper Riccarton, Airport, West Coast; SH 75 (Curletts Road) – Halswell, Akaroa	
Christchurch City	Hornby South	15	Halswell Junction Road	Eastbound entrance and westbound exit
Selwyn District	Prebbleton		Shands Road – Hornby, Airport	
Selwyn District	Templeton		SH 1 north (Main South Road) – Templeton, Picton	Westbound entrance and eastbound exit
Selwyn District	Templeton		Berketts Road	Southbound exit and entrance
Selwyn District	Rolleston		Weedons Road – Rolleston, West Melton, Lincoln	
Selwyn District	Rolleston		SH 1 south (Main South Road) – Timaru	Christchurch Southern Motorway ends
1.000 mi = 1.609 km; 1.000 km = 0.621 mi
