= Woolston, New Zealand =

Suburb of Christchurch, New Zealand

Woolston
- Suburb
- The Old Woolston Post Office
- Interactive map of Woolston
- Coordinates: 43°33′S 172°41′E
- Country: New Zealand
- City: Christchurch
- Local authority: Christchurch City Council
- Electoral ward: Linwood; Heathcote
- Community board: Waitai Coastal-Burwood-Linwood; Waihoro Spreydon-Cashmere-Heathcote

Area
  - Land: 636 ha (1,570 acres)

Population (June 2025)
  - Total: 11,120
  - Density: 1,750/km^{2} (4,530/sq mi)

| Phillipstown | Linwood | Bromley |
| Waltham | Woolston | Ferrymead |
| Hillsborough | Port Hills | Heathcote Valley |

Woolston is an industrial and residential suburb of Christchurch in the South Island of New Zealand. It is situated 3 kilometres (1.9 miles) southeast of the city centre, close to major arterial routes including State Highways 74 and 76 to Banks Peninsula. The Heathcote River flows through the suburb.

Woolston became a district in 1882, and remained a self-governing borough until November 1921, when it was amalgamated with Christchurch. Over the 20th century the area grew to become the centre of the New Zealand rubber industry. Woolston's population predominantly consists of European New Zealanders.

== History ==
In pre-European times, Woolston was not formally identified. The mudflats at Ferrymead at the eastern end of modern Woolston was considered an important food gathering place by the local Ngāi Tahu iwi. The Māori name for the mudflats was "Ohika paruparu". Māori women gathered shellfish there. This is the only name known to have been used to describe the area prior to European settlement.

Early European records name the western area of Woolston as Roimata, meaning teardrop in Māori. To this day some land titles in this area reference Roimata as their location. More recently the name has been revived by the Roimata Community Incorporated Society (Roimata Community Inc.) and Christ Church Roimata (an independent Anglican church), which are geographically and community-based organisations actively working in Roimata. Its boundaries are defined as Ensors Road, Brougham Street, Ferry Road and Richardson Terrace.

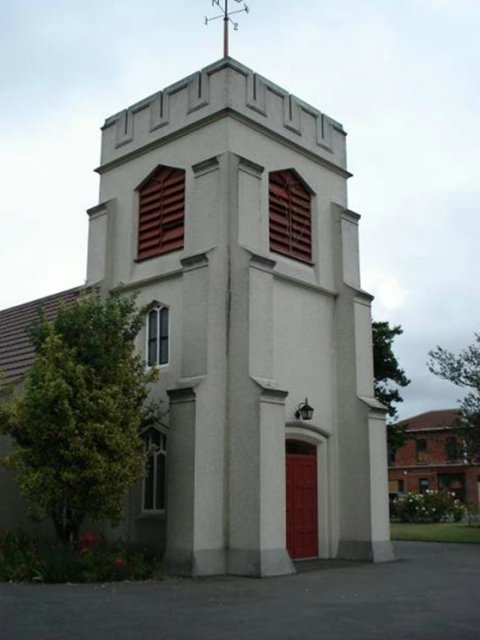
The bell tower, St John the Evangelist Woolston

One of the first signs of a growing European community in the Woolston area was the establishment of a Christian church, the Anglican Parish of St John the Evangelist Woolston, which belongs to the Christchurch diocese. The origins of the Parish date back to 1857 when the first Cob Church was built on the current site. In 1882 a new timber church was built. In 1960 the existing concrete Church building was built and dedicated (consecrated 1963). These church buildings are used daily for worship and many other religious and community activities. It is open to the public on Sundays. It is situated on Ferry Road at the eastern end of Woolston Village. The Parish was officially recognised one year after Christchurch was officially recognised as a City in 1856, the same year that the Anglican Diocese of Christchurch was established. St Johns is one of the oldest Anglican parishes in New Zealand.

Woolston initially belonged to the Heathcote County Council. In the 1850s and 1860s, wharves along the Ōpāwaho / Heathcote River were used by small ships to service the area. Before the Lyttelton Rail Tunnel was opened in 1867, all the incoming trade arrived in Ferrymead and was transported through Woolston (along Ferry Road) into Christchurch. The road went from the wharf in Lower Heathcote to what is now the corner of High and Madras Streets. The area became quite industrialised after the tunnel opened. Ferry Road later carried the tramlines to Sumner.

Up until early 1870 the area was commonly referred to as Lower Heathcote. At a meeting about the Heathcote Road drain a local store owner, Joseph Harry Hopkins (1837–1910), named the area Woolston after his birthplace Woolston in Southampton, England. On 16 June 1870, in response to a petition to the postmaster-general, Julius Vogel, objecting to the post office being called Ferry Road, the name Woolston was gazetted. Woolston became a district in 1882, and remained a self-governing borough until November 1921, when it was amalgamated with Christchurch.

Evangelical leader William Orange was born at Woolston in 1889.

=== Woolston Cut ===
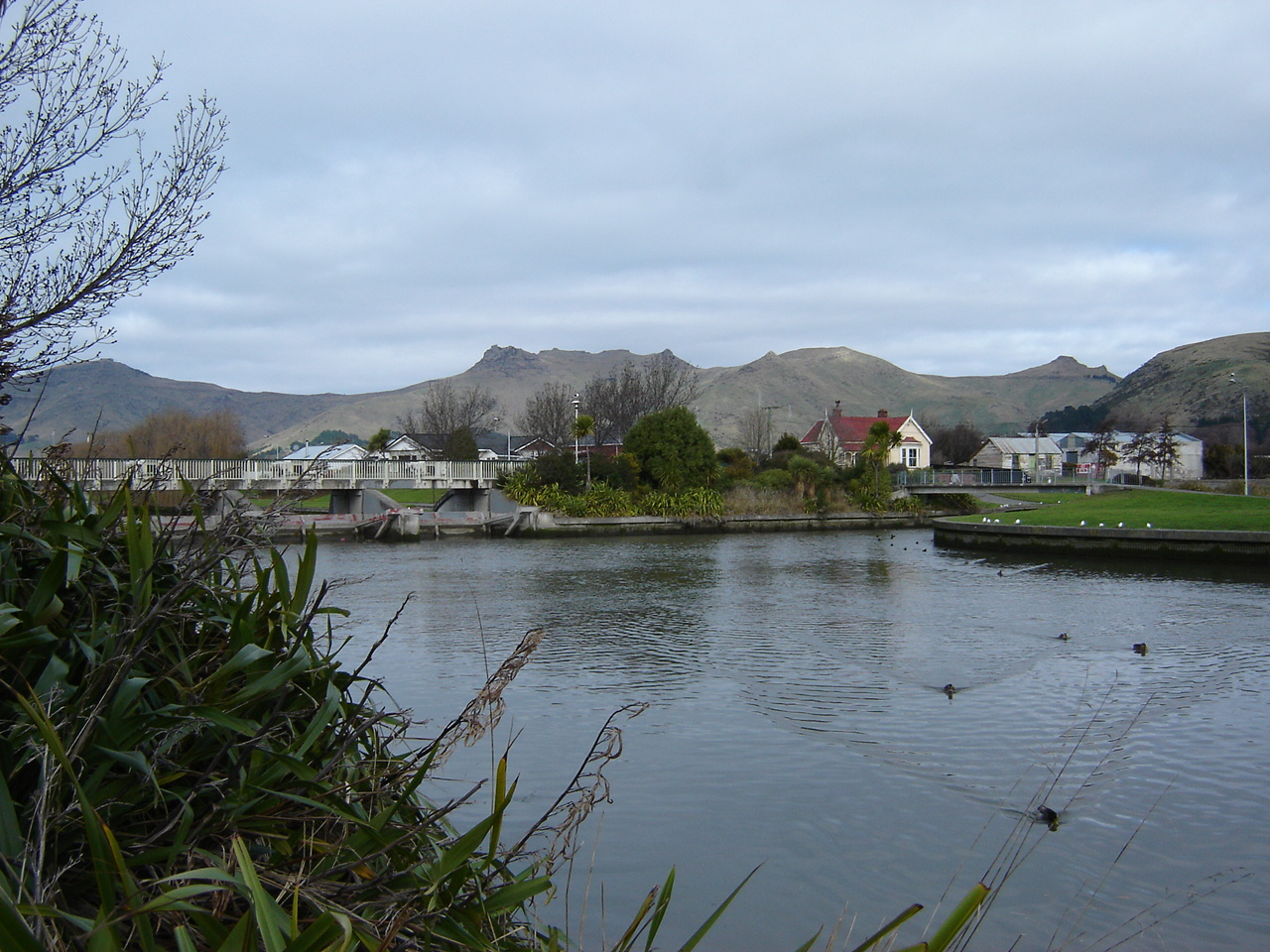
The Woolston Tidal Barrage and the Woolston Cut

The Ōpāwaho / Heathcote River provided Woolston much needed water for industries like wool scouring, which needed plentiful water. In 1966 the Woolston industrial sewer was built, and up until that time the river had become increasingly polluted.

Flooding had also become a problem and in 1986 the Woolston Cut began to allow flood waters to bypass a long loop of the river. This resulted in effluent from the surrounding government settlements to pollute this stretch of river. The 510 metres (1,670 ft) long project, which cost NZ$2m, had as a consequence that the trees on the riverbank died as far upstream as the Opawa bridge, and that banks collapsed. During normal flow regimes, the Heathcote remains to flow through what is called the Woolston Loop.

== Today ==
Union Wharf memorial bollard in Catherine Street, Woolston

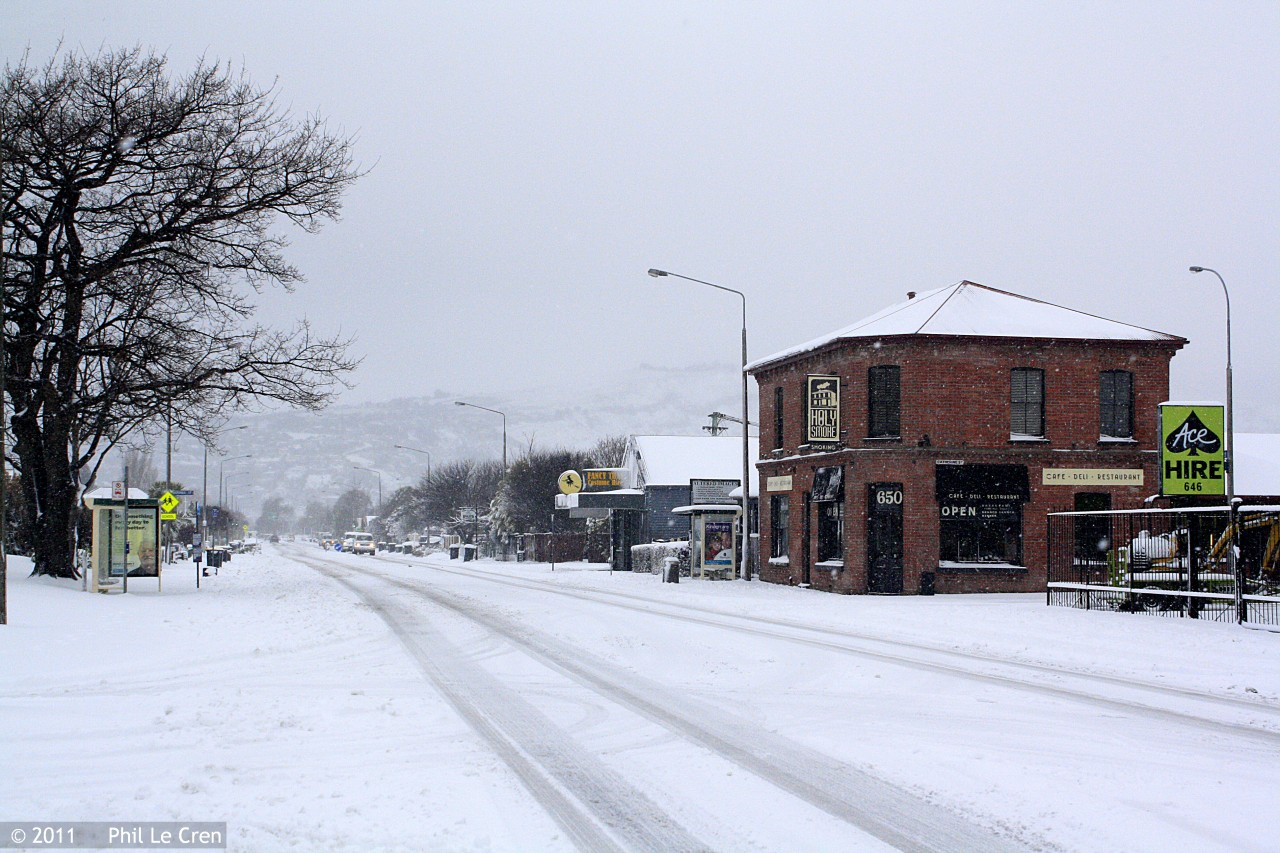
Woolston during the 2011 New Zealand snowstorms

In later years Woolston's close proximity to the Lyttelton rail line continued to sustain Woolston as a prime location for industry. Over the 20th century the area grew to become the centre of the New Zealand rubber industry. Other industries grew here and included a nugget factory and a gelatine and glue works. Many of these businesses are still present in one form or another. Woolston hosts Christchurch's largest container terminal.

Residential growth from the city gradually moved out through the Woolston area and it is now well merged with Christchurch City. Te Ara, the online Encyclopedia of New Zealand, states that "Factory workers living nearby gave Woolston a strong working-class identity."

Woolston is home to The Woolston Drivebys, an indoor football team. The Woolston Brass Band, established in 1891, has gained a national reputation and has won many competitions.

=== Heritage buildings ===
Prior to the February 2011 Christchurch earthquake, the following heritage buildings were listed with the New Zealand Historic Places Trust:

- A & T Burt building, the former Nugget Boot Polish Factory (Category II), built in 1924, it was damaged beyond repair in the February 2011 earthquake and demolished later that year.
- Bloomsbury (Category II), a large residential building at 37 Maunsell Street.
- Jubilee Hospital (Category I), a hospital for the old and infirm established in 1888 in the Woolston Loop. It closed in 1990 and some of the buildings were demolished. The remaining buildings house a fish processing plant.
- Stone Cottage (Category II), built in 1863 from Port Hills stone and these days used as Dizzy Lizzy's restaurant and catering service.
- Whalebone Cottage (Category II), built in ca 1867. Whale ribs used to form an arched gateway for over a century, but those bones are no longer there.
- Woolston Borough Monument (Category II), a monument from 1893.

== Demographics ==
Woolston comprises five statistical areas. Woolston North, West and East and Ensors are primarily residential. Woolston South is primarily industrial.

Individual statistical areas
| Name | Area (km^{2}) | Population | Density (per km^{2}) | Dwellings | Median age | Median income |
|---|---|---|---|---|---|---|
| Woolston North | 1.30 | 3,408 | 2,622 | 1,365 | 38.4 years | $35,000 |
| Ensors | 0.87 | 2,340 | 2,690 | 984 | 35.9 years | $38,800 |
| Woolston West | 0.51 | 1,158 | 2,271 | 477 | 36.3 years | $38,400 |
| Woolston East | 1.28 | 3,201 | 2,501 | 1,347 | 40.5 years | $33,000 |
| Woolston South | 2.40 | 492 | 205 | 234 | 40.6 years | $42,000 |
| New Zealand | | | | | 38.1 years | $41,500 |

=== Residential areas ===
The residential areas of Woolston cover 3.96 km^{2} (1.53 sq mi). They had an estimated population of 10,600 as of June 2025, with a population density of 2,677 people per km^{2}.

Historical population for residential areas
| Year | Pop. | ±% p.a. |
|---|---|---|
| 2006 | 9,489 | — |
| 2013 | 9,816 | +0.49% |
| 2018 | 10,131 | +0.63% |
| 2023 | 10,107 | −0.05% |

The residential areas had a population of 10,107 in the 2023 New Zealand census, a decrease of 24 people (−0.2%) since the 2018 census, and an increase of 291 people (3.0%) since the 2013 census. There were 5,052 males, 4,962 females, and 96 people of other genders in 4,173 dwellings. 5.1% of people identified as LGBTIQ+. There were 1,725 people (17.1%) aged under 15 years, 1,941 (19.2%) aged 15 to 29, 4,779 (47.3%) aged 30 to 64, and 1,659 (16.4%) aged 65 or older.

People could identify as more than one ethnicity. The results were 76.8% European (Pākehā); 17.6% Māori; 7.7% Pasifika; 11.8% Asian; 1.6% Middle Eastern, Latin American and African New Zealanders (MELAA); and 2.2% other, which includes people giving their ethnicity as "New Zealander". English was spoken by 96.2%, Māori by 4.2%, Samoan by 2.7%, and other languages by 12.1%. No language could be spoken by 2.2% (e.g. too young to talk). New Zealand Sign Language was known by 0.9%. The percentage of people born overseas was 22.2, compared with 28.8% nationally.

Religious affiliations were 29.5% Christian, 1.7% Hindu, 1.1% Islam, 0.6% Māori religious beliefs, 0.8% Buddhist, 1.0% New Age, and 2.4% other religions. People who answered that they had no religion were 55.7%, and 7.3% of people did not answer the census question.

Of those at least 15 years old, 1,548 (18.5%) people had a bachelor's or higher degree, 4,224 (50.4%) had a post-high school certificate or diploma, and 2,613 (31.2%) people exclusively held high school qualifications. 390 people (4.7%) earned over $100,000 compared to 12.1% nationally. The employment status of those at least 15 was 4,068 (48.5%) full-time, 1,110 (13.2%) part-time, and 267 (3.2%) unemployed.

=== Woolston South ===
Woolston South covers 2.40 km^{2} (0.93 sq mi). It had an estimated population of 520 as of June 2025, with a population density of 217 people per km^{2}.

Historical population for Woolston South
| Year | Pop. | ±% p.a. |
|---|---|---|
| 2006 | 474 | — |
| 2013 | 519 | +1.30% |
| 2018 | 507 | −0.47% |
| 2023 | 492 | −0.60% |

Woolston South had a population of 492 in the 2023 New Zealand census, a decrease of 15 people (−3.0%) since the 2018 census, and a decrease of 27 people (−5.2%) since the 2013 census. There were 264 males, 222 females, and 3 people of other genders in 234 dwellings. 6.7% of people identified as LGBTIQ+. The median age was 40.6 years (compared with 38.1 years nationally). There were 66 people (13.4%) aged under 15 years, 90 (18.3%) aged 15 to 29, 261 (53.0%) aged 30 to 64, and 75 (15.2%) aged 65 or older.

People could identify as more than one ethnicity. The results were 73.2% European (Pākehā); 13.4% Māori; 5.5% Pasifika; 12.8% Asian; 1.8% Middle Eastern, Latin American and African New Zealanders (MELAA); and 3.7% other, which includes people giving their ethnicity as "New Zealander". English was spoken by 96.3%, Māori by 3.7%, Samoan by 3.7%, and other languages by 12.2%. No language could be spoken by 1.8% (e.g. too young to talk). New Zealand Sign Language was known by 1.2%. The percentage of people born overseas was 24.4, compared with 28.8% nationally.

Religious affiliations were 27.4% Christian, 2.4% Hindu, 1.2% Māori religious beliefs, 1.2% Buddhist, 1.2% New Age, and 1.2% other religions. People who answered that they had no religion were 57.9%, and 7.9% of people did not answer the census question.

Of those at least 15 years old, 84 (19.7%) people had a bachelor's or higher degree, 231 (54.2%) had a post-high school certificate or diploma, and 108 (25.4%) people exclusively held high school qualifications. The median income was $42,000, compared with $41,500 nationally. 21 people (4.9%) earned over $100,000 compared to 12.1% nationally. The employment status of those at least 15 was 231 (54.2%) full-time, 51 (12.0%) part-time, and 9 (2.1%) unemployed.

== Economy ==
The Tannery was established in Woolston in 2013. It features 60 stores including a cinema complex.

== Education ==
Ngutuawa School and Te Waka Unua School are full primary schools for years 1 to 8. They have rolls of 136 and 494 students, respectively. Ngutuawa started as Bamford School in 1952. It was damaged in the Christchurch earthquakes, and moved to a new site with the new name in 2020. Te Waka Unua opened in 2015 after the merger of Phillipstown School with Woolston School.

St Anne's Catholic School and Tamariki School are state-integrated full primary schools for years 1 to 8. They have rolls of 179 and 49 students, respectively. St Anne's was established in 1906. Tamariki opened in 1966. It provides education following the principles of A. S. Neill. Kimihia Parents' College is a Teen Parent Unit of Linwood College. All these schools except Kimihia are coeducational. Rolls are as of July 2026.
