= Lyttelton road tunnel =

Road tunnel in Christchurch, New Zealand

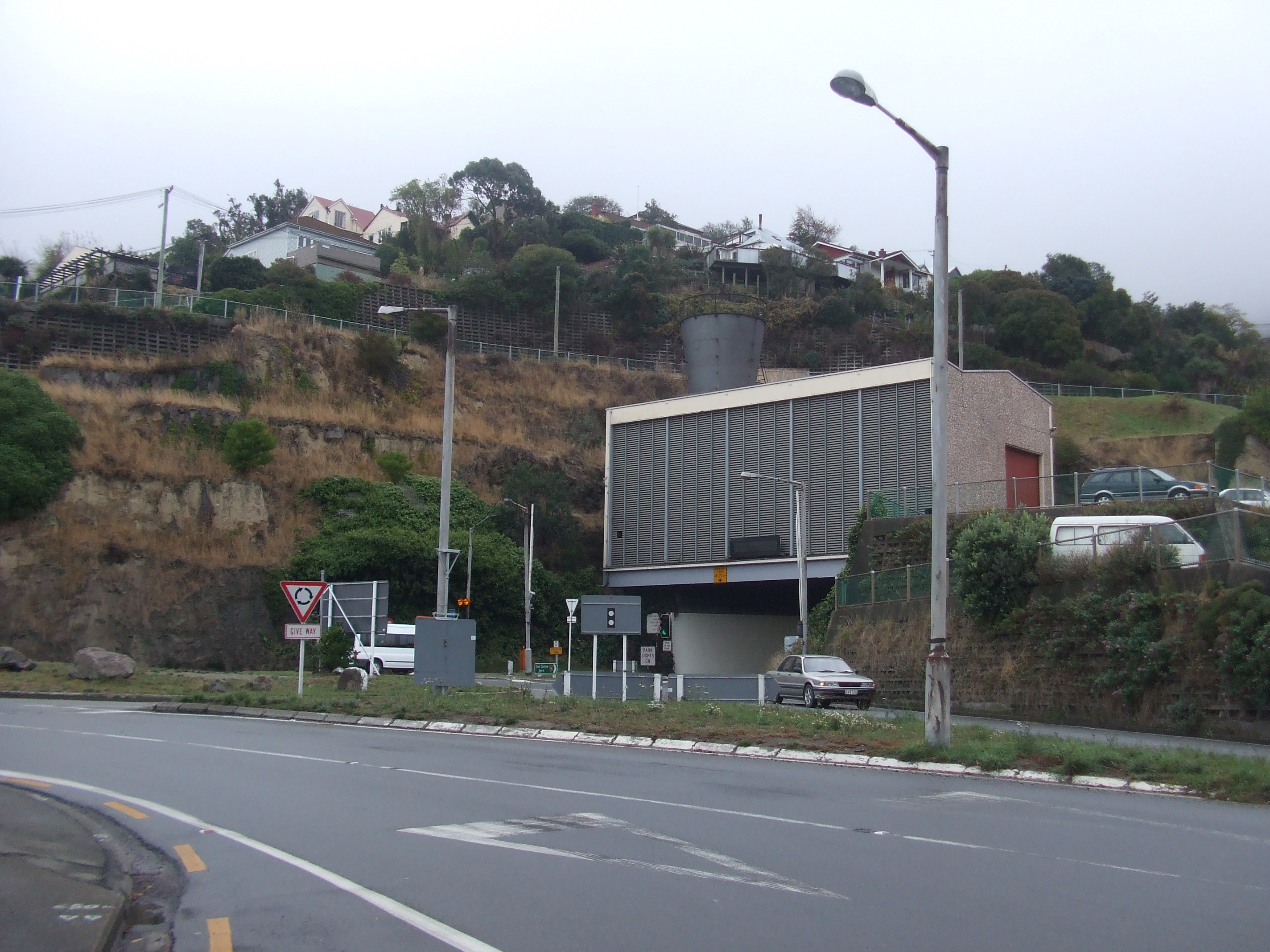
- The Lyttelton tunnel portal at the southern end
- Interactive map of Lyttelton road tunnel

Overview
- Location: Christchurch
- Coordinates: 43.5942°S 172.7116°E
- Status: Open
- Route: Christchurch–Lyttelton Motorway

Operation
- Opened: 27 February 1964
- Owner: NZ Transport Agency Waka Kotahi
- Traffic: 10,755 (2010)
- Toll: nil

Technical
- Length: 1,970 metres (6,460 ft)
- No. of lanes: two
- Operating speed: 50 km/h

The Lyttelton road tunnel runs through the Port Hills to connect the New Zealand city of Christchurch and its seaport, Lyttelton. It opened in on 27 February 1964 and carries just over 10,000 vehicles per day as part of State Highway 74.

At 1,970 metres (6,460 ft), it was the longest road tunnel in New Zealand from its opening until 2 July 2017, when it was superseded by the Waterview Tunnels.

While the tunnel itself was not damaged due to the February 2011 Christchurch earthquake, the Heathcote tunnel canopy was destroyed. The nearby Tunnel Control Building — a Category I heritage building – suffered significant damage and was closed, before finally being demolished in 2013. Construction of a new control building was completed in 2014.

== History ==
=== Early settler efforts ===
When the first Europeans settled in Canterbury in the 1850s with no deepwater ports available other than on Banks Peninsula, they had to transport their produce from the plains to Heathcote, near Sumner. From there it was taken by longboat and lighter around Lyttelton Heads to ships waiting in Lyttelton harbour. The only other route was via the Bridle Path that was constructed in 1850 and was used by the early European settlers as a route from the port to new settlements on the northern side of the Port Hills. Although very steep, it was the only means of traversing the hills. In 1851 a Select Committee enquired into the best means of access to the sea. Among the options a road tunnel was considered and rejected, one reason being that horses would catch cold coming from the hot plains into a cold tunnel. Instead a road via Evans Pass which is near the eastern end of the Port Hills, was selected to connect Sumner and Lyttelton, and was completed in 1857 at a cost of £30,000.

The Evan's Pass soon proved unsatisfactory as the transportation needs of the province increased, which lead to the construction of the rail tunnel which linked Lyttelton and Christchurch by 1867. At this time, Canterbury's total population was only 10,000.

Two more road links, steeper and longer than the first, have been built; one which reaches Lyttelton via Dyers Pass by way of the head Lyttelton harbour at Governor's Bay, and an even longer one through Gebbie's Pass. In spite of its length, valuable heavy transport had to sometimes use Gebbie's Pass as frosts in winter could made the other two roads unsafe.

=== Alternative options ===
The introduction of motor vehicles to New Zealand highlighted the need for a better road connection. Two alternatives, a road tunnel or canal, became the subject of considerable argument. In 1919 the Australian firm of Smith, Timms and Kidman offered to construct a road tunnel in three years for £700,000 or about £624,000 if the proposed tramline was eliminated, but the scheme lapsed.

By 1920 the Christchurch-Lyttelton Tunnel Road League (which by 1922 had become the Port and City League) had been established to push for the building of a tunnel.

There was also a Port Christchurch League which advocated for a port at the estuary of the Heathcote and Avon rivers. Sir Joseph Ward, Prime Minister and Minister of Railways in 1929, arranged a Government grant of £1,000 to the Port and City League, to set up a commission to investigate the matter provided; a similar sum was raised by the League. This was regarded by the League as a significant gesture of official backing. The resulting "Direct Access to the Sea Commission" concluded in July 1930 that they could not recommend the adoption of the proposals for either a road tunnel or a port at Christchurch as this would cause "serious hardship to traders and the farming community".

The Canterbury Chamber of Commerce campaigned through the 1930s and 1940s for a road tunnel but without success until 1944, when Bill MacGibbon (deputy chairman of the Lyttelton Harbour Board and prominent in the movement to build a tunnel) was able to convince the New Zealand government to allow the Ministry of Works to prepare plans.

In April 1937, a conference convened by Canterbury Chamber of Commerce with the support of the Prime Minister Michael Savage, which had 28 public bodies in attendance, made a recommendation for the construction of a road tunnel. The advent of the Second World War, however, put a stop to all but essential construction projects. In 1943, a conference attended by 19 public bodies resulted in the establishment of a Tunnel Road Promotion Committee. In 1944 the Minister of Works, Bob Semple, met deputations from both the Tunnel Road Promotion Committee and the Canal League. He considered that the canal scheme, then estimated to cost £5,000,000, had no hope of success, whereas he was very favourably impressed with the road tunnel scheme, then estimated to cost £750,000.

Progress was still slow though in June 1949 a Gazette notice was issued authorising the construction of a motorway as a tunnel road. This was followed in 1952 by a survey defining the limits of the land required.

=== Establishment of the Road Tunnel Authority ===
The years following the end of the Second World War saw no further progress until in 1953 Sidney Holland, the member of parliament for Fendalton in Christchurch and also more critically prime minister, sponsored the Christchurch-Lyttelton Road Tunnel Bill, which established a seven-man authority to construct and control a road tunnel with authority to raise the raise loan, construct the tunnel and pay back the loan by levying tolls. The bill was subsequently passed into law in October 1956 with the Government guarantying the repayment of any loans raised by the Road Tunnel Authority.

By 1956 the MOW estimated the project would cost £2.515 million. The Ministry of Works and Development (MOW) were appointed as consulting engineers to the Road Tunnel Authority; with the assistance of the Civil Engineering Department of Canterbury University they began the design of the road tunnel. A drilling programme was carried out in the proposed portal areas to locate bedrock. Various options were considered with an early tunnel design having a width of 37 ft (11 m), consisting of a 24 ft (7.3 m) wide roadway with a 5 ft 6 in (1.68 m) wide cycle track on either side. As the cycle tracks were estimated to raise the cost by £500,000 they were dropped. The final design called for a 24 ft (7.3 m) wide roadway with 2 ft (0.61 m) wide kerbs on either side for use by maintenance personnel and to assist in keeping motor vehicles from scrapping the tunnel walls.

Following discussions about the route and the width of the tunnel which allowed finalisation of the estimated cost the newly created Road Tunnel Authority under the chairmanship of Bill MacGibbon (ca. 1891 – 1962) applied to the Local Authorities Loans Board in 1959 for approval to raise a loan, only for it to be turned down. The reason given was that if the planned new harbour facilities at Lyttelton were not available before the tunnel opened then there would be insufficient freight moving through the tunnel in its early years to generate the toll revenue need to service the loan. After the sending of a deputation to the Prime Minister (Walter Nash) and the Minister of Finance (Arnold Nordmeyer) and then a written assurance from the Road Tunnel Authority that the tunnel would not be completed prior to the completion of the harbour upgrades, approval was given in March 1960 for the raising of a loan of £3,250,000. So far £2,652,330 had been raised, most of it in parcels at 4.875% and 5%.

=== Call for tenders ===
With the design and specifications completed by August 1960 the MOW called for tenders to undertake the project, which as a result of their detailed design they estimated would cost £3,500,000. The contract called for the work to be priced on linear footage basis, which put the onus on the contract bidders to determine the likely ground conditions, which would impact on how long it would take to dig the tunnel. Fortunately, the records from the construction of the rail tunnel between 1861 and 1867 were still available.

Tenders were received in January 1961 for building the tunnel from seven companies, the prices varying from £1,770,431 to £3,774,117, with all but two being a combination of a New Zealand contractor and an international contractor. As the Road Tunnel Authority had reserved the right to tile the tunnel surfaces if funds permitted, it decided to exercise this option and awarded a £1,947,748 contract which included tiling of the tunnel on 28 January 1961 to the lowest bidder, a 60/40 joint venture of New Zealand-owned Fletcher Construction and Kaiser Engineers and Constructors of the United States of America.

In addition, a motorway was to be built from Ferry Road to the Heathcote Underpass near the Heathcote portal, a distance of some 2 1/2 miles (5 km). This required the construction of bridges over the Ōpāwaho / Heathcote River and the Lyttelton railway line, an interchange and underpass system at the bottom of Horotane Valley. This work cost approximately £530,000 and was paid for by the National Roads Board.

=== Construction ===
The contract specified the project had to be completed within three years, irrespective of whether the tunnel was fully lined with tiles or not. With it expected to take six months to import the equipment and material and establish on site, then allowing nine months at the end of the schedule to tile the tunnel, Fletcher-Kaiser's project manager Jack (J.G.) Smith estimated they only had 21 months to dig and concrete the tunnel. Whereas the law had previously required that when digging tunnels that all workings were opened from each end and that no internal combustion engines could be used within the tunnel, the 1960 Quarries Act allowed a diesel engine fitted with scrubbers to be used and had no requirement for the workings to be open end to end. Having identified that it was more advantageous than digging from Lyttelton, Fletchers-Kaiser dug the tunnel from the Heathcote end. Fletcher-Kaiser employed Burnett Motors of Ashburton and Isaac Construction of Christchurch to excavate the 1 1/4-mile-long (2 km) approach road to the tunnel from the nearest road at the bottom of the Heathcote valley.

Work on digging the tunnel had been underway for a month with 180 ft (55 m) excavated by the time the ceremonial 'firing of the first shot' to officially signal work on the tunnel took place on 9 September 1961.

Within a short time the tunnel was progressing at a rate of 23.2 ft (7.1 m) per day, working three shifts, six days a week. The tunnellers received a basic hourly wage of 7s −2d per hour. Despite the use of water exhaust scrubbers on the diesel-powered excavation equipment it was still found necessary improve the ventilation by locating near the rock face two 200 hp 5 ft 6 in diameter fans capable of exhausting 100,000 cubic feet per hour via a flexible 6 ft (1.8 m) diameter flexible plastic pipe to the portal. Although by the time the tunnel having reached the 60% point it was found that the clearing of flumes and smoke was becoming a problem. Despite the use of several auxiliary fans it was found necessary to drive a small 7 ft (2.1 m) by 4 ft (1.2 m) ventilation tunnel for the Lyttelton end to connect with the main heading. Once the connection had been made at the 1,160 ft (350 m) from the Heathcote end one of the main ventilation fans was moved to the Lyttelton end. Despite the cost of driving the ventilation tunnel, it was found that it speeded up the driving of the main tunnel by allowing a more effective cutting, reducing the amount of explosives being used and more quickly clearing the smoke and flumes after blasting.

It was found necessary to support with steel framework only 8% of the tunnel due to unstable ground conditions. In all other areas, either rock bolts or a combination of steel mesh and sprayed concrete were used to restrain potential loose rock. A total of 1,400 rock bolts were used.

Despite being delayed by wet weather at the start of the work the excavation of the tunnel was completed on 18 August 1962, within both the time and budget. Work moved to concreting the interior of the tunnel. Concrete for the tunnel was supplied from a temporary concrete mixing plant established by Certified Concrete on a rail siding 2 mi (3.22 km) from the tunnel portal. A minimum of four agitator trucks conveyed concrete from the plant to the tunnel. Over 45,000 cubic yards (34,405 cubic metres) of concrete were placed within the tunnel with a further 4,500 cubic yards (3,440 cubic metres) placed outside. After the tunnel's concrete walls had been sandblasted they were lined with 306,000 sq ft of tiles imported from overseas using a newly invented epoxy glue made by Fletcher industries using technology sourced from the Australian company of A C Horn. Ventilation buildings were constructed at both ends of the tunnel in each of which were located one fresh-air and one exhaust fan, both 12 ft (3.7 m) in diameter.

The final price awarded to Fletchers and Kaiser including all variations was £2,112,542, 8.5% above the original contract award though it took four years before the Road Tunnel Authority paid it all.

By the time the purchase of property, construction of the Lyttelton Tunnel Control Building, the consultant's fee of the Ministry of Works and loan interest during construction were included the total cost (excluding the motorway) was £2.7 million.

=== Opening ===
On the first night that cars were allowed through the queue stretched from the tunnel, down Ferry Rd and into Barbadoes Street as far back as the Cathedral of the Blessed Sacrament in Christchurch.

When the tunnel officially opened on 27 February 1964 by Governor-General Sir Bernard Fergusson it was hailed by the local community as "the new gateway for the Port to the Plains" and a significant development in the history of the region.

The toll for private cars was initially set at 2/6 (two shillings and sixpence). It was lowered to two shillings on 1 October 1966, becoming 20 cents upon decimalisation on 10 July 1967. Tolls were raised to 30 cents on 1 April 1978, before being abolished a year later on 1 April 1979 by the Christchurch–Lyttelton Road Tunnel Authority Dissolution Act 1978.

=== Service history ===
The original Lyttelton Road Tunnel Administration Building, designed by Christchurch architect Peter Beaven, was a Category I listed heritage building and one of the youngest buildings recognised by the trust. Following its demolition as a result of damage sustained in the February 2011 Christchurch earthquake, a new control building, constructed to 180% of the Building Code to withstand future earthquakes, was completed in 2014 at a cost of $1.5 million.

As of 2010, the tunnel has an AADT (average daily traffic volume) of 10,755 vehicles/day, of which 12.3% are heavy goods vehicles.

== Incidents ==
In August 2008, the tunnel was closed to northbound traffic due a landslide in bad weather conditions. The tunnel was also closed temporarily following the 2010 Canterbury earthquake and subsequent aftershocks to allow for structural integrity inspections to take place. Service generally resumed within 20 minutes of each aftershock.

The tunnel was again closed following the February 2011 Christchurch earthquake. The tunnel canopy was severely damaged by rockfall and was demolished within days. Following initial engineers' inspection the tunnel reopened to emergency vehicles later the same day. Access was limited to Lyttelton residents only from 26 February before fully reopening. The Tunnel Control Building was also badly damaged and deemed unfit for occupation.

It was subsequently demolished in early 2013, and a new purpose-built Lyttelton Tunnel Control Building for managing the tunnel's operation and maintenance was constructed and completed in June 2014. A community celebration was held on 31 August 2014 to jointly open the new Lyttelton Tunnel Control Building and commemorate the tunnel's 50th anniversary. To manage the operation and maintenance of the tunnel the Lyttelton Road Tunnel Administration building designed by Christchurch architect Peter Beaven was constructed at the Heathcote end of the tunnel. The distinctive building was given a New Zealand Historic Places Trust Category 1 listing in 2008.

== Operation ==
Cyclists are not allowed to use the tunnel, although for many years they were allowed to pass through on one day a year. For example, the 2001 tunnel ride was held in conjunction with the 3rd NZ Cycling Conference. However, since 2007 Christchurch buses have been equipped with bicycle carriers to allow cyclists access between Heathcote and Lyttelton.

== Images ==
Lyttelton road tunnel

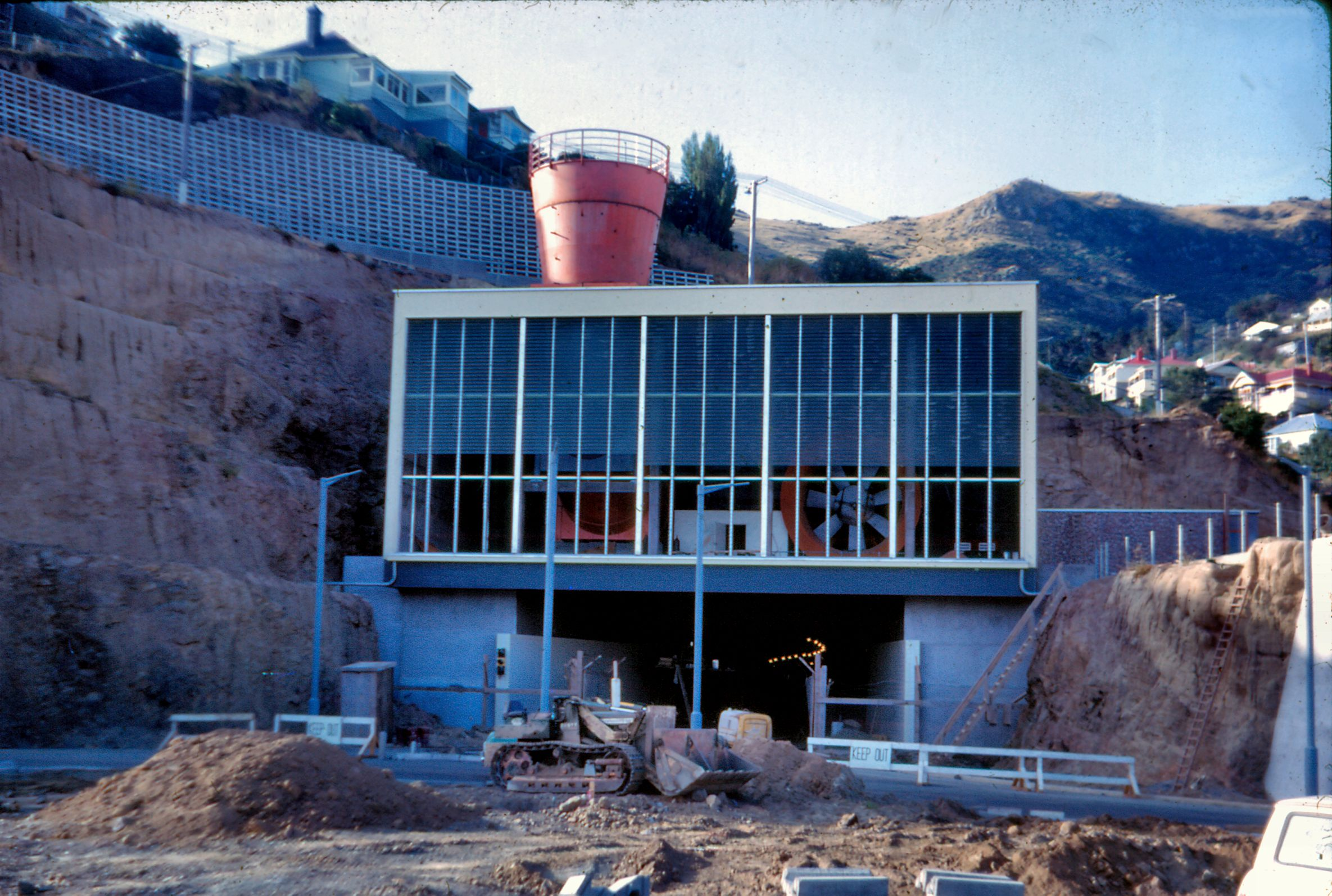
Southern (Lyttelton) portal of the Lyttelton road tunnel under construction in 1964

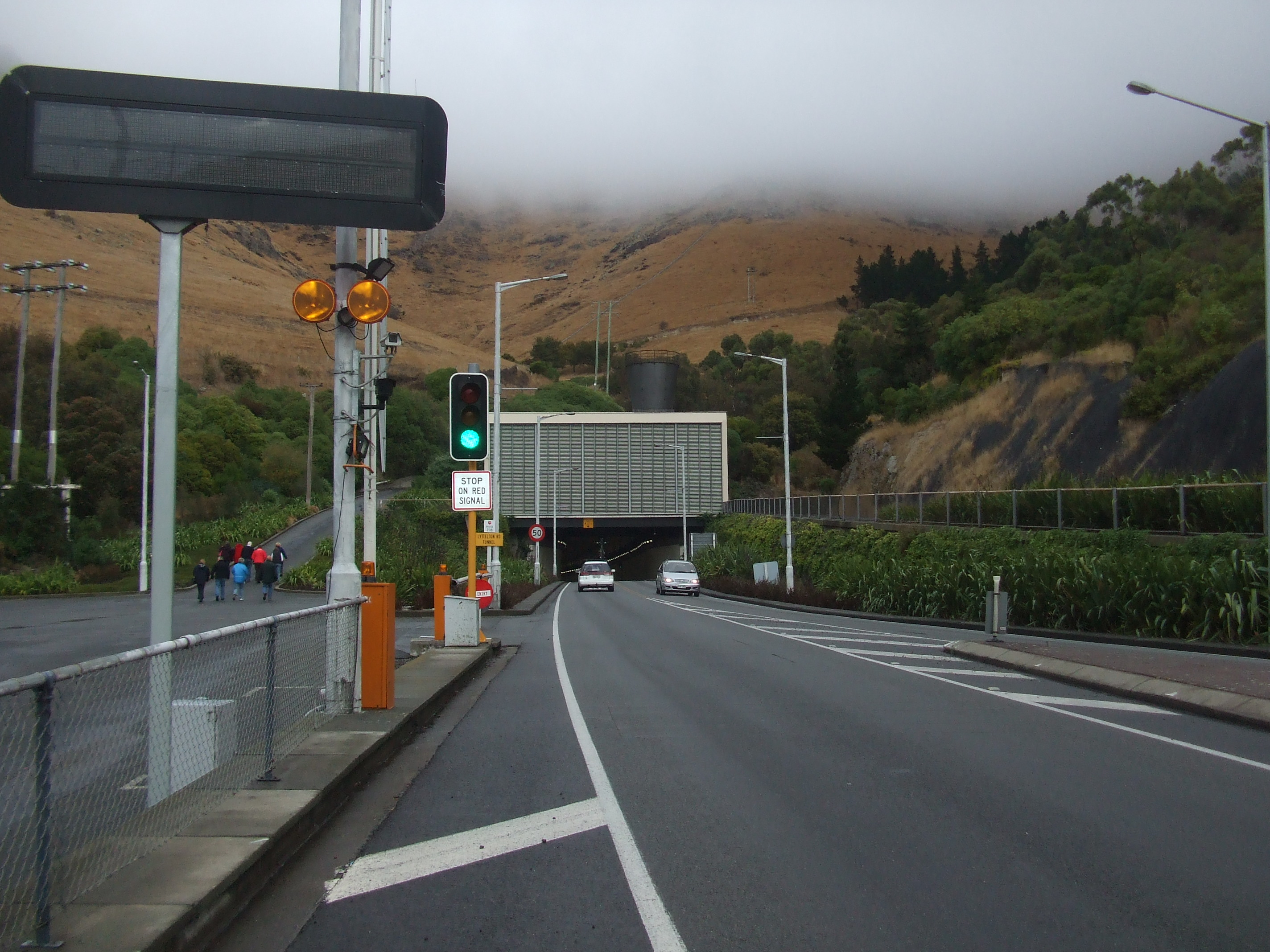
Northern (Heathcote) portal of the Lyttelton road tunnel in 2010

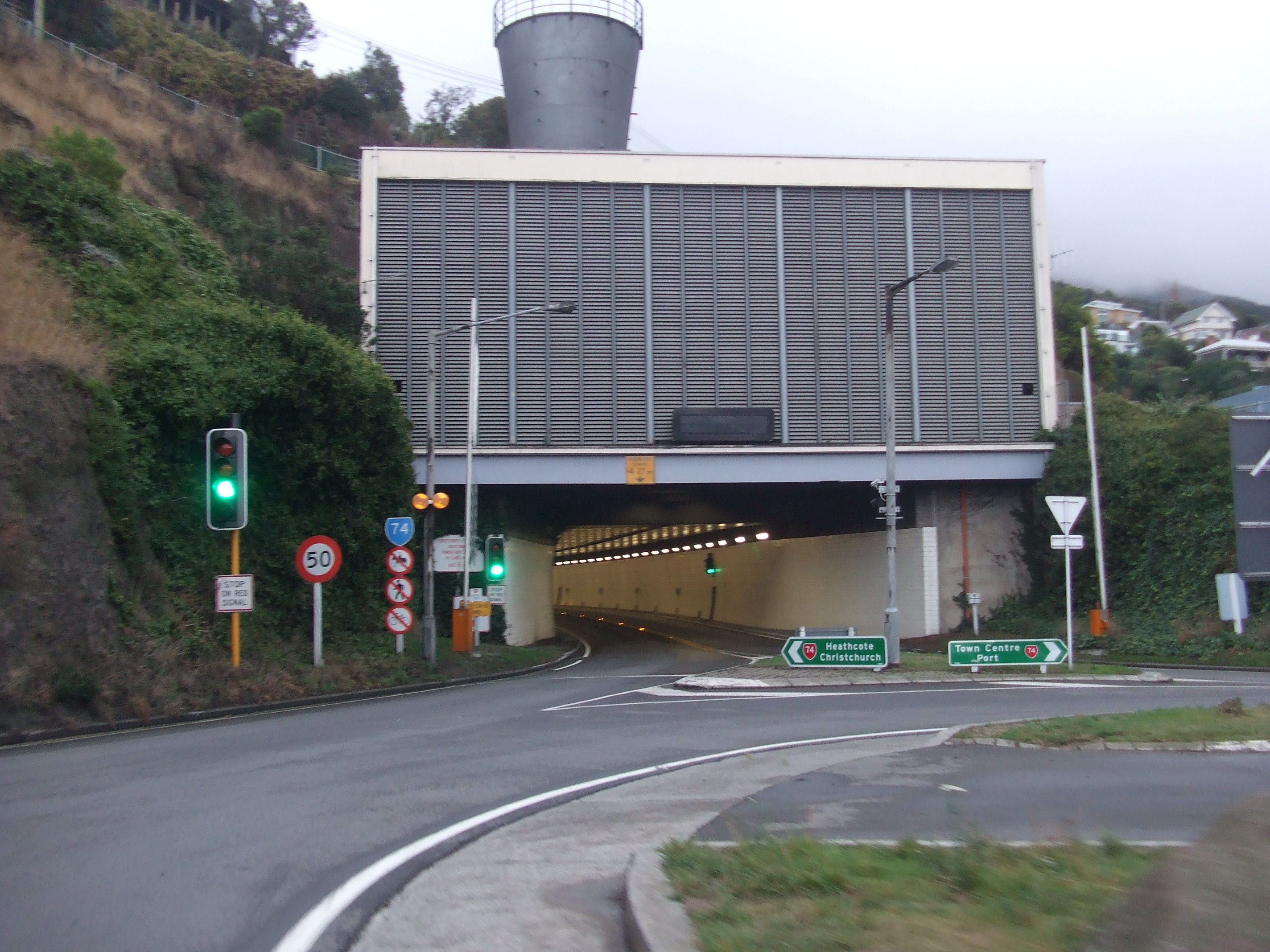
Southern (Lyttelton) portal of the Lyttelton road tunnel in 2010

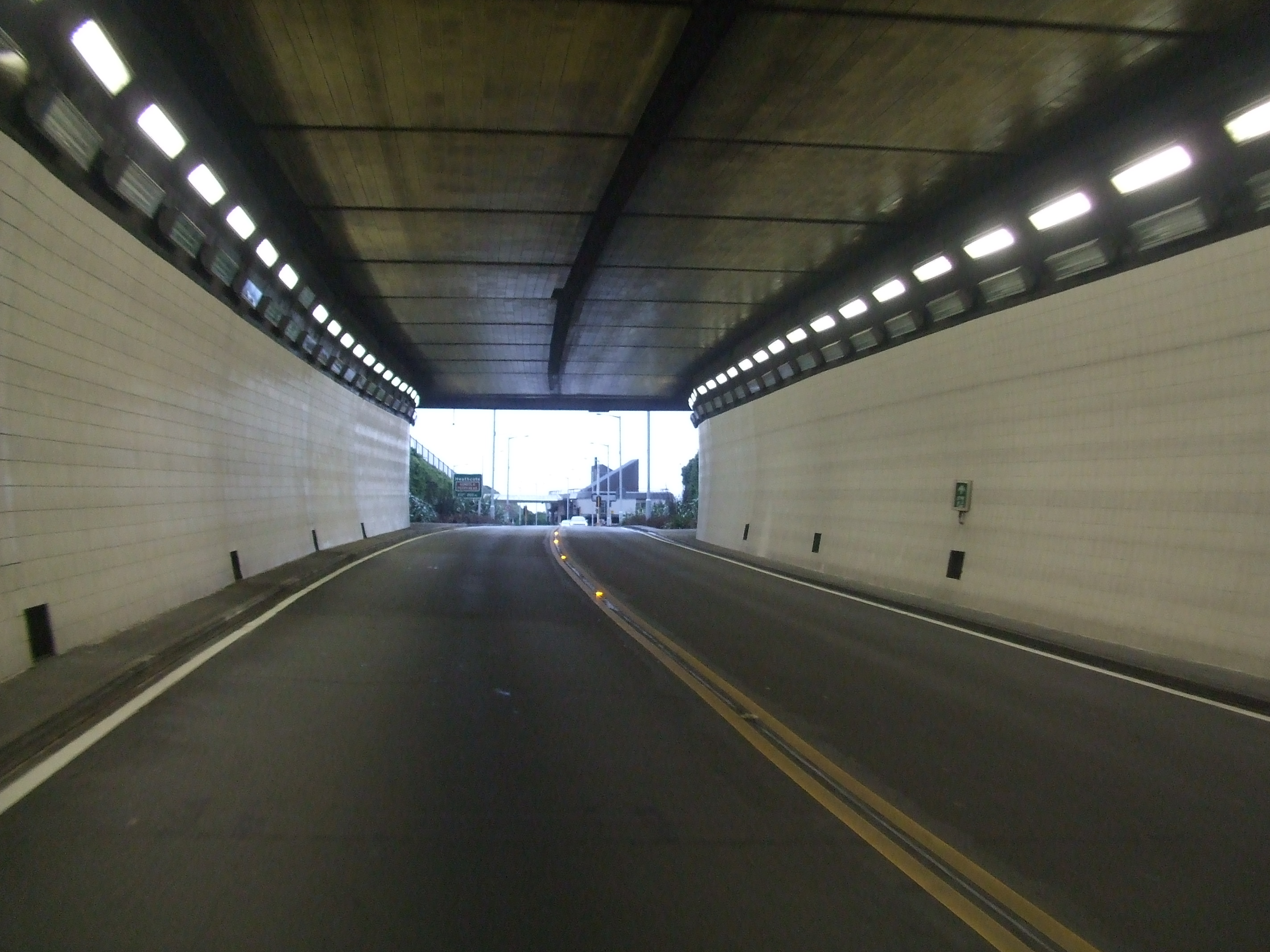
Inside Northern (Heathcote) portal of the Lyttelton road tunnel in 2010

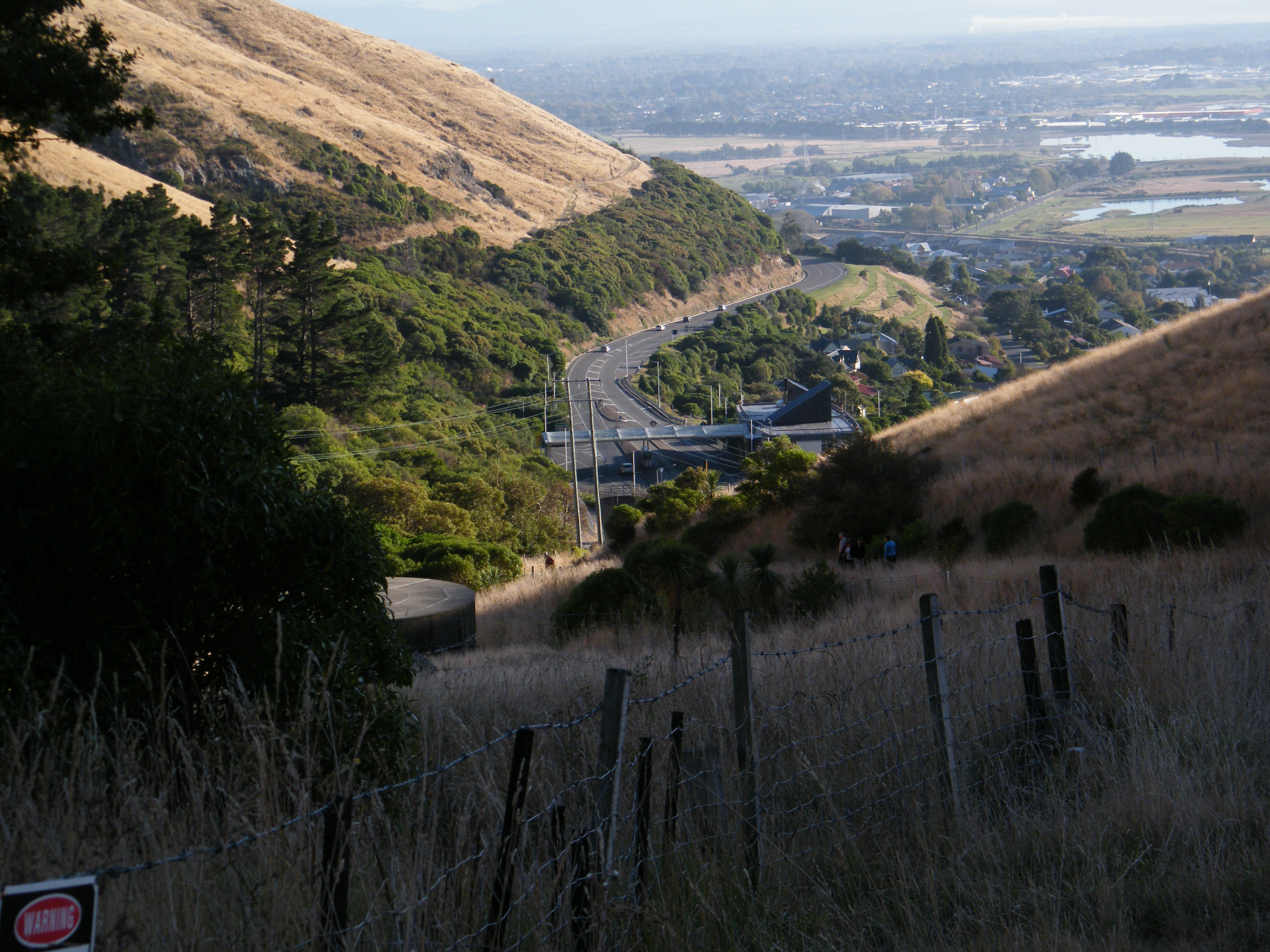
Northern portal from the Bridle Path, May 2010
