= Sydenham Heritage Church =

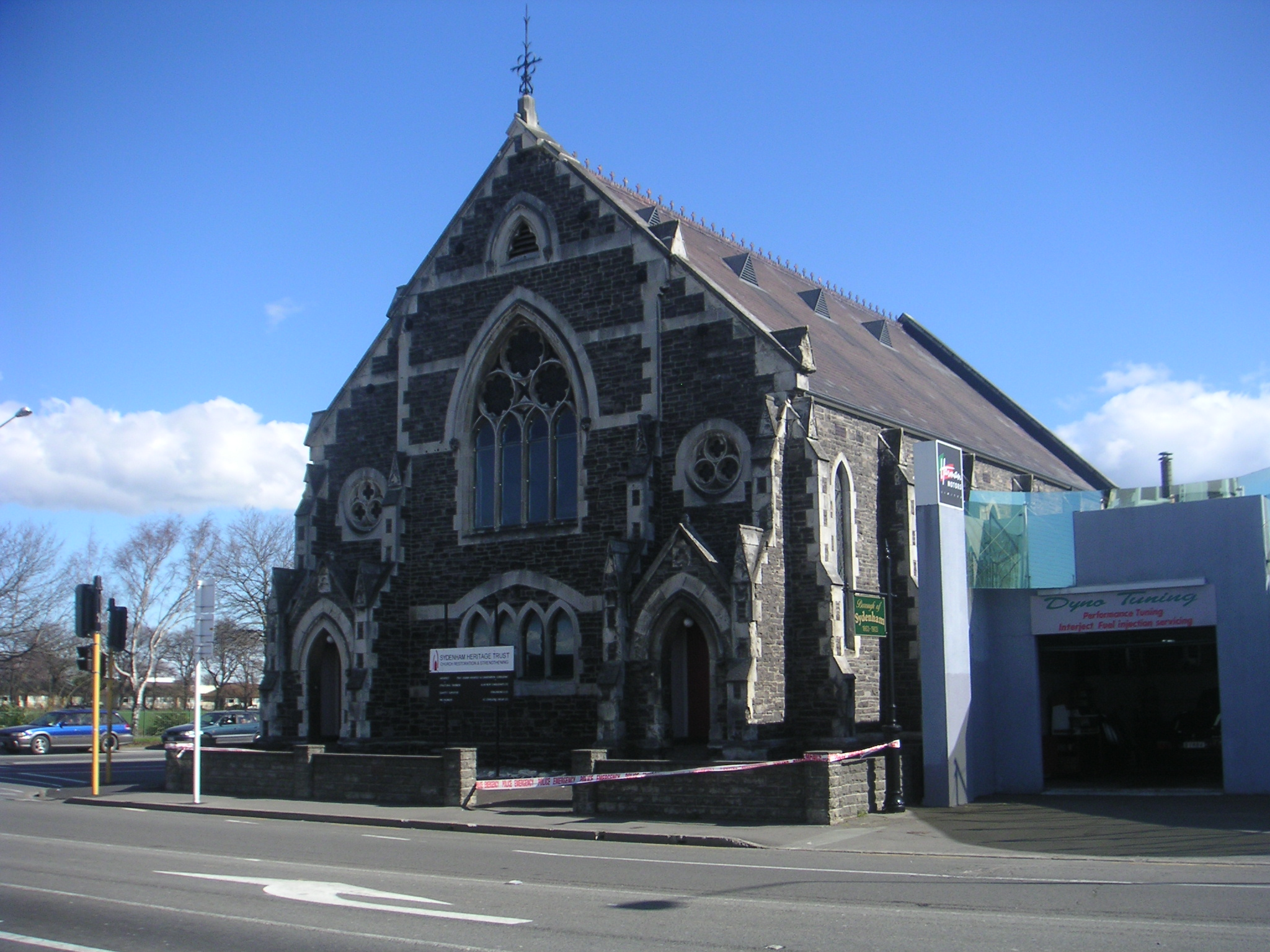
- Sydenham Heritage Church (6 September 2010)
- Sydenham Heritage Church
- 43.54730°S 172.63638°E
- Location: Sydenham, New Zealand
- Country: New Zealand

History
- Founded: 3 February 1878

Architecture
- Architect: Crouch and Wilson
- Style: Gothic Revival
- Demolished: February 2011

Sydenham Heritage Church, originally known as the Colombo Street Methodist Church or Colombo Street Wesleyan Church or Colombo Road Wesleyan Church was a heritage-listed stone church building located in Sydenham, an inner suburb Christchurch, New Zealand. It was registered as a "Historic Place – Category II" by the New Zealand Historic Places Trust.

== History ==
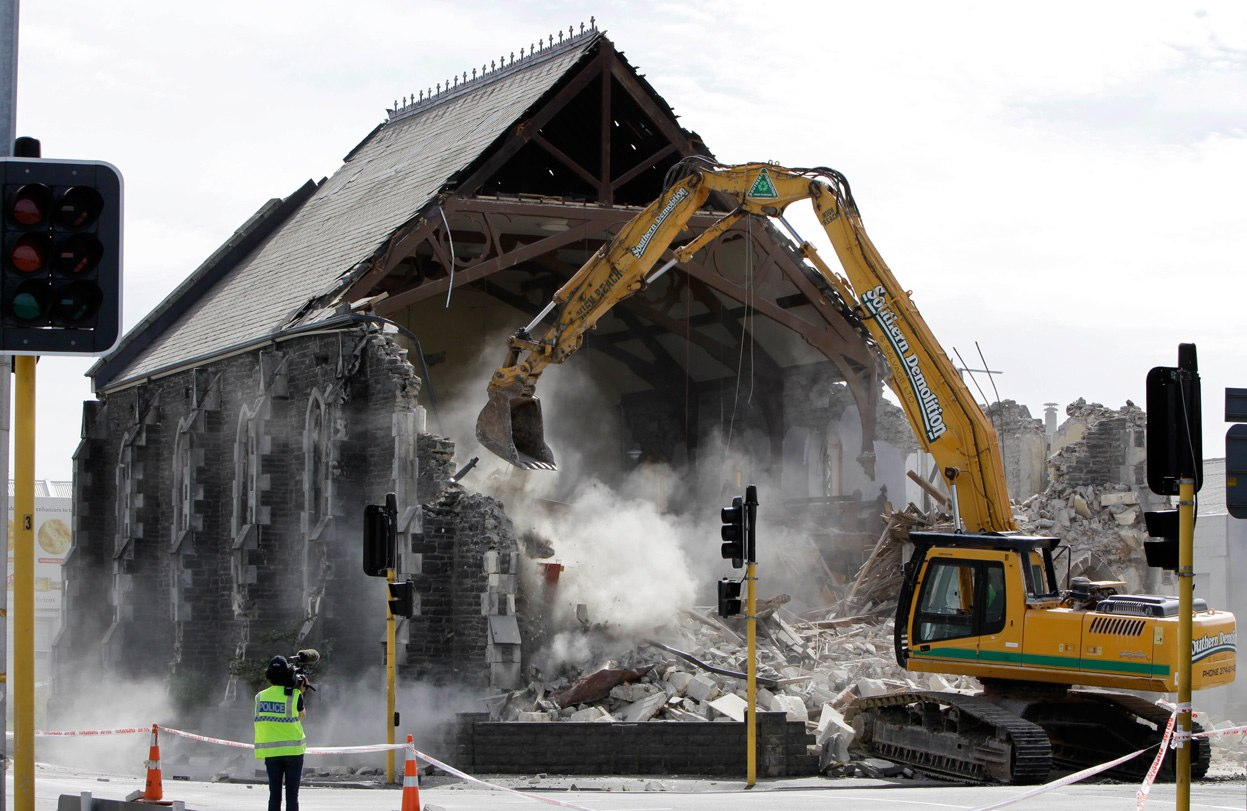
Sydenham Heritage Church demolition

Christchurch was mainly an Anglican settlement. The congregation of Methodists was small, but they had a significant presence. They built the first stone church in Canterbury in 1864, the Durham Street Methodist Church.

The growth of the congregation, mainly in the working class suburb of New Town (now called Sydenham), required another church. St James church was relocated from Montreal Street in the Christchurch Central City to one of the small streets of New Town. When it was decided to constitute Christchurch South as a separate circuit, and that St James was too small and poorly placed, a new site was sought. Land on Colombo Road was purchased, but it was exchanged in October 1876 for a larger section further south at the intersection of Colombo Road (since renamed as Colombo Street) and Pound Road (since renamed as Brougham Street).

The building was designed in the Gothic Revival style in 1877 by the Melbourne architectural firm of Crouch and Wilson who had earlier designed the Durham Street Methodist Church. Construction was supervised by local architect Thomas Lambert and the building was officially opened in February 1878.

With population in Sydenham declining due to industrialisation of the suburb during the 1960s, and with church attendance generally dropping, the church closed in 1971. The Seventh-day Adventist Church leased the building for a time, before it was sold to the Christian Congregational Church of Samoa. The Samoan congregation built a new church in Linwood in 1997 and a property developer applied for a demolition consent, which sparked a public outcry. The Samoan congregation sold the church to another developer in 1999, whose initial plans of conversion into apartments were changed in 2001 to a demolition consent. This was also withdrawn amidst community resentment.

The building was purchased in 2001 by the newly formed Sydenham Heritage Trust with the help of a Christchurch City Council interest free loan. Restoration and earthquake strengthening was an ongoing activity of the trust. The building was damaged in the February 2011 Christchurch earthquake. It was subsequently demolished by a demolition company without the knowledge or consent of the owners, and without authorisation from the Historic Places Trust, the council archaeologist (who approves demolition applications) or the National Civil Defence Controller (who oversees earthquake responses). A police complaint has been lodged, and an enquiry into the unauthorised demolition is likely. It subsequently emerged that the demolition had been sought and approved by Civil Defence, although approval of demolition was possibly in excess of its legal powers. After the rubble sat in the site for several years, it was removed in mid-2017.

== Heritage listing ==
On 24 June 2005, the building was registered as a Category II heritage item, with the registration number being 3137.

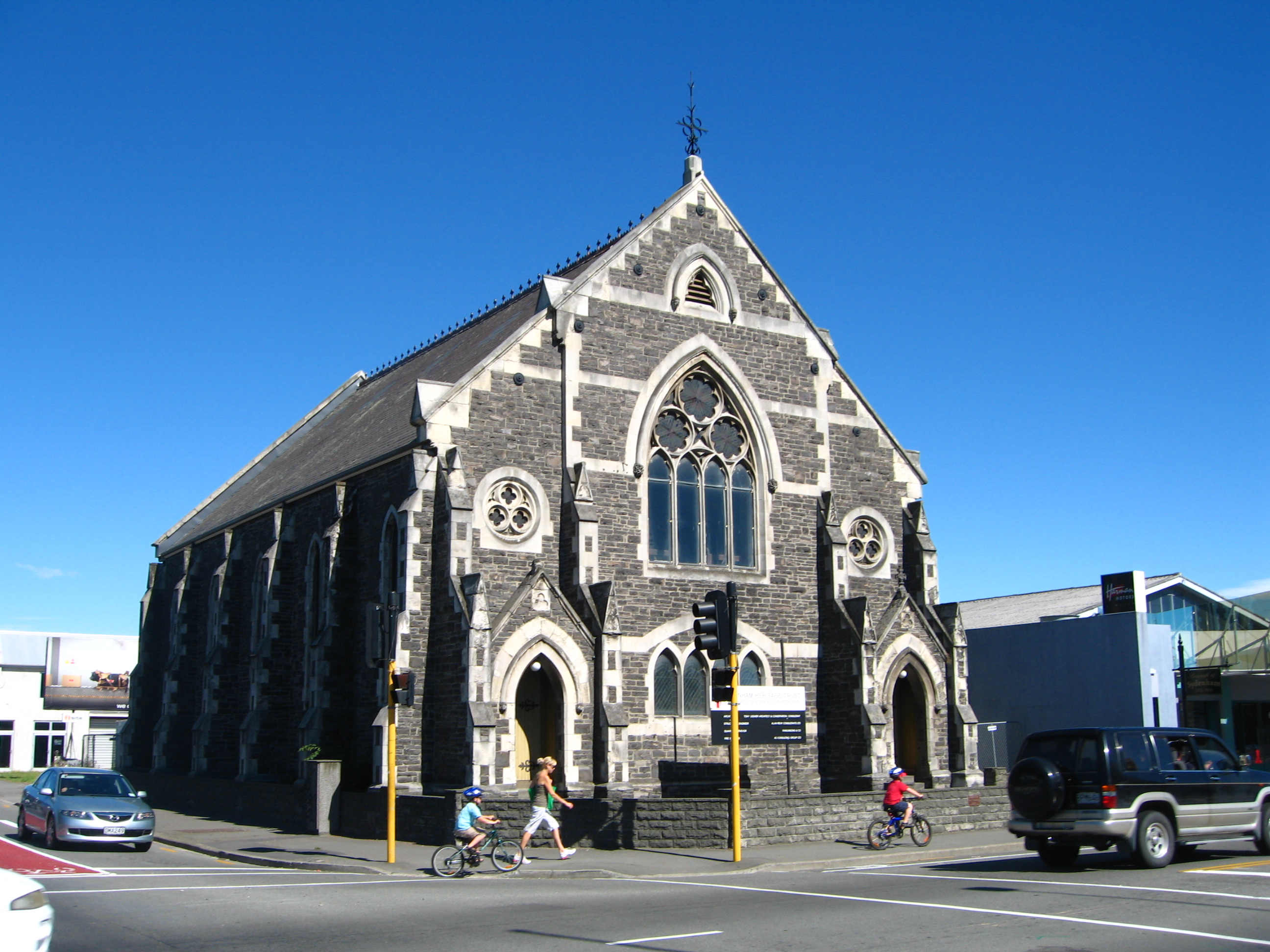
The church in 2008

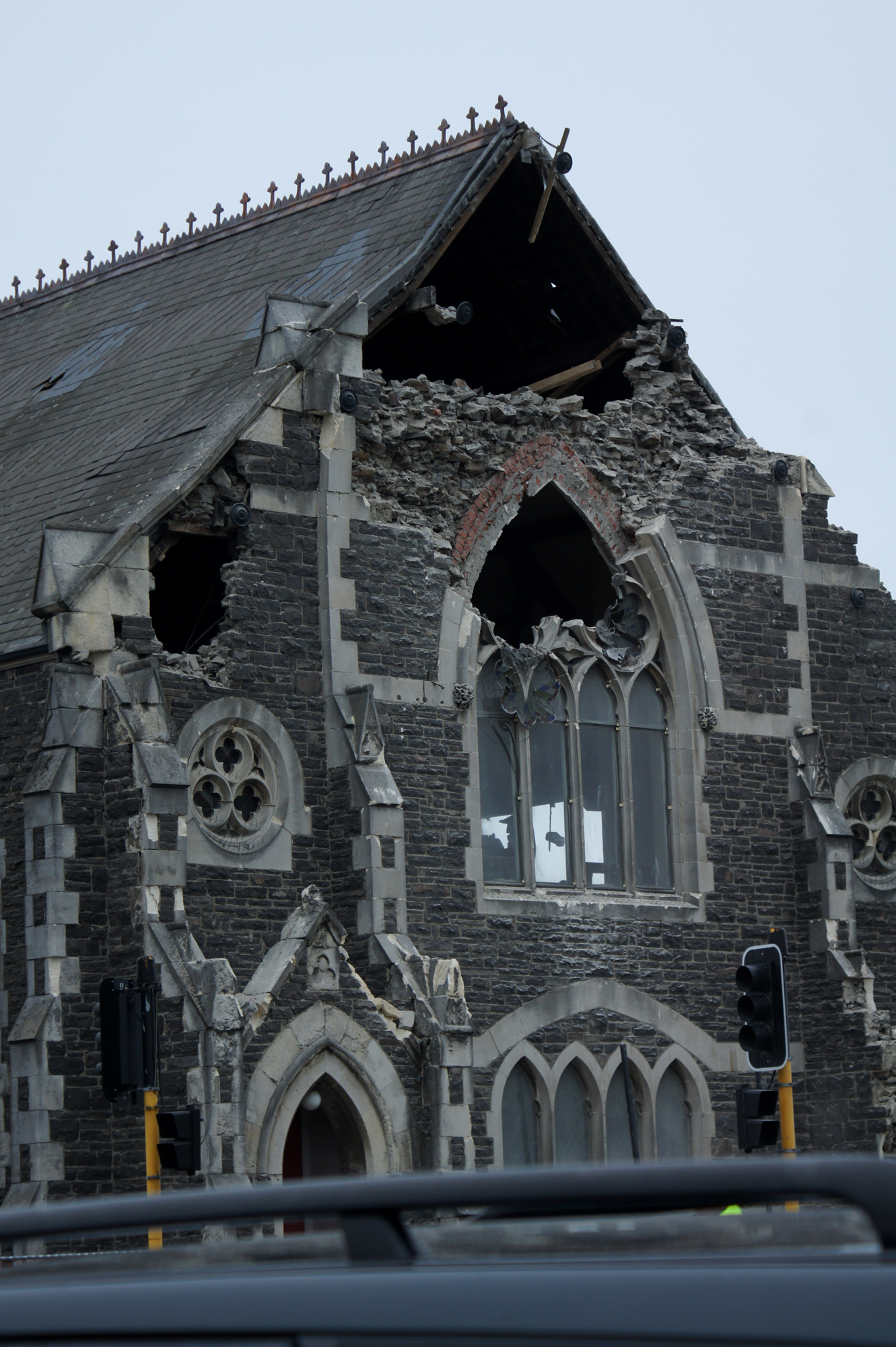
Quake damage

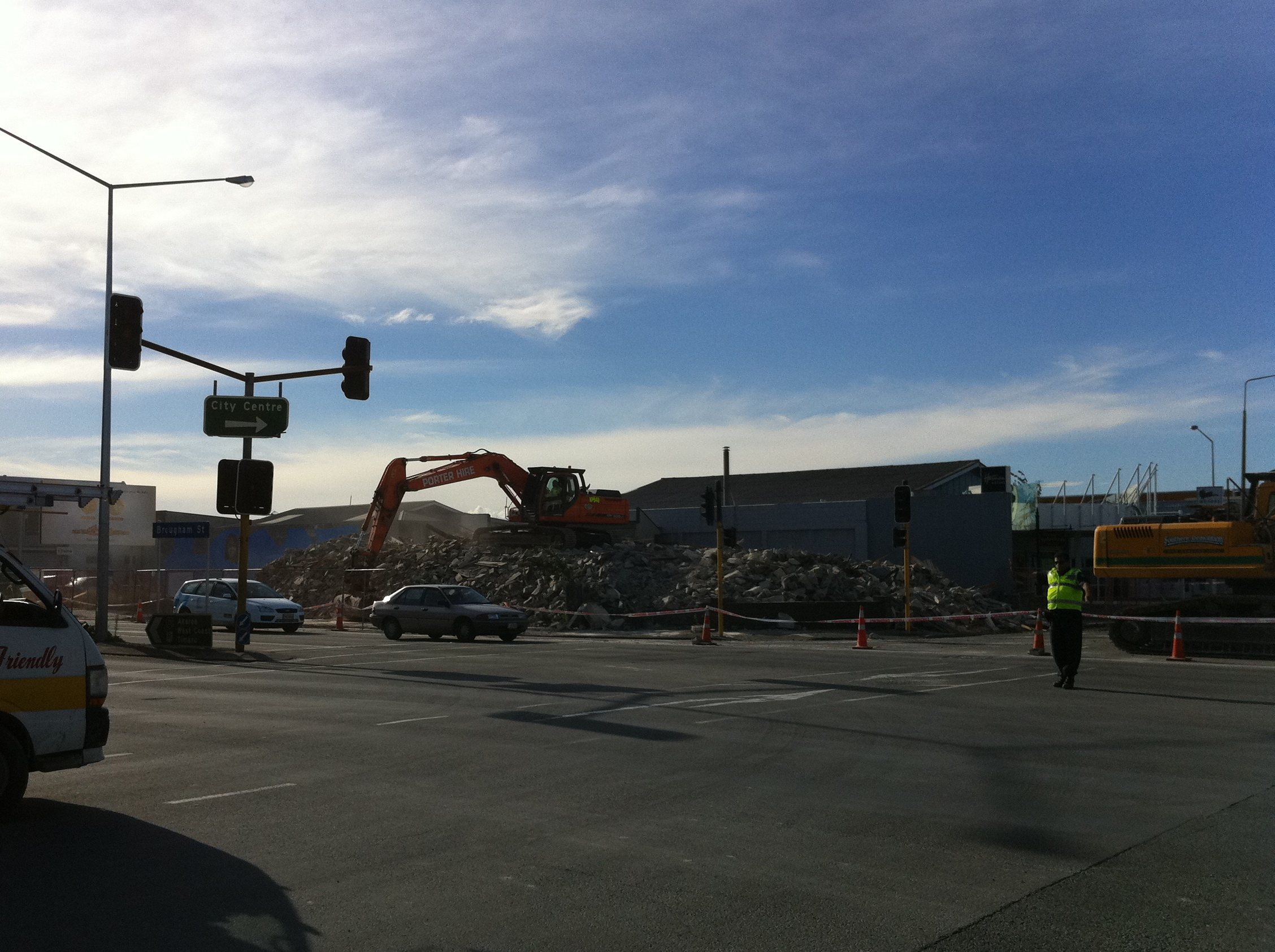
Post-demolition
