= Crouch and Wilson =

Crouch and Wilson was an architectural practice based in Melbourne, Australia in the late nineteenth century. The partnership, between Tasmanian-born Thomas Crouch and recently arrived Londoner Ralph Wilson, commenced in 1857 in Elizabeth Street. The firm designed numerous prominent Melbourne buildings including many Presbyterian and Wesleyan churches. After the deaths of the partners in the late 1880s, their sons continued on with the business until its closure in 1916.

== Selected works ==
- Prahran Town Hall, Chapel Street, Prahran,1861
- Longerenong Homestead, Longerenong, Victoria, 1862
- Durham Street Methodist Church, Christchurch, 1864
- Victorian School for the Deaf, St Kilda Road, 1866-71
- Royal Victorian Institute for the Blind, St Kilda Road, 1868
- Wesleyan Methodist Church, 209 Davey St, Hobart, 1870
- Chinese Mission Church, Little Bourke Street,1872
- Hawksburn Primary School, Malvern Road, Hawksburn, 1874
- Church Of The Immaculate Conception, Hawthorn, 1867.
- Colombo Street Methodist Church, Christchurch, New Zealand, 1877 (demolished)
- East Melbourne Synagogue, 1877
- Methodist Ladies' College, Hawthorn, 1882
- The Homeopathic Hospital (later Prince Henry's Hospital), St Kilda Road, (demolished),1882-4

== Gallery ==
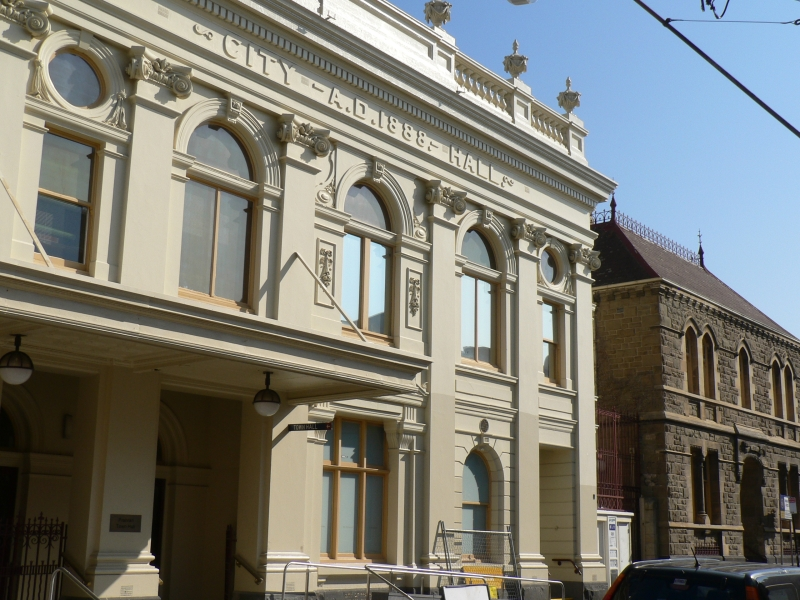
Prahran Town Hall

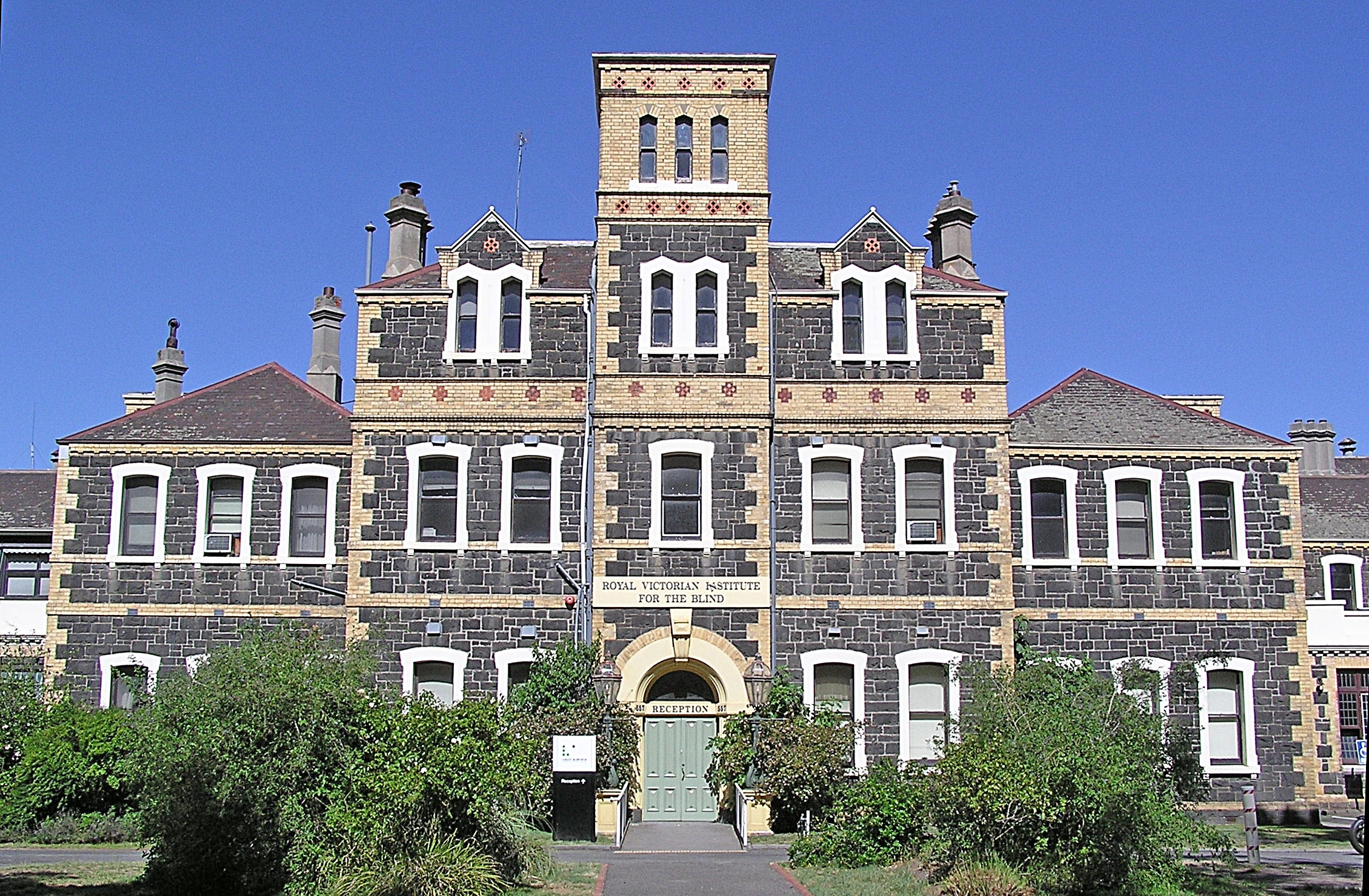
College for the Blind

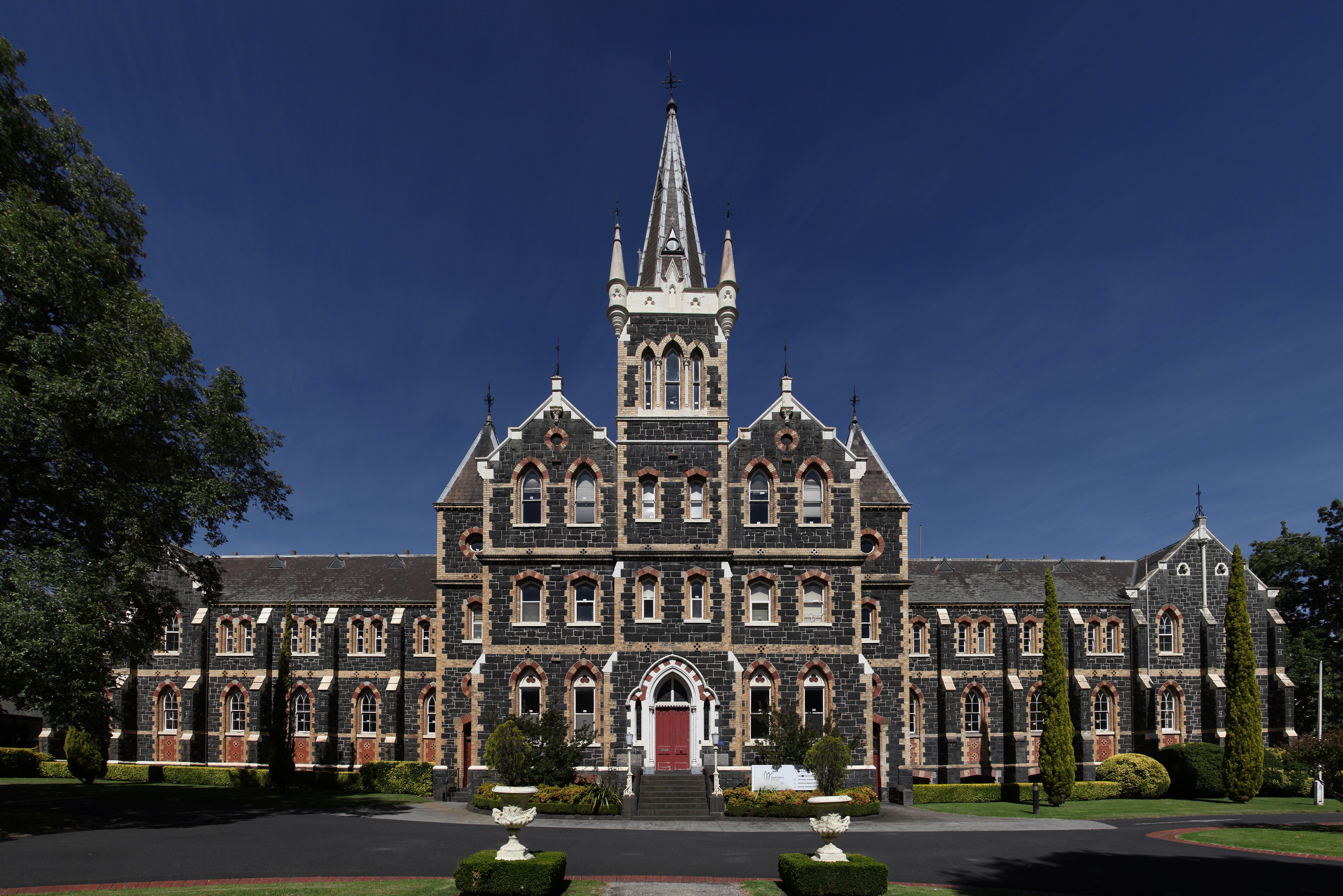
College for the Deaf

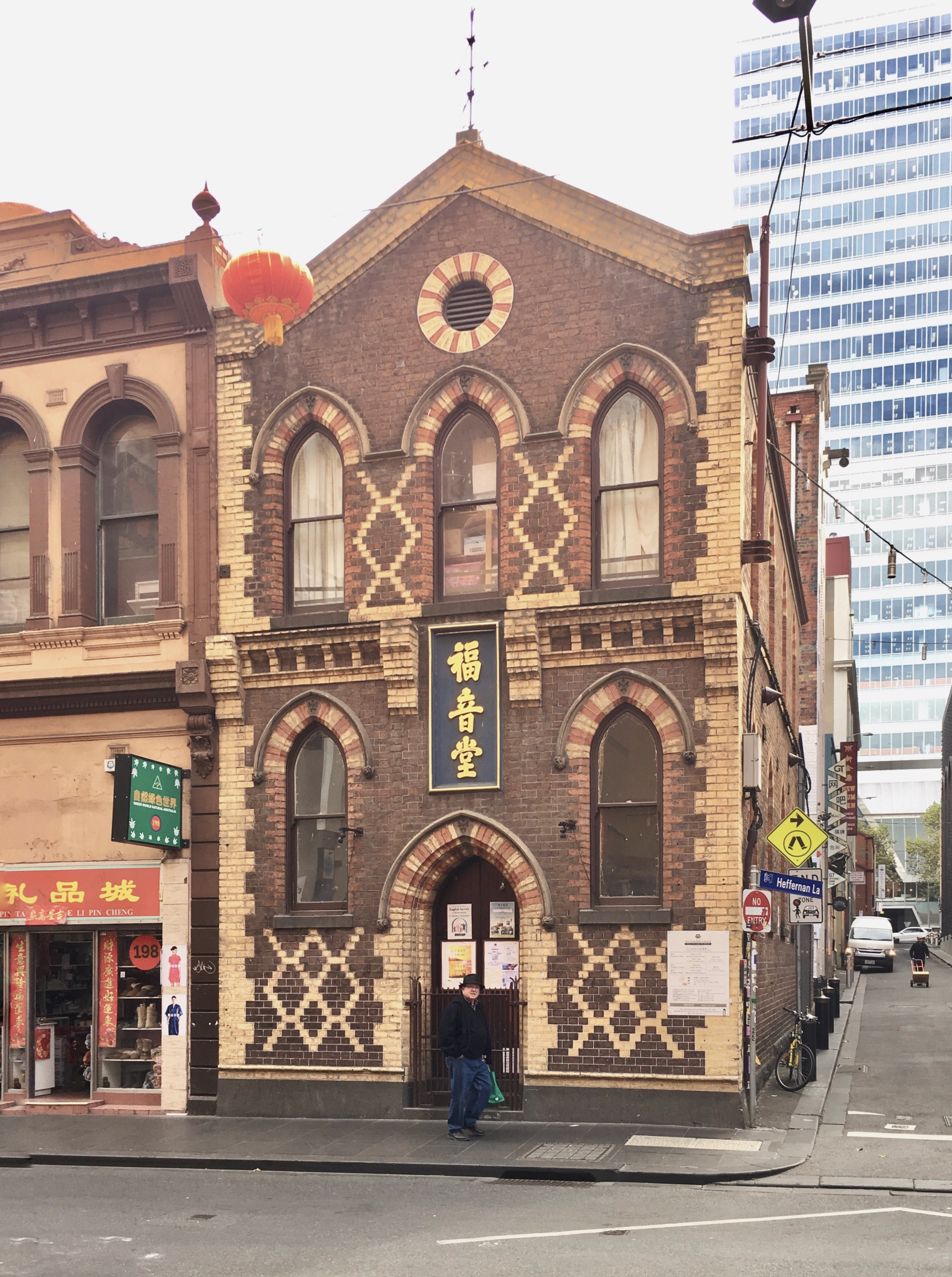
Chinese Mission Church

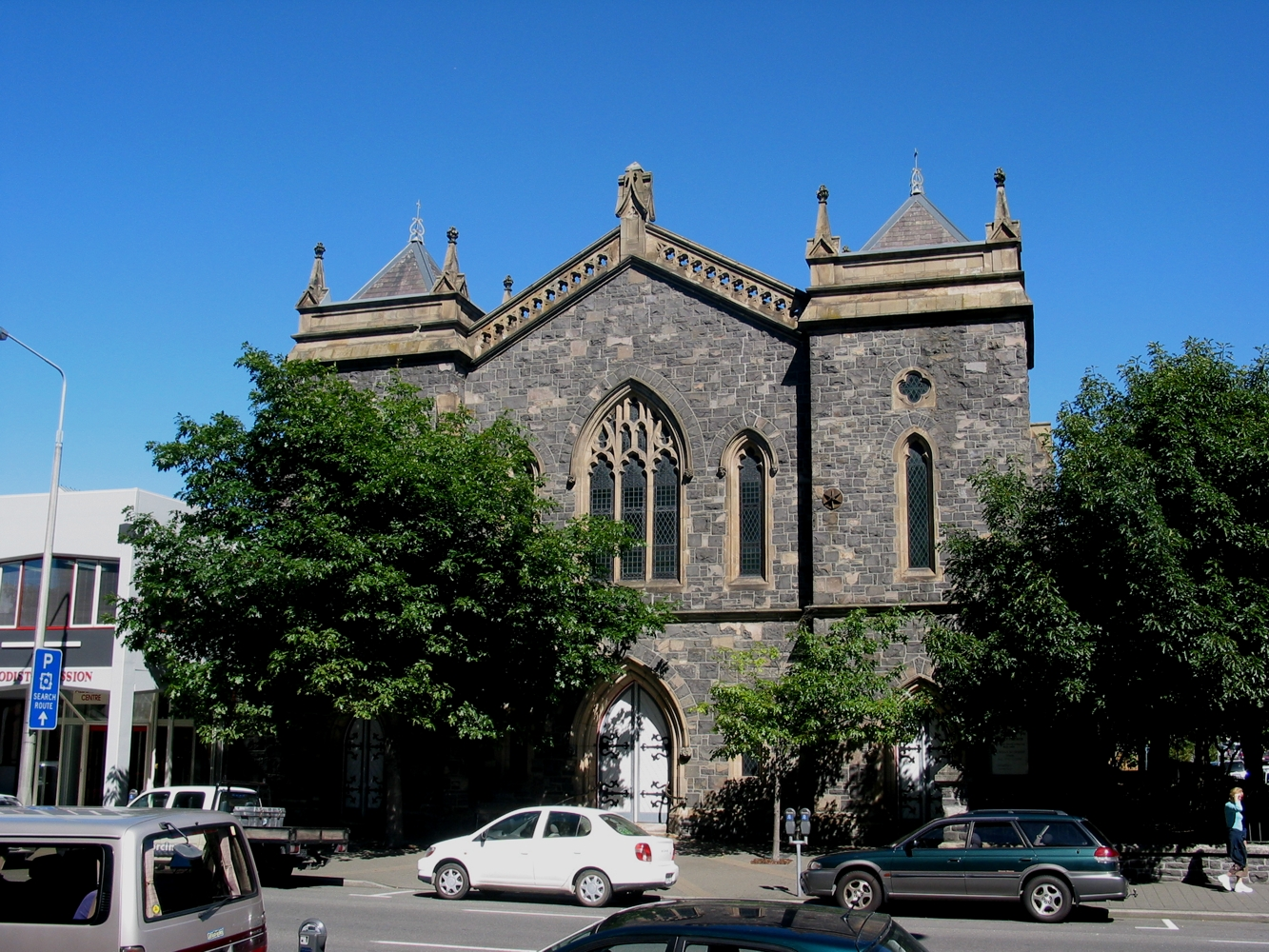
Durham Street Methodist Church

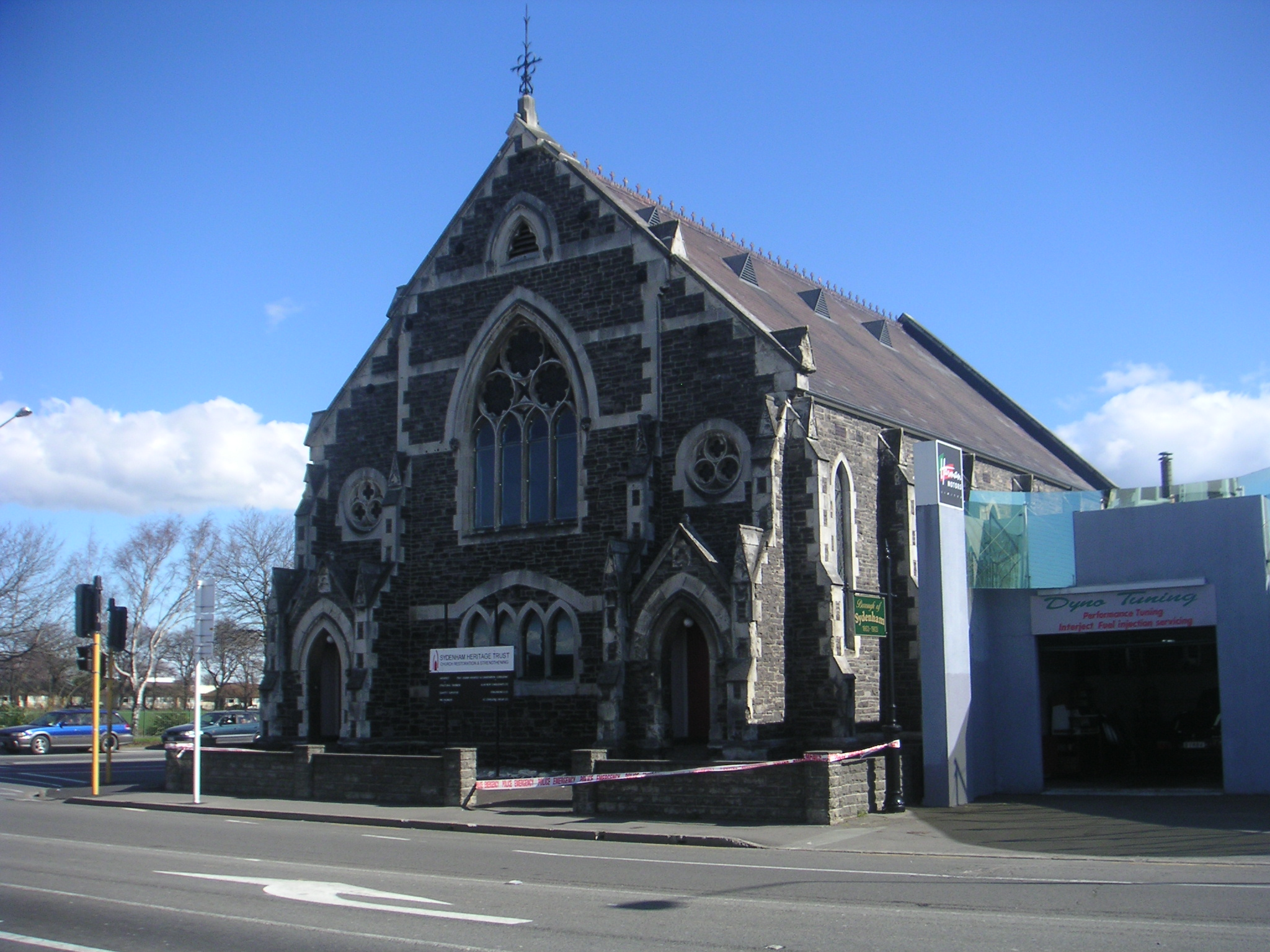
Colombo Street Methodist Church

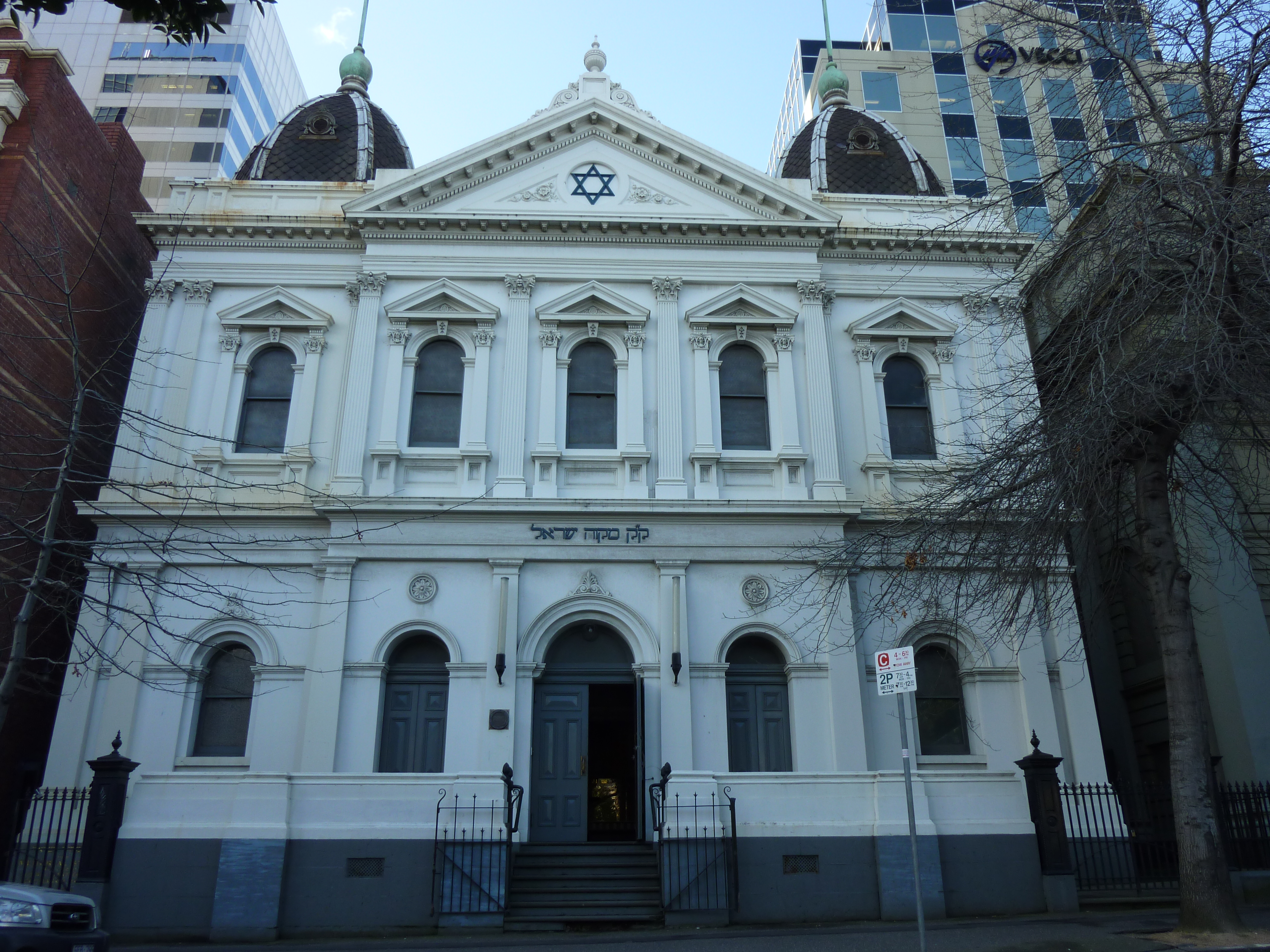
East Melbourne Synagogue

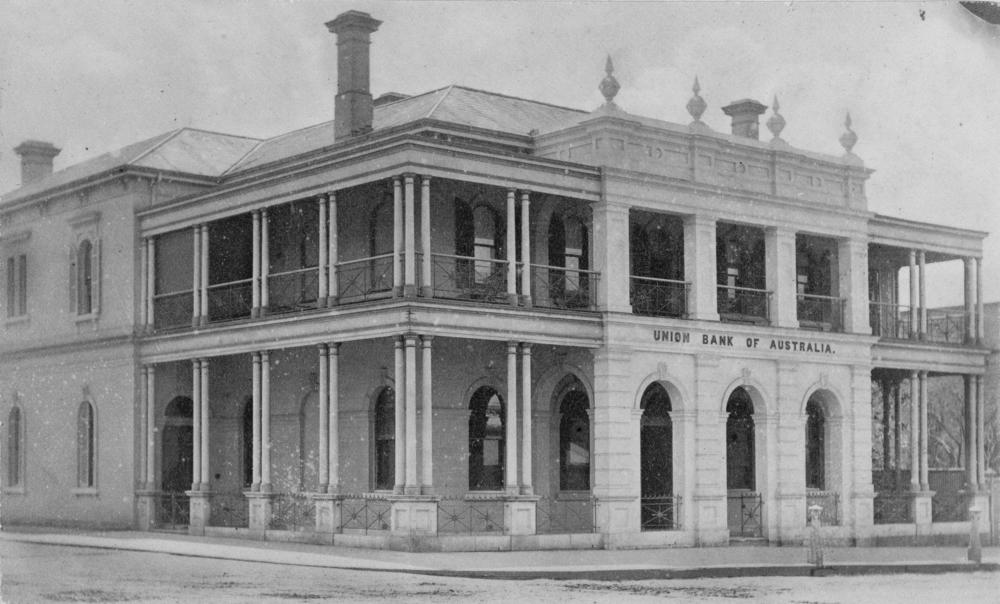
Union Bank, Brisbane
