= Sydenham, New Zealand =

Suburb of Christchurch, New Zealand

Sydenham
- Suburb
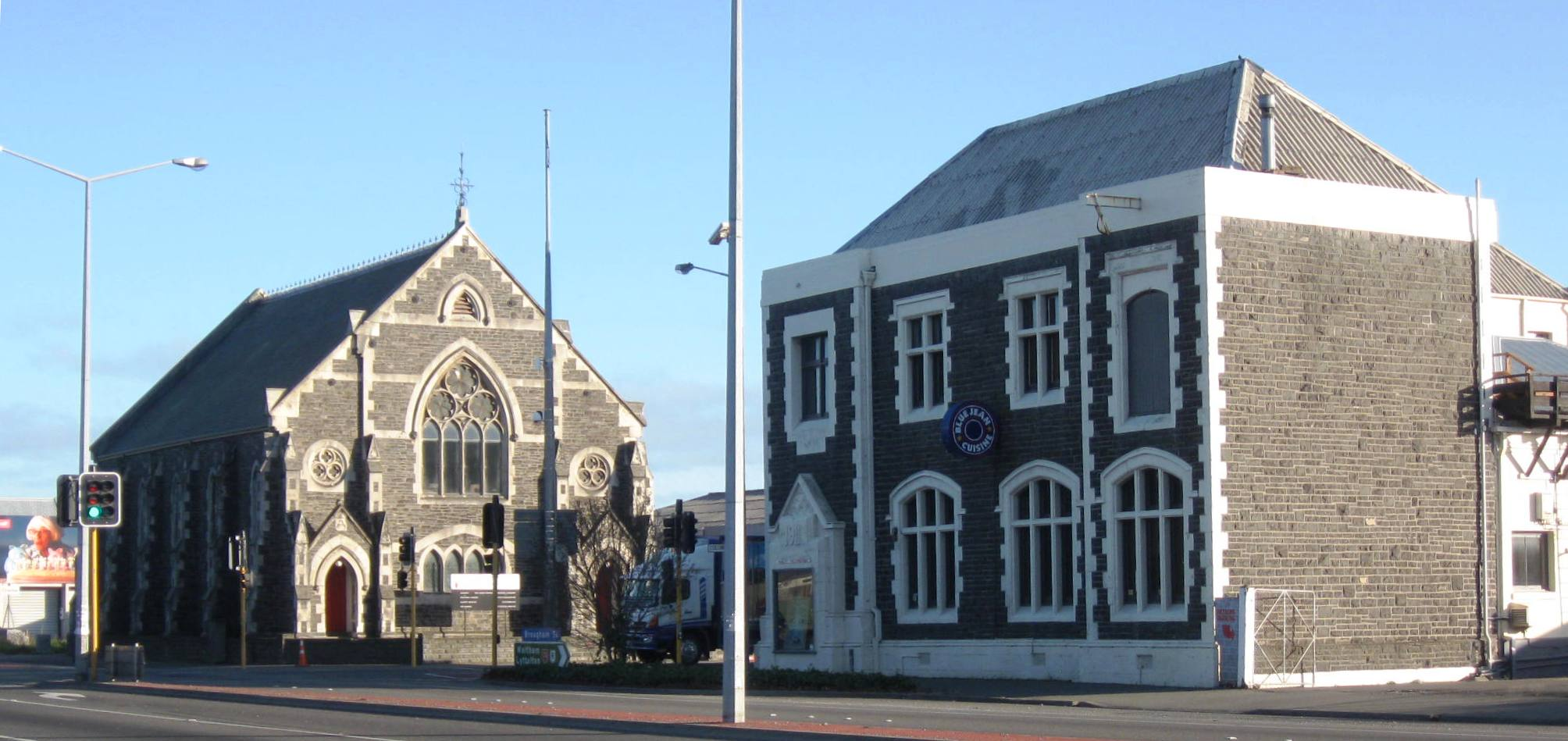
- The historic Sydenham Post Office and the Sydenham Heritage Church prior to the 2011 Christchurch earthquake
- Interactive map of Sydenham
- Coordinates: 43°33′S 172°38′E
- Country: New Zealand
- City: Christchurch
- Local authority: Christchurch City Council
- Electoral ward: Heathcote; Cashmere
- Community board: Waihoro Spreydon-Cashmere-Heathcote

Area
  - Land: 274 ha (680 acres)

Population (June 2025)
  - Total: 6,970
  - Density: 2,540/km^{2} (6,590/sq mi)

	Christchurch Central City
Addington	Sydenham	Waltham
Spreydon	Beckenham	St Martins

Sydenham (/ˈsɪdənəm/) is an inner suburb of Christchurch, New Zealand, 2 kilometres (1.2 miles) south of the city centre, on and around the city's main street, Colombo Street. It is a residential, retail and light industrial suburb.

== History ==
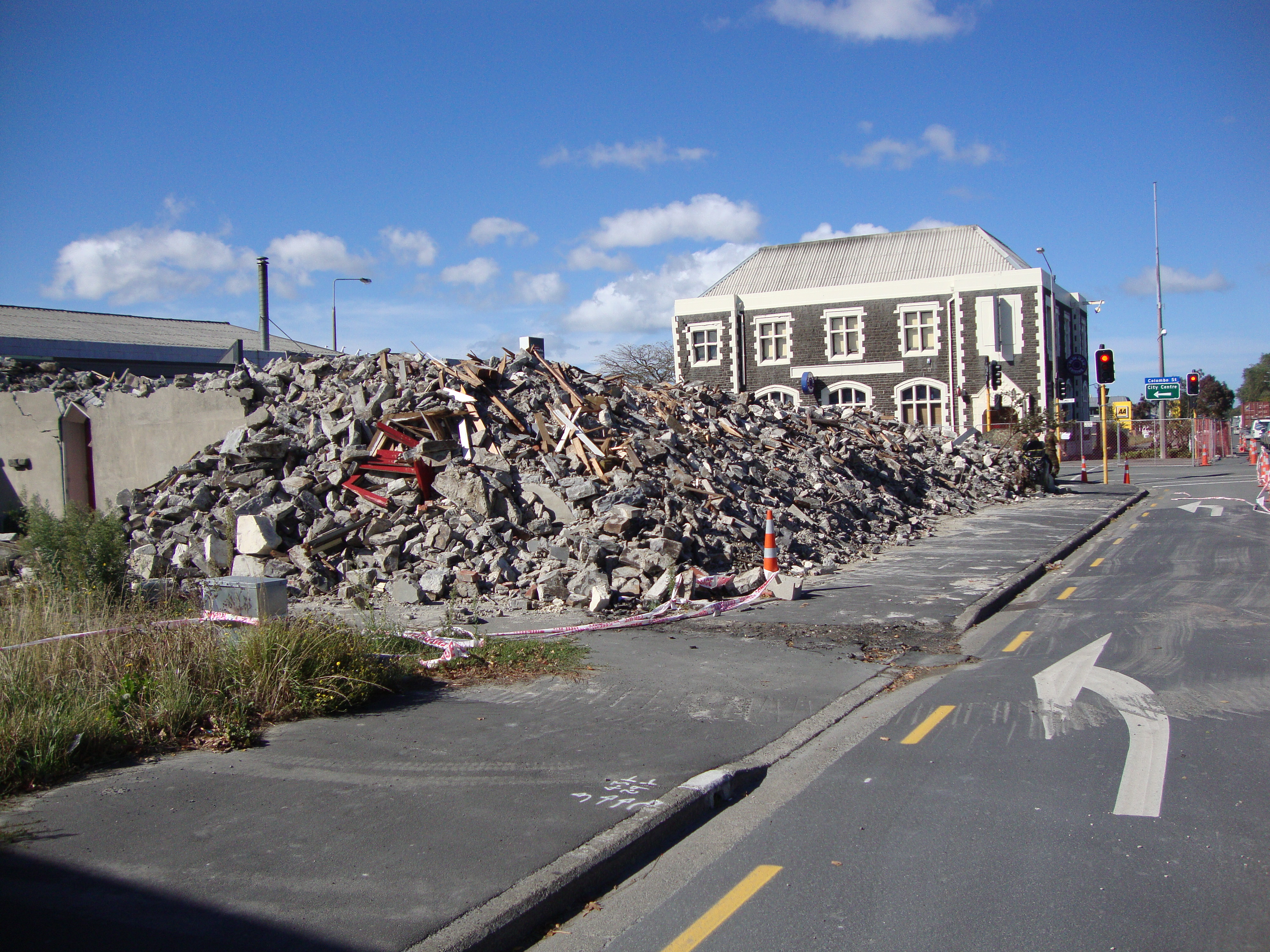
Sydenham Heritage Church after demolition, with the Post Office in the background

While the Sydenham area had seen development from the earliest days of European settlement in Christchurch, it was originally split between the Heathcote and Spreydon road districts instead of being a locality of its own right. The name Sydenham originally referred only to "Sydenham House", a crockery and china shop in the area so named by its owner, Charles Prince, after the north-west Kent town of Sydenham, which is now a London suburb within the London Borough of Lewisham. At a meeting regarding the formation of a borough council for the area, brought on by growth in the area, surveyor and future mayor Charles Allison advocated for the area to be named Sydenham, after the shop. The name was agreed upon, and Sydenham Borough Council came into existence in 1876. The first council and its mayor, George Booth, were elected in 1877. The population of the borough around this time was between five and six thousand, a number which doubled by the end of the 19th century, making it among the largest boroughs in New Zealand at the time.

Sydenham quickly flourished as a suburb. By 1902, the population of the suburb had more than doubled since its formation, making it the largest borough in New Zealand. It had roughly 2500 buildings with a combined value of roughly one million pounds, 26 miles (42 km) of roads, and 95 gas lamps for street lighting. On 31 March 1903, the borough amalgamated with the City of Christchurch and became a suburb. At that time Sydenham already had its own swimming-baths, fire-engine, cemetery and recreation grounds.

The shopping precinct located on Colombo Street was badly affected by the 2010 and 2011 Christchurch earthquakes with many commercial buildings demolished. Approximately 35 sites lost buildings.

The Christchurch City Council produced a master plan in 2012 for redeveloping Sydenham after the earthquakes.

The business district located south of Moorhouse Avenue was nicknamed "SoMo" by Lonely Planet in 2012.

There were around 800 businesses employing 5000 people in Sydenham in 2013. The business precinct had branded itself as "Sydenham Quarter". This marketing campaign was part of the Sydenham master plan.

The Sydenham school site surrounded by Colombo, Brougham, Buchan and Waverley streets was purchased by the New Zealand Government from the Christchurch City Council for $4.5 million dollars in 2015. This was then sold to Fletchers who built 76 terrace style houses on the site and named the development "350 Colombo".

== Geography ==
Sydenham is located near the centre of Christchurch, and is separated from the central city by the South Island Main Trunk Railway and Moorhouse Avenue. State Highway 76 runs through the middle of Sydenham before connecting to the Christchurch Southern Motorway in the neighbouring suburb of Spreydon to the west. A number of suburbs are located to the south of Sydenham at the base of the Port Hills, including Somerfield, Beckenham and Cashmere. To the east, Sydenham is separated from neighbouring St Martins by the Ōpāwaho / Heathcote River, and from Waltham by Waltham Road.

== Demographics ==
Sydenham comprises four statistical areas. Sydenham Central is almost entirely commercial and light industry. Sydenham West, North and South are primarily residential.

Individual statistical areas
Name	Area (km^{2})	Population	Density (per km^{2})	Dwellings	Median age	Median income
Sydenham Central	1.21	261	216	138	30.6 years	$55,000
Sydenham West	0.49	1,350	2,755	651	39.8 years	$35,600
Sydenham North	0.48	2,208	4,600	990	32.4 years	$41,300
Sydenham South	0.55	2,736	4,975	1,254	36.7 years	$38,500
New Zealand					38.1 years	$41,500

=== Sydenham Central ===
Sydenham Central covers 1.21 km^{2} (0.47 sq mi). It had an estimated population of 290 as of June 2025, with a population density of 240 people per km^{2}.

Historical population of Sydenham Central
Year	Pop.	±% p.a.
2006	126	—
2013	114	−1.42%
2018	138	+3.90%
2023	261	+13.59%

Sydenham Central had a population of 261 in the 2023 New Zealand census, an increase of 123 people (89.1%) since the 2018 census, and an increase of 147 people (128.9%) since the 2013 census. There were 138 males, 120 females, and 6 people of other genders in 138 dwellings. 10.3% of people identified as LGBTIQ+. The median age was 30.6 years (compared with 38.1 years nationally). There were 15 people (5.7%) aged under 15 years, 111 (42.5%) aged 15 to 29, 129 (49.4%) aged 30 to 64, and 9 (3.4%) aged 65 or older.

People could identify as more than one ethnicity. The results were 59.8% European (Pākehā); 10.3% Māori; 5.7% Pasifika; 33.3% Asian; 3.4% Middle Eastern, Latin American and African New Zealanders (MELAA); and 5.7% other, which includes people giving their ethnicity as "New Zealander". English was spoken by 90.8%, Māori by 2.3%, Samoan by 2.3%, and other languages by 34.5%. No language could be spoken by 2.3% (e.g. too young to talk). New Zealand Sign Language was known by 1.1%. The percentage of people born overseas was 46.0, compared with 28.8% nationally.

Religious affiliations were 17.2% Christian, 3.4% Hindu, 2.3% Islam, 1.1% Māori religious beliefs, 4.6% Buddhist, and 2.3% other religions. People who answered that they had no religion were 65.5%, and 3.4% of people did not answer the census question.

Of those at least 15 years old, 114 (46.3%) people had a bachelor's or higher degree, 102 (41.5%) had a post-high school certificate or diploma, and 30 (12.2%) people exclusively held high school qualifications. The median income was $55,000, compared with $41,500 nationally. 24 people (9.8%) earned over $100,000 compared to 12.1% nationally. The employment status of those at least 15 was 192 (78.0%) full-time, 24 (9.8%) part-time, and 6 (2.4%) unemployed.

=== Residential areas ===
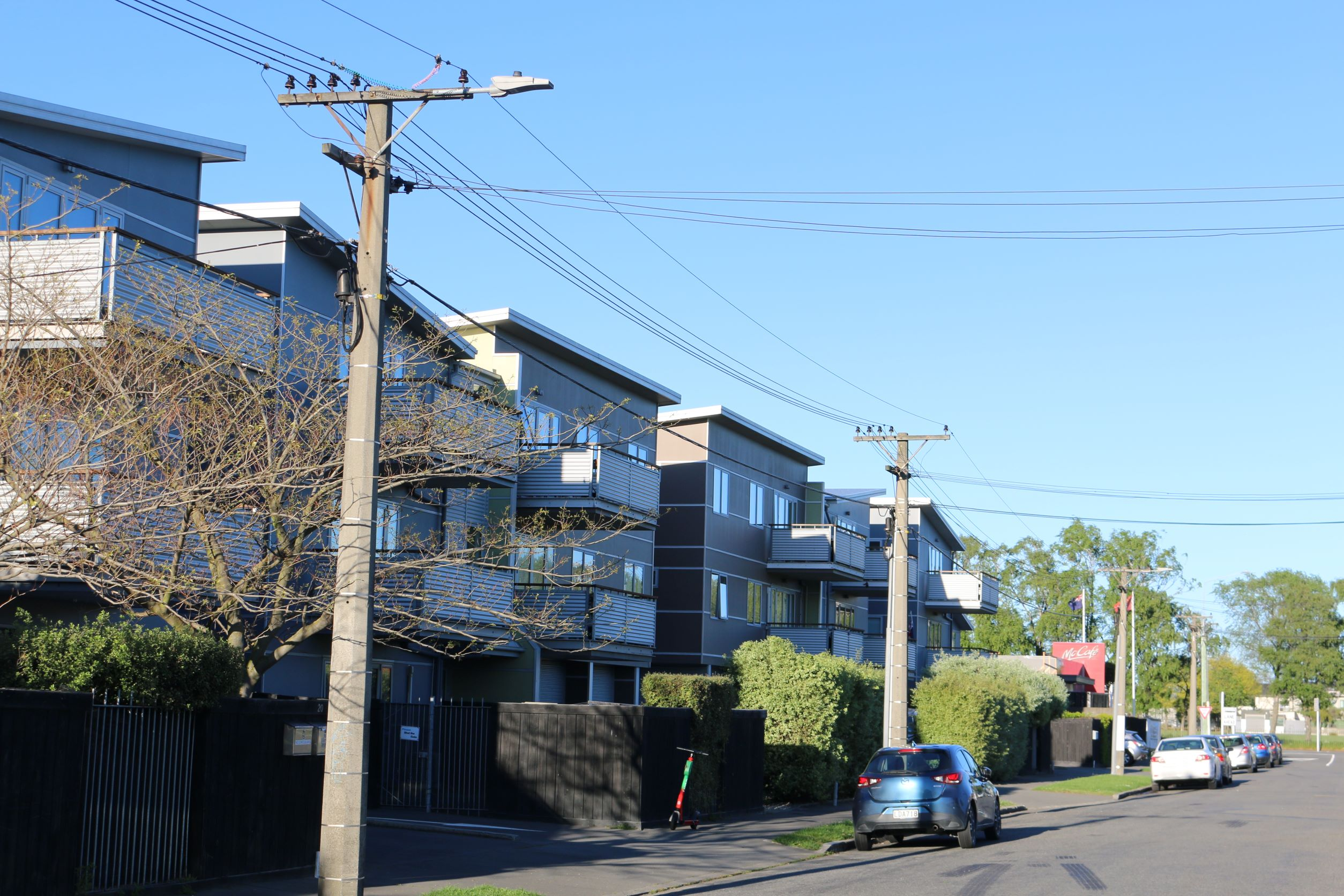
Hutcheson Street, a residential area of Sydenham, Christchurch (October 2021)

The residential areas of Sydenham cover 1.52 km^{2} (0.59 sq mi). They have an estimated population of 6,680 as of June 2025, with a population density of 4,395 people per km^{2}.

Historical population of the residential areas
Year	Pop.	±% p.a.
2006	5,157	—
2013	5,556	+1.07%
2018	6,105	+1.90%
2023	6,294	+0.61%

The residential areas had a population of 6,294 in the 2023 New Zealand census, an increase of 189 people (3.1%) since the 2018 census, and an increase of 738 people (13.3%) since the 2013 census. There were 3,015 males, 3,204 females, and 72 people of other genders in 2,895 dwellings. 6.7% of people identified as LGBTIQ+. There were 873 people (13.9%) aged under 15 years, 1,437 (22.8%) aged 15 to 29, 2,988 (47.5%) aged 30 to 64, and 993 (15.8%) aged 65 or older.

People could identify as more than one ethnicity. The results were 72.7% European (Pākehā); 11.3% Māori; 4.2% Pasifika; 19.0% Asian; 3.0% Middle Eastern, Latin American and African New Zealanders (MELAA); and 2.2% other, which includes people giving their ethnicity as "New Zealander". English was spoken by 95.6%, Māori by 2.7%, Samoan by 1.3%, and other languages by 18.8%. No language could be spoken by 2.4% (e.g. too young to talk). New Zealand Sign Language was known by 0.9%. The percentage of people born overseas was 31.1, compared with 28.8% nationally.

Religious affiliations were 29.4% Christian, 3.9% Hindu, 2.2% Islam, 0.4% Māori religious beliefs, 1.1% Buddhist, 1.0% New Age, and 3.1% other religions. People who answered that they had no religion were 52.9%, and 6.1% of people did not answer the census question.

Of those at least 15 years old, 1,638 (30.2%) people had a bachelor's or higher degree, 2,532 (46.7%) had a post-high school certificate or diploma, and 1,251 (23.1%) people exclusively held high school qualifications. 366 people (6.8%) earned over $100,000 compared to 12.1% nationally. The employment status of those at least 15 was 2,823 (52.1%) full-time, 663 (12.2%) part-time, and 168 (3.1%) unemployed.

== Heritage buildings ==
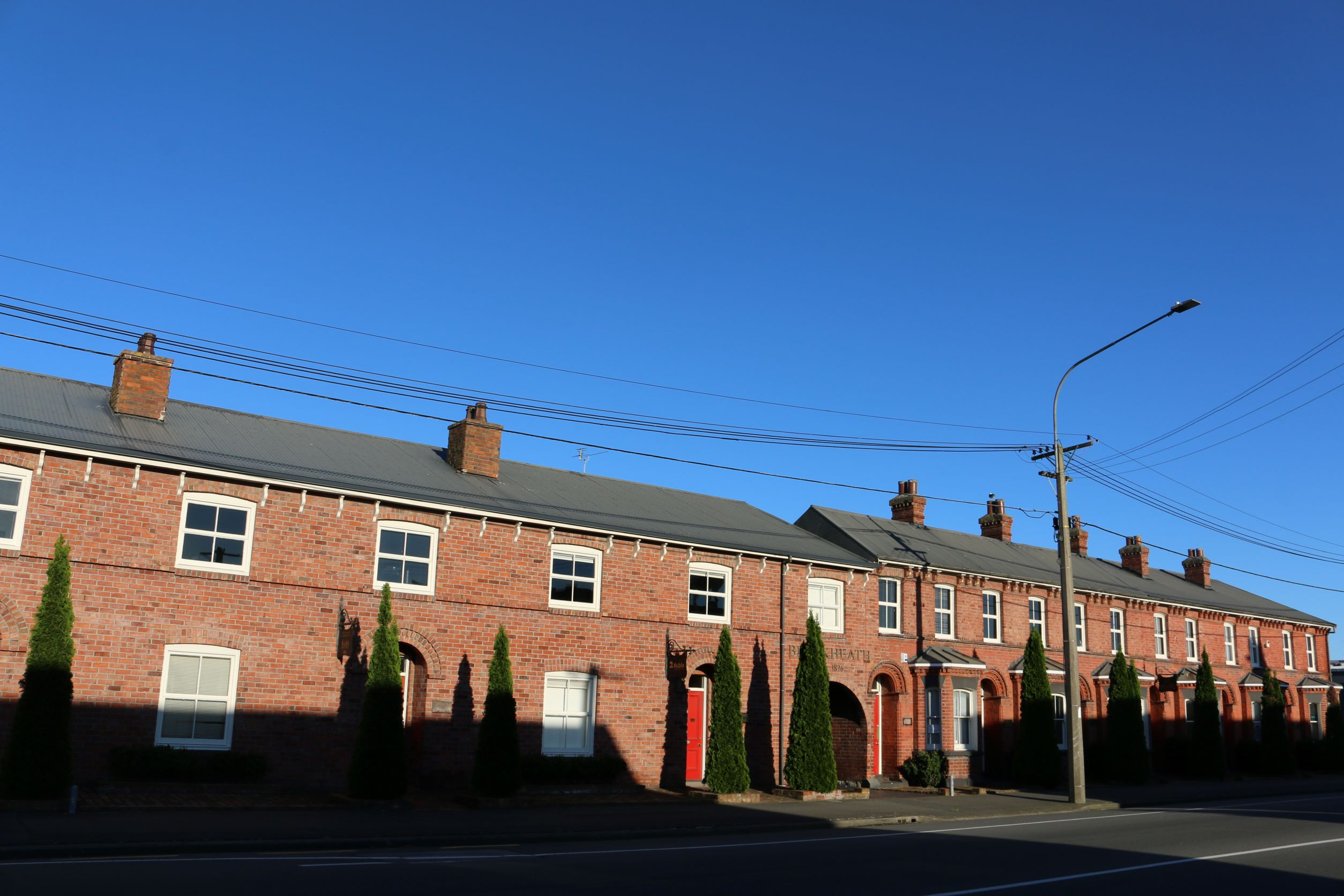
Blackheath terrace houses (built in 1876)

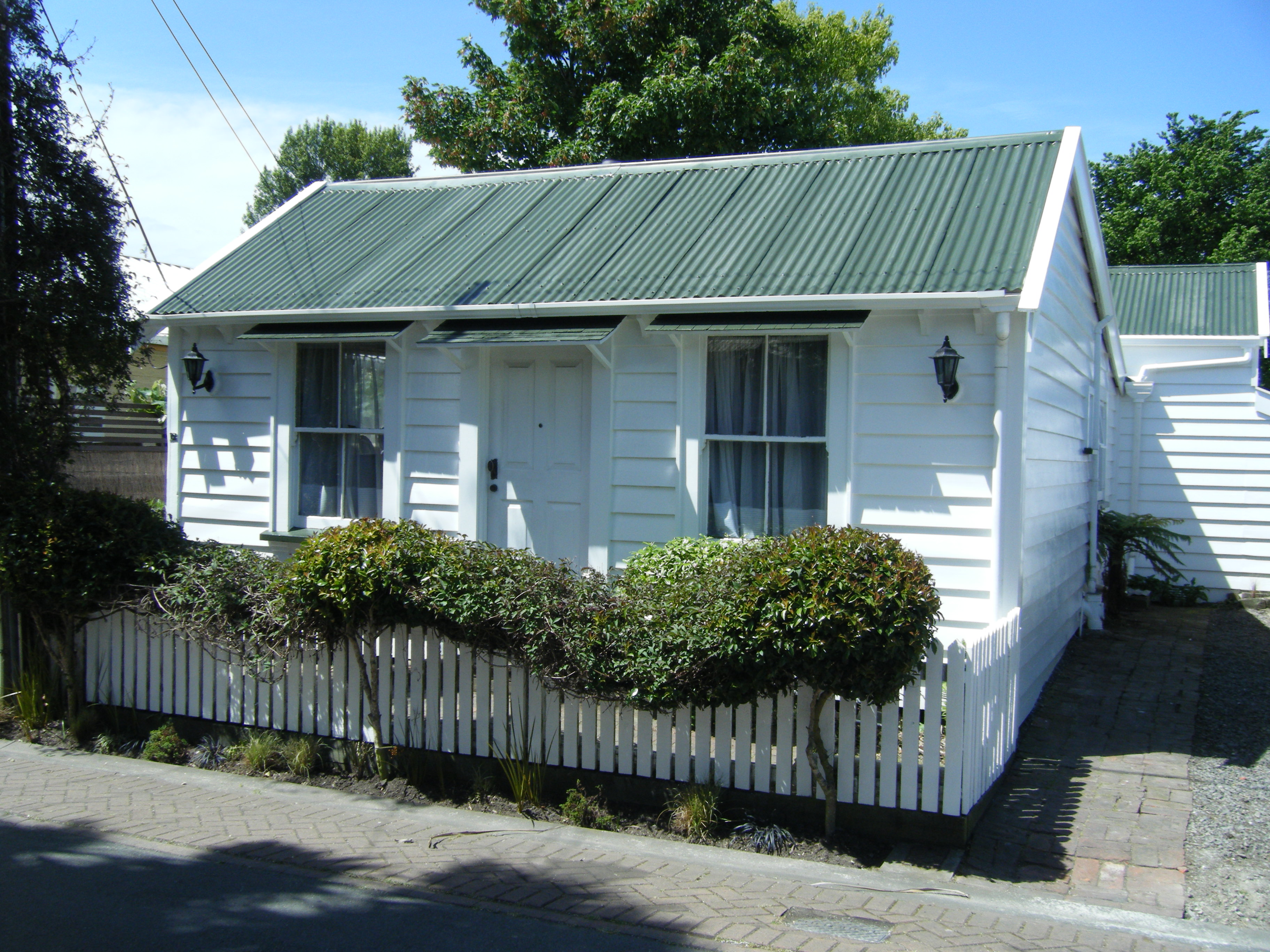
This historic cottage is typical of settler housing in Sydenham Christchurch. It was built in 1876 from tōtara.

Sydenham has a number of heritage buildings registered by Heritage New Zealand, with some already lost or to be lost due to the February 2011 Christchurch earthquake. The New Zealand Loan and Mercantile Woolstore in Durham Street is the only Category I heritage building. Coming from the south, the Sydenham Post Office and the Sydenham Heritage Church formed an entry into the strip shopping area along Colombo Street, but the church was controversially demolished shortly after the February earthquake.

Nazareth House Chapel is located west of Sydenham Park and belongs to a retirement village. Blackheath Place are residential brick terrace houses that are rather uncommon in New Zealand. Three registered cottages are located in Shelley and Tennyson Streets.

== Economy ==
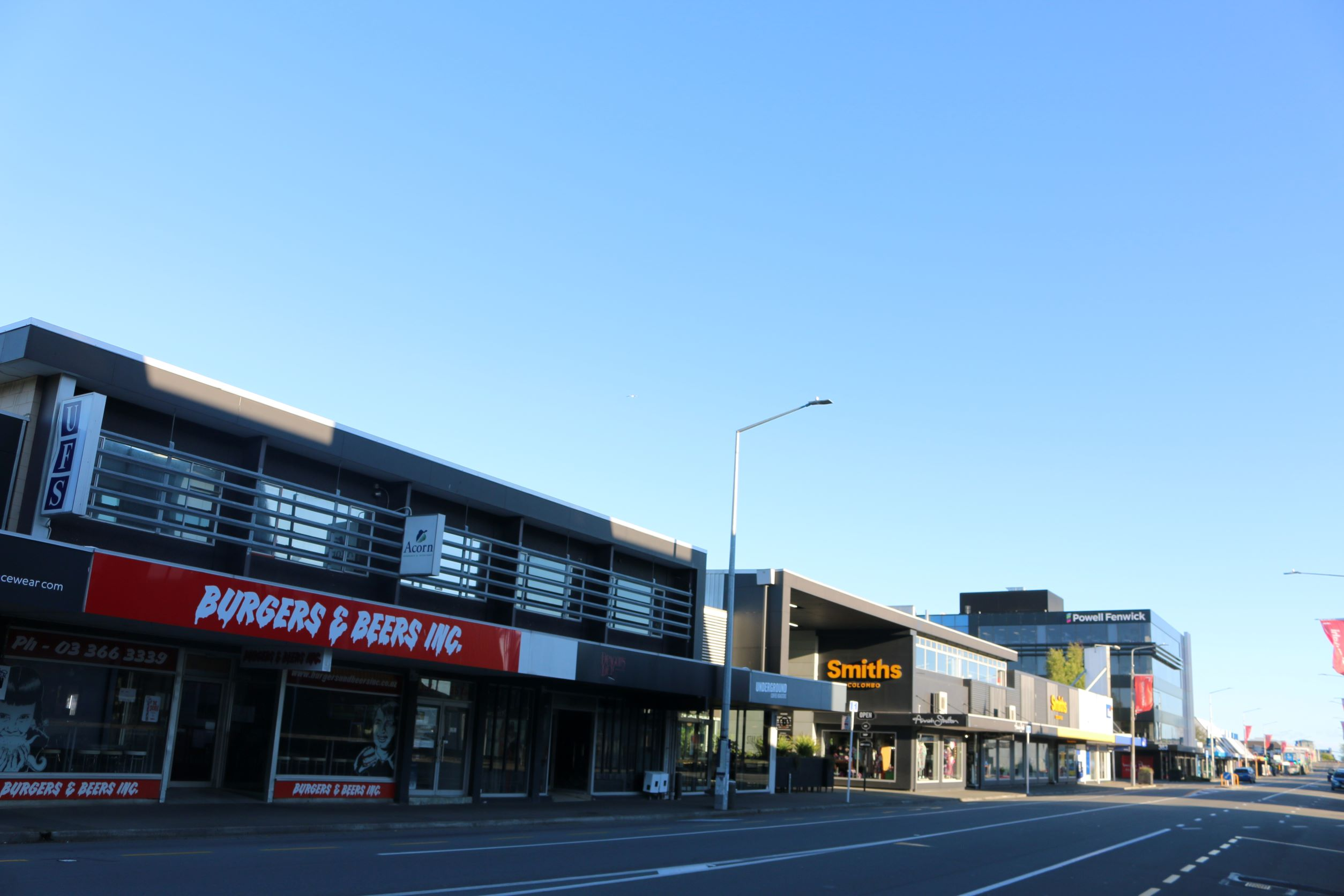
The Colombo shopping mall with the Powell Fenwick building in the background, Colombo Street, Sydenham, Christchurch (October 2021)

The Colombo is a shopping centre in Sydenham. It has 44 tenants, and includes the Academy Gold Cinema. In July 2020, Christchurch-based retail chain Smiths City moved its main store to The Colombo.

Land between Brougham Street and Moorhouse Avenue either side of Colombo Street that was originally residential is now light industrial.

There are some an art galleries and shops in Sydenham, mainly in the industrial areas. These include Jonathan Smart Gallery and NZ Art Broker. Some art events have been held in Sydenham.

== Sporting teams ==
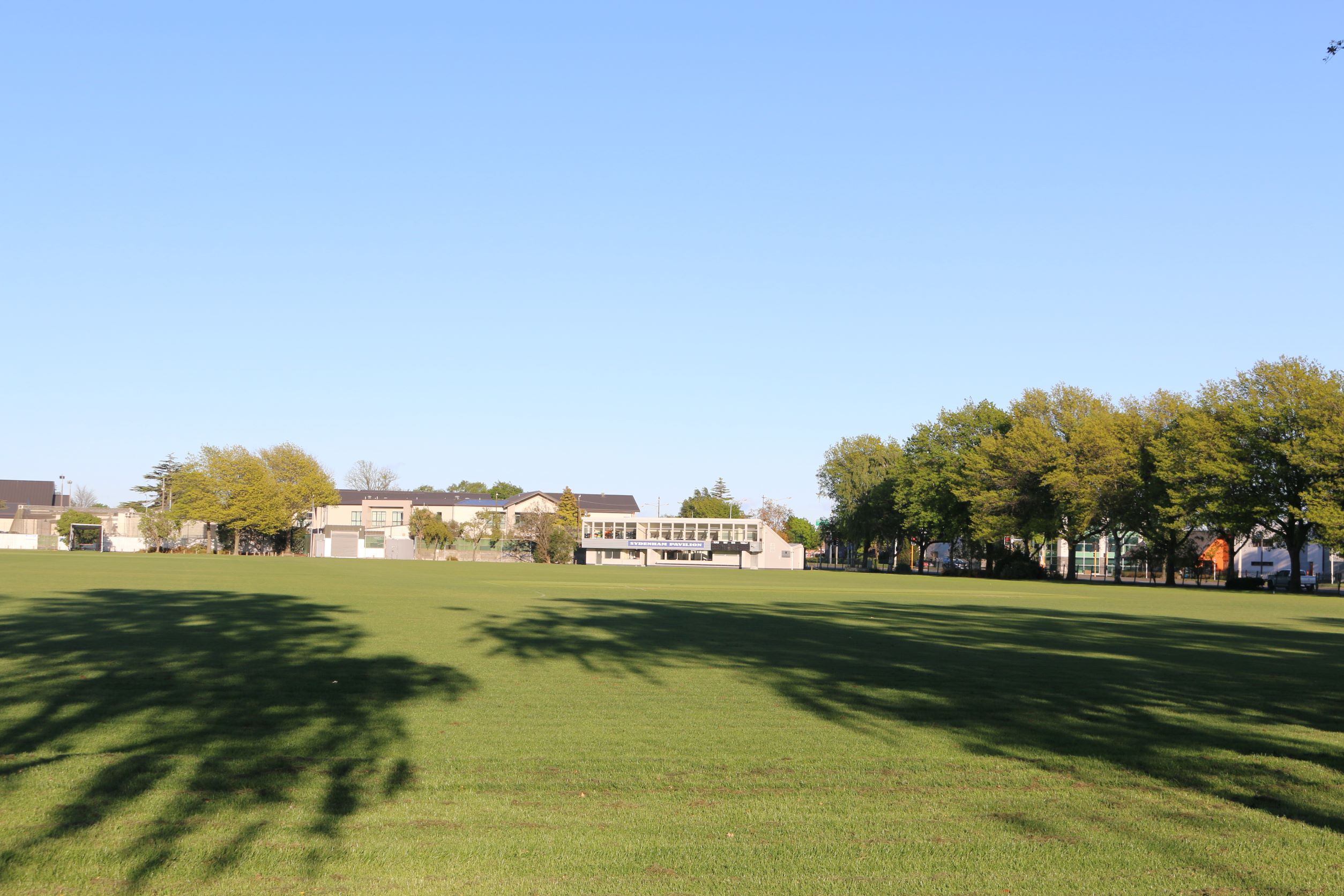
Sydenham Park (October 2021)

Sydenham Park, at the intersection of Brougham and Colombo Streets, is public open space that also acts as the home ground for Sydenham Cricket Club, Sydenham Lawn Bowls Club, Sydenham Hockey Club and Sydenham Rugby Club. All four clubs have provided players for their respective New Zealand teams. These including Blair Hartland, Lee Germon, Rob Nicol, Chad Bowes and Stephen Fleming for cricket, Gary Lawson for Bowls, John Radovonich for hockey and Charlie Oliver for rugby union. Ben Stokes, the English cricketer spent time in 2020 working with the Sydenham Cricket Club.

== Christchurch South Police station ==
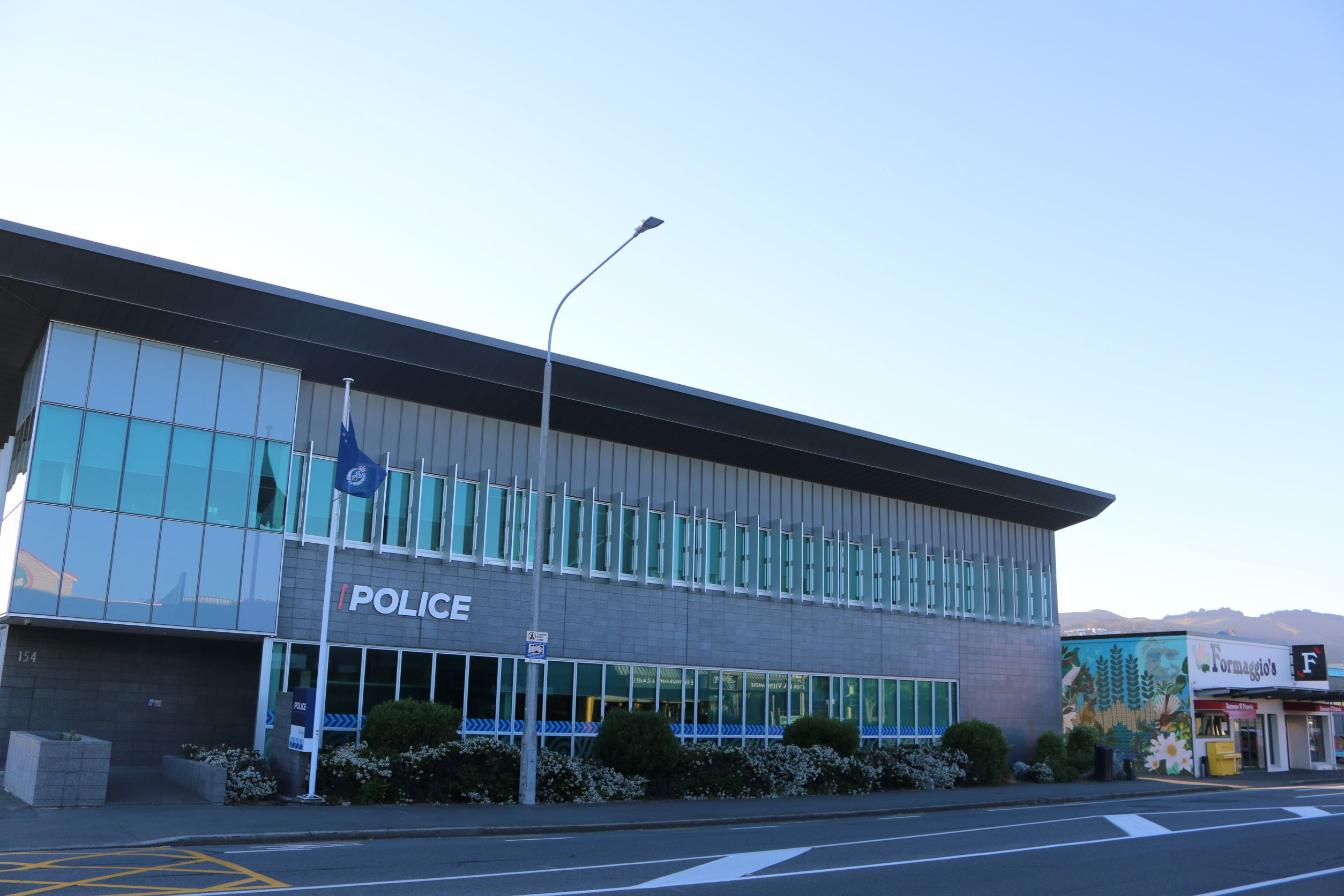
Christchurch south police station, Sydenham, Christchurch (October 2021)

The Christchurch South Police Station is located on Colombo Street in Beckenham. The previous police station for Sydenham was in Stanley Street, and was replaced by the Christchurch South station. It was opened in 2009 by the minister of police Judith Collins. The building cost $7.5 million to build.

== Education ==
Sydenham School, on the corner of Brougham and Colombo Streets, was first opened in 1872 and known as Colombo Road School. The land cost one hundred pounds to purchase and a further 862 pounds to build the school. By March 1873, there were almost 400 children enrolled. The school was renamed Sydenham school in 1880. At one stage it was the largest school in New Zealand. The school was closed in December 2000.

In 2021, there were no primary or secondary schools within the suburb of Sydenham. Somerfield School takes students to the west of Colombo Street and south of Brougham Street. Waltham School takes students to the east of Colombo Street and south of Moorhouse Avenue. Addington School takes students to the west of Colombo Street and to the north of Somerfield school's zone. Beckenham School takes students to the east of Colombo Street and south of King and Huxley Streets.
