= South Island Organ Company =

New Zealand pipe organ builders

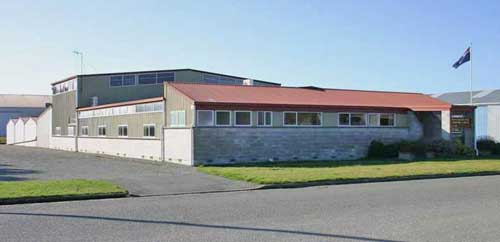
South Island Organ Company Factory

The South Island Organ Company is a manufacturer of pipe organs in Timaru, New Zealand. The company, in business since 1968, has manufactured and restored over 300 pipe organs throughout New Zealand, Australia and Oceania.

== Founders ==
South Island Organ Company was established by Garth Cattle (from Osmond of Taunton) and Vic Hackworthy (from Hill Norman & Beard of London).

== History ==
During the 1970s employed John Gray, of Hill Norman & Beard, London as voicer, John Hargraves, of John Lee, Feilding as an organ builder and Neil Stocker as an apprentice.

The new Company made an immediate impact with the rebuilding of St Johns, Invercargill (1931 3/37 HN&B/Lewis), the restoration of All Saints (1877 2/18 Bevington) and the rebuilding of St Matthew's (1879 3/26 Bevington) Dunedin and Christchurch Cathedral Nelson organs in the first two years. These soon led to our first new organ at Craighead School (2/15), Timaru in 1970 and in 1973 the first 4 manual organ built in New Zealand for many years at St Paul's Cathedral, Dunedin (4/61 Willis). In the same year organbuilder Gerald Green (of Hill Norman & Beard, Lewes) joined the company.

By 1973 South Island Organ Company purchased both existing South Island sole-trader organ builders and built a new factory at Washdyke. In 1974, South Island Organ Company extended to the North Island of New Zealand. The first North Island installation being a new organ for Our Lady of Lourdes in Palmerston North (2/3 rank extension).

In the mid 1970s, in addition to building new pipe organs and rebuilding old instruments, South Island Organ Company began promoting conservation and preservation of New Zealand historic organs. This developed from a growing realization of the fragility of the resource in a largely unregulated market, and a conviction that the future of the organ was as a work of original artistry and craftsmanship.

By 1980 South Island Organ Company had built, rebuilt, and restored seven Cathedral organs in New Zealand, including a second new tracker organ at Old St Paul's Cathedral (2/20) Wellington in 1977 and the first notable historic restoration, the 3 manual 1878 Halmshaw & Sons organ at Cathedral of the Blessed Sacrament Christchurch (3/27) in 1978.

Historic restoration brought with it a new appreciation of tubular pneumatic action organs culminating in the restoration in 1985 of the 1906 Norman & Beard 4 manual concert organ in Wellington Town Hall . The success of this project led to further pneumatic action restorations and overseas interest and in 1990 the company's first project in Australia, transplanting and rebuilding the 1868/1891/1953 (3/32) George Fincham organ from St Kilda Blind Institute for Paton Memorial Uniting at Deepdene. This was soon followed by the restoration of the George Fincham organs at Church of All Nations (1876, 2/13), Carlton and Trinity Uniting (1884, 2/14), Brighton in 1992, and in 1993 Victoria's prime historic organ at St Mary Star of the Sea (1899, 3/38) West Melbourne.

South Island Organ Company operates out of its third factory built in 1985 at Washdyke Industrial Park. The Company regularly tunes and maintains over 300 pipe organs over Australasia.

== Earthquake disaster ==
On 22 February 2011, an earthquake struck Christchurch, New Zealand taking the lives of South Island Organ Company's foreman Neil Stocker and factory hand Scott Lucy. Paul Dunlop, a helper from Christchurch was also killed. The deceased were a part of a team of eight which was removing the organ of Christchurch's Durham Street Methodist Church which had been badly damaged by an earthquake the previous September, and was reduced to rubble by the February earthquake.

== Restorations ==
- The Maxwell Fernie Organ
- St Paul's Cathedral, Dunedin, New Zealand
- St Patrick's Basilica, Fremantle, Australia
- St Paul's Trinity Pacific Church
- St Peter's Anglican Church, Willis St, Wellington
- St Mary's Cathedral, Perth
