= Durham Street Methodist Church =

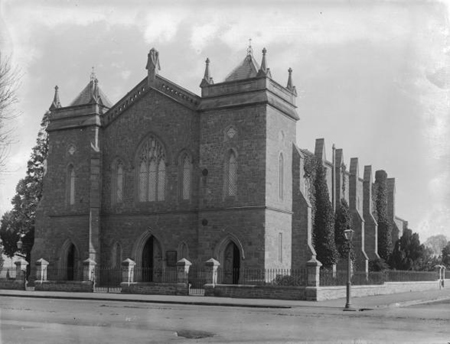
- Durham Street Methodist Church c. 1890–1915
- Durham Street Methodist Church
- 43°31′40″S 172°38′00″E
- Location: Christchurch Central City
- Country: New Zealand
- Previous denomination: Methodist
- Website: aldersgate.org.nz/durham-street-methodist-church

History
- Status: Church (1864 – 2010)
- Founded: 1864
- Founder: Samuel Bealey
- Dedicated: 25 December 1864
- Events: 2010 Canterbury earthquake; 2011 Christchurch earthquake

Architecture
- Functional status: Destroyed by earthquakes
- Architects: Crouch and Wilson; Samuel Farr (supervising)
- Architectural type: Church
- Style: Gothic Revival
- Closed: 2010
- Demolished: 22 February 2011

Specifications
- Materials: Halswell and Port Hills basalt; Charteris Bay sandstone

Heritage New Zealand – Category 1
- Official name: Durham Street Methodist Church
- Designated: 2 April 1985
- Delisted: 2011
- Reference no.: 3099

The Durham Street Methodist Church was a former heritage-listed Methodist church located in Christchurch, New Zealand. Built in 1864 in the Gothic Revival style, it was, prior to its destruction, the earliest stone church constructed in the Canterbury region.

The church was severely damaged by an earthquake on 4 September 2010, but collapsed during a following earthquake on 22 February 2011, killing three workers who were removing the organ.

Prior to its demolition, the church was, in 1985, registered as a "Historic Place – Category I" by Heritage New Zealand. The heritage registration was lifted in 2011 and the ruins of the church were destroyed.

== History ==
Christchurch was mainly an Anglican settlement. The congregation of Methodists was small, but active. The first Methodist Chapel, which was located in High Street, was sold in 1864.

An architectural competition was held for a new church in Durham Street. The winning architectural firm, Crouch and Wilson from Melbourne, had entered a design in the Gothic Revival style in the 1863 competition. Local architect Samuel Farr, who had come to Akaroa in early 1850, came second in the competition and was engaged for the construction supervision. In early 1864, the foundation stone was laid by Samuel Bealey who at the time was Superintendent of Canterbury Province. The building was officially opened on Christmas Day 1864 and Canterbury thus had its first church built of permanent materials. The stone used includes Halswell and Port Hills basalt and Charteris Bay sandstone. A gallery was added to the building in 1869 and a schoolroom was built next to it in 1875. A parsonage was subsequently erected facing Chester Street. In 1951 a Memorial Chapel was added, dedicated to those killed in both World Wars.

=== Heritage listing ===
On 2 April 1985, the church building was registered with the registration number 3099 by the Historic Places Trust as a Category I heritage building. An atrium was built in 1987 to connect the church to the Aldersgate building next door which houses offices for both the church and the Christian Methodist Mission.

In 2011, the heritage order was lifted.

=== Earthquakes ===
The 1888 North Canterbury earthquake caused a spire in the south-eastern corner to tilt, leading to its subsequent removal. The church and hall were severely damaged in the September 2010 earthquake and the aftershock the following Boxing Day. The building collapsed the following February in the 2011 Christchurch earthquake while a team of eight workers from the South Island Organ Company were dismantling the organ, killing three of them.

=== Replacement building ===
A replacement building opened on 29 March 2020. The courtyard contains a plaque commemorating the three people killed in the 2011 earthquake.

== Interior ==
The interior plan reflected the standard Victorian era Methodist layout of a meeting hall surrounded by galleries and was designed to accommodate 1200 people. The cedar pulpit, centred on the back wall, was accessed by a double staircase. The organ, installed in 1902, replaced an earlier hand pumped organ which had been installed in 1874. The replacement organ was built by Ingram & Co. in Hereford, United Kingdom and was valued at $1 million prior to the church's destruction. Four sets of memorial stained glass windows were installed at different times.

== Gallery ==
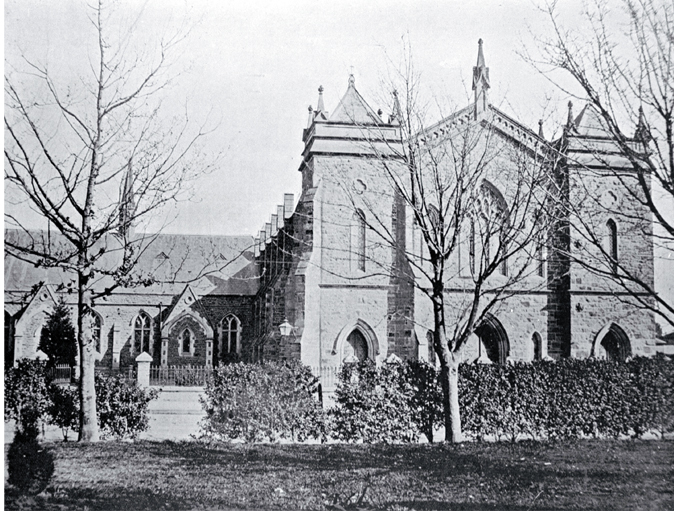
Photo from 1921. The building at right angles is the school that was added in 1873, which can't be seen from Durham Street these days, as the view is blocked by the Methodist Mission

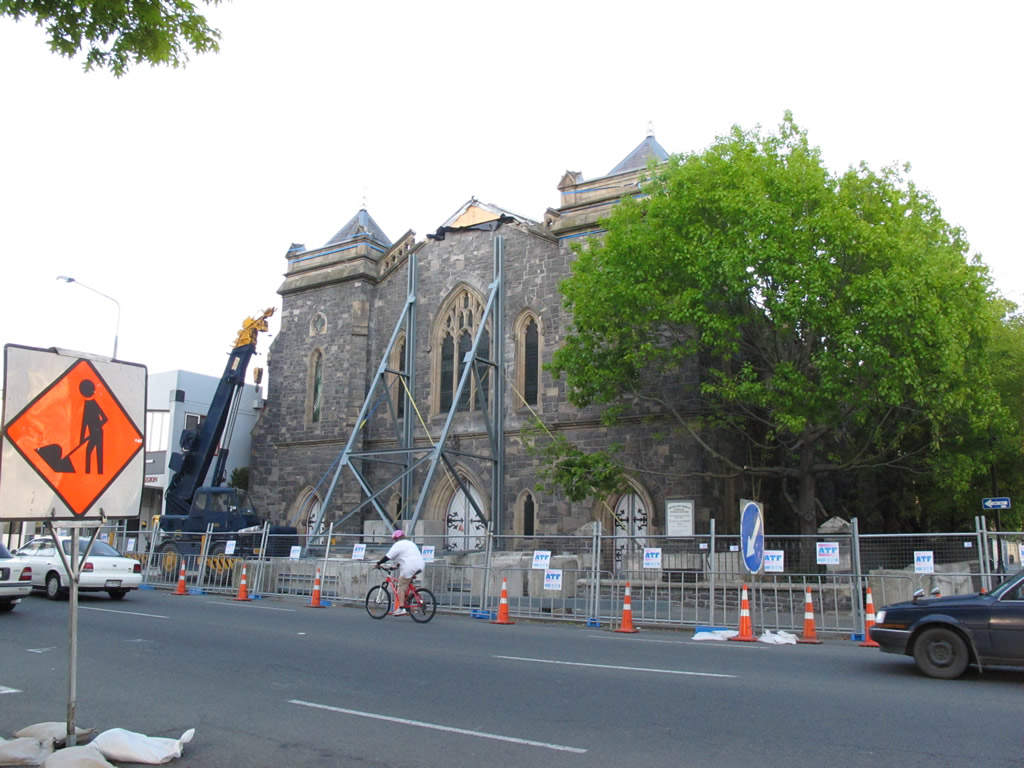
The church in November 2010 with steel bracing after the 2010 Canterbury earthquake

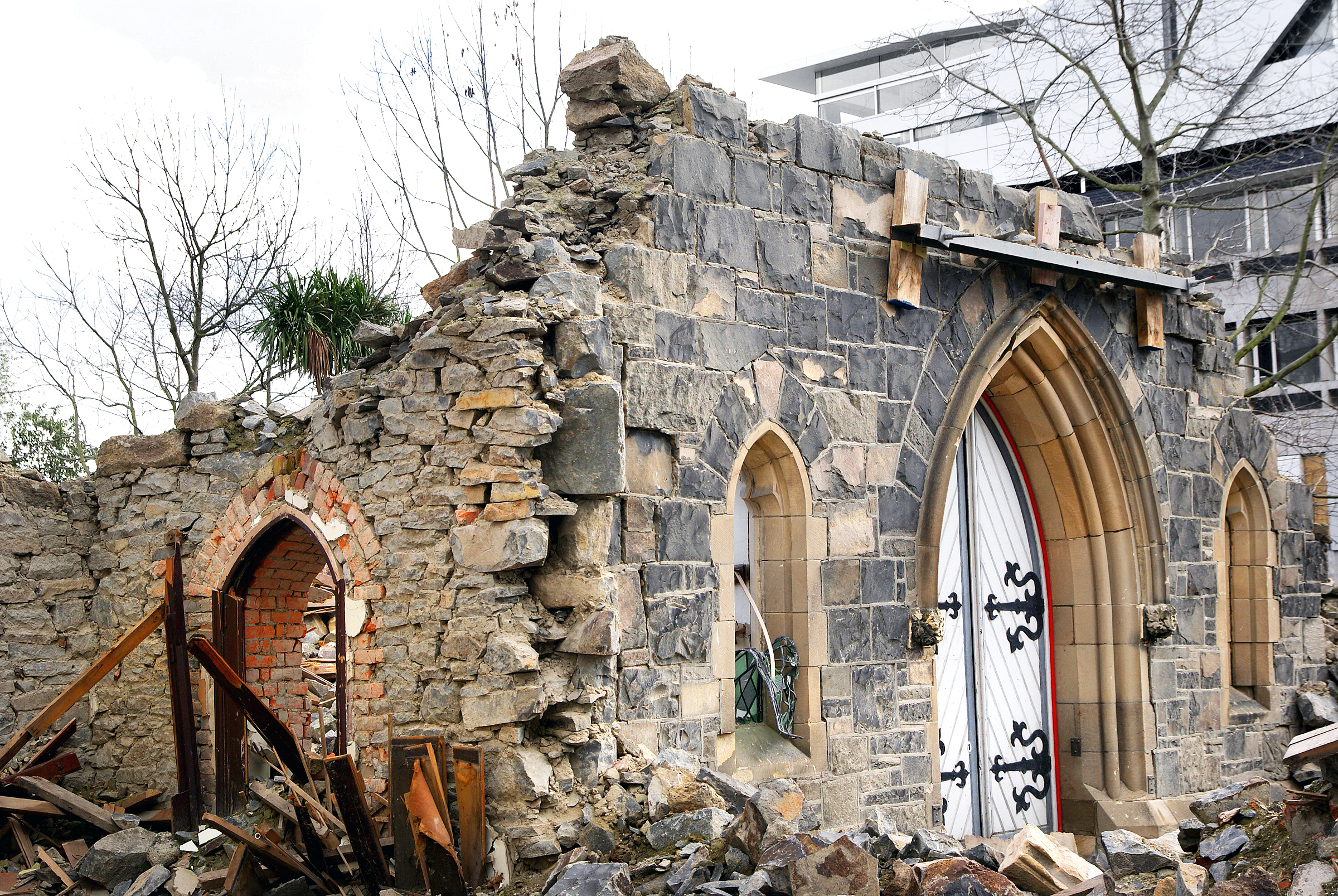
Ruins of the church in June 2011
