= Opawa =

Suburb of Christchurch, New Zealand

- Suburb
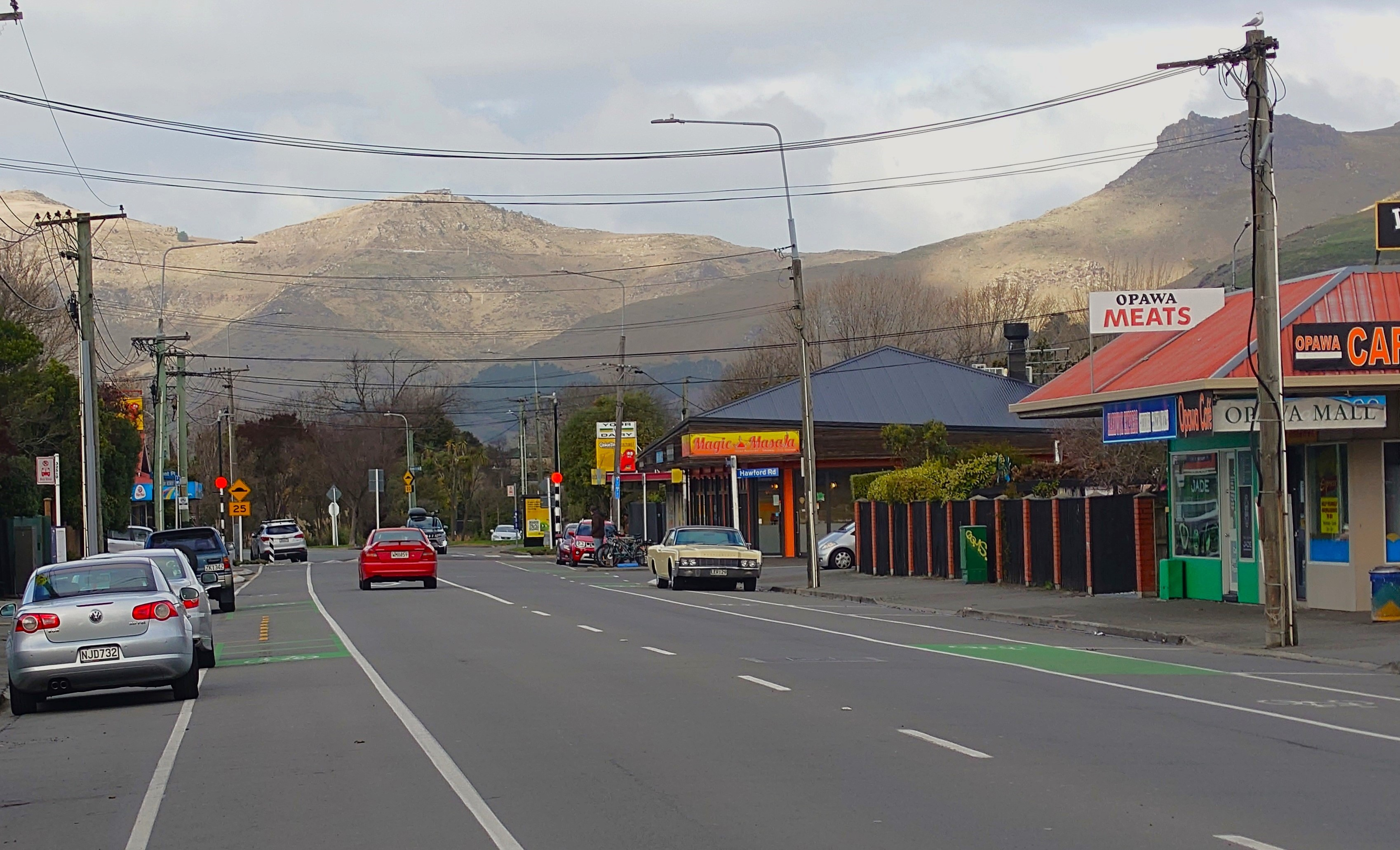
- Main retail area on Opawa Road, looking south-east towards Mount Cavendish
- Interactive map of Opawa
- Coordinates: 43.551342°S 172.661937°E
- Country: New Zealand
- City: Christchurch
- Local authority: Christchurch City Council
- Electoral ward: Heathcote
- Community board: Waihoro Spreydon-Cashmere-Heathcote
- Established: c. 1860s

Area
  - Land: 81 ha (200 acres)

Population (June 2025)
  - Total: 1,400
  - Density: 1,700/km^{2} (4,500/sq mi)

| Waltham | | Woolston |
| | Opawa |
| St. Martins | | Hillsborough |

Opawa (/oʊpɑːwɑː/; Māori: Ōpāwaho) is an inner residential suburb of Christchurch, New Zealand. It is located approximately 3.5 kilometres (2.2 miles) south-east of the city centre. Prior to European settlement, much of the area consisted of marshlands and mixed-use vegetation. By the 1850s, the area was sparsely populated by settlers and became a dairying locality, with many of the early settlers being farmers and people of English descent. Opawa had little development in its early years as it transitioned into a residential suburb.

An early sign of an emerging European community in the area was the arrival of Rev. William Willock, an early settler area who built a cottage titled "Opawaha Cottage", a reference to the Māori name of the area. Another early European settler, Joshua Strange Williams, abbreviated his property as "Opawa Farm". Opawa, eventually became the recognised name for the area. As Woolston emerged as an industrial hub nearby, Opawa was heavily urbanised. This transformed it into an upscale residential area with a population largely consisting of factory workers and businesspeople. Opawa and its neighbouring suburb of Hillsborough were also formerly home to multiple brickmaking and clay related-industries. Though the suburb is predominantly residential at present time, and lies mostly within a U-shaped bend of the Ōpāwaho / Heathcote River. Opawa was amalgamated in to the Greater-Christchurch city area in October 1916.

At a national level, the suburb is part of the Christchurch Central parliamentary electorate. Locally, it is part of the Heathcote Ward for local body elections. The suburb contains three primary schools and two kindergartens. The suburb is home to the Opawa Lawn Tennis Club, established in 1907. The Opawa Bowling Club was established in 1908 and later closed. Additional sporting amenities are located in Hansen Park which accommodates two rugby fields, two football fields and the clubrooms of a local athletics club.

Its population largely consists of European New Zealanders, and contains numerous landmarks known for their connection with the early settlers in the area. Notable individuals associated with the suburb include politician William Pember Reeves, wartime women's labour administrator Noeline Baker, and Anthony Wilding, one of New Zealand's most successful tennis players.

== Toponymy ==
The toponymy of 'Opawa' is an anglicisation and an abbreviation of the Māori name for the area, Ōpāwaho, a name it shares with its neighbouring river. Ōpāwaho is a combination of Ō which means 'a part of' and pā and waho which means 'outer' or 'outside a defined area'. Ōpawaho could also translate to 'the seawards pā' or 'an outpost pā'. The first anglicised names of Ōpāwaho were 'Oparia' and 'Oporia' first seen used in April 1844, though these spellings are no longer in common usage. Another archaic spelling for the area is 'Opawaha', used in the 1850s. The anglicised name, 'Opawa', was first known to be used by early European settler Joshua Strange Williams to address his property. The name, Opawa, was first known to the Lyttelton Times in 1862.

== History ==
=== Māori settlement ===
Māori began to settle in the Christchurch area in 1250 AD and Māori settlements were scattered throughout the area. A kāinga was located near the present-day Vincent Place and Judge Street intersection. It was also a resting place for travellers between Kaiapoi Pā and the Banks Peninsula. The land in this area was marshy and covered with raupō and tussock. Māori lived in the marshy regions of Opawa and used its surrounding swamplands, creeks and the river as an abundant food source of duck (pārera), lamprey (kanakana) and eels (tuna).

The name of the Māori kāinga itself was Poho-Areare (meaning 'piegon breasted'). It is also the name of an early rangatira (chief) of the settlement and the name is also applied to an old Māori walking track that led from the village over the sandhills to the kāinga in South New Brighton (Te Kai-a-Te-Karoro). Later, Tūrakipō was the Opawa settlement's chief. A hapū of Ngāi Tahu built the Poho-Areare village in the 18th century and the name given to this hapū was Ō-Roto-Repo meaning 'swamp dwellers'.

In 1927, a local resident of Opawa "Mr. Rees", discovered a skull and some bones, which are believed to be those of a Māori person. A piece of pounamu (greenstone) was also discovered at the site near the Poho-Areare settlement, beside the Ōpāwaho / Heathcote River. Mr. Rees's discovery could indicate the area could have been a tapu (sacred) burial site for Māori.

=== European settlement ===
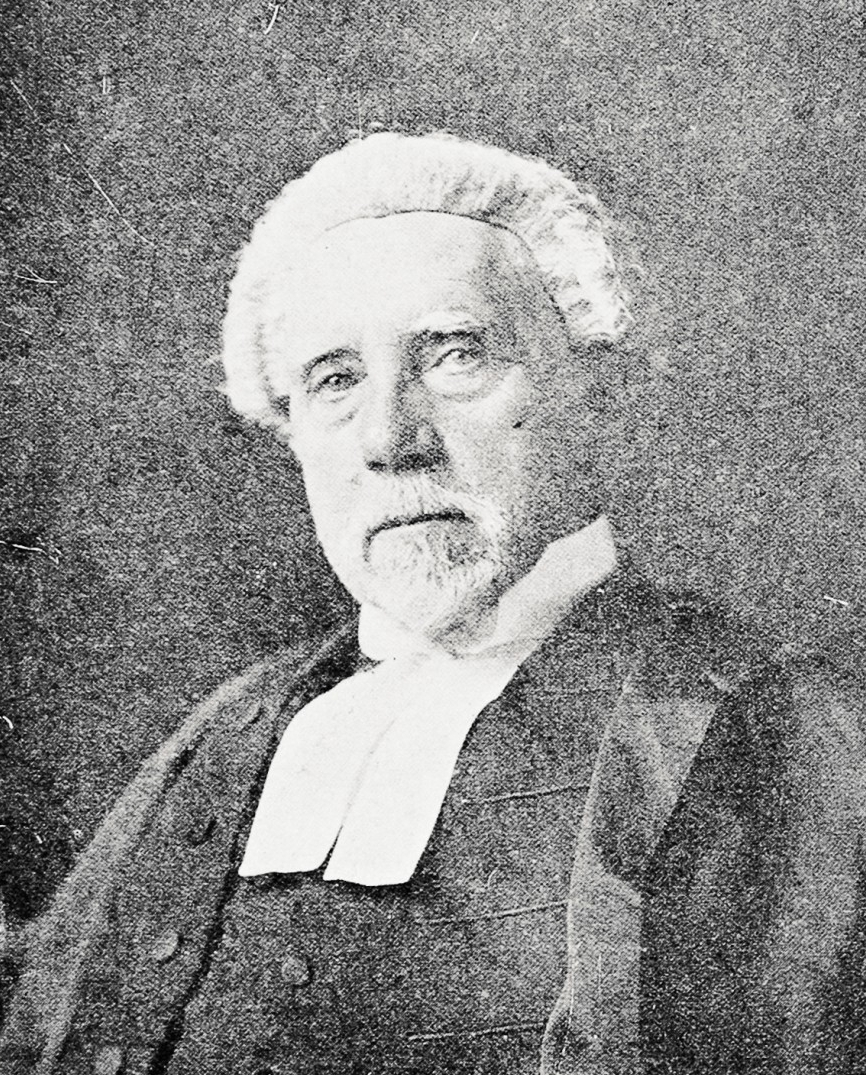
Joshua Strange Williams, named his farm 'Opawa', originating from the Māori name for the area Ōpāwaho.

Early European settlement began in the 1850s and Opawa sparsely populated by European (Pākehā) settlers and the area south of modern-day suburbs Linwood and Woolston became an agricultural (dairying) locality. An early sign of an emerging European community in the area was the arrival of Rev. William Willock, an early settler in the Canterbury Region who arrived to Lyttelton Harbour on the Randolph in 1850. Willock built a cottage (located much closer to St. Martins hill than present day Opawa) and used to hold church services at his home, known as "Opawaha Cottage". His cottage was still standing in Albert Terrace 100 years later and was used as a stable. Willock Place in St. Martins is named in honour of him.

St. Martins, Hillsborough, and Murray Ansyley Hill were originally parts of Opawa, before the districts began to acquire an importance of being their own. Many settlers in Opawa were farmers and people of English descent, many of whom came from relatively wealthy families. Prominent early European settlers in the Opawa district included Edward Richardson, Edward Steane Harley, and Thomas Tancred.

Various names represented the area (such as Opawako and Opawaha) until 1862, when an early European settler, Joshua Strange Williams, addressed his 50 acres (20 ha) property as "Opawa Farm" to the Lyttelton Times. "Opawa" eventually becoming the recognised name for the area.

A number of opulent houses were initially built on large sections and was considered a desirable suburb at the time because of its location surrounded by the Ōpāwaho / Heathcote River, which attracted many to settle here. Opawa developed little during its early years in becoming a residential suburb, the centre of the locality was reportedly the corner of Locarno Street and Opawa Road. Opawa was established around a U-shaped bend of the Ōpāwaho / Heathcote River. Up until the 1890s, the only regular means of transportation, was a stagecoach which ran along Opawa Road.

As Woolston emerged as an industrial hub nearby and became the centre of the country's rubber industry in the 20th century, the population of Opawa grew considerably, transforming it into a fashionable residential area. Subsequently, Opawa was urbanised as factory workers and businesspeople from Woolston's industrial areas relocated after being unable to find housing within Woolston itself.

A number of brickmaking and clay industries were formerly based in Opawa, Hillsborough and the surrounding hills, which contributed in the industrial development of Christchurch.

Opawa suffered some damage in the 2010 Canterbury earthquake. A section of shops along Opawa Road had been closed due to the damage, while the other shops remained operating as usual, and several homes had been damaged by collapsing chimneys. In the February 2011 earthquake, two churches in the suburb had some structural and surface damages.

== Geography ==
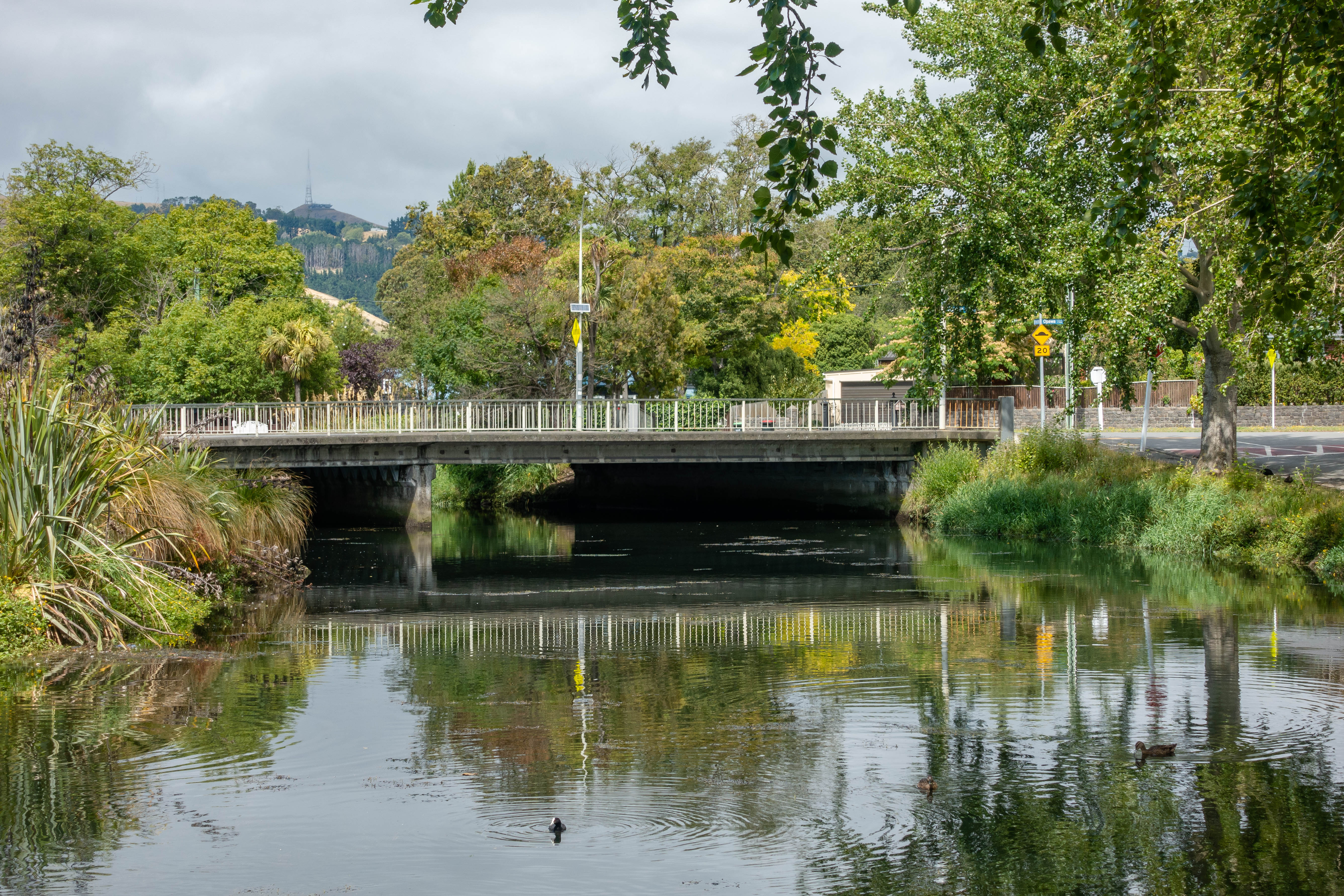
The Opawa Road Bridge over the Ōpāwaho / Heathcote River

In the 19th century, much of the area consisted of grasslands and mixed-use vegetation. Its surroundings largely consisted of marshlands and swamplands which were heavily connected to the ecosystem of the Ōpāwaho / Heathcote River. At present time, State Highway 76 (Brougham Street) and the Main South Line traverses through the suburb. Other suburbs nearby include, Murray Aynsley Hill, Huntsbury, St. Martins, Waltham, Hillsborough, and Linwood. Most of Opawa lies within a U-shaped bend in the Ōpāwaho / Heathcote River.

Opawa's proximity to the river has resulted in numerous flooding incidents in the area. Notable instances of significant flooding in the area occurred in August 1941, April 1962, and January 1980. In 1986, the Woolston Cut began to allow flood waters to bypass a long loop of the Ōpāwaho / Heathcote River. In recent times, noted flooding incidents in Opawa occurred in 2014 and 2017. The suburb's main roads are Opawa Road and Ensors Road, and the suburb's main retail precinct is centred on Opawa Road, which was developed on one of the earliest settled routes, at the intersection of Hawford and Reeves Roads. Opawa Road is no longer the primary thoroughfare through to Lyttelton and Heathcote Valley.

== Landmarks ==
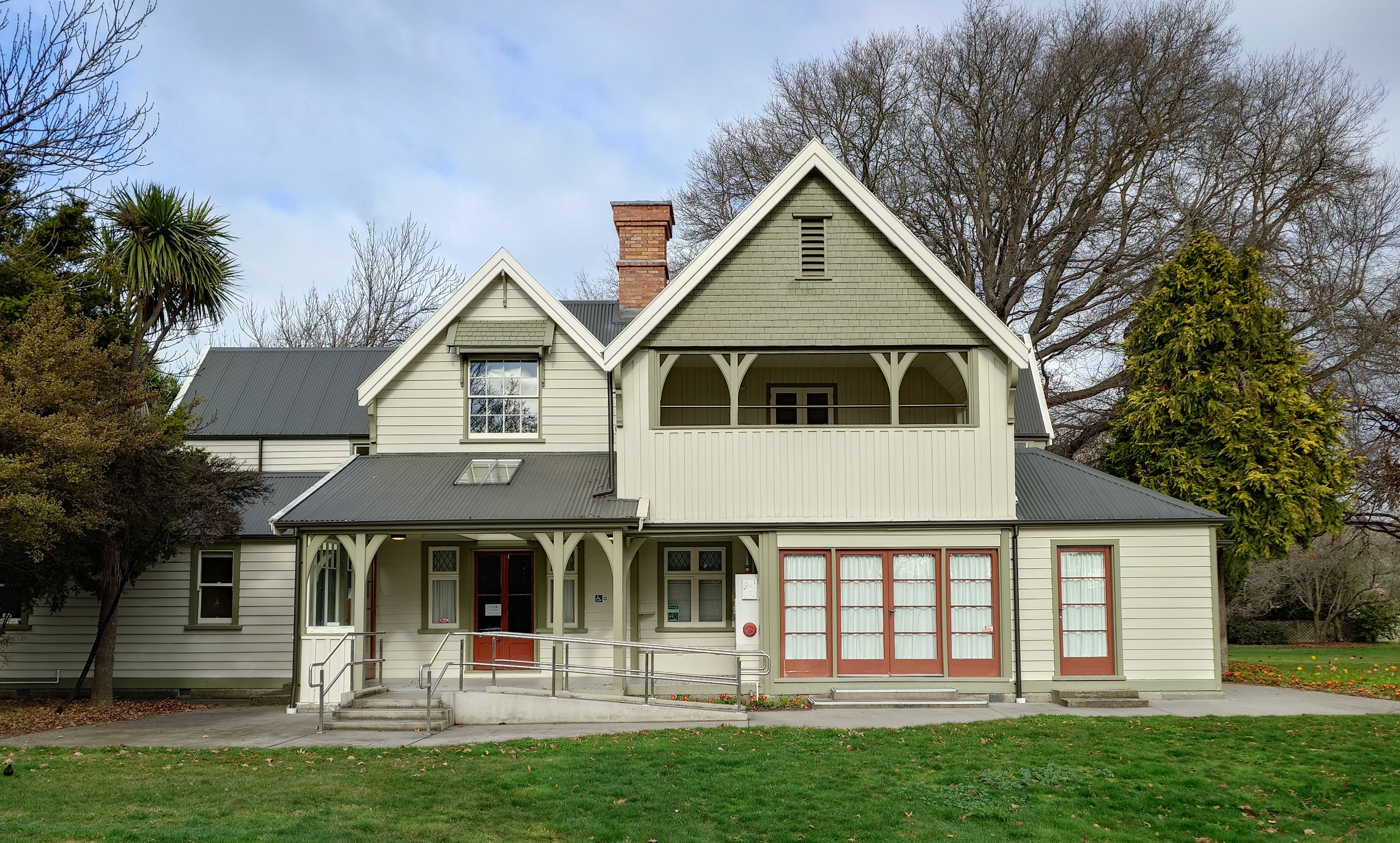
Risingholme (July 2024)

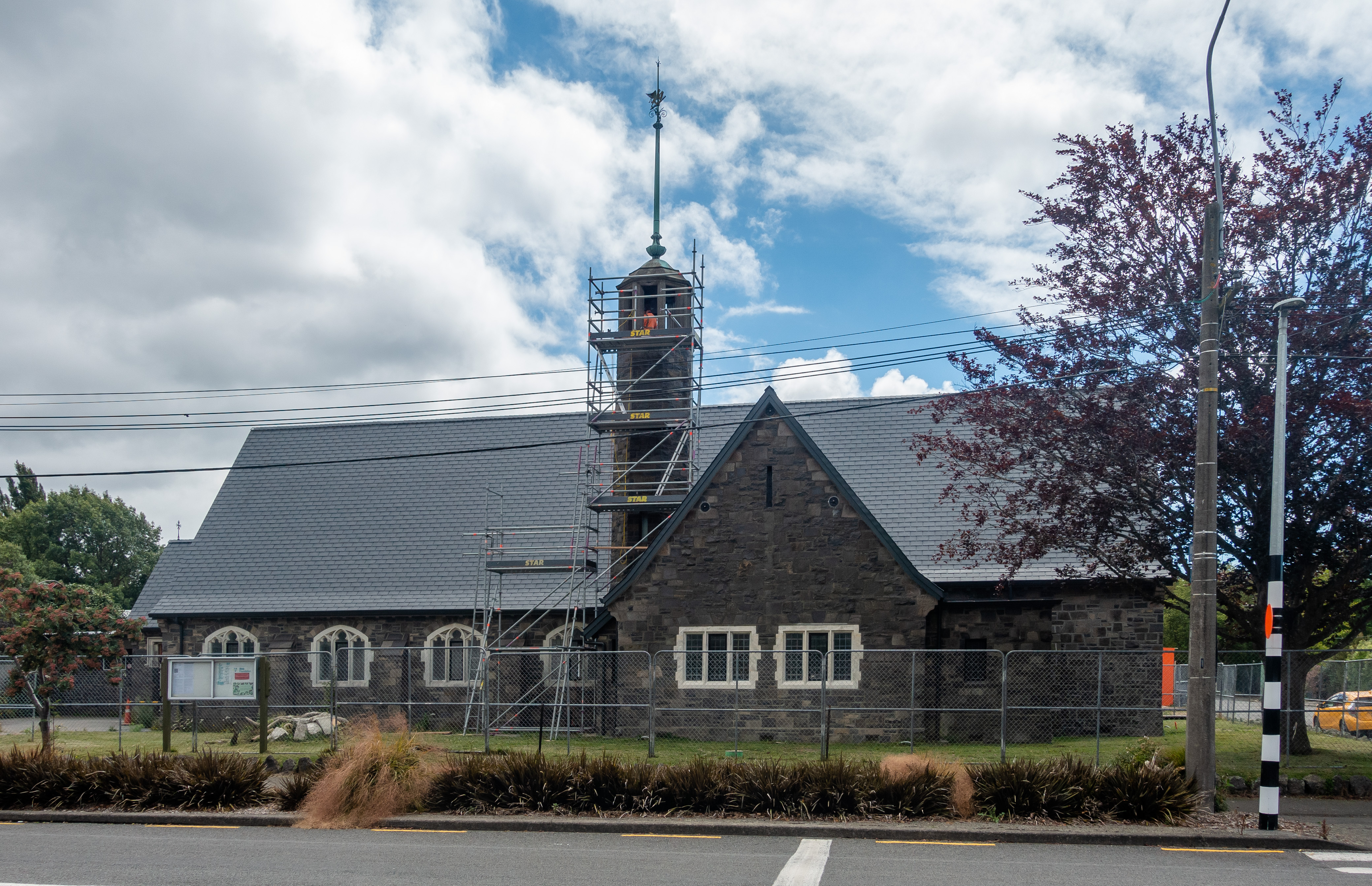
St. Marks Church (February 2022)

Opawa contains several landmarks and locations of historical interest, known for their connection with the early European settlers in the area:

- Risingholme, a Victorian homestead built in 1864 by European settlers Mary and William Reeves. Up until 1943, the building was owned by several private owners. It was later purchased by philanthropist John McKenzie in 1943. The building was gifted to the community for the "health, amusement and instruction of the public". A community centre was established here in 1944. It has a Category 2 listing with Heritage New Zealand.
- Another place of historical interest is an untitled house located on 41 Opawa Road. The section was taken up in 1851 by early settler William Draper. Later in 1852, Alexander Sherwood Jackson bought the land. Later selling it to another settler, J. S. Williams the same year. A businessman, William Wombwell Charters, built a house here in 1879. Opawa was a considered a desirable suburb at the time with lots of "gentlemen's estates". The house has strong window elements and is fairly "French" in its character. Its location was formerly adjacent to the Opawa Farm.
- The Hollies was built in 1871, it is an early colonial house built by English-born mechanic Edward Richardson. The land it was built on was originally part of the 50 acre Opawa Farm, the site of The Hollies was later sold to Mr. Richardson. Richardson was responsible for overseeing the completion of the Lyttelton rail tunnel. Richardson was born in England where he trained as a civil engineer before emigrating to Christchurch. At the farther end of the house, is a billiards room which overlooks the Ōpāwaho / Heathcote River. The Hollies is a Category 2 heritage-listed building.
- St. Mark's Anglican Church is an Anglican church located on Opawa Road. Its foundation stone was laid in May 1865 by Bishop Selwyn, the first Primate of New Zealand and the first church itself was designed by English-born architects Benjamin Mountfort and Maxwell Bury. In December 1949, the church was largely burned by a fire. This severance with the church for many people was one of the few remaining links to Christchurch's early European settlers. A new church was constructed on the same site and opened four years later in 1953.
- Another landmark in Opawa is the Fifield located on 14 Hawford Road. It is unclear what exact year the Fifield was built but it is understood to have been in the early 1880s. The building is historically significant for its connection with civil engineer William Bray and pharmacist William Townend and his family. It is a large two storey mid-Victorian villa, that contains a smoking room, a nursery, and a servants' quarters. After the 2010–2011 Canterbury earthquakes, the dwelling's chimneys partially collapsed and were removed as a result.

== Gallery ==
Gallery of the suburb

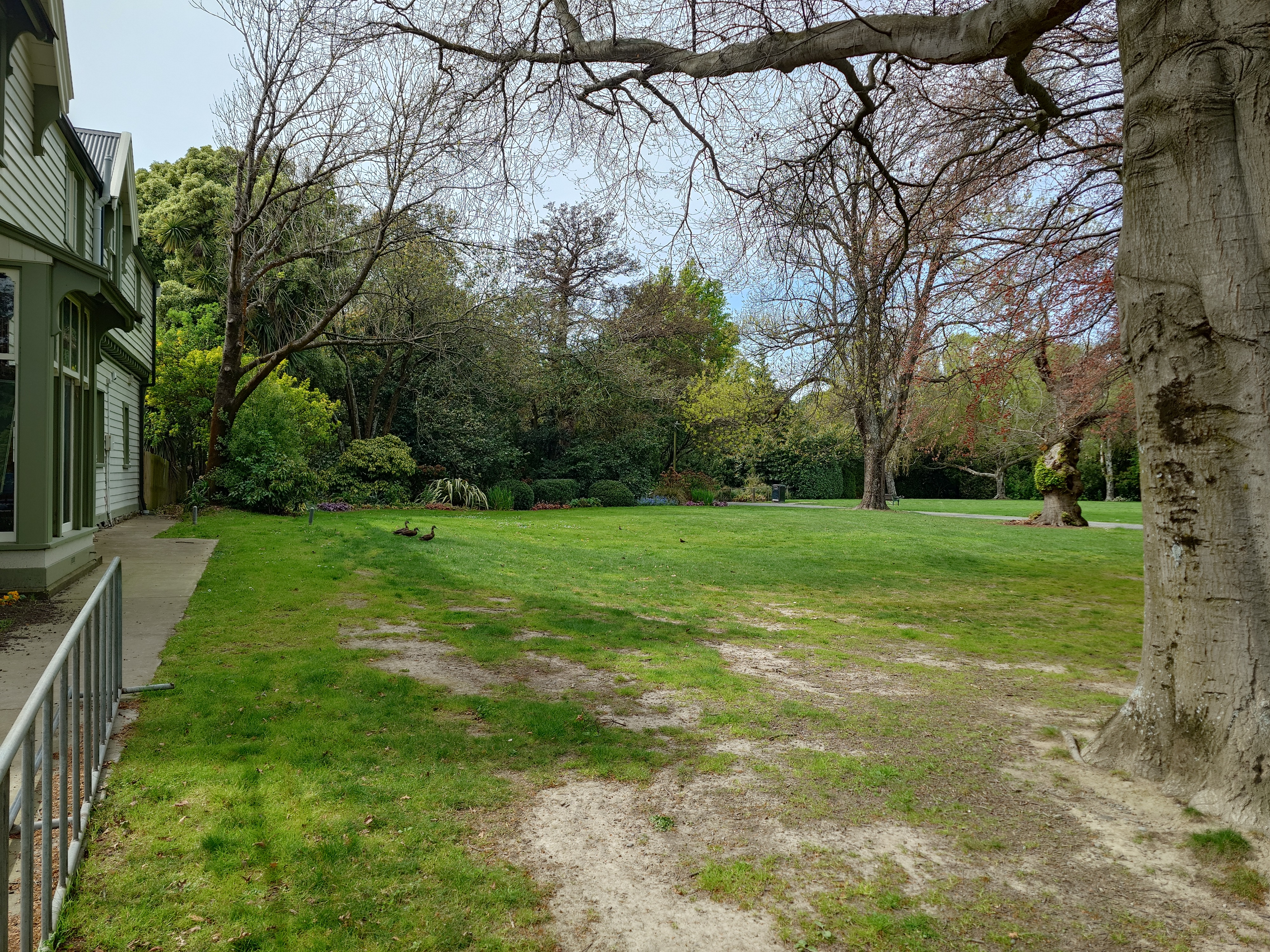
Risingholme Park

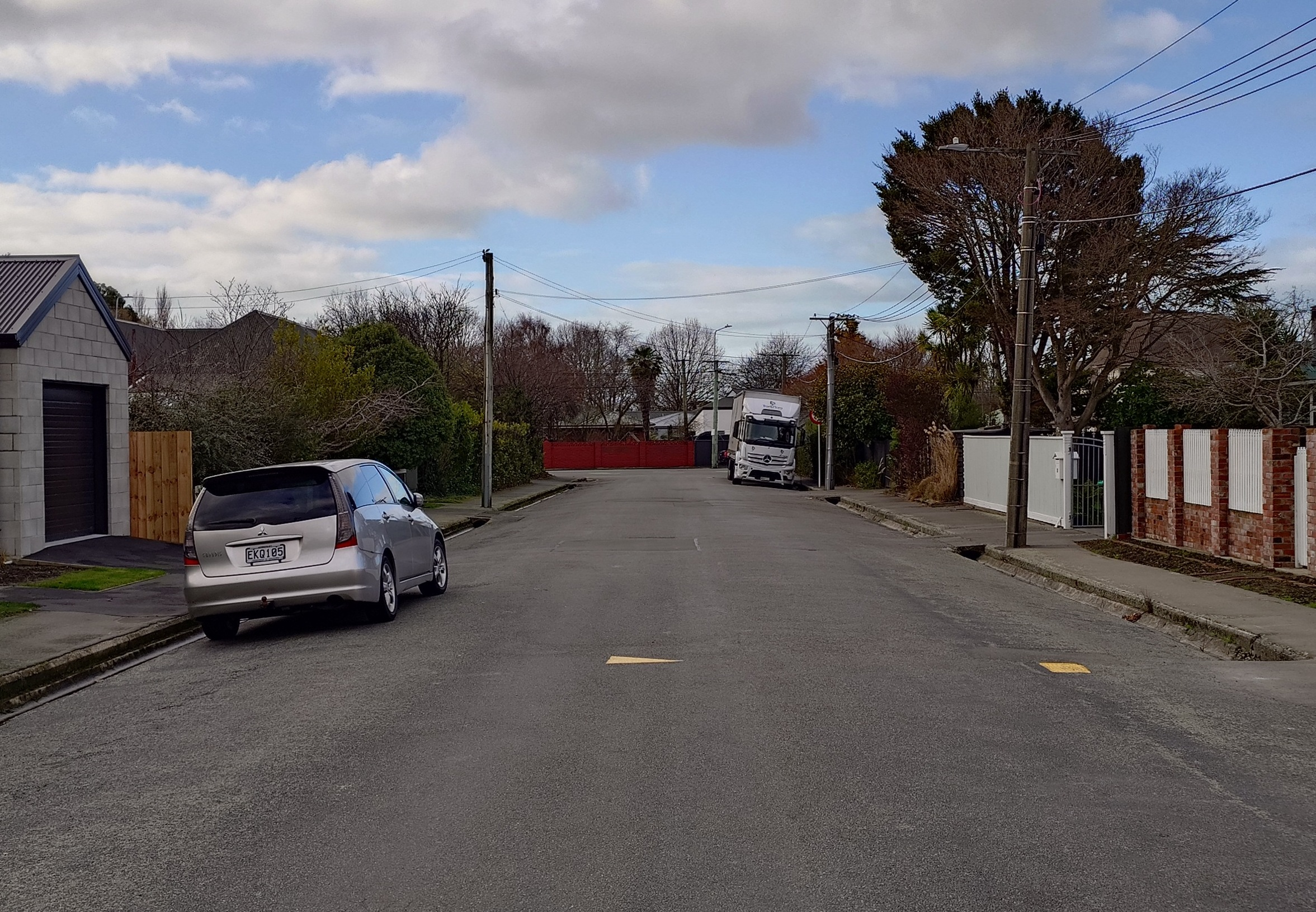
Reeves Road

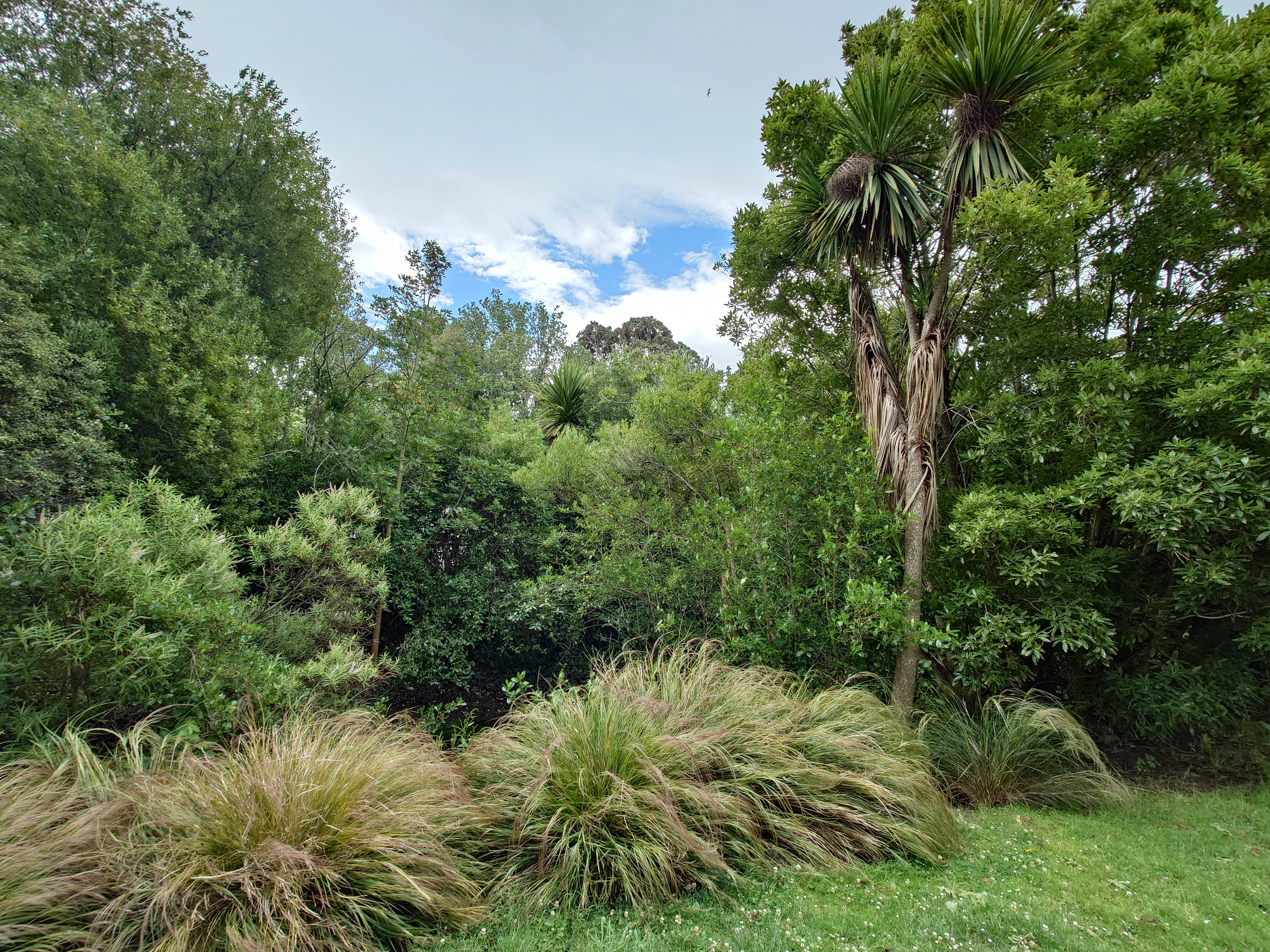
Vegetation near a stream beside the Ōpāwaho / Heathcote River

== Governance ==
Opawa was first part of the no longer existing Heathcote County Council, and was later incorporated in to the Greater-Christchurch city area in October 1916. Its neighbouring suburb of Woolston remained a self-governing borough until amalgamation with the city in November 1921. The Christchurch City Council currently administers Opawa, and it is part of the Heathcote Ward for Christchurch City Council local body elections. As of 2024, the current city councillor is Sara Templeton. At a national level, Opawa is part of the Christchurch Central parliamentary electorate. As of 2024, the current member of parliament (MP) is Duncan Webb of the Labour Party.

== Demographics ==
Opawa covers 0.81 km^{2} (0.31 sq mi). It had an estimated population of 1,400 as of June 2025, with a population density of 1,728 people per km^{2}.

Historical population
| Year | Pop. | ±% p.a. |
|---|---|---|
| 2006 | 1,434 | — |
| 2013 | 1,302 | −1.37% |
| 2018 | 1,365 | +0.95% |
| 2023 | 1,398 | +0.48% |

Opawa had a population of 1,398 in the 2023 New Zealand census, an increase of 33 people (2.4%) since the 2018 census, and an increase of 96 people (7.4%) since the 2013 census. There were 699 males, 696 females, and 6 people of other genders in 552 dwellings. 3.4% of people identified as LGBTIQ+. The median age was 47.6 years (compared with 38.1 years nationally). There were 213 people (15.2%) aged under 15 years, 189 (13.5%) aged 15 to 29, 642 (45.9%) aged 30 to 64, and 354 (25.3%) aged 65 or older.

People could identify as more than one ethnicity. The results were 89.5% European (Pākehā); 11.2% Māori; 1.5% Pasifika; 4.3% Asian; 1.1% Middle Eastern, Latin American and African New Zealanders (MELAA); and 2.4% other, which includes people giving their ethnicity as "New Zealander". English was spoken by 97.4%, Māori by 2.6%, Samoan by 0.4%, and other languages by 8.8%. No language could be spoken by 2.1% (e.g. too young to talk). New Zealand Sign Language was known by 0.6%. The percentage of people born overseas was 23.4, compared with 28.8% nationally.

Religious affiliations were 32.2% Christian, 0.4% Hindu, 0.6% Māori religious beliefs, 0.9% Buddhist, 0.4% New Age, and 0.9% other religions. People who answered that they had no religion were 58.8%, and 6.0% of people did not answer the census question.

Of those at least 15 years old, 390 (32.9%) people had a bachelor's or higher degree, 522 (44.1%) had a post-high school certificate or diploma, and 273 (23.0%) people exclusively held high school qualifications. The median income was $36,000, compared with $41,500 nationally. 162 people (13.7%) earned over $100,000 compared to 12.1% nationally. The employment status of those at least 15 was 504 (42.5%) full-time, 174 (14.7%) part-time, and 24 (2.0%) unemployed.

== Education ==
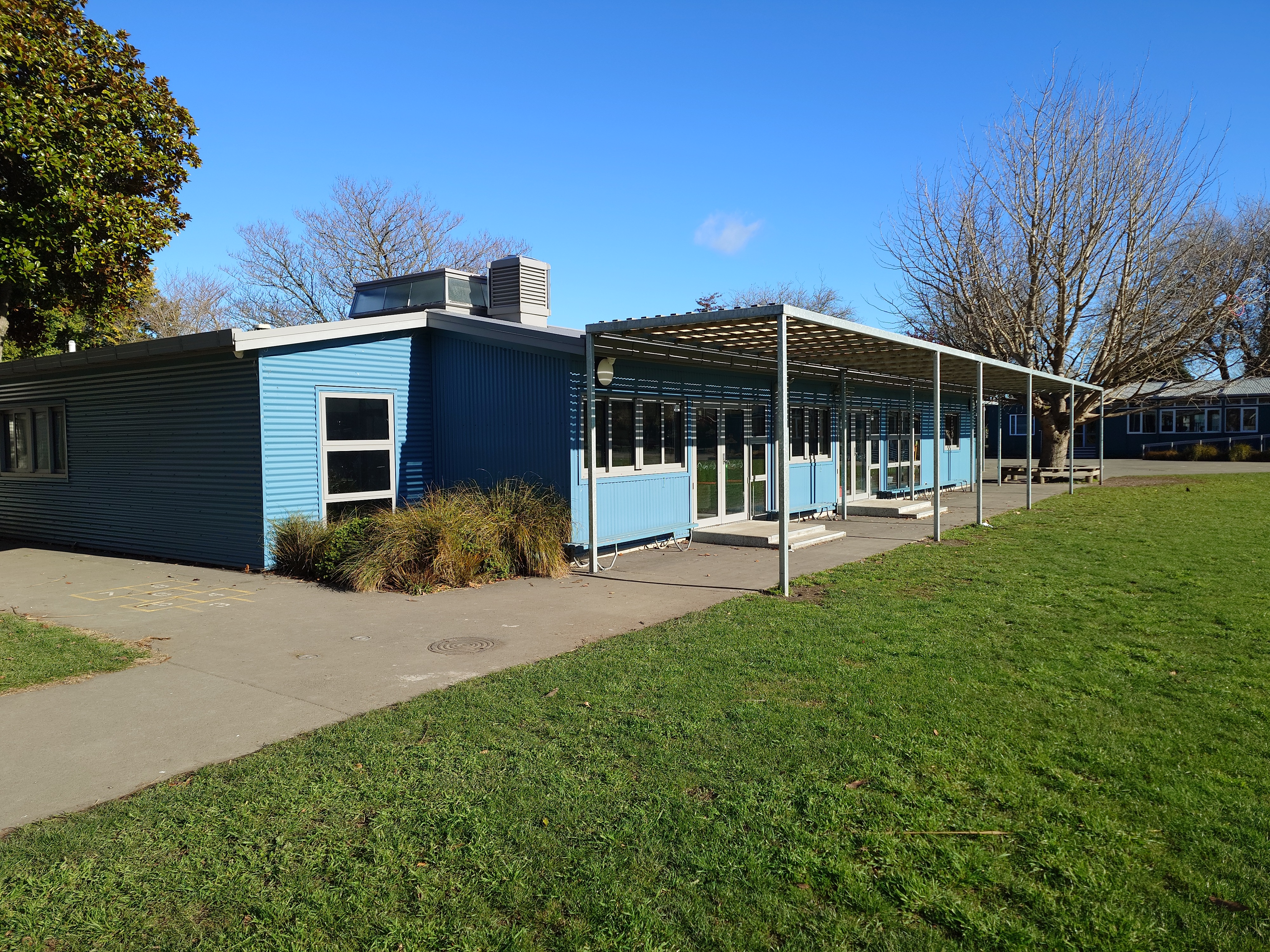
A classroom building in Opawa School (July 2024)

Opawa contains no secondary schools, although it does contain three primary schools and two kindergartens. Opawa School located on Ford Road is one of the oldest schools in North Canterbury which was established in 1872. At the present time, Opawa School is a full-primary school for years 1 to 8, with a roll of 367 students.

Another school in Opawa is the Christchurch Rudolf Steiner School, it is a state-integrated composite school for years 1 to 13, it is located on Ombersley Terrace and has a roll of 282 students. The school opened in 1975 and became state-integrated in 1989.

The suburb is also home to an Anglican primary school called St Mark's School, a name it shares with St. Mark's Anglican Church which is located on Opawa Road. The school is located on Cholmondeley Avenue and is a state-integrated full primary school for years 1 to 8. It has a roll of 234 students. All these schools are co-educational. Rolls are as of July 2026. There are two kindergartens in the suburb, one located on Cholmondeley Avenue and another kindergarten located on Butler Street.

== Amenities ==
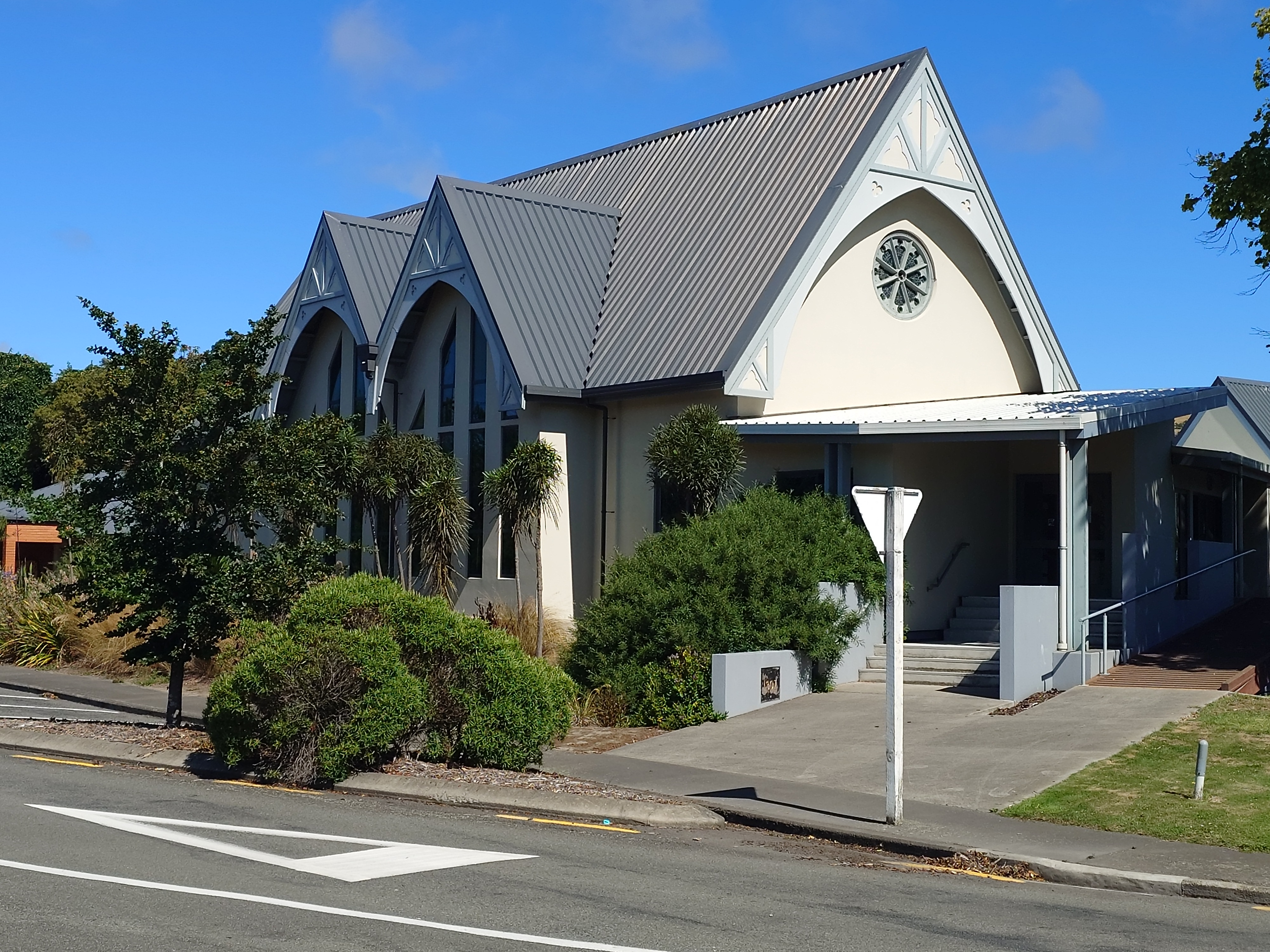
The Opawa Community Church, located at the intersection of Opawa Road and Aynsley Terrace

The Opawa Community Church (formerly known as the Opawa Methodist Church) is another place of worship in the suburb, in addition to Saint Marks Anglican Church on Opawa Road. The Methodist church is located at the intersection of Opawa Road and Aynsley Terrace, and was built in 1907 for the wider Methodist community in Christchurch.

A small park located in the corner of Garlands Road and Opawa Road, called Monro Park is named in honour of Thomas Hugh Erie Monro, a former student of Opawa School. Morno drowned in Waikuku Beach in 1932 and his parents later bought this site and gifted it to the city in honour of his life.

Hansen Park, a recreational area in the suburb, frequently hosts rugby, cricket, and athletics events. It is named in honour of Dr. David Ernest Hansen, recognised for his work in the local community. The area was initially the site of a former landfill site (rubbish dump), there were later plans to transform the landfill site into a recreational park in 1959. Hansen Park includes a playground, two rugby fields, two football fields, and houses the clubrooms of the Port Hills Athletic Club. Another park located in the suburb is Risingholme Park, adjacent to the Risingholme Homestead. A lot of the vegetation in Hansen Park beside the Ōpāwaho / Heathcote River are non-native trees, such as willows, though there has been recent plantings of native vegetation such as, flax (Phormium tenax) and lancewood (Pseudopanax crassifolius) in the park.

Opawa is home to the Opawa Bowling Club and the Opawa Lawn Tennis Club. Both of these sporting clubs have existed in the suburb for over one hundred years, with the Tennis club established in 1908 and the Bowling club established the same year. Another amenity in the suburb is the Opawa Public Library, situated on Richardson Terrace. It was established in 1936 and the building was damaged in the 2011 Christchurch earthquakes. It was subsequently rebuilt. It is run independently to the Christchurch City Council Library Service.

Another amenity located in the suburb is the Alpine Ice Sports Centre located on Brougham Street. It was established in 1985.

== Notable people ==
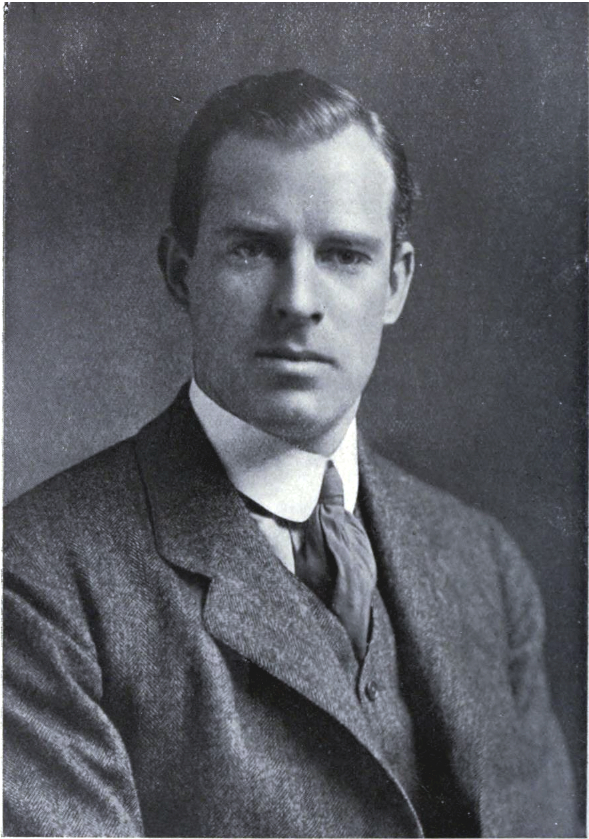
Anthony Wilding (1883–1915), one of New Zealand's most successful tennis players

Notable people with Opawa connections include many of whom were born in the suburb and some were the suburb's early settlers.

- Noeline Baker (1878–1958), an administrator of women's labour in wartime and educator, born in Opawa.
- Alfred William Buxton (1872–1950), a landscape gardener and nurseryman
- John B. Condliffe (1891–1981), an economist and university professor, attended Opawa School.
- John Coster (1838–1886) a businessman and politician
- Margaret Frankel (1902–1997), a painter, printmaker and art teacher
- Otto Frankel (1900–1998), an Austrian-born geneticist
- Kennaway Henderson (1879–1960), an illustrator and cartoonist
- Les Lock (1929–2004) a racing cyclist
- Ivan Mauger (1939–2018), a motorcycle speedway rider, attended Opawa School
- Geoff Ollivier (1886–1960), a tennis player
- Robert Page (1897–1957), an industrial chemist
- William Reeves (1823–1891), a businessman and politician who built in 1864 and resided in a house known as "Risingholme".
- William Pember Reeves (1857–1932), politician, cricketer, and historian
- Edward Richardson (1831–1915), a civil and mechanical engineer
- Ron Talbot (1903–1983), sportsman and representative cricketer
- Mollie Tripe (1870–1939), an artist and art teacher, born in Opawa
- Joshua Strange Williams (1837–1915), a politician and judge, an early settler in Opawa.
- Wilfred Stanley Wallis (1891–1957), an orthopaedic surgeon and chief, born in Opawa.
- Anthony Wilding (1883–1915) is one of New Zealand's most successful tennis players, born in Opawa.
- Cora Wilding (1888–1982), an artist and physiotherapist, born in Opawa.
- Robin Williams (1919–2013), an academic administrator and mathematician

== Works cited ==
- Morrison, J.P. (1948). The evolution of a city: the story of the growth of the city and suburbs of Christchurch, the capital of Canterbury, in the years from 1850 to 1903. Christchurch, New Zealand: Christchurch City Council & Whitcombe and Tombs. OCLC 10562646.
- Tau, T.M.; Goodall, A.; Palmer, D. (1990). Te Whakatau Kaupapa: Ngai Tahu resource management strategy for the Canterbury Region. Wellington, New Zealand: Aoraki Press. ISBN 0473011476.
- Taylor, W.A (2021) [1952]. Lore and history of the South Island Māori. Christchurch, New Zealand: Cadsonbury Publications. ISBN 9781927207024.
- Reed, A. W. (2010). Peter Dowling (ed.). Place Names of New Zealand. Rosedale, North Shore: Raupo. ISBN 978-0-14-320410-7.
- Wilson, John (2005). Contextual Historical Overview of Christchurch City (PDF) (report). Christchurch: Christchurch City Council. ISBN 9781877313219. OCLC 156459064. Archived (PDF) from the original on 1 February 2023 – via Canterbury Earthquakes Royal Commission.
- Gillespie, Noel (2007). Opawa: The Outpost on the Banks of the Heathcote: The Colourful History of One of Christchurch's Oldest Settlements. Christchurch, New Zealand: N. Gillespie. ISBN 9780473124045.
- Ogilvie, Gordon (2017). Place Names of Banks Peninsula and the Port Hills. Christchurch, New Zealand: Canterbury University Press. ISBN 9781927145937.
- Ogilvie, Gordon (2009). The Port Hills of Christchurch. Christchurch, New Zealand: Phillips & King Publishers. ISBN 9780958331562.
- Rice, Geoffrey (2008). Christchurch Changing: An Illustrated History (2nd ed.). Christchurch: Canterbury University Press. ISBN 978-0-908812-53-0.
- Hendry, J A (1969). Homes of the Pioneers. Christchurch, New Zealand: Caxton Press.
- Platts, Una (1980). Nineteenth Century New Zealand Artists (PDF). Christchurch, New Zealand: Avon Fine Prints. Archived (PDF) from the original on 10 March 2018.
- Hamilton, Judith (2008). Early Churches in and Around Christchurch. Christchurch, New Zealand: J. and D. Hamilton. ISBN 9780473131128.
- Owen, S.J. (1992). The Estuary Where Our Rivers Meet the Sea Christchurch's Avon-Heathcote Estuary and Brooklands Lagoon. Christchurch City Council. ISBN 9780473015954.
- Holland, R. C. (1972). Opawa School Centennial Celebrations, 1872-1972 : Labour Weekend, October, 1972. Christchurch, New Zealand: Griffin Press Ltd. OCLC 153709351.
- Georgantis, Anthony (1965). A Short History of S. Mark's Church Opawa 1865–1965. Simpson & Williams Ltd. p. 6–7. Archived from the original on 19 June 2024.
- Coles, David (2003). Cottage To Church In St. Martins 1853-2003. Christchurch, New Zealand: St. Annes Church, St. Martins.
- Grant, Liz (2005). Walking Christchurch: 22 walks of discovery in and around Christchurch. Christchurch, New Zealand: New Holland Publishers. pp. 76–77. ISBN 9781869660703.
- Watson, James (1989). Along The Hills A History of the Heathcote Road Board and the Heathcote County Council 1864–1989. Christchurch, New Zealand: Caxton Press (New Zealand). p. 131. ISBN 9780473008512.
- Anderson, J. C. (1976). Place names of Banks Peninsula. Christchurch, New Zealand: Capper Press.
