= Charles Burns (medical doctor) =

New Zealand medical doctor and administrator

Sir Charles Burns KBE KSG
- Born: 27 May 1898; Blenheim
- Died: 8 February 1985 (aged 86); Auckland
- Occupations: Medical doctor, medical administrator
- Spouse(s): Margaret Muriel Laffey (m. 1935; died 1949) Doris Ogilvy Ramsay (m. 1963; died 1982)

Academic background
- Education: University of Otago (MD)

Academic work
- Discipline: Cardiologist
- Institutions: University of Otago Wellington Hospital

Sir Charles Ritchie Burns KBE (27 May 1898 – 8 February 1985) was a New Zealand medical doctor and medical administrator.

== Early life and education ==
Burns was born in Blenheim, New Zealand, on 27 May 1898, and was educated at Marlborough High School and Nelson College. He studied medicine at the University of Otago graduating MBChB in 1922 and MD in 1925.

== Career ==
After graduating Burns worked mostly at Dunedin Hospital and studied in Britain. He became known for his use of insulin in the treatment of diabetes and raw liver to alleviate pernicious anaemia. In 1938 he became Director of Medicine at Auckland Hospital for two years after which he returned to Wellington as a physician and head of cardiology at Wellington Hospital.

In World War II he served on hospital ships in the New Zealand Medical Corps in the Second New Zealand Expeditionary Force in 1944–1945, then in Italy and as medical officer to the J Force in Japan from 1946 to 1948.

After the war Burns returned to Wellington Hospital. He developed an interest in the treatment of alcoholism becoming medical director at Queen Mary Hospital in Hanmer Springs in 1969. He became clinical director of the National Society on Alcoholism and Drug Dependence.

Burns was active in numerous medical organisations: the RACP, the Medical Council, the Nutrition Society of New Zealand, the Wellington Diabetic Society, the New Zealand Asthma Society, the Lepers’ Trust Board (NZ) and the Wellington Association for Deaf Children.

Burns died in Auckland on 8 February 1985.

== Honours and awards ==
Burns received the War Medal and New Zealand War Service Medal. In the 1948 New Year Honours, Burns was appointed an Officer of the Order of the British Empire. He was promoted to Knight Commander of the same order in the 1958 Queen's Birthday Honours, for services to medicine.

== Publications ==
- Burns, C. R., & Victorian Foundation on Alcoholism Drug Dependence. (1973). Alcoholism : the family disease. Victorian Foundation on Alcoholism and Drug Dependence.
- Burns, C. R., & Nutrition Society of New Zealand. (1977). Some aspects of alcohol use and human nutrition : with special references to the Acute Alcohol Withdrawal Syndrome. Nutrition Society of N.Z.
