= Alexander Gillies =

New Zealand orthopaedic surgeon

Sir Alexander Gillies FRCSEd FRACS
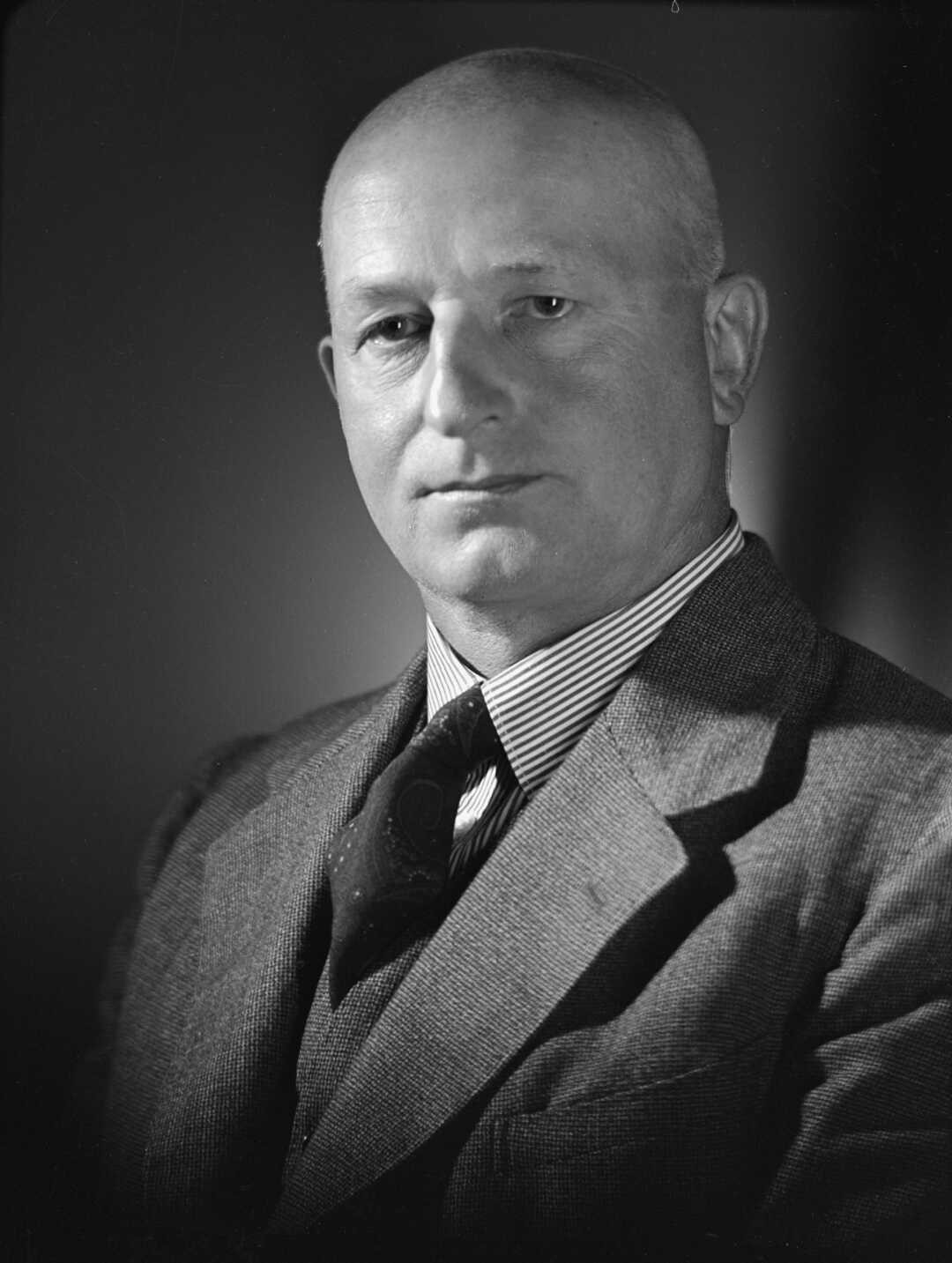
- Born: 28 September 1891; Dunedin, New Zealand
- Died: 19 February 1982 (aged 90); Wellington, New Zealand
- Education: Otago Boys' High School; University of Otago; University of Edinburgh
- Occupation: Orthopaedic surgeon
- Known for: Role in establishing orthopaedics in New Zealand
- Medical career
- Institutions: Wellington Hospital

Sir Alexander Gillies (26 September 1891 – 19 February 1982) was a New Zealand orthopaedic surgeon who played a major role in establishing orthopaedics as a surgical speciality in New Zealand. One of the first to practise hip replacement in New Zealand, he was prominent in the foundation of the New Zealand Orthopaedic Association and became its first president. He was associated with a number of humanitarian causes including the New Zealand Red Cross Society of which he was chairman and latterly president.

== Early life ==
Gillies was born in Dunedin, New Zealand, on 26 September 1891. His father Gilbert Wilson Gillies and his mother, Agnes Gibson had emigrated to New Zealand from Scotland. He was educated at Otago Boys’ High School from where he went on to the University of Otago, Dunedin, where he studied medicine. As an undergraduate, he gained a blue for rugby union. While still a student he was called up for service in the First World War in 1916, serving with the New Zealand expeditionary forces( NCEF) in Egypt, Palestine and Syria. Photographs of his activities during this time are held in the National Library of New Zealand. He was awarded an NCEF scholarship, awarded to demobilised New Zealand soldiers, and this enabled him to study medicine at the University of Edinburgh where he graduated MB ChB in 1923. Three years later he was elected a fellow of the Royal College of Surgeons of Edinburgh (FRCSEd).

== Career ==
Gillies had originally considered specialising in public health but chose instead a career in the developing surgical speciality of orthopaedics. He trained under Sir Robert Jones, one of the leaders in this new speciality. Initially he worked under Jones as assistant orthopaedic surgeon at the Shropshire Orthopaedic Hospital, Oswestry, and at the Royal Southern Hospital, Liverpool. In 1927 he gained further surgical experience at the Mayo Clinic in Rochester, Minnesota with William Mayo and the following year was appointed orthopaedic surgeon at the Lockwood Clinic in Toronto. When he returned to New Zealand in 1929, he was appointed orthopaedic surgeon at Wellington Hospital. He was an enthusiastic supporter of the founding of the Royal Australasian College of Surgeons in 1927 and became a fellow of the College in 1932.

Gillies returned to Liverpool in 1936 to take the degree of Master of Surgery in orthopaedics (MCh Orth) from the University of Liverpool. He returned again to the UK in 1940, acting as resident commissioner for the British Red Cross Society and the Order of St John of Jerusalem.

He was a founder member of the New Zealand Orthopaedic Association and served as its first president. Gillies is remembered for his role in establishing orthopaedics as a surgical speciality in New Zealand. He was among the first to perform hip replacement in New Zealand. He was also devoted to several humanitarian causes such as the New Zealand Red Cross Society of which he became chairman then president. Along with Wilfred Wallis, he helped establish the New Zealand Crippled Children Society and founded the New Zealand Association of Health, Physical Education and Recreation. He became patron of the New Zealand Physical Education Society, which became Physical Education New Zealand (PENZ). In 1953, he was awarded the Queen Elizabeth II Coronation Medal. Gillies was appointed a Knight Bachelor, for services to orthopaedic surgery, in the 1959 Queen's Birthday Honours. His name is commemorated in the Sir Alexander Gillies Gold medal which is awarded for distinguished and outstanding service to PENZ.

== Family ==
Gillies married Effie Lovica Wooler (née Shaw) in Glasgow, Scotland, on 21 September 1920; she died in 1972. Two daughters from that marriage predeceased him. He married Joan Mary Kennedy in 1978 and died in Wellington on 19 February 1982. His second wife, Joan, Lady Gillies, died in 2025.
