= Pansy Helen Auld Chapman =

Pansy Helen Auld Chapman MBE (24 November 1892 – 6 July 1973) was a New Zealand hospital matron and nursing administrator. She was born in Blacks Point, West Coast, New Zealand, on 24 November 1892.

In the 1948 New Year Honours, Chapman was appointed a Member of the Order of the British Empire.
