= 1948 New Year Honours (New Zealand) =

Annual awards for New Zealanders

The 1948 New Year Honours in New Zealand were appointments by King George VI on the advice of the New Zealand government to various orders and honours to reward and highlight good works by New Zealanders, and to celebrate the passing of 1947 and the beginning of 1948. They were announced on 1 January 1948.

The recipients of honours are displayed here as they were styled before their new honour.

== Knight Bachelor ==
- The Honourable David Stanley Smith – judge of the Supreme Court, and chancellor of the University of New Zealand.

== Order of Saint Michael and Saint George ==
=== Companion (CMG) ===
- The Right Reverend Frederick Augustus Bennett – of Kohupatiki; Bishop of Aotearoa. For services to the Māori people.
- Dr Guy Hardy Scholefield OBE DSc – of Wellington; parliamentary librarian and Dominion archivist.
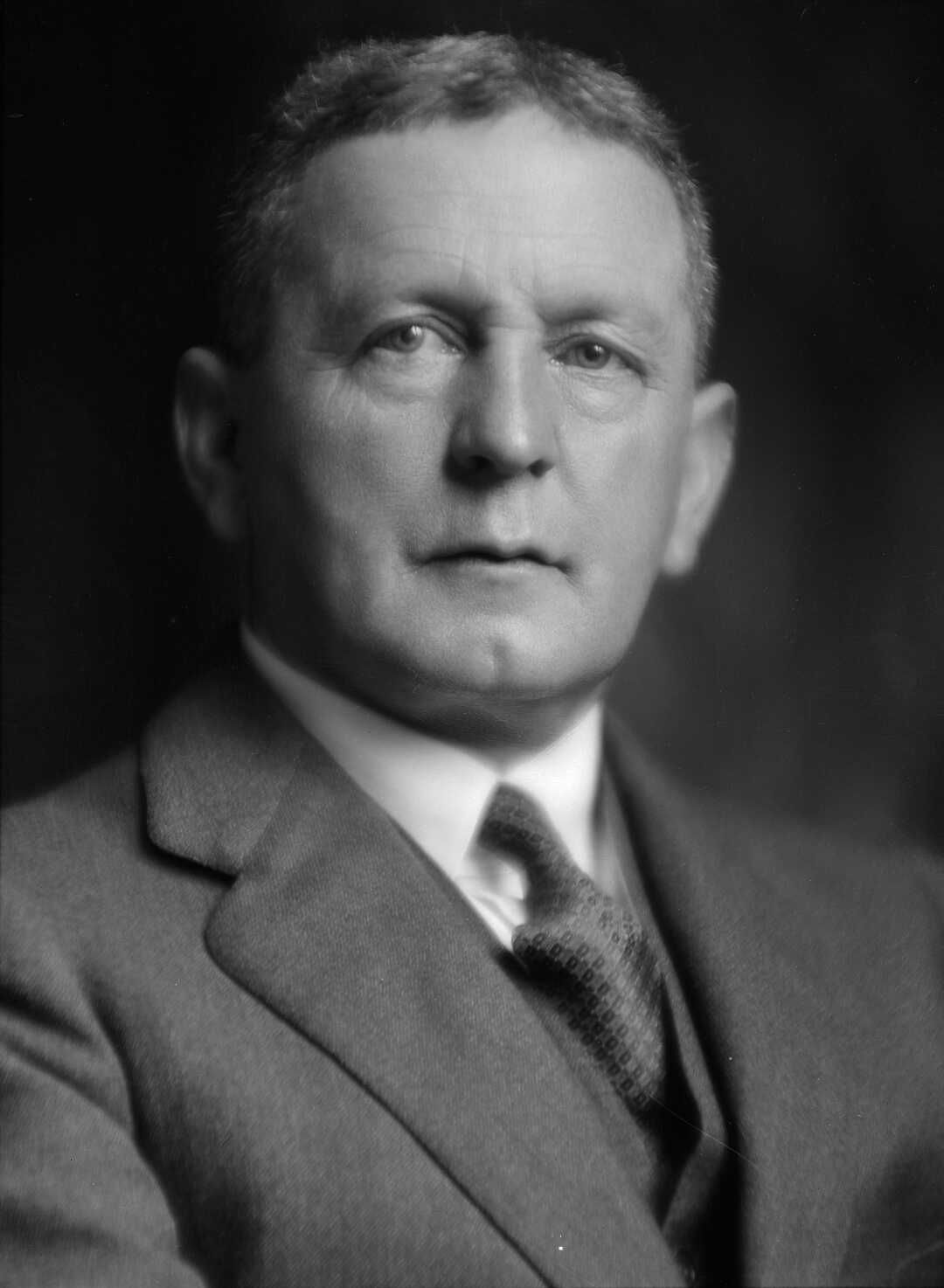
Guy Scholefield

== Order of the British Empire ==
=== Knight Commander (KBE) ===
Civil division

- Joseph Bernard Dawson MD FRCS – professor of midwifery and gynaecology, University of Otago.

=== Commander (CBE) ===
Civil division

- Robert Caughley – of Wellington; formerly general manager of the Alliance Assurance Company in New Zealand. For public services.
- Walter Allison Gilmour MD – of Auckland; pathologist, Auckland Public Hospital.
- John Henderson – of Wellington; formerly director, New Zealand Geological Survey.

Military division

- Group Captain Cyril Eyton Kay OBE DFC – Royal New Zealand Air Force.

=== Officer (OBE) ===
Civil division

- John Barr – of Auckland; chief librarian and director, Public Library, Art Gallery and Old Colonists' Museum, Auckland.
- John Alexander Crawford – of Cairo. For services to the New Zealand Forces in Egypt, 1939–1945.
- Kanapu Haerehuka – of Wanganui. For social welfare services.
- Aileen Annie Joyce – of Auckland; matron, St Helen's Hospital, Auckland.
- Thomas Rowley Lees – of Palmerston North; a member of the National Rehabilitation Council and chairman of the Palmerston North Rehabilitation Committee.
- Mary Letitia Lindsay – of Timaru; matron, Timaru Public Hospital.
- James Murphy – of Christchurch; Dominion vice-president of the Disabled Servicemen's League and president of its Canterbury branch.
- Henry Valder – of Hamilton. For services in promoting industrial relations.
- Wilfred Stanley Wallis MB ChB – of Rotorua. For services to returned ex-servicemen.
- John Wilson – of Dunedin; a member of the Dunedin City Council for many years.

Military division

- Colonel (temporary) Charles Ritchie Burns – 2nd New Zealand Expeditionary Force.
- Lieutenant-Colonel (temporary) John Patrick Joyce DCM – Royal New Zealand Artillery.
- Squadron Leader Noel Alfred Vear – Royal New Zealand Air Force.

=== Member (MBE) ===
Civil division

- Ada Emily Beer – of Gisborne. For patriotic services.
- John Bryce Berry – of Kaikohe. For social welfare services in Northland.
- Pansy Helen Auld Chapman – of Auckland; charge nurse, Auckland Plunket Rooms.
- William Alfred Henry Corfield – of Auckland; constructive manager, His Majesty's New Zealand Dockyard, Auckland.
- Dorothy Louisa Derig – of Auckland. For patriotic and social welfare services.
- John William Fenton – of Kaitangata; formerly mayor of Kaitangata.
- Elsie Louisa Muriel Julius – of Greymouth; sister in charge, maternity annex, Greymouth.
- Kenneth McKenzie – of Geraldine; formerly chairman, Geraldine County Council.
- The Reverend Leslie Bourneman Neale – of Dunedin; formerly president of the Methodist Church of New Zealand, superintendent of the Dunedin Central Mission.
- James Baxter O'Neill – secretary, New Zealand Swimming Association.
- Mirika Wehipeihana – of Ōpunake; district health nurse.
- William Trickey Woods – of Christchurch. For services to ex-servicemen.

Military division

- Acting Telegraphist Lieutenant William Lewis Brewer DSM – Royal New Zealand Navy.
- Lieutenant-Colonel (temporary) John William Barry – New Zealand Regiment.
- Major and Quartermaster Thomas Joseph Cronin – New Zealand Regular Force.
- Major Adam James Moore – New Zealand Regiment.
- Captain John Henry Leedham Trenwith – New Zealand Temporary Staff.
- Flying Officer Richard Langsford Brewer – Royal New Zealand Air Force.
- Warrant Officer Albert Ernest Chapman – Royal New Zealand Air Force.

== British Empire Medal (BEM) ==
Military division

- Electrical Artificer, Fourth Class, Alfred Ernest Crooks – Royal New Zealand Navy.
- Ernest Robert Jackson – canteen tenant, Royal New Zealand Navy.
- Private (temporary Warrant Officer Class I) Donald Hughes Cross – New Zealand Regiment.
- Private (temporary Warrant Officer Class I) David Charles McGill – New Zealand Temporary Staff.
- Private (temporary Staff-Sergeant) Victor James Keane – New Zealand Temporary Staff.
- Flight Sergeant James Robert John Begg – Royal New Zealand Air Force.
- Flight Sergeant Tom Lewis Dimmock – Royal New Zealand Air Force.
- Flight Sergeant William Henry James – Royal New Zealand Air Force.
- Flight Sergeant Basil Frederick White – Royal New Zealand Air Force.

== Air Force Cross (AFC) ==
- Squadron Leader Cyril Henry Baigent DSO DFC – Royal New Zealand Air Force.
- Warrant Officer Douglas Owen Holloway – Royal New Zealand Air Force.
- Flight Lieutenant Alexander McLeod Morgan Thomas – Royal New Zealand Air Force.
- Flight Lieutenant Mervyn Windsor Wrennall – Royal New Zealand Air Force.

== King's Commendation for Valuable Service in the Air ==
- Flying Officer John Duncan Garrett – Royal New Zealand Air Force.
- Warrant Officer Frederick Hazel – Royal New Zealand Air Force.
- Flying Officer Joseph Cassidy Naera – Royal New Zealand Air Force.
- Flight Lieutenant James Patrick O'Donnell – Royal New Zealand Air Force.
- Flight Sergeant Leslie Gordon Woods – Royal New Zealand Air Force.
