= Henry Valder =

New Zealand storekeeper, sawmiller and business reformer

Henry Valder OBE
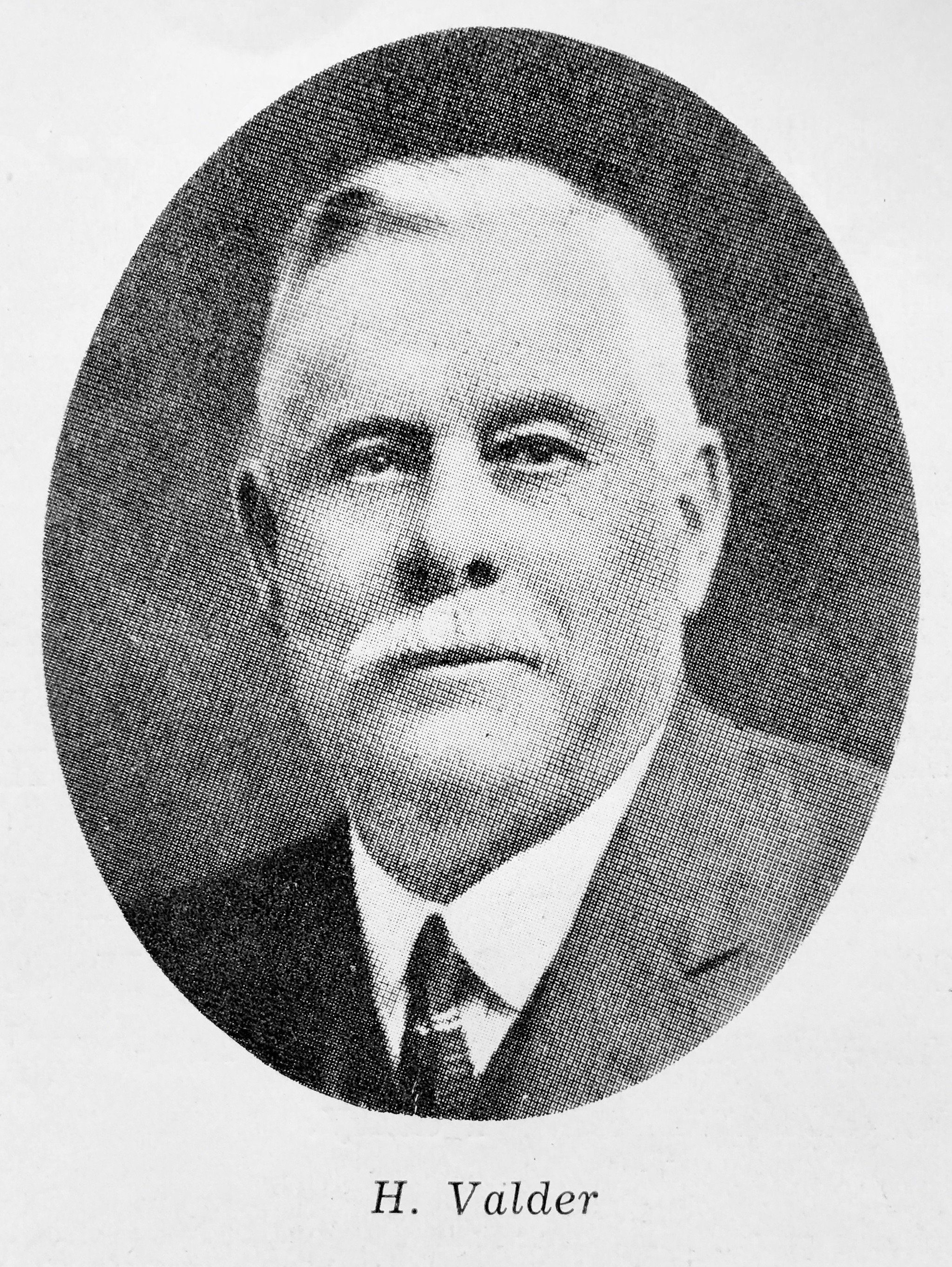
- Born: 14 August 1862; Southampton, Hampshire, England
- Died: 12 February 1950 (aged 87); Edingthorpe, Claudelands, New Zealand
- Spouses: 1. Ellen Green; (m. 1901; died 1931): 2. Marie Herbert (m. 1934)

Henry Valder OBE (14 August 1862 – 12 February 1950) was a New Zealand storekeeper, sawmiller and business reformer.

== Early life ==
Valder was born in Southampton, Hampshire, England, in 1862, the son of Mary Collingridge and George Valder, a corn merchant. He went to a church school in Winchester.

== Business ==
Valder arrived in 1881 and worked as a labourer in the King Country before joining John William Ellis as a partner in his Kihikihi store in 1884. They later set up stores at Ōtorohanga, Tokaanu and Taupō. By the mid 1890s, Valder was managing the general store of Ellis Brothers and Valder at Hunterville, where main trunk railway construction had boosted the local economy. In 1900 he sold his interest in the stores and returned to England, but returned next year.

Valder renewed his business links with J. W. Ellis, becoming managing director of Ellis and Burnand from 1908 until 1932 and chairman of the board from 1918 to 1942. Like Ellis, he had taught himself Māori, gaining his interpreter's licence in 1889. They used their many Māori contacts to acquire rights to fell and mill native bush. Valder was also a long-time district representative and vice president (1917–26) on the Dominion Federated Sawmillers' Association.

== Social work ==
In 1922, Valder promoted industrial partnership by publishing a plan to give employees shares in profits and directors on boards in a co-partnerships. The result was the 1924 Companies Empowering Act. He founded the Employee–Partnership Institute in 1927, but couldn't get enough support from his co-directors to convert Ellis and Burnand to such a model. In 1927 the Waikato and King Country Press (now absorbed by Waitomo News) was one of the few to use the legislation. In 1940 Henry financed a fellowship which produced a 'Report on industrial relations in New Zealand' in 1946.

Valder was also founder president of the Rotary Club of Hamilton in 1923, chaired the Waikato Social Welfare League in 1932, co-founded the Waikato Land Settlement Society and, in 1940, helped Te Puea Herangi buy Turangawaewae.

These works gained him the Reconnaissance française and, in the 1948 New Year Honours, Officer of the Order of the British Empire for services in promoting industrial relations.

== Family life ==
Whilst briefly in England, Valder married Ellen (Nellie) Green on 17 January 1901 at Edingthorpe. Later that year they sailed back to live in Auckland, before moving to Hamilton three years later. They had three daughters, Ellen Mary (Mollie), Norah Winifred and Lilian.

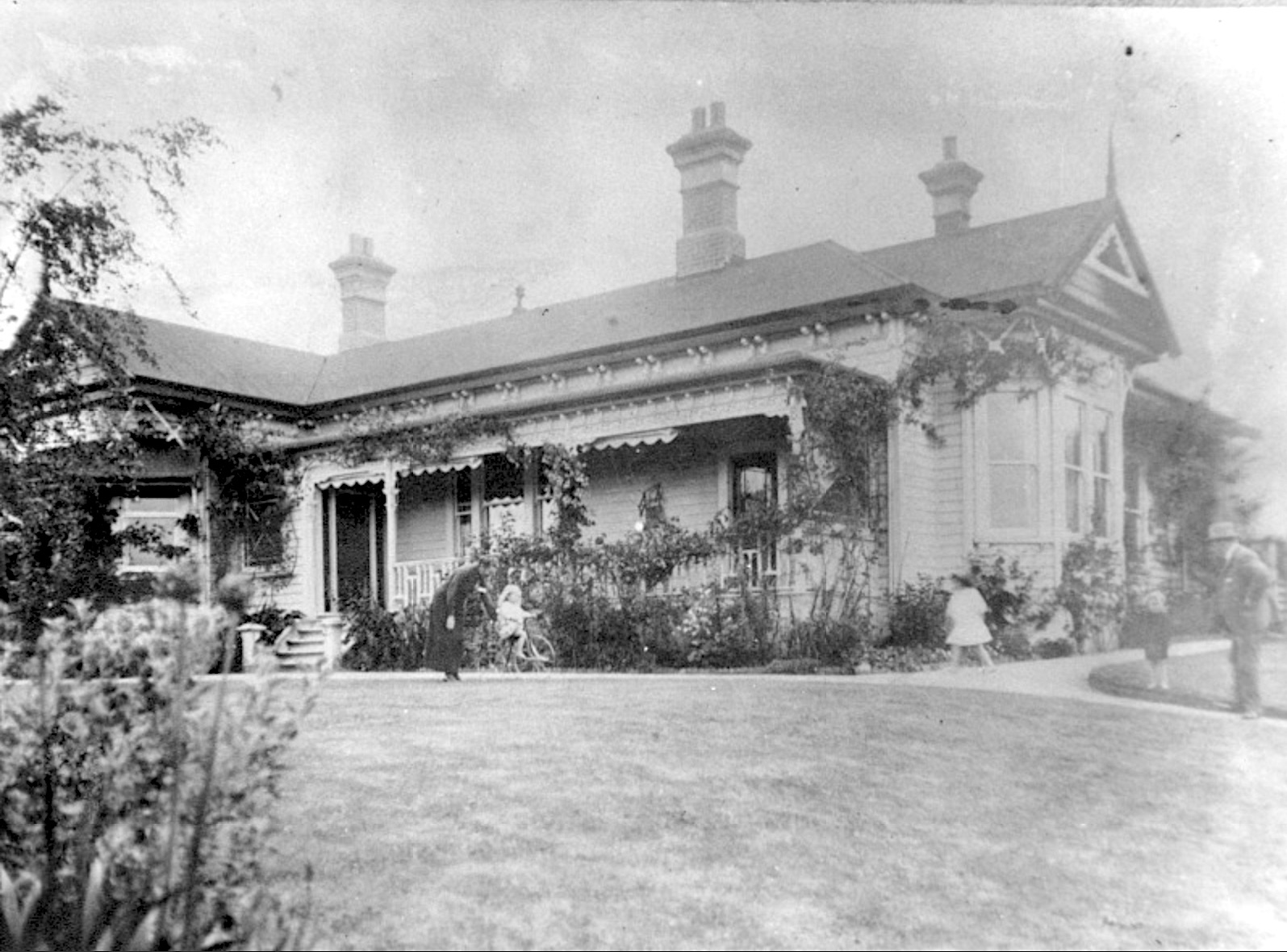
Ellen and Harry Valder had three daughters, Mollie (born 12 Dec 1901), Norah Winifred (born 1 Dec 1906) and Lilian (born 5 Jan 1911). Edingthorpe was built about 1904 and named after Ellen's home village in Kent. The house was removed when Miropiko Reserve was created about 1980.

Valder's youngest daughter, Lilian, died on 5 August 2001, aged 90. She went to Sonning School and St. Cuthbert's College, was a secretary and, from 1930 to 1963, developed a farm from bush below Mt Pirongia with her sister Mollie. Lilian retired to Waihi Beach in 1963, where she volunteered for St. John in their beach first aid caravan, meals on wheels and driving patients to Thames, Waikato and Tauranga Hospitals. In 1989 she set up the Valder Ohinemuri Charitable Trust for youth, people at risk and the elderly. In the 1993 New Year Honours, she was appointed a Member of the Order of the British Empire, for services to the community. Her sister, Norah Winifred Howell, had earlier set up a charitable trust in 1984.

Henry Valder planted many native trees in the grounds of his Hamilton riverside home, Edingthorpe. He was a keen follower of cricket and enjoyed social tennis. Although not a religious man he attended the Anglican church because of the commitment of his wife, Ellen. She died on 2 June 1931.

Valder married a widow, Marie (Daisy) Herbert (formerly Quelch) in Thames on 11 April 1934. He died suddenly at home on 12 February 1950, survived by his three daughters and second wife.
