= Joseph Bernard Dawson =

New Zealand gynaecologist (1883–1965)

Sir Joseph Bernard Dawson KBE (8 April 1883 – 17 August 1965) was a New Zealand gynaecologist. He was born in Erdington, Warwickshire, England, on 8 April 1883.

In the 1948 New Year Honours, Dawson was appointed a Knight Commander of the Order of the British Empire.
