= Wilfred Wallis =

New Zealand orthopedic doctor and medical administrator

Wilfred Wallis OBE
- Born: Wilfred Stanley Wallis; 15 May 1891; Opawa, Christchurch, New Zealand
- Died: 20 September 1957 (aged 66); Rotorua, New Zealand
- Education: University of Otago
- Occupation(s): Doctor; Military medical officer

Wilfred Stanley Wallis OBE (15 May 1891 – 20 September 1957) was a New Zealand doctor of orthopaedics and medical administrator, who served as a medical officer during the First World War.

Born in Christchurch, he studied medicine at the University of Otago. During the First World War, he served on the staff of No. 1 New Zealand Stationary Hospital and also received training in orthopaedics. After the war he worked at a hospital in Rotorua before going into private practice. He returned to military service in the Second World War as a superintendent of a convalescent hospital in Rotorua. He remained in charge of the hospital after the war and was made an officer of the Order of the British Empire in 1948. He died suddenly having shortly returned to private practice.

== Early life ==
Born in the Christchurch suburb of Opawa, in New Zealand, on 15 May 1891, Wilfred Stanley Wallis was the son of Eliza and John Wallis. His father, a carpenter, was an emigrant from London. Wallis was educated at Christchurch Boys’ High School and in 1910, began studying medicine at the University of Otago. He was one of a number of medical students from Otago who were involved in the smallpox epidemic in late 1913, helping with a vaccination drive amongst the Māori population in the North Island, who were the most vulnerable to the virus. His work was subsequently publicly recognised by the Minister of Health, Heaton Rhodes.

== First World War ==
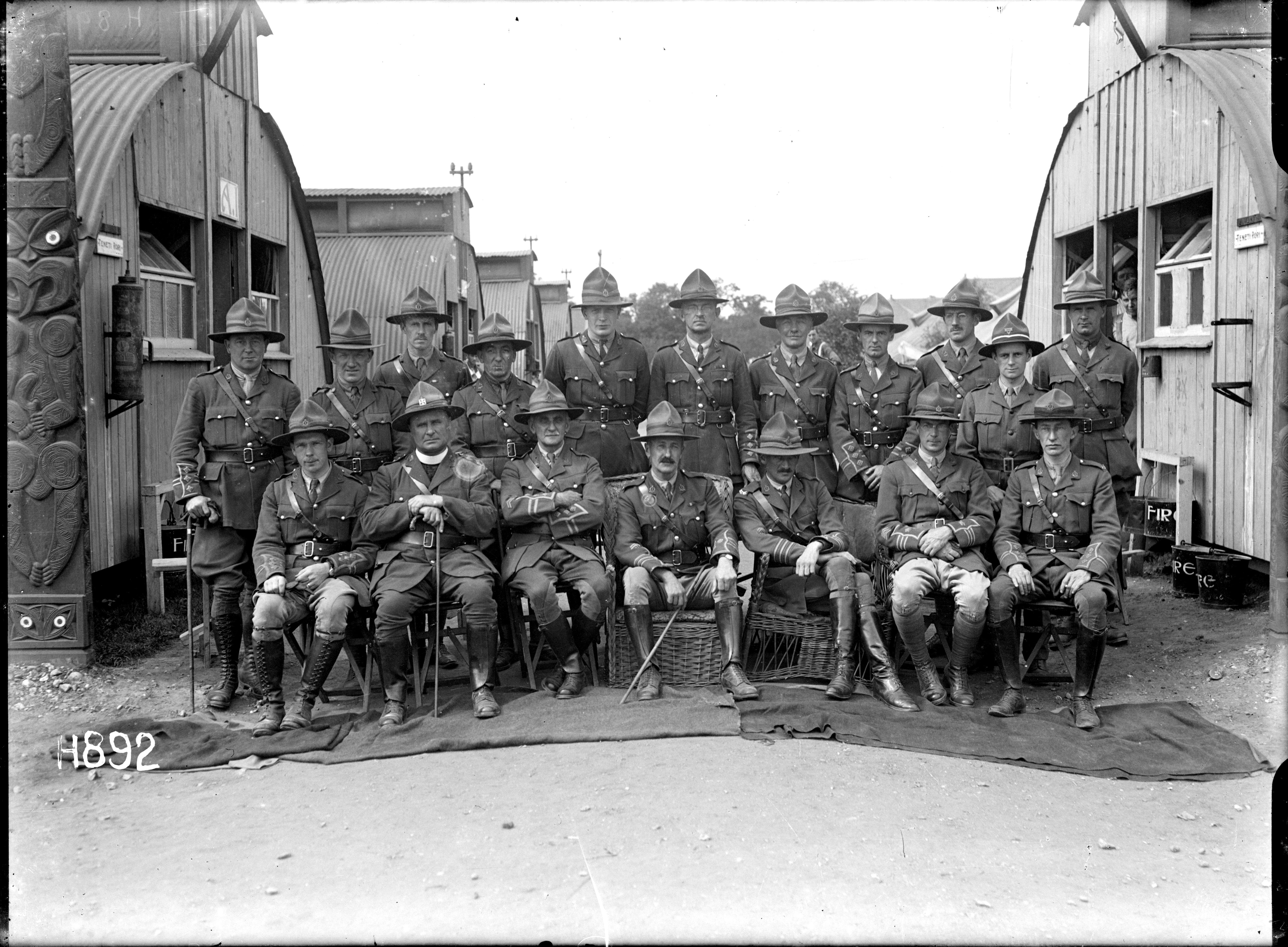
Medical officers of No. 1 New Zealand Stationary Hospital, when it was situated in Wisques in France

Wallis graduated from Otago in June 1915 with a Bachelor of Medicine and Bachelor of Surgery (MB, ChB) and soon after afterwards enlisted in the New Zealand Expeditionary Force (NZEF) for service with the New Zealand Medical Corps in the First World War. Before his departure to the Middle East, he married Elsie Ada Williams in Timaru. Once he arrived in Egypt, he served on the staff of No. 1 New Zealand Stationary Hospital. At the time, the NZEF was heavily engaged in the Gallipoli campaign and its casualties had been treated in British hospitals in the area. With the establishment of the hospital at Port Said, it began receiving New Zealand patients from other hospitals.

No. 1 New Zealand Stationary Hospital was subsequently transferred to Salonika, where it served until March 1916, returning to Egypt. From June 1916, it was based in France. The following year Wallis was sent to England, where he received training in orthopaedics, under the tutelage of Sir Robert Jones. By the end of the war, Wallis was a major.

== Later life ==
Returning to Christchurch following his discharge from the NZEF, in March 1919 Wallis applied for registration as a medical practitioner. The following year he took up an appointment as superintendent of King George V Military Hospital in Rotorua. This was a rehabilitation centre for returning wounded soldiers but when it transitioned to civilian use and control, under the auspices of the Department of Health, he advocated strongly for local Māori to utilise its services, rather than relying on tribal sources of medical treatment, such as herbs or tohunga. In 1926 he became a general practitioner in Rotorua, working in this capacity for a number of years. Along with noted orthopaedic surgeon, Alexander Gillies, he helped found the New Zealand Crippled Children Society in 1935, becoming its vice-president.

During the Second World War, Wallis returned to military service by becoming the superintendent of a convalescent hospital for servicemen in Rotorua, holding the rank of colonel. This hospital had been established in March 1942 as a centre for treatment of orthopaedic cases, and had a capacity of 150 beds. After the war, the facility became the Queen Elizabeth Hospital and Wallis was its first superintendent. In the 1948 New Year Honours, his work with returned servicemen was recognised with an appointment as an officer of the Order of the British Empire. Interested in art, he helped establish the Rotorua Society of Arts. Although he had limited training in painting, he was influenced by John Weeks and produced a number of abstract works.

Wallis resigned as superintendent in March 1957 for health reasons. He resumed private practice a few months later but died suddenly at Rotorua on 20 September 1957. He was survived by his wife and the couple's two children.
