= Leslie Neale =

New Zealand minister

Captain Leslie Bourneman Neale MBE ED (26 June 1886 – 26 August 1959) was a Methodist minister and chaplain to New Zealand troops, Christchurch City Council Councillor and church administrator.

== Ordination and early service ==
He was educated at Pukekawa College and the University of Canterbury. Neale offered for the ministry in 1908 and was ordained in 1915 at Christchurch. He married Mary Vickers on 4 December of the same year, after a protracted engagement of seven years; the church had required that they not marry until Neale had been ordained. The conference of the following year approved his chaplaincy with the armed forces. Neale arrived in France in 1917 with the 22nd Reinforcements, saw action at Ypres and Passchendaele (where he was seriously wounded), and worked with the Commonwealth War Graves Commission at Gallipoli.

== Middle years ==
On his return to New Zealand he worked in Dunedin and Christchurch ministering to the poor. He was Superintendent of the Dunedin Central Mission for 20 years, a founder of the Radio Church of the Helping Hand, and founded the Eventide Home in Dunedin.

With the onset of the Great Depression, he was instrumental in setting up the first work relief stations in the Christchurch suburb of Papanui. In 1929–1931 Neale was elected to the Christchurch City Council.

As the depression subsided Neale setup up an early radio show and later health camps funded by special stamps.

== World War II ==
When World War II broke out, Neale was elected president of the Methodist Church in 1940. At the time, the church forbade use of the pulpit to promote either recruitment or conscientious objection and as president Neale was critical of some pacifist ministers for breaking the policy.

== Late life ==
In the 1948 New Year Honours Neale was appointed a Member of the Order of the British Empire for his long sustained community services. Neale retired in Auckland in 1951, and died on 26 August 1959.

== Biography ==
- Haigh, J. Bryant (1983). Men of Faith and Courage: The official history of the Royal New Zealand Chaplains Department pp74,75. Auckland: The Word.
- Who’s Who in New Zealand, 5th edition, edited by G. H. Scholefield p171 (1951, Reed, Wellington)
- Military Personnel File (downloadable) for Neale, WWI No 35569
