= Fourth Labour Government of New Zealand =

Government of New Zealand, 1984 to 1990

Fourth Labour Government
- Ministries of New Zealand
- 1984–1990
- Date formed: 26 July 1984
- Date dissolved: 2 November 1990

People and organisations
- Monarch: Elizabeth II
- Prime Minister: David Lange (1984–1989); Geoffrey Palmer (1989–1990); Mike Moore (1990)
- Deputy Prime Minister: Geoffrey Palmer (1984–1989); Helen Clark (1989–1990)
- Member party: Labour Party
- Status in legislature: Majority
- Opposition party: National Party
- Opposition leader: Robert Muldoon (1984); Jim McLay (1984–1986); Jim Bolger (1986–1990)

History
- Elections: 1984 general election; 1987 general election
- Predecessor: Third National Government of New Zealand
- Successor: Fourth National Government of New Zealand

The Fourth Labour Government of New Zealand governed New Zealand from 26 July 1984 to 2 November 1990 (the period up to 8 August 1989 is also called the Lange Government). It was the first Labour government to win a second consecutive term since the First Labour Government of 1935 to 1949. The policy agenda of the Fourth Labour Government differed significantly from that of previous Labour governments: it enacted major social reforms (such as legalising homosexual relations) and economic reforms (including corporatisation of state services and reform of the tax system).

The economic reforms became known as "Rogernomics", after Finance Minister Roger Douglas. According to one political scientist:

Between 1984 and 1993, New Zealand underwent radical economic reform, moving from what had probably been the most protected, regulated and state-dominated system of any capitalist democracy to an extreme position at the open, competitive, free-market end of the spectrum.

The Labour government also enacted nuclear-free legislation, which led to the United States suspending its treaty obligations to New Zealand under the ANZUS alliance. David Lange led the government for most of its two three-year terms in office. Lange and Douglas had a falling-out that divided the party. The government suffered a defeat at the 1990 general election, but the incoming National government retained most of the reforms.

== Significant policies ==
=== Economic ===
- A range of economic reforms collectively known as Rogernomics. These included:
  - Floating the New Zealand dollar.
  - Removing all agricultural subsidies.
  - Introducing GST (Goods and Services Tax).
  - New banks were allowed.
  - Large reductions in income and company tax, along with the proposed implementation of a flat tax.
  - Removing controls on foreign exchange.
  - Abolishing or reducing import tariffs.
  - Corporatising many State owned enterprises such as the Post Office, Telecom and Air New Zealand to be more like private businesses. Some of these were later privatised.
  - Disestablishing the NZ Forest Service and sold the forests.
  - Abolishing price controls and interest rate control.
  - Privatised state assets, such as New Zealand Steel.
  - Enabling the Reserve Bank to autonomously pursue an inflation target.
  - Improving the reporting and accountability for government expenditure (Public Finance Act 1989).

=== Foreign policy ===
The government's most notable foreign policy initiative concerned nuclear weapons and the ANZUS alliance. Many New Zealanders (especially within the Labour Party) wanted to make New Zealand a nuclear-free zone. An opinion poll conducted by the Defence Committee showed that 92% of the population opposed the presence of nuclear weapons entering New Zealand. However this would ultimately require the banning of all American warships from entering New Zealand waters as it was US policy to 'neither confirm nor deny' whether individual ships were nuclear armed. The warships had been visiting New Zealand as part of the ANZUS alliance, and most people hoped that the alliance could be preserved even if the nuclear ban took effect. The issue came to a head shortly after the 1984 election, as a proposed visit by the USS Buchanan was on the cards. Lange announced that the Buchanan would not be welcome, and the US suspended its treaty obligations to New Zealand under the ANZUS alliance. The issue became a cause célèbre in New Zealand, perhaps primarily because small countries rarely stand up to larger and more powerful countries in such a way. In America, those on the right called for trade sanctions against New Zealand while those on the left idealised the country. New Zealand's diplomatic relations with America have never returned to their pre-1984 status, although the nuclear issue is becoming less important. The government also reinstated a diplomatic representative resident in India (Muldoon had closed the High Commission there) and appointed Edmund Hillary to the post.

=== Defence ===
- In 1989, New Zealand withdraws all forces of the 1st Battalion, Royal New Zealand Infantry Regiment from Dieppe Barracks, Singapore.

=== Constitutional ===
- Created the Royal Commission on the Electoral System (1985).
- Constitution Act 1986 – codified important constitutional conventions in one enactment.
- New Zealand Bill of Rights Act 1990 – enumerated civil and political rights.

The government's constitutional reforms were primarily the work of Geoffrey Palmer, a constitutional lawyer who for many years had been concerned about New Zealand's lack of a written constitution and the 'unbridled power' of the executive. These concerns came to the fore when the Government was elected to office, and led to the Official Committee on Constitutional Reform, which reported back to Parliament in February 1986 and led to the 1986 Constitution Act. Ironically, Palmer's government would provide a key example of the executive abusing its power, as one faction in cabinet exerted power disproportionate to its numbers (see Division over Rogernomics, below). Palmer's plan for a written constitution and entrenched Bill of Rights was derailed partly by public indifference but mostly by opposition from Māori who believed that the Treaty of Waitangi would be sidelined in the process.

=== Local government ===
Reformed local government in 1989, amalgamating 850 local bodies into 86 authorities.

=== Social policy ===
==== Justice ====
- Legalised sex between males over the age of 16 (Homosexual Law Reform).
- Passed the Children, Young Persons, and Their Families Act 1989, introducing Family Group Conferences.
- The death penalty was fully abolished.
- Rape within marriage was criminalised.
- Road safety standards were improved through tighter law enforcement of substance-affected drivers.

==== Social development and welfare ====
- Spending on education and health was significantly increased from 1985/86 to 1988/89, by 24% and 9.6% respectively.
- Disability benefits were increased, with the 1985 budget raising the Handicapped Child's Allowance by 31% and the disability allowance by 80%. A special earnings exemption of $20 per week was also introduced for severely disabled beneficiaries as an incentive to personal effort.
- A new family support benefit (introduced as the family care benefit in 1984) raised the incomes of some poor families.
- The Social Assistance programme was reformed (1986) with the introduction of a guaranteed minimum family benefit. This fixed an income floor above the statutory minimum wage for persons with dependant children in full-time employment. Known as the Guaranteed Minimum Family Income, it guaranteed working families roughly 80% of the average post-tax wage, although its impact on participation rates was limited by rising unemployment and high effective marginal tax rates.
- The abatement level for most benefits was raised to make it easier for social security beneficiaries to enter the workforce without fear of losing their benefits until they were more established.
- Social assistance programmes were expanded and consolidated.
- A Ministry of Women's Affairs (now the Ministry for Women) was established (1986) to promote equality for women; the first minister was Ann Hercus.
- The Parental Leave and Employment Protection Act 1987 extended coverage to women and their partners or spouses to take unpaid leave from their employment.
- Skills training programme were continuously developed, as characterised by the Access programme, which trained 60,000 people a year by 1990.
- The 1985 Tax Reform Package reduced the tax burden for low and middle-income households and left most New Zealanders better off.
- The 1985 Budget made the benefits system fairer by introducing more generous income exemption limits and benefit abatement. Although benefits became taxable, the budget also gave price compensation to beneficiaries for the introduction of GST and included them in Family Support payments. Altogether, these measures meant that beneficiaries were actually better off on the introduction of GST and this in turn reduced inequalities.
- Liberalised immigration to New Zealand in 1987, particularly for skilled migrants.
- The government set out to encourage the Broadcasting Corporation to provide appropriate facilities and to recruit and train sufficient staff already fluent in the use of Maori and Pacific Island languages. TVNZ's commitment to the development and strengthening of an independent and indigenous production presence on screen was demonstrated "in the appointment of a Commissioning Editor to pursue an increase in the acquisition of independent productions, and in the setting up of a Maori Programmes Department whose Head had a special involvement in establishing a training scheme for Maori broadcasters." Similar encouragement was also provided for Pacific Island broadcasting with Tagata Pasifika first screening in 1987 with Pacific Island staff involved in its production.
- Accommodation Benefit was increased (1985).
- Superannuation and other benefits were increased (1984).
- Universal payment of the Family Benefit was abolished to target families most in need.
- Family Benefit capitalisation limits for first-home seekers were increased (1985).
- Changes were made to National Superannuation (1988) by ensuring that "all new superannuitants would be paid the same rate, regardless of age of spouse".
- Increased assistance was provided to veteran pensioners and single superannuitants (1990).
- Annual indexation of war-related pensions, social security benefits, and National Superannuation was restored due to falling inflation (1988).
- A Special Accommodation Benefit for low-income earners struggling with rents was introduced (1985).
- Tax concessions were introduced for low-income families within the Guaranteed Family Income and Family Support schemes (1986).
- Income limits for Family Benefit capitalisation were increased for modest-income earners (1985).
- New policies were developed to address the needs of women and senior citizens, together with general diverse housing needs (1989).

==== Industrial relations ====
- The 1987 Labour Relations Act was passed with the intention of increasing unions' relative power while at the same time decentralising bargaining to the 'enterprise' (firm) level. Unions were bolstered by the passing of this legislation.
- The closed shop for private sector unions was reinstated.
- Social service spending for public sector unions was expanded.

==== Education ====
- In tertiary education, the Fourth Labour Government introduced charges equalling 10 percent of tuition costs, although students on low incomes were compensated with targeted allowances.
- Public funding of day care was increased substantially and maternity and paternity leave were extended (feminists inside and outside the New Zealand Labour Party helped bring about these developments).
- Improvements in education were made, as demonstrated by the expansion and strengthening of early childhood education, significant increases of teaching staff at kindergarten, enhancement of teacher education, attention to special education and support for Taha Maori, and funding for a measure which allowed for the universalisation of three year integrated childcare and kindergarten teacher training.
- The Education Amendment (No.2) Act 1987 amended the 1964 Education Act so that persons with special educational needs (whether by reason of disability or otherwise)had the same rights to enrol and receive education at institutions established under the Act as persons without such needs.
- Multi-cultural education was encouraged via increased levels of recruitment of teachers from minority cultures, and this policy resulted in a considerable increase in the number of applicants accepted for training as well as in more minority teachers for primary, secondary, and multicultural schools.
- Access to extramural study was significantly expanded.
- The fee for overseas students was reduced from $1,500 to $1,000 in 1984 and then abolished in 1987.
- Vocational opportunities for school leavers were significantly expanded, as characterised by the merging of various vocational programmes into a single Training Assistance Programme (1985).
- Early childhood teacher training was extended.
- The University Entrance (UE) examination was abolished, which had a far-reaching significance for the education of students in the senior forms of secondary schools. "Instead of being seen solely as preparation for university study, the courses leading to Sixth Form Certificate (SFC) provided a wider and more general education. This award more satisfactorily accommodated the diverse needs of students in Form 6, and thus recognised the changing, broader composition of the student population at that level".
- In 1985, the National Film Library initiated "a video cassette loan service alongside its traditional 16 mm film services.* This measure provided schools with "access to the wide range of programmes being produced in video and television format".
- Funding was allocated to early childhood education, which allowed for the universalisation of three-year integrated childcare and kindergarten teacher training.
- The Education Amendment (No.2) Act 1987 altered the 1964 Education Act so that persons with special educational needs (whether by reason of disability or otherwise) had the same rights to enrol and receive education at institutions established under the Act as persons without such needs.
- Four-minute reading and reading recovery, the teaching procedure which reduces the incidence of reading failure among 6-year-old children, was extended to a further 200 schools between 1985 and 1986.
- Five new Kura Kaupapa schools were commissioned as a means of raising Maori educational achievement (1990).
- Spending on full-time primary, secondary, polytechnic and area sector school teaching/tutoring/teachers college positions was increased (1987).
- Spending on preschool education was increased (1989).
- Extra funding was provided for the mainstreaming of special education students (1990).

==== Health ====
- The Nurses Amendment Act (1990) ensured that midwives regained autonomy as independent practitioners and provided them with the same levels of pay as doctors who practised obstetrics.
- The government subsidy of general practitioner care was increased in 1988 and again in 1990 for the elderly, children, and the chronically ill. From September 1990 onwards, practitioners were provided with the option of joining "a contract scheme which offered an inflation-adjusted subsidy for all consultations in return for limits on user charges and the provision of patient information for a national database". This scheme was abandoned by the Fourth National Government
- Spending on the General Medical Services and immunisation benefits was increased (1985).

==== Housing ====
- The Homestart programme (introduced in 1986) gave families and individuals on low to middle incomes a first home start with subsidised assistance to bridge the deposit gap.
- The housing package in the November 1984 budget introduced flexible loans levels which reflected individual family circumstances and regional differences in house prices thus granting access to mortgage finance on a fairer basis.
- The housing package in the November 1984 budget introduced flexible loans levels "reflecting individual family circumstances and regional differences in house prices thus granting access to mortgage finance on a fairer basis".
- Changes to loan and formal experience requirements for settlement and other land purchase made it easier for young and new farmers to acquire land.
- A pilot fund was put aside for financing housing projects aimed to help low-income women and families.
- Encouragement was given to local authorities to purchase existing homes for modernisation and re-sale. Purchase and rehabilitation loans authorised for local authorities increased by over 3465% between 1985 and 1987.
- The government proposed to lodge bond money with an independent authority which would invest it in authorised institutions rather than it being held by landlords, and claimed that: "Interest on this money will be used to cover the costs of the tenancy tribunal." The subsequent Residential Tenancies Act 1986 "legislated for all interest paid out of the bond fund to be used in payment of all salaries, wages, fees, allowances, expenses, costs, and disbursements payable to the Tenancy Tribunal".
- The Residential Tenancies Act (1986) provided new guarantees for tenants.
- The income tax abatement scheme for interest payments on first homes was abolished (1984).
- Income-related mortgage repayments were introduced (1984).
- Expenditure was increased for Maori Affairs department lending, Housing Corporation loans, refinancing of home loans (in extreme difficulty), and the construction of state rental units (1984).
- A new housing package was introduced, designed to target housing assistance to those in greatest need (1984).
- More flexible Housing Corporation lending was introduced, with interest rates adjusted to take into account a person's ability to pay (1985).
- Increased expenditure was allocated to increasing the construction or acquisition of the Housing Corporation's rental units (1985).
- Family Benefit capitalisation for modest-income first-home seekers was increased (1985).
- A Special Accommodation Benefit for wage and salary earners having problems with paying their rent was introduced (1985).
- The Rent Limitation Regulations were abolished to encourage new investment in the private rental sector (1985).
- Income-related rates and rents were introduced (1985).
- The Old People's Home Regulations (1987) required that bathrooms, kitchens, sanitary fittings and laundries in Old People's Homes have an approved sink with an adequate supply of hot and cold water.
- Expenditure was allocated for New Zealanders unable to find accommodation in the private sector, together with expenditure for state housing rental stock (1989).
- The special lending programme was expanded to help community and welfare organisations to provide support housing (1989).

==== Institutional reform ====
- The Department of Conservation was established (1987) to "…manage endangered, vulnerable, rare, and protected plants, animals, and ecosystems to ensure their long term viability".
- A Ministry of Consumer Affairs was established (1986) "to advise the Government on matters affecting consumers; to promote and participate in the review of consumer related legislation, policies and programmes; to promote awareness among consumers and the business sector of their rights and obligations in the market place; and to support and co-ordinate non-Government involvement in consumer issues".
- Government departments were required to meet the "demand for the placement of people with disabilities in the Public Service." Sixty places were "allocated for the Employment of Disabled Persons scheme" and by the end of the government's first term, 57 had been filled.
- The government introduced ‘A New Deal in Training and Employment Opportunities’ (1985) which represented a shift "to an active longer term labour market approach, centred on training and skill development and integration into the workforce".
- Government departments were required to meet the "demand for the placement of people with disabilities in the Public Service." Sixty places were "allocated for the Employment of Disabled Persons scheme" and by the end of the Fifth labour Government's first term, fifty-seven had been filled.
- In 1988/89, OSH (Occupational Safety and Health) sought to emphasise health in the workplace by "enforcing compliance with the standards established by regulation or in Codes of Practice."
- The 1988 State Sector Act and the 1989 Public Finance Act established private sector-style wage and work disciplines in the traditional welfare state and in those ‘non-commercial’ agencies still overseen by the State Services Commission, leading to "more customer-friendly service delivery in many instances".

=== Treaty of Waitangi and Maori policy ===
- Enabling the Waitangi Tribunal to investigate Treaty claims dating back to 1840 (Treaty of Waitangi Amendment Act 1985).
- Making Te Reo Māori (the Māori language) an official language of New Zealand, with the Māori Language Act. The act also established the Maori Language Commission, which amongst its objectives include the maintenance and promotion of the Māori language.
- Responded to the 1987 New Zealand Maori Council v Attorney-General ruling of the Court of Appeal by setting out its own principles of the Treaty of Waitangi in 1989.
- The Papakainga housing scheme was introduced, which enabled people to borrow money to construct or purchase housing on Maori land in multiple ownership.
- The Maori attestation scheme, He Tohu Matauranga, was extended to the primary service (1988). The attestation process was administered by the trustees of a marae. It confirmed the candidate's fluency in the Māori language and understanding of Maori culture. Applicants for primary teacher training could use attestation as an additional criterion for entry to a three-year training course. As a result, "Maori enrolments at colleges of education increased by 175 (41%) from 1988 to 1989".
- The Runanga Iwi Act of 1990 empowered tribal authorities to deliver government programmes. It was repealed by the incoming National government.
- The Māori Loan Affair (about a proposed unauthorised overseas loan) was exposed by Winston Peters on 16 December 1986, and continued into January and February 1987.

=== Environmental policy ===
The Fourth Labour Government made significant reforms to resource management, conservation, planning and mining legislation and local government as well as the state sector. Significant new legislation included:

- The Environment Act 1986, which created the Ministry for the Environment, and,
- The Conservation Act 1987, which created the Department of Conservation.

Geoffrey Palmer initiated the Resource Management Law Reform process which later resulted in the enactment of the Resource Management Act 1991 and the Crown Minerals Act 1991, after Labour lost office in the 1990 election.

In 1988, the Fourth Labour Government initiated the first work programme for developing policy for climate change. This was in response to the establishment of the Intergovernmental Panel on Climate Change. The policy programme was coordinated between agencies by the Ministry of the Environment.

== Formation ==
The fourth Labour government was brought into office by a landslide victory in the 1984 election. This was a snap election called by Prime Minister Robert Muldoon after he lost confidence in his ability to command a majority of Parliament. The very short lead-up time to the election meant that Labour had no time to put together a formal manifesto, and this gave it licence to enact many policies which it had not told voters about before the election. Muldoon was extremely unpopular by this time, and most voters had become disillusioned with his economic policies, so it is entirely likely that Labour would have won this election even if they had announced their programme in advance. There was also a major run on the New Zealand Dollar caused by the constitutional crisis following the election, when outgoing Prime Minister Robert Muldoon refused to devalue the New Zealand dollar.

== The 1987 election ==
Although the government gained one seat, two extra seats had been created since the previous election and its majority remained unchanged at 17. Its share of the vote rose from 43% in 1984 to 48%, although voter turnout was down slightly. It had lost votes from traditional strongholds but gained them in formerly National-leaning seats. According to Lange, this alerted him to the fact that the Labour Party was drifting away from its traditional support base. He was particularly alarmed that Labour had nearly won the wealthy seat of Remuera, traditionally a National stronghold. Public support of the government's stand on the ANZUS issue probably also won it votes.

Despite internal divisions, the government managed to maintain a united front before and during the 1987 election. On election night, Lange raised Douglas' hand in a boxing-style victory pose, to convey unity.

However divisions had already emerged in January and February 1987 over the Māori loan affair, with only two other ministers supporting the proposal of Lange and Palmer that Koro Wētere should resign as Minister of Maori Affairs and from his seat in Parliament, with a consequent election-year by-election.

== Division over Rogernomics ==
The Labour Party was founded on socialist principles and traditionally favoured state regulation of the economy and strong support for disadvantaged members of society. The First Labour Government made major Keynesian reforms along these lines, and subsequent governments continued this system. By the 1970s, the system of regulation, protectionism and high taxes was no longer functioning properly, and required ever more regulation to stabilise it. Meanwhile, the Labour Party, once dominated by working-class and trade unionists, had attracted many middle-class people with its liberal social and independent foreign policies. These new members were interested in international issues such as the apartheid system in South Africa and nuclear weapons, and domestic 'identity politics' issues such as the Treaty of Waitangi and feminism. This group held a very wide range of economic views, but the majority had little interest in or knowledge of economics.

When the Fourth Labour government took office, most members accepted the need for some economic reform. Finance Minister Roger Douglas and his supporters felt that a complete overhaul of the New Zealand economic system was required. Initially most of the government supported this, although a number of traditionalists were already suspicious of Douglas. Gradually more and more MPs, including Prime Minister David Lange became alarmed at the extent and speed of the reforms. Those in the government who wanted to slow or stop the reforms found it difficult to do so. This is partially because few of them knew much about economics, and were thus unable to convincingly rebut the "Douglas" proposals. In 1984, David Caygill and Richard Prebble had been made associate ministers to Douglas, with Douglas, Caygill and Prebble, known as the "Troika" or the "Treasury Troika", becoming the most powerful group in Cabinet.

The "Douglas" faction, which supported the reforms, dominated Cabinet. The doctrine of Cabinet collective responsibility under the "Westminster system" requires all Cabinet members to support Cabinet policy, even if they do not agree with it. Since the Cabinet had a slight majority in the Labour caucus, the Douglas faction was able to dominate caucus even though they were a minority. It was later alleged that Douglas and his supporters had used underhand tactics such as introducing important motions at the last minute, preventing serious debate. David Lange also complained in his autobiography about the "Backbone club", a ginger group chaired by Ron Bailey which supported Douglas and Rogernomics.

The divisions within the government came to a head in 1988. Lange felt that New Zealand had experienced enough change in a short period, and that the country needed time to recover from the reforms and from the effects of the 1987 stock market crash and the resulting economic recession. Douglas wanted to press on with reforms, and put forward a proposal for a flat tax. Lange initially supported this, but then realised it would inevitably lead to cuts in social services. Without informing his colleagues, he held a press conference announcing that the flat tax scheme would not go ahead. Douglas released a letter and press statement stating a lack of confidence in Lange, and Lange treated it as a resignation. He was replaced as Minister of Finance by David Caygill, who said in an Eyewitness special that he stood for a continuation of Rogernomics.

The next year saw even greater fracturing. After being defeated in his bid for the party presidency, Jim Anderton quit the party to form NewLabour; which stood for Labour's traditional socialist values. Douglas was re-elected to Cabinet, leading to Lange's resignation. He was replaced with Geoffrey Palmer, a Lange supporter and constitutional lawyer. However he lacked the charisma to attract voters, and shortly before the 1990 election he was replaced by Mike Moore.

The Labour Party took several years to recover from the damage of these years and to regain the trust of their former supporters. In the 1990 election, Labour lost many votes to NewLabour, the Greens, and in 1993 to the Alliance Party, which had been formed by NewLabour, the Greens and several other small left-wing political parties.

Douglas did not stand at the 1990 election, and several of his supporters were defeated. He went on to form the ACT Party, which aimed to continue his reforms. He was later joined by Richard Prebble, who became leader.

== Defeat and legacy ==
By the time of the 1990 general election the government was in chaos. Lange had resigned and Mike Moore had taken over from Lange's successor Geoffrey Palmer just eight weeks before the election. Jim Anderton had quit the party to form NewLabour, which represented the Labour Party's traditional values.

The election was a disaster for Labour. The party lost nearly half its seats, including one to Anderton. Anderton's NewLabour Party and the Greens took many votes from Labour, although the first-past-the-post electoral system meant that their share of the vote was not reflected in the division of seats. Michael Bassett commented that the government "whimpered away unlamented, a victim of low commodity prices that delayed economic recovery, but more particularly of catastrophically poor leadership in its second term".

The National Party won the election, forming the Fourth National Government. Labour would not regain power until 1999. Jim Bolger said after inheriting two financial crisis from Labour (a budget deficit not a surplus, and the need to bail out the Bank of New Zealand) that Labour had lied during the campaign: he was still angry because the lie was so big. Despite campaigning on the promise of delivering a "Decent Society" following Rogernomics, Bolger's Fourth National Government essentially advanced the free-market reforms of the Fourth Labour Government—this continuation of Rogernomics was called Ruthanasia. The economic structure introduced by Roger Douglas has remained essentially unchanged since the 1980s.

The disillusionment of the electorate was also reflected in referendums in 1992 and 1993 which resulted in electoral reform in the form of a change from first-past-the-post to mixed-member proportional (MMP), a form of proportional representation.

The Fourth Labour Government's nuclear-free zone policy is still occasionally debated as of 2018 and has been a subject of controversy in New Zealand. Don Brash (National Party leader from 2003 to 2006) talked about repealing the anti-nuclear Act to six visiting United States senators in May 2004, even going so far as to say the ban on nuclear-ship visits would be "gone, by lunchtime even". He and his party received much criticism for promising foreign politicians to ban something so ingrained in New Zealand political culture.

== Election results ==
Election	Parliament	Seats	Total votes	Percentage	Gain (loss)	Seats won	Change	Majority
1984	41st	95	829,154	42.98%	+3.97%	56	+13	17
1987	42nd	97	878,448	47.96%	+4.98%	57	+1	17
1990	43rd	97	640,915	35.14%	-12.82%	29	-28	

== Prime ministers ==
David Lange was Prime Minister for most of this Government's term. In 1989 he resigned and Geoffrey Palmer replaced him. A little over a year later, Mike Moore replaced Palmer, only eight weeks before the 1990 election:

Prime Ministers of the Fourth Labour Government

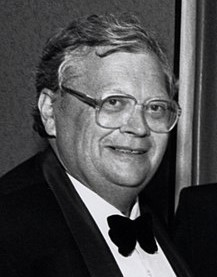
David Lange
served 1984–89

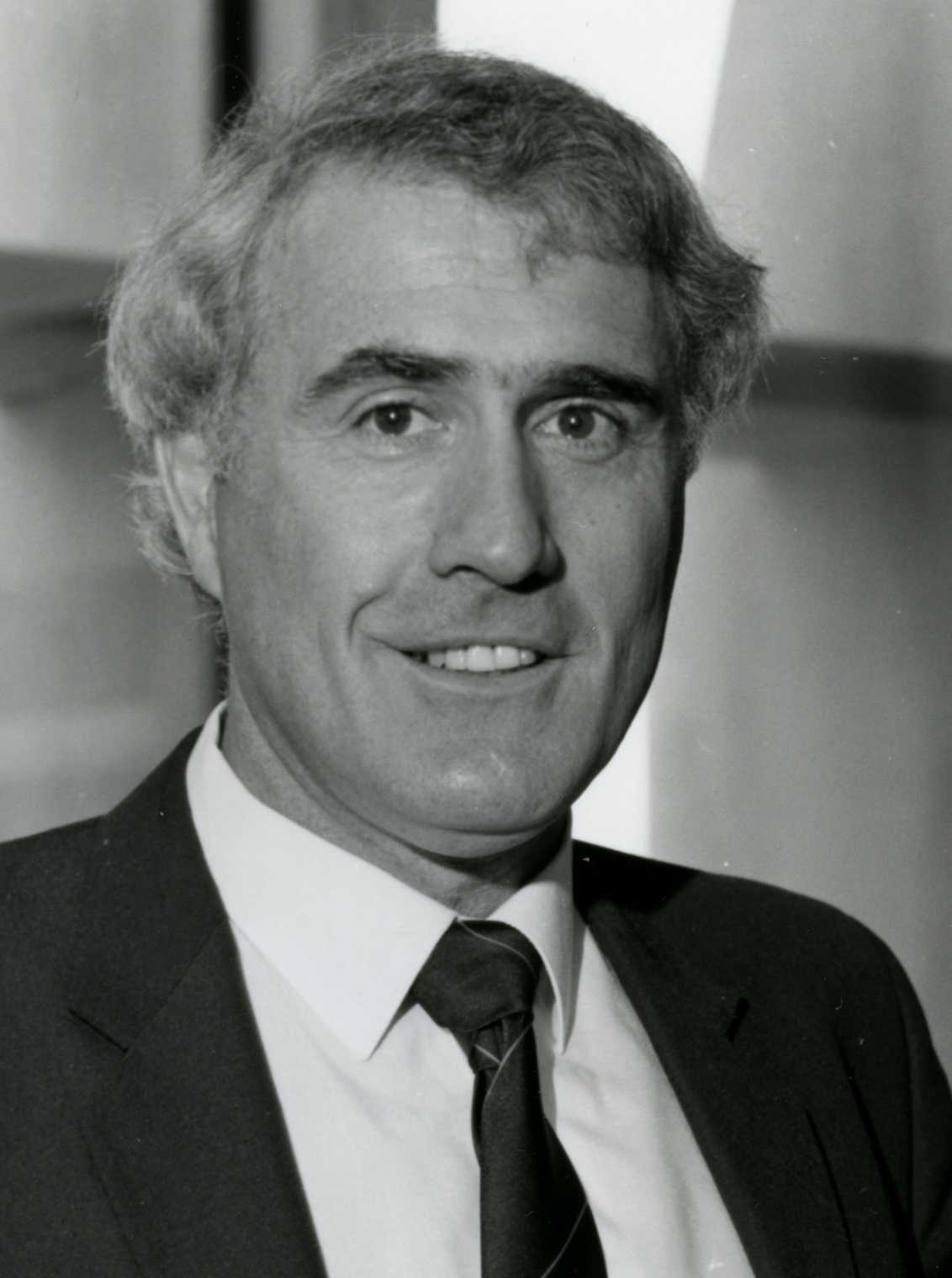
Sir Geoffrey Palmer
served 1989–90

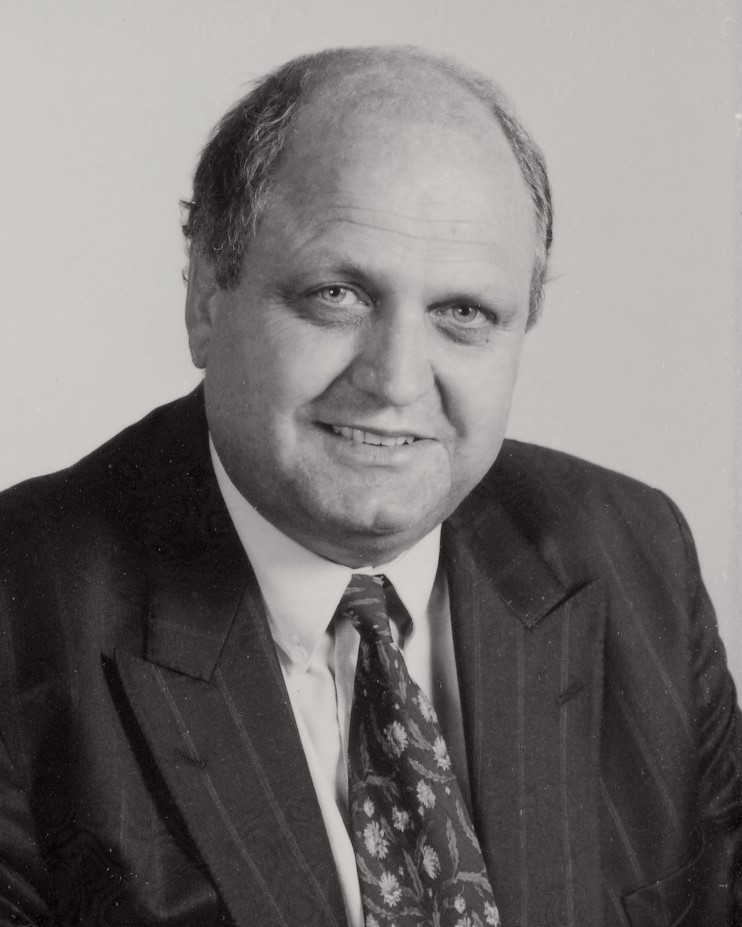
Mike Moore
served 1990

== Cabinet ministers ==
Portfolio	Minister	Start	End
Prime Minister	David Lange	26 July 1984	8 August 1989
Prime Minister	Geoffrey Palmer	8 August 1989	4 September 1990
Prime Minister	Mike Moore	4 September 1990	2 November 1990
Deputy Prime Minister	Geoffrey Palmer	26 July 1984	8 August 1989
Deputy Prime Minister	Helen Clark	8 August 1989	2 November 1990
Minister of Agriculture	Colin Moyle	26 July 1984	9 February 1990
Minister of Agriculture	Jim Sutton	9 February 1990	2 November 1990
Attorney-General	Geoffrey Palmer	26 July 1984	8 August 1989
Attorney-General	David Lange	8 August 1989	2 November 1990
Minister for Arts, Culture and Heritage	Peter Tapsell	26 July 1984	24 August 1987
Minister for Arts, Culture and Heritage	Michael Bassett	24 August 1987	9 February 1990
Minister for Arts, Culture and Heritage	Margaret Austin	9 February 1990	2 November 1990
Minister of Broadcasting	Jonathan Hunt	26 July 1984	24 August 1987
Minister of Broadcasting	Richard Prebble	24 August 1987	5 November 1988
Minister of Broadcasting	Jonathan Hunt	5 November 1988	2 November 1990
Minister of Civil Defence	Peter Tapsell	26 July 1984	24 August 1987
Minister of Civil Defence	Michael Bassett	24 August 1987	9 February 1990
Minister of Civil Defence	Margaret Austin	9 February 1990	2 November 1990
Minister of Commerce	David Butcher	24 August 1987	2 November 1990
Minister of Conservation	Russell Marshall	26 July 1984	24 August 1987
Minister of Conservation	Helen Clark	24 August 1987	30 January 1989
Minister of Conservation	Philip Woollaston	30 January 1989	2 November 1990
Minister of Customs	Margaret Shields	26 July 1984	24 August 1987
Minister of Customs	Trevor de Cleene	24 August 1987	14 December 1988
Minister of Customs	Margaret Shields	14 December 1988	8 August 1989
Minister of Customs	Peter Neilson	8 August 1989	2 November 1990
Minister of Defence	Frank O'Flynn	26 July 1984	24 July 1987
Minister of Defence	Bob Tizard	24 July 1987	9 February 1990
Minister of Defence	Peter Tapsell	9 February 1990	2 November 1990
Minister of Education	Russell Marshall	26 July 1984	24 August 1987
Minister of Education	David Lange	24 August 1987	8 August 1989
Minister of Education	Geoffrey Palmer	8 August 1989	14 August 1989
Minister of Education	Phil Goff	14 August 1989	2 November 1990
Minister of Employment	Kerry Burke	26 July 1984	6 April 1987
Minister of Employment	Phil Goff	6 April 1987	14 August 1989
Minister of Employment	Annette King	14 August 1989	2 November 1990
Minister of Energy	Bob Tizard	26 July 1984	16 September 1987
Minister of Energy	David Butcher	16 September 1987	2 November 1990
Minister for the Environment	Russell Marshall	26 July 1984	17 February 1986
Minister for the Environment	Phil Goff	17 February 1986	24 August 1987
Minister for the Environment	Geoffrey Palmer	24 August 1987	2 November 1990
Minister of Finance	Roger Douglas	26 July 1984	14 December 1988
Minister of Finance	David Caygill	14 December 1988	2 November 1990
Minister of Fisheries	Colin Moyle	26 July 1984	9 February 1990
Minister of Fisheries	Ken Shirley	9 February 1990	2 November 1990
Minister of Foreign Affairs	David Lange	26 July 1984	24 August 1987
Minister of Foreign Affairs	Russell Marshall	24 August 1987	9 February 1990
Minister of Foreign Affairs	Mike Moore	9 February 1990	2 November 1990
Minister of Forestry	Koro Wētere	26 July 1984	24 July 1987
Minister of Forestry	Peter Tapsell	24 July 1987	9 February 1990
Minister of Forestry	Jim Sutton	9 February 1990	2 November 1990
Minister of Health	Michael Bassett	26 July 1984	24 August 1987
Minister of Health	David Caygill	24 August 1987	30 January 1989
Minister of Health	Helen Clark	30 January 1989	2 November 1990
Minister of Housing	Phil Goff	26 July 1984	24 August 1987
Minister of Housing	Helen Clark	24 August 1987	14 August 1989
Minister of Housing	Jonathan Hunt	14 August 1989	2 November 1990
Minister of Immigration	Kerry Burke	26 July 1984	24 August 1987
Minister of Immigration	Stan Rodger	24 August 1987	14 August 1989
Minister of Immigration	Roger Douglas	14 August 1989	9 February 1990
Minister of Immigration	Annette King	9 February 1990	2 November 1990
Minister of Internal Affairs	Peter Tapsell	26 July 1984	24 August 1987
Minister of Internal Affairs	Michael Bassett	24 August 1987	9 February 1990
Minister of Internal Affairs	Margaret Austin	9 February 1990	2 November 1990
Minister of Justice	Geoffrey Palmer	26 July 1984	8 August 1989
Minister of Justice	Bill Jeffries	8 August 1989	2 November 1990
Minister of Labour	Stan Rodger	26 July 1984	8 August 1989
Minister of Labour	Helen Clark	8 August 1989	2 November 1990
Leader of the House	Geoffrey Palmer	26 July 1984	24 August 1987
Leader of the House	Jonathan Hunt	24 August 1987	2 November 1990
Minister of Local Government	Michael Bassett	26 July 1984	9 February 1990
Minister of Local Government	Philip Woollaston	9 February 1990	2 November 1990
Minister of Maori Affairs	Koro Wētere	26 July 1984	2 November 1990
Minister of Police	Ann Hercus	26 July 1984	16 September 1987
Minister of Police	Peter Tapsell	16 September 1987	8 August 1989
Minister of Police	Roger Douglas	8 August 1989	10 July 1990
Minister of Police	Richard Prebble	10 July 1990	2 November 1990
Postmaster-General	Jonathan Hunt	26 July 1984	24 August 1987
Postmaster-General	Richard Prebble	24 August 1987	5 November 1988
Postmaster-General	David Butcher	5 November 1988	14 August 1989
Minister of Railways	Richard Prebble	26 July 1984	4 November 1988
Minister of Railways	Stan Rodger	4 November 1988	9 February 1990
Minister of Railways	Richard Prebble	9 February 1990	2 November 1990
Minister of Revenue	Roger Douglas	26 July 1984	24 August 1987
Minister of Revenue	Trevor de Cleene	24 August 1987	15 December 1988
Minister of Revenue	David Caygill	15 December 1988	9 February 1990
Minister of Revenue	Peter Neilson	9 February 1990	2 November 1990
Minister for Social Welfare	Ann Hercus	26 July 1984	24 August 1987
Minister for Social Welfare	Michael Cullen	24 August 1987	2 November 1990
Minister for Sport and Recreation	Mike Moore	26 July 1984	24 July 1987
Minister for Sport and Recreation	Peter Tapsell	24 July 1987	10 July 1990
Minister for Sport and Recreation	Noel Scott	10 July 1990	2 November 1990
Minister for State Owned Enterprises	Richard Prebble	26 July 1984	4 November 1988
Minister for State Owned Enterprises	David Lange	4 November 1988	8 November 1988
Minister for State Owned Enterprises	Stan Rodger	8 November 1988	9 February 1990
Minister for State Owned Enterprises	Richard Prebble	9 February 1990	2 November 1990
Minister for State Services	Stan Rodger	26 July 1984	9 February 1990
Minister for State Services	Clive Matthewson	9 February 1990	2 November 1990
Minister of Statistics	Bob Tizard	26 July 1984	24 August 1987
Minister of Statistics	Margaret Shields	24 August 1987	2 November 1990
Minister of Tourism	Mike Moore	26 July 1984	24 August 1987
Minister of Tourism	Phil Goff	24 August 1987	10 January 1988
Minister of Tourism	Jonathan Hunt	10 January 1988	24 August 1989
Minister of Tourism	Fran Wilde	24 August 1989	2 November 1990
Minister of Trade	Mike Moore	26 July 1984	2 November 1990
Minister of Trade and Industry	David Caygill	26 July 1984	10 October 1988
Minister of Trade and Industry	David Butcher	10 October 1988	11 July 1989
Minister of Transport	Richard Prebble	26 July 1984	24 August 1987
Minister of Transport	Bill Jeffries	24 August 1987	2 November 1990
Minister of Works	Fraser Colman	26 July 1984	15 August 1987
Minister of Works	Richard Prebble	15 August 1987	8 November 1988
Minister of Works	Bill Jeffries	8 November 1988	9 February 1990
Minister of Works	Peter Neilson	9 February 1990	2 November 1990
Minister for Women	Ann Hercus	26 July 1984	24 August 1987
Minister for Women	Margaret Shields	24 August 1987	2 November 1990

== See also ==
- List of New Zealand governments
- New Zealand Labour Party
- Rogernomics
- Fish and Chip Brigade
