= Third National Government of New Zealand =

New Zealand government led by Robert Muldoon from 1975 to 1984

Third National Government
- Ministries of New Zealand
- 1975–1984
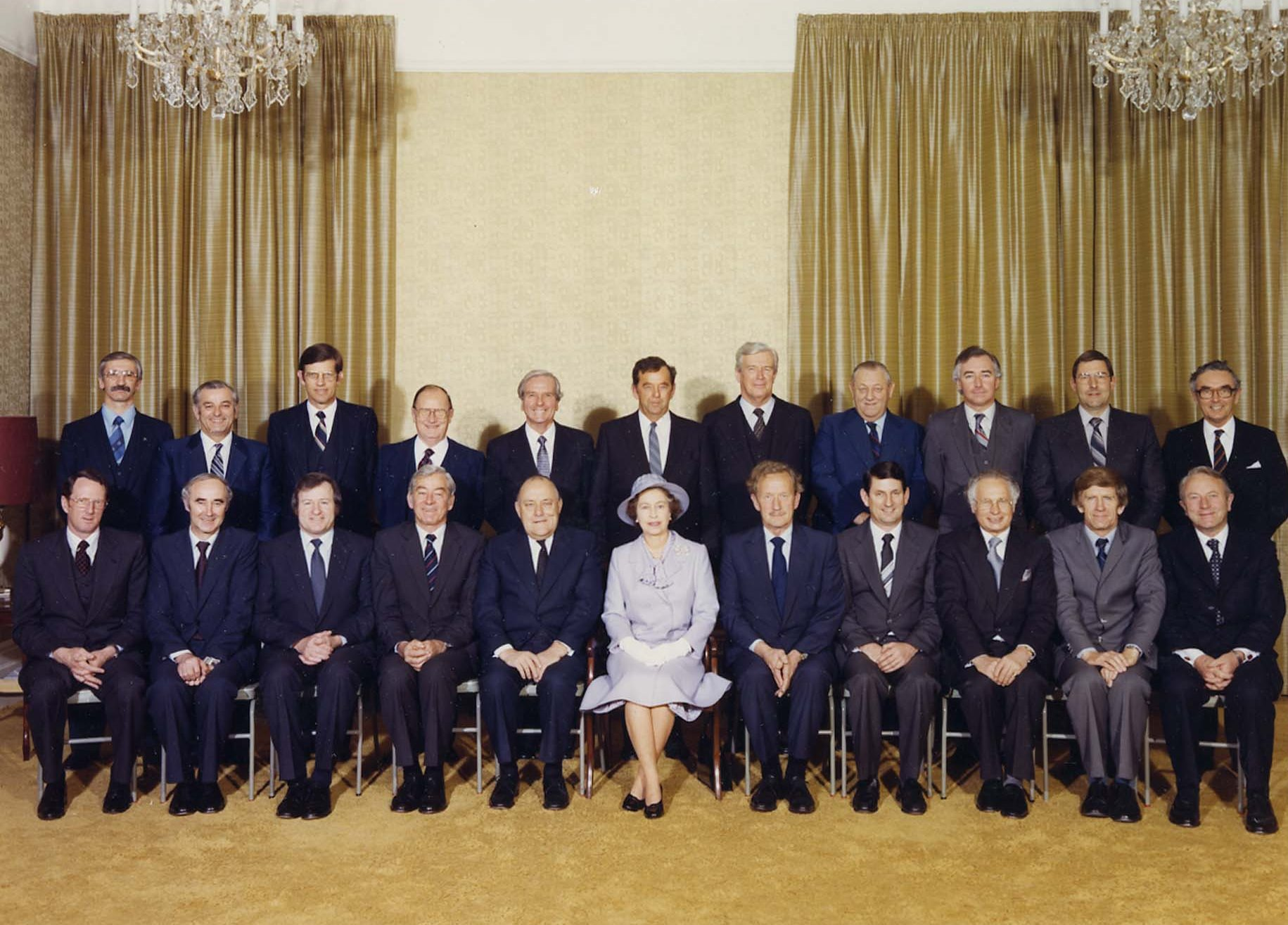
- Queen Elizabeth II and the 1981 New Zealand Cabinet
- Date formed: 12 December 1975
- Date dissolved: 26 July 1984

People and organisations
- Monarch: Elizabeth II
- Prime Minister: Robert Muldoon (1975–1984)
- Deputy Prime Minister: Brian Talboys (1975–1981); Duncan MacIntyre (1981–1984); Jim McLay (1984)
- Member party: National Party
- Status in legislature: Majority
- Opposition party: Labour Party
- Opposition leader: Bill Rowling (1975–1983); David Lange (1983–1984)

History
- Elections: 1975 general election; 1978 general election; 1981 general election
- Predecessor: Third Labour Government of New Zealand
- Successor: Fourth Labour Government of New Zealand

The Third National Government of New Zealand (also known as the Muldoon Government) was the government of New Zealand from 1975 to 1984. It was an economically conservative government that aimed to preserve the Keynesian economic system established by the First Labour government and was also socially conservative. Throughout its three terms it was led by Robert Muldoon, characterised by his populist and antagonistic personality, and who was sometimes described as the National Party's best asset and worst liability.

== Significant policies ==
By 1975, New Zealand had a generous welfare system, which included unemployment and sickness benefits, a benefit for single parents (the DPB) and a means-tested pension from the normal retirement age of 60 plus a universal pension from 65 years.

The third National government abolished Labour's contributory superannuation scheme and introduced National Superannuation, a non–means-tested pension available to all New Zealand citizens over the age of 60, linked to the average wage (initially 70% with the intention of increasing it to 80%). This was enormously expensive, costing NZ$2.5 billion per annum by 1984, and $24.7 billion by 2025, but nevertheless far more popular than Labour's alternative of a Singaporean Central Provident Fund–style set of individualised compulsory savings. Brian Gaynor estimated that the abolished scheme would be worth at least $240 billion by 2007, Sam Stubbs estimated $500 billion by 2021, and Eric Frykberg estimated it could be $1 trillion in 2025. Gaynor called the abolition New Zealand's "worst economic decision" over the 40 years to 2007, and Stubbs said "few economists would disagree that [... it] was probably the worst financial decision ever made".

=== Economic policy ===
The government continued the generally interventionist economic policies of previous governments in New Zealand. Although there was some pressure on Prime Minister and Finance Minister Robert Muldoon to take steps towards liberalising the economy, he was reluctant to do so as he felt that such moves would hurt ordinary New Zealanders. Such steps towards liberalisation made during this government's term were generally the initiatives of other politicians.

In 1980, the government launched the Think Big programme of large-scale industrial projects, mainly based around energy projects, to reduce New Zealand's dependence on foreign energy. This was a response to the oil shocks (1973 and 1979) of the 1970s, which dramatically raised the price of oil. Cabinet Minister Derek Quigley publicly criticised the Think Big policy and was demoted from Cabinet.

The control of inflation was an important goal for Muldoon, who always aimed to uphold the living standards of working and middle class New Zealanders. There was a high level of inflation worldwide in the 1970s and 1980s, leading Muldoon to intervene more and more dramatically in the economy. This interventionist policy culminated in the wage and price freeze of the early 1980s, and Muldoon's refusal to devalue the New Zealand dollar in 1984, which led to the New Zealand constitutional crisis.

The government pursued a limited number of liberalisation policies. In 1982 the land transport sector was deregulated, which allowed the restructuring of the New Zealand Railways Corporation later in the decade. The Closer Economic Relations free trade agreement with Australia was signed in 1983.

=== Social policies ===
1976 saw the phasing out of commodity subsidies and entitlement to the Additional Benefit. In 1976, the administration of many benefits, such as unemployment, sickness and the Domestic Purposes Benefit, was tightened up. Income exemptions, which the Third Labour Government had abolished and replaced with tax rebates, were reintroduced.

In 1977, the family assistance tax rebate was significantly extended. As note by Brian Easton, the tax relief for a young family "could be up to $13 a week more than for a married man without children, on the same income." In addition, full relief was available to families whose head "was on up to ten per cent above average earnings." The top income limit of the now $9 full rebate was increased to $150 a week, and a further $4 a week tax rebate for all single-income families with a child under the age of ten was introduced (it was reduced if the spouse's income exceeded $20 a week). Also, as noted by Brian Easton, there was now a tiering of family assistance, with families with children under the age of five "receiving up to $13 a week, and those with a youngest child between five and ten receiving up to $4 a week."

The Disabled Person's Community Welfare Act (introduced in 1975 under the Third Labour government) was further implemented in 1978, including a non-taxable $8 a week allowance for parents supporting physically or mentally handicapped children. The basic family assistance tax structure was maintained in the 1978 budget, with the eligibility age of the youngest children increased to 11 years, the single-income family rebate raised to $5 per week, and the young-family rebate raised to $9 per week. A new income-tax scale was introduced, with the main aim being switching income from low-income recipients (who were usually supplementary earners) to main earners. A new income-tax scale (and higher rebates) was introduced in 1978, which transferred income to main earners, such as mothers who worked part-time. The purpose of this change was to increase the income of one-earner families relative to one-and-a-bit earner families.

In 1979, the period of absence from New Zealand during which eligibility for National Superannuation was retained was lowered to 3 months. Eligibility for the Additional benefit was extended to national superannuitants (1979). Equal eligibility for the unemployment benefit was introduced for married men and women. In the 1979 budget, the level of the national superannuation benefit for a married couple was lowered from a before-tax 80% of the before-tax average earnings to an after-tax 80% of the after-tax average earnings. Due to the progressive tax structure, this lowered the effective level of the benefit from 87% of after-tax average earnings to 80.% The 1979 budget reduced the effective levels of National Superannuation, the unemployment benefits for childless persons, and the additional benefit. However, social security spending increased by more than the expected rate of inflation, the family benefit was doubled, supplements to beneficiaries with children were increased, and the additional benefit was restructured.

=== Constitutional ===
The third National government introduced a Seal of New Zealand Act 1977, the Cabinet Manual and a new Letters Patent in 1983. It also introduced the Official Information Act 1982.

=== National identity ===
==== Waitangi Day ====
The government renamed New Zealand Day, established by the previous Third Labour Government, back to Waitangi Day in 1976 with the Waitangi Day Act 1976.

==== New Zealand Citizenship ====
When the Treaty of Waitangi made New Zealand a part of the British Empire, everyone born in New Zealand (regardless of race) became British citizens. Following New Zealand's adoption of the Statute of Westminster in the late 1940s, New Zealand citizenship was introduced, but in practice there was no real difference between New Zealand and British citizens (The term "British" was not dropped from New Zealand-issued passports until 1977). In the 1970s, Britain reacted to what was seen as excessive non-white migration from the Commonwealth by restricting migration from all Commonwealth countries. In response, New Zealand passed the Citizenship Act 1977, establishing completely separate citizenship, and British citizens began to be treated as legal aliens for the first time.

In the early 1980s there was also controversy over the citizenship status of Western Samoans. Western Samoa had been administered by New Zealand until its independence in 1962. However, Samoans – even those born under New Zealand rule – had no preferential access to New Zealand. This was challenged in the case of Lesa v The Attorney-General of New Zealand. Falema'i Lesa, a Samoan born in Samoa prior to independence, wanted to claim New Zealand citizenship under the Citizenship Act 1977. In July 1982 the Judicial Committee of the Privy Council held that Lesa (and by extension all other Samoans born prior to 1962) could apply for New Zealand citizenship. In response, the Citizenship (Western Samoa) Act 1982 was passed, and granted New Zealand citizenship to all Samoans living in New Zealand at that time, and a quota system for new arrivals was established.

==== National anthem ====
In 1977, and partially as a result of a petition presented to parliament the previous year, God Defend New Zealand was made New Zealand's national anthem, equal with God Save the Queen.

=== Immigration ===
Robert Muldoon continued his Labour predecessor Prime Minister Norman Kirk's policy of arresting and deporting Pasifika overstayers which had begun in 1974. Since the 1950s, the New Zealand government had encouraged substantial emigration from several Pacific countries including Samoa, Tonga, and Fiji to fill a labour shortage caused by the post–war economic boom. Consequently, the Pacific Islander population in New Zealand had grown to 45,413 by 1971, with a substantial number overstaying their visas. The economic crisis of the early 1970s led to increased crime, unemployment and other social ailments, which disproportionately affected the Pacific Islander community.

In July 1974, Muldoon as opposition leader had promised to cut immigration and to "get tough" on law and order issues. He criticised the Labour government's immigration policies for contributing to the economic recession and a housing shortage which undermined the New Zealand "way of life." During the 1975 general elections, the National Party had also played a controversial electoral advertisement that was later criticised for stoking negative racial sentiments about Polynesian migrants. Muldoon's government accelerated the Kirk government's police raids against Pacific overstayers. These operations involved special police squads conducting dawn raids on the homes of overstayers throughout New Zealand. Overstayers and their families were often deported back to their countries.

The Dawn Raids were widely condemned by different sections of New Zealand society including the Pacific Islander and Māori communities, church groups, employers and workers' unions, anti-racist groups, and the opposition Labour Party. The raids were also criticised by elements of the New Zealand Police and the ruling National Party for damaging race relations with the Pacific Island community. Critics also alleged that the Dawn Raids unfairly targeted Pacific Islanders since Pacific Islanders only comprised one-third of the overstayers but made up 86% of those arrested and prosecuted for overstaying. The majority of overstayers were from Great Britain, Australia, and South Africa. The Muldoon government's treatment of overstayers also damaged relations with Pacific countries like Samoa and Tonga, and generated criticism from the South Pacific Forum. By 1979, the Muldoon government terminated the Dawn Raids since the deportation of illegal Pacific overstayers had failed to alleviate the ailing New Zealand economy.

=== Treaty of Waitangi and Māori policy ===
In 1977, Ngati Whatua Māori occupied Bastion Point on the Waitematā Harbour, Auckland, in protest at the lack of settlement with the government under the Treaty of Waitangi for their claim to the land. The occupation was ended by New Zealand Army and Police units.

=== Foreign Affairs ===
Throughout the 1970s, the Republic of South Africa became increasingly unpopular for its racist apartheid policies. The third Labour government had blocked a proposed tour by the South African Springbok rugby team, but this had been opposed by many New Zealanders, who felt sport and politics should not mix. The third National government renewed sporting ties with South Africa, which resulted in many countries criticising New Zealand, and caused 28 African countries to boycott the 1976 Summer Olympics in protest at New Zealand's participation. Following this, Muldoon signed the Gleneagles Agreement stating that governments would take steps to prevent sporting contact with South Africa. Despite this, he refused to prevent the New Zealand Rugby Football Union from organising a tour by the Springboks in 1981. The 1981 Springbok Tour was marked by mass protest and violence from police, protesters and tour supporters.

The government supported Britain in the Falklands War, although New Zealand did not participate in it. However diplomatic ties with Argentina were cut and New Zealand loaned HMNZS Canterbury to Britain for service in the Indian Ocean to free up HMS Amazon for action in the Falklands.

The Closer Economic Relations free trade agreement with Australia was signed in 1983.

== Formation ==
The 1975 election was widely seen as a contest of personalities: Labour Prime Minister Bill Rowling vs National Party leader Robert Muldoon. The Labour government initially felt that this would be to their advantage, as Muldoon had an abrasive style which many New Zealanders found distasteful. Consequently, Labour organised a 'Citizens for Rowling' organisation of prominent New Zealanders which, despite its name, focussed primarily on attacking Muldoon. This backfired on Labour, partly because many people disliked being told how to vote and partly because many voters liked Muldoon's populist style. A group named 'Rob's Mob' was formed to support him.

Labour was not helped by Rowling's inexperience. He had taken office just one year previously, following the death of the immensely popular Norman Kirk. Compared to both Kirk and Muldoon, Rowling lacked charisma and was widely portrayed as weak and ineffective in the media.

National won the election with 47.6% of the vote and 55 out of 87 seats, giving it a 23-seat majority. Labour retained 32 seats. Minor parties Social Credit and Values both slightly increased their percentage of votes cast, but neither won any seats. The distribution of seats was the exact opposite of that following the 1972 election.

== The 1978 election ==
By 1978 Muldoon's combative style had become less appealing to voters, and Rowling consequently seemed a more attractive option than in 1975. National's share of the popular vote slumped from 47.6% in 1975 to 39.8%, slightly less than Labour's share. However this was not reflected in the number of seats won – National retained 51 seats, Labour won 40, and Social Credit re-entered parliament with one seat, despite winning 16.1% of the popular vote.

== The 1981 election ==
A key issue in this election was the 1981 Springbok Tour. The tour of apartheid-era South Africa's rugby union team was opposed by many New Zealanders, who believed that it gave support to apartheid. However it was supported by many others, who believed that politics and sport should be separate. Muldoon had refused to make the New Zealand Rugby Football Union call off the tour, while the Labour opposition had actively opposed it. Muldoon gambled that while the Tour would cost him votes in the cities, these would be mostly in Labour-supporting seats while swinging voters in smaller towns such as Taupō would support his stance. It has recently been argued that had New Zealand been defeated in the Tour, National would have lost the election.

The 1981 election was one which exposed the problems of New Zealand's First Past the Post electoral system. The Social Credit Party received 20.6% of votes cast, but only two seats. Perhaps more damningly, Labour won slightly more votes than National, but four fewer seats. This was the second election in a row in which this had happened, and contributed to New Zealand's switch to the proportional representation electoral system Mixed Member Proportional (MMP) in the 1990s.

The election left National with a majority of only one seat, a situation which was to cause it major problems in its third term.

== 1984 election and defeat ==
With a majority of only one, National's hold on power was always precarious. Its situation was made more difficult by the presence of several 'rogue MPs', including Marilyn Waring and Mike Minogue, who were openly dissatisfied with Muldoon and with the government's performance. For Muldoon, the final straw came when Waring announced she would support the Labour opposition's nuclear-free bill. On the night of 14 July 1984, Muldoon announced a snap election. In television footage of his announcement, he appears to be very drunk; however it is possible that his slurring may have had a partially or completely medical explanation.

In the lead up to the election, Muldoon grew increasingly unfavourable with voters for a number of reasons. The New Zealand public had become tired of the government's imposition of economic controls and restrictions and the government's unwillingness to reflect the increasingly liberal sentiment of the people. Furthermore, Muldoon's antagonistic style during campaigning and additionally the fact that he had been in power for nine years also deterred some voters. National's position was further weakened with the formation of the New Zealand Party, led by maverick property developer Bob Jones. The New Zealand Party supported free markets and a less paternalistic approach to governance – principles that many perceived to align closer to National's founding policy platform. As a result, the right-wing vote was ‘split’ as many of The New Zealand Party voters were likely taken from the National support base. National's loss in support can also be attributed to a generational shift of New Zealand voters and the desire for change in government. The contrast between the older, more cynical and ill-tempered Muldoon compared to the youthful, witty David Lange who led the Labour Party, further hindered National's chances of re-election.

National lost ten seats, while the New Zealand Party won 12.2% of the vote but no seats. Social Credit's share of seats remained unchanged at two. The Labour Party became the Fourth Labour government with 56 seats and a comfortable majority of 17.

== Election results ==
Election	Parliament	Seats	Total votes	Percentage	Gain (loss)	Seats won	Change	Majority
1975	38th	87	763,136	47.59%	+6.09%	55	+23	23
1978	39th	92	680,991	39.82%	-7.77%	51	-4	10
1981	40th	92	698,508	38.77%	-1.05%	47	-4	1
1984	41st	95	692,494	35.89%	-2.88%	37	-10	-

== Prime minister ==
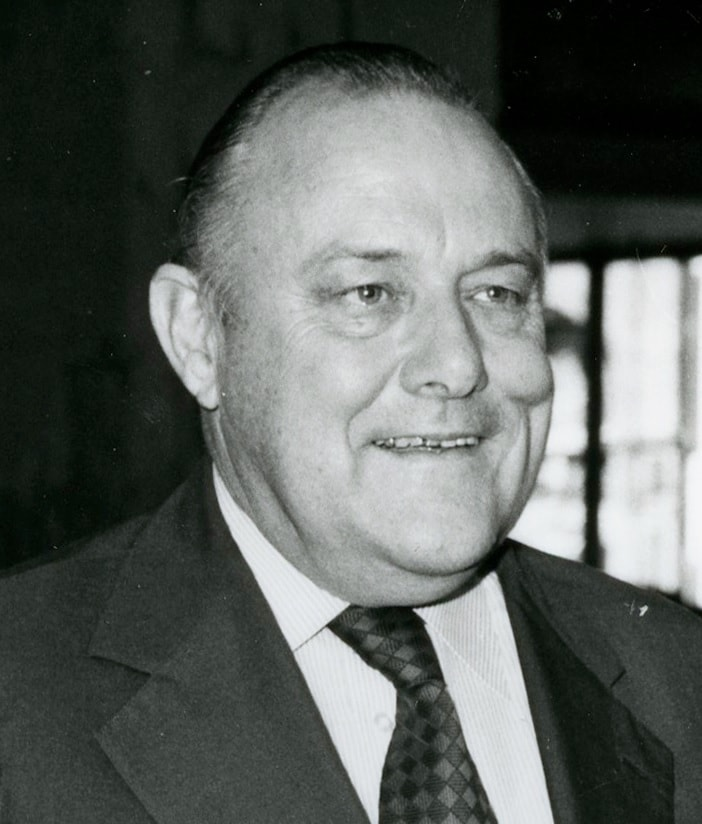
Robert Muldoon served as Prime Minister from 1975 to 1984.

Robert Muldoon was prime minister for all three terms of the Third National government, from 12 December 1975 to 26 July 1984.

== Cabinet ministers ==
Portfolio	Minister	Start	End
Prime Minister	Robert Muldoon	12 December 1975	26 July 1984
Deputy Prime Minister	Brian Talboys	12 December 1975	4 March 1981
Deputy Prime Minister	Duncan MacIntyre	4 March 1981	15 March 1984
Deputy Prime Minister	Jim McLay	15 March 1984	26 July 1984
Minister of Agriculture	Duncan MacIntyre	12 December 1975	26 July 1984
Attorney-General	Peter Wilkinson	12 December 1975	13 December 1978
Attorney-General	Jim McLay	13 December 1978	26 July 1984
Minister of Broadcasting	Hugh Templeton	12 December 1975	12 February 1981
Minister of Broadcasting	Warren Cooper	12 February 1981	11 December 1981
Minister of Broadcasting	Ian Shearer	11 December 1981	26 July 1984
Minister of Civil Defence	Allan Highet	12 December 1975	26 July 1984
Minister of Customs	Peter Wilkinson	12 December 1975	13 December 1978
Minister of Customs	Hugh Templeton	13 December 1978	15 June 1982
Minister of Customs	Keith Allen	15 June 1982	26 July 1984
Minister of Defence	Allan McCready	12 December 1975	13 December 1978
Minister of Defence	Frank Gill	13 December 1978	21 August 1980
Minister of Defence	David Thomson	21 August 1980	26 July 1984
Minister of Education	Les Gandar	12 December 1975	13 December 1978
Minister of Education	Merv Wellington	13 December 1978	26 July 1984
Minister of Energy	Eric Holland	12 December 1975	8 March 1977
Minister of Energy	George Gair	8 March 1977	13 December 1978
Minister of Energy	Bill Birch	13 December 1978	26 July 1984
Minister for the Environment	Venn Young	12 December 1975	12 February 1981
Minister for the Environment	David Thomson	12 February 1981	26 July 1984
Minister of Finance	Robert Muldoon	12 December 1975	26 July 1984
Minister of Foreign Affairs	Brian Talboys	12 December 1975	11 December 1981
Minister of Foreign Affairs	Warren Cooper	11 December 1981	26 July 1984
Minister of Forestry	Venn Young	12 December 1975	11 December 1981
Minister of Forestry	Jonathan Elworthy	11 December 1981	26 July 1984
Minister of Health	Frank Gill	12 December 1975	13 December 1978
Minister of Health	George Gair	13 December 1978	11 December 1981
Minister of Health	Aussie Malcolm	11 December 1981	26 July 1984
Minister of Housing	George Gair	12 December 1975	8 March 1977
Minister of Housing	Eric Holland	8 March 1977	13 December 1978
Minister of Housing	Derek Quigley	13 December 1978	15 June 1982
Minister of Housing	Tony Friedlander	15 June 1982	26 July 1984
Minister of Immigration	Frank Gill	12 December 1975	13 December 1978
Minister of Immigration	Jim Bolger	13 December 1978	12 February 1981
Minister of Immigration	Aussie Malcolm	12 February 1981	26 July 1984
Minister of Internal Affairs	Allan Highet	12 December 1975	26 July 1984
Minister of Justice	David Thomson	12 December 1975	13 December 1978
Minister of Justice	Jim McLay	13 December 1978	26 July 1984
Minister of Labour	Peter Gordon	12 December 1975	13 December 1978
Minister of Labour	Jim Bolger	13 December 1978	26 July 1984
Minister of Local Government	Allan Highet	12 December 1975	26 July 1984
Minister of Māori Affairs	Duncan MacIntyre	12 December 1975	13 December 1978
Minister of Māori Affairs	Ben Couch	13 December 1978	26 July 1984
Minister of Mines	Eric Holland	12 December 1975	8 March 1977
Minister of Mines	George Gair	8 March 1977	6 October 1977
Minister of Overseas Trade	Brian Talboys	12 December 1975	11 December 1981
Minister of Overseas Trade	Warren Cooper	11 December 1981	26 July 1984
Minister of Police	Allan McCready	12 December 1975	13 December 1978
Minister of Police	Frank Gill	13 December 1978	21 August 1980
Minister of Police	Ben Couch	21 August 1980	26 July 1984
Postmaster-General	Hugh Templeton	12 December 1975	8 March 1977
Postmaster-General	Peter Wilkinson	8 March 1977	13 December 1978
Postmaster-General	Ben Couch	13 December 1978	22 August 1980
Postmaster-General	Warren Cooper	22 August 1980	11 December 1981
Postmaster-General	John Falloon	11 December 1981	19 February 1982
Postmaster-General	Rob Talbot	19 February 1982	26 July 1984
Minister of Railways	Colin McLachlan	12 December 1975	11 December 1981
Minister of Railways	George Gair	11 December 1981	26 July 1984
Minister for Social Welfare	Bert Walker	12 December 1975	13 December 1978
Minister for Social Welfare	George Gair	13 December 1978	12 February 1981
Minister for Social Welfare	Venn Young	12 February 1981	26 July 1984
Minister for Sport and Recreation	Allan Highet	12 December 1975	26 July 1984
Minister of Statistics	Peter Wilkinson	25 April 1975	8 March 1977
Minister of Statistics	Hugh Templeton	8 March 1977	11 December 1981
Minister of Statistics	John Falloon	11 December 1981	26 July 1984
Minister of Tourism	Harry Lapwood	12 December 1975	13 December 1978
Minister of Tourism	Warren Cooper	13 December 1978	12 February 1981
Minister of Tourism	Derek Quigley	12 February 1981	11 December 1981
Minister of Tourism	Rob Talbot	11 December 1981	26 July 1984
Minister of Trade and Industry	Lance Adams-Schneider	12 December 1975	11 December 1981
Minister of Trade and Industry	Hugh Templeton	11 December 1981	26 July 1984
Minister of Transport	Colin McLachlan	12 December 1975	11 December 1981
Minister of Transport	George Gair	11 December 1981	26 July 1984
Minister of Works	Bill Young	12 December 1975	11 December 1981
Minister of Works	Derek Quigley	11 December 1981	15 June 1982
Minister of Works	Tony Friedlander	15 June 1982	26 July 1984

== See also ==
- List of New Zealand governments
- New Zealand National Party
- Political history of New Zealand#Conservative rule under Robert Muldoon, 1975–1984

== Sources ==
- Anae, Melanie (2012). "Overstayers, Dawn Raids and the Polynesian Panthers". In Sean, Mallon (ed.). Tangata O Le Moana: New Zealand and the People of the Pacific. Te Papa Press. ISBN 978-1-877385-72-8.
- Parker, John (2005). Frontier of Dreams: The Story of New Zealand—Into the 21st Century, 1946-2005. Auckland: TVNZ and Scholastic. pp. 28–29, 64–65.
- Templeton, Hugh (1995). All Honourable Men: Inside the Muldoon Cabinet 1975–1984. Auckland: Auckland University Press. ISBN 1-86940-128-X.
