= 1984 New Zealand constitutional crisis =

Crisis in NZ during the 1984 change of government

Robert Muldoon Prime Minister 1975–1984	David Lange Prime Minister 1984–1989

The New Zealand constitutional crisis of 1984 arose following the 1984 general election, and was caused by a major currency crisis. The crisis led the incoming government to review New Zealand's constitutional structures, which resulted in the Constitution Act 1986.

== Background ==
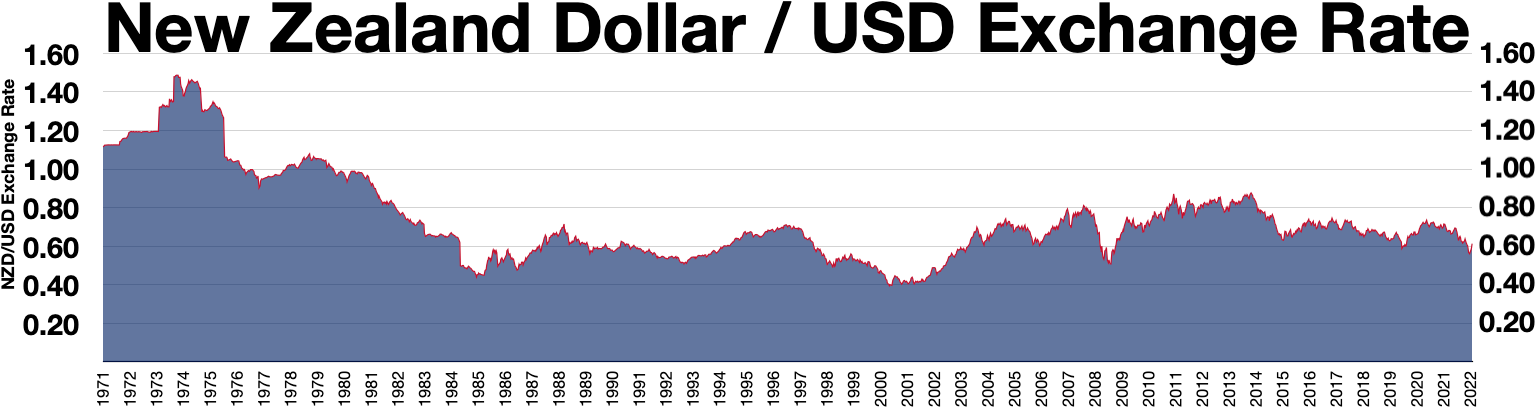
NZD / USD exchange rate

Prior to 1985 the New Zealand dollar was controlled centrally by the Reserve Bank of New Zealand at an exchange rate fixed to the United States dollar. In early 1984 the Deputy Governor of the Reserve Bank, Roderick Deane, became concerned that the New Zealand dollar had become significantly overvalued and was vulnerable to currency speculation on the financial markets in the event of a "significant political event".

== Currency crisis ==
At the time, New Zealand was led by Prime Minister Sir Robert Muldoon and his National Party government. Media speculation followed a leak that a potential incoming Labour government would be likely to significantly devalue the dollar upon election. The Reserve Bank advised Muldoon, who was also the minister of finance, that the dollar should be devalued. Muldoon ignored the advice, believing it would hurt poorer New Zealanders in the medium term. In June 1984, as a result of dissension within his own parliamentary caucus, Muldoon announced a snap election to be held in July. This caused an immediate run on the dollar, as currency speculators believed a Labour win would mean devaluation. Despite a deepening foreign exchange crisis, Muldoon continued to refuse to devalue, forcing the Reserve Bank to take some extraordinary steps, such as closing the forex markets for a short period of time to slow down devaluation.

On 14 July, Muldoon and the National Party lost the general election, and the Fourth Labour government led by David Lange was set to be sworn in on 26 July.

== Constitutional crisis develops ==
By New Zealand constitutional convention, between election day and the return of the writs for the election, an outgoing caretaker government implements the directions of an incoming government.

=== 15 July ===
On the morning of Sunday 15 July, Reserve Bank officials (Reserve Bank Governor Spencer Russell, deputy Roderick Deane, and Treasury Secretary Bernie Galvin) met with the head of the Prime Minister's Department Gerald Hensley, and agreed that the currency market could not open on Monday unless there was a devaluation. Contacted by Hensley, Muldoon refused to meet that afternoon but told him that they could close the market on Monday if they liked, and agreed to meet them at 8:30 am on Monday 16 July. Russell closed the market on Sunday evening. The Reserve Bank officials also wrote a letter to Lange, and a senior Treasury officer unofficially briefed the incoming Finance Minister Roger Douglas on the situation.

=== 16 July ===
After their meeting on Monday morning, Russell and Galvin boarded a flight to Auckland in order to advise Lange, and Deane reluctantly briefed Labour's Deputy Leader Geoffrey Palmer, before escaping from waiting journalists through a back door. Muldoon called Lange at 10:30 am and suggested they make a joint statement that the currency would not be devalued. Lange said he would give Muldoon an answer after meeting with Russell and Galvin. The meeting, which also included Douglas and his incoming associate finance minister David Caygill, took place at Auckland International Airport. On being advised that a joint statement would not solve the currency problem, Lange told Russell and Galvin to inform Muldoon there would be no joint statement. Lange then travelled to unrelated meetings with the U.S. Secretary of State in Ohakea and the Australian Foreign Minister in Wellington, before returning to Auckland. Meanwhile, Russell and Galvin decided while travelling back to Wellington that they should not tell Muldoon, but that Lange should do so himself. Muldoon was left waiting for a response and despite Hensley's appeals to Galvin, received none before going home around 5 pm. His wife told him to have a rest and took the phone off the hook without telling him. By now, Deane had decided Muldoon had to be told what had happened, but could not reach Muldoon by phone.

Lange had meanwhile imposed a 24-hour news blackout on the currency problem, and was reported in the 6:30 pm television news as saying that Muldoon was "refusing his advice on the matter". Muldoon had his press secretary issue a statement that this was untrue, and agreed to a television interview with Richard Harman that evening. Shortly afterward he received a handwritten note from Deane explaining the situation, followed by a letter from Lange. In the interview, Muldoon went over the events of the day from his perspective. He said Lange had not yet responded to him, that "I am not going to devalue, as long as I am Minister of Finance", and that he hoped Lange would agree tomorrow not to devalue. Prime Minister elect David Lange responded with an interview of his own. He stated: "This nation is at risk. That is how basic it is. This Prime Minister outgoing, beaten, has, in the course of one television interview tried to do more damage to the New Zealand economy than any statement ever made. He has actually alerted the world to a crisis. And like King Canute he stands there and says everyone is wrong but me".

=== 17 July ===
Following the interviews, a further crisis was triggered in the foreign exchange markets: when the exchange opened on 17 July, millions of foreign exchange dollars left the country as currency speculators expected a devaluation of the New Zealand dollar. Lange later remarked "We actually were reduced to asking our diplomatic posts abroad how much money they could draw down on their credit cards! That is the extent of the calamity that had been ground into us by the briefings that we'd got".

=== 18 July (resolution) ===
Roderick Deane and Spencer Russell then spoke to several senior ministers within the National Party caucus. On the morning on Wednesday 18 July, after an emergency caucus meeting, Muldoon relented and agreed to devalue the currency upon Lange's wishes. Muldoon's most senior Cabinet members, led by the soon to be Leader Jim McLay, had threatened to remove Muldoon from his leadership of the National Party and thereby strip him of his post as Prime Minister and Minister of Finance. Outgoing deputy prime minister Jim McLay and incoming Labour Deputy Prime Minister Geoffrey Palmer had key roles in persuading Muldoon to step down. They advocated a 'caretaker convention' despite it not existing formally. McLay drafted the convention and presented it in a press statement on 17 July, where it became recognised as the 'caretaker convention'. The New Zealand dollar was devalued by 20%. In a 1994 documentary on the crisis, former Cabinet minister Hugh Templeton confirmed that McLay, working with Bill Birch and Jim Bolger, was ready to approach the Governor-General, Sir David Beattie to have Muldoon removed as Prime Minister (Beattie had suggested he could remove Muldoon prior to the Cabinet meeting on 19 July).

== Result ==
As a result of the constitutional crisis, the incoming Labour Government convened the Officials Committee on Constitutional Reform to review New Zealand's constitutional law, and the Constitution Act 1986 resulted from the two reports by this committee. The issue of the transfer of power from incumbent to elect governments (and hence prime ministers) was not resolved by this act, however, and the transfer of executive powers remains an unwritten constitutional convention, known as the 'caretaker convention' which was developed by Jim McLay.

== Dramatisation ==
A television mini-series, Fallout, dramatising both the events surrounding the crisis and the initiation of New Zealand's nuclear-free policy (a major plank of Labour's 1984 election campaign) was produced in New Zealand in 1995. This mini-series, written by Greg McGee and Tom Scott, starred Mark Mitchell as Lange and Ian Mune as Muldoon.

== Sources ==
- His Way: A Biography of Robert Muldoon. Auckland: Auckland University Press. 2000. ISBN 1-86940-236-7.
- Russell, Marcia (1996). Revolution:New Zealand from Fortress to Free Market. Hodder Moa Beckett. ISBN 1869584287.
