= Rogernomics =

Economic policy in 1980s New Zealand

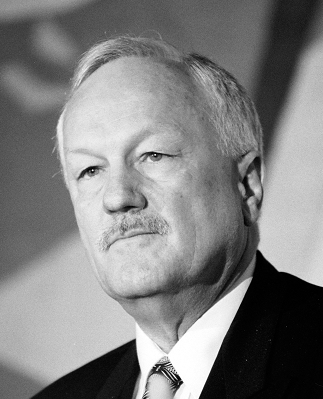
Roger Douglas in 1996

Rogernomics (a portmanteau of Roger and economics modelled on Reaganomics) were the neoliberal economic reforms promoted by Roger Douglas, the Minister of Finance between 1984 and 1988 in the Fourth Labour Government of New Zealand. Rogernomics featured market-led restructuring and deregulation and the control of inflation through tight monetary policy, accompanied by a floating exchange-rate and reductions in the fiscal deficit.

During the early 1980s, Douglas transitioned from a traditional Labour politician advocating for economic interventionism to a proponent of neoliberal economics. After the Labour Party won government in 1984, Douglas and his associates implemented major policies including a 20% devaluation of the dollar, corporatisation of state-owned business, removal of subsidies to industries (particularly agricultural subsidies), reduction of tariff protection, and a significant overhaul of the tax system. Tax cuts were implemented, and a Goods and Services Tax (initially set at 10%) was introduced.

Rogernomics represented a sharp departure from the post-war political consensus that emphasised heavy interventionism, protectionism, and full employment. Instead, it embraced principles of small government, balanced budgets, and free market policies influenced by the Chicago school of economics. Douglas' adoption of policies more usually associated with the political right (or New Right), and their implementation by a government formed by the historically left-leaning Labour Party, became the subject of lasting controversy.

== Etymology ==
In February 1985, journalists at the New Zealand Listener coined the term Rogernomics as a portmanteau of Roger and economics. It echoes "Reaganomics", similar neoliberal economic policies promoted by United States President Ronald Reagan in the 1980s.

== Douglas and the development of economic policy, 1969–1983 ==
Douglas became a Labour member of Parliament at the 1969 general election. He showed his interest in economic policy in his maiden speech, in which he argued against foreign investment in the domestic economy. His case for external protection of the domestic economy and government involvement in investment was characteristic of the Labour Party of the time. From 1972 to 1975, Douglas was a junior minister in the Third Labour Government, where he won a reputation for his capacity for innovation. This government followed a broadly Keynesian approach to economic management.

As a minister, Douglas was innovative in the context of the public sector. As Broadcasting Minister he devised an administrative structure in which two publicly owned television channels competed against each other. He was among the government’s leading advocates of compulsory saving for retirement, which he saw not only as a supplement to public provision for retirement but as a source of funding for public investment in economic development. The superannuation scheme he helped design became law in 1974, but was disestablished by Robert Muldoon almost as soon as the National Party won the 1975 election.

Douglas maintained his interest in economic issues in opposition. He framed his chief concern as the deep-seated problems in the structure of the economy that had contributed to deteriorating economic performance, and a standard of living that was slipping in comparison to that of other developed countries. In 1980, he described New Zealand as a country living on borrowed money, unable – in spite of the record efforts of its exporters – to pay its own way in the world.

The post-war political consensus had produced stability but Douglas came to view this as being at the cost of innovation. Both major political parties maintained the high levels of protection introduced by the First Labour Government from 1936 onwards, and since 1945 both parties had aimed at maintaining full employment. However, beneficiaries of the regulated economy had flourished in both public and private sectors.

Douglas argued that only radical action would improve the economic outlook. In 1980, he published an "Alternative Budget" that attacked what Douglas called the Muldoon government's "tinkering" with the economy. He wrote that twenty years of pandering to entrenched interests had dampened productive investment. The Labour leadership saw his proposals and their unauthorised publication as unfavourable comment on Labour policy. The Labour leader Bill Rowling publicly rebuked Douglas. Douglas then published his thinking in the form of a book. Alongside far-reaching proposals for reform of taxation and government spending, it advocated a twenty per cent devaluation of the dollar to increase the competitiveness of exports. Although radical, it took an eclectic approach and did not hint at the abandonment of Labour's Keynesian policy framework.

Douglas became increasingly frustrated by what he saw as the Labour Party's reluctance to deal with fundamental issues of economic policy. He claimed in 1981 that Labour had an image as a party that would promise the public anything to be elected. He argued that the party should agree on its economic policy before it agreed on anything else, and allow economic reality to play a part in its decision-making. Unable to convince Rowling of the merit of his case, a disillusioned Douglas decided to stand down from parliament at the 1981 election. One of those who persuaded him to stay was Labour’s deputy leader David Lange, who offered to make Douglas minister of finance if Lange was prime minister after the 1984 election.

=== Events after the 1981 election ===
After Labour's narrow loss in the 1981 election, Douglas found a growing audience in the parliamentary party for his view that Labour's established approach to economic policy was deficient. His colleague Mike Moore claimed that there was a public perception that Labour policy sought "to reward the lazy and defend bludgers". Douglas's case for a radical approach was strengthened by the belief among many of his parliamentary colleagues that the economy's deep-seated problems could only be solved by extensive restructuring. It was understood that some restructuring must follow the Closer Economic Relations agreement with Australia, which took effect in 1981 and reduced barriers to trade between Australia and New Zealand. At the same time, many economists were arguing for the greater use of competition as a tool of policy, and expressing concern about excessive or inappropriate regulation of the economy. In 1983, Lange succeeded Rowling as Labour leader. He gave Douglas responsibility for economic policy and made it clear that economic policy would determine other policy.

Although Douglas was innovative in his approach, and his open disregard for Rowling had earned him a reputation as a maverick, he remained within the mainstream of economic thinking in the parliamentary Labour Party. He argued in 1982 that the government should actively support small business, and intervene to stop the aggregation of assets by big business. In his view, the government should use the tax system to encourage productive investment and discourage speculative investment. Until the end of 1983, Douglas saw exchange rate, tax and protection policies as means of actively shaping the business environment. In August 1982 he supported a contributory superannuation scheme as a means of funding industrial development and in February 1983 he wrote a paper called "Picking Winners for Investment" which proposed the establishment of local consultative groups to guide regional development. In a paper dated May 1983, Douglas argued that an unregulated market led to unhealthy concentrations of market power.

== A new direction, 1983–1984 ==
At the end of 1983 there was a marked change in Douglas's thinking. He prepared a caucus paper called the "Economic Policy Package" which called for a market-led restructuring of the economy. The key proposal was a 20 per cent devaluation of the dollar, to be followed by the removal of subsidies to industry, border protection and export incentives. The paper doubted the value of "picking winners" and saw only a limited place for government funding of economic development. His colleague Stan Rodger described the paper as a "quite unacceptable leap to the right". It immediately polarised opinion in the Labour Party.

Douglas characterised the policy package as restrained and responsible, and an appropriate response to the country's economic difficulties. He acknowledged the contribution to the package of Doug Andrew, a Treasury officer on secondment to the parliamentary opposition, among others. W H Oliver noted the close alignment of the package and Economic Management, Treasury's 1984 briefing to the incoming government. His assessment was that Douglas was predisposed towards the Treasury view because its implementation required decisive action and because greater reliance on the market solved what Douglas saw as the problem of interest-group participation in policy-making.

Division in Labour over economic policy crystallised when a competing proposal was submitted to the Labour Party's Policy Council. Its proponents included Rowling and others who had resisted his replacement as leader. It argued for a Keynesian use of monetary and fiscal policy. It was sceptical about the ability of the private sector to promote economic development. Economic restructuring was to be led by the government, which would act within a consultative framework. In this way, the social costs of restructuring would be avoided.

There was stalemate in the Policy Council. As the 1984 election drew closer, Labour's deputy leader Geoffrey Palmer drafted a compromise that contained elements of both proposals. The Palmer paper was broadly worded, and it made no mention of devaluation. It anticipated some form of understanding between government and unions about wage restraint. It allowed for extensive consultation about economic policy and stated that necessary structural change would be gradual and agreed. When Muldoon unexpectedly called an early general election, the Labour Party adopted Palmer's paper as its economic policy. Lange said that Labour went into the election with an unfinished argument doing duty as its economic policy.

== Minister of Finance, 1984–1988 ==
In 1984, Roger Douglas was made Minister of Finance, with two associate ministers of finance, David Caygill and Richard Prebble. They became known as the "Treasury Troika" or the "Troika", and became the most powerful group in Cabinet. Douglas was the strategist, Prebble the tactician, while Caygill mastered the details. With Caygill the "nice cop" and Prebble the "nasty cop", Douglas could sometimes appear as steering a considered middle course. Later Trevor de Cleene was made undersecretary to Douglas, with special responsibility for Inland Revenue.

The key element of Douglas's economic thinking was implemented after Labour won the 1984 election but before it was formally sworn into office. This was the 20 per cent devaluation of the New Zealand dollar. The announcement of the snap election immediately provoked selling of the dollar by dealers who anticipated that a change of government would lead to a substantial devaluation. The result was a currency crisis that became a matter of public knowledge two days after the general election. Muldoon refused to accept official advice that devaluation was the only way to stop the currency crisis and provoked a brief constitutional crisis when he initially refused to implement the incoming government’s instruction that he devalue. Both crises were soon settled when accepted that he had no choice but to devalue after Muldoon's National Party colleagues threatened to approach the Governor General to dismiss him. Although devaluation was a contentious issue in the Labour Party and was not part of Labour's election policy, the decisiveness with which the incoming government acted won it popular acclaim and enhanced Douglas's standing in the new cabinet.

The reformers argued that the speed with which the reforms were made was due to the fact that New Zealand had not adjusted to Britain's abandonment of the empire, and had to move quickly to "catch up" with the rest of the world. Douglas claimed in his 1993 book Unfinished Business that speed was a key strategy for achieving radical economic change: "Define your objectives clearly, and move towards them in quantum leaps, otherwise the interest groups will have time to mobilise and drag you down". Political commentator Bruce Jesson argued that Douglas acted fast to achieve a complete economic revolution within one parliamentary term, in case he did not get a second chance. The reforms can be summarised as the dismantling of the Australasian orthodoxy of state development that had existed for the previous 90 years, and its replacement by the Anglo-American neo-classical model based on the monetarist policies of Milton Friedman and the Chicago School. The financial market was deregulated and controls on foreign exchange removed. Subsidies to many industries, notably agriculture, were removed or significantly reduced, as was tariff protection. The top marginal tax rate was halved over a number of years from 66% to 33%, and the standard rate was reduced from 42% in 1978 to 28% in 1988. To compensate, the variable sales taxes that had been in effect until then were replaced by a single Goods and Services Tax, initially set at 10%, later 12.5% (and eventually in 2011, 15%), and a surtax on superannuation, which had been made universal from age 60 by the previous government.

== Immediate results ==
New Zealand's leap into the neoliberal global economy exposed both businesses and the wider workforce to the unregulated practices of private capital – this led to a decade of insignificant (and sometimes negative) growth with the "economic miracle" being experienced by only a relatively small proportion of the population. With no restrictions on overseas money coming into the country the focus in the economy shifted from the productive sector to finance. Finance capital outstripped industrial capital and redundancies occurred in manufacturing industry; approximately 76,000 manufacturing jobs were lost between 1987 and 1992. The new state-owned enterprises created from 1 April 1987 began to shed thousands of jobs adding to unemployment:

Redundancies by SOE
State-Owned Enterprise	Redundancies
Electricity Corporation	3,000
Coal Corporation	4,000
Forestry Corporation	5,000
New Zealand Post	8,000

The newly unfettered business environment created by the deregulation of the financial sector, David Grant writes, left New Zealanders "easy targets for speculators and their agents", exacerbating the effects of the October 1987 stock market crash.

During wage bargaining in 1986 and 1987, employers started to bargain harder. Lock-outs were not uncommon; the most spectacular occurred at a pulp and paper mill owned by Fletcher Challenge and led to changes to work practices and a no-strike commitment from the union. Later settlements drew further concessions from unions, including below-inflation wage increases, and an effective real wage cut. There was a structural change in the economy from industry to services, which, along with the arrival of trans-Tasman retail chains and an increasingly cosmopolitan hospitality industry, led to a new ‘café culture’ enjoyed by more affluent New Zealanders. Some argue that for the rest of the population, Rogernomics failed to deliver the higher standard of living promised by its advocates.

Over 15 years, New Zealand's economy and social capital faced serious problems: the proliferation of food banks increased dramatically to an estimated 365 in 1994; the number of New Zealanders estimated to be living in poverty grew by at least 35% between 1989 and 1992 while child poverty doubled from 14% in 1982 to 29% in 1994. Those on low incomes failed to return to the 1984 standard of living until 1996; the lowest 30% did not recover their own 1980s living standards for twenty years. The health of the New Zealand population was also especially hard-hit, leading to a significant deterioration in health standards among working and middle-class people. In addition, many of the promised economic benefits of the experiment never materialised. Between 1985 and 1992, New Zealand's economy grew by 4.7% during the same period in which the average OECD nation grew by 28.2%. From 1984 to 1993 inflation averaged 9% per year and New Zealand's credit rating dropped twice. Between 1986 and 1992, the unemployment rate rose from 3.6% to 11%.

Rogernomics, however, has been credited with a number of other positive impacts on the New Zealand economy: inflation, which had reached a high of 17.15% in 1980, has been in single digits every year since the end of Douglas' tenure as finance minister; and income tax rates were halved, while gross national income per capita almost doubled, from US$6,950 in 1984 to US$13,640 in 1990. Other supporters of Rogernomics have argued that many statistics do not take into account the improvements in consumer goods it brought, transforming New Zealand from a country where permits were needed to buy overseas magazines, and where prices were high and choice was limited, into a country with a range of consumer goods available similar to those enjoyed by other western democracies. Douglas himself has claimed that the unwillingness of subsequent governments to alter any of his reforms is a testament to their quality.

== Legacy ==
The policies of Ruth Richardson, sometimes called "Ruthanasia", were a continuation of Rogernomics. Richardson served as Finance Minister in the National Party government from 1990 to 1993. Beginning with the Mother of all Budgets, the National Government expanded these policies by drastically cutting spending, deregulating labour markets, and further asset sales.

In 1990 David Lange said of the Government:

"It is there to be the securer of its citizen[s'] welfare. Where the market works well, it should be given its head. Where the market results in manifest inequity, or poor economic performance, the Government must get involved."

After Rogernomics, the New Zealand Labour Party was paralysed by infighting for much of their time in opposition, initially led by Mike Moore as leader of the Opposition (1990–1993). Moore was then followed by Helen Clark, whose first term as leader of the Opposition was undermined by those who opposed her leadership. Some later left to form their own political parties ACT, the Alliance, and United (later United Future). Clark for her part survived these internal leadership scuffles and Labour stabilised under her leadership during the third and final term of the Jim Bolger and Jenny Shipley ministries. Much like Tony Blair in the United Kingdom, Clark assumed a compromise solution to social exclusion and poverty, combining advocacy of the open economy and of free trade with greater emphasis on fighting the consequences of neoliberal policies. Labour became loosely aligned with the Third Way between 1999 and 2008.

The ACT Party, co-founded by Roger Douglas in 1993 to participate in the 1996 MMP election, is the heir to Rogernomics and continues to advance free-market policies. In 1990s New Zealand, advocates of radical economic policies were often branded as "rogergnomes" by their opponents, linking their views to Douglas's and to the supposed baleful influence of international bankers, characterised as the "Gnomes of Zurich".

A 2015 Treasury report said that inequality in New Zealand increased in the 1980s and 1990s but has been stable for the last 20 years. However, another 2015 article reported that New Zealand's rate of rise of inequality had been the highest in the OECD, and that New Zealand's inequality had previously been low by OECD standards.

== See also ==
- Economy of New Zealand
- Monetarism – School of thought in monetary economics
- Neoliberalism – Political ideology promoting free-market capitalism
- Post-war displacement of Keynesianism – Economic doctrines changes in the late 1970s
- Political history of New Zealand
