= Trevor de Cleene =

New Zealand politician

The Honourable Trevor de Cleene OBE
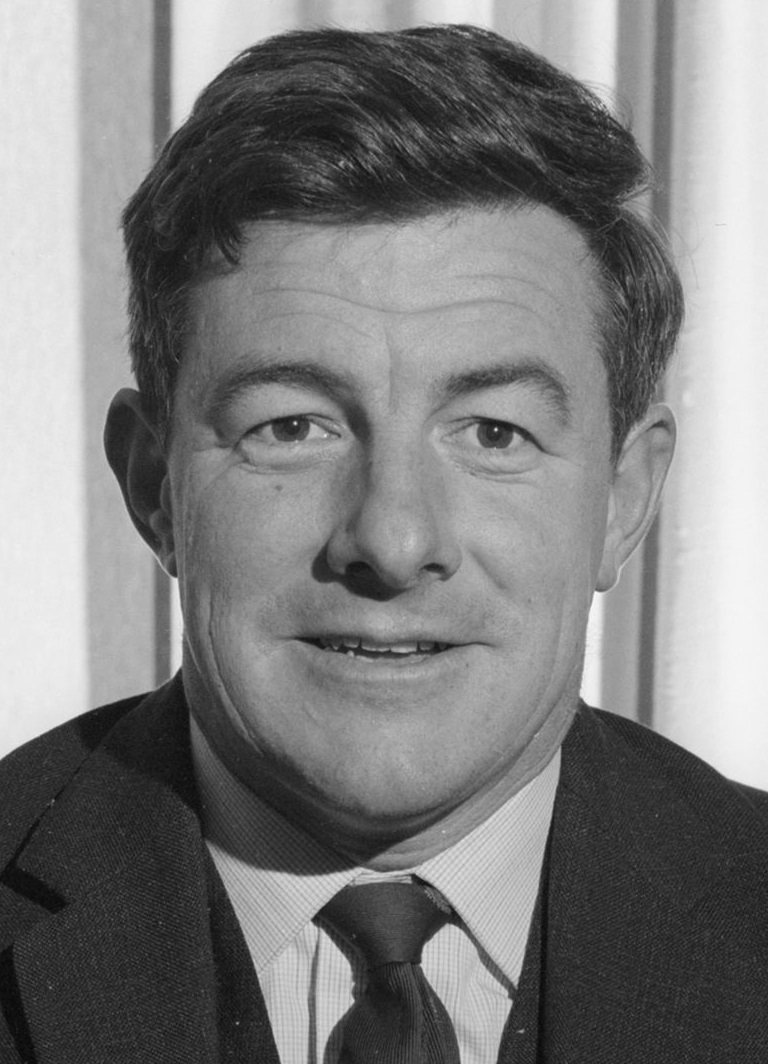
- de Cleene in 1969

18th Minister of Revenue
- In office 24 August 1987 – 15 December 1988
- Prime Minister: David Lange
- Preceded by: Roger Douglas
- Succeeded by: David Caygill

50th Minister of Customs
- In office 24 August 1987 – 15 December 1988
- Prime Minister: David Lange
- Preceded by: Margaret Shields
- Succeeded by: Margaret Shields

Under-Secretary of Finance
- In office 26 July 1984 – 24 August 1987
- Prime Minister: David Lange

Member of the New Zealand Parliament for Palmerston North
- In office 28 November 1981 – 27 October 1990
- Preceded by: Joe Walding
- Succeeded by: Steve Maharey

Personal details
- Born: 24 March 1933 Palmerston North, New Zealand
- Died: 22 April 2001 (aged 68) Tauranga, New Zealand
- Party: Labour (1952–1993)
- Other political affiliations: ACT (1994–1996); National (1996–2001)
- Profession: Lawyer

Trevor Albert de Cleene OBE (24 March 1933 – 22 April 2001) was a New Zealand politician and lawyer. After gaining experience as a councillor with Palmerston North City Council, he was elected to Parliament for the Labour Party in 1981. He was a strong supporter of Rogernomics and was a minister outside cabinet. He resigned his ministerial portfolios in 1988 when Roger Douglas was sacked by David Lange. For his remaining parliamentary career, he was a backbencher known as one of the Three Musketeers. Later, he was a founding member of ACT New Zealand and some years later joined the National Party to help oppose Winston Peters in Tauranga.

== Early life ==
De Cleene was born in Palmerston North on 24 March 1933; the first Palmerston North MP who was actually born in the city. His parents were poor and he was born during the Great Depression. The family moved frequently until they finally obtained state housing. He attended Palmerston North Intermediate Normal School, then Palmerston North Boys' High School and left school in 1951. He studied law at the University of Canterbury before changing to the Faculty of Law of Victoria University. There, he won the Law Moot Prize in 1954 and graduated LLB in 1955, having achieved Senior Law Scholar in his final year. He financed his degree by working several seasons at the freezing works in Feilding.

== Family and personal interests ==
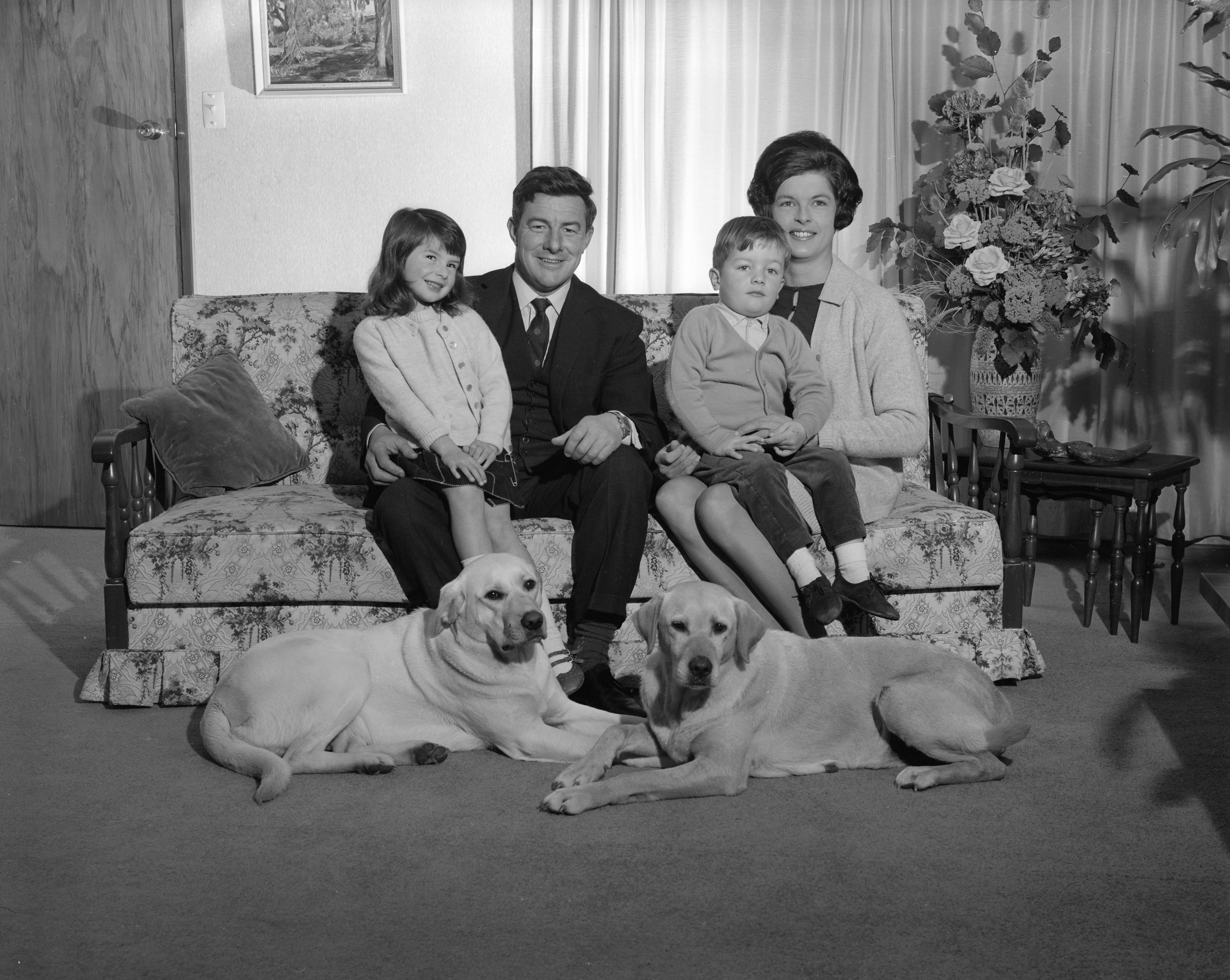
de Cleene and his family in 1969

On 12 October 1962, he married Gwenda Doris Taylor and they had one girl (born 1964) and two boys (born 1966 and 1970, respectively). They divorced in 1976 and he remarried in 1982 to Raewyn Watt.

He played hockey for Canterbury University, then Victoria University and finally Hockey Manawatu. He loved the outdoors and enjoyed hunting, fishing and shooting. He made potential enemies through defending high-profile criminals and his controversial policies as a politician, and once revealed that he kept a pump-action shotgun under his bed for personal protection. He was interested in race horses and after successfully defending a client's drink driving charge, he purchased a race horse which he called Breathalyser.

== Professional career ==
Law seemed an ideal profession for de Cleene. He was a gifted scholar, was good with words and loved public speaking. He was a good debater, was witty and a very quick thinker. Due to his presentation, he quickly became the centre of attention wherever he went. He was admitted to the bar in 1956 and started his professional career working for Innes and Oakley in Palmerston North. His move to start his own practice was summed up by himself as follows: "I crossed the street and put up my own plate." Between 1966 and 1970, he shared the practice with Bob Calkin. For the next two years, he practised on his own again, and beginning in 1973, he was with Loughnan, de Cleene and Co for three years.

1976 saw him move to Tauranga, where he practised on his own. In the following year, he returned to Palmerston North and continued as a partner with Loughnan, de Cleene & Co until his election to Parliament.

He specialised in criminal law, commercial law and worker compensation. He especially enjoyed criminal law because of the high-profile that it gave him both within the profession and the public. He was legal advisor to the export company run by Joe Walding. He also provided legal advice pro bono for many sporting organisations.

== Political career ==
=== Local politics ===
De Cleene joined the Labour Party in 1952. His family had a long connection with the party and his earliest memory of his mother was her pouring tea at Labour Party functions, always grateful of having obtained a State house to live in. He became more active in the 1960s.

De Cleene was first elected to Palmerston North City Council in 1962 and aged 29, he was the youngest councillor. However, party politics had no place in Palmerston and those who tried to represent one of the parties had always failed, so his Labour affiliation was no feature while standing for council. He was re-elected after the end of his first term in 1965, but was forced to resign a year later. He had taken the American singer P.J. Proby deer stalking and trespassed Crown land in the Tangimoana forest, for which he was fined £5; the Municipal Corporations Act 1908 required elected members committed of an offence that is punishable by imprisonment to resign. He successfully stood again at the next election in 1968 and was re-elected in 1971. In 1974, he stood both as a council candidate and for the mayoralty, opposing the incumbent Brian Elwood, with the new council office the main point of the campaign. Elwood was a proponent of the scheme, whilst de Cleene opposed it on financial grounds. Elwood achieved 58% of the vote, but de Cleene was elected as a councillor and served until 1976, when he moved away from Palmerston North.

De Cleene first stood for Parliament in the 1969 general election in the Pahiatua electorate against the Prime Minister, Keith Holyoake. The political novice had no chance to unseat the incumbent in the election, was aware of it and was not interested in entering Parliament at that point anyway: "I was too young and with a wife and kids. But it was good experience for the future." The electorate was contested by four candidates, and Holyoake and de Cleene obtained 62.3% and 28.3% of the votes, respectively.

In 1976, de Cleene moved to Tauranga for personal reasons. One biographer describes his as being restless during that period, trying to break his political links with his home town Palmerston North. He returned home to contest the 1978 election. His friend Joe Walding, who had previously represented the Palmerston North electorate and whom he had previously supported, was nominated for Palmerston North again. De Cleene won the Labour nomination for the Manawatu electorate. He came second in the general election against Michael Cox of the National Party.

=== Member of Parliament ===
New Zealand Parliament
Years	Term	Electorate	Party
1981–1984	40th	Palmerston North	Labour
1984–1987	41st	Palmerston North	Labour
1987–1990	42nd	Palmerston North	Labour

Walding had been successful again in the 1978 election, but had to announce his retirement from politics for health reasons prior to the 1981 election. De Cleene was the most experienced Labour candidate who put his name forward for selection, and despite concerns about his often controversial nature, he was nominated by the party. The candidate put forward by National was his old foe Brian Elwood, with whom he had worked on the Palmerston North City Council for many years, and against whom he lost the mayoralty contest in 1974. Elwood and de Cleene received 8315 and 10425 votes, respectively (representing 35.7% and 48.5%, respectively), with de Cleene thus entering Parliament in 1981. Helen Clark, the later Prime Minister, entered Parliament at the same time and the two became close friends. In 1983 he was appointed as Labour's spokesperson for Revenue and Friendly Societies by Labour leader David Lange.

De Cleene won the 1984 election, called early by Robert Muldoon, with an increased majority over National's candidate, Colleen Singleton. In the 1987 election, de Cleene raised his share of the vote to 56.2%, defeating National's Paul Curry. He did not seek re-election in the 1990 election.

=== Government minister ===
De Cleene was a supporter of Rogernomics, and in 1984 when the Fourth Labour Government was elected he was appointed undersecretary to Minister of Finance Roger Douglas with responsibility for the IRD. He became a minister outside cabinet in 1987, with Customs and Revenue portfolios. He memorably described the bulky Report of the Royal Commission on Social Policy chaired by Ivor Richardson as a useful doorstop.

He resigned from Cabinet in 1988 when Douglas was sacked by Lange. De Cleene, Douglas and Prebble were known as the Three Musketeers, and sat together in the remotest backbench seats. When de Cleene retired in 1990, he was replaced by Steve Maharey.

In 1990, de Cleene was awarded the New Zealand 1990 Medal, and in the 1991 New Year Honours he was appointed an Officer of the Order of the British Empire, for public services.

=== Post-parliamentary activity ===
After leaving Parliament, de Cleene initially resumed his legal practice. He then moved to Tauranga again. He left the Labour Party and became a founding member of ACT New Zealand in 1993. In 1996, he then joined the National Party so that he could support Katherine O'Regan with the attempted unseating of Winston Peters from the Tauranga electorate.

== Death ==
De Cleene died in Tauranga of cancer on 22 April 2001. He was survived by his second wife Raewyn and three adult children from his first marriage: Catherine, David and William. His death was announced to Parliament by his friend, Helen Clark, two days later. Clark said that:

Mr de Cleene would be remembered for his commitment to his beliefs along with his wit and irreverence. “Trevor was a marvellous parliamentary orator and held his own with the likes of David Lange and Sir Robert Muldoon. As a person Trevor lived life to the full. He grew up in a state house, went to university, worked as a lawyer, became an MP and a minister. He enjoyed many outside interests ranging from hunting and horse racing, to music and literature.”

While being political adversaries on opposite sides of the Parliamentary House, Muldoon was fond of him on a personal level.

== Notes ==
Political offices
Preceded by Roger Douglas	Minister of Revenue; 1987–1988	Succeeded by David Caygill
Preceded by Margaret Shields	Minister of Customs; 1987–1988	Succeeded by Margaret Shields
New Zealand Parliament
Preceded by Joe Walding	Member of Parliament for Palmerston North; 1981–1990	Succeeded by Steve Maharey
