= David Caygill =

New Zealand politician

The Honourable David Caygill CNZM
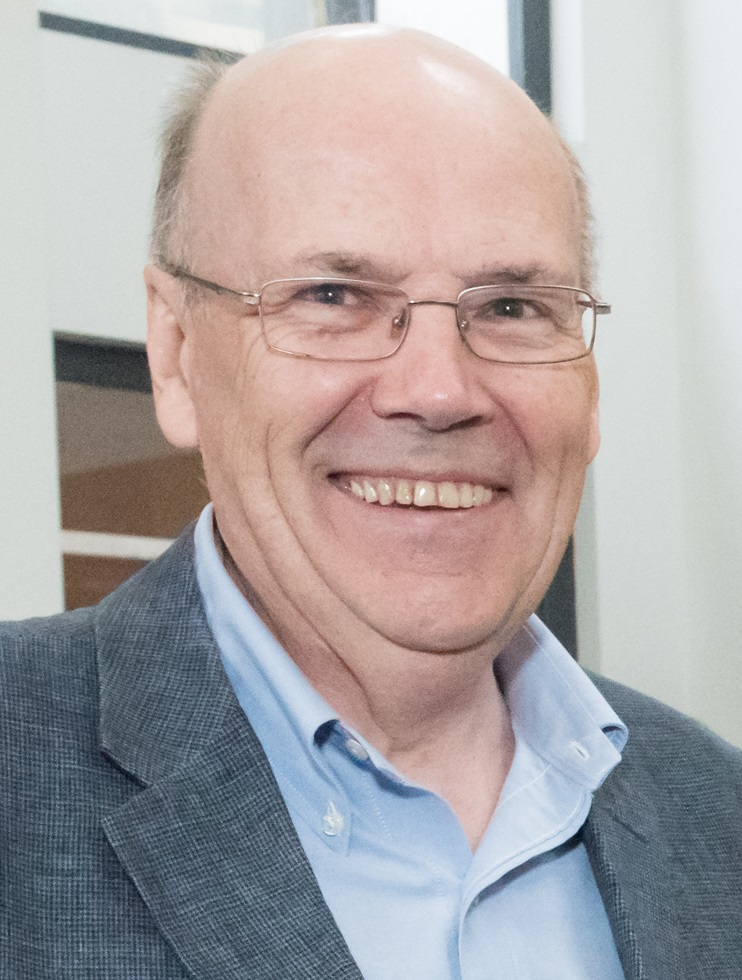
- Caygill in 2015

12th Deputy Leader of the Labour Party
- In office 1 December 1993 – 11 June 1996
- Leader: Helen Clark
- Preceded by: Helen Clark
- Succeeded by: Michael Cullen

36th Minister of Finance
- In office 14 December 1988 – 2 November 1990
- Prime Minister: David Lange; Geoffrey Palmer; Mike Moore
- Preceded by: Roger Douglas
- Succeeded by: Ruth Richardson

28th Minister of Health
- In office 24 August 1987 – 30 January 1989
- Prime Minister: David Lange
- Preceded by: Michael Bassett
- Succeeded by: Helen Clark

5th Minister of Trade and Industry
- In office 26 July 1984 – 7 September 1988
- Prime Minister: David Lange
- Preceded by: Hugh Templeton
- Succeeded by: David Butcher

Member of the New Zealand Parliament for St Albans
- In office 25 November 1978 – 12 October 1996
- Preceded by: Roger Drayton
- Succeeded by: Constituency abolished

Personal details
- Born: David Francis Caygill; 15 November 1948 (age 78) Christchurch, New Zealand
- Party: Labour
- Spouse: Eileen Ellen Boyd (after 1974)
- Children: 4

David Francis Caygill CNZM (born 15 November 1948) is a former New Zealand politician. He was born and raised in Christchurch. He entered politics in 1971 as Christchurch's youngest city councillor at the age of 22. He served as a Member of Parliament (MP) from 1978 to 1996, representing the Labour Party. During the Fourth Labour Government of New Zealand, Caygill was a member of the notorious 'Treasury Troika', championing the widespread deregulation of New Zealand's economy along with Roger Douglas (whom he succeeded as Finance Minister in 1988) and Richard Prebble. Unlike the latter two, who abandoned the Labour Party in order to form ACT New Zealand in 1994, Caygill continued to serve in the shadow cabinets of Helen Clark and Mike Moore, and remains a committed member of the Labour Party to this day.

From 2010 to 2019, he was one of the government-appointed commissioners at Environment Canterbury.

== Early life and family ==
Caygill was born in Christchurch on 15 November 1948, the son of Gwyneth Mary Caygill (née Harris) and Bruce Allot Caygill. He was educated at St Albans Primary School and Christchurch Boys' High School, and then studied at the University of Canterbury, graduating Bachelor of Arts in 1971 and Bachelor of Laws in 1974. In 1971 Caygill was President of the University of Canterbury Students' Association from 1975 to 1978.

In 1974, he married Eileen Ellen Boyd, and the couple went on to have four children. From 1975 to 1978 he practised law with a Christchurch legal firm.

== Political career ==
Caygill's early political philosophies were aligned with the National Party, which he joined as a schoolboy. He chaired the St Albans branch of the Young Nationals from age 20. His allegiance switched to Labour in part due to its stance against the Vietnam War, which he also opposed.

=== Local-body politics ===
Upon the urging of Neville Pickering, Caygill successfully ran for the Christchurch City Council in 1971, and served until 1980. On 29 April 1974, he became the city's youngest ever acting Mayor for a period of five days. He was chair of the council's staff and community services committee.

From 1977 to 1980 he was a member of the Canterbury Regional Planning Authority and was chairman of the Authority's air pollution committee. He was also a council member of Christchurch Polytechnic.

=== Member of Parliament ===
New Zealand Parliament
Years	Term	Electorate	Party
1978–1981	39th	St Albans	Labour
1981–1984	40th	St Albans	Labour
1984–1987	41st	St Albans	Labour
1987–1990	42nd	St Albans	Labour
1990–1993	43rd	St Albans	Labour
1993–1996	44th	St Albans	Labour

Caygill was first elected to Parliament at the 1978 general election as MP for the Christchurch electorate of St Albans. He served for six terms. Caygill was described as one of the most energetic new members elected at the 1978 election. Just under a year later in a reshuffle in October 1979 Caygill was promoted by Labour leader Bill Rowling and given the economic development portfolio.

In March 1981 he had his responsibilities switched and was instead appointed Shadow Minister of Local Government. His duties changed again in February 1982 and he became Shadow Minister of Energy. When David Lange replaced Rowling leader he appointed Caygill as Shadow Minister of Trade and Industry in March 1983.

==== Lange Ministry (1984–1989) ====
When the Fourth Labour Government was formed after the 1984 elections, Caygill aligned himself with Roger Douglas the controversial Minister of Finance. Douglas, Caygill, and Richard Prebble were together dubbed "the Treasury Troika", and were responsible for most of the economic reform undertaken by the Labour government. The "Rogernomics" reforms, which were based on free market economic theory, were unpopular with many traditional Labour supporters. Perceived by most as the most moderate member of the Troika, Caygill managed to avoid the worst of the condemnation directed towards Douglas and Prebble.

He was appointed by the new prime minister, David Lange, as minister of trade and industry, and Minister of National Development, on 26 July 1984.

The government opened up and liberalised the New Zealand economy and Caygill's portfolios were heavily affected. In early 1986 import controls were lifted on 340 products and relaxed on many others, removing the restrictions on the value or quantity of these goods which may be imported. Following the release of a 1987 report from a working group on tariffs, Caygill announced that tariffs on goods not subject to industry plans would be reduced in a five-step programme over four years. New Zealand had been a highly protected economy but transitioned to a lower tariff environment with reduced protectionism. In 1987, after Labour had been re-elected, he was appointed Minister of Health. As health minister he rejected the orthodoxy of the Gibbs report, which sought to create a more competition oriented hospital service. For this, he gained favour among the Labour Party's left-wing.

==== Minister of Finance (1988–1990) ====
When Douglas was fired by Prime Minister Lange, Caygill was appointed Minister of Finance in his place. After Lange himself had resigned, Caygill retained his position under both Geoffrey Palmer and Mike Moore, Lange's short-lived successors as prime minister. As finance minister he passed the "inflation busting" Reserve Bank Act. He also became Minister of Revenue, but dropped the health portfolio. His approach to the finance role was less confrontational and radical than his predecessor, with one Labour MP saying "We approve much more of what David Caygill wants than we would have with Roger Douglas, because he doesn’t bully us and tell us the economy's going to fall apart if we don't do it."

Seeking to tackle the sizeable budget deficit while increase spending on social services, Caygill's 1989 budget included various increases to tax rates and reductions in the size of the defence budget. Along with this, it increased spending on various preschool education and social housing programs, satiating the Prime Minister's desire to have enacted a "social agenda" as Prime Minister. Spending on health and education was further increased in the 1990 budget, along with a proposed 5-year phase out of tariff protection and a further reduction in defence spending.

When Lange resigned as prime minister in 1989, Caygill ruled out standing for prime minister, saying it was "an appalling job" and that he was enjoying his current role as finance minister.

Caygill was a reluctant supporter of the Government's privatisation programme, particularly selling the Bank of New Zealand. Thinking privatisation a political liability, he remained committed to it believing it necessary to pay back $14 billion of public debt. In his last budget as Minister of Finance in 1990, Caygill lifted the quarantining of rental losses on investment property, allowing an investor to offset losses on their investment property against their other taxable income. Caygill was described as a consummate back-room politician; "Calm, utterly discreet, yet equally forceful, he [Caygill] is said to have people march angrily into his room then leave it an hour later smiling — even if they have lost the argument."

==== Opposition (1990–1996) ====
After the defeat of the Fourth Labour Government in November 1990 Caygill became Shadow Minister of Finance. In December 1991 Caygill was replaced as finance spokesperson by Michael Cullen, who was more progressive in his economic policies. Caygill continued to hold a senior position in the Labour Party and was instead appointed Shadow Minister of Justice and Energy.

After Labour's narrow defeat at the 1993 election, Helen Clark won the leadership of the party. At the same time Caygill replaced her as deputy leader defeating Cullen by the narrow margin of 23 votes to 21. He cited Sir Geoffrey Palmer as a role model for his deputy leadership. Under Clark he was Deputy Leader of the Opposition as well as Shadow Attorney-General.

Following Clark's ascension to the party leadership, Labour felt obligated to clarify its basic position on New Zealands' political spectrum in the post-Rogernomics era. Although the economic reforms of the Fourth Labour government were controversial with the party's membership, many members of the Labour caucus felt uneasy about the party completely dissociating itself with Rogernomics. In this context Caygill's appointment as Deputy Leader worked to reassure moderates that a Clark premiership would not entail a radical shift to the left. Nevertheless, almost all members of the party's parliamentary caucus wanted Labour to be a centre-left party, with the exceptions of former leader Mike Moore who openly maintained that the party should be positioned at the centre and not the centre-left and Peter Dunne, who rejected any increases to taxation or social spending and eagerly self-identified as centre-right.

Clark rejected Moore's assertion that Labour should position itself as anything other than a social democratic alternative to the Nationals, on the grounds that a Centre Party would be incapable of holding anything other than the balance of power for one party or another and could not win government as a result. Caygill reiterated this in 1993 stating that "the fruits of a stronger economy cannot be allowed to fall simply where the implacable market determines or New Zealand will become a very unpleasant and un-New Zealand place to be".

In June 1995 after Labour MP Margaret Austin defected from Labour to form a new party, United New Zealand, Caygill replaced her as Shadow Minister of Education. He supported Clark during an attempt to oust her as leader in favour of frontbencher Phil Goff in the lead up to the 1996 election.

Over the course of the parliamentary term Caygill had been privately contemplating retiring from politics. On 7 June he informed Clark that he had decided to stand down at the election. Caygill announced his retirement on 11 June 1996 to a surprised caucus, after which Cullen was elected as his successor as deputy leader unopposed. He said there had been no pressure on him to quit but hoped it would provide the "circuit-breaker" to Labour's troubles. At the 1996 election, Caygill retired from Parliament. In an interview that year, Caygill described his own ideology in saying "you don't want a strong economy for the sake of the kudos that the country might get, though there are some benefits in that. You want it because of the advantage that a strong economy can confer in terms of not just higher living standards but more equal living standards. There is, in my view, a distributive responsibility in government."

== Life after politics ==
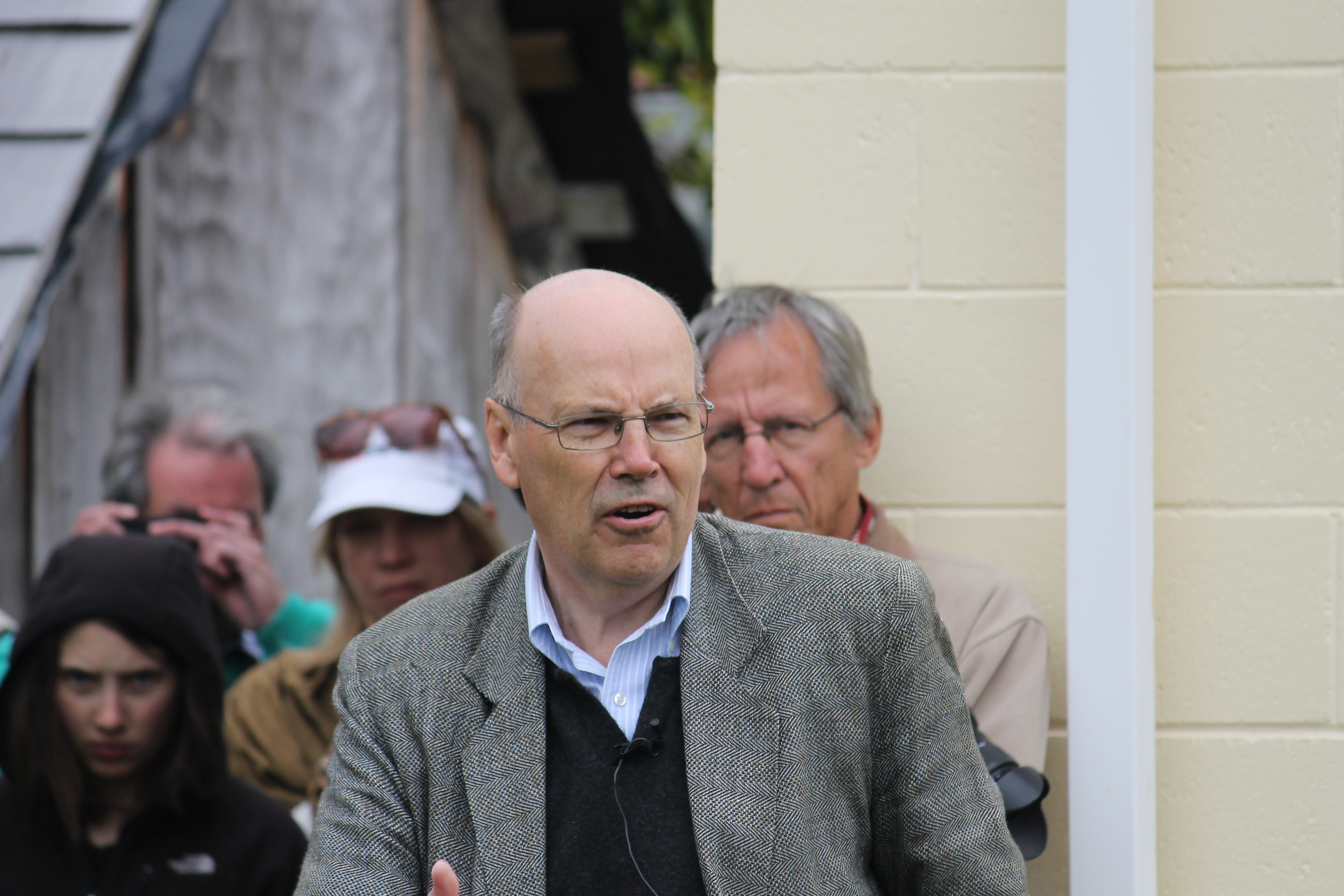
Caygill speaking to dignitaries on Waitangi Day 2013 at the Okains Bay Museum

After leaving politics, Caygill returned to his original occupation, law. For some time, he was a partner at Buddle Findlay, a prominent law firm. He also worked for a number of government bodies, and was chair of the Accident Compensation Corporation. He chaired a ministerial inquiry into the New Zealand electricity market in 2000, and was appointed chairman of the Electricity Commission in 2007. He is a board member of the Energy Efficiency and Conservation Authority. He is the chair of the Education New Zealand Trust.

From 2010 to 2019, Caygill was one of the commissioners at Environment Canterbury appointed by the National Government. He held the role of deputy chair. Caygill was appointed, in December 2010, as the Chair of the 2011 NZ ETS Review Panel.

== Honours and awards ==
In 1990, Caygill was awarded the New Zealand 1990 Commemoration Medal. In the 1997 New Year Honours, he was appointed a Companion of the New Zealand Order of Merit, for public services. He was conferred an honorary Doctor of Commerce degree by Victoria University of Wellington in 2004.

== Notes ==
New Zealand Parliament
Preceded by Roger Drayton	Member of Parliament for St Albans; 1978–1996	Constituency abolished
Political offices
Preceded by Hugh Templeton	Minister of Trade and Industry; 1984–1988	Succeeded by David Butcher
Preceded by Michael Bassett	Minister of Health; 1987–1989	Succeeded by Helen Clark
Preceded by Trevor de Cleene	Minister of Revenue; 1988–1990	Succeeded by Peter Neilson
Preceded by Roger Douglas	Minister of Finance; 1988–1990	Succeeded by Ruth Richardson
Party political offices
Preceded by Helen Clark	Deputy Leader of the Labour Party; 1993–1996	Succeeded by Michael Cullen
