= Hugh Templeton =

New Zealand politician

The Honourable Hugh Templeton QSO AO
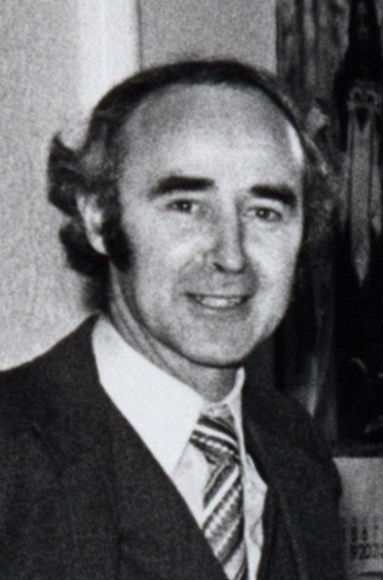
- Templeton in 1981

4th Minister of Trade and Industry
- In office 11 December 1981 – 26 July 1984
- Prime Minister: Robert Muldoon
- Preceded by: Lance Adams-Schneider
- Succeeded by: David Caygill

47th Minister of Customs
- In office 13 December 1978 – 15 June 1982
- Prime Minister: Robert Muldoon
- Preceded by: Peter Wilkinson
- Succeeded by: Keith Allen

44th Postmaster-General
- In office 12 December 1975 – 8 March 1977
- Prime Minister: Robert Muldoon
- Preceded by: Fraser Colman
- Succeeded by: Peter Wilkinson

13th Minister of Broadcasting
- In office 12 December 1975 – 12 February 1981
- Prime Minister: Robert Muldoon
- Preceded by: Roger Douglas
- Succeeded by: Warren Cooper

Member of the New Zealand Parliament for Ohariu Karori (1975–1978)
- In office 29 November 1975 – 14 July 1984
- Preceded by: Jack Marshall
- Succeeded by: Peter Dunne

Member of the New Zealand Parliament for Awarua
- In office 29 November 1969 – 25 November 1972
- Preceded by: Gordon Grieve
- Succeeded by: Aubrey Begg

Personal details
- Born: 24 March 1929 (age 97) Wyndham, New Zealand
- Party: National
- Spouse: Natasha Templeton

Hugh Campbell Templeton QSO AO (born 24 March 1929) is a former New Zealand diplomat, politician and member of parliament for the National Party.

== Early life and family ==
Templeton was born in Wyndham, Southland, in 1929. He was educated at Gore High School, King's High School, the University of Otago, and then as a Rhodes Scholar at Balliol College, Oxford University in 1952–53. He married Russian-born New Zealand novelist Natasha Templeton in Wellington in 1961.

His brother, Malcolm, was a Foreign Service officer who represented New Zealand at the United Nations. His twin brother Ian is a veteran press gallery journalist and author.

From 1954 to 1969 Templeton served with the New Zealand Department of External Affairs, first in London, and then in Wellington, before going as the last Deputy High Commissioner of Western Samoa to prepare specially for independence and then to New York to assist secure Samoa's post independence aid programmes, under Guy Powles. From 1965 to 1969 Templeton served in Wellington working on Asian and European and Defence affairs, before being elected to Parliament.

== Member of Parliament ==
New Zealand Parliament
Years	Term	Electorate	Party
1969–1972	36th	Awarua	National
1975–1978	38th	Karori	National
1978–1981	39th	Ohariu	National
1981–1984	40th	Ohariu	National

Templeton was elected as MP for Awarua in Southland in 1969. However, he lost the electorate in the 1972 election to Labour's Aubrey Begg. He was one of four National Party incumbents from Otago and Southland who lost their normally blue electorate to the Labour challenger over the proposed raising of the lake levels of lakes Manapouri and Te Anau, which was opposed by the Save Manapouri campaign. Labour's election manifesto was for the lakes to remain at their natural levels.

From 1972 to 1975, after losing his parliamentary seat, he was executive assistant to the Leaders of the Opposition (first Jack Marshall and then Robert Muldoon). Despite no longer being a Member of Parliament Templeton continued as the secretary of the National caucus. Templeton was re-elected to Parliament in 1975 for the Wellington electorate of Karori. The electorate was renamed Ohariu and was represented by Templeton until the 1984 election when he was defeated by Peter Dunne, then a member of the Labour Party, in a three-way contest with the New Zealand Party's leader Bob Jones. His friend and diplomatic colleague Chris Beeby commented on Templeton's election losses "It must take a very special kind of talent to fuck up two blue-ribbon seats." In contrast, former attorney-general Chris Finlayson said that Templeton was "...a fine MP and Minister, whose contribution to this country has never been properly recognised."

=== Cabinet minister ===
Templeton was appointed to various positions in communications and economic portfolios during the Muldoon National Government of 1975–1984. Templeton was Minister of Revenue (1977–1982) and Minister of Trade and Industry (1981–1984) with responsibility for ANZCER (Australia – New Zealand Closer Economic Relations free trade agreement). Templeton also worked with the Prime Minister on stimulating New Zealand's onshore petroleum programme as part of Think Big. He wrote a book All Honourable Men: Inside the Muldoon Cabinet 1975–1984 on this period.

In the 1992 New Year Honours, Templeton was appointed a Companion of the Queen's Service Order for public services.

== Post parliamentary career ==
=== New Zealand Flag ===
In 2004, Templeton supported the NZ Flag.com Trust campaign for a referendum to change New Zealand's flag. A petition for a referendum on the issue failed to gain enough signatures.

=== Australian honour ===
In November 2009, he was appointed an Honorary Officer of the Order of Australia, "for service to Australia-New Zealand economic relations, particularly through the establishment of the Australia-New Zealand Closer Economic Relations Trade Agreement".

== Works by Templeton ==
- All Honourable Men: Inside the Muldoon Cabinet 1975–1984 (1995, Auckland University Press, Auckland) ISBN 1-86940-128-X
- Templeton, Hugh. "Algie, Ronald Macmillan 1888–1978". Dictionary of New Zealand Biography. Ministry for Culture and Heritage.
- Templeton, Hugh. "Shand, Thomas Philip 1911–1969". Dictionary of New Zealand Biography. Ministry for Culture and Heritage.
- Templeton, Hugh. "Sullivan, William 1891–1967". Dictionary of New Zealand Biography. Ministry for Culture and Heritage.
- Templeton, Hugh. "Webb, Thomas Clifton 1889–1962". Dictionary of New Zealand Biography. Ministry for Culture and Heritage.

Political offices
Preceded by Fraser Colman	Postmaster-General; 1975–1977	Succeeded by Peter Wilkinson
Preceded by Roger Douglas	Minister of Broadcasting; 1975–1981	Succeeded by Warren Cooper
Preceded by Peter Wilkinson	Minister of Customs; 1978–1982	Succeeded by Keith Allen
Preceded by Lance Adams-Schneider	Minister of Trade and Industry; 1981–1984	Succeeded by David Caygill
New Zealand Parliament
Preceded by Gordon Grieve	Member of Parliament for Awarua; 1969–1972	Succeeded by Aubrey Begg
Preceded by Jack Marshall	Member of Parliament for Karori; 1975–1978	Constituency abolished
