= Peter Wilkinson (politician) =

New Zealand politician (1934–1987)

New Zealand Parliament
Years	Term	Electorate	Party
1969–1972	36th	Rodney	National
1972–1975	37th	Rodney	National
1975–1978	38th	Rodney	National
1978–1981	39th	Kaipara	National
1981–1984	40th	Kaipara	National

Peter Ian Wilkinson (12 November 1934 – 19 October 1987) was a New Zealand politician of the National Party.

Wilkinson was born in Hexham, Northumberland, England, in 1934, the son of Rev G. L. B. Wilkinson. He received his education at schools in the Waikato and Auckland, at Durham University in England (from where he obtained a Bachelor of Arts with honours), and at the University of Auckland (from where he obtained a Bachelor of Laws).

He represented the Rodney electorate in Parliament from 1969 to 1978, having unsuccessfully stood for National in the Waitakere electorate in the 1966 election. He then represented the Kaipara electorate from 1978 to 1984, when he retired. In the 1978 election, Nevern McConachy of the Social Credit Party came within 520 votes of winning the electorate, the best chance that Social Credit had that election for gaining another representative; at the time, only Bruce Beetham was in Parliament for Social Credit. Wilkinson was succeeded in the Kaipara electorate by Lockwood Smith. Wilkinson was a Cabinet Minister, and held the position of Attorney-General in the Third National Government.

He was a half-brother of former Deputy Prime Minister Sir Jim McLay who succeeded him as the Attorney-General.

He died in Auckland Hospital of a brain haemorrhage, aged 52 years. The Wilkinson Trophy road running race has been held annually at Kaipara. First awarded in 1973 by Wilkinson, his widow continues to financially support the race.

== Notes ==
Political offices
Preceded by Martyn Finlay	Attorney-General; 1975–1978	Succeeded by Jim McLay
Preceded by Hugh Templeton	Postmaster-General; 1977–1978	Succeeded by Ben Couch
New Zealand Parliament
Preceded by Jack Scott	Member of Parliament for Rodney; 1969–1978	Vacant Constituency abolished, recreated in 1984 Title next held by Don McKinnon
Vacant Constituency recreated after abolition in 1946 Title last held by Clifton Webb	Member of Parliament for Kaipara; 1978–1984	Succeeded by Lockwood Smith
