= Minister of Customs (New Zealand) =

New Zealand minister of the Crown

- Coat of arms of New Zealand

- Flag of New Zealand

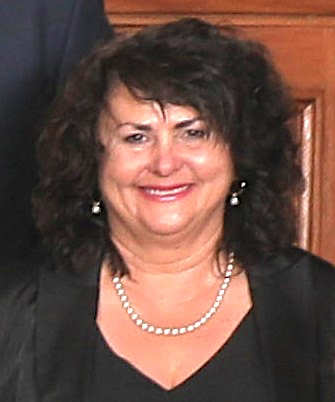
- Incumbent; Casey Costello since 27 November 2023
- New Zealand Customs Service
- Style: The Honourable
- Member of: Cabinet of New Zealand; Executive Council
- Reports to: Prime Minister of New Zealand
- Appointer: Governor-General of New Zealand
- Term length: At His Majesty's pleasure
- Formation: 1 January 1859
- First holder: William Richmond
- Salary: $288,900
- Website: www.beehive.govt.nz

The minister of customs is a minister in the New Zealand Government appointed by the Prime Minister to be in charge of matters of border control, international trade and travel and the collection of import duties and taxes to New Zealand. The minister is responsible for the New Zealand Customs Service which is the oldest government department in New Zealand.

The present minister is Casey Costello.

== List of ministers ==
The following ministers have held the office of minister of customs.

Key

Independent Liberal Reform United Labour National NZ First Alliance

No.	Name	Portrait	Term of Office		Prime Minister
1	William Richmond		1 January 1859	25 February 1859	Stafford
2	Henry Sewell		25 February 1859	26 April 1859	Stafford
(1)	William Richmond		26 April 1859	12 July 1861	Stafford
3	Reader Wood		12 July 1861	6 August 1862	Fox
4	Dillon Bell		6 August 1862	21 August 1862	Domett
(3)	Reader Wood		21 August 1862	24 November 1864	Domett
(3)	Reader Wood		21 August 1862	24 November 1864	Whitaker
5	William Fitzherbert		24 November 1864	3 April 1865	Weld
6	John Richardson		3 April 1865	16 October 1865	Weld
7	James Crowe Richmond		24 August 1866	28 June 1869	Stafford
8	Julius Vogel		28 June 1869	8 January 1871	Fox
(2)	Henry Sewell		8 January 1871	30 October 1871	Fox
(8)	Julius Vogel		30 October 1871	10 September 1872	Fox
9	Oswald Curtis		10 September 1872	11 October 1872	Stafford
10	John Bathgate		11 October 1872	26 October 1872	Waterhouse
11	William Reynolds		26 October 1872	15 February 1876	Waterhouse
11	William Reynolds		26 October 1872	15 February 1876	Fox
11	William Reynolds		26 October 1872	15 February 1876	Vogel
11	William Reynolds		26 October 1872	15 February 1876	Pollen
12	Harry Atkinson		15 February 1876	3 July 1876	Vogel
13	George McLean		4 July 1876	13 October 1877	Vogel
13	George McLean		4 July 1876	13 October 1877	Atkinson
14	George Grey		15 October 1877	12 January 1878	Grey
15	John Ballance		12 January 1878	12 July 1878	Grey
(14)	George Grey		12 July 1878	8 October 1879	Grey
(12)	Harry Atkinson		8 October 1879	10 March 1881	Hall
16	John Hall		10 March 1881	21 April 1882	Hall
(12)	Harry Atkinson		21 April 1882	16 August 1884	Whitaker
(12)	Harry Atkinson		21 April 1882	16 August 1884	Atkinson
17	George Morris		19 August 1884	28 August 1884	Stout
(13)	George McLean		28 August 1884	3 September 1884	Atkinson
(8)	Julius Vogel		3 September 1884	8 October 1887	Stout
18	George Fisher		8 October 1887	8 April 1889	Atkinson
(12)	Harry Atkinson		8 April 1889	24 January 1891	Atkinson
(15)	John Ballance		24 January 1891	27 April 1893†	Ballance
19	Joseph Ward		1 May 1893	16 June 1896	Seddon
20	Richard Seddon		16 June 1896	29 October 1900	Seddon
21	Charlie Mills		29 October 1900	6 August 1906	Seddon
21	Charlie Mills		29 October 1900	6 August 1906	Hall-Jones
22	John A. Millar		6 August 1906	6 January 1909	Ward
23	Alexander Hogg		6 January 1909	17 June 1909	Ward
24	George Fowlds		17 June 1909	4 September 1911	Ward
25	Roderick McKenzie		4 September 1911	28 March 1912	Ward
26	George Laurenson		28 March 1912	10 July 1912	Mackenzie
27	Francis Fisher		10 July 1912	7 January 1915	Massey
28	William Herries		19 February 1915	12 August 1915	Massey
29	Arthur Myers		12 August 1915	22 August 1919	Massey
(28)	William Herries		4 September 1919	7 February 1921	Massey
30	William Downie Stewart Jr		9 March 1921	10 December 1928	Massey
30	William Downie Stewart Jr		9 March 1921	10 December 1928	Bell
30	William Downie Stewart Jr		9 March 1921	10 December 1928	Coates
31	William Taverner		10 December 1928	20 December 1929	Ward
32	James Donald		20 December 1929	28 May 1930	Ward
33	George Forbes		28 May 1930	22 September 1931	Forbes
(30)	William Downie Stewart Jr		22 September 1931	28 January 1933	Forbes
34	Gordon Coates		28 January 1933	6 December 1935	Forbes
35	Walter Nash		6 December 1935	11 October 1936	Savage
-	Mark Fagan; Acting Minister		11 October 1936	16 August 1937	Savage
(35)	Walter Nash		16 August 1937	13 December 1949	Savage
(35)	Walter Nash		16 August 1937	13 December 1949	Fraser
36	Charles Bowden		13 December 1949	26 November 1954	Holland
37	Dean Eyre		26 November 1954	23 March 1956	Holland
38	Eric Halstead		23 March 1956	12 December 1957	Holland
38	Eric Halstead		23 March 1956	12 December 1957	Holyoake
39	Ray Boord		12 December 1957	12 December 1960	Nash
40	Jack Marshall		12 December 1960	24 January 1962	Holyoake
41	Norman Shelton		24 January 1962	12 December 1969	Holyoake
42	Lance Adams-Schneider		12 December 1969	9 February 1972	Holyoake
43	George Gair		9 February 1972	8 December 1972	Marshall
44	Mick Connelly		8 December 1972	13 March 1975	Kirk
44	Mick Connelly		8 December 1972	13 March 1975	Rowling
45	Roger Douglas		13 March 1975	12 December 1975	Rowling
46	Peter Wilkinson		12 December 1975	13 December 1978	Muldoon
47	Hugh Templeton		13 December 1978	15 June 1982	Muldoon
48	Keith Allen		15 June 1982	26 July 1984	Muldoon
49	Margaret Shields		26 July 1984	24 August 1987	Lange
50	Trevor de Cleene		24 August 1987	14 December 1988	Lange
(49)	Margaret Shields		14 December 1988	8 August 1989	Lange
51	Peter Neilson		8 August 1989	2 November 1990	Palmer
51	Peter Neilson		8 August 1989	2 November 1990	Moore
52	Wyatt Creech		2 November 1990	1 July 1993	Bolger
53	Murray McCully		1 July 1993	16 December 1996	Bolger
54	Neil Kirton		16 December 1996	12 September 1997	Bolger
55	Tuariki Delamere		12 September 1997	31 August 1998	Bolger
55	Tuariki Delamere		12 September 1997	31 August 1998	Shipley
56	John Luxton		31 August 1998	10 December 1999	Shipley
57	Phillida Bunkle		10 December 1999	23 February 2001	Clark
-	Jim Anderton; Acting Minister		23 February 2001	15 August 2002	Clark
58	Rick Barker		15 August 2002	19 October 2005	Clark
59	Nanaia Mahuta		19 October 2005	19 November 2008	Clark
60	Maurice Williamson		19 November 2008	1 May 2014	Key
61	Nicky Wagner		7 May 2014	2 May 2017	Key
61	Nicky Wagner		7 May 2014	2 May 2017	English
62	Tim Macindoe		2 May 2017	26 October 2017	English
63	Meka Whaitiri		26 October 2017	30 August 2018	Ardern
64	Kris Faafoi		30 August 2018	27 June 2019	Ardern
65	Jenny Salesa		27 June 2019	6 November 2020	Ardern
(63)	Meka Whaitiri		6 November 2020	3 May 2023	Ardern
(63)	Meka Whaitiri		6 November 2020	3 May 2023	Hipkins
-	Damien O'Connor; Acting Minister		3 May 2023	8 May 2023	Hipkins
66	Jo Luxton		8 May 2023	27 November 2023	Hipkins
67	Casey Costello		27 November 2023	present	Luxon
