= Minister of Trade and Industry (New Zealand) =

New Zealand minister of the Crown

The minister of trade and industry in New Zealand is a former cabinet position (existing from 1972 to 1989) appointed by the prime minister to be in charge of matters of industrial and commercial growth and trade. In 1972 it was created, superseding the precious office of minister of industries and commerce, but was distinct from the separate post of minister of overseas trade. In 1989 the Trade and Industry portfolio was absorbed by the minister of commerce.

== List of ministers ==
The following ministers held the office of minister of trade and industry.

Key

National Labour

No.	Name	Portrait	Term of Office		Prime Minister
1	Brian Talboys		24 October 1972	8 December 1972	Marshall
2	Warren Freer		8 December 1972	12 December 1975	Kirk
2	Warren Freer		8 December 1972	12 December 1975	Rowling
3	Lance Adams-Schneider		12 December 1975	11 December 1981	Muldoon
4	Hugh Templeton		11 December 1981	26 July 1984	Muldoon
5	David Caygill		26 July 1984	10 October 1988	Lange
6	David Butcher		10 October 1988	11 July 1989	Lange
