= Yaldhurst (electorate) =

Former New Zealand electorate

Yaldhurst is a former New Zealand parliamentary electorate, near the city of Christchurch. The electorate was to the southwest of Christchurch, and was suburban and semi-rural.

== Population centres ==
The 1977 electoral redistribution was the most overtly political since the Representation Commission had been established through an amendment to the Representation Act in 1886, initiated by Muldoon's National Government. As part of the 1976 census, a large number of people failed to fill out an electoral re-registration card, and census staff had not been given the authority to insist on the card being completed. This had little practical effect for people on the general roll, but it transferred Māori to the general roll if the card was not handed in. Together with a northward shift of New Zealand's population, this resulted in five new electorates having to be created in the upper part of the North Island. The electoral redistribution was very disruptive, and 22 electorates were abolished, while 27 electorates were newly created (including Yaldhurst) or re-established. These changes came into effect for the 1978 election.

The Wigram electorate was abolished through the 1977 electoral redistribution and its northern part made up much of the area of the new Yaldhurst electorate. A much smaller areas were gained by Yaldhurst from the Riccarton and Rangiora electorates. Christchurch suburbs located in the Yaldhurst electorate included Burnside, Avonhead, Russley, Broomfield, Hei Hei, Yaldhurst, and parts of Hornby.

== History ==
In the 1978 election, the Yaldhurst electorate was won by Mick Connelly of the Labour Party, who had been MP for the Wigram electorate since 1969, and the Riccarton electorate prior to that since 1956. Connelly retired at the 1984 election and was succeeded by Labour's Margaret Austin. In 1995, Austin defected to United New Zealand prior to the first mixed-member proportional (MMP) election. When the electorate was abolished in 1996, Austin stood in the new Ilam electorate where she came third.

=== Members of Parliament ===
Key

Labour United NZ

| Election | Winner |
|---|---|
| 1978 election | Mick Connelly |
| 1981 election | Mick Connelly |
| 1984 election | Margaret Austin |
| 1987 election | Margaret Austin |
| 1990 election | Margaret Austin |
| 1993 election | Margaret Austin |
(Electorate abolished in 1996; see Ilam)

== Election results ==
=== 1993 election ===
1993 general election: Yaldhurst
| Party | Candidate | Votes | % | ±% |
|---|---|---|---|---|
| Labour | Margaret Austin | 10,659 | 46.72 | −2.90 |
| National | David Watson | 7,662 | 33.58 | |
| Alliance | Liz Gordon | 2,881 | 12.62 | |
| NZ First | Robin Booth | 1,092 | 4.78 | |
| Christian Heritage | Graham Capill | 467 | 2.04 | |
| Natural Law | Royal Van Der Werf | 53 | 0.23 | |
| Majority | | 2,997 | 13.13 | +12.95 |
| Turnout | | 22,814 | 85.80 | −0.22 |
| Registered electors | | 26,588 | | |

=== 1990 election ===
1990 general election: Yaldhurst
| Party | Candidate | Votes | % | ±% |
|---|---|---|---|---|
| Labour | Margaret Austin | 9,699 | 43.82 | −10.61 |
| National | John Connelly | 9,657 | 43.63 | |
| NewLabour | Garry Illes | 1,595 | 7.20 | |
| Christian Heritage | Gary Milne | 563 | 2.54 | |
| Independent | Henry Collett | 381 | 1.72 | |
| Democrats | Norman Davey | 151 | 0.68 | −1.84 |
| Social Credit | Vince Smith | 85 | 0.38 | |
| Majority | | 42 | 0.18 | −11.66 |
| Turnout | | 22,131 | 86.02 | −3.41 |
| Registered electors | | 25,726 | | |

=== 1987 election ===
1987 general election: Yaldhurst
| Party | Candidate | Votes | % | ±% |
|---|---|---|---|---|
| Labour | Margaret Austin | 11,684 | 54.43 | +4.06 |
| National | James Bacon | 9,142 | 42.59 | |
| Democrats | Norman Davey | 542 | 2.52 | −0.08 |
| Wizard Party | Suzanne Toy | 97 | 0.45 | |
| Majority | | 2,542 | 11.84 | −1.10 |
| Turnout | | 21,465 | 89.43 | −5.00 |
| Registered electors | | 24,001 | | |

=== 1984 election ===
1984 general election: Yaldhurst
| Party | Candidate | Votes | % | ±% |
|---|---|---|---|---|
| Labour | Margaret Austin | 11,560 | 50.37 | |
| National | Howard Joseph | 8,590 | 37.43 | |
| NZ Party | Neil Russell | 2,024 | 8.82 | |
| Social Credit | Norman Davey | 597 | 2.60 | −6.84 |
| Values | Alan Wilkinson | 99 | 0.43 | −0.09 |
| Independent | Geoff Bucknall | 76 | 0.33 | −0.03 |
| Majority | | 2,970 | 12.94 | |
| Turnout | | 22,946 | 94.43 | +3.22 |
| Registered electors | | 24,298 | | |

=== 1981 election ===
1981 general election: Yaldhurst
| Party | Candidate | Votes | % | ±% |
|---|---|---|---|---|
| Labour | Mick Connelly | 10,975 | 49.23 | −1.02 |
| National | Margaret Murray | 9,013 | 40.43 | |
| Social Credit | Norman Davey | 2,106 | 9.44 | +1.69 |
| Values | Alan Wilkinson | 117 | 0.52 | |
| Independent | Geoff Bucknall | 81 | 0.36 | |
| Majority | | 1,962 | 8.80 | +1.19 |
| Turnout | | 22,292 | 91.21 | +16.15 |
| Registered electors | | 24,440 | | |

=== 1978 election ===
1978 general election: Yaldhurst
| Party | Candidate | Votes | % | ±% |
|---|---|---|---|---|
| Labour | Mick Connelly | 10,816 | 50.25 | |
| National | David Watson | 8,548 | 39.71 | |
| Social Credit | Norman Davey | 1,670 | 7.75 | |
| Values | Pat Wilkinson | 487 | 2.26 | |
| Majority | | 1,638 | 7.61 | |
| Turnout | | 21,521 | 75.06 | |
| Registered electors | | 28,670 | | |
