= Islington, New Zealand =

Suburb of Christchurch, New Zealand

Islington
- Suburb
- Interactive map of Islington
- Coordinates: 43.541°S 172.509°E
- Country: New Zealand
- City: Christchurch
- Local authority: Christchurch City Council
- Electoral ward: Hornby
- Community board: Waipuna Halswell-Hornby-Riccarton

Area
  - Land: 178 ha (440 acres)

Population (June 2025)
  - Total: 1,040
  - Density: 584/km^{2} (1,510/sq mi)

	Yaldhurst	Broomfield
Paparua	Islington	Hei Hei
Templeton		Hornby

Islington is a suburb on the western side of Christchurch city.

The suburb is named after the London borough of Islington, perhaps because the borough had a market for cattle, while the Christchurch area had a freezing works opened in 1889.

State Highway 1 and the Main South Line run past the southern side of Islington. The suburb is home to a major electrical substation, which is also home to the main operations centre for the South Island's electrical grid.

== Demographics ==
Islington covers 1.78 km^{2} (0.69 sq mi). It had an estimated population of 1,040 as of June 2025, with a population density of 584 people per km^{2}.

Historical population
Year	Pop.	±% p.a.
2006	810	—
2013	906	+1.61%
2018	969	+1.35%
2023	960	−0.19%

Islington had a population of 960 in the 2023 New Zealand census, a decrease of 9 people (−0.9%) since the 2018 census, and an increase of 54 people (6.0%) since the 2013 census. There were 492 males, 465 females, and 3 people of other genders in 369 dwellings. 2.8% of people identified as LGBTIQ+. The median age was 37.8 years (compared with 38.1 years nationally). There were 144 people (15.0%) aged under 15 years, 225 (23.4%) aged 15 to 29, 447 (46.6%) aged 30 to 64, and 144 (15.0%) aged 65 or older.

People could identify as more than one ethnicity. The results were 69.4% European (Pākehā); 17.5% Māori; 8.8% Pasifika; 17.5% Asian; 0.9% Middle Eastern, Latin American and African New Zealanders (MELAA); and 1.2% other, which includes people giving their ethnicity as "New Zealander". English was spoken by 96.9%, Māori by 4.1%, Samoan by 2.8%, and other languages by 12.8%. No language could be spoken by 1.9% (e.g. too young to talk). New Zealand Sign Language was known by 0.6%. The percentage of people born overseas was 23.4, compared with 28.8% nationally.

Religious affiliations were 34.7% Christian, 2.2% Hindu, 0.6% Islam, 1.6% Māori religious beliefs, 0.3% Buddhist, 0.3% New Age, and 0.9% other religions. People who answered that they had no religion were 51.9%, and 7.2% of people did not answer the census question.

Of those at least 15 years old, 105 (12.9%) people had a bachelor's or higher degree, 423 (51.8%) had a post-high school certificate or diploma, and 294 (36.0%) people exclusively held high school qualifications. The median income was $38,900, compared with $41,500 nationally. 24 people (2.9%) earned over $100,000 compared to 12.1% nationally. The employment status of those at least 15 was 447 (54.8%) full-time, 90 (11.0%) part-time, and 21 (2.6%) unemployed.
