= Howard Joseph =

- Born: Howard Thornton Joseph; 25 August 1949 (age 77) Christchurch, New Zealand
- Height: 1.80 m (5 ft 11 in)
- Weight: 81 kg (179 lb)
- School: Christchurch Boys' High School
- University: University of Canterbury
- Occupation(s): Journalist, lawyer

Rugby union career
- Position: Centre
Provincial / State sides
| Years | Team | Apps | (Points) |
| 1968–71 | Canterbury | | |
International career
| Years | Team | Apps | (Points) |
| 1971 | New Zealand | 2 | (0) |

Howard Thornton Joseph (born 25 August 1949) is a former New Zealand rugby union player. A centre, Joseph represented Canterbury at a provincial level, and was a member of the New Zealand national side, the All Blacks, in 1971. He played two matches for the All Blacks, both of them tests against the touring British Lions. A journalist and lawyer, Joseph wrote a novel, Game Without End, published in 2007, about rugby in New Zealand.

He stood as the National Party candidate in the Christchurch electorate of Yaldhurst at the 1984 general election. He was unsuccessful in winning the seat, losing to the Labour Party candidate Margaret Austin.
