= Wigram =

Suburb of Christchurch, New Zealand

- Suburb
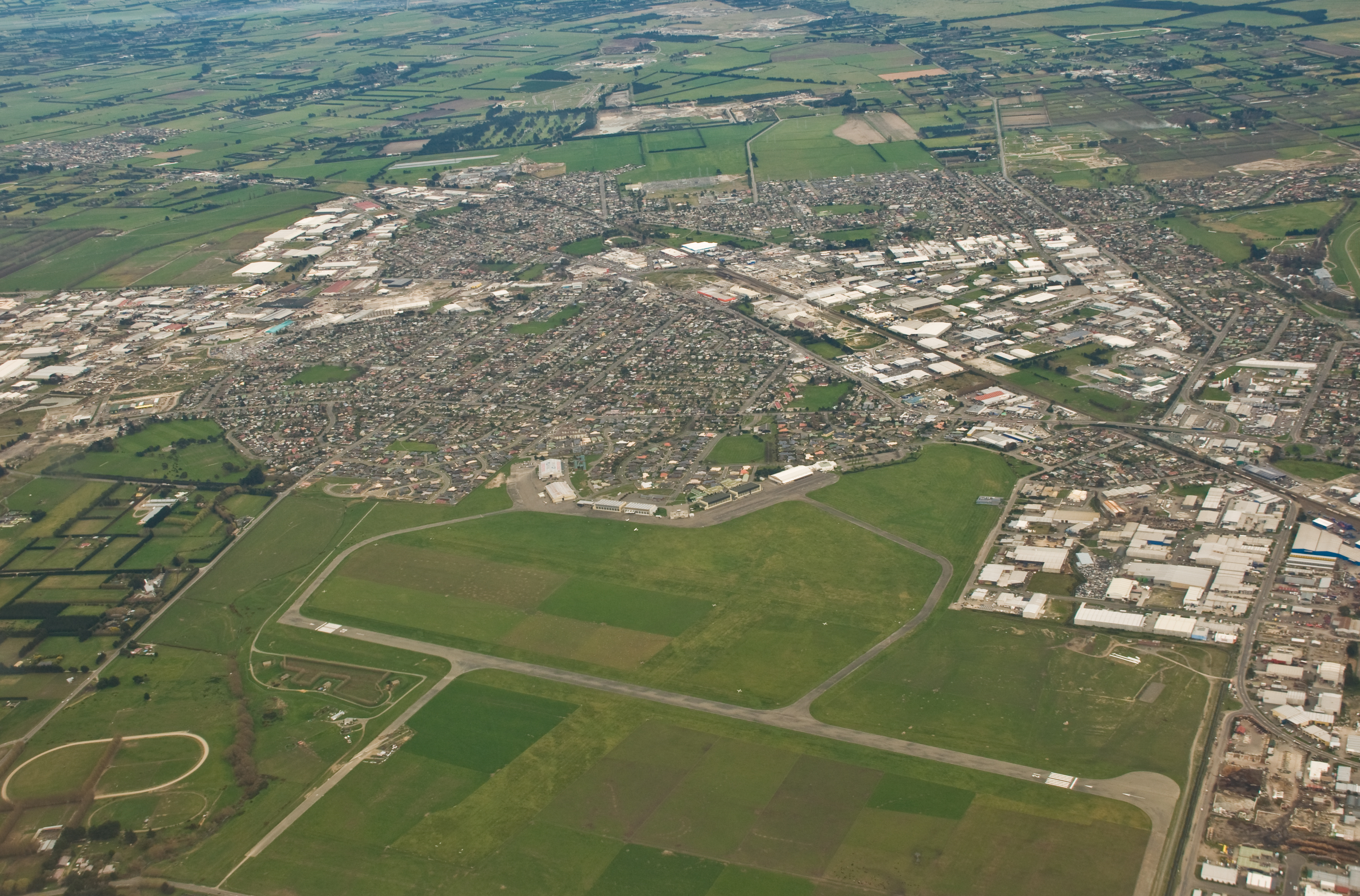
- The former Wigram Aerodrome, which has since been converted into the Wigram Skies development
- Interactive map of Wigram
- Coordinates: 43.5533°S 172.5584°E
- Country: New Zealand
- City: Christchurch
- Local authority: Christchurch City Council
- Electoral ward: Halswell; Hornby
- Community board: Waipuna Halswell-Hornby-Riccarton
- Established: 1923

Area
  - Land: 444 ha (1,100 acres)

Population (June 2025)
  - Total: 11,410
  - Density: 2,570/km^{2} (6,660/sq mi)
- Airports: Wigram Aerodrome (former)

Hei Hei	Sockburn	Upper Riccarton
Hornby	Wigram	Middleton
Halswell	Aidanfield	Hillmorton

Wigram is a suburb in the southwest of Christchurch, New Zealand. The suburb lies close to the industrial estates of Sockburn and the satellite retail and residential zone of Hornby, and has undergone significant growth in recent years due to housing developments. It is seven kilometres to the west of the city centre.

== Etymology ==
The suburb is named after Sir Henry Wigram, mayor of Christchurch from 1902 to 1903, who established a flying school there in 1916. Wigram kept the aviation school going until March 1923, when the government decided to take over the company and run the airbase under a military umbrella. The final purchase price was £31,012.

In June 1923 the base was officially handed over and renamed Wigram Aerodrome. Wigram continued to support the base, gifting a further 81 acres (33 ha) of land in 1932.

== History ==
The first trans-Tasman flight touched down in Wigram on 11 September 1928 at 9.22 a.m. Piloted by Australians Charles Kingsford Smith and Charles Ulm they departed Richmond, west of Sydney flying the Southern Cross. The welcome was tremendous. A crowd of 30,000 people, one quarter of the total population of Christchurch at that time, turned out to see this historic event. A plaque on the landing site at Wigram Skies commemorates the event. The Heritage Reserve, located on Bennington Way in the George West neighbourhood, marks the actual location of the touchdown by the Southern Cross. The commemorative plaque placed nearby was originally used in 1978 to mark the 50th Anniversary of this landing.

The worst RNZAF crash in New Zealand history occurred at Wigram on 15 October 1953, killing seven men. Two Royal New Zealand Air Force De Havilland Devons, the NZ1811 and NZ1810 from RNZAF Station Wigram, collided over Wigram Aerodrome. They had been part of the last section of a 27 aircraft flypast over Harewood International Airport (as Christchurch airport was then called) marking the 1953 London to Christchurch Air Race Prize Giving Ceremony. When the formation broke up as the aircraft prepared to land back at Wigram, NZ1811 was struck on the wing by its “No. 2”, NZ1810. Sixty-five years after the fatal air collision, a plaque, inset into a boulder and featuring the names of the flight crew has been placed next to a memorial seat in a reserve at the end of Edwin Ebbett Place. All seven crew members are remembered by street names in the area such as Erling Ziesler Lane.

Wigram was home to RNZAF Wigram, one of the main bases of the Royal New Zealand Air Force, but this was closed in 1995 after cutbacks in military spending. The majority of Wigram Aerodrome was purchased by Ngāi Tahu in 1997, and continued to be used as a private airfield until it was finally closed on 1 March 2009. The RNZAF retained the original portion of the aerodrome which had been purchased by the Crown for the purpose of an Air Force base in 1923, an area which includes the Air Force Museum of New Zealand.

The 21st century has seen several subdivision developments being undertaken in Wigram.

=== Wigram Skies ===
The remainder of the former airfield was subdivided by Ngāi Tahu Property into the Wigram Skies development following its closure. Street names in the new development reflect the area's aviation heritage, with names such as Corsair Drive, Kittyhawk Avenue and Skyhawk Road alongside The Runway – a road which follows the route of the former runway.

=== Broken Run (East) ===
In 2005, this subdivision created six new roads and two new formed and sealed rights of way to provide access to 126 new residential allotments, and six new reserves totalling 2.8 hectares.

The subdivision has been named “Broken Run” by Brian Gillman Limited, as the land before development was a grazing farm with a natural valley and waterway splitting the farm into two halves, thus being a broken farm or run. The property is located at the headwaters of the Heathcote River.

The road names in Broken Run share a common theme of high country stations, e.g. Longspur Avenue (Longspur is a high country station near the Rakaia Gorge) and Highpeak Place (Highpeak Station is located at the head of the Selwyn River).

=== Broken Run (West) ===
Surplus land from Christchurch's Southern Motorway extension was purchased in 2013 and subsequently developed by Gillman Wheelans in 2015. The Western part of Broken Run backs onto the original Broken Run subdivision separated by the Heathcote River. The subdivision created sixty-one residential allotments, two allotments to vest in the Council as reserve, and a further four allotments vested as legal road.

The road names for this stage continued the theme from the original Broken Run subdivision of high country farms e.g. Four Peaks Drive (Four Peaks Station, near Fairlie in South Canterbury).

== Geography ==
Wigram is north of Aidanfield, separated by the Christchurch Southern Motorway. Wigram also borders several other suburbs:

Middleton to the east, separated by Curletts Road.

Hornby to the west and northwest separated by Awatea Road (properties on Awatea road are not part of Wigram except a small number of properties on the east side of Awatea Road (numbers 65–135 inclusive), Springs Road and Main South Road (properties located on these roads are not part of Wigram)

Sockburn to the north separated by the Main South Line Railway

Hillmorton to the southeast separated by Curletts Road and the Heathcote River (Ōpāwaho)

=== Climate ===
Climate data for Wigram (1951–1980 normals, extremes 1937–1973)
Month	Jan	Feb	Mar	Apr	May	Jun	Jul	Aug	Sep	Oct	Nov	Dec	Year
Record high °C (°F)	35.8 (96.4)	41.2 (106.2)	33.7 (92.7)	29.3 (84.7)	27.3 (81.1)	22.1 (71.8)	20.9 (69.6)	22.6 (72.7)	25.4 (77.7)	28.1 (82.6)	31.2 (88.2)	32.8 (91.0)	41.2 (106.2)
Mean daily maximum °C (°F)	22.3 (72.1)	22.4 (72.3)	20.3 (68.5)	17.7 (63.9)	14.1 (57.4)	11.3 (52.3)	10.9 (51.6)	12.2 (54.0)	14.8 (58.6)	17.3 (63.1)	19.5 (67.1)	21.1 (70.0)	17.0 (62.6)
Daily mean °C (°F)	16.9 (62.4)	17.0 (62.6)	15.3 (59.5)	12.4 (54.3)	9.1 (48.4)	6.3 (43.3)	5.9 (42.6)	7.3 (45.1)	9.6 (49.3)	11.8 (53.2)	13.9 (57.0)	15.8 (60.4)	11.8 (53.2)
Mean daily minimum °C (°F)	11.4 (52.5)	11.5 (52.7)	10.2 (50.4)	7.0 (44.6)	4.0 (39.2)	1.3 (34.3)	0.9 (33.6)	2.3 (36.1)	4.3 (39.7)	6.3 (43.3)	8.2 (46.8)	10.4 (50.7)	6.5 (43.7)
Record low °C (°F)	2.8 (37.0)	1.9 (35.4)	−0.1 (31.8)	−2.4 (27.7)	−5.3 (22.5)	−5.9 (21.4)	−9.4 (15.1)	−5.3 (22.5)	−4.8 (23.4)	−4.0 (24.8)	−2.2 (28.0)	−0.1 (31.8)	−9.4 (15.1)
Average rainfall mm (inches)	61 (2.4)	39 (1.5)	59 (2.3)	64 (2.5)	66 (2.6)	51 (2.0)	65 (2.6)	52 (2.0)	41 (1.6)	41 (1.6)	51 (2.0)	46 (1.8)	636 (24.9)
Source: NIWA

== Demographics ==
The recent development of the Wigram Aerodrome into housing has resulted in the suburb growing significantly in recent years. This has made Wigram one of the fastest-growing suburbs in post-earthquake Christchurch.

Wigram covers 4.44 km^{2} (1.71 sq mi). It had an estimated population of 11,410 as of June 2025, with a population density of 2,570 people per km^{2}.

Historical population
Year	Pop.	±% p.a.
2006	2,076	—
2013	2,682	+3.73%
2018	7,689	+23.45%
2023	9,849	+5.08%
The 2006 population is for a larger area of 4.90 km^{2}. Source:

Wigram had a population of 9,849 in the 2023 New Zealand census, an increase of 2,160 people (28.1%) since the 2018 census, and an increase of 7,167 people (267.2%) since the 2013 census. There were 4,839 males, 4,983 females, and 24 people of other genders in 3,174 dwellings. 3.4% of people identified as LGBTIQ+. The median age was 35.6 years (compared with 38.1 years nationally). There were 1,806 people (18.3%) aged under 15 years, 2,004 (20.3%) aged 15 to 29, 4,473 (45.4%) aged 30 to 64, and 1,566 (15.9%) aged 65 or older.

People could identify as more than one ethnicity. The results were 45.7% European (Pākehā); 5.6% Māori; 2.3% Pasifika; 50.4% Asian; 2.2% Middle Eastern, Latin American and African New Zealanders (MELAA); and 1.5% other, which includes people giving their ethnicity as "New Zealander". English was spoken by 90.3%, Māori by 1.2%, Samoan by 0.7%, and other languages by 39.0%. No language could be spoken by 3.0% (e.g. too young to talk). New Zealand Sign Language was known by 0.3%. The percentage of people born overseas was 47.9, compared with 28.8% nationally.

Religious affiliations were 35.0% Christian, 5.5% Hindu, 3.0% Islam, 0.1% Māori religious beliefs, 2.5% Buddhist, 0.2% New Age, and 2.2% other religions. People who answered that they had no religion were 46.0%, and 5.7% of people did not answer the census question.

Of those at least 15 years old, 2,790 (34.7%) people had a bachelor's or higher degree, 3,249 (40.4%) had a post-high school certificate or diploma, and 2,007 (25.0%) people exclusively held high school qualifications. The median income was $42,100, compared with $41,500 nationally. 792 people (9.8%) earned over $100,000 compared to 12.1% nationally. The employment status of those at least 15 was 4,275 (53.2%) full-time, 972 (12.1%) part-time, and 198 (2.5%) unemployed.

Individual statistical areas
Name	Area (km^{2})	Population	Density (per km^{2})	Dwellings	Median age	Median income
Awatea North	0.57	1,920	3,368	573	37.3 years	$40,500
Wigram North	0.77	1,227	1,594	426	40.2 years	$33,800
Wigram West	0.46	1,392	3,026	459	35.9 years	$41,500
Awatea South	1.51	2,502	1,657	792	34.1 years	$44,700
Wigram South	0.40	1,302	3,255	435	33.9 years	$44,800
Wigram East	0.31	870	2,806	288	34.4 years	$47,100
Broken Run	0.42	636	1,514	201	37.3 years	$45,900
New Zealand					38.1 years	$41,500

Wigram is one of Christchurch's more affluent suburbs with residents earning, on average, over 10% more than the average Christchurch resident.

== Economy ==
=== Commercial ===
The Landing, located at the heart of Wigram Skies, provides a convenient and modern retail and mixed use space for Wigram Skies residents and greater south west Christchurch. Stage one of The Landing, which was completed in mid-2015, has a 8975 sqm site area, including 2000 sqm of retail and office space spread across three buildings and a 2600 sqm New World supermarket.

Stage Two, which was completed in 2017 boasts a 3509sq m site area, including 1800sq m of retail, 600sq m of office space, and 451sq m of hospitality spread across three buildings.

The latest development, a new Cimena Complex with eight cinema screens, each seating 48 people, is set to Open in July 2021

=== Industrial ===
One of the hotspots in the Christchurch scene is Wigram Business Park, developed by Ngāi Tahu, with most of the properties sold to owner occupiers. It is located on Hayton Road on approximately 25 hectares of zoned Business 4 and has 52 lots. It adjoins Hayton Stream and multiple reserves which separate it from Wigram Skies.

The park is now home to a collection of occupiers and is popular among businesses wanting to occupy modern, state-of-the-art premises on land to the west of Christchurch.

Wigram Business Park provides for businesses in Christchurch who were expanding but also offered a safe alternative for operators who were looking at relocating or re-establishing their businesses after earthquakes. One example is the purchase by NZX 50 listed Skellerup of a 3.4-hectare site in 2013 for $7.1 million which was subsequently developed into a $30 million, 18,900-square-metre purpose built manufacturing and office facilities to replace their quake-damaged Woolston site.

Another NZX 50 company to have modern premises in Wigram is Mainfreight with the development of their Hayton Road Logistics site completed in May 2015.

== Transport ==
=== Road ===
Wigram is well-connected for road transport, with direct access via Parkhouse Road/Curletts Road to the State Highway Motorway network:

- State Highway 76 with access to the City Centre and Lyttelton.
- State Highway 73 with access to Upper Riccarton and Christchurch International Airport.
- State Highway 75 with access to Halswell and Akaroa.

Three Super-T bridges connect Wigram via local link roads with its neighbouring suburbs:

- Wigram Magdala Link Bridge a three-span Super-T bridge which is 100 metres long passing over Curletts Road, opened on 29 July 2016 it connects Wigram with Middleton and provides another direct link to the central city.
- Aidanfield Drive Bridge connecting Wigram to Aidanfield
- Awatea Road Bridge connecting Wigram to Halswell

=== Public transport ===
Wigram is also well served by several bus services, operated under the Metro brand, which is subsidised by Environment Canterbury.

The following routes pass directly through or on the border of Wigram:

- Route 60 – Hillmorton/Southshore – Starting at The Landing via Corsair Drive and Skyhawk Road
- Route 80 – Lincoln/Parklands – Passing Springs Road
- Route 100 – Wigram/The Palms – via The Runway and Corsair Drive
- Route 125 – Redwood/Westlake – Passing Awatea Road

== Landmarks and features ==
=== National institutions ===
The Air Force Museum of New Zealand, formerly called The Royal New Zealand Air Force Museum, is the national museum for the Royal New Zealand Air Force (RNZAF) and New Zealand military aviation, and stands on the site of the former air base. Also located on the Crown-owned, New Zealand Defence Force site is the Archives New Zealand Repository on Harvard Ave which was officially opened on 9 October 2018.

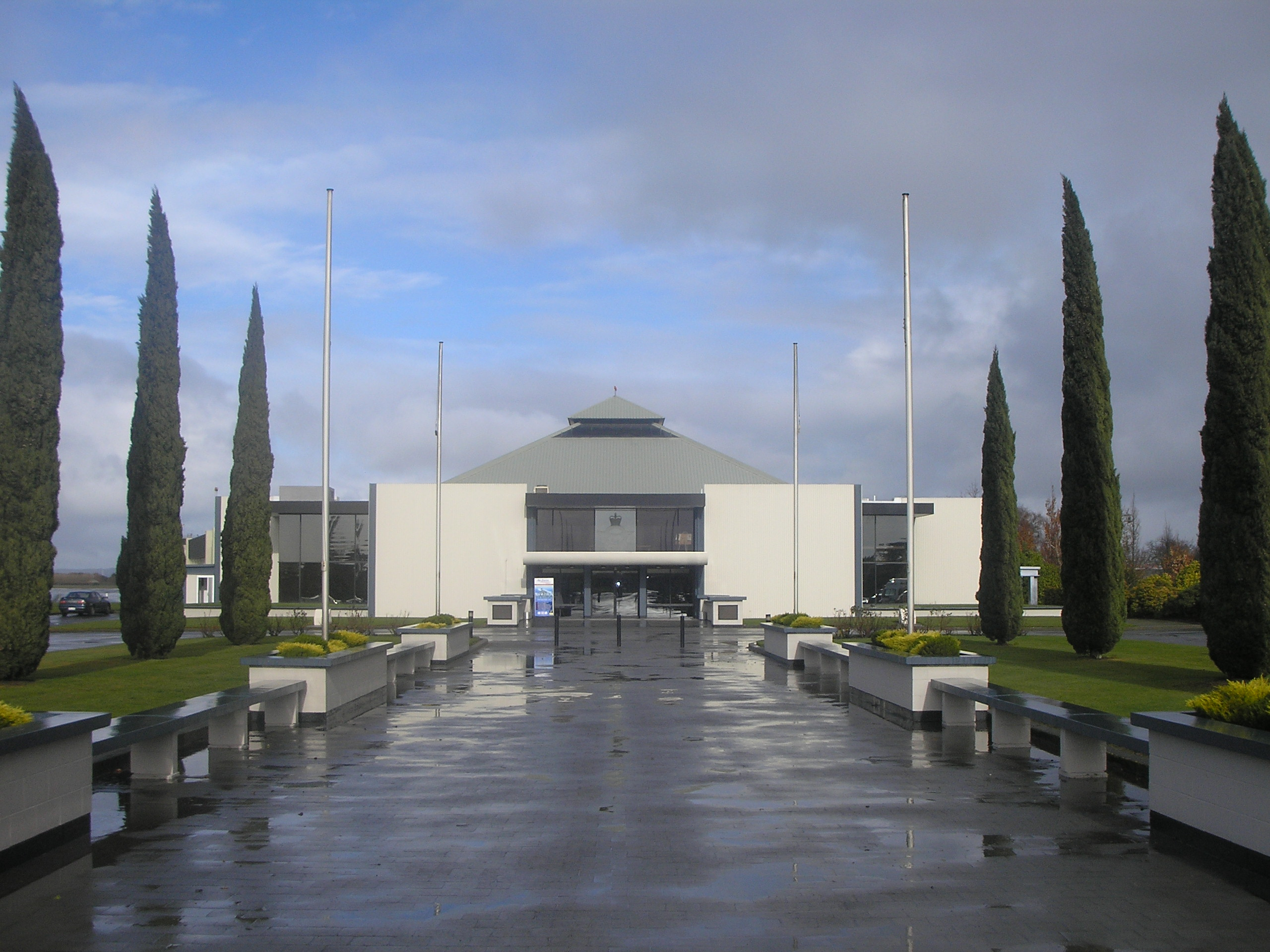
Entrance to the RNZAF Museum

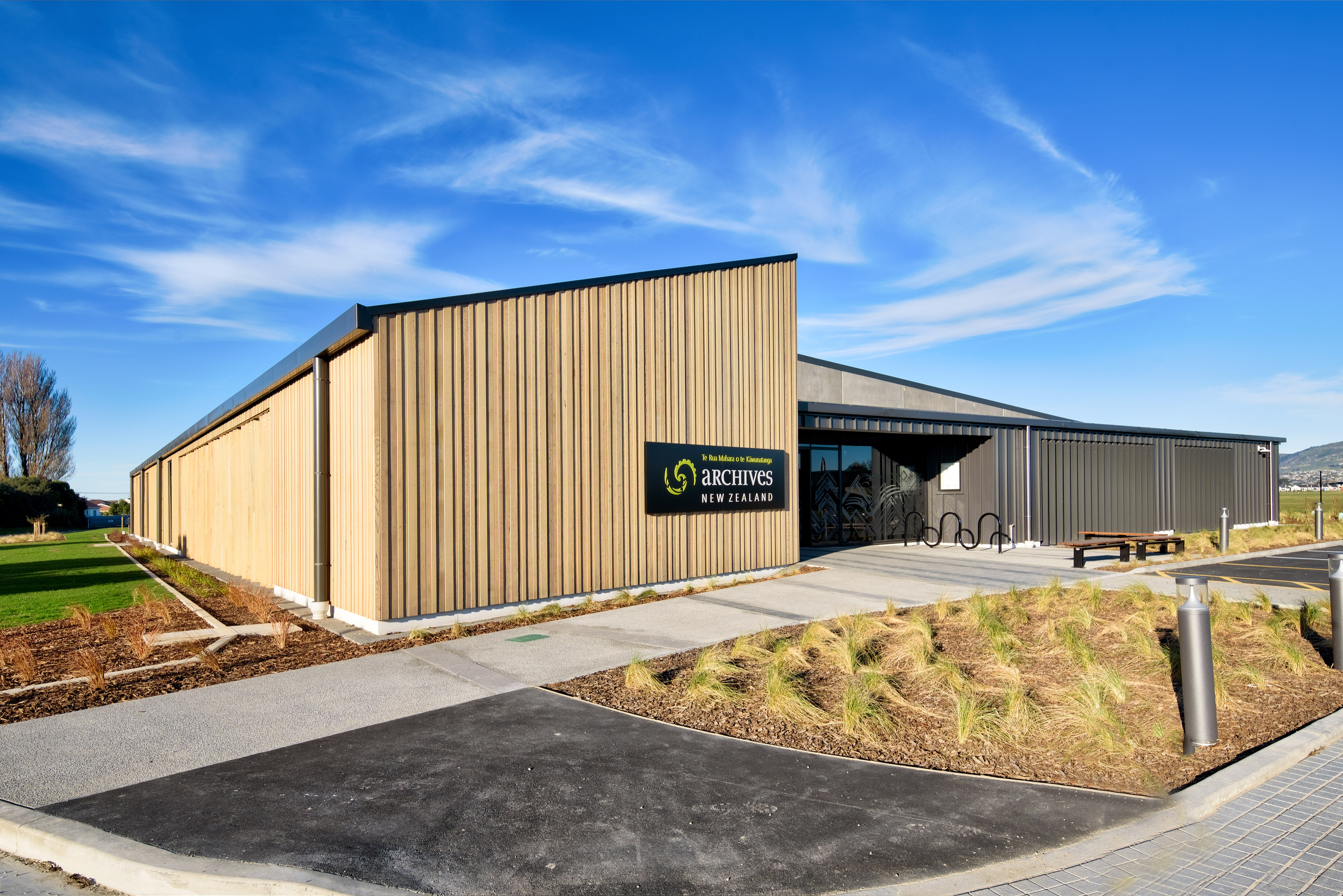
Archives New Zealand on Harvard Ave

=== Parks, sports and recreation ===
Wigram has two large recreational parks adjoining each other, Ngā Puna Wai Sports Hub was opened on 8 March 2019 and comprises 32 hectares (79 acres) of recreation, esplanade reserve and other park land as well as a new $53.65 million multi-sports facility whilst future plans include a new $20 million indoor sports centre. Canterbury Agricultural Park is a large open space of around 130 hectares (320 acres), and is famous for the Canterbury A&P Show

There are also several smaller local neighbourhood parks, the largest of these is Te Kāhu Park bound by The Runway, Curtis Street, Dalwood Drive and Porter Street, boasting a children’s playground, three sports pitches within walking distance of all residences and is the home ground for the Halswell Wigram Rugby Club.

Other parks include:

- Parera Park on Kittyhawk Avenue, featuring a natural playground.
- Kahuku Park between The Runway and Limbrick Crescent, featuring a rock climbing sculpture.
- Marama Park on the corner of Skyhawk Road and Kittyhawk Avenue, featuring a basketball court.
- Harvard Park on Corsair Drive
- Tautoru Park on Kittyhawk Avenue, featuring a tennis court as well as playground.
- Raukura Park bound by The Runway, Keene Street and Corsair Drive
- Mackinder Reserve bound by Skyhawk Road, Mackinder Drive, Valiant Street and Wigram Road.
- Motorway Park Playground on Highpeak Place featuring a tennis court as well as playground.
- Bendrose Reserve on Bendrose Crescent, which includes Broken Run Playground
- West Broken Run Reserve on Wigram Road, which has the upper limits of the Ōpawaho Heathcote River running through it

=== Elderly housing and care ===
Wigram has two modern retirement villages, the first to open was Lady Wigram Village which opened in 2015 and is located on Kittyhawk Avenue. Opening soon after in 2016 was Summerset at Wigram located on Awatea Road on the South West edge of Wigram.

== Education ==
- Wigram Primary School – Te Piki Kāhu relocated to The Runway, Wigram, from Sockburn in January 2019, teaching children from years 1 to 6. It has a roll of 482 students as of July 2026. The school opened as Sockburn School in 1955.

== Governance ==
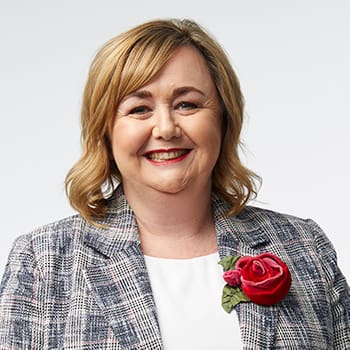
Member of Parliament for Wigram, Dr Megan Woods

=== Community board ===
Wigram is represented in the Waipuna/Halswell-Hornby-Riccarton Community Board by two Halswell Ward Community Board members, Andrei Moore and Debbie Mora.

=== Council ward ===
Wigram is part of the Halswell Ward represented by Councillor Andrei Moore since 2022.

=== National electorate ===
The Suburb of Wigram sits in the aptly named New Zealand parliamentary electorate of Wigram.

The local MP representing the Wigram Electorate since 2011 is Dr Megan Woods.
