= 1984 New Zealand general election =

- 14 July 1984

95 seats in the Parliament 48 seats needed for a majority
- Turnout: 93.7%
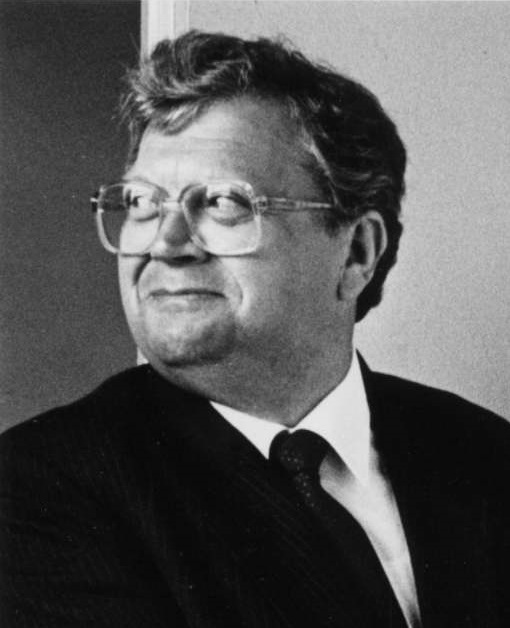

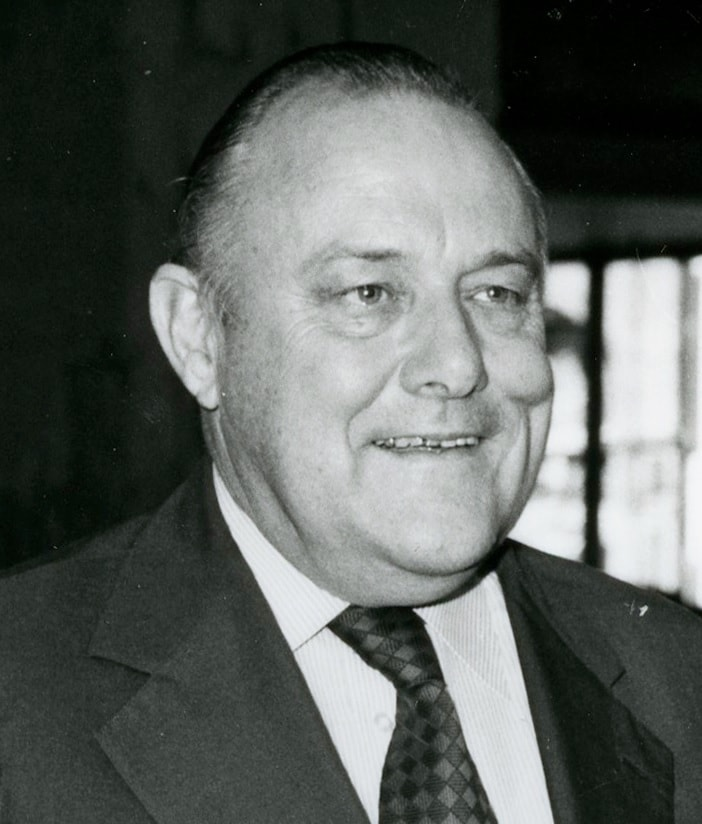

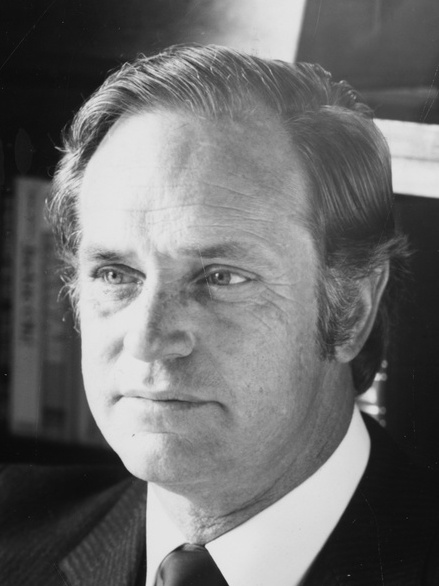

	First party	Second party
Leader	David Lange	Robert Muldoon
Party	Labour	National
Leader since	3 February 1983	9 July 1974
Leader's seat	Mangere	Tamaki
Last election	43 seats, 39.01%	47 seats, 38.77%
Seats won	56	37
Seat change	▲13	▼10
Popular vote	829,154	692,494
Percentage	42.98%	35.89%
Swing	▲3.97%	▼2.88%
	Third party	Fourth party
Leader	Bruce Beetham	Bob Jones
Party	Social Credit	NZ Party
Leader since	14 May 1972	21 August 1983
Leader's seat	Rangitikei (lost seat)	Ran in Ohariu (lost)
Last election	2 seats, 20.65%	Not yet founded
Seats won	2	0
Seat change	0	0
Popular vote	147,162	236,385
Percentage	7.63%	12.25%
Swing	▼13.02%	▲12.25%
- Results by electorate, shaded by winning margin
Prime Minister before election
Robert Muldoon
National
Subsequent Prime Minister
David Lange
Labour

The 1984 New Zealand general election was a nationwide vote to determine the composition of the 41st New Zealand Parliament. It marked the beginning of the Fourth Labour Government, with David Lange's Labour Party defeating the long-serving Prime Minister, Robert Muldoon, of the National Party. It was also the last election in which the Social Credit Party won seats as an independent entity. The election was also the only one in which the New Zealand Party, a protest party, played any substantial role.

A snap election, Muldoon called for it a month prior. When doing so he was both live on television and visibly drunk, leading to the election being dubbed the "schnapps election".

== Background ==
Before the election, the National Party governed with 47 seats, a small majority. The opposition Labour Party held 43 seats, and the Social Credit Party held two. Although National theoretically commanded a two-seat lead over the other parties, dissent within the National caucus (particularly by Marilyn Waring and Mike Minogue) resulted in serious problems for National leader Robert Muldoon. Muldoon felt that he could no longer maintain a majority until the end of the sitting year.

The 1984 election was called when Waring told Muldoon that she would not support his government in the vote over an opposition-sponsored anti-nuclear bill. Muldoon, visibly drunk, announced a snap election on national television on the night of 14 June. It is believed that Muldoon's behaviour was also the result of a number of personal factors, including, not least, tiredness and frustration, but alcohol and diabetes also, issues that had been plaguing him for some time. Muldoon's drunkenness while making the announcement led to the election being nicknamed the "schnapps election".

There is debate over whether the election was necessary—Waring had not threatened to block confidence and supply, meaning that the government could still have continued on even if it had lost the anti-nuclear vote. Nevertheless, Muldoon appears to have wanted an election to reinforce his mandate (just as Sidney Holland sought and won a mandate to oppose striking dock-workers with the 1951 snap election).

Muldoon's government, which had been growing increasingly unpopular in its third term, was seen as rigid, inflexible, and increasingly unresponsive to public concerns. The Labour Party had actually gained a plurality of the vote in the previous two elections, but had narrowly missed out on getting a majority of the seats. Labour's primary campaign message was one of change—Muldoon's government, which employed wage and price controls in an attempt to "guide" the economy, was widely blamed for poor economic performance. Labour also campaigned to reduce government borrowing, and to enact nuclear-free policy.

The New Zealand Party, founded by property tycoon Bob Jones, was launched primarily to oppose the Muldoon government (although it did not support Labour). A right-wing liberal party, it promoted less government control over markets, in contrast to the paternalist and somewhat authoritarian policies of National, the other significant right-wing party.

=== MPs retiring in 1984 ===
Seven National MPs and two Labour MPs intended to retire at the end of the 40th Parliament.

Party	Name	Electorate	Date announced
National	Duncan MacIntyre	East Cape	10 March 1984
National	Peter Wilkinson	Kaipara	8 November 1982
National	Derek Quigley	Rangiora	17 June 1984
National	Allan Highet	Remuera	24 March 1983
National	David Thomson	Taranaki	7 February 1984
National	Keith Allen	Tauranga	16 March 1984
National	Marilyn Waring	Waipa	13 February 1984
Labour	Bill Rowling	Tasman	23 April 1983
Labour	Mick Connelly	Yaldhurst	1 May 1983

Table of major debates
Date	Time	Organiser(s)	Moderator(s)	Subject	Participants			
Date	Time	Organiser(s)	Moderator(s)	Subject	National	Labour	Socred	NZ Party
1 July		TVNZ	Richard Harman; Ian Johnstone; Phillip Melchior	Multi-party	Present; Muldoon	Present; Lange	Present; Beetham	Present; Jones
8 July	8:25pm	TVNZ	Ian Johnstone	Leaders debate	Present; Muldoon	Present; Lange	Absent	Absent
8 July	10:00pm	RNZ	Sharon Crosbie	Multi-party	Present; Muldoon	Present; Lange	Present; Beetham	Present; Jones

== Electoral changes ==
The 1983 electoral redistribution was even more politically influenced than the previous one in 1977. The Labour Party believed it had been disadvantaged in 1977 and it was not to let this happen again. Every proposal was put to intense scrutiny, and this resulted in the electoral redistribution taking forty-one working days; the average length of the five previous redistributions was eight. As Social Credit had two MPs, the Labour Party nominee on the commission formally represented that party, which further increased tensions. The 1981 census had shown that the North Island had experienced further population growth, and three additional general seats were created, bringing the total number of electorates to 95. The South Island had, for the first time, experienced a population loss, but its number of general electorates was fixed at 25 since the 1967 electoral redistribution. More of the South Island population was moving to Christchurch, and two electorates were abolished (Dunedin Central and Papanui), while two electorates were recreated (Christchurch North and Dunedin West). In the North Island, six electorates were newly created (Glenfield, Otara, Panmure, Tongariro, Waikaremoana, and West Auckland), three electorates were recreated (Franklin, Raglan, and Rodney), and six electorates were abolished (Albany, Helensville, Hunua, Otahuhu, Rangiriri, and Taupo).

== The election ==
The election was held on 14 July. There were 2,111,651 registered voters. Turnout was 93.7%, the highest turnout ever recorded in a New Zealand election. Most political scientists attribute the high turnout to a desire by voters for change.

Immediately after the election there was a constitutional crisis when Muldoon initially refused to follow the advice of the incoming Labour government and devalue the New Zealand dollar.

Detailed map of results, with electorates named, numbered and shaded by winning margin. In bottom right are the Māori electorates.

== Results ==
The 1984 election saw the Labour Party win 56 of the 95 seats in parliament, a gain of 13. This was enough for it to hold an outright majority and form the fourth Labour government. The National Party won only 37 seats, a loss of ten. The New Zealand Party, despite winning 12.2% of the vote, failed to gain any seats at all. Social Credit managed to win two seats, the same number as it had held previously. The Values Party, an environmentalist group, gained fifth place, but no seats.

There were 95 seats being contested in the 1984 election, three more than in the previous parliament. All but two of these seats were won by one of the two major parties.

The Labour Party, previously in opposition, won 56 seats, an outright majority. Most of the seats won by Labour were in urban areas, following the party's typical pattern. Exceptions to this general trend include the eastern tip of the North Island and the western coast of the South Island. Labour's strongest regions were the Wellington area (where the party won every seat), as well as the western and southern areas of Auckland where most of the poorest lived, Christchurch and Dunedin (cities in which it won most seats). Smaller cities such as Hamilton, Nelson, Napier, Hastings and Palmerston North were also won by Labour. As expected, Labour also won all four Māori seats, maintaining its traditional strength there.

The National Party, the incumbent government, was (as expected) strongest in rural areas. Most of the rural North Island was won by National, as were most of the rural areas on the South Island's eastern coast. In the larger cities, the party fared poorly, with the northern and the eastern affluent areas of Auckland and the western areas of Christchurch being the only places that the party won seats. It was more successful in smaller cities, however, winning Rotorua, Tauranga, Invercargill, New Plymouth and Whangārei. It was placed second in two Māori electorates, and third in the other two.

The only minor party to win electorates was the Social Credit Party, which won East Coast Bays and Pakuranga (both in Auckland). It had held East Coast Bays before the election, but won Pakuranga for the first time. It did not manage to retain Rangitikei, which it had also held before the election. Social Credit candidates were placed second in six electorates, including Rangitikei.

The New Zealand Party, despite gaining more votes than Social Credit, did not win any seats. Some commentators have suggested that the party was not seeking to do so, and instead was merely acting as a spoiler for National. This impression has been backed up by comments by Bob Jones himself. The party was, however, placed second in the electorates of Remuera (an affluent part of Auckland), Kaimai, and Tauranga.

The Values Party, an environmentalist group, managed to win 0.2% of the vote, substantially below previous efforts. The party, which was in slow decline, would eventually vanish, but its ideals and goals would be reborn in the Green Party.

In two of the Māori electorates, the Mana Motuhake party gained second place, but the party did not gain a substantial number of votes elsewhere.

No independent candidates won seats, but one independent candidate, Mel Courtney, was placed second in the electorate of Nelson.

== Detailed results ==
=== Party results ===
Party	Candidates	Votes		Seats won	Change
Party	Candidates	Count	Of total (%)	Seats won	Change
Labour	95	829,154	42.98	56	+13
National	95	692,494	35.90	37	−10
NZ Party	95	236,385	12.25	0	0
Social Credit	95	147,162	7.63	2	0
Mana Motuhake	8	5,989	0.31	0	0
Values	29	3,871	0.20	0	0
Others	57	20,588	1.07	0	0
Total	466	1,929,201		95	+3

=== Votes summary ===
Popular Vote
Labour	42.97%
National	35.89%
NZ Party	12.25%
Social Credit	7.63%
Mana Motuhake	0.31%
Values	0.20%
Others	1.07%

Parliament seats
Labour	58.95%
National	38.95%
Social Credit	2.10%

=== Electorate results ===
The tables below shows the results of the 1984 general election:

Key

National	Labour	NZ Party
Social Credit	Mana Motuhake	Independent

Electorate results for the 1984 New Zealand general election.
Electorate	Incumbent	Winner	Majority	Runner up
General electorates
Ashburton	Rob Talbot		472	Geoff Stone
Auckland Central	Richard Prebble		8,876	Maureen Eardley-Wilmot
Avon	Mary Batchelor		7,771	Andrew Cowie
Awarua	Rex Austin		384	Barry Rait
Bay of Islands	Neill Austin		3,298	Les Hunter
Birkenhead	Jim McLay		1,717	John Course
Christchurch Central	Geoffrey Palmer		8,508	Tony Willy
Christchurch North	New electorate	Mike Moore	5,728	David Dumergue
Clutha	Robin Gray		4,522	M J Sheppard
Dunedin North	Stan Rodger		5,129	Barbara Henderson
Dunedin West	New electorate	Clive Matthewson	6,011	Derek Russell
East Cape	Duncan MacIntyre	Anne Fraser	755	Robyn J. Leeming
East Coast Bays	Gary Knapp		2,020	Murray McCully
Eastern Hutt	Trevor Young		6,005	Joy McLauchlan
Eden	Aussie Malcolm	Richard Northey	2,306	Aussie Malcolm
Fendalton	Philip Burdon		1,457	Murray Dobson
Franklin	New electorate	Bill Birch	5,210	Roy Haywood
Gisborne	Bob Bell	Allan Wallbank	2,168	Bob Bell
Glenfield	New electorate	Judy Keall	809	David Schnauer
Hamilton East	Ian Shearer	Bill Dillon	1,100	Ian Shearer
Hamilton West	Mike Minogue	Trevor Mallard	803	Mike Minogue
Hastings	David Butcher		4,273	Peter Brown
Hauraki	Graeme Lee		3,432	Alisdair Thompson
Hawke's Bay	Richard Harrison	Bill Sutton	974	Richard Harrison
Heretaunga	Bill Jeffries		4,537	Anna MacFarlane
Horowhenua	Geoff Thompson	Annette King	447	Geoff Thompson
Invercargill	Norman Jones		1,279	Dougal Soper
Island Bay	Frank O'Flynn		6,007	John Kananghinis
Kaimai	Bruce Townshend		3,696	Leslie Dickson
Kaipara	Peter Wilkinson	Lockwood Smith	5,564	Bill Campbell
Kapiti	Margaret Shields		4,514	June Oakley
King Country	Jim Bolger		5,617	Jim Simons
Lyttelton	Ann Hercus		4,963	Doug Graham (Note: The candidate Doug Graham who contested the Lyttelton electorate for National is a different person from Doug Graham, who contested and won the Remuera seat.)
Manawatu	Michael Cox		420	Dave Alton
Mangere	David Lange		8,375	Peter Saunders
Manurewa	Roger Douglas		4,933	Stuart Leenstra
Marlborough	Doug Kidd		612	George MacDonald
Matamata	Jack Luxton		5,785	Ross Clow
Miramar	Peter Neilsen		3,499	Don Crosbie
Mt Albert	Helen Clark		6,207	Rod Cavanagh
Napier	Geoff Braybrooke		6,399	M P Liddell
Nelson	Philip Woollaston		3,678	Mel Courtney
New Lynn	Jonathan Hunt		6,340	Ron Hanson
New Plymouth	Tony Friedlander		269	Ida Gaskin
North Shore	George Gair		3,710	Peter Harris
Ohariu	Hugh Templeton	Peter Dunne	1,371	Hugh Templeton (Note: Bob Jones came third for the New Zealand Party in Ohariu)
Onehunga	Fred Gerbic		4,508	Carol Freeman
Otago	Warren Cooper		1,375	David Polson
Otara	New electorate	Colin Moyle	6,519	Taua Michael Tafua
Pahiatua	John Falloon		5,478	Malcolm Brazendale
Pakuranga	Pat Hunt	Neil Morrison	172	Pat Hunt
Palmerston North	Trevor de Cleene		3,033	Colleen Singleton
Panmure	New electorate	Bob Tizard	5,979	Carolyn Tedesco
Papakura	Merv Wellington		1,447	Lynn John
Papatoetoe	Eddie Isbey		2,996	Peter O'Brien
Pencarrow	Fraser Colman		5,418	Barry Cranston
Porirua	Gerry Wall		5,418	Arthur Leonard Gadsby
Raglan	New electorate	Simon Upton	1,976	Linda Holmes
Rangiora	Derek Quigley	Jim Gerard	346	Brian Tomlinson
Rangitikei	Bruce Beetham	Denis Marshall	504	Bruce Beetham
Remuera	Allan Highet	Doug Graham	3,483	Kenneth Sandford
Rodney	New electorate	Don McKinnon	3,876	Brian Dent
Roskill	Phil Goff		4,208	Chris Knowles
Rotorua	Paul East		811	Brian Arps
St Albans	David Caygill		6,172	Ian Wilson
St Kilda	Michael Cullen		5,594	Stewart Clark
Selwyn	Ruth Richardson		3,829	Charles Manning
Sydenham	John Kirk (Note: In July 1983 Kirk said he would not stand in 1984: when Anderton was selected for Sydenham, Kirk (a Lange supporter) withdrew from the Labour caucus and was suspended by Labour, becoming an independent)	Jim Anderton	7,255	Pat Bonisch
Tamaki	Robert Muldoon		3,758	Robin Tulloch
Taranaki	David Thomson	Roger Maxwell	6,013	Graeme Waters
Tarawera	Ian McLean		3,377	Malcolm Moore
Tasman	Bill Rowling	Ken Shirley	1,854	Gerald Hunt
Tauranga	Keith Allen	Winston Peters	4,912	David Parlour
Te Atatu	Michael Bassett		4,991	Frank Diment
Timaru	Basil Arthur		2,219	Maurice McTigue
Tongariro	New electorate	Noel Scott	3,870	Nelson Rangi
Waikaremoana	New electorate	Roger McClay	1,737	John Harré
Waikato	Simon Upton	Rob Storey	1,658	Peter Cleave
Waipa	Marilyn Waring	Katherine O'Regan	5,667	Anthony H. Allen
Wairarapa	Ben Couch	Reg Boorman	394	Ben Couch
Waitakere	Ralph Maxwell		4,474	John McIntosh
Waitaki	Jonathan Elworthy	Jim Sutton	561	Jonathan Elworthy
Waitotara	Venn Young		3,314	Stuart Perry
Wallace	Derek Angus		5,663	Calvin Fisher
Wanganui	Russell Marshall		3,918	Terry Heffernan
Wellington Central	Fran Wilde		4,116	Rosemary Young-Rouse
West Auckland	New electorate	Jack Elder	2,229	Dail Jones
West Coast	Kerry Burke		4,293	John Bateman
Western Hutt	John Terris		4,348	John Tanner
Whangarei	John Banks		2,003	Barbara Magner
Yaldhurst	Mick Connelly	Margaret Austin	2,970	Howard Joseph
Māori electorates
Eastern Maori	Peter Tapsell		11,230	Barry Kiwara
Northern Maori	Bruce Gregory		7,688	Matiu Rata
Southern Maori	Whetu Tirikatene-Sullivan		10,495	Amster Reedy
Western Maori	Koro Wētere		10,110	Bill Katene

Table footnotes:

=== Summary of changes ===
- Eleven new seats were created, of which seven (Christchurch North, Dunedin West, Glenfield, Otara, Panmure, Tongariro and West Auckland) were won by Labour, and four (Franklin, Raglan, Rodney and Waikaremoana) by National.
- A further ten seats were won by Labour from National: East Cape, Eden, Hamilton East, Hamilton West, Hawkes Bay, Horowhenua, Ohariu, Wairarapa and Waitaki. Social Credit lost Rangitikei to National. National also lost Pakuranga to Social Credit.
- Nine electorates had incumbent MPs retire and replaced them with MPs from the same party, six National and three Labour. Kaipara, Rangiora, Taranaki, Tauranga, Waikato and Waipa remained National, while Sydenham, Tasman and Yaldhurst remained Labour. In Rangiora, National MP Derek Quigley's decision not to stand for re-election followed serious clashes with Muldoon over economic policy, while in Sydenham, John Kirk had resigned from the Labour Party.

== Major policy platforms ==
=== Labour Party ===
- Central aims
  - "A society where people don't feel challenged to be nasty about everyone else" – David Lange. Drawn together to work for the interests of their country, a chance for everyone to have a chance to be equal, in education, society and jobs (regardless of gender or race). A programme of moderation and realism.
- State of economy
  - To take stock of the overseas debt, focus on the unemployment rates. To target money into jobs which use New Zealand resources which turn our primary production into a higher value product. Using tourism as an employment generator. Assigning resources to small businesses and enterprises.
- Nuclear issues
  - Opposed to nuclear testing. Keeping New Zealand defended without nuclear propelled vessels. Discuss with the allies and traders moving forward nuclear free,
- Prices, Incomes and industrial
  - Industrial relations policy government boss and worker have to fix limits, bargaining, you cannot have country where prices can soar and wages are screwed down.

=== National Party ===
- Central aims
  - To get New Zealand through difficult times with success. To deal with political issues sensibly and realistically in a way that is based on practical rather than theoretical considerations. Match taxation to promises.
- State of economy
  - Continue to tackle problems at their source, support for wage and price freezes. To adopt a business mindset, use overseas borrowing for huge projects to get net earnings.
- Nuclear issues
  - Opposed to nuclear testing and weapons. Opposed to making them, using them or storing them. ANZUS nuclear propelled vessels are permitted to keep the ANZUS treaty.
- Prices, Incomes and industrial
  - Wage and price freeze will work, it's what the public wants. Long term wage-fixing system, agreement with unions and employers.

=== Further reading ===
- Nuclear context: New Zealand nuclear-free zone#Historical background
- Economic context: Think Big
