= Yaldhurst =

Suburb of Christchurch, New Zealand

- Suburb
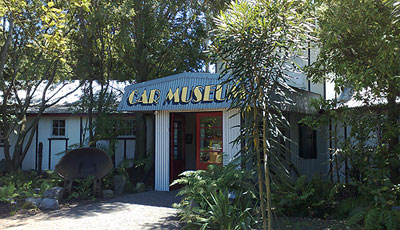
- Yaldhurst Museum
- Interactive map of Yaldhurst
- Coordinates: 43.512°S 172.509°E
- Country: New Zealand
- City: Christchurch
- Local authority: Christchurch City Council
- Electoral ward: Harewood; Hornby
- Community board: Waimāero Fendalton-Waimairi-Harewood; Waipuna Halswell-Hornby-Riccarton

Area
  - Land: 1,211 ha (2,990 acres)

Population (June 2025)
  - Total: 2,700
  - Density: 220/km^{2} (580/sq mi)

	McLeans Island	Christchurch Airport
Paparua	Yaldhurst	Russley
Templeton	Islington	Hei Hei; Broomfield

Yaldhurst is a semi-rural suburb on the western outskirts of Christchurch city. Frederick William Delamain (1835–1910), a settler and horse breeder, named a horse Yaldhurst after some stables in England. The area was named after the horse.

The Yaldhurst Museum is a private museum specialising in displays of land vehicles and technology.

Yaldhurst electorate extended over a larger rural area west of Christchurch from 1978 to 1996.

== Demographics ==
Yaldhurst covers 12.11 km^{2} (4.68 sq mi). It had an estimated population of 2,700 as of June 2025, with a population density of 223 people per km^{2}.

Historical population
Year	Pop.	±% p.a.
2006	714	—
2013	1,434	+10.48%
2018	1,602	+2.24%
2023	2,349	+7.96%

Yaldhurst had a population of 2,349 in the 2023 New Zealand census, an increase of 747 people (46.6%) since the 2018 census, and an increase of 915 people (63.8%) since the 2013 census. There were 1,161 males, 1,176 females, and 12 people of other genders in 831 dwellings. 3.4% of people identified as LGBTIQ+. The median age was 35.2 years (compared with 38.1 years nationally). There were 375 people (16.0%) aged under 15 years, 555 (23.6%) aged 15 to 29, 1,122 (47.8%) aged 30 to 64, and 297 (12.6%) aged 65 or older.

People could identify as more than one ethnicity. The results were 60.5% European (Pākehā); 6.6% Māori; 1.9% Pasifika; 35.6% Asian; 2.0% Middle Eastern, Latin American and African New Zealanders (MELAA); and 1.8% other, which includes people giving their ethnicity as "New Zealander". English was spoken by 94.9%, Māori by 1.4%, Samoan by 0.8%, and other languages by 26.9%. No language could be spoken by 2.7% (e.g. too young to talk). New Zealand Sign Language was known by 0.4%. The percentage of people born overseas was 38.1, compared with 28.8% nationally.

Religious affiliations were 36.7% Christian, 5.9% Hindu, 2.4% Islam, 0.1% Māori religious beliefs, 1.8% Buddhist, 0.6% New Age, and 3.3% other religions. People who answered that they had no religion were 44.4%, and 5.1% of people did not answer the census question.

Of those at least 15 years old, 603 (30.5%) people had a bachelor's or higher degree, 960 (48.6%) had a post-high school certificate or diploma, and 411 (20.8%) people exclusively held high school qualifications. The median income was $50,100, compared with $41,500 nationally. 228 people (11.6%) earned over $100,000 compared to 12.1% nationally. The employment status of those at least 15 was 1,218 (61.7%) full-time, 252 (12.8%) part-time, and 42 (2.1%) unemployed.

== Education ==
Yaldhurst Model School is a full primary school catering for years 1 to 8. It had a roll of 123 as of March 2026. The school opened in 1876.
