= Broomfield, Christchurch =

Suburb of Christchurch, New Zealand

Broomfield
- Suburb
- Interactive map of Broomfield
- Coordinates: 43.525°S 172.531°E
- Country: New Zealand
- City: Christchurch
- Local authority: Christchurch City Council
- Electoral ward: Hornby
- Community board: Waipuna Halswell-Hornby-Riccarton

Area
  - Land: 100 ha (250 acres)

Population (June 2025)
  - Total: 2,960
  - Density: 3,000/km^{2} (7,700/sq mi)

Yaldhurst	Christchurch Airport	Russley
	Broomfield	Riccarton Park Racecourse
Hei Hei	Hornby

Broomfield is a suburb on the western side of Christchurch, New Zealand.

The suburb is named for an estate farmed by Rev. James Wilson (1813–1886), which he named after a place near Leith in Scotland. The estate was subdivided in 1908, and the suburb was named in the 1970s. Most of the housing has been built since 2010.

State Highway 1 runs through the suburb, and State Highway 73 forms its northwestern boundary.

== Demographics ==
Broomfield covers 1.00 km^{2} (0.39 sq mi). The estimated population was 2,960 as of June 2025, with a population density of 2,960 people per km^{2}.

Historical population
Year	Pop.	±% p.a.
2006	1,839	—
2013	2,046	+1.54%
2018	2,571	+4.67%
2023	2,790	+1.65%

Broomfield had a population of 2,790 in the 2023 New Zealand census, an increase of 219 people (8.5%) since the 2018 census, and an increase of 744 people (36.4%) since the 2013 census. There were 1,362 males, 1,419 females, and 9 people of other genders in 1,068 dwellings. 3.1% of people identified as LGBTIQ+. The median age was 36.9 years (compared with 38.1 years nationally). There were 552 people (19.8%) aged under 15 years, 492 (17.6%) aged 15 to 29, 1,251 (44.8%) aged 30 to 64, and 498 (17.8%) aged 65 or older.

People could identify as more than one ethnicity. The results were 61.9% European (Pākehā); 14.2% Māori; 8.5% Pasifika; 25.9% Asian; 2.6% Middle Eastern, Latin American and African New Zealanders (MELAA); and 2.6% other, which includes people giving their ethnicity as "New Zealander". English was spoken by 94.1%, Māori by 2.6%, Samoan by 2.7%, and other languages by 22.2%. No language could be spoken by 2.4% (e.g. too young to talk). New Zealand Sign Language was known by 0.5%. The percentage of people born overseas was 30.0, compared with 28.8% nationally.

Religious affiliations were 33.7% Christian, 3.1% Hindu, 2.6% Islam, 0.8% Māori religious beliefs, 1.8% Buddhist, 0.4% New Age, and 1.8% other religions. People who answered that they had no religion were 48.9%, and 7.0% of people did not answer the census question.

Of those at least 15 years old, 495 (22.1%) people had a bachelor's or higher degree, 1,053 (47.1%) had a post-high school certificate or diploma, and 687 (30.7%) people exclusively held high school qualifications. The median income was $38,000, compared with $41,500 nationally. 165 people (7.4%) earned over $100,000 compared to 12.1% nationally. The employment status of those at least 15 was 1,092 (48.8%) full-time, 282 (12.6%) part-time, and 66 (2.9%) unemployed.
