= Sockburn, New Zealand =

Suburb of Christchurch, New Zealand

Sockburn
- Suburb
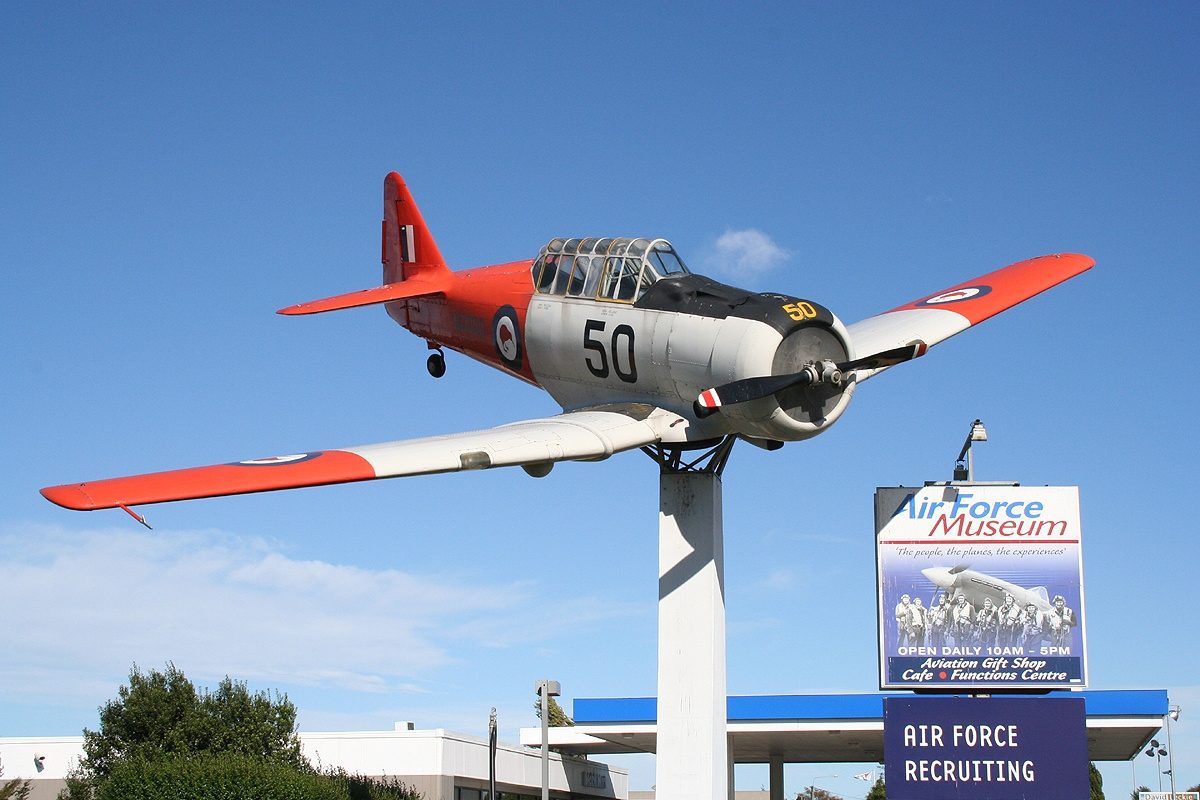
- A former RNZAF North American Harvard mounted outside the Air Force Museum of New Zealand, a prominent feature of Sockburn
- Interactive map of Sockburn
- Coordinates: 43.535°S 172.55°E
- Country: New Zealand
- City: Christchurch
- Local authority: Christchurch City Council
- Electoral ward: Hornby; Riccarton; Hallswell

Area
  - Land: 373 ha (920 acres)

Population (June 2025)
  - Total: 4,680
  - Density: 1,250/km^{2} (3,250/sq mi)

	Avonhead
Hei Hei	Sockburn	Upper Riccarton
Hornby	Wigram

Sockburn is an industrial suburb of Christchurch, New Zealand, located between Hornby and Riccarton, some 7 kilometres (4.3 mi) west of the Christchurch city centre. The suburb is roughly bounded by the triangle formed by State Highway 1 in the west, Main South Road (SH73a) in the south and SH73 in the north. The suburb of Wigram, containing the city's former RNZAF base (now an aviation museum), is located nearby. One of the city's main horseracing circuits, Riccarton Racecourse, is located close to Sockburn's northern edge, and Racecourse was the initial name for the area. The name Sockburn is likely to have come from the village of Sockburn in County Durham, England.

The name of Sockburn is most often currently associated with its role in arterial routes south from the city, with Main South Road (formerly part of State Highway 1) crossing the Sockburn Overbridge and having a major junction at the Sockburn roundabout, where the road splits into two main routes to the city, one extending through the commercial heart of Riccarton, and the other, Blenheim Road, passing to the south through a light industrial area.

== Demographics ==
Sockburn comprises two statistical areas. Sockburn North is residential, and Sockburn South is industrial.

Individual statistical areas
Name	Area (km^{2})	Population	Density (per km^{2})	Dwellings	Median age	Median income
Sockburn North	1.24	4,128	3,329	1,434	39.4 years	$31,500
Sockburn South	2.49	354	142	138	36.8 years	$47,100
New Zealand					38.1 years	$41,500

=== Sockburn North ===
Sockburn North covers 1.24 km^{2} (0.48 sq mi). It had an estimated population of 4,300 as of June 2025, with a population density of 3,468 people per km^{2}.

Historical population for Sockburn North
Year	Pop.	±% p.a.
2006	3,564	—
2013	3,852	+1.12%
2018	4,023	+0.87%
2023	4,128	+0.52%

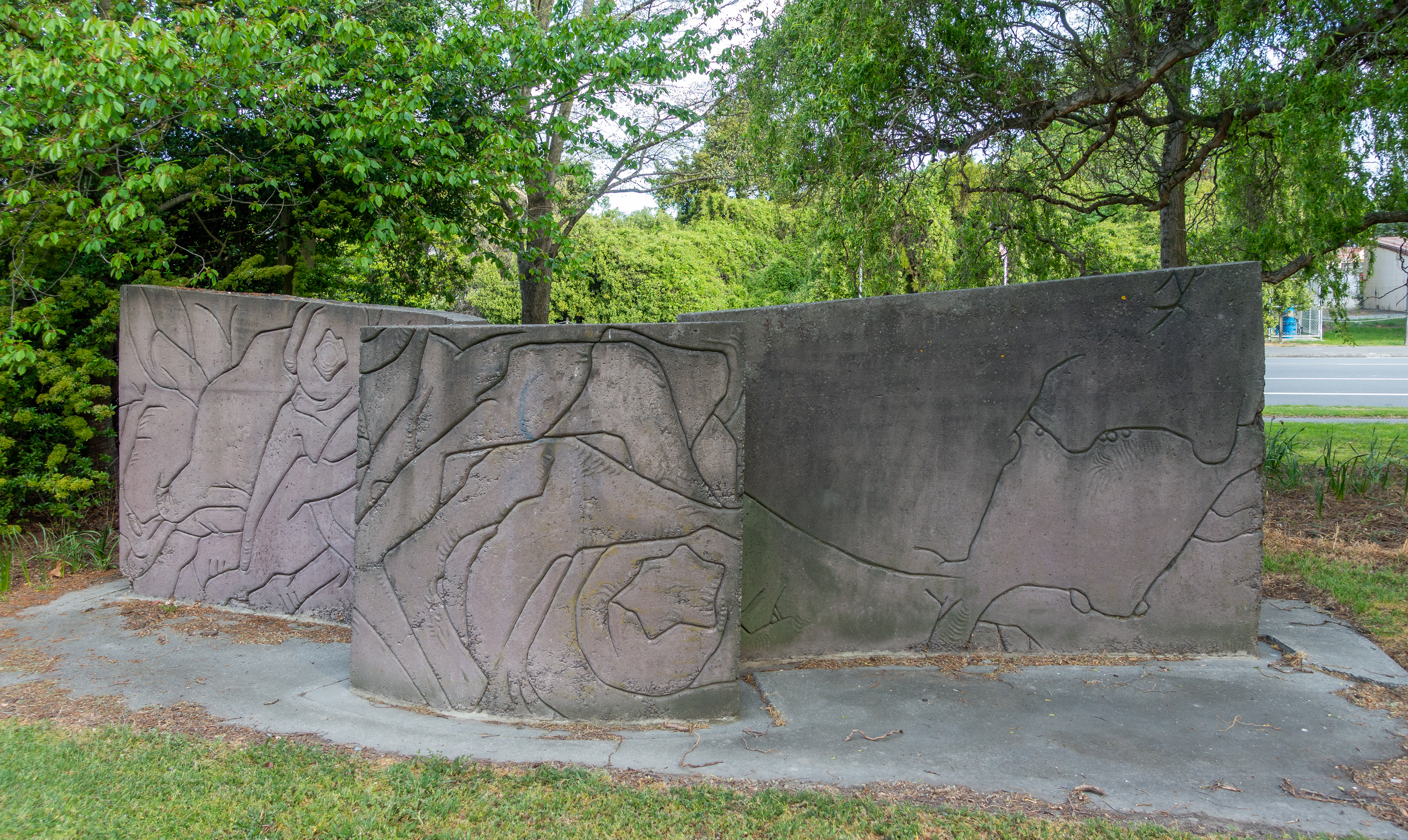
Artwork at Sockburn Park

Sockburn North had a population of 4,128 in the 2023 New Zealand census, an increase of 105 people (2.6%) since the 2018 census, and an increase of 276 people (7.2%) since the 2013 census. There were 2,043 males, 2,061 females, and 21 people of other genders in 1,434 dwellings. 4.1% of people identified as LGBTIQ+. The median age was 39.4 years (compared with 38.1 years nationally). There were 564 people (13.7%) aged under 15 years, 1,020 (24.7%) aged 15 to 29, 1,641 (39.8%) aged 30 to 64, and 897 (21.7%) aged 65 or older.

People could identify as more than one ethnicity. The results were 60.3% European (Pākehā); 7.3% Māori; 4.6% Pasifika; 33.0% Asian; 2.3% Middle Eastern, Latin American and African New Zealanders (MELAA); and 2.9% other, which includes people giving their ethnicity as "New Zealander". English was spoken by 93.8%, Māori by 1.2%, Samoan by 0.9%, and other languages by 26.5%. No language could be spoken by 1.7% (e.g. too young to talk). New Zealand Sign Language was known by 0.7%. The percentage of people born overseas was 38.9, compared with 28.8% nationally.

Religious affiliations were 42.2% Christian, 2.7% Hindu, 2.1% Islam, 0.3% Māori religious beliefs, 1.5% Buddhist, 0.2% New Age, 0.1% Jewish, and 2.2% other religions. People who answered that they had no religion were 43.5%, and 5.2% of people did not answer the census question.

Of those at least 15 years old, 855 (24.0%) people had a bachelor's or higher degree, 1,605 (45.0%) had a post-high school certificate or diploma, and 1,101 (30.9%) people exclusively held high school qualifications. The median income was $31,500, compared with $41,500 nationally. 189 people (5.3%) earned over $100,000 compared to 12.1% nationally. The employment status of those at least 15 was 1,548 (43.4%) full-time, 495 (13.9%) part-time, and 96 (2.7%) unemployed.

=== Sockburn South ===
Sockburn South covers 2.49 km^{2} (0.96 sq mi). It had an estimated population of 380 as of June 2025, with a population density of 153 people per km^{2}.

Historical population for Sockburn South
Year	Pop.	±% p.a.
2006	348	—
2013	345	−0.12%
2018	375	+1.68%
2023	354	−1.15%

Sockburn South had a population of 354 in the 2023 New Zealand census, a decrease of 21 people (−5.6%) since the 2018 census, and an increase of 9 people (2.6%) since the 2013 census. There were 201 males, 153 females, and 3 people of other genders in 138 dwellings. 3.4% of people identified as LGBTIQ+. The median age was 36.8 years (compared with 38.1 years nationally). There were 63 people (17.8%) aged under 15 years, 60 (16.9%) aged 15 to 29, 192 (54.2%) aged 30 to 64, and 36 (10.2%) aged 65 or older.

People could identify as more than one ethnicity. The results were 59.3% European (Pākehā); 16.9% Māori; 4.2% Pasifika; 26.3% Asian; 5.1% Middle Eastern, Latin American and African New Zealanders (MELAA); and 1.7% other, which includes people giving their ethnicity as "New Zealander". English was spoken by 94.9%, Māori by 3.4%, Samoan by 2.5%, and other languages by 22.0%. No language could be spoken by 2.5% (e.g. too young to talk). New Zealand Sign Language was known by 0.8%. The percentage of people born overseas was 33.9, compared with 28.8% nationally.

Religious affiliations were 29.7% Christian, 2.5% Hindu, 1.7% Islam, 3.4% Buddhist, 0.8% New Age, and 2.5% other religions. People who answered that they had no religion were 52.5%, and 5.9% of people did not answer the census question.

Of those at least 15 years old, 60 (20.6%) people had a bachelor's or higher degree, 132 (45.4%) had a post-high school certificate or diploma, and 96 (33.0%) people exclusively held high school qualifications. The median income was $47,100, compared with $41,500 nationally. 12 people (4.1%) earned over $100,000 compared to 12.1% nationally. The employment status of those at least 15 was 177 (60.8%) full-time, 36 (12.4%) part-time, and 9 (3.1%) unemployed.

== Chokebore Lodge ==
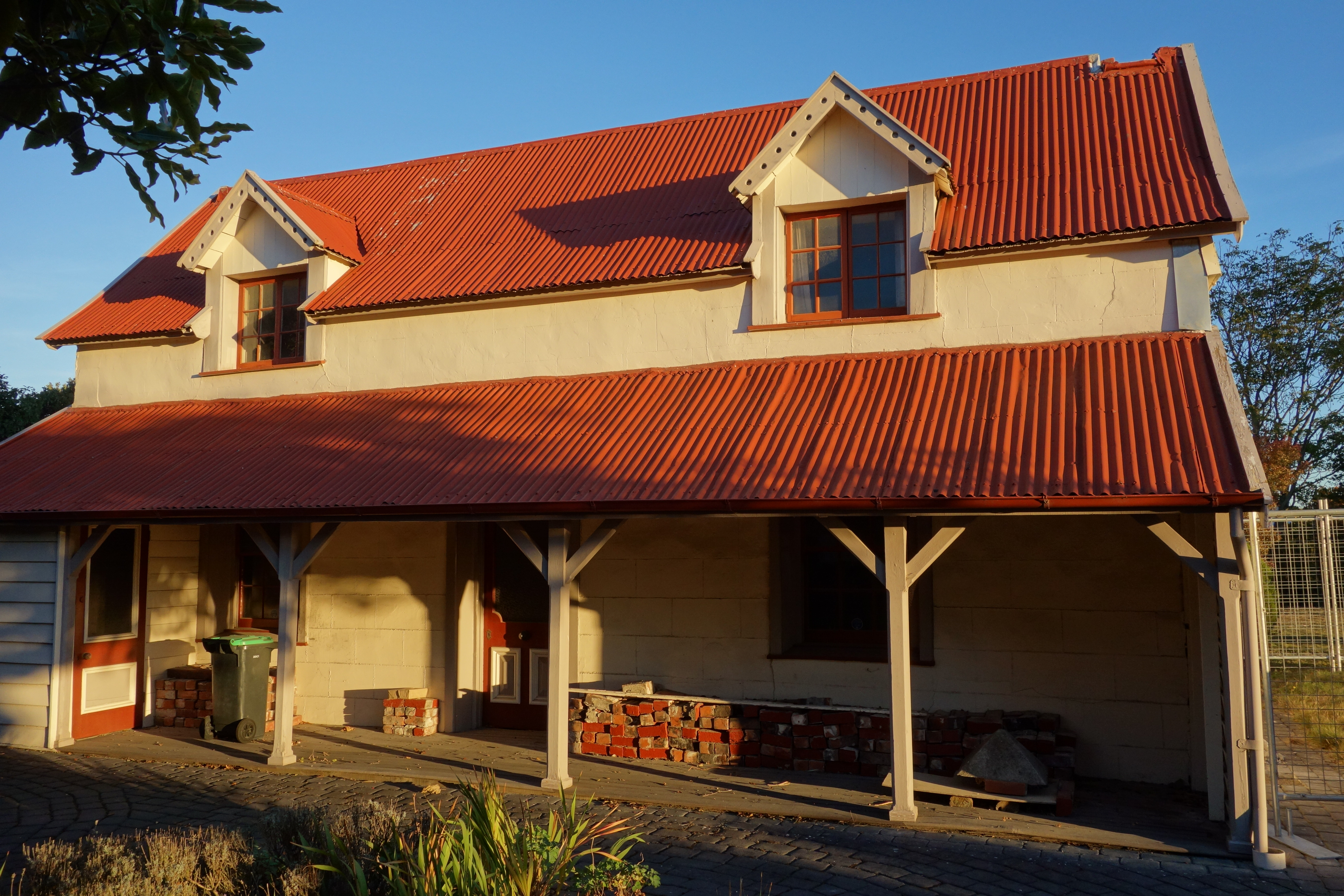
Chokebore Lodge

Chokebore Lodge is a cob cottage built in the late 1850s. It was named by a new owner, Henry Redwood in 1874 after a shotgun type with which he was skilled.

== Education ==
Our Lady of Victories School is a Catholic full primary school catering for years 1 to 8. It had a roll of 254 as of July 2026. The school opened in 1956. The property is listed by Heritage New Zealand.

St Thomas of Canterbury College is a Catholic boys secondary school catering for years 7 to 13. It had a roll of 700 as of July 2026. The school opened in 1961.
