= Yaldhurst Museum =

Museum in New Zealand

Coordinates: 43.510927°S 172.50476°E

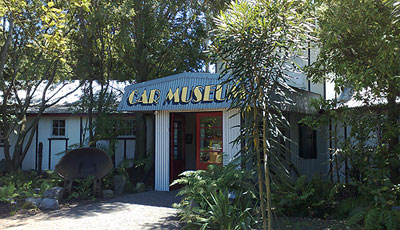
Yaldhurst Museum

The Yaldhurst Museum is located in the suburb of Yaldhurst, Christchurch, New Zealand, close to the Christchurch International Airport, Riccarton Race Course and the Ruapuna Speedway. The museum has a large collection of road transport vehicles, and it opened to the public in 1968.

== History ==
The museum was established by Alfred Thornhill Cooper, also known as Jake Cooper. He began collecting vehicles in 1950 and in 1963 purchased his ancestral home Dudley House at Yaldhurst, to build his museum. The property had a two-story colonial style dwelling built in 1876, two stables and small shed on 8 acres (32,000 m^{2}) of land. Additional display and storage facilities were constructed, and the museum opened to the public on Boxing Day (26 December 1968 (57 years ago). The original name was Yaldhurst Museum of Transport & Science.

== Exhibits ==
Many of the exhibits are displayed in their original condition and include cars, racing cars, commercial vehicles, motorcycles, scooters, power-cycles, horse-drawn carriages, bicycles, tractors, agricultural equipment, stationary engines, military items and fire engines. Also at the museum is the original Yaldhurst School building relocated in April 1984.

== Horse-drawn vehicles ==
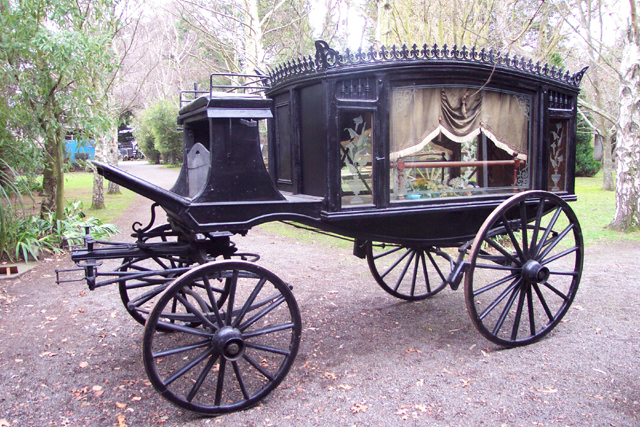
Horse-drawn carriage at the museum

The horse-drawn vehicle collection came from throughout the South Island and comprises 119 vehicles; the oldest is an American buggy of 1810. Examples of gigs, swamp drays, drags, broughams, phaetons, bakers' carts, surreys, expresses, rigs, sociables, governess carts, night carts and milk carts are exhibited. One of the rarest vehicles on display is a c1886 hearse. It was used in Invercargill by funeral directors Macdonald and Weston and is said to have carried the body of New Zealand prime minister Richard Seddon at his death in 1906. The hearse is one of only three known to have survived in New Zealand. The other hearses are held in the Naseby Early Settlers' Museum. Naseby, Otago and the Museum of Transport and Technology (MOTAT), Western Springs, Auckland.

== Cars ==
Yaldhurst Museum has 137 cars, including vehicles such as Austin, Dodge, Singer, Morris, Ford, Triumph, Willys, Plymouth, Jaguar, Wolseley, Chrysler and others. Rarities include a 1938 International car coupe, one of only five bodied in New Zealand, and an early 1908 Daimler. There is a replica fire station housing nine appliances, including a c. 1874 Merryweather manual appliance, a 1924 Leyland 6-cylinder appliance and a 1938 Ford v8 appliance that attended the infamous J. Ballantyne & Co department store fire in Christchurch on 18 November 1947, the worst fire in New Zealand history, when 41 people died.

== Printing ==
The museum print shop houses a significant collection of printing presses and allied equipment. The plant mainly consists of letterpresses and several small offset presses. The most impressive machine is an 1863 Wharfdale flat bed tumble cylinder press requiring two operators. Manufactured by W. Dawson and Sons of Otley, England, this newspaper press was first used in Invercargill about 1863 to print the Southland Times. It was moved to Waimate in 1914 to print the Daily Advertiser. It came to the museum in 1972, where it is still operational and occasionally demonstrated.

== Bibliography ==
- Vercoe, G (1991), Historic Racing Cars of New Zealand, p. 175. ISBN 0-7900-0189-6.
