= Mick Connelly =

New Zealand politician

The Honourable Mick Connelly CMG QSO
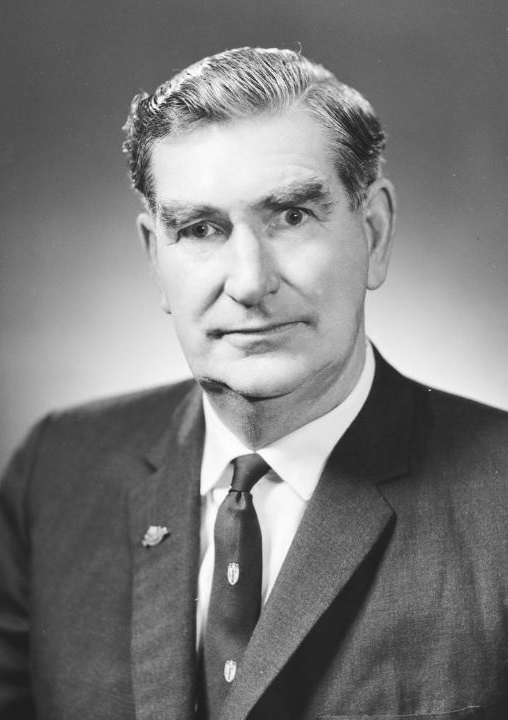
- Connelly in 1969

27th Minister of Works
- In office 13 March 1975 – 12 December 1975
- Prime Minister: Bill Rowling
- Preceded by: Hugh Watt
- Succeeded by: Bill Young

12th Minister of Statistics
- In office 10 September 1974 – 12 December 1975
- Prime Minister: Bill Rowling
- Preceded by: Bill Rowling
- Succeeded by: Peter Wilkinson

21st Minister of Police
- In office 8 December 1972 – 12 December 1975
- Prime Minister: Norman Kirk; Bill Rowling
- Preceded by: Percy Allen
- Succeeded by: Allan McCready

44th Minister of Customs
- In office 8 December 1972 – 13 March 1975
- Prime Minister: Norman Kirk; Bill Rowling
- Preceded by: George Gair
- Succeeded by: Roger Douglas

Member of the New Zealand Parliament
- In office 27 October 1956 – 14 July 1984
- Preceded by: Angus McLagan
- Succeeded by: Margaret Austin
- Constituency: Riccarton (1956–1969); Wigram (1969–1978); Yaldhurst (1978–1984)

Personal details
- Born: 21 February 1916 Wellington, New Zealand
- Died: 27 August 2003 (aged 87) Christchurch, New Zealand
- Party: Labour
- Spouse: Margaret Kennedy
- Relations: Michael Connelly (father)
- Children: 6
- Education: University of Otago
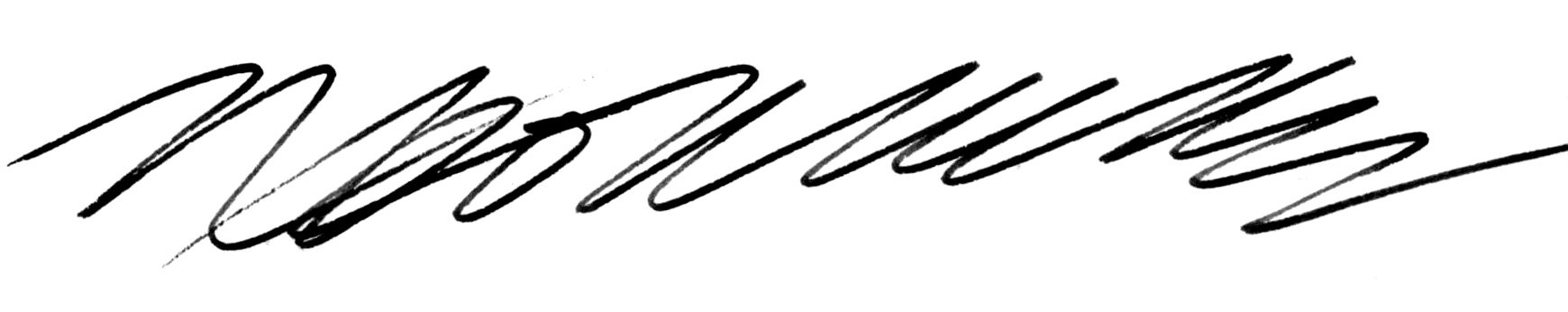
- Signature

Michael Aynsley Connelly CMG QSO (21 February 1916 – 27 August 2003) was a New Zealand politician of the Labour Party, and a Cabinet Minister from 1972 to 1975 in the Third Labour Government.

== Biography ==
=== Early life ===
Connelly was born in Wellington on 21 February 1916. His primary schooling was in Greymouth and later he attended Christian Brothers' High School in Dunedin. He was steeped in unionism and politics from a young age. His father Michael Connelly was a prominent trade unionist, foundation Labour Party member, city councillor and member of the Legislative Council. His mother was the president of the Dunedin women's branch of the Labour Party and wrote articles for several socialist publications. He was politically active himself from a very early age. As a 12-year-old schoolboy, he walked Dunedin streets delivering pamphlets for the Labour Party.

When aged only 16 he won a scholarship to the University of Otago where he studied commerce. During the Great Depression his scholarship expired. He had to halt his studies and had to take a job as a telegraph boy in order to support himself. He married Margaret Kennedy in 1941, with whom he had six children. During World War II he joined the Royal New Zealand Air Force in 1942. He served in a military administration capacity in New Zealand and the Pacific until 1946. After the war ended he resumed his study and graduated Bachelor of Commerce and became a chartered accountant. He then worked for several government departments. He moved to Christchurch taking up a position as an investigating officer with Inland Revenue.

=== Political career ===
New Zealand Parliament
Years	Term	Electorate	Party
1956–1957	31st	Riccarton	Labour
1957–1960	32nd	Riccarton	Labour
1960–1963	33rd	Riccarton	Labour
1963–1966	34th	Riccarton	Labour
1966–1969	35th	Riccarton	Labour
1969–1972	36th	Wigram	Labour
1972–1975	37th	Wigram	Labour
1975–1978	38th	Wigram	Labour
1978–1981	39th	Yaldhurst	Labour
1981–1984	40th	Yaldhurst	Labour

Connelly took active roles in Labour Party organisation and stood for Parliament in St Albans in 1954 but was unsuccessful. Connelly was then elected a member of the Christchurch City Council from 1956 on which he served one term until he was defeated in 1959.

He was the Member of Parliament for Riccarton from the 1956 by-election to 1969 election, then Wigram from 1969 to 1978, then Yaldhurst from 1978 to 1984, when he retired. Connelly was described as New Zealand's last old-fashioned "tubthumping" political campaigner. He conducted much of his electioneering by street-corner orations from the bed of a truck in which he travelled his electorate.

Connelly was noted as a forthright man but also won a reputation for fairness. Former parliamentary colleague Michael Bassett said Connelly appreciated people being straight with him but he never bore grudges. The wide respect with which Connelly garnered led him to become a powerbroker within the Labour caucus according to Bassett. His political philosophy tended towards the conservative, sharing many views with National Party MPs. A son said "he had pulled himself up by his bootstraps and he expected others to do the same. He did not believe in handouts, but in promoting export-led economic development, which would give ordinary people a fair go."

From 1972 to 1975 he was a Cabinet Minister in the Third Labour Government. He was Minister of Police, Minister of Customs, Minister of Statistics (1974–75) and Minister of Works and Development (in 1975). Connelly had a strained relationship with Norman Kirk which stemmed from his support for Arnold Nordmeyer during Kirk's leadership challenge in 1965. It peaked when Kirk announced his seating arrangement in the house when Connelly asked why he had been moved to the second row to which Kirk replied "Because it would have looked too bad to put you in the back row". Eventually their relationship improved after chief whip Henry May revealed to Kirk that Connelly had only nominated Nordmeyer because he had insisted he do so.

He was also Minister in charge of Earthquake and War Damage Commission and Associate Finance Minister. As a minister he exhorted greater consultation with trade unions, to avoid strikes and other industrial strife which he found distasteful. Warren Freer's only criticism of him was his handwriting; "if he wrote you a note it took ages to decipher it".

In opposition after the defeat of the Third Labour Government Connelly initially retained a frontbench seat and held a series of portfolios. From 1975 to 1978 he was Shadow Minister of Social Welfare, from 1978 to 1979 he was Shadow Minister of Foreign Affairs and was Shadow Minister of Defence from 1979 to 1984. When David Lange replaced Bill Rowling Connelly retained the Defence portfolio but was relegated to the backbenches and retired, reluctantly, at the 1984 election. At the 1982 Labour conference Connelly was loudly booed while on the speaking platform when he defended police using batons for defence while speaking against a remit to disband use of riot squads and cease baton use. It was seen as an indignant end to his long political career.

=== Later life ===
Connelly later became chairman of the National Water and Soil Conservation Authority. He advocated for retaining high quality land for farming, surrounding Christchurch with a Green Belt and the creation of a satellite town at Rolleston. Connelly was involved in the establishment of the Canterbury Savings Bank and was its inaugural president. He also served on a host of community bodies, including the councils of both the University of Canterbury and the then Lincoln College.

He was interested in a wide range of sports, especially cricket and racing. In 1977, Connelly was awarded the Queen Elizabeth II Silver Jubilee Medal. He was appointed a Companion of the Queen's Service Order for public services in the 1984 Queen's Birthday Honours. In the 1988 Queen's Birthday Honours, he was made a Companion of the Order of St Michael and St George, for public service. In 1990, he received the New Zealand 1990 Commemoration Medal.

For some time, he was the president of the Association of Former Members of the Parliament of New Zealand. Connelly remarked how he used to enjoy political discussions with National Party members over drinks, knowing that nothing said there would be used later in character assassination in the House. He regretted this was no longer the case in politics. He was for many years a close friend of National Party MP Bert Walker and one of his sons, John, stood for National in Yaldhurst in 1990.

Connelly died on 27 August 2003 aged 87. He was survived by his wife, four sons, two daughters and multiple grandchildren and great-grandchildren.

== Notes ==
Political offices
Preceded by George Gair	Minister of Customs; 1972–1975	Succeeded by Roger Douglas
Preceded by Percy Allen	Minister of Police; 1972–1975	Succeeded by Allan McCready
Preceded by Bill Rowling	Minister of Statistics; 1974–1975	Succeeded by Peter Wilkinson
Preceded by Hugh Watt	Minister of Works; 1975	Succeeded by Bill Young
New Zealand Parliament
Preceded by Angus McLagan	Member of Parliament for Riccarton; 1956–1969	Succeeded by Eric Holland
New constituency	Member of Parliament for Wigram; 1969–1978	Vacant Constituency abolished, recreated in 1996 Title next held by Jim Anderton
New constituency	Member of Parliament for Yaldhurst; 1978–1984	Succeeded by Margaret Austin
