= Margaret Austin =

New Zealand politician

The Honourable Margaret Austin CNZM CRSNZ
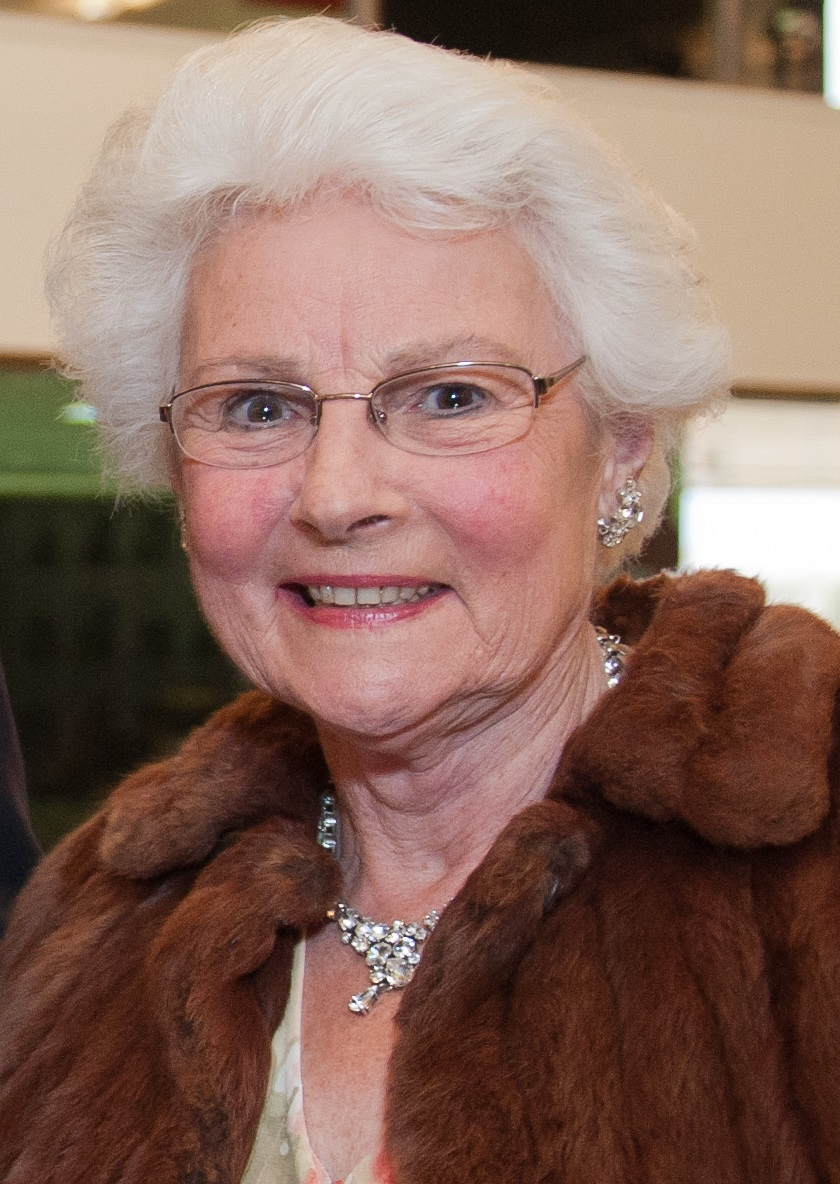
- Austin in 2012

23rd Minister of Internal Affairs
- In office 9 February 1990 – 2 November 1990
- Prime Minister: David Lange; Geoffrey Palmer
- Preceded by: Michael Bassett
- Succeeded by: Graeme Lee

Member of the New Zealand Parliament for Yaldhurst
- In office 14 July 1984 – 12 October 1996
- Preceded by: Mick Connelly
- Succeeded by: Constituency abolished

Personal details
- Born: Margaret Elizabeth Leonard; 1 April 1933 (age 93) Dunedin, New Zealand
- Party: Labour; United
- Profession: Teacher

Margaret Elizabeth Austin CNZM CRSNZ (née Leonard; born 1 April 1933) is a former New Zealand politician. She was an MP from 1984 to 1996, representing first the Labour Party and then briefly United New Zealand.

== Life ==
=== Early life, family and career ===
Austin was born in Dunedin on 1 April 1933, and was educated at St Dominic's College, Dunedin, and Sacred Heart College, Christchurch. She studied at Canterbury University College and Christchurch Teachers' College, and graduated with a Bachelor of Science in 1953 and a Diploma of Teaching in 1954. She went on to teach in Christchurch and in 1970 became the head of science at Christchurch Girls' High School and later became senior mistress at Riccarton High School in 1977. She was also a member of the Educational Administration Society and was its president for three years.

In 1955, she married John Austin, and the couple went on to have three children.

=== Political career ===
New Zealand Parliament
Years	Term	Electorate	Party
1984–1987	41st	Yaldhurst	Labour
1987–1990	42nd	Yaldhurst	Labour
1990–1993	43rd	Yaldhurst	Labour
1993–1995	44th	Yaldhurst	Labour
1995–1996	Changed allegiance to:		United NZ

She was first elected to Parliament in the 1984 election as the MP for Yaldhurst, an electorate in western Christchurch. After Labour's re-election at the 1987 election, Austin was elected her party's Senior Whip following Michael Cullen's elevation to cabinet.

During her time in Parliament, Austin served as a Minister of Research and Development, Internal Affairs and of Arts, Culture and Heritage at the end of the Fourth Labour Government. In November 1990, when Labour was in opposition, she was appointed as Shadow Minister of Education by Labour leader Mike Moore.

She held the Yaldhurst seat for the Labour Party until 1995 when the seat was abolished, in preparation for the changeover to MMP, and she joined with six other MPs to found the centrist United New Zealand Party. Like all United New Zealand MPs (but Peter Dunne), Austin was not re-elected in the 1996 election; Austin stood in the new Ilam electorate where she came third.

=== Later activities ===
She later became Chancellor of Lincoln University from 2000 to 2005. From the late 1990s until about 2011, she worked for the United Nations Educational Scientific and Cultural Organisation (UNESCO). From 2000 to 2007, she was president of the chairs of UNESCO national commissions worldwide. She also has an interest in astronomy, leading the project for the Aoraki-Mackenzie International Dark Sky Reserve.

== Honours and awards ==
Austin was awarded the New Zealand 1990 Commemoration Medal, and in 1993, she was awarded the New Zealand Suffrage Centennial Medal.

In the 1997 Queen's Birthday Honours, Austin was appointed a Member of the New Zealand Order of Merit, for public services. In the 2008 New Year Honours, she was elevated to Companion of the New Zealand Order of Merit, for services to the community.

Austin has been elected as a Companion of the Royal Society of New Zealand.

== Notes ==
Political offices
Preceded by Michael Bassett	Minister of Internal Affairs; 1990	Succeeded by Graeme Lee
Preceded by Bob Tizard	Minister for Science and Technology; 1990	Succeeded by Simon Upton
New Zealand Parliament
Preceded by Mick Connelly	Member of Parliament for Yaldhurst; 1984–1996	Constituency abolished
Party political offices
Preceded by Michael Cullen	Senior Whip of the Labour Party; 1987–1990	Succeeded by Trevor Mallard
