= Avonhead =

Suburb of Christchurch, New Zealand

- Suburb
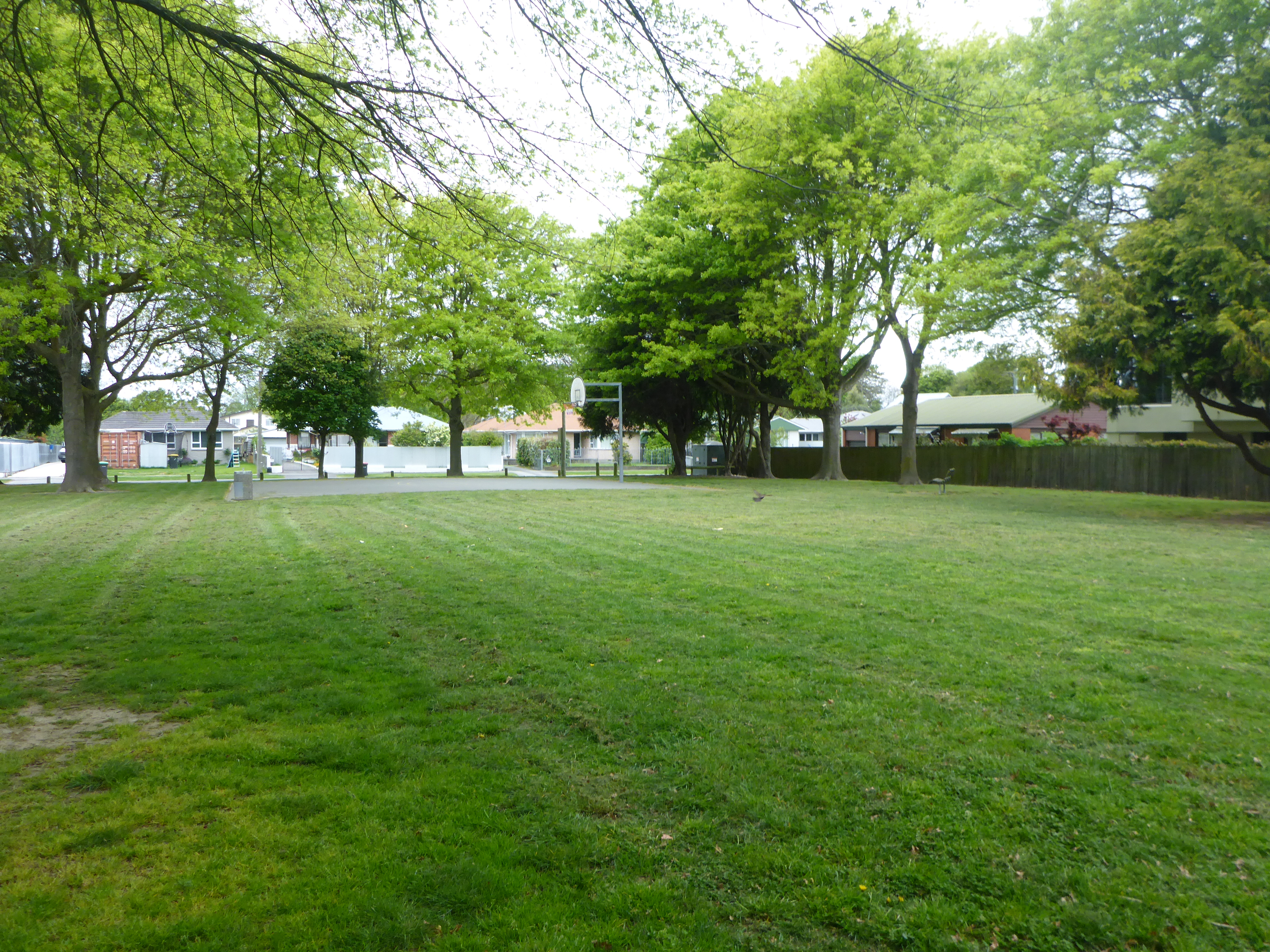
- Staveley Reserve
- Interactive map of Avonhead
- Coordinates: 43.510°S 172.557°E
- Country: New Zealand
- City: Christchurch
- Local authority: Christchurch City Council
- Electoral ward: Waimairi
- Community board: Waimāero Fendalton-Waimairi-Harewood

Area
  - Land: 425 ha (1,050 acres)

Population (June 2025)
  - Total: 10,650
  - Density: 2,510/km^{2} (6,490/sq mi)

| | Burnside |
| Russley | Avonhead | Ilam |
| | Sockburn | Upper Riccarton |

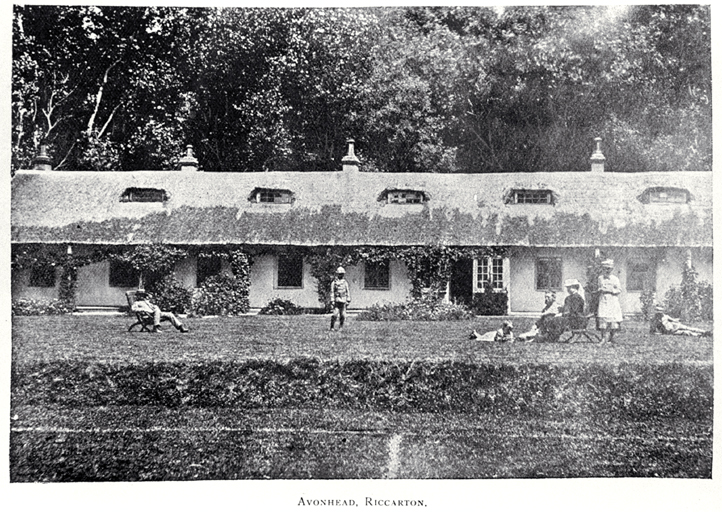
The former Avonhead homestead in the 1890s

Avonhead is a suburb of the New Zealand city of Christchurch. It has two primary schools, a shopping centre and several parks.

== Etymology ==
Engineer William Bayley Bray (1812–1885) arrived in Canterbury in January 1851 on the Duke of Bronte and built a homestead at the head of the Avon River / Ōtākaro in an area with many springs, and he thus called it Avonhead. The area itself was referred to as Avonwood in early records, but Avonhead became the common term and this was formally adopted by the Waimairi County Council 1959.

== Demographics ==
Avonhead covers 4.25 km^{2} (1.64 sq mi). It had an estimated population of 10,650 as of June 2025, with a population density of 2,506 people per km^{2}.

Historical population
| Year | Pop. | ±% p.a. |
|---|---|---|
| 2006 | 8,946 | — |
| 2013 | 8,937 | −0.01% |
| 2018 | 9,396 | +1.01% |
| 2023 | 9,927 | +1.11% |
The 2006 population is for a smaller area of 3.11 km^{2}. Source:

Avonhead had a population of 9,927 in the 2023 New Zealand census, an increase of 531 people (5.7%) since the 2018 census, and an increase of 990 people (11.1%) since the 2013 census. There were 4,947 males, 4,941 females, and 39 people of other genders in 3,573 dwellings. 3.7% of people identified as LGBTIQ+. The median age was 40.0 years (compared with 38.1 years nationally). There were 1,647 people (16.6%) aged under 15 years, 2,088 (21.0%) aged 15 to 29, 4,149 (41.8%) aged 30 to 64, and 2,040 (20.6%) aged 65 or older.

People could identify as more than one ethnicity. The results were 65.2% European (Pākehā); 6.2% Māori; 3.2% Pasifika; 30.3% Asian; 2.5% Middle Eastern, Latin American and African New Zealanders (MELAA); and 2.2% other, which includes people giving their ethnicity as "New Zealander". English was spoken by 94.0%, Māori by 1.1%, Samoan by 0.8%, and other languages by 28.6%. No language could be spoken by 1.7% (e.g. too young to talk). New Zealand Sign Language was known by 0.4%. The percentage of people born overseas was 37.1, compared with 28.8% nationally.

Religious affiliations were 36.6% Christian, 1.8% Hindu, 1.8% Islam, 1.9% Buddhist, 0.3% New Age, 0.1% Jewish, and 1.4% other religions. People who answered that they had no religion were 50.6%, and 5.7% of people did not answer the census question.

Of those at least 15 years old, 2,829 (34.2%) people had a bachelor's or higher degree, 3,675 (44.4%) had a post-high school certificate or diploma, and 1,776 (21.4%) people exclusively held high school qualifications. The median income was $37,900, compared with $41,500 nationally. 927 people (11.2%) earned over $100,000 compared to 12.1% nationally. The employment status of those at least 15 was 3,822 (46.2%) full-time, 1,254 (15.1%) part-time, and 183 (2.2%) unemployed.

Individual statistical areas
| Name | Area (km^{2}) | Population | Density (per km^{2}) | Dwellings | Median age | Median income |
|---|---|---|---|---|---|---|
| Avonhead North | 1.35 | 1,896 | 1,404 | 726 | 50.8 years | $37,100 |
| Avonhead West | 1.04 | 1,935 | 1,861 | 684 | 44.4 years | $35,800 |
| Avonhead East | 0.84 | 2,814 | 3,350 | 948 | 35.1 years | $39,000 |
| Avonhead South | 1.03 | 3,285 | 3,189 | 1,218 | 36.6 years | $38,400 |
| New Zealand | | | | | 38.1 years | $41,500 |

== Economy ==
=== Retail ===
Avonhead Mall opened in Avonhead in the 1960s. It covers an area of 3,876 m^{2} and has 166 carparks. There are 13 retailers, including a Woolworths supermarket.

== Parks ==
Major parks include Avonhead Park, Crosbie Park, Hyde Park, Ferrier Park and Burnside Park. There are various smaller reserves such as Stewarts Bush, Cricklewood Reserve, Westgrove Park, Staveley Reserve, Brigadoon Reserve, Bullock Reserve and Strathean Reserve.

== Schools ==
=== Avonhead School - Rakipaoa ===
Avonhead School - Rakipaoa

Location
- 55 Avonhead Rd, Avonhead, Christchurch 8042, New Zealand; 43°31′26.77″S 172°33′34.189″E

Information
- Motto: Growing Excellence Together – Piki ake te tihi ngātahi
- Ministry of Education Institution no.: 3287
- Principal: Micah Hocquard
- Enrolment: 591 students as of July 2026
- Website: avonhead.school.nz

Avonhead School - Rakipaoa is a full primary school (years 1–8, or ages 5–13) within Avonhead, located between Ferrier park to the West and Avonhead Road to the East. The school has 591 students as of July 2026. Although located within Avonhead, the school zone also includes sections of the nearby suburbs of Ilam and Sockburn. Most students from Avonhead School go on to secondary schooling at Riccarton High School or Burnside High School. It opened in 1959 as Avonhead Primary School. The school currently has 22 classrooms, a result of construction work undertaken to address issues of overcrowding which had been previously faced. These were accompanied by additional work on school facilities, including the construction of a new school hall, basketball and netball courts, which had been made necessary by the construction of classrooms on the sites of previous courts.

Between 2021 and 2022 the senior playground was demolished and replaced with a hockey court with a temporary playground being constructed on the north side of the HQ which was replaced by a permanent new senior playground in June 2022. In the same year, there were also new crawling tunnels constructed near the junior playground replacing a birch tree.

=== Merrin School Ngā Whetū Kohara ===
Located next to the Avonhead Mall, Merrin School Ngā Whetū Kohara has a roll of 454 students as of July 2026. Merrin is a full primary school, educating years 1 to 8. As the entirety of the school's zone is covered by Burnside High School, the majority of students go on to learn there. Merrin opened in 1966. The school is in the planning stage of the Christchurch Schools Rebuild Programme.
