= Russley =

Suburb of Christchurch, New Zealand

- Suburb
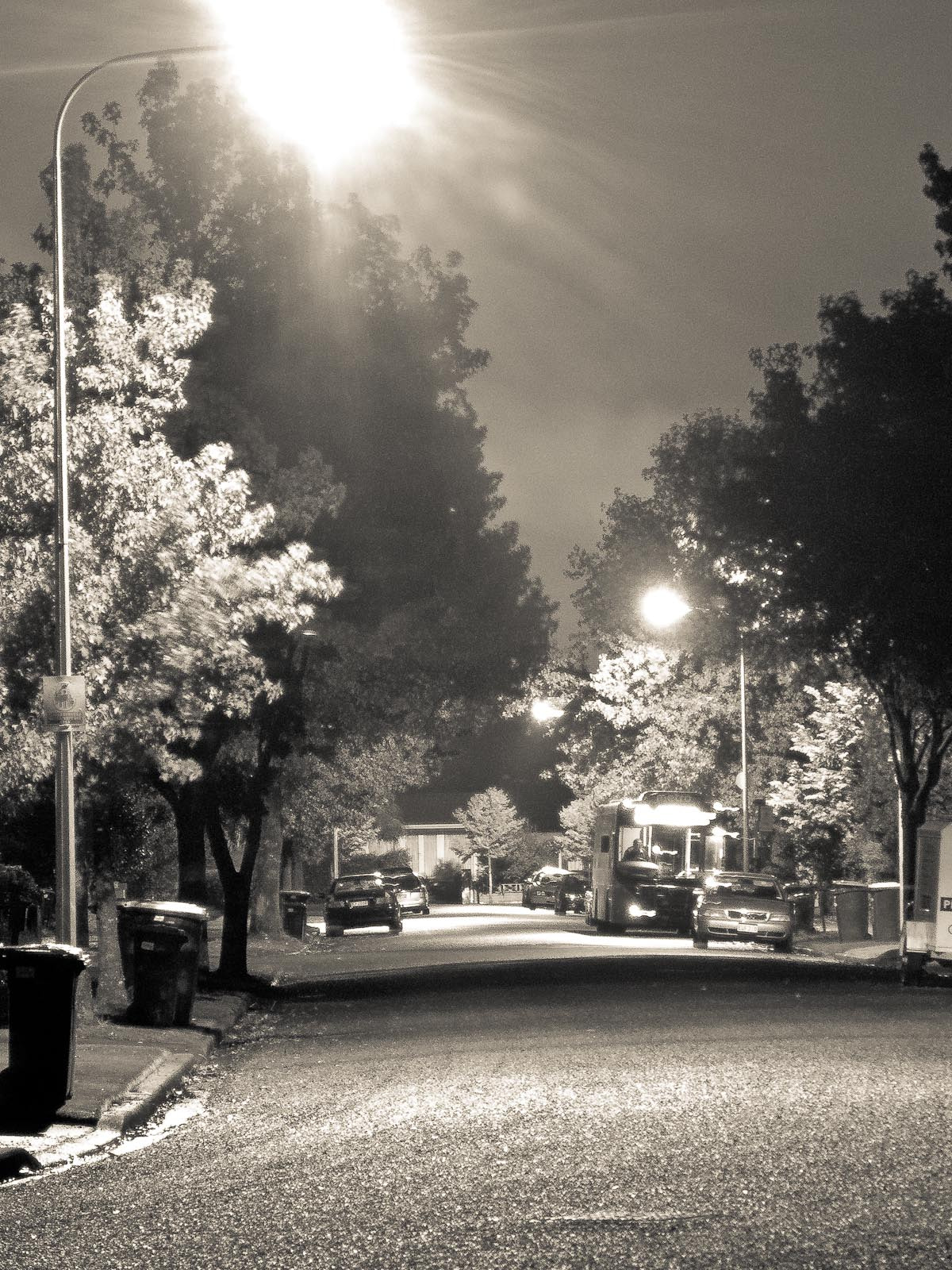
- Karnak Crescent
- Interactive map of Russley
- Coordinates: 43.518°S 172.540°E
- Country: New Zealand
- City: Christchurch
- Local authority: Christchurch City Council
- Electoral ward: Waimairi
- Community board: Waimāero Fendalton-Waimairi-Harewood

Area
  - Land: 75 ha (190 acres)

Population (June 2025)
  - Total: 2,440
  - Density: 3,300/km^{2} (8,400/sq mi)

	Christchurch Airport
Yaldhurst	Russley	Avonhead
Broomfield		Riccarton Park Racecourse

Russley is a suburb on the western side of Christchurch city.

The suburb is named after Russley Farm, which was owned by William Chisnell (1827–1876) but sold shortly before his death.

== Demographics ==
Russley covers 0.75 km^{2} (0.29 sq mi). It had an estimated population of 2,440 as of June 2025, with a population density of 3,253 people per km^{2}.

Historical population
Year	Pop.	±% p.a.
2006	2,442	—
2013	2,337	−0.63%
2018	2,343	+0.05%
2023	2,325	−0.15%
The 2006 population is for a larger area of 1.89 km^{2}. Source:

Russley had a population of 2,325 in the 2023 New Zealand census, a decrease of 18 people (−0.8%) since the 2018 census, and a decrease of 12 people (−0.5%) since the 2013 census. There were 1,143 males, 1,158 females, and 21 people of other genders in 876 dwellings. 3.7% of people identified as LGBTIQ+. The median age was 38.2 years (compared with 38.1 years nationally). There were 414 people (17.8%) aged under 15 years, 489 (21.0%) aged 15 to 29, 1,029 (44.3%) aged 30 to 64, and 390 (16.8%) aged 65 or older.

People could identify as more than one ethnicity. The results were 69.7% European (Pākehā); 8.4% Māori; 5.4% Pasifika; 22.2% Asian; 3.0% Middle Eastern, Latin American and African New Zealanders (MELAA); and 2.3% other, which includes people giving their ethnicity as "New Zealander". English was spoken by 95.2%, Māori by 1.8%, Samoan by 1.9%, and other languages by 21.3%. No language could be spoken by 2.2% (e.g. too young to talk). New Zealand Sign Language was known by 0.6%. The percentage of people born overseas was 31.2, compared with 28.8% nationally.

Religious affiliations were 35.6% Christian, 2.7% Hindu, 1.4% Islam, 0.1% Māori religious beliefs, 0.8% Buddhist, 0.3% New Age, and 1.7% other religions. People who answered that they had no religion were 50.3%, and 6.8% of people did not answer the census question.

Of those at least 15 years old, 552 (28.9%) people had a bachelor's or higher degree, 969 (50.7%) had a post-high school certificate or diploma, and 390 (20.4%) people exclusively held high school qualifications. The median income was $40,700, compared with $41,500 nationally. 177 people (9.3%) earned over $100,000 compared to 12.1% nationally. The employment status of those at least 15 was 954 (49.9%) full-time, 285 (14.9%) part-time, and 33 (1.7%) unemployed.

== Education ==
Russley School Te Paritō Kōwhai is a full primary school catering for years 1 to 8. It had a roll of 425 as of July 2026. The school opened in 1963.
