= Hornby, New Zealand =

Suburb of Christchurch, New Zealand

Hornby
- Suburb
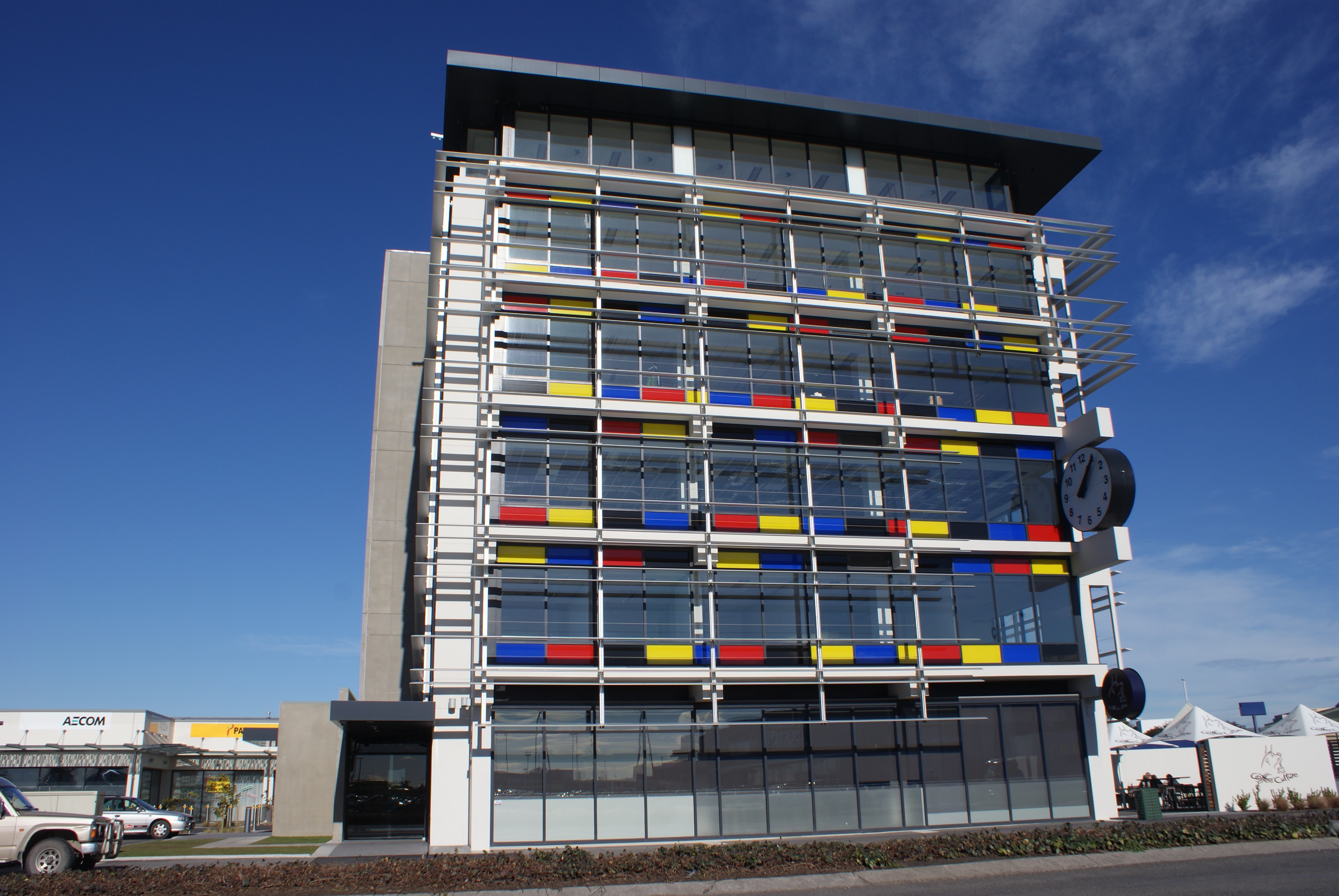
- The Hornby Clocktower building in 2011, a landmark of the suburb prior to its demolition in 2014
- Interactive map of Hornby
- Coordinates: 43°33′S 172°32′E
- Country: New Zealand
- City: Christchurch
- Local authority: Christchurch City Council
- Electoral ward: Hornby
- Community board: Waipuna Halswell-Hornby-Riccarton

Area
  - Land: 1,199 ha (2,960 acres)

Population (June 2025)
  - Total: 8,760
  - Density: 731/km^{2} (1,890/sq mi)

	Hei Hei	Sockburn
Islington	Hornby	Wigram
	Prebbleton	Aidanfield

Hornby is a residential and retail suburb at the western edge of Christchurch, New Zealand. The suburb is directly connected to other parts of Christchurch and the South Island by a number of main arterial routes, including State Highway 1 and the Christchurch Southern Motorway.

== History ==
=== European settlement ===
During the early stages of European settlement, Hornby was originally referred to as Southbridge Junction – with the junction acting as the start of the main road south.

Due to rising confusion with the nearby town of Southbridge, a decision was made to rename the area to Hornby in 1878, although the origins of this name are unclear. One explanation holds that the suburb was named after Hornby-with-Farleton in Lancashire by Frederick William Delamain, who came to Christchurch from England in 1852. Delamain owned a nearby homestead, which gave its name to the nearby suburb of Yaldhurst, and was a prominent figure in the area during the latter half of the 19th century. Another version suggests that the name refers to Geoffrey Hornby, who was the Admiral of the British flying squadron and who visited Christchurch in 1870, just prior to the suburb being renamed on 2 September 1878.

=== Modern history ===
In 1922, the suburb was chosen by Kempthorne Prosser to be the location for a new super-phosphate plant, used to develop fertiliser. The plant was the company's first in Christchurch and third overall, developed in response to an 1881 incentive from the New Zealand government to facilitate the construction of a local fertiliser industry. This fertiliser plant remains in operation, and is now run by Ravensdown limited, which bought Kempthorne Prosser in 1978. The plant was the location of a large fire in 2018, which prompted nearby evacuations in fear of an explosion and caused thick black smoke to be visible across the region.

Prior to the development of adjacent suburbs such as Wigram, Hornby's isolation from the rest of Christchurch as a result of Wigram Aerodrome and the industrial estates of Sockburn led to it occasionally being considered a town in its own right, however officially it has always been a suburb of Christchurch. Hornby is home to a velodrome and a BMX track. In the past, it has been the location for "Westside Party in the Park", a free Christmas concert.

In April 2024, a new community centre and swimming pool facility opened. It is called the Matatiki Hornby Centre.

== Demographics ==
Hornby comprised five statistical areas in 2012. It covers 11.99 km^{2} (4.63 sq mi) and had an estimated population of 8,760 as of June 2025, with a population density of 731 people per km^{2}.

Individual statistical areas
Name	Area (km^{2})	Population	Density (per km^{2})	Dwellings	Median age	Median income
Hornby Central	2.27	123	54	48	42.1 years	$45,400
Hornby West	0.74	2,472	3,341	918	37.8 years	$40,400
Hornby South	0.93	3,123	3,358	1,230	36.1 years	$40,100
Branston	0.78	2,064	2,646	711	34.0 years	$43,500
Islington-Hornby Industrial	7.27	354	49	144	51.3 years	$37,500
New Zealand					38.1 years	$41,500

=== Commercial area ===
The Hornby Central statistical area covers 2.27 km^{2} (0.88 sq mi) on the north side of Hornby. It had an estimated population of 130 as of June 2025, with a population density of 57 people per km^{2}.

Historical population for Hornby Central
Year	Pop.	±% p.a.
2006	156	—
2013	120	−3.68%
2018	135	+2.38%
2023	123	−1.84%

Hornby Central had a population of 123 in the 2023 New Zealand census, a decrease of 12 people (−8.9%) since the 2018 census, and an increase of 3 people (2.5%) since the 2013 census. There were 69 males, 54 females, and 3 people of other genders in 48 dwellings. 4.9% of people identified as LGBTIQ+. The median age was 42.1 years (compared with 38.1 years nationally). There were 18 people (14.6%) aged under 15 years, 24 (19.5%) aged 15 to 29, 66 (53.7%) aged 30 to 64, and 15 (12.2%) aged 65 or older.

People could identify as more than one ethnicity. The results were 58.5% European (Pākehā); 14.6% Māori; 4.9% Pasifika; 29.3% Asian; and 7.3% Middle Eastern, Latin American and African New Zealanders (MELAA). English was spoken by 100.0%, Māori by 4.9%, and other languages by 22.0%. No language could be spoken by 2.4% (e.g. too young to talk). The percentage of people born overseas was 31.7, compared with 28.8% nationally.

Religious affiliations were 34.1% Christian, 2.4% Māori religious beliefs, and 4.9% Buddhist. People who answered that they had no religion were 48.8%, and 9.8% of people did not answer the census question.

Of those at least 15 years old, 18 (17.1%) people had a bachelor's or higher degree, 51 (48.6%) had a post-high school certificate or diploma, and 33 (31.4%) people exclusively held high school qualifications. The median income was $45,400, compared with $41,500 nationally. 6 people (5.7%) earned over $100,000 compared to 12.1% nationally. The employment status of those at least 15 was 60 (57.1%) full-time, 12 (11.4%) part-time, and 6 (5.7%) unemployed.

=== Residential Hornby ===
The residential areas of Hornby, comprising the statistical areas of Hornby West, Hornby South and Branston, cover 2.45 km^{2} (0.95 sq mi) and had an estimated population of 8,260 as of June 2025, with a population density of 3,371 people per km^{2}.

Historical population for residential areas
Year	Pop.	±% p.a.
2006	6,303	—
2013	7,200	+1.92%
2018	7,479	+0.76%
2023	7,659	+0.48%
The 2006 population is for a smaller area of 2.11 km^{2}. Source:

The residential areas had a population of 7,659 in the 2023 New Zealand census, an increase of 180 people (2.4%) since the 2018 census, and an increase of 459 people (6.4%) since the 2013 census. There were 3,909 males, 3,723 females, and 24 people of other genders in 2,859 dwellings. 3.8% of people identified as LGBTIQ+. There were 1,338 people (17.5%) aged under 15 years, 1,647 (21.5%) aged 15 to 29, 3,495 (45.6%) aged 30 to 64, and 1,182 (15.4%) aged 65 or older.

People could identify as more than one ethnicity. The results were 64.8% European (Pākehā); 14.5% Māori; 7.1% Pasifika; 25.1% Asian; 1.1% Middle Eastern, Latin American and African New Zealanders (MELAA); and 2.2% other, which includes people giving their ethnicity as "New Zealander". English was spoken by 94.4%, Māori by 2.7%, Samoan by 2.5%, and other languages by 17.2%. No language could be spoken by 2.8% (e.g. too young to talk). New Zealand Sign Language was known by 0.7%. The percentage of people born overseas was 29.1, compared with 28.8% nationally.

Religious affiliations were 34.6% Christian, 2.6% Hindu, 1.4% Islam, 0.5% Māori religious beliefs, 1.3% Buddhist, 0.4% New Age, and 2.1% other religions. People who answered that they had no religion were 49.6%, and 7.4% of people did not answer the census question.

Of those at least 15 years old, 954 (15.1%) people had a bachelor's or higher degree, 3,198 (50.6%) had a post-high school certificate or diploma, and 2,178 (34.5%) people exclusively held high school qualifications. 237 people (3.7%) earned over $100,000 compared to 12.1% nationally. The employment status of those at least 15 was 3,387 (53.6%) full-time, 711 (11.2%) part-time, and 201 (3.2%) unemployed.

=== Islington-Hornby Industrial area ===
The Islington-Hornby Industrial area covers 7.27 km^{2} (2.81 sq mi) to the south of Hornby. It had an estimated population of 370 as of June 2025, with a population density of 51 people per km^{2}.

Historical population for Islington-Hornby Industrial
Year	Pop.	±% p.a.
2006	417	—
2013	381	−1.28%
2018	342	−2.14%
2023	354	+0.69%
The 2006 population is for a smaller area of 7.18 km^{2}. Source:

Islington-Hornby Industrial had a population of 354 in the 2023 New Zealand census, an increase of 12 people (3.5%) since the 2018 census, and a decrease of 27 people (−7.1%) since the 2013 census. There were 198 males, 156 females, and 3 people of other genders in 144 dwellings. 3.4% of people identified as LGBTIQ+. The median age was 51.3 years (compared with 38.1 years nationally). There were 39 people (11.0%) aged under 15 years, 48 (13.6%) aged 15 to 29, 195 (55.1%) aged 30 to 64, and 75 (21.2%) aged 65 or older.

People could identify as more than one ethnicity. The results were 71.2% European (Pākehā), 13.6% Māori, 5.9% Pasifika, 16.9% Asian, and 4.2% other, which includes people giving their ethnicity as "New Zealander". English was spoken by 97.5%, Māori by 1.7%, Samoan by 2.5%, and other languages by 9.3%. No language could be spoken by 0.8% (e.g. too young to talk). New Zealand Sign Language was known by 0.8%. The percentage of people born overseas was 23.7, compared with 28.8% nationally.

Religious affiliations were 39.8% Christian, 0.8% Hindu, 1.7% Islam, 0.8% Māori religious beliefs, 0.8% New Age, and 1.7% other religions. People who answered that they had no religion were 49.2%, and 4.2% of people did not answer the census question.

Of those at least 15 years old, 27 (8.6%) people had a bachelor's or higher degree, 168 (53.3%) had a post-high school certificate or diploma, and 123 (39.0%) people exclusively held high school qualifications. The median income was $37,500, compared with $41,500 nationally. 9 people (2.9%) earned over $100,000 compared to 12.1% nationally. The employment status of those at least 15 was 171 (54.3%) full-time, 21 (6.7%) part-time, and 12 (3.8%) unemployed.

== Transport ==
Hornby is located on an important road junction on State Highway 1, where southbound traffic turns sharply west, continuing towards to Dunedin and other points south. Northbound connects to Picton via the Christchurch International Airport. This junction also connects traffic to the nearby suburbs of Sockburn and Riccarton towards the central city, and south to the Christchurch Southern Motorway, which forms part of State Highway 76.

== Economy ==
=== Retail ===
Hornby contains two large retail malls, located either side of State Highway 1 to the west of the main junction.

The Hub Hornby opened in 1976. It has a lettable area of 4,000 m^{2}. It has more than 800 carparks and 82 tenants, including Pak'nSave and Farmers.

Outlet mall Dress Smart Christchurch opened to the south in 1999. Following an expansion in 2005, it covers 7,117 m^{2}, with 53 stores and 347 carparks.

== Sport ==
The Hornby area contains many sports clubs. These include : Hornby Netball Club, Christchurch Junior Cricket Association, Hornby Soccer, Westside Sports Club, Hornby Touch Club, ISL Hornby Women's Football Club, Burnham Golf Club, Hornby Working Men's Club and Pegasus Cycling Club.

== Education ==
Hornby High School is a secondary school for years 7 to 13 with a roll of 1,022 students. The school opened in 1975.

Te Māhuri Mānuka Hornby Primary School and Te Manu Tukutuku South Hornby School are contributing primary schools catering for years 1 to 6. They have rolls of 257 and 306, respectively. Hornby Primary opened in 1895. Hornby South School opened in 1962 and was renamed South Hornby School in 1966. It was gifted the name Te Manu Tukutuku in 2016. It moved to its current location in 2017 in new buildings replacing the earthquake-damaged Branston Intermediate School.

All these schools are coeducational. Rolls are as of July 2026.
