= Hei Hei =

Suburb of Christchurch, New Zealand

- Suburb
- Interactive map of Hei Hei
- Coordinates: 43.533°S 172.526°E
- Country: New Zealand
- City: Christchurch
- Local authority: Christchurch City Council
- Electoral ward: Hornby
- Community board: Waipuna Halswell-Hornby-Riccarton

Area
  - Land: 124 ha (310 acres)

Population (June 2025)
  - Total: 3,720
  - Density: 3,000/km^{2} (7,770/sq mi)

	Broomfield
	Hei Hei	Sockburn
Islington	Hornby	Wigram

Hei Hei is a suburb of Christchurch, New Zealand. It is located in the west of Christchurch 11 kilometres (6.8 mi) from the central city, and is bisected by State Highway 1. The area was subdivided for poultry farming after World War I for returning serviceman, but the venture failed due to the poor soil conditions. The place name is related to the Māori word for chicken (heihei) due to the area's poultry farming history.

== Demographics ==
Hei Hei covers 1.24 km^{2} (0.48 sq mi). It had an estimated population of 3,720 as of June 2025, with a population density of 3,000 people per km^{2}.

Historical population
Year	Pop.	±% p.a.
2006	3,114	—
2013	3,390	+1.22%
2018	3,471	+0.47%
2023	3,429	−0.24%

Hei Hei had a population of 3,429 in the 2023 New Zealand census, a decrease of 42 people (−1.2%) since the 2018 census, and an increase of 39 people (1.2%) since the 2013 census. There were 1,740 males, 1,674 females, and 15 people of other genders in 1,200 dwellings. 3.8% of people identified as LGBTIQ+. The median age was 35.9 years (compared with 38.1 years nationally). There were 645 people (18.8%) aged under 15 years, 696 (20.3%) aged 15 to 29, 1,665 (48.6%) aged 30 to 64, and 420 (12.2%) aged 65 or older.

People could identify as more than one ethnicity. The results were 62.6% European (Pākehā); 15.0% Māori; 8.3% Pasifika; 23.3% Asian; 2.1% Middle Eastern, Latin American and African New Zealanders (MELAA); and 3.5% other, which includes people giving their ethnicity as "New Zealander". English was spoken by 94.8%, Māori by 2.8%, Samoan by 3.5%, and other languages by 17.3%. No language could be spoken by 2.3% (e.g. too young to talk). New Zealand Sign Language was known by 0.9%. The percentage of people born overseas was 28.6, compared with 28.8% nationally.

Religious affiliations were 35.2% Christian, 3.0% Hindu, 1.4% Islam, 0.6% Māori religious beliefs, 1.2% Buddhist, 0.4% New Age, and 1.6% other religions. People who answered that they had no religion were 50.0%, and 6.8% of people did not answer the census question.

Of those at least 15 years old, 423 (15.2%) people had a bachelor's or higher degree, 1,386 (49.8%) had a post-high school certificate or diploma, and 972 (34.9%) people exclusively held high school qualifications. The median income was $40,100, compared with $41,500 nationally. 117 people (4.2%) earned over $100,000 compared to 12.1% nationally. The employment status of those at least 15 was 1,509 (54.2%) full-time, 351 (12.6%) part-time, and 90 (3.2%) unemployed.

== Education ==
Gilberthorpe School is a contributing primary school catering for years 1 to 6. It has a roll of 220. The school opened in 1957.

St Bernadette's School is a Catholic full primary school for years 1 to 8, with a roll of 160. It opened in 1962.

Both schools are coeducational. Rolls are as of March 2026.
