= Brazil–New Zealand relations =

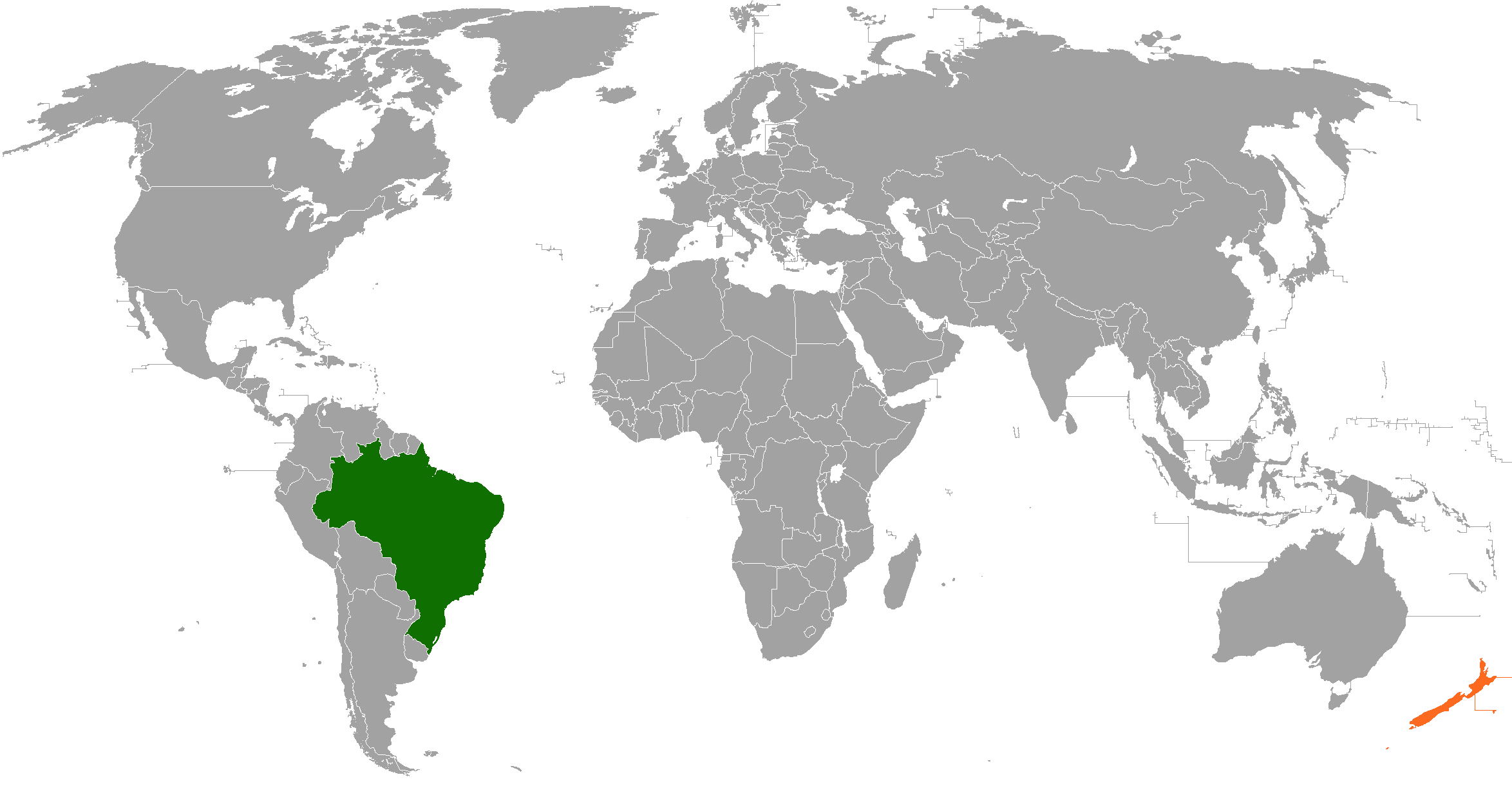

- Brazil: New Zealand

Brazil–New Zealand relations are the diplomatic relations between Brazil and New Zealand. Both nations are members of the Cairns Group and the United Nations.

== History ==
During European colonialism, both Brazil and New Zealand would have been in contact when Portuguese ships carrying goods from Brazil traded with British ships carrying goods from New Zealand. As early as 1874, New Zealand census show Brazilians residing in New Zealand. During World War II, soldiers from Brazil and New Zealand fought together during the Italian Campaign (1943-1945). Both nations are founding members of the United Nations.

Official diplomatic relations between Brazil and New Zealand were established in 1964. In 1997, Brazil opened an embassy in Wellington. In November 2001, New Zealand Prime Minister Helen Clark paid a visit to Brazil, the first by a New Zealand Prime Minister, and inaugurated the New Zealand embassy in Brasília. In 2010, a Working Holiday visa scheme was agreed between both nations. In 2013, New Zealand Prime Minister John Key paid a visit to Brazil. His visit included an official meeting with Brazil's President Dilma Rousseff.

Brazilians are the largest Latin American community in New Zealand. In 2018, both nations held the VIII Brazil-New Zealand Political Consultation Meeting, in Brasília.

In late March 2015, Sergio Danese, the Secretary-General of the Brazilian Ministry of External Relations summoned the New Zealand Ambassador Caroline Bilkey after The New Zealand Herald reported that New Zealand's signal intelligence agency Government Communications Security Bureau (GCSB) had monitored the email and online communications of Brazilian diplomat Roberto Azevedo during his successful 2013 election campaign for the position of Director-General of the World Trade Organization. The GCSB had spied on Azevedo and several other international candidates on behalf of the New Zealand Trade Minister Tim Groser, who was also vying for the position.

== High-level visits ==
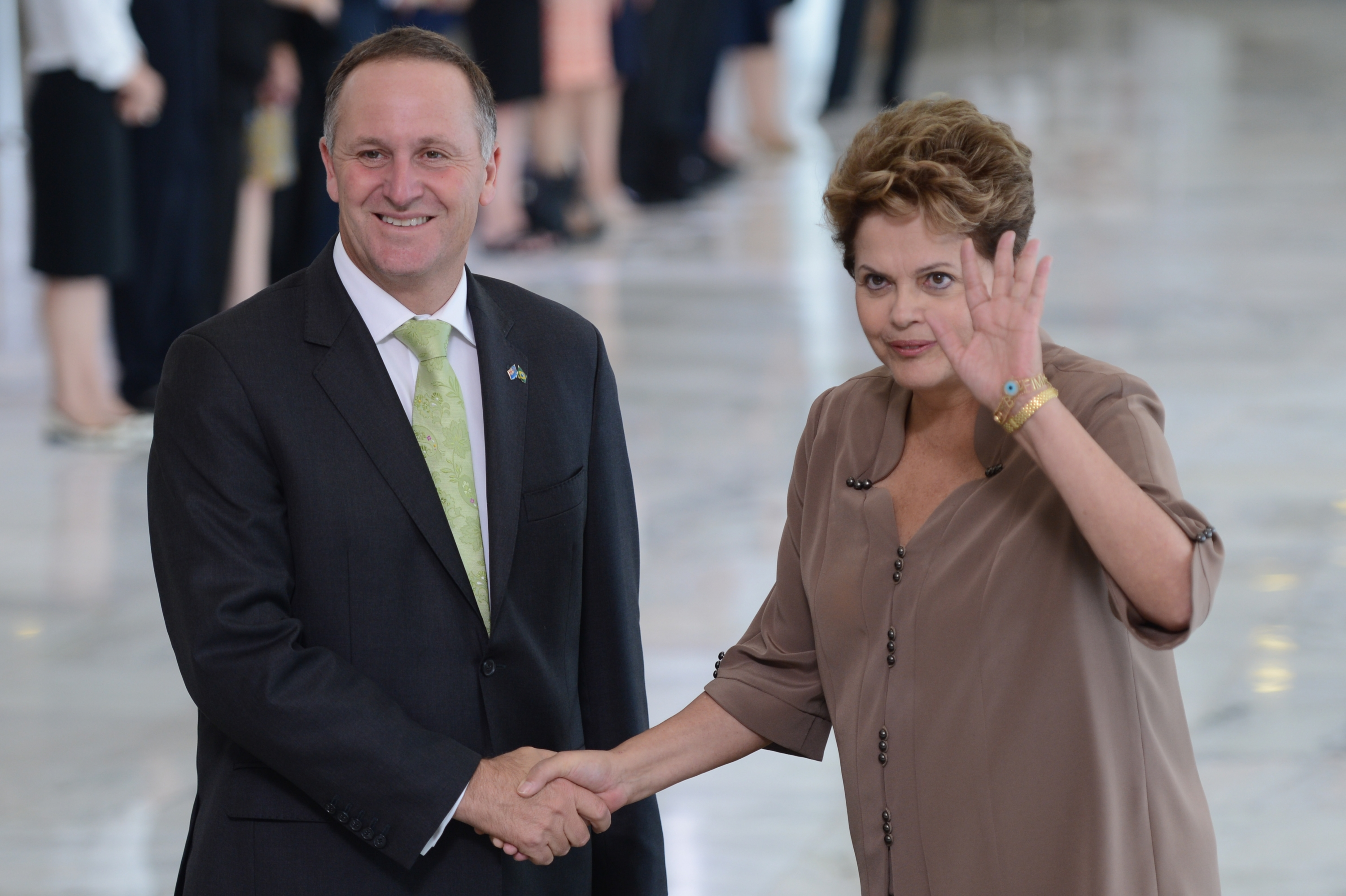
New Zealand Prime Minister John Key visiting with Brazilian President Dilma Rousseff; 2013.

High-level visits from Brazil to New Zealand

- Foreign Minister Celso Amorim (2008)

High-level visits from New Zealand to Brazil

- Prime Minister Helen Clark (2001)
- Prime Minister John Key (2013)
- Governor General Jerry Mateparae (2016)

== Trade ==
In 2018, total trade between both nations amounted to US$204 million. Brazil's main exports to New Zealand include: coffee in grains, orange juice and tobacco. New Zealand's main exports to Brazil include: dairy products, kiwifruit and fish.

== Resident diplomatic missions ==
Of Brazil

- Wellington (Embassy)

Of New Zealand

- Brasília (Embassy)
- São Paulo (Consulate-General)

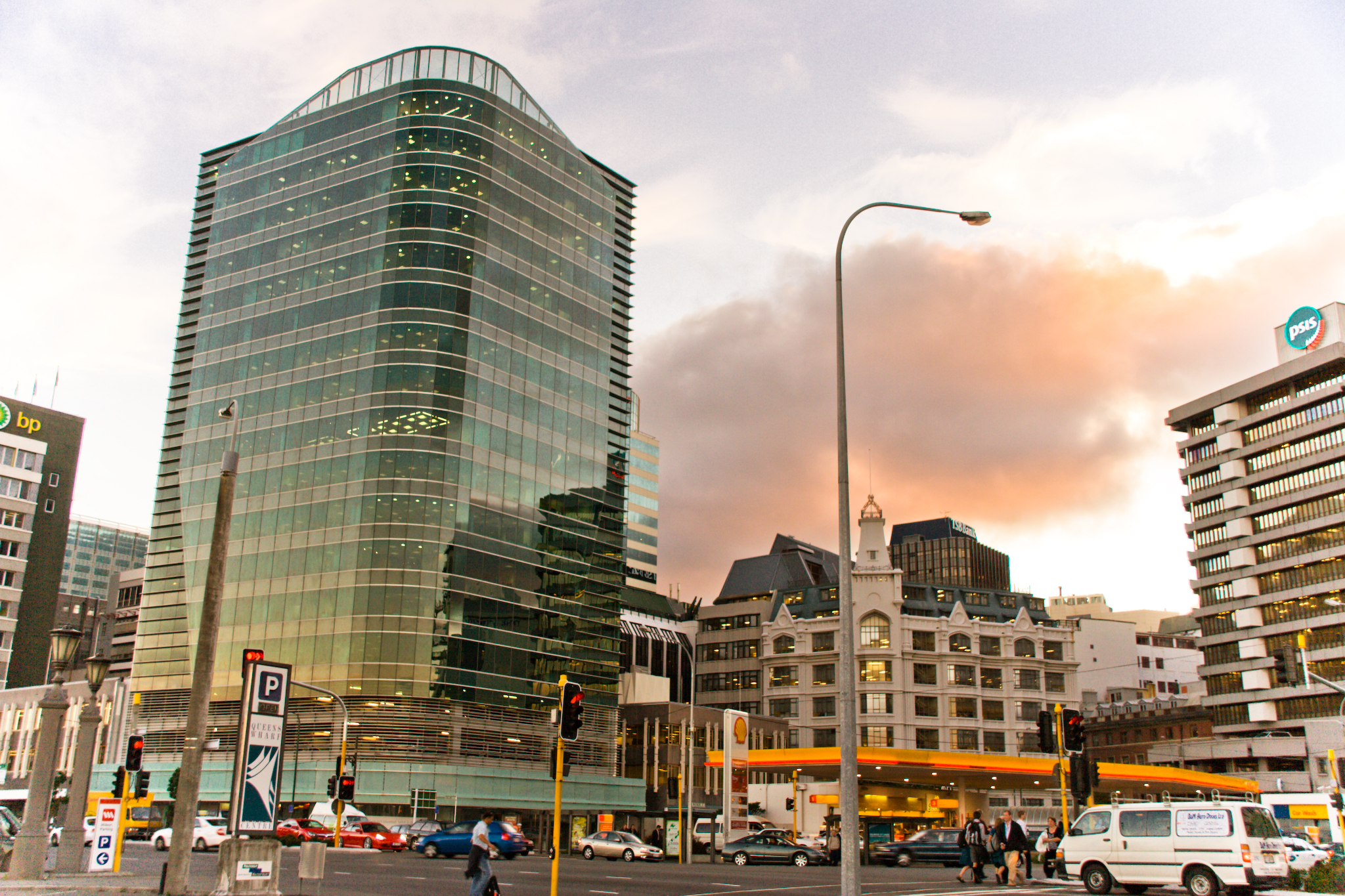
Maritime Tower hosting the Embassy of Brazil in Wellington

== See also ==
- Foreign relations of Brazil
- Foreign relations of New Zealand
- List of ambassadors of New Zealand to Brazil
