= 1988 Labour Party leadership election =

Labour Party leadership elections were held in the following countries in 1988:

- 1988 Labour Party leadership election (UK)
- 1988 New Zealand Labour Party leadership election
