= Seade (surname) =

Seade is a surname. Notable people with the surname include:

- Felipe Seade (1912–1969), Chilean-born, Uruguayan-based painter and teacher
- Jesús Seade (born 1946), Mexican economist, diplomat, and politician
