= 1989 New Zealand Labour Party leadership election =

New Zealand party leadership election

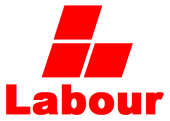
- 8 August 1989
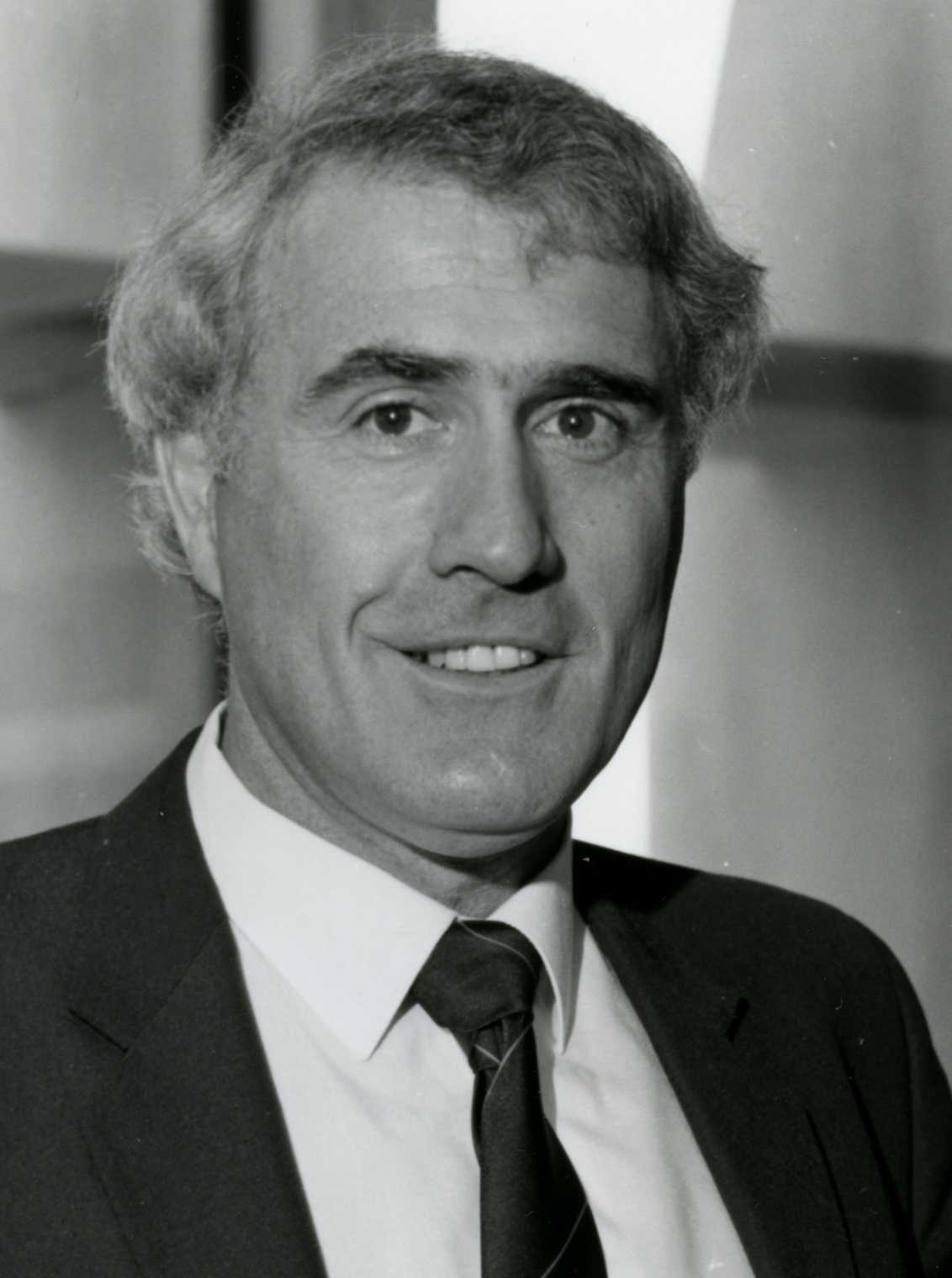

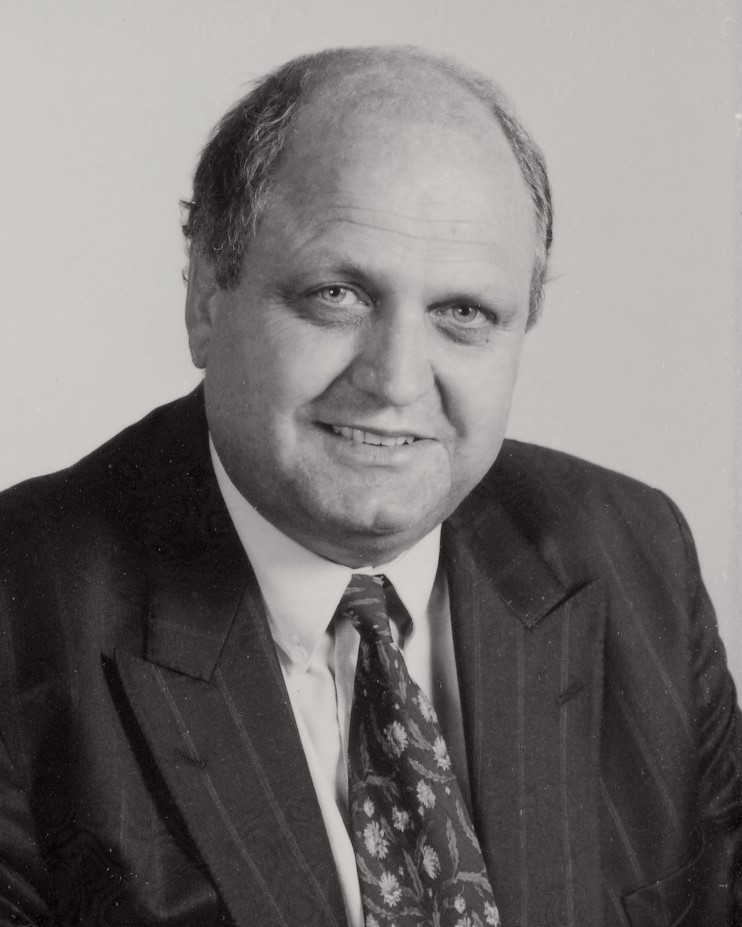
Candidate	Geoffrey Palmer	Mike Moore
Popular vote	41	13
Percentage	75.92%	24.08%
Leader before election
David Lange
Leader after election
Geoffrey Palmer

The 1989 New Zealand Labour Party leadership election was held to determine the leadership of the New Zealand Labour Party. The leadership was won by Christchurch Central MP and incumbent deputy leader Geoffrey Palmer.

== Background ==
David Lange had been leader of the Labour Party since 1983 and Prime Minister since 1984. Roger Douglas had been a key ally of Lange and was Minister of Finance in the Fourth Labour Government until growing divisions between Lange and Douglas over the Government's economic policy (Rogernomics) led to the latter's resignation from the Cabinet in December 1988. A week later, Douglas tried to replace Lange as Labour leader, but failed.

Division in the Labour Party continued through 1989. According to Michael Cullen, the then Minister for Social Welfare, most of caucus wanted both Lange and Douglas in Cabinet with a peace deal. On 3 August 1989, the caucus voted to return Douglas to the cabinet. In response, Lange resigned as leader, interpreting the caucus's support for Douglas as a sign of no-confidence in him.

Former Labour leader and Prime Minister Sir Wallace Rowling was saddened to hear of Lange's resignation. He felt the caucus made a significant error in re-electing Douglas to cabinet stating that the vote indicated caucus was "bent on its own political destruction."

== Candidates ==
Mike Moore

Moore was the Minister of Overseas Trade and one of the senior cabinet ministers in the government and was ranked third in Labour's caucus. He was a supporter of the Rogernomics reforms, albeit less radical. As a result, he was seen as a more acceptable alternative leader to both Douglas and his supporters as well as critics of Douglas. In the lead up to the vote Moore claimed he could only hope to beat Palmer if he had a "clear run" against him, leading Douglas to withdraw.

Geoffrey Palmer

Palmer was the Deputy Prime Minister, Attorney-General, Minister of Justice and Minister for the Environment. He stood for the leadership feeling a sense of duty to do so as Lange's deputy. His image with the populace was one of distance to the publicly resented Rogernomics policies and was instead associated with Labour's more popular policies such as environmentalism, electoral reform and the nuclear-free stance. Many in the party, particularly the newer caucus members, hoped this would allow Labour's popularity to heal and rebrand the party along more positive lines. Australian Prime Minister Bob Hawke backed Palmer for the leadership.

Others

David Caygill had been Minister of Finance since Lange sacked Douglas in 1988. He ruled out standing for Prime Minister saying it was "an appalling job" and that he was enjoying his current role as Finance Minister.

Former Minister of Finance Roger Douglas (who had previously challenged Lange for the leadership in 1988) also considered contesting the position. He later withdrew in favour of Moore upon realizing that he could not beat Palmer and concentrated on a bid for the deputy leadership. He lost this position to left-wing Health Minister Helen Clark by only a narrow margin.

== Public opinion polling ==
Date	Polling organisation	Sample size	Geoffrey Palmer	Mike Moore
19 December 1988	89FM	200	42.1%	57.9%

== Result ==
A caucus vote was held on 8 August 1989. The result of the ballot saw Geoffrey Palmer win the leadership over Mike Moore 41 votes to 13. The result for the deputy leadership was far less decisive, with Helen Clark defeating Roger Douglas 29 votes to 25.

=== Leadership ballot ===
Candidate	Votes	%
Geoffrey Palmer	41	75.92
Mike Moore	13	24.08
Majority	28	51.85
Turnout	54	—N/a

=== Deputy-leadership ballot ===
Candidate	Votes	%
Helen Clark	29	53.71
Roger Douglas	25	46.29
Majority	4	7.40
Turnout	54	—N/a

== Aftermath ==
Palmer led Labour for the next fourteen months, though struggled to repair the party's damaged image. Palmer retained Moore as third in the cabinet rankings and also gave him the coveted position of Minister of Foreign Affairs in early 1990. After it became clear that Labour could not win the next election, Palmer was replaced as leader by Moore only two months before the 1990 general election. Having Moore as leader was believed by many in the Labour caucus to give it better success at the polls. Palmer then decided not to stand for election in 1990 and retired from politics, remaining as Minister for the Environment (outside cabinet) until the election before returning to his academic career.
