= Pascal Lamy =

French businessman and politician (born 1947)

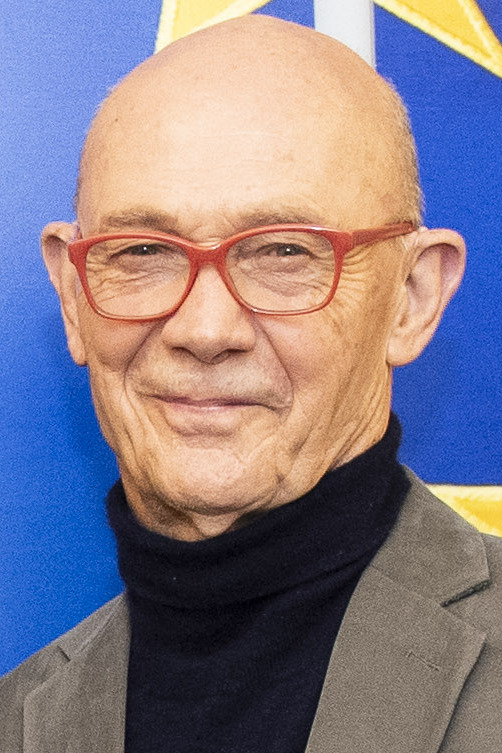
- Lamy in 2024

5th Director-General of the World Trade Organization
- In office 1 September 2005 – 1 September 2013
- Preceded by: Supachai Panitchpakdi
- Succeeded by: Roberto Azevêdo

European Commissioner for Trade
- In office 13 September 1999 – 22 November 2004
- President: Romano Prodi
- Preceded by: Leon Brittan
- Succeeded by: Peter Mandelson

Personal details
- Born: Pascal Lucien Fernand Lamy; 8 April 1947 (age 79) Levallois-Perret, France
- Party: Socialist Party (1969–present)
- Spouse: Geneviève Lamy
- Education: Lycée Carnot
- Alma mater: Sciences Po; HEC Paris; École nationale d'administration

Pascal Lucien Fernand Lamy (French pronunciation: [paskal lami]; born 8 April 1947) is a French political consultant, businessman and former civil servant and politician. He was the Director-General of the World Trade Organization (WTO) from 1 September 2005 to 1 September 2013 for 8 years. In April 2009, WTO members reappointed Lamy for a second 4-year term, beginning on 1 September 2009. He was then succeeded by Roberto Azevêdo. Lamy was previously European Commissioner for Trade for 5 years, from 13 September 1999 to 22 November 2004.

He is an adviser to the transatlantic think tank European Horizons, as well as the honorary president of the Paris-based think tank Notre Europe. In 2018, he was appointed the inaugural president of the Paris Peace Forum, established ahead of the centenary of the Armistice of 11 November 1918.

== Early life ==
Born in the Parisian suburb of Levallois-Perret, Lamy studied at Sciences Po, HEC Paris and the École nationale d'administration, graduating second in his year of those specialising in economics.

He then joined the French civil service at the Inspection générale des finances. In 1979 Lamy was appointed to the post of secretary-general of the Mayoux Committee (Commission Mayoux) tasked with the decentralisation of financial establishments. During 1979–1981 he worked as deputy secretary-general, then secretary-general of the Interministerial Committee for the Remodelling of Industrial Structures (CIASI) in the Treasury department. In 1981 Lamy became a technical adviser, then in 1982 deputy chief of staff (directeur de cabinet adjoint) to Minister of the Economy and Finance Jacques Delors. In 1983 he became deputy chief of staff to Prime Minister Pierre Mauroy.

Lamy has been a member of the Socialist Party since 1969.

== Career ==
=== At the European Commission ===
When Delors became President of the European Commission in 1984, he took Lamy with him to serve as chef de cabinet, which he did until the end of Delors's term in 1994. During his time there, Lamy became known as the "beast of the Berlaymont", the "gendarme" or the "Exocet" due to his habit of ordering civil servants, even Directors-General (heads of department) "precisely what to do – or else." He was seen as ruling Delors's office with a "rod of iron", with no-one able to bypass or manipulate him and those who tried being "banished to one of the less pleasant European postings".

Lamy briefly moved into business at Crédit Lyonnais. Promoted to second in command, he was involved in the restructuring and privatisation of the bank.

Returning to the European Commission in 1999, Lamy was appointed European Commissioner for Trade by Commission President Romano Prodi. Lamy served to the expiry of the commission's term in 2004. His ability to manage the powerful civil servants in his department was noted. During his time in office, he pushed for a new Doha round of world trade talks and advocated reform within the WTO.

=== Director-General of the WTO, 2005–2013 ===
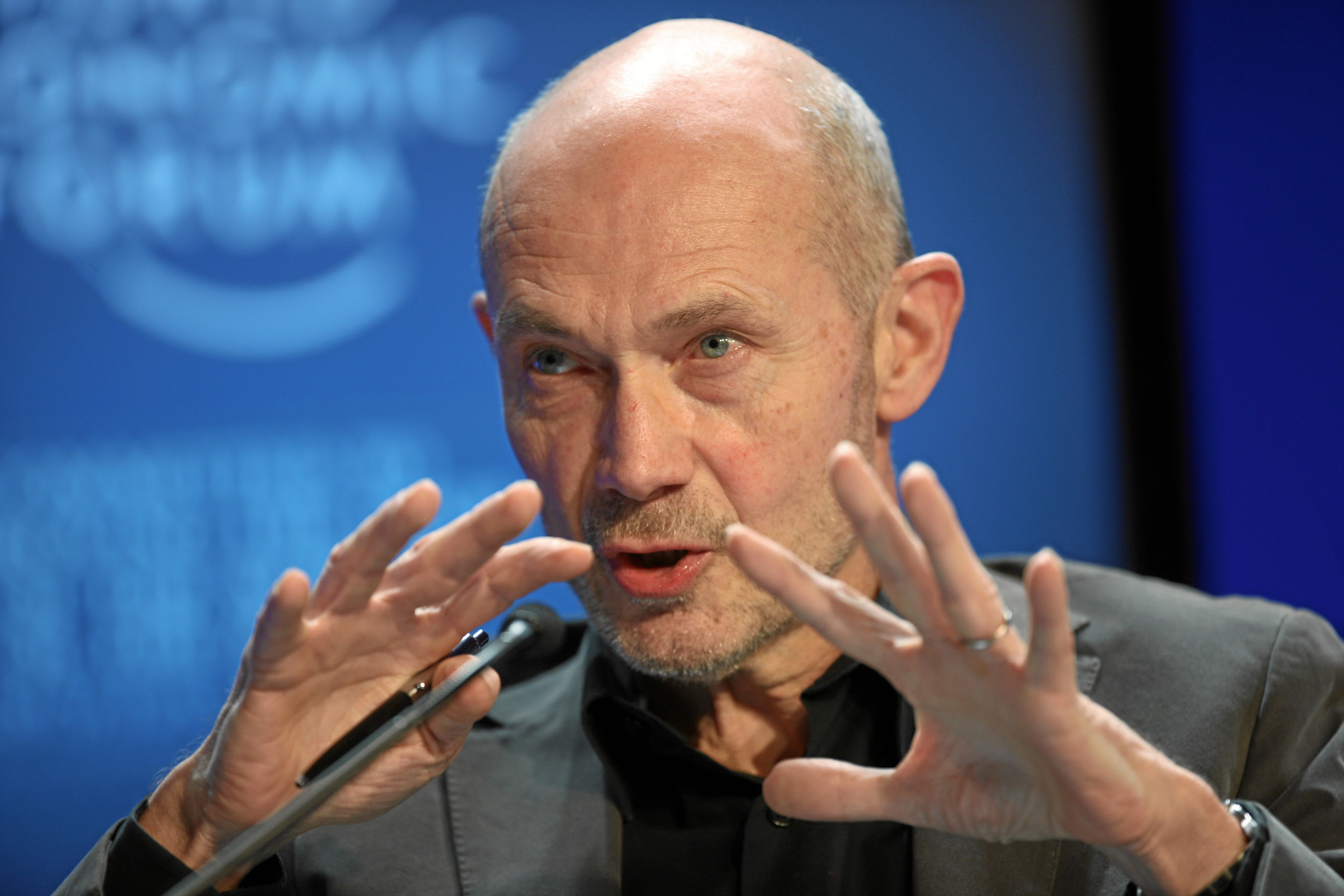
Lamy at the 2010 World Economic Forum

On 13 May 2005, Lamy was chosen as the next director-general of the World Trade Organization, and took office on 1 September 2005 for a four-year term. He had been nominated by the European Union and won over candidates including Carlos Pérez del Castillo of Uruguay and Jaya Krishna Cuttaree of Mauritius.

On 30 April 2009, Lamy was re-elected unanimously by the WTO General Council for a second term of four years, beginning 1 September 2009. He also served as the chairman of the organization's Trade Negotiations Committee. He was the WTO's fifth director-general.

Also in 2009, Lamy served on the High Level Commission on the Modernization of World Bank Group Governance, which – under the leadership of Ernesto Zedillo – conducted an external review of the World Bank Group's governance.

== Later career ==
In 2018, Lamy was appointed president of the Paris Peace Forum. He is a member of the advisory board of the Prague European Summit. In 2019, he joined Brunswick Group merchant bank as its president for European operations.

In 2026, Lamy advised the French government on its successful bid to make Lille the host city of the newly established European Union Customs Authority (EUCA).

== Other activities ==
=== Corporate boards ===
- Danone, Member of the Mission Committee (since 2020)
- Bosch, Member of the International Advisory Committee (since 2015)

=== Non-profit organizations ===
- Africa Europe Foundation (AEF), Member of the High-Level Group of Personalities on Africa-Europe Relations (since 2020)
- Berggruen Institute, Member of the Council for the Future of Europe
- Broader European Leadership Agenda (BELA), Member of the Advisory Board
- Center for Economic and Policy Research (CEPR), Distinguished Fellow (since 2019)
- Centre for European Reform (CER), Member of the Advisory Board
- European Climate Foundation, Member of the Supervisory Board
- Europaeum, Member of the Board of Trustees
- European Council on Foreign Relations (ECFR), Member
- European Horizons, Advisor
- Fondation européenne d'études progressistes (FEPS), vice-president of the Bureau
- French Institute for International and Strategic Affairs (IRIS]), Honorary President of the Board of Directors
- Graduate Institute of International and Development Studies of Geneva, distinguished senior fellow.
- Jacques Delors Centre at Hertie School, Member of the Advisory Board
- Mo Ibrahim Foundation, Member of the Board
- Les Musiciens du Louvre, President of the Board of Directors
- Women Political Leaders Global Forum (WPL), Member of the Global Advisory Board
- Transparency International, Member of the Advisory Council
- UNAIDS–Lancet Commission on Defeating AIDS, Member (2013-2015)

== Personal life ==
Lamy is married and has three sons. His hobbies include running and cycling.

== Select publications ==
- Lamy, Pascal. The Geneva Consensus: Making Trade Work for All. Cambridge: Cambridge University Press, 2013.
- Lamy, Pascal. The Economic Summit and the European Community. Bissell Paper No. 5. Toronto: University of Toronto, Centre for International Studies, 1988

== Lectures ==
The Relationship between WTO Law and General International Law in the Lecture Series of the United Nations Audiovisual Library of International Law

Political offices
Preceded by Édith Cresson; Yves-Thibault de Silguy	French European Commissioner; 1999–2004; Served alongside: Michel Barnier	Succeeded by Jacques Barrot
Preceded by Leon Brittan	European Commissioner for Trade; 1999–2004; Served alongside: Danuta Hübner	Succeeded by Peter Mandelson
Diplomatic posts
Preceded by Supachai Panitchpakdi	Director-General of the World Trade Organization; 2005–2013	Succeeded by Roberto Azevêdo
