= Maria Nazareth Farani Azevêdo =

Brazilian diplomat (born 1957)

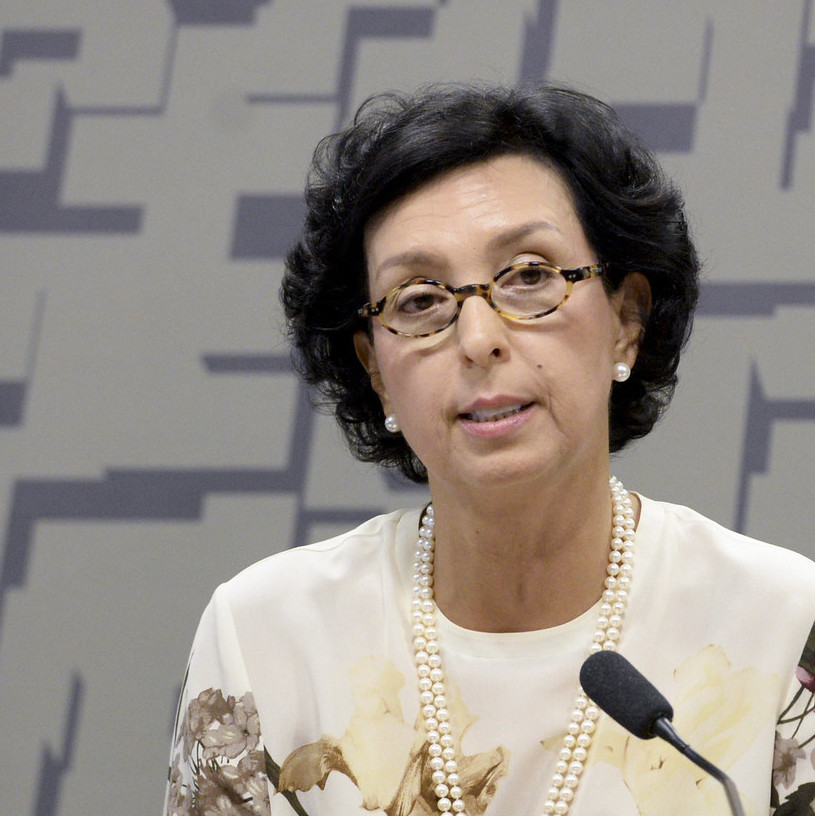
- Born: 15 August 1957 (age 69); Alegre, Espírito Santo
- Education: Rio Branco Institute
- Occupation: Diplomat
- Known for: Brazilian ambassador to the United Nations at Geneva
- Spouse: Roberto Azevêdo
- Children: two

Maria Nazareth Farani Azevêdo (born 15 August 1957) is a career diplomat. She has been the Brazilian Consul General in New York City since 2021.

== Life ==
Azevêdo was born in Alegre, Espírito Santo, in 1957. She trained to be a diplomat at the Rio Branco Institute and she joined the diplomatic service in 1982 as a third secretary. She was promoted to second secretary in 1986.

In 2001 she gained her master's degree from the Rio Branco Institute when she defended her thesis on The Precautionary Principle and the Agreement on the Application of WTO Sanitary and Phytosanitary Measures – The Implications for the Agricultural Reform Process.

On 14 September 2016 she was appointed her country's ambassador to the United Nations Office at Geneva. She succeeded Regina Maria Cordeiro Dunlop, who went on to be Brazil's ambassador in The Hague.

She is currently the consul general of Brazil in the United States, occupying that position at the Consulate General of Brazil in New York since 2021.

== Private life ==
Azevedo is married to Roberto Azevêdo, who served as the director-general of the World Trade Organization from 2013 to 2020. They have two daughters, Paula and Luísa.
