= Renato Ruggiero =

Italian politician (1930–2013)

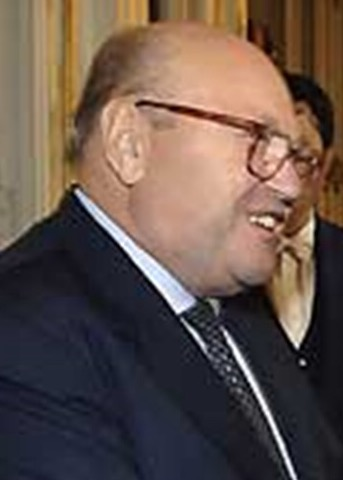

Permanent Representative of Italy to the European Union
- In office 1979–1984
- Prime Minister: Francesco Cossiga
- Preceded by: Eugenio Plaja
- Succeeded by: Pietro Calamia

Minister of Foreign Trade
- In office 28 July 1987 – 12 April 1991
- Prime Minister: Giovanni Goria; Ciriaco De Mita; Giulio Andreotti
- Preceded by: Mario Sarcinelli
- Succeeded by: Vito Lattanzio

2nd Director-General of the World Trade Organization
- In office 1 May 1995 – 1 September 1999
- Preceded by: Peter Sutherland
- Succeeded by: Mike Moore

Minister of Foreign Affairs
- In office 11 June 2001 – 6 January 2002
- Prime Minister: Silvio Berlusconi
- Preceded by: Giuliano Amato (Acting)
- Succeeded by: Silvio Berlusconi (Acting)

Personal details
- Born: 9 April 1930 Naples, Italy
- Died: 4 August 2013 (aged 83) Milan, Italy
- Party: PSI (1969-1994); Independent (1994–2013)
- Spouse: Paola Tomacelli Filomarino
- Children: 3
- Education: University of Naples Federico II

Renato Ruggiero (9 April 1930 – 4 August 2013) was an Italian diplomat and politician. He was Director-General of the World Trade Organization from 1995 to 1999 and briefly served as Italy's Foreign Minister in 2001.

== Biography ==
Born in Naples on 9 April 1930, Ruggiero graduated from Naples University in 1953 with a law degree, thereafter entering the foreign service. He subsequently held posts in private firms such as Fiat and the energy firm ENI. After a brilliant business career, he became a top-ranking diplomat and was involved in tough situations such as the Sigonella crisis in 1985. He was famous for his abilities as a strong-minded negotiator and thus earned the nickname of "Rocky" Ruggiero. At the time of his death in 2013, Ruggiero was an Ambassador and was working for Citigroup. He was a member of the Steering Committee of the Bilderberg Group.

== Honours ==
Order of Merit of the Italian Republic 1st Class / Knight Grand Cross – 3 October 1985

Ruggiero was awarded the Grand Cross of the Order of the Sacred Treasure by the government of Japan.

== See also ==
- Ministry of Foreign Affairs (Italy)
- Foreign relations of Italy

Diplomatic posts
Preceded by Peter Sutherland	Director-General of the World Trade Organization; 1995–1999	Succeeded by Mike Moore
Political offices
Preceded by Lamberto Dini	Italian Minister of Foreign Affairs; 2001–2002	Succeeded by Franco Frattini
