= Regina Maria Cordeiro Dunlop =

Brazilian ambassador

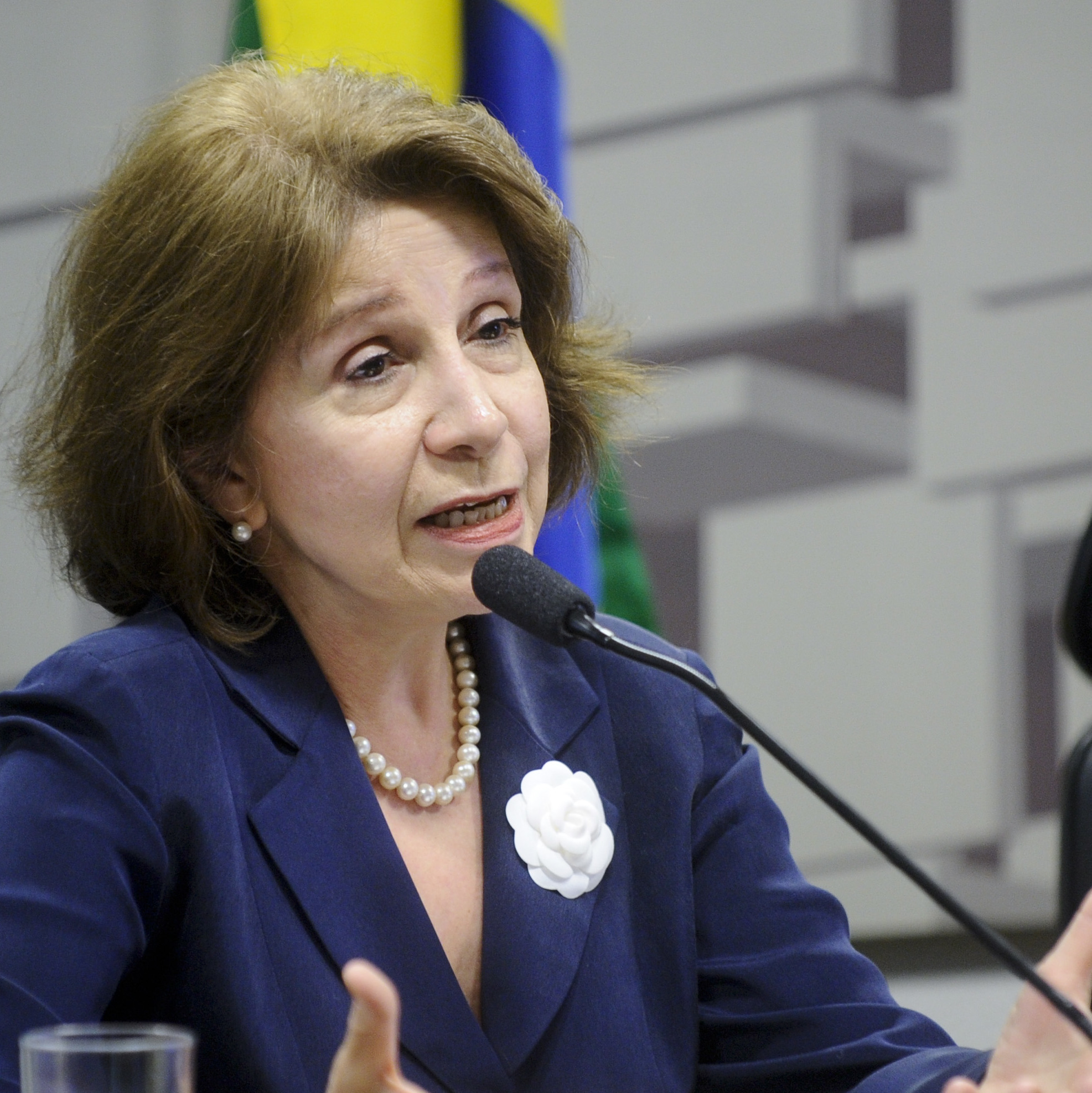
- Born: July 9, 1950 (age 76); Rio de Janeiro
- Occupation: Ambassador
- Known for: Permanent Representative at the United Nations
- Successor: Maria Nazareth Farani Azevêdo

Regina Maria Cordeiro Dunlop (born July 9, 1950) is a Brazilian Ambassador. In 2016 she left Geneva where she had been the Permanent Representative at the United Nations to be Brazil's ambassador in The Hague

== Life ==
Dunlop was born in Rio de Janeiro in 1950. She joined the diplomatic service as a graduate in 1982.

In 2009 she was appointed to be the Alternate Permanent Representative on Brazil at the United Nations in New York. In 2013 she went to Geneva where she became the Permanent Representative at the United Nations. She was succeeded on 14 September 2016 by Maria Nazareth Farani Azevêdo. Dunlop became Brazil's ambassador in The Hague.
