= Supachai Panitchpakdi =

Thai politician and professor (born 1946)

- ศุภชัย พานิชภักดิ์
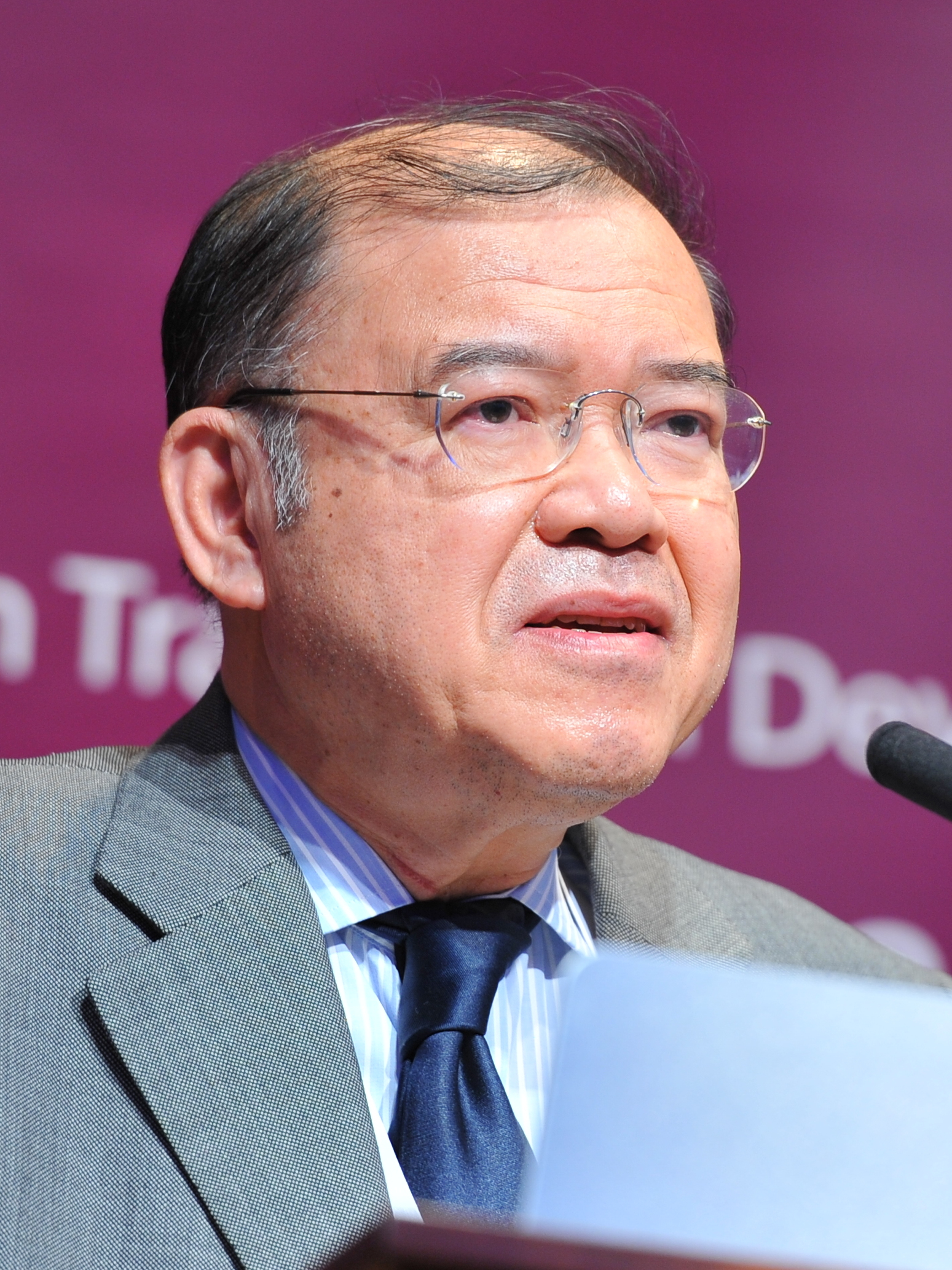
- Supachai in 2012

9th Secretary-General of the UNCTAD
- In office 1 September 2005 – 30 August 2013
- Preceded by: Carlos Fortin
- Succeeded by: Mukhisa Kituyi

4th Director-General of the World Trade Organization
- In office 1 September 2002 – 1 September 2005
- Preceded by: Mike Moore
- Succeeded by: Pascal Lamy

Deputy Prime Minister of Thailand
- In office 14 November 1997 – 9 November 2000
- Prime Minister: Chuan Leekpai

Minister of Commerce
- In office 14 November 1997 – 9 November 2000
- Prime Minister: Chuan Leekpai
- Preceded by: Som Jatusripitak
- Succeeded by: Adisai Potaramik

Personal details
- Born: 30 May 1946 (age 80) Bangkok, Thailand
- Party: Democrat Party
- Spouse: Sasai Panitchpakdi
- Children: 2
- Education: Erasmus University Rotterdam (PhD)
- Profession: Politician; economist

Supachai Panitchpakdi (Thai: ศุภชัย พานิชภักดิ์, RTGS: Supphachai Phanitchaphak, pronounced [sùp.pʰā.t͡ɕʰāj pʰāː.nít.t͡ɕʰā.pʰák]; born 30 May 1946) is a Thai politician and professor. He was Secretary-General of the UN Conference on Trade and Development (UNCTAD) from 1 September 2005 to 31 August 2013. Prior to this, he was the Director-General of the World Trade Organization (WTO) from 1 September 2002 to 1 September 2005. He was succeeded by Pascal Lamy.

== Education ==
Supachai studied in primary and secondary education at Saint Gabriel's College and Triam Udom Suksa School. Then he received his master's degree in economics, development planning, and his PhD in economic planning and development at the Netherlands School of Economics (now known as Erasmus University) in Rotterdam. In 1973, he completed his doctoral dissertation under supervision of Professor Jan Tinbergen, the first Nobel laureate in economics. In the same year, he went to Cambridge University as a visiting fellow to conduct research on development models.

== Political careers ==
In 1986 Supachai Panitchpakdi was appointed as Thailand's Deputy Minister of Finance, but when parliament was dissolved in 1988 he left politics and became president of Thai Military Bank. In 1992 he returned to politics and became deputy prime minister until 1995, responsible for trade and economics. During the Asian financial crisis in November 1997 he returned to be deputy prime minister and also became minister of commerce.

== World Trade Organization ==
On 22 July 1999 he was elected to become Director-General of the World Trade Organization, sharing the post with Mike Moore when a decision could not be reached. Taking the second half of the six-year term, he entered office on 1 September 2002.

== UNCTAD ==
In March 2005 he was appointed Secretary-General of the UN Conference on Trade and Development (UNCTAD) following his term at the WTO, a post he took up in late-2005. He was appointed for a second four-year term in September 2009. Keen to reform and revitalise the organisation, he has established a Panel of Eminent Persons to oversee the start of reform of UNCTAD.

== Selected works ==
He published numerous books, including Educational Growth in Developing Countries (1974), Globalization and Trade in the New Millennium (2001) and China and the WTO: Changing China, Changing World Trade (2002, co-authored with Mark Clifford).

Diplomatic posts
Preceded by Mike Moore	Director-General of the World Trade Organization; 2002–2005	Succeeded by Pascal Lamy
Preceded by Carlos Fortin	Secretary General of the United Nations Conference on Trade and Development; 1 September 2005–31 August 2013	Succeeded by Mukhisa Kituyi
