= Jesús Seade =

Mexican politician (born 1946)

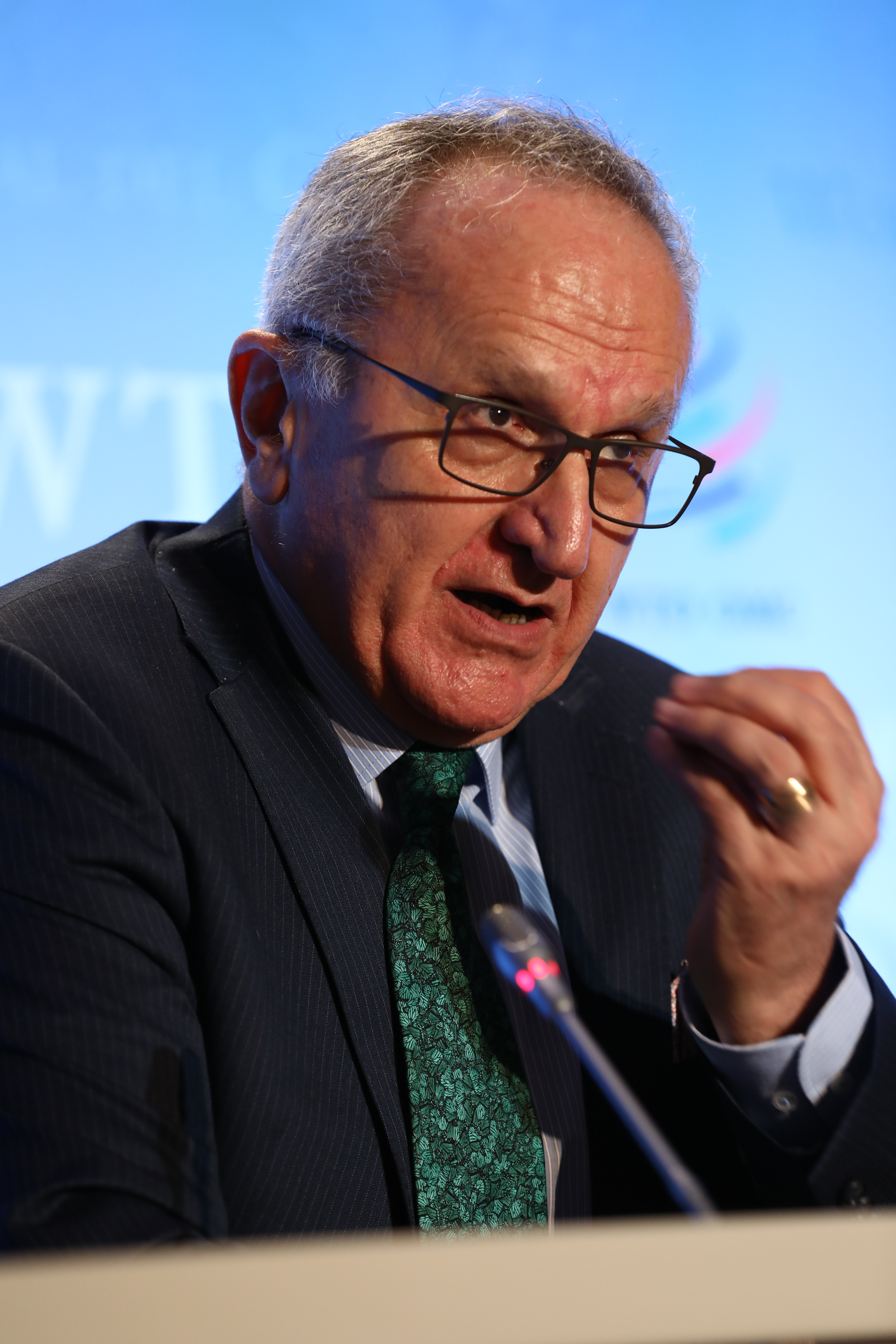
- Born: 24 December 1946 (age 79); Mexico City, Mexico
- Education: Chemical Engineering
- Alma mater: Universidad Nacional Autónoma de México, El Colegio de México, University of Oxford
- Occupations: Economist, politician, trade negotiator, scholar
- Known for: Role in World Trade Organization, International Monetary Fund, negotiator in the USMCA
- Spouse: Dalcy Cabrera Ríos
- Website: https://lideresmexicanos.com/300/jesus-seade-kuri/

Jesús Seade Kuri (born December 24, 1946, in Mexico City) is a Mexican economist, diplomat, and politician whose career has included roles in international trade negotiations and work on financial and debt crises at multilateral institutions. Since December 1, 2018, he has served as Undersecretary for North America in Mexico’s Ministry of Foreign Affairs (SRE).

In March 2018, then-presidential candidate Andrés Manuel López Obrador asked Seade to act as his representative in the ongoing North American Free Trade Agreement (NAFTA) renegotiations being conducted by the administration of President Enrique Peña Nieto. As a member of President-elect López Obrador’s transition team, Seade participated in the final stages of the renegotiation of NAFTA, which resulted in the United States–Mexico–Canada Agreement (USMCA/T-MEC/CUSMA).

A dual citizen of Mexico and Lebanon, Seade has lived for extended periods in the United Kingdom, Switzerland, the United States, Hong Kong, the People’s Republic of China, and Mexico, as well as spending a year divided between France and Brazil. He has worked closely with officials and authorities from more than 70 countries across Africa, Latin America, Asia, Europe, the Middle East, and North America.

At the World Bank (WB), Seade worked on fiscal policy and later served as chief economist for the Brazil department. At the International Monetary Fund (IMF), he managed major debt relief for 15 African countries and led efforts during financial crises in Turkey, Brazil, and Argentina.

At the World Trade Organization (WTO), he served as one of the negotiators in the Uruguay Round that led to the WTO’s establishment and later held the position of Deputy Director-General. On June 8, 2020, Seade was officially nominated by the Mexican government as a candidate for Director-General of the World Trade Organization (WTO), but his candidacy did not progress beyond the first round of consultations.

== Education ==
Seade graduated with honors as Chemical Engineer from the National Autonomous University of Mexico (UNAM) and earned his master's and PhD in Economics from the University of Oxford under the direction of James Mirrlees. His doctoral thesis is about optimal tax policies in face of the balance of effects on incentives and income distribution. During his last year as a student at Oxford University, he taught a Masters Course on Microeconomics and published an article.

== Career ==
=== World Bank ===
From 1986 to 1989, he worked at the World Bank as principal economist in Country Policy department. He was involved in fiscal policy and reform on the Democratic Republic of the Congo (DRC), then Zaire, and on the design of Morocco's Value Added Tax (VAT). He later became Chief Economist leading all the economic work in the Department of Brazil, including the implementation of the new Brazilian VAT.

=== GATT and Uruguay Round ===
In March 1989, Jesús Seade began as Mexico's ambassador to the General Agreement on Tariffs and Trade (GATT). He successfully represented Mexico in two dispute settlement cases against the United States concerning antidumping measures on cement and restrictions on tuna imports. He chaired several committees and working groups and took part in the Uruguay Round negotiations. This negotiation (1986–94) entered at the end of 1989, into a three-year state of crisis, after which the GATT directive was changed as a last attempt to revive and conclude the negotiations.

The new team, with Peter Sutherland at its head and Jesus Seade as one of its three Deputy Directors-General (DDG), managed to successfully conclude the negotiations (1993–94), including an important additional negotiation focused on the benefits and obligations of the UN's least developed countries. This negotiation was led and chaired by DDG Seade and allowed the final closure of the negotiations as a whole and the creation of the World Trade Organization (WTO).

During this period, Seade also conceived and led the preparation of the Review of the Uruguay Round Agreements, which was a formal requirement posed by the developing countries, to be fulfilled before closing the negotiations. This involved an in-depth and honest analysis of the results, rather than the expected short formal commentary, which played a central role in releasing tensions and helped significantly to reach a final agreement.

The Uruguay Round negotiations, the eighth round of the Multilateral Trade Negotiations of the GATT (General Agreement on Tariffs and Trade), were the most complex trade and/or economic negotiations that the multilateral trading system has ever successfully concluded. Throughout these negotiations, the creation of a new organization was never proposed: the aim was to reach a series of important agreements on different issues and sectors within the framework of the GATT itself. It was only towards the end of the negotiations that three members formulated the proposal to create the WTO. The co-authors of this proposal were the European Economic Community, Canada, and Mexico, the latter with Jesus Seade as its representative.

During his tenure as Permanent Representative to the GATT, Ambassador Seade also led the Mexico's accession negotiations to the Organisation for Economic Cooperation and Development (OECD) in 1994, the first developing country to be part of it, as well as the works in the committees of which his country initially became part of: Trade and Competition.

=== World Trade Organization ===
As Deputy Director-General of the new World Trade Organization, Ambassador Seade was directly responsible for a range of important sectors, including: the WTO's relations with government authorities in capitals, business sectors and press; the trade-finance relationship (coherence) and with the Bretton Woods institutions as well as with the United Nations System; development and training areas; and administration and personnel. On behalf of the WTO, he negotiated a Cooperation Agreement with the IMF with favorable terms for the WTO, as well as another with the World Bank.

=== International Monetary Fund (IMF) ===
The 1997 Asian financial crisis affected the entire world in transition and development in the following years. In 1998 Ambassador Seade was invited to collaborate with the IMF as Assistant Director, in charge of the work related to the financial crises that Argentina, Turkey and Brazil suffered; in relation, he coordinated the largest loan in the history of the IMF at the time: a G7 syndication for $29 billion. Concurrently, he led the work for the massive external debt forgiveness of 15 highly indebted African countries within the framework of the HIPC Initiative (Heavily Indebted Poor Countries).

After that, he was a Senior Tax Advisor and headed a wide range of technical assistance and other specialized work in Africa, the Middle East, Latin America and Europe. He also supervised the IMF's work on banking, data and fiscal transparency and headed operations on fiscal transparency. Ambassador Seade was also responsible for the IMF's position on any aspect of trade policy that arose, including in relation to the WTO.

=== Other duties ===
During 1976 to 1986, he was Chair Professor at the University of Warwick, G.B., where he founded and directed the Development Economics Research Centre; founding director of the Center for Economic Studies of El Colegio de México; and visiting professor for one semester each at the Center d'études prospectives en économie mathématique appliquée à la planning (CEPREMAP) in Paris, France, and at the Instituto de Matemática Pura e Aplicada (IMPA) in Rio de Janeiro, Brazil.

From 1998 to 2010, concurrently with his duties at the IMF and beyond, he was member of the Advisory Council on International Economic Law at Georgetown University Law School in Washington, DC.

From 2008 to 2014 he was vice-president of Lingnan University in Hong Kong, and from 2007 to 2016 he was Chair professor in economics. During that period, he was a member of the advisory councils of the Ministers of Financial Services, and Commerce and Industry of Hong Kong SAR government; and led a study carried out by several Hong Kong universities with official sponsorship in Hong Kong as a financial center for China and the world. Since 2007 he has played an important role in the development of the Hong Kong Social Enterprise Research Academy on promoting Corporate Social Responsibility, of which he is Vice President.

In 2017, he started functions as Associate Vice President for Global Affairs at the Chinese University of Hong Kong, Shenzhen.

From 2007-2018, he had extensive participation in official, financial and business forums of Hong Kong and the People's Republic of China.

=== Negotiation of USMCA ===
After the electoral victory of President Andrés Manuel López Obrador on July 1, 2018 in Mexico, Seade was appointed as negotiator in the modernization of NAFTA, initially accompanying the negotiating team of Peña Nieto’s government. The negotiation of the USMCA formally concluded on September 30, 2018 and the agreement was signed in Argentina on November 30, 2018, by the Heads of State: Enrique Peña Nieto, then President of Mexico; Donald Trump of the United States and Justin Trudeau, Prime Minister of Canada. However, the ratification process in the United States came to an impasse as control in the US Congress changed with the legislative elections of November 2018. It became necessary to reopen the negotiating process in a limited way, to find a solution to the main problems posed by the Democratic majority in the US Congress, in a way that was acceptable and satisfactory for the three countries.

President López Obrador again appointed Jesús Seade as chief negotiator, already with the position of Undersecretary for North America at the Ministry of Foreign Affairs, whose main task would be to ensure that any adjustment in what was negotiated was good for Mexico to promote the ratification of the T-MEC. He also entrusted him with the responsibility for all other trade negotiations with the United States, particularly in relation to tariffs on Mexican steel and aluminum exports imposed by the United States under Section 232 of the Trade Expansion Act of 1962 regarding U.S. national security, which was a clear obstacle for the UMSCA ratification in both countries.

Receiving the task in April 2019, Seade engaged in an intense three-week negotiation and reached a fully satisfactory resolution for both sides. After difficult negotiations during the rest of the year focused on the demand of many members of Congress to have strong and reliable provisions to ensure Mexico's compliance with its commitments in all areas of the treaty, a minimum modified agreement was reached from what was previously accorded. Its central result was the creation of a balanced, binding, law-based State-State Dispute Settlement (SSDS) system, a foreign investment protection system that NAFTA was lacking.

On June 19, 2019, the Mexican Senate approved the USMCA as it was initially negotiated with 114 votes in favor, 4 against and 3 abstentions, and on December 12 of the same year it approved the Modifying Protocol, by a majority of 107 votes in favor, 1 against and 0 abstentions. The United States House of Representatives approved the implementing bill of the USMCA on December 19, 2019 with 385 votes in favor and 41 against, and the US Senate approved it on January 16, 2020 with 89 votes in favor and 10 against. Finally, the House of Commons and the Canadian Senate approved the treaty implementation law on March 13, 2020, in both instances unanimously.

=== Embezzlement allegations ===
On October 14, 2020, as Undersecretary for North America in the Mexican government, Seade Kuri was accused of embezzlement and abusing functions on the Alert Citizens portal of the Civil Service Secretariat by the newspaper El Universal. According to the anonymous citizen complaint, he used public funds for the making of five private trips to Hong Kong for an amount greater than 800 thousand pesos, pretending to make official commissions there on behalf of the government of Mexico. The charges were investigated ex officio by the Secretariat of the Federal Public Service. On October 14, 2020 at night, Seade sent a letter to the national newspaper stating that the accusations were false. According to Seade, those 5 publicly resourced trips to Hong Kong, some lasting between 10 and 20 days each and in first class, aimed to "strengthen communication channels with local authorities and businessmen with respect to the T-MEC." He also stated that he paid for his bag air tickets for 2 of the 5 first-class trips to Hong Kong.

On 6 November 2020, the Internal Control Body of the Secretariat of Foreign Affairs concluded an administrative investigation against Jesus Seade, ruling that "not enough evidence was found to likely demonstrate the commission of any conduct for which administrative responsibility is no longer noticed".

== Miguel Hidalgo Prize ==
On November 11, 2020, president Andrés Manuel López Obrador awarded Seade the Presea Miguel Hidalgo, an award to citizens' contribution to their country. At the brief ceremony that took place during López Obrador's daily morning press conference, Seade announced he was retiring from public office and leaving Mexico in order to move back to Hong Kong.
