= Director-General of the World Trade Organization =

Position

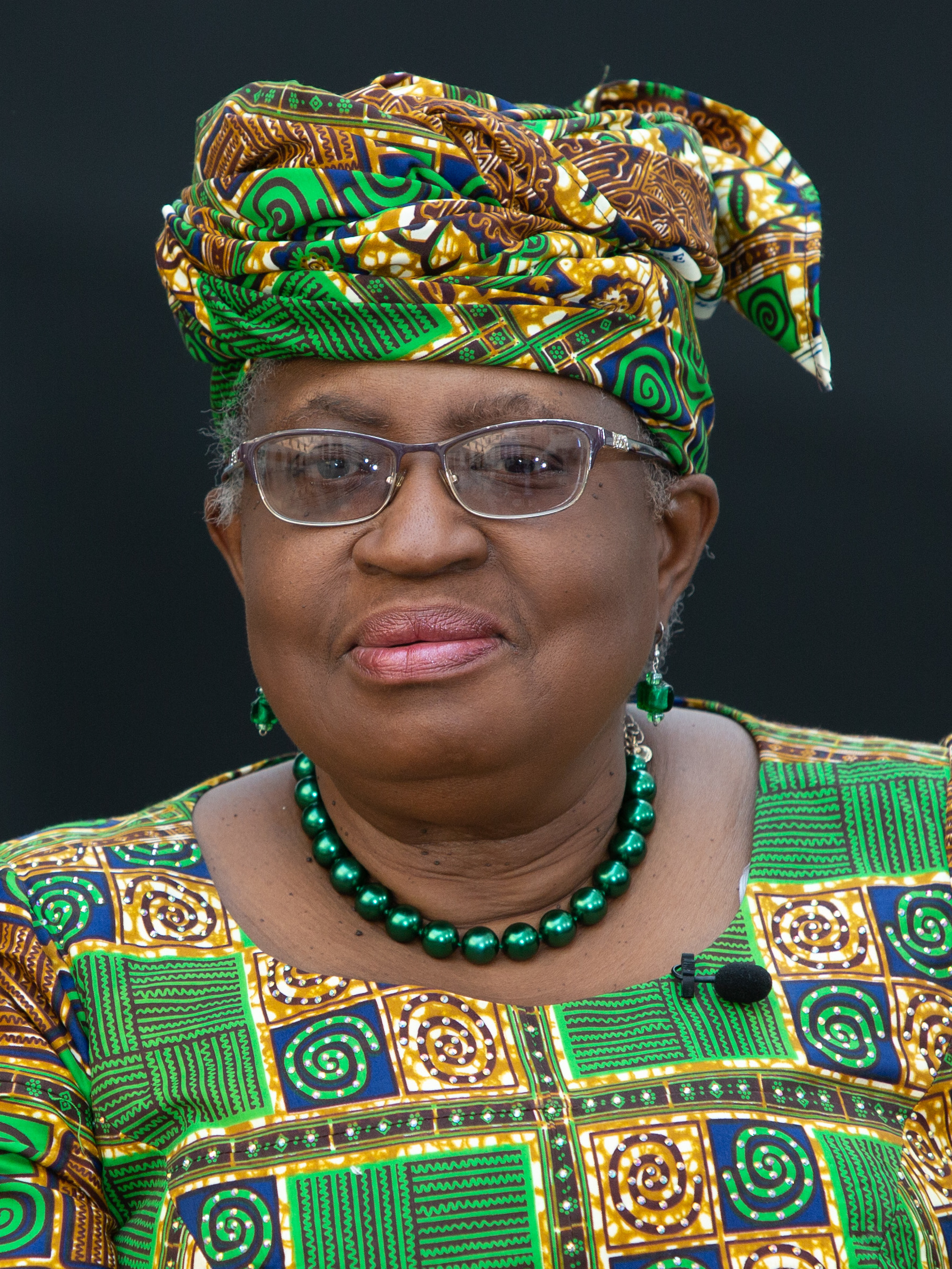
- Incumbent; Ngozi Okonjo-Iweala since 1 March 2021
- World Trade Organization
- Style: Madam Director-General (informal); Her Excellency (diplomatic)
- Status: Chief Administrative Officer
- Reports to: General Council
- Seat: Centre William Rappard, Geneva, Switzerland
- Appointer: General Council
- Term length: Four years, renewable
- Constituting instrument: WTO Organization Chart
- Formation: 1 January 1995
- First holder: Peter Sutherland
- Deputy: Deputy Director-Generals
- Website: www.wto.org

The director-general of the World Trade Organization is the officer of the World Trade Organization (WTO) responsible for supervising and directing the organization's administrative operations. Since the World Trade Organization's decisions are made by member states, either through a Ministerial Conference or through the General Council, the director-general has little power over matters of policy – the role is primarily advisory and managerial in nature. The director-general supervises the WTO secretariat of about 700 staff and is appointed by WTO members for a term of four years.

On 1 March 2021, Dr. Ngozi Okonjo-Iweala of Nigeria took office, becoming both the first woman and the first African to hold this position.

Before the formation of the WTO, the General Agreement on Tariffs and Trade (GATT) had a series of directors-general. Peter Sutherland was the last director-general of GATT and the first of the WTO.

== List of directors-general ==
This is a list of former holders of the office of Director-General. The post was created in 1995, although the earlier office of Executive Secretary is often seen as a direct equivalent.

No.	Portrait	Name and dates	Term		Home country
No.	Portrait	Name and dates	Start	End	Home country
1		Peter Sutherland (1946–2018)	1 July 1993	30 April 1995	(Republic of Ireland) Ireland
2		Renato Ruggiero (1930–2013)	1 May 1995	31 August 1999	Italy
3		Mike Moore (1949–2020)	1 September 1999	31 August 2002	New Zealand
4		Supachai Panitchpakdi (born 1946)	1 September 2002	31 August 2005	Thailand
5		Pascal Lamy (born 1947)	1 September 2005	31 August 2009	France
5		Pascal Lamy (born 1947)	1 September 2009	31 August 2013	France
6		Roberto Azevêdo (born 1957)	1 September 2013	31 August 2017	Brazil
6		Roberto Azevêdo (born 1957)	1 September 2017	31 August 2020	Brazil
7		Ngozi Okonjo-Iweala (born 1954)	1 March 2021	31 August 2025	Nigeria
7		Ngozi Okonjo-Iweala (born 1954)	1 September 2025	Incumbent	Nigeria

=== 2020 director-general selection ===
In May 2020, Director-General Azevedo announced that he would step down on 31 August 2020, a year before his mandate was due to expire. On 17 August 2020, human rights organizations urged the member nations to reject the nomination of Saudi Arabia's Mohammad Al-Tuwaijri, citing the country's poor human rights records.

General Council Chair David Walker initiated a process of consultation with members from 7 September 2020 onwards, through which the field of candidates was gradually reduced until an appointment was to be made. Eight candidates were put forward by WTO member governments to succeed Azevedo.

The final selection required a consensus of the 164 member countries and was expected to take place in November, 2020. However, due to "the health situation and current events" the meeting was postponed.

List of candidates
Country	Name	Notes	Ref.
Nigeria	Ngozi Okonjo-Iweala	Former Managing Director of the World Bank, Finance Minister and Minister of Foreign Affairs	
Withdrawn on 5 February 2021 after consultation with major countries such as the United States
South Korea	Yoo Myung-hee	Minister for Trade of South Korea	
Withdrawn on 6 October 2020 after the second round of consultations
Kenya	Amina C. Mohamed	Cabinet Secretary for Sports, Heritage and Culture in Kenya	
Saudi Arabia	Mohammad Al-Tuwaijri	Minister ranked advisor at the Royal Court, ex-minister of Economy and Planning	
United Kingdom	Liam Fox	Former Secretary of State for International Trade and Secretary of State for Defence in the UK	
Withdrawn on 18 September 2020 after the first round of consultations
Mexico	Jesús Seade Kuri	Undersecretary for North America for the Mexican Ministry of Foreign Affairs	
Egypt	Abdel-Hamid Mamdouh	Negotiator for Egypt and senior WTO official	
Moldova	Tudor Ulianovschi	Former Foreign Minister of Moldova	
