= 1988 New Zealand Labour Party leadership election =

New Zealand party leadership election

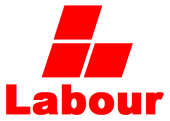
- 21 December 1988
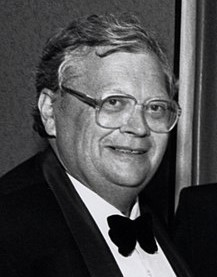

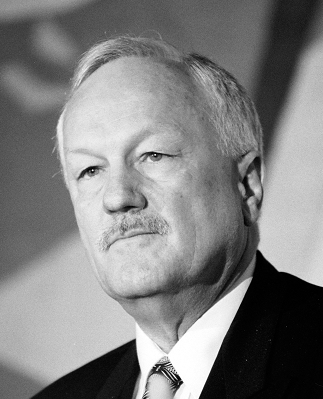
Candidate	David Lange	Roger Douglas
Popular vote	38	15
Percentage	69.09%	27.27%
Leader before election
David Lange
Leader after election
David Lange

The 1988 New Zealand Labour Party leadership election was held on 21 December 1988. The incumbent leader of the New Zealand Labour Party David Lange was re-elected with 69% of the vote. Until the August 2026 challenge to Christopher Luxon, it was the only instance when an incumbent New Zealand Prime Minister has been publicly challenged for leadership in a caucus vote.

== Causes ==
After Labour's re-election at the 1987 election, an increasing rift opened up in the governing Labour Party between Prime Minister David Lange and Roger Douglas the Minister of Finance. Troubled by Douglas' idea of a flat tax and further Rogernomics reforms after the stock market crash in October 1987, Lange unilaterally put a halt to them in January 1988 while Douglas was out of the country in a press conference where he called for the nation to "have a cup of tea". In December 1988, Lange and Douglas' relationship bottomed out when Lange refused to renew the employment contract of Bevan Burgess, Douglas' press secretary, which was the major catalyst that led Douglas to decide leave Cabinet. Douglas then wrote to Lange to tell him that he intended to tell the Labour caucus he could no longer serve in a government led by him. Lange construed this letter as a resignation. Douglas was sacked as Minister of Finance and replaced with David Caygill. Douglas and his allies brought a leadership challenge to Lange, whom they regarded as in a weak position, having alienated both the left and right wings of the Labour Party. Caucus brought forward the vote from early 1989 to 21 December in order to avoid the issue dominating headlines over the new year holiday period when there would be little else to report on.

== Public opinion polling ==
Date	Polling organisation	Sample size	David Lange	Roger Douglas	Mike Moore	Geoffrey Palmer	Unsure
19 December 1988	Heylen	500	22%	18%	19%	16%	25%
19 December 1988	Heylen	H2H	47%	37%	—	—	16%
19 December 1988	Heylen	Lab.	43%	36%	—	—	21%

When asked for a choice between only Douglas or David Caygill for whom they preferred as finance minister 49 per cent chose Douglas and 27 per cent opted for Caygill.

== Result ==
Even though many Labour MPs supported the Rogernomics reforms, most weren't prepared to replace the charismatic and witty Lange for Douglas, who was a wooden speaker lacking the common touch. This resulted in Lange defeating Douglas by a wide margin of 38-15. Lange commented that he never felt threatened that Douglas would defeat him and as expected, only the most loyal of Douglas' following supported him, such as Richard Prebble and Trevor De Cleene (The two of them with Douglas would later become known as the Three Musketeers). Two MPs (Jim Anderton and Kerry Burke) were not present and two votes were counted as informal votes. Lange's victory can be summed up by a quote from Geoffrey Palmer who said that he regarded both as essential to the government's well-being.

=== Leadership ballot ===
Candidate	Votes	%
David Lange	38	69.09
Roger Douglas	15	27.27
Informal	2	3.63
Majority	23	41.81
Turnout	55	—N/a

== Caucus members support ==
Some, but not all, voting preferences were known:

Douglas

- Margaret Austin
- Michael Bassett
- David Butcher
- Trevor de Cleene
- Roger Douglas
- Peter Dunne
- Jack Elder
- Peter Neilson
- Richard Prebble
- Ken Shirley
- Jim Sutton
- Bill Sutton
- Koro Wētere

Lange

- Helen Clark
- Michael Cullen
- Jonathan Hunt
- David Lange
- Trevor Mallard
- Mike Moore
- Geoffrey Palmer
- Larry Sutherland
- Elizabeth Tennet
- Bob Tizard
- Allan Wallbank

== Aftermath ==
Douglas congratulated Lange on his win and pledged loyalty to the caucus while stating he would still promote issues he believed in. Several months after this election, the caucus re-elected Douglas to the cabinet in August 1989. Feeling that this served as a motion of no-confidence on his continued leadership, and feeling that he could no longer work with Douglas in cabinet, Lange resigned in August of that year to be replaced by Geoffrey Palmer.

After his resignation, Lange served as Attorney-General (outside cabinet) from 1989 to 1990 and later a backbencher until retiring from Parliament in 1996. Douglas was appointed Minister of Police and Minister of Immigration by Palmer but chose not to contest the 1990 election. Later, in 1994, he co-founded with former National Party MP Derek Quigley the Association of Consumers and Taxpayers which would go on to become ACT New Zealand. Douglas returned to parliament again in 2008 and stood down in 2011.
