= Mike Moore (New Zealand politician) =

Prime Minister of New Zealand in 1990

The Right Honourable Mike Moore ONZ AO
- Official portrait, 1992

34th Prime Minister of New Zealand
- In office 4 September 1990 – 2 November 1990
- Monarch: Elizabeth II
- Governor-General: Paul Reeves
- Deputy: Helen Clark
- Preceded by: Geoffrey Palmer
- Succeeded by: Jim Bolger

3rd Director-General of the World Trade Organization
- In office 1 September 1999 – 1 September 2002
- Preceded by: Renato Ruggiero
- Succeeded by: Supachai Panitchpakdi

16th New Zealand Ambassador to the United States
- In office August 2010 – 16 December 2015
- Prime Minister: John Key
- Preceded by: Roy Ferguson
- Succeeded by: Tim Groser
Senior political offices
26th Leader of the Opposition
In office 2 November 1990 – 1 December 1993
Monarch	Elizabeth II
Prime Minister	Jim Bolger
Deputy	Helen Clark
Preceded by	Jim Bolger
Succeeded by	Helen Clark
11th Leader of the Labour Party
In office 4 September 1990 – 1 December 1993
Deputy	Helen Clark
Preceded by	Geoffrey Palmer
Succeeded by	Helen Clark
Ministerial offices held
10th Minister of Foreign Affairs
In office 9 February 1990 – 2 November 1990
Prime Minister	Geoffrey Palmer; Himself
Preceded by	Russell Marshall
Succeeded by	Don McKinnon
5th Minister of Overseas Trade
In office 26 July 1984 – 2 November 1990
Prime Minister	David Lange; Geoffrey Palmer; Himself
Preceded by	Warren Cooper
Succeeded by	Don McKinnon
25th Minister of Tourism
In office 26 July 1984 – 24 August 1987
Prime Minister	David Lange
Preceded by	Rob Talbot
Succeeded by	Phil Goff
New Zealand Parliament constituencies
In office 25 November 1978 – 31 August 1999
Preceded by	Bert Walker
Succeeded by	Clayton Cosgrove
Constituency	Waimakariri; Christchurch North (1984–1996); Palanui (1978–1984)
In office 25 November 1972 – 29 November 1975
Preceded by	John Rae
Succeeded by	Aussie Malcolm
Constituency	Eden

Personal details
- Born: Michael Kenneth Moore; 28 January 1949 Whakatāne, New Zealand
- Died: 2 February 2020 (aged 71) Auckland, New Zealand
- Party: Labour
- Spouse: Yvonne Dereany (m. 1975)
- Occupation: Politician; union organiser; author
- Website: Website

Michael Kenneth Moore (28 January 1949 – 2 February 2020) was a New Zealand politician, union organiser, and author. In the Fourth Labour Government he served in several portfolios including minister of foreign affairs, and was the 34th prime minister of New Zealand for 59 days before the 1990 general election elected a new parliament. Following Labour's defeat in that election, Moore served as Leader of the Opposition until the 1993 election, after which Helen Clark successfully challenged him for the Labour Party leadership.

Following his retirement from New Zealand politics, Moore was Director-General of the World Trade Organization from 1999 to 2002. He also held the post of New Zealand Ambassador to the United States from 2010 to 2015.

== Early life ==
Michael Kenneth Moore was born on 28 January 1949 in Whakatāne, Bay of Plenty Region, the son of Audrey Evelyn (née Goodall) and Alan George Moore.

He was raised in Moerewa and while aged only two his mother pushed him around town in a pram which concealed Labour Party leaflets, which had been made illegal under the emergency powers enacted during the 1951 waterfront dispute. His father died when he was five years old after which he moved to Dilworth School as a boarder. He was then educated at Bay of Islands College before leaving school at 14 to work as a labourer and then as a printer.

He became an active trade unionist and at the age of 17 was elected to the Auckland Trades Council. He became the first youth representative on the Labour Party executive and was vice-president of the International Union of Socialist Youth for two consecutive terms.

In 1975, he married Yvonne Dereany, a teacher and presenter of the children's television programme Romper Room.

== Political career ==
=== Member of Parliament ===
New Zealand Parliament
Years	Term	Electorate	List	Party
1972–1975	37th	Eden		Labour
1978–1981	39th	Papanui		Labour
1981–1984	40th	Papanui		Labour
1984–1987	41st	Christchurch North		Labour
1987–1990	42nd	Christchurch North		Labour
1990–1993	43rd	Christchurch North		Labour
1993–1996	44th	Christchurch North		Labour
1996–1999	45th	Waimakariri	none	Labour

Moore began his parliamentary career when elected as the MP for Eden in 1972, becoming the youngest MP at 23 years of age, where he served for one term before being defeated in the 1975 election. Following the announcement of Norman Douglas' retirement from the safe Auckland Central seat there was much speculation that Moore would seek the Auckland Central nomination. The media considered Moore one of the most able backbenchers in the Labour Party, however Moore decided to stand in the marginal Eden seat once again. Once again Moore was offered a safer seat when he was approached to replace cabinet minister Hugh Watt in Onehunga, Watt encouraged him and even offered to campaign on Moore's behalf. However Moore declined wishing to remain in Eden to show confidence in Labour and its new leader Bill Rowling's ability to win the election.

After his election loss in Eden, the Moores visited Warren Freer, and were insistent that he resign from Mount Albert so that Moore could take his place. Freer (who retired in 1981) said he had no intention of resigning and further stated there was no guarantee that he would be selected to replace Freer. Moore also developed cancer and had to have surgery to remove cancerous growths. He concealed this from the public fearing he would never win nomination for a seat if his condition was revealed.

Moore was then elected Labour's youth vice-president and proceeded to contest the Labour nomination in the 1977 Mangere by-election following the resignation of Colin Moyle. He was seen as a frontrunner but lost to local lawyer David Lange, who would go on to become Prime Minister in 1984. Several months later Moore then sought to be Labour's candidate in the newly formed Papatoetoe electorate but again missed out on selection against Grey Lynn MP Eddie Isbey. By the time of his second rejection for a candidature in an Auckland seat he had received invitations from Labour Party organisers in 16 electorates elsewhere in New Zealand prompting him to consider moving from Auckland in order to gain re-election to Parliament.

In 1978 Moore moved to Christchurch and was selected as Labour's candidate for the north Christchurch electorate of Papanui. Expecting to lose once again (due to interference from party head office) Moore told party president and vice-president Arthur Faulkner and Joe Walding he did not want to stand in the seat and had only accepted nomination there to test the lengths that the hierarchy would go to stop him. He also told them he was intending to use his acceptance speech to tell the members and media that the party hierarchy 'could stick their nomination up their arses'. During his walk to the podium Moore changed his mind and accepted the candidature as the now relieved Faulkner and Walding looked on.

He defeated Bert Walker to win the seat at the 1978 election. He held the electorate until his retirement in 1999: as Papanui until 1984, as Christchurch North until 1996, and as Waimakariri thereafter. Shortly after his re-election in 1978 he was elevated to Labour's shadow cabinet by leader Bill Rowling. Initially he was passed over for a position, however after fellow MP Richard Prebble refused to join the shadow cabinet, in protest of being given portfolios he did not want, it resulted in Moore taking his place. Labour leader Bill Rowling gave Moore three associate shadow portfolios Social Welfare, Health and Education before being promoted to Shadow Minister of Housing in a reshuffle in 1980 caused by the sacking of Roger Douglas. In March 1981 Moore was promoted to the front bench and was designated Shadow Minister for the Environment and Housing. In a February 1982 reshuffle he retained Housing though lost Environment but was given Customs instead.

In 1983 Moore stood for the deputy leadership of the party. In a three-way contest, in which all candidates were from Christchurch to reflect geographical proportionality, Moore won the first ballot. Lyttelton MP Ann Hercus was eliminated and on the second ballot almost all of her supporters voted for Christchurch Central MP Geoffrey Palmer, who beat Moore by one vote. Leader David Lange later expressed relief at Palmer's success thinking that Moore would have been an un-reassuring deputy due to his inherent ambition. Nevertheless, Lange saw fit to promote Moore to number 3 in the party rankings and appointed him shadow minister of overseas trade and tourism.

=== Cabinet minister ===
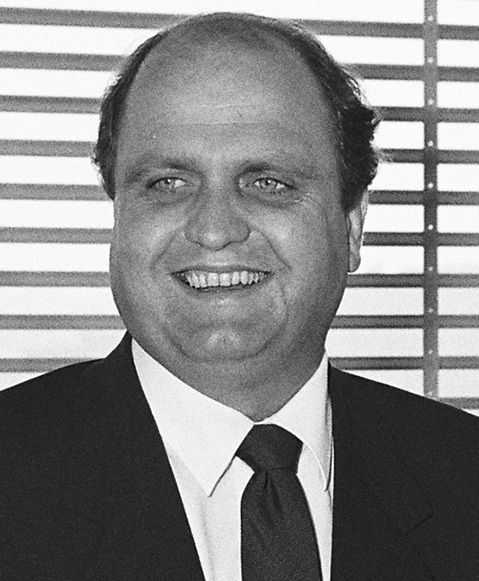
Moore in 1986

As a government minister in the Fourth Labour Government he held numerous portfolios, initially as Minister of Overseas Trade, Minister of Tourism and Minister for Sport and Recreation. He became best known in his role as Overseas Trade Minister from 1984 to 1990 with involvement in the GATT negotiations. He also advanced the Closer Economic Relations (CER) free trade agreement with Australia. In 1988 he became Minister of External Relations and Deputy Minister of Finance. Moore was privately critical of the government’s asset sales agenda, particularly concerned with the surge in unemployment that followed, he even dry-vomited in a toilet after the sale of the Tourist Hotel Corporation. He was also vehemently opposed to finance minister Roger Douglas' proposal for a flat tax rate.

In 1988 Lange recalled Palmer from overseas to be acting Prime Minister to prevent Moore (who was ranked third in cabinet) doing so. Lange later reflected saying "But God alone knew what Moore might do." Moore later said he found the comments to be quite hurtful. When Lange resigned in 1989, Moore stood for the leadership of the party, but was defeated 41 votes to 19 by Palmer. Palmer did give Moore the coveted position of Minister of Foreign Affairs in early 1990. However, Palmer was unable to regain public popularity and resigned just over a year after becoming leader. Moore stood again for the leadership and this time won, defeating backbench MP Richard Northey 41 votes to 19, and consequently became New Zealand's 34th Prime Minister.

=== Prime Minister (1990) ===
- Premiership of Mike Moore; 4 September 1990 – 2 November 1990
- Monarch: Elizabeth II
- Cabinet: Fourth Labour Government of New Zealand
- Party: New Zealand Labour Party
- Appointed by: Paul Reeves
- Seat: Premier House

Moore became Prime Minister for 60 days, having convinced the Labour caucus that, while he could not win the election for Labour, he would help save more seats than had they remained led by Palmer. Moore energetically hit the campaign trail and made an impact immediately by handling hecklers and interjectors visibly better than Palmer had done. His performance closed the gap in the polls between Labour and National to 10%, better than it had been for over a year. In a study of the 1990 election, political scientists Jack Vowles and Peter Aimer, concluded that Moore made an impact on voters who were still then undecided about how they would vote when the campaign began. They stated "The evidence has confirmed the presence of a small electoral effect, consistently in Moore's favour," and that "He attracted some late deciders, probably deterred others from leaving Labour; and those who did leave appeared to do so despite, rather than because of, the leadership change."

Moore giving a speech to reporters, c. 1990

The Labour Government did not return to power in the next election, however. The circumstances of Moore's appointment as prime minister would later be compared to the return of Kevin Rudd as Prime Minister of Australia. In the 1990 election, National won in a landslide, and Labour lost almost 13% of the popular vote, suffering its worst-ever electoral defeat since it first won power in the 1935 election. Following the loss, Moore labelled Labour's last cabinet meeting before the changeover of government 'the last supper'. He left office on 2 November 1990.

=== Leader of the Opposition ===
Moore led the Official Opposition until 1993 and was spokesman on Foreign Affairs and Trade as well. He attempted a rejuvenation of Labour's ranks with several important portfolio shifts, including giving the finance portfolio to Michael Cullen, designed to blunt the growth of the newly formed Alliance party (which was made up largely of Labour dissidents). Despite suffering such a heavy defeat, under Moore's leadership Labour quickly rebounded, assisted by the record unpopularity of the new National Government. By April 1991 Labour registered as the most popular party and Moore was the most 'preferred Prime Minister' in many opinion polls. As leader Moore attempted to establish and maintain close contact with caucus members including the new members through a mix of formal weekly meetings and informal channels such as personally visiting their offices. In the debating chamber he personally congratulated his colleagues when they made good speeches to improve morale.

He then led Labour in the 1993 election where he managed to gain 16 seats, coming within two seats of clinching an unlikely victory just three years after the landslide 1990 defeat. On the night of the 1993 election he delivered a televised speech (dubbed the "long, cold night" speech) later described by political scientist Jack Vowles as "damaging" and "more appropriate for a decisive Labour win than a narrow defeat."

Results of the cachs vote of the 1993 Labour Party leadership election which Moore lost to his deputy Helen Clark

Moore said he was pleased with the result, thinking Labour was back in striking distance of forming a government in the future, and believed the result might give him a chance to retain the leadership. However he was deposed as leader at the first post-election caucus meeting by his deputy Helen Clark. His replacement did not surprise him, but he felt begrudged that he was given little appreciation, thinking he would "... have got thanks – then axed [but] the axe went before even 'thank yous'." The irony was not lost on Moore that Clark's allies had installed candidates in the seats Labour had picked up from his campaign who then voted to replace him, making his success the architect of his own downfall.

=== Backbencher ===
Moore declined any portfolios offered to him by Clark when she assembled her shadow cabinet, opting to sit on the backbench instead, frequently sniping at Clark in the house. After the 1993 referendum to adopt mixed-member proportional representation (MMP) Moore considered forming a break-away party, the New Zealand Democratic Coalition, for the 1996 MMP election, but then decided against it. He received countless letters in support of a new party, but despite his ousting as leader, he felt too much affinity to the Labour Party to ever leave it. He won his seat in the 1996 election, obtaining more than twice as many votes as the next-highest candidate, National's Jim Gerard.

Also after losing the leadership, Moore defended the record Fourth Labour Government and was critical of subsequent leaders of the party denigrating its record. He thought that Clark and Cullen's semi-repudiation of Rogernomics was conducted purely to make themselves look better and labelled their remembrances as 'manufactured history'. Clark performed poorly in opinion polls after becoming leader and by early 1996 there was an active movement within Labour to replace her either with Moore or frontbencher Phil Goff. Clark stared down the challengers and remained leader when Cullen shifted his allegiance to Clark after becoming deputy leader. Moore, who still held leadership ambitions, refused to comment on the positional change, saying only that he did not contest the deputy leadership because he was "a leader, not a deputy" but was eventually promoted to the frontbench by Clark in a surprise move. In September 1996 Moore accepted Clark's long-standing offer of the position of Shadow Minister of Foreign Affairs and Overseas Trade, saying he could no longer stay "on the sidelines".

In 1998, he ran for the post of Director-General of the World Trade Organization and was elected to this position on 22 July 1999, taking up the post on 1 September 1999 which was close enough to the 1999 election to not trigger a by-election.

=== Political positions held ===
- Member of Parliament for Eden, 1972–75.
- Member of Parliament for Waimakariri (formerly Papanui and Christchurch North), 1978–99.
- Minister of Tourism, Sport and Recreation, 1984–87.
- Chairman of the Cabinet Economic Development and Employment Committee, 1984–90.
- Minister of External Relations and Trade, 1988–90.
- Minister for the America's Cup, 1988–90.
- Deputy Minister of Finance, 1988–90.
- Minister of Overseas Trade and Marketing, 1984–90.
- Prime Minister of New Zealand, 1990.
- Leader of the New Zealand Labour Party, 1990–93.
- Leader of the Opposition, 1990–93.
- Opposition Spokesperson on Foreign Affairs and Overseas Trade, 1996–99.

== World Trade Organization ==
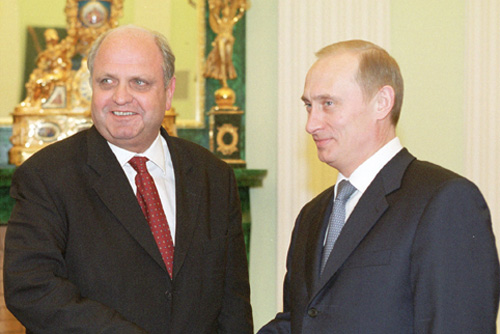
Moore as Director-General of the WTO meets Russian President Vladimir Putin, 2001

Moore was Director-General of the World Trade Organization from 1999 to 2002. This was the highest ever ranking job in international bureaucracy held by a New Zealander. The deal with his rival and successor Supachai Panitchpakdi meant that he served only half of the usual six-year term in the post. Moore's term coincided with momentous changes in the global economy and multilateral trading system. He attempted to restore confidence in the system following the setback of the 1999 WTO ministerial conference held in Seattle.

Ministers at the 2001 ministerial conference in Doha, Qatar, regarded him as the driving force behind the decision to launch a new round of multilateral trade negotiations—the ill-fated Doha Development Round. That 2001 meeting also saw the successful accession to the WTO of China and Taiwan, which along with Estonia, Jordan, Georgia, Albania, Oman, Croatia, Lithuania and Moldova joined during Moore's term, bringing the majority of the world's population within the rules-based trading system. He gave particular attention to helping poor countries participate effectively in the multilateral trading system.

== Later life and death ==
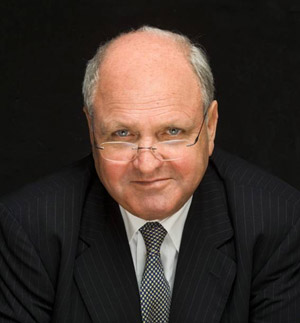
Moore in 2007

Moore became New Zealand Ambassador to the United States in 2010. He had a heart valve operation in 2014 and was admitted to hospital in Washington DC in April 2015 after a mild stroke. In November 2015, he announced that he would leave his post on 16 December and return to New Zealand due to his deteriorating health.

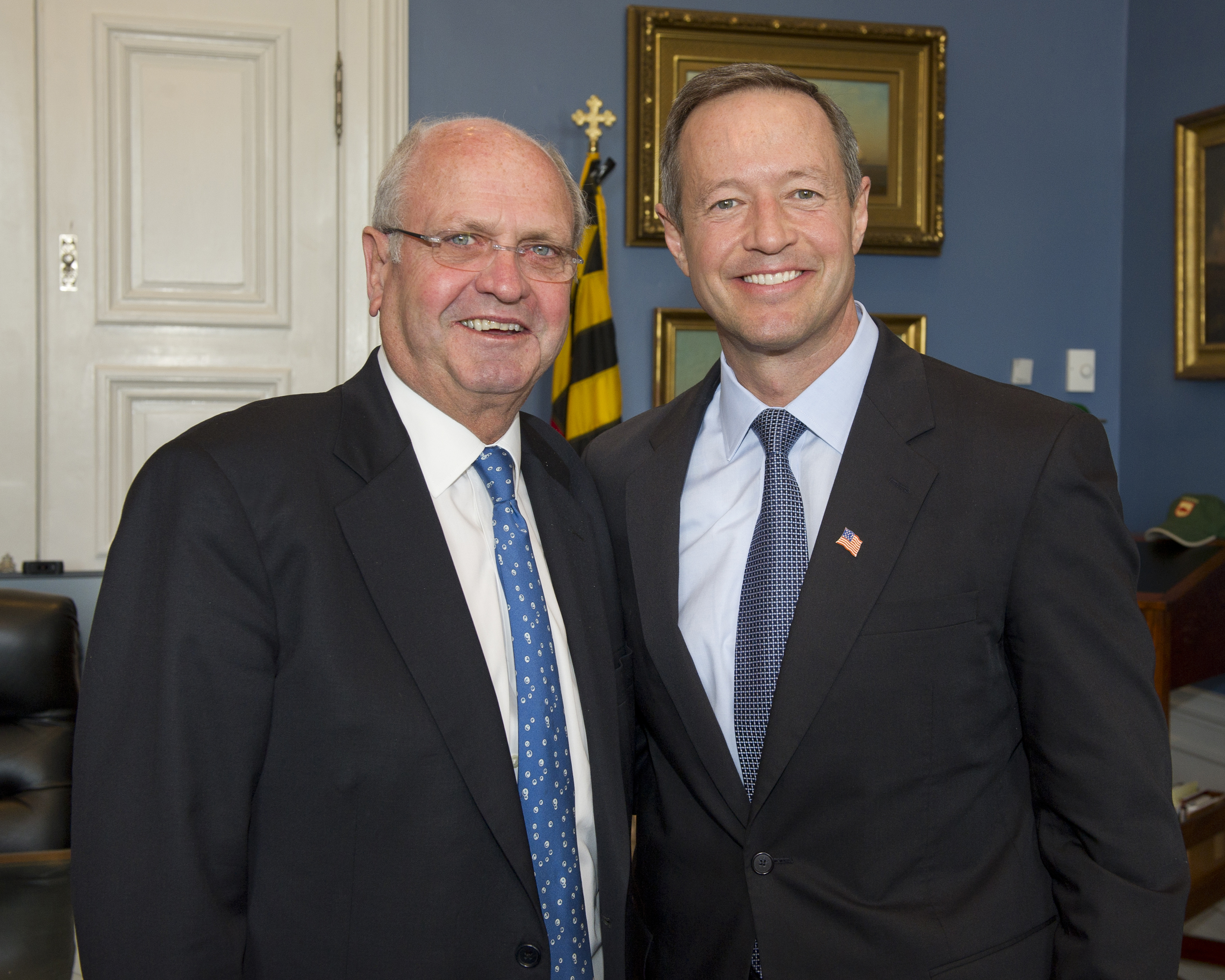
Moore visits Maryland Governor Martin O'Malley in Annapolis, Maryland, 2012

Moore was a supporter of the Campaign for the Establishment of a United Nations Parliamentary Assembly.

Moore died at his home in Auckland on 2 February 2020, aged 71.

== International services and appointments ==
- Commissioner, United Nations Commission on the Legal Empowerment of the Poor
- Commissioner, Global Commission on International Migration
- Director General of the World Trade Organization, 1999–2002
- Member, Global Leadership Foundation
- Senior Counsellor, Fonterra
- Member, Trilateral Commission
- Member, Economic Development Board, South Australia
- New Zealand Government Trade Envoy
- Special Advisor to the United Nations Global Compact for Business and Development
- Former Board Member to the Gottlieb Duttweiler Institute
- Member, Board of Governors for the Institute for International Business, Economics and Law, University of Adelaide
- Adjunct Professor, La Trobe University, Melbourne, Australia
- Adjunct Professor, University of Adelaide, South Australia
- Chairperson, Advisory Board of Carnegie Mellon University, Adelaide
- Honorary Professor, Beijing Normal University, Zhuhai
- Honorary Professor, Chinese University for Political Science and International Law, Beijing
- Honorary Professor, Shanghai Customs College
- Honorary President, Beijing Afforestation Foundation.
- Special Advisor, China Institute for Reform and Development's World Trade Organization Reference Centre.
- CEO, The Moore Group International Ltd.

== Publications ==
Moore is an author of a number of books, on subjects ranging from politics to the Pacific. His book A World Without Walls has been published in Chinese and Turkish. He had a regular newspaper column that appeared in five countries.

- On Balance: a Labour Look at Regional, Community and Town Development
- Beyond Today
- A Pacific Parliament: A Pacific Idea—an Economic and Political Community for the South Pacific (Asia Pacific Books, 1982)
- Hard Labour (Penguin Books, 1987)
- Children of the Poor: How poverty could destroy New Zealand's future (Canterbury University Press, 1996)
- A Brief History of the Future: Citizenship of the Millennium (Shoal Bay Press, 1998)
- A World Without Walls: Freedom, Development, Free Trade, and Global Governance (Cambridge University Press, 2003)
- Saving Globalization (Wiley, 2009)
- The Added Value Economy
- Beyond Tomorrow
- Fighting for New Zealand
- Labour of Love, New Zealand: a Nation That Can Work Again

== Honours and awards ==
=== New Zealand honours ===
- New Zealand 1990 Commemoration Medal (1990)
- Order of New Zealand (1999)

=== Foreign honours ===
- Commander of the Order of the Equatorial Star (2000) – Government of Gabon
- Chancellor's Medal (Medalla Rectoral) – University of Chile
- National Order of the Ivory Coast (2002) – Government of the Ivory Coast
- Order of the Golden Heart of Kenya (2002) – Government of Kenya
- Order of Duke Branimir with Ribbon (June 2002) – Republic of Croatia
- National Honour of Georgia (July 2002) – Government of Georgia
- Medal of the Oriental Republic of Uruguay (August 2002) – Government of Uruguay – highest national honour
- Pope John Paul II Annual Medal (August 2002) – The Holy See
- Honorary Officer of the Order of Australia for service to the South Australian Government by developing initiatives in economic reform and for service to the education sector

=== Honorary degrees ===
- Honorary Doctorate in Commerce – Lincoln University, New Zealand
- Honorary Doctorate in Economics – People's University of China, Beijing
- Honorary Doctorate in Commerce – Auckland University of Technology, Auckland, New Zealand
- Honorary Doctorate in Commerce – University of Canterbury, Christchurch, New Zealand
- Honorary Doctorate in Law – La Trobe University, Melbourne, Australia

== Notes ==
Government offices
Preceded by Geoffrey Palmer	Prime Minister of New Zealand; 1990	Succeeded by Jim Bolger
Political offices
Preceded by Jim Bolger	Leader of the Opposition; 1990–1993	Succeeded by Helen Clark
Preceded by Russell Marshall	Minister of Foreign Affairs; 1990	Succeeded by Don McKinnon
Preceded by Warren Cooper	Minister of Overseas Trade; 1984–1990	Succeeded by Don McKinnon
Preceded by Rob Talbot	Minister of Tourism; 1984–1987	Succeeded by Phil Goff
Preceded by Allan Highet	Minister for Sport and Recreation; 1984–1987	Succeeded by Peter Tapsell
New Zealand Parliament
Preceded by John Rae	Member of Parliament for Eden; 1972–1975	Succeeded by Aussie Malcolm
Preceded by Bert Walker	Member of Parliament for Papanui; 1978–1984	Constituency abolished
Vacant Constituency recreated after abolition in 1946 Title last held by Sidney Holland	Member of Parliament for Christchurch North; 1984–1996	Constituency abolished
New constituency	Member of Parliament for Waimakariri; 1996–1999	Succeeded by Clayton Cosgrove
Party political offices
Preceded by Geoffrey Palmer	Leader of the Labour Party; 1990–1993	Succeeded by Helen Clark
Diplomatic posts
Preceded by Renato Ruggiero	Director-General of the World Trade Organization; 1999–2002	Succeeded by Supachai Panitchpakdi
Preceded by Roy Ferguson	Ambassador to the United States; 2010–2015	Succeeded by Carl Worker
