= Roberto Azevêdo =

Former Director-General of the World Trade Organization

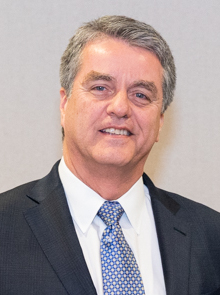
- Azevêdo in 2020

6th Director-General of the World Trade Organization
- In office 1 September 2013 – 31 August 2020
- Preceded by: Pascal Lamy
- Succeeded by: Ngozi Okonjo-Iweala

Personal details
- Born: Roberto Carvalho de Azevêdo; 3 October 1957 (age 68) Salvador, Brazil
- Party: Independent
- Spouse: Maria Nazareth Farani
- Children: 2
- Education: University of Brasília; Rio Branco Institute

Roberto Carvalho de Azevêdo (Portuguese pronunciation: [ʁoˈbɛʁtu kaʁˈvaʎu dʒi azeˈvedu]; born 3 October 1957) is a Brazilian career diplomat who served as Director-General of the World Trade Organization (WTO) from 2013 until 2020. Since 2020, he has been Executive Vice President and Director of Corporate Affairs at PepsiCo.

Azevêdo was elected to succeed Pascal Lamy as Director-General of the World Trade Organization in May 2013. On 14 May 2020, he announced publicly via a teleconference that he would resign on 31 August the same year, just a year before his second four-year term as Director-General expired.

== Early life and education ==
Azevêdo graduated in Electrical Engineering from the University of Brasília and in International Relations at the Rio Branco Institute. Besides his native Portuguese, he is fluent in English, French and Spanish.

== Career ==
His first diplomatic posting was to Washington, D.C., United States, in 1988. He subsequently served in the Brazilian embassy in Montevideo, Uruguay, before being assigned to the Permanent Mission of Brazil in Geneva, Switzerland, in 1997.

In 2001 Roberto Carvalho de Azevêdo was named head of the Brazilian Foreign Ministry's Dispute Settlement Unit where he remained until 2005. During his tenure he acted as chief litigator in many disputes at the WTO and served on WTO dispute settlement panels.

From 2006 to 2008, he was Vice-Minister for Economic and Technical Affairs at the Foreign Ministry in Brasilia. In that capacity, he was Brazil's chief trade negotiator for the Doha Round and represented Brazil in MERCOSUR negotiations.

In 2008, he was appointed Brazil's Ambassador in Geneva to the United Nations’ international organizations and Permanent Representative to the WTO.

Ambassador Azevêdo has been a frequent lecturer on topics related to international economics and has published numerous articles on these issues.

=== Director General of the World Trade Organization ===
In May 2013 Azevêdo was appointed to succeed Pascal Lamy as the WTO's Director General, with a term beginning 1 September 2013. There were nine nominated candidates for the role, Azevêdo being considered the "insider's candidate" preferred by developing economies. His opponent, Mexican Herminio Blanco, was considered to have been the preferred candidate of richer nations. The Brazilian government pre-empted the official announcement of the WTO and stated that Azevêdo had won by a wide margin.

The official announcement from the WTO's three-person committee for selecting the Director-General was published on 8 May 2013, declaring Azevêdo as the emergent consensus candidate from several rounds of consultation. The formal election occurred at the General Council meeting on 14 May.

Unlike his predecessors in the position, Azevêdo had been a WTO ambassador rather than a minister before taking office. Under his leadership, the WTO agreed to the Bali Package in December 2013. He was reelected on 28 February 2017 and started his second term on 1 September 2017.

Also under Azevêdo, the organization deliberately kept a low profile during the COVID-19 pandemic, staying largely silent over the export restrictions on medical equipment.

At a virtual meeting of all WTO members on 14 May 2020, Azevêdo announced that he would step down on 31 August, cutting his second term short by exactly one year.

== Other activities ==
- International Gender Champions (IGC), Member

== Personal life ==
Azevêdo is married to Ambassador Maria Nazareth Farani Azevêdo, a Brazilian career diplomat like himself. She is currently (2020) head of the Brazilian permanent mission to the United Nations Office at Geneva, and they have two daughters.

Diplomatic posts
Preceded by Pascal Lamy	Director-General of the World Trade Organization; 2013–2020	Succeeded by Ngozi Okonjo-Iweala
