= Electoral history of Geoffrey Palmer =

List of elections featuring Geoffrey Palmer as a candidate

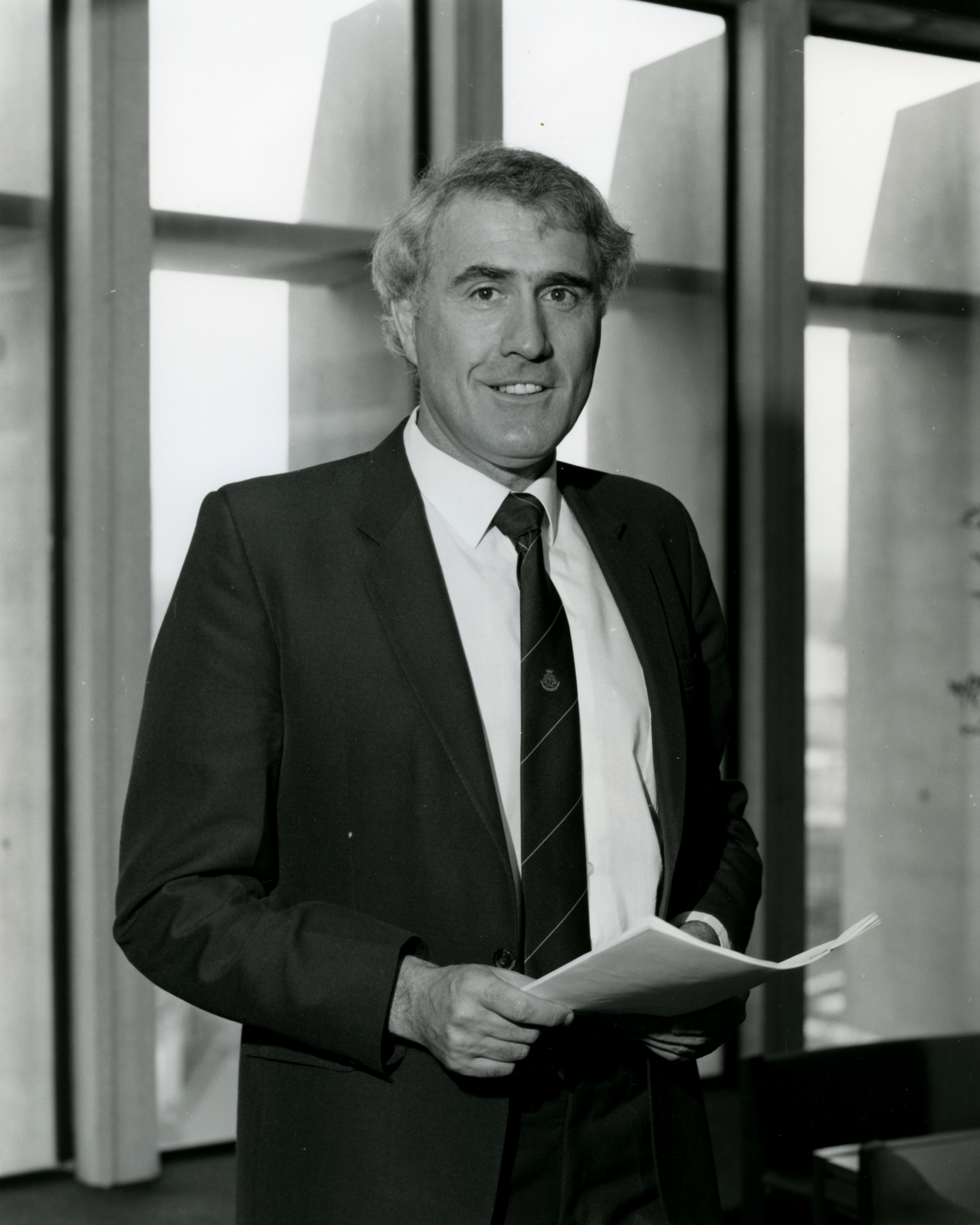
Geoffrey Palmer in 1986.

This is a summary of the electoral history of Geoffrey Palmer, Prime Minister of New Zealand (1989–90), Leader of the Labour Party (1989–90), Member of Parliament for Christchurch Central (1979–90).

== Parliamentary elections ==
=== 1979 by-election ===
1979 Christchurch Central by-election
Party	Candidate	Votes	%	±%
Labour	Geoffrey Palmer	6,149	64.20	+3.03
Social Credit	Terry Heffernan	1,759	18.37	+9.02
National	David Duncan	1,634	17.06	−8.55
Tory	Suzanne Sadler	26	0.27	
Economic Euthenics	Tubby Hansen	10	0.10	
Majority		4,390	45.83	+10.27
Turnout		9,578	36.00	
Registered electors		26,605		
Labour hold		Swing	+11.58	

=== 1981 election ===
General election, 1981: Christchurch Central
Party	Candidate	Votes	%	±%
Labour	Geoffrey Palmer	10,793	63.25	−0.95
National	Ian Wilson	3,765	22.06	
Social Credit	Peter Admore	2,426	14.21	
Independent	Warwick Iversen	78	0.45	
Majority		7,028	41.19	−4.64
Turnout		17,062	85.10	+49.10
Registered electors		20,048		

=== 1984 election ===
General election, 1984: Christchurch Central
Party	Candidate	Votes	%	±%
Labour	Geoffrey Palmer	13,394	63.36	+0.11
National	Tony Willy	4,886	23.11	
NZ Party	Murray Ludemann	2,072	9.80	
Social Credit	Joe Pounsford	662	3.13	
Independent	Suzanne Sadler	123	0.58	
Majority		8,508	40.25	−0.94
Turnout		21,137	89.56	+4.46
Registered electors		23,599		

=== 1987 election ===
General election, 1987: Christchurch Central
Party	Candidate	Votes	%	±%
Labour	Geoffrey Palmer	11,836	65.28	+1.92
National	Graham Burnett	5,031	27.75	
Democrats	Joe Pounsford	557	3.07	+0.06
Breakfast Party	James Daniels	235	1.29	
Socialist Action	Felicity Brereton	196	1.08	
Wizard Party	David Hanlon	119	0.65	
Values	Stephen Symons	85	0.46	
NZ Party	Lynn Yeoman	70	0.38	
Majority		6,805	37.53	−2.72
Turnout		18,129	82.24	−7.32
Registered electors		22,043		

== Leadership elections ==
=== 1983 Deputy-leadership election ===
First ballot

Candidate	Votes	%
Mike Moore	19	44.18
Geoffrey Palmer	15	34.88
Ann Hercus	9	20.93
Majority	4	9.30
Turnout	43	—

Second ballot

Candidate	Votes	%
Geoffrey Palmer	22	51.17
Mike Moore	21	48.83
Majority	1	2.32
Turnout	43	—

=== 1989 Leadership election ===
Candidate	Votes	%
Geoffrey Palmer	41	75.92
Mike Moore	13	24.08
Majority	28	51.85
Turnout	54	—
