= Christchurch Central =

- Single-member general constituency for the New Zealand House of Representatives
- Interactive map of boundaries from the 2026 election
- Formation: 1946
- Region: Canterbury
- Character: Urban and suburban
- Term: 3 years

Member for Christchurch Central
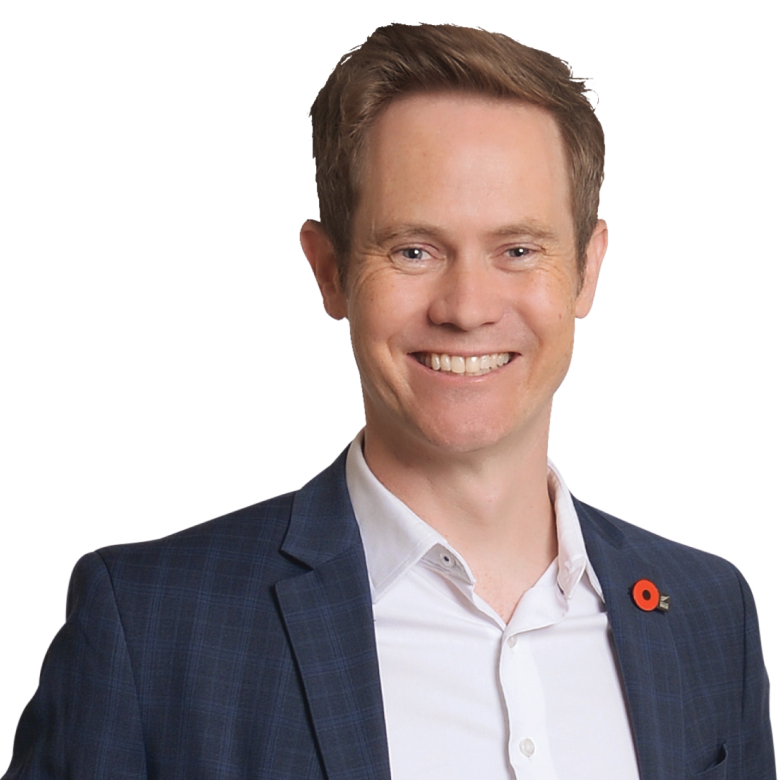
- George Hampton since 7 November 2026
- Party: Labour
- List MPs: Kahurangi Carter (Green)
- Previous MP: Nicky Wagner (National)
Party vote distribution

Christchurch Central is a New Zealand parliamentary electorate in the South Island city of Christchurch. The electorate was established for the 1946 election and, until 2011 had always been won by the Labour Party. Since 2008, the incumbent was Brendon Burns but the election night results for the 2011 election resulted in a tie; the special vote results combined with a judicial recount revealed a 47-vote majority for Nicky Wagner, the National list MP based in the electorate. Wagner significantly increased her winning margin in the 2014 election after having declared the electorate "unwinnable" for National earlier in the year following a boundary review. At the 2017 election, Wagner lost the seat to Labour's Duncan Webb, who has retained it since the 2020 election.

== Population centres ==
The 1941 New Zealand census had been postponed due to World War II, so the 1946 electoral redistribution had to take ten years of population growth and movements into account. The North Island gained a further two electorates from the South Island due to faster population growth. The abolition of the country quota through the Electoral Amendment Act, 1945 reduced the number and increased the size of rural electorates. None of the existing electorates remained unchanged, 27 electorates were abolished, eight former electorates were re-established, and 19 electorates were created for the first time, including Christchurch Central.

As the name suggests, the electorate covers the Christchurch Central City, plus several inner suburbs to the north and east of the central city. Since the 2008 election, the following suburbs, in alphabetical order, are at least partially located in the electorate: Avonside, Central City, Edgeware, Linwood, Mairehau, Merivale, Northcote, Papanui, Phillipstown, Redwood, Richmond, Shirley, St Albans, Sydenham, and Waltham. In the 2013/14 redistribution, the electorate lost Mairehau and Shirley to Christchurch East and gained more of Sydenham and Beckenham from Port Hills and more of Redwood from Waimakariri. In the 2025 boundary review, the electorate would gain the Addington-Spreydon suburban area from Wigram while transferring parts of Linwood-Phillipstown and Northcote to Christchurch East and Ilam respectively.

== History ==
The Christchurch Central electorate was created in 1946. Labour held the seat for the next 65 years, though a high turnout for the Alliance saw Tim Barnett's 1996 majority come in at under a thousand. The incumbent, Brendon Burns, had a majority in the 2008 election of also just under one thousand.

The first representative was Robert Macfarlane, who had earlier represented the Christchurch South electorate. He held Christchurch Central until the 1969 election, when he retired. He was succeeded by Bruce Barclay, who died in office in 1979. This caused the 1979 by-election held on 18 August, which was won by Geoffrey Palmer. Palmer eventually went on to become Prime Minister.

Palmer retired at the 1990 election and was succeeded by Lianne Dalziel. At the 1996 election, i.e. with the advent of MMP, Dalziel did not contest an electorate but stood as a list candidate only. Tim Barnett succeeded her and held the electorate until the 2008 election, when he retired. Brendon Burns succeeded Barnett.

The election night results for the 2011 election resulted in a tie; Burns and Nicky Wagner of the National Party received 10,493 votes each. The outcome of the election thus depended on the special votes. This was the first time a tie result had been achieved since 1928. When the final vote count was announced on 10 December, Wagner was declared the winner with a majority of 45 over Burns, making the result the second-smallest majority after Waitakere. Due to the closeness of the results a judicial recount was held where Wagner's majority increased by 2 votes to 47.

Map of boundaries at the 2020 and 2023 general elections

When draft electoral boundary changes were released, Wagner declared the electorate "unwinnable" for National. Although she was expected to not contest the 2014 general election, she announced at the end of January 2014 that she would try to defend her seat. Labour chose Tony Milne as their candidate for Christchurch Central. Wagner had a 2,420 majority over Milne. The Labour Party chose Duncan Webb as its candidate for the 2017 general election. He is a prominent lawyer and earthquake claims advocate. Webb narrowly won the seat in 2017, and massively increased his majority at the 2020 election amid that year's Labour landslide.

=== Members of Parliament ===
Christchurch Central has been represented by eight MPs. Since its creation in 1946 until the 2011 general election it had been a safe seat for the Labour Party. It was then held by the National Party until the 2017 general election when it swung back to Labour.

Key Labour Alliance NZ First National

| Election | Winner |
|---|---|
| 1946 election | Robert Macfarlane |
| 1949 election | Robert Macfarlane |
| 1951 election | Robert Macfarlane |
| 1954 election | Robert Macfarlane |
| 1957 election | Robert Macfarlane |
| 1960 election | Robert Macfarlane |
| 1963 election | Robert Macfarlane |
| 1966 election | Robert Macfarlane |
| 1969 election | Bruce Barclay |
| 1972 election | Bruce Barclay |
| 1975 election | Bruce Barclay |
| 1978 election | Bruce Barclay |
| 1979 by-election | Geoffrey Palmer |
| 1981 election | Geoffrey Palmer |
| 1984 election | Geoffrey Palmer |
| 1987 election | Geoffrey Palmer |
| 1990 election | Lianne Dalziel |
| 1993 election | Lianne Dalziel |
| 1996 election | Tim Barnett |
| 1999 election | Tim Barnett |
| 2002 election | Tim Barnett |
| 2005 election | Tim Barnett |
| 2008 election | Brendon Burns |
| 2011 election | Nicky Wagner |
| 2014 election | Nicky Wagner |
| 2017 election | Duncan Webb |
| 2020 election | Duncan Webb |
| 2023 election | Duncan Webb |
| 2026 election | George Hampton |

=== List MPs ===
Members of Parliament elected from party lists in elections where that person also unsuccessfully contested the Christchurch Central electorate.

| Election | Winner |
|---|---|
| 1996 election | Ron Mark |
| 1996 election | Liz Gordon |
| 1999 election | Liz Gordon |
| 2005 election | Nicky Wagner |
| 2008 election | Nicky Wagner |
| 2017 election | Nicky Wagner |
| 2023 election | Kahurangi Carter |

== Election results ==
=== 2026 election ===
The next election will be held on 7 November 2026. Candidates for Christchurch Central are listed at Christchurch Central. Official results will be available after 27 November 2026.

=== 2023 election ===
2023 general election: Christchurch Central
| Notes: | Blue background denotes the winner of the electorate vote. Pink background denotes a candidate elected from their party list. Yellow background denotes an electorate win by a list member, or other incumbent. A ✓ or ✗ denotes status of any incumbent, win or lose respectively. | | | | | | |
| Party | Candidate | Votes | % | ±% | Party votes | % | ±% |
|---|---|---|---|---|---|---|---|
| Labour | ✓ Duncan Webb | 15,553 | 39.68 | −19.60 | 11,357 | 28.49 | −24.73 |
| National | Dale Stephens | 13,712 | 34.98 | +10.62 | 12,403 | 31.11 | +11.66 |
| Green | Kahurangi Carter | 5,441 | 13.88 | +7.49 | 7,746 | 19.43 | +6.74 |
| NZ First | Mark Arneil | 1,563 | 3.98 | +2.63 | 2,073 | 5.20 | +3.08 |
| ACT | Matthew Fisken | 1,395 | 3.55 | +0.90 | 2,646 | 6.63 | +0.48 |
| Legalise Cannabis | Michael Britnell | 680 | 1.73 | −0.01 | 174 | 0.43 | −0.20 |
| Animal Justice | Sarah Jackson | 376 | 0.95 | | 106 | 0.26 | |
| Opportunities | | | | | 2,042 | 5.12 | +2.93 |
| Te Pāti Māori | | | | | 405 | 1.01 | +0.66 |
| NZ Loyal | | | | | 253 | 0.63 | |
| NewZeal | | | | | 108 | 0.27 | +0.04 |
| DemocracyNZ | | | | | 82 | 0.20 | |
| New Conservative | | | | | 78 | 0.19 | −0.98 |
| Freedoms NZ | | | | | 71 | 0.17 | |
| Women's Rights | | | | | 59 | 0.14 | |
| Leighton Baker Party | | | | | 51 | 0.12 | |
| New Nation | | | | | 36 | 0.09 | |
| Informal votes | | 472 | | | 166 | | |
| Total valid votes | | 39,192 | | | 39,856 | | |
| Turnout | | 39,856 | | | | | |
| Labour hold | Majority | 1,841 | 4.56 | −30.36 | | | |

=== 2020 election ===
2020 general election: Christchurch Central
| Notes: | Blue background denotes the winner of the electorate vote. Pink background denotes a candidate elected from their party list. Yellow background denotes an electorate win by a list member, or other incumbent. A ✓ or ✗ denotes status of any incumbent, win or lose respectively. | | | | | | |
| Party | Candidate | Votes | % | ±% | Party votes | % | ±% |
|---|---|---|---|---|---|---|---|
| Labour | ✓ Duncan Webb | 23,931 | 59.28 | +11.81 | 21,681 | 53.22 | +12.65 |
| National | Dale Stephens | 9,833 | 24.36 | −14.91 | 7,921 | 19.45 | −19.49 |
| Green | Chrys Horn | 2,566 | 6.36 | +0.78 | 5,168 | 12.69 | +2.95 |
| ACT | Abigail Johnson | 1,071 | 2.65 | — | 2,507 | 6.15 | +5.72 |
| Legalise Cannabis | Michael Britnell | 704 | 1.74 | +0.88 | 257 | 0.63 | +0.33 |
| NZ First | Mark Arneil | 544 | 1.35 | −1.76 | 862 | 2.12 | −3.09 |
| New Conservative | Benjamin Price | 430 | 1.07 | — | 478 | 1.17 | +0.91 |
| Advance NZ | Carole Church | 355 | 0.88 | — | 325 | 0.80 | — |
| ONE | Ken Webb | 143 | 0.35 | — | 92 | 0.23 | — |
| Independent | Hayden Laurie | 93 | 0.23 | — | | | |
| Opportunities | | | | | 887 | 2.19 | −1.29 |
| Māori Party | | | | | 142 | 0.35 | −0.03 |
| Outdoors | | | | | 24 | 0.06 | +0.01 |
| Sustainable NZ | | | | | 24 | 0.06 | — |
| Vision NZ | | | | | 22 | 0.05 | — |
| Social Credit | | | | | 20 | 0.05 | +0.04 |
| TEA | | | | | 11 | 0.03 | — |
| Heartland | | | | | 2 | 0.005 | — |
| Informal votes | | 699 | | | 312 | | |
| Total valid votes | | 40,369 | | | 40,735 | | |
| Turnout | | 40,735 | | | | | |
| Labour hold | Majority | 14,098 | 34.92 | +26.72 | | | |

=== 2017 election ===
2017 general election: Christchurch Central
| Notes: | Blue background denotes the winner of the electorate vote. Pink background denotes a candidate elected from their party list. Yellow background denotes an electorate win by a list member, or other incumbent. A ✓ or ✗ denotes status of any incumbent, win or lose respectively. | | | | | | |
| Party | Candidate | Votes | % | ±% | Party votes | % | ±% |
|---|---|---|---|---|---|---|---|
| Labour | Duncan Webb | 16,631 | 47.47 | +8.54 | 14,541 | 40.57 | +14.31 |
| National | ✗ Nicky Wagner | 13,760 | 39.27 | −6.95 | 13,956 | 38.94 | −5.72 |
| Green | Peter Richardson | 1,957 | 5.58 | −2.85 | 3,492 | 9.74 | −6.08 |
| NZ First | Phil Robinson | 1,091 | 3.11 | −0.64 | 1,869 | 5.21 | −1.98 |
| Opportunities | Doug Hill | 879 | 2.50 | — | 1,246 | 3.47 | — |
| Legalise Cannabis | Janine Shufflebotham | 304 | 0.86 | — | 108 | 0.30 | −0.18 |
| United Future | Ian Gaskin | 80 | 0.22 | — | 45 | 0.12 | −0.05 |
| ACT | | | | | 155 | 0.43 | −0.06 |
| Māori Party | | | | | 139 | 0.38 | −0.08 |
| Conservative | | | | | 94 | 0.26 | −2.85 |
| Outdoors | | | | | 21 | 0.05 | — |
| Ban 1080 | | | | | 21 | 0.05 | −0.03 |
| People's Party | | | | | 16 | 0.04 | — |
| Mana Party | | | | | 11 | 0.03 | −1.00 (Note: 2017 Mana Party swing is relative to the votes for Internet-Mana in 2014; it shared a party list with the Internet Party in the 2014 election) |
| Internet | | | | | 8 | 0.02 | −1.01 (Note: 2017 Internet Party swing is relative to the votes for Internet-Mana in 2014; it shared a party list with Mana Party in the 2014 election) |
| Democrats | | | | | 5 | 0.01 | −0.08 |
| Informal votes | | 331 | | | 111 | | |
| Total valid votes | | 35,033 | | | 35,838 | | |
| Turnout | | 36,220 | 81.01 | +2.51 | | | |
| Labour gain from National | Majority | 2,871 | 8.20 | +15.49 | | | |

=== 2014 election ===
2014 general election: Christchurch Central
| Notes: | Blue background denotes the winner of the electorate vote. Pink background denotes a candidate elected from their party list. Yellow background denotes an electorate win by a list member, or other incumbent. A ✓ or ✗ denotes status of any incumbent, win or lose respectively. | | | | | | |
| Party | Candidate | Votes | % | ±% | Party votes | % | ±% |
|---|---|---|---|---|---|---|---|
| National | ✓ Nicky Wagner | 15,346 | 46.22 | +1.69 | 15,301 | 44.66 | +0.03 |
| Labour | Tony Milne | 12,926 | 38.93 | −5.43 | 8,995 | 26.25 | −3.15 |
| Green | David Moorhouse | 2,800 | 8.43 | −0.14 | 5,419 | 15.82 | −0.44 |
| NZ First | George Abraham | 1,245 | 3.75 | +3.75 | 2,462 | 7.19 | +2.23 |
| Conservative | Michael Cooke | 598 | 1.80 | +0.18 | 1,065 | 3.11 | +1.37 |
| ACT | Toni Severin | 122 | 0.37 | −0.04 | 167 | 0.49 | −0.29 |
| Māori Party | Lenis Davidson | 109 | 0.33 | +0.33 | 157 | 0.46 | −0.04 |
| Democrats | Robin Columbus | 57 | 0.17 | +0.17 | 30 | 0.09 | +0.06 |
| Internet Mana | | | | | 353 | 1.03 | +0.67 (Note: 2014 Internet Mana swing is relative to the votes for Mana in 2011; it shared a party list with Internet in the 2014 election.) |
| Legalise Cannabis | | | | | 165 | 0.48 | −0.16 |
| United Future | | | | | 79 | 0.23 | −0.31 |
| Civilian | | | | | 40 | 0.12 | +0.12 |
| Ban 1080 | | | | | 27 | 0.08 | +0.08 |
| Independent Coalition | | | | | 3 | 0.01 | +0.01 |
| Focus | | | | | 1 | 0.00 | +0.00 |
| Informal votes | | 281 | | | 108 | | |
| Total valid votes | | 33,203 | | | 34,264 | | |
| Turnout | | 34,480 | 78.01 | +6.32 | | | |
| National hold | Majority | 2,420 | 7.29 | +7.12 | | | |

=== 2011 election ===
2011 general election: Christchurch Central
| Notes: | Blue background denotes the winner of the electorate vote. Pink background denotes a candidate elected from their party list. Yellow background denotes an electorate win by a list member, or other incumbent. A ✓ or ✗ denotes status of any incumbent, win or lose respectively. | | | | | | |
| Party | Candidate | Votes | % | ±% | Party votes | % | ±% |
|---|---|---|---|---|---|---|---|
| National | Nicky Wagner | 12,064 | 44.53 | +3.61 | 12,506 | 44.63 | +7.05 |
| Labour | ✗ Brendon Burns | 12,017 | 44.36 | +0.52 | 8,240 | 29.40 | −9.96 |
| Green | David Moorhouse | 2,321 | 8.57 | +0.14 | 4,556 | 16.26 | +5.09 |
| Conservative | Michael Cooke | 439 | 1.62 | +1.62 | 487 | 1.74 | +1.74 |
| Independent | Luke Chandler | 138 | 0.51 | +0.51 | | | |
| ACT | Toni Severin | 110 | 0.41 | −1.09 | 219 | 0.78 | −1.93 |
| NZ First | | | | | 1,391 | 4.96 | +1.83 |
| Legalise Cannabis | | | | | 180 | 0.64 | +0.08 |
| United Future | | | | | 151 | 0.54 | −0.18 |
| Māori Party | | | | | 139 | 0.50 | −0.20 |
| Mana | | | | | 100 | 0.36 | +0.36 |
| Alliance | | | | | 24 | 0.09 | −0.04 |
| Libertarianz | | | | | 22 | 0.08 | +0.01 |
| Democrats | | | | | 9 | 0.03 | −0.02 |
| Informal votes | | 532 | | | 237 | | |
| Total valid votes | | 27,089 | | | 28,024 | | |
| National gain from Labour | Majority | 47 | 0.17 | +3.08 | | | |

Electorate (as at 26 November 2011): 39,419

=== 2008 election ===
2008 general election: Christchurch Central
| Notes: | Blue background denotes the winner of the electorate vote. Pink background denotes a candidate elected from their party list. Yellow background denotes an electorate win by a list member, or other incumbent. A ✓ or ✗ denotes status of any incumbent, win or lose respectively. | | | | | | |
| Party | Candidate | Votes | % | ±% | Party votes | % | ±% |
|---|---|---|---|---|---|---|---|
| Labour | Brendon Burns | 14,078 | 43.83 | −8.74 | 12,999 | 39.36 | −8.95 |
| National | Nicky Wagner | 13,143 | 40.92 | +11.65 | 12,409 | 37.58 | +7.07 |
| Green | Jan McLauchlan | 2,708 | 8.43 | +1.78 | 3,688 | 11.17 | +1.47 |
| Progressive | Somnath Bagchi | 598 | 1.86 | −1.34 | 697 | 2.11 | +0.25 |
| Legalise Cannabis | Michael Britnell | 487 | 1.52 | – | 187 | 0.57 | +0.20 |
| ACT | Toni Severin | 482 | 1.50 | +0.49 | 897 | 2.72 | +1.66 |
| Kiwi | Andrew Beaven | 353 | 1.10 | – | 218 | 0.66 | – |
| Workers Party | Byron Clark (Note: Byron Clark contested the seat in the 2005 election for the same party, which was then called the Anti-Capitalist Alliance.) | 164 | 0.51 | +0.24 | 33 | 0.10 | |
| Alliance | Greg Kleis | 103 | 0.32 | – | 41 | 0.12 | +0.01 |
| NZ First | | | | | 1,036 | 3.14 | −0.90 |
| United Future | | | | | 239 | 0.72 | −2.32 |
| Māori Party | | | | | 230 | 0.70 | 0.36 |
| Bill and Ben | | | | | 187 | 0.57 | – |
| Family Party | | | | | 87 | 0.26 | – |
| Pacific | | | | | 31 | 0.09 | – |
| Libertarianz | | | | | 21 | 0.06 | +0.04 |
| Democrats | | | | | 16 | 0.05 | +0.00 |
| RONZ | | | | | 5 | 0.02 | +0.00 |
| RAM | | | | | 2 | 0.01 | – |
| Informal votes | | 306 | | | 119 | | |
| Total valid votes | | 32,116 | | | 33,023 | | |
| Labour hold | Majority | 935 | 2.91 | −20.38 | | | |

=== 2005 election ===
2005 general election: Christchurch Central
| Notes: | Blue background denotes the winner of the electorate vote. Pink background denotes a candidate elected from their party list. Yellow background denotes an electorate win by a list member, or other incumbent. A ✓ or ✗ denotes status of any incumbent, win or lose respectively. | | | | | | |
| Party | Candidate | Votes | % | ±% | Party votes | % | ±% |
|---|---|---|---|---|---|---|---|
| Labour | ✓ Tim Barnett | 17,685 | 52.57 | | 16,652 | 48.31 | |
| National | Nicky Wagner | 9,849 | 29.28 | | 10,515 | 30.51 | |
| Green | Natalie Cutler-Welsh | 2,236 | 6.65 | | 3,342 | 9.70 | |
| Progressive | Megan Woods | 1,077 | 3.20 | | 643 | 1.87 | |
| NZ First | Kevin Gardener | 1,022 | 3.04 | | 1,391 | 4.04 | |
| United Future | John van Buren | 761 | 2.26 | | 1,048 | 3.04 | |
| ACT | Shirley Marshall | 340 | 1.01 | | 364 | 1.06 | |
| Destiny | Anita Breach | 338 | 1.01 | | 144 | 0.42 | |
| Māori Party | Darryl Gregory | 188 | 0.56 | | 116 | 0.34 | |
| Anti-Capitalist Alliance | Byron Clark | 90 | 0.27 | | | | |
| Communist League | Annalucia Vermunt | 53 | 0.16 | | | | |
| Legalise Cannabis | | | | | 125 | 0.36 | |
| Alliance | | | | | 40 | 0.12 | |
| Christian Heritage | | | | | 37 | 0.11 | |
| Democrats | | | | | 15 | 0.04 | |
| 99 MP | | | | | 10 | 0.03 | |
| Libertarianz | | | | | 9 | 0.03 | |
| Direct Democracy | | | | | 7 | 0.02 | |
| RONZ | | | | | 5 | 0.01 | |
| Family Rights | | | | | 4 | 0.01 | |
| One NZ | | | | | 2 | 0.01 | |
| Informal votes | | 410 | | | 193 | | |
| Total valid votes | | 33,639 | | | 34,469 | | |
| Labour hold | Majority | 7,836 | | | | | |

=== 2002 election ===
2002 general election: Christchurch Central
| Notes: | Blue background denotes the winner of the electorate vote. Pink background denotes a candidate elected from their party list. Yellow background denotes an electorate win by a list member, or other incumbent. A ✓ or ✗ denotes status of any incumbent, win or lose respectively. | | | | | | |
| Party | Candidate | Votes | % | ±% | Party votes | % | ±% |
|---|---|---|---|---|---|---|---|
| Labour | ✓ Tim Barnett | 17,190 | 56.2 | | 13,853 | 43.4 | |
| National | Nicky Wagner | 6,837 | 22.4 | | 5,338 | 17.0 | |
| Green | Matt Morris | 1,791 | 5.9 | | 3,479 | 11.1 | |
| United Future | Stephen Russell | 1,160 | 3.8 | | 2,118 | 6.8 | |
| Christian Heritage | Vic Pollard | 874 | 2.9 | | 430 | 1.4 | |
| ACT | Anthony Watson | 762 | 2.5 | | 1,845 | 5.9 | |
| Progressive | Fleur Churton | 761 | 2.5 | | 930 | 3.0 | |
| Alliance | Liz Gordon | 635 | 2.1 | | 598 | 1.9 | |
| Legalise Cannabis | Jeanette Saxby | 469 | 1.5 | | 327 | 1.0 | |
| Communist League | Appu Baskaran | 99 | 0.3 | | | | |
| NZ First | | | | | 2,106 | 6.7 | |
| ORNZ | | | | | 280 | 0.9 | |
| One NZ | | | | | 16 | 0.1 | |
| Mana Māori | | | | | 10 | <0.1 | |
| NMP | | | | | 3 | (0.1 | |
| Informal votes | | 516 | | | 135 | | |
| Total valid votes | | 30,578 | | | 31,333 | | |
| Labour hold | Majority | 10,353 | | | | | |

=== 1999 election ===
1999 general election: Christchurch Central
| Notes: | Blue background denotes the winner of the electorate vote. Pink background denotes a candidate elected from their party list. Yellow background denotes an electorate win by a list member, or other incumbent. A ✓ or ✗ denotes status of any incumbent, win or lose respectively. | | | | | | |
| Party | Candidate | Votes | % | ±% | Party votes | % | ±% |
|---|---|---|---|---|---|---|---|
| Labour | ✓ Tim Barnett | 17,229 | 52.80 | | 13,407 | | |
| National | John Stringer | 7,825 | 23.98 | | 8,887 | | |
| Alliance | Liz Gordon | 2,690 | 8.24 | | 3,369 | | |
| Green | Diana Pennell | 1,658 | 5.08 | | 2,421 | | |
| ACT | Katherine Sillars | 951 | 2.91 | | 1,731 | | |
| Christian Heritage | John Bryant | 689 | 2.11 | | 695 | | |
| NZ First | John Ballantyne | 641 | 1.96 | | 880 | | |
| Christian Democrats | Daryl Gregory | 481 | 1.47 | | 423 | | |
| McGillicuddy Serious | Cecil G. Murgatroyd | 232 | 0.71 | | 56 | | |
| Independent | David Ball | 132 | 0.40 | | | | |
| Communist League | Ruth Gray | 51 | 0.16 | | | | |
| National Democrats | Anton Foljambe | 44 | 0.13 | | | | |
| Dominion Workers | Clifford Mundy | 9 | 0.03 | | | | |
| Legalise Cannabis | | | | | 584 | | |
| United NZ | | | | | 154 | | |
| Libertarianz | | | | | 132 | | |
| South Island | | | | | 69 | | |
| Animals First | | | | | 58 | | |
| Natural Law | | | | | 17 | | |
| Mauri Pacific | | | | | 7 | | |
| One NZ | | | | | 7 | | |
| Republican | | | | | 7 | | |
| Mana Māori | | | | | 6 | | |
| NMP | | | | | 4 | | |
| Freedom Movement | | | | | 2 | | |
| People's Choice Party | | | | | 2 | | |
| Informal votes | | | | | 267 | | |
| Total valid votes | | | | | 32,918 | | |
| Labour hold | Majority | 9,404 | | | | | |

=== 1996 election ===
1996 general election: Christchurch Central
| Notes: | Blue background denotes the winner of the electorate vote. Pink background denotes a candidate elected from their party list. Yellow background denotes an electorate win by a list member, or other incumbent. A ✓ or ✗ denotes status of any incumbent, win or lose respectively. | | | | | | |
| Party | Candidate | Votes | % | ±% | Party votes | % | ±% |
|---|---|---|---|---|---|---|---|
| Labour | Tim Barnett | 9,689 | 32.28 | | 9,967 | 32.79 | |
| National | Kerry Sullivan | 9,036 | 30.10 | | 9,355 | 30.77 | |
| Alliance | Liz Gordon | 6,377 | 21.25 | | 4,372 | 14.38 | |
| NZ First | Ron Mark | 3,067 | 10.22 | | 2,434 | 8.01 | |
| ACT | Matthew Ball | 953 | 3.18 | | 1,517 | 4.99 | |
| Progressive Greens | Gillian Baillie | 386 | 1.29 | | 106 | 0.35 | |
| United NZ | Jacinta Grice | 224 | 0.75 | | 226 | 0.74 | |
| Natural Law | Raymond Cain | 112 | 0.37 | | 66 | 0.22 | |
| Independent | David Christopher Ball | 102 | 0.34 | | | | |
| Communist League | Patrick Brown | 69 | 0.23 | | | | |
| Christian Coalition | | | | | 1,162 | 3.82 | |
| Legalise Cannabis | | | | | 931 | 3.06 | |
| McGillicuddy Serious | | | | | 102 | 0.34 | |
| Animals First | | | | | 85 | 0.28 | |
| Green Society | | | | | 19 | 0.06 | |
| Superannuitants & Youth | | | | | 16 | 0.05 | |
| Mana Māori | | | | | 11 | 0.04 | |
| Ethnic Minority Party | | | | | 10 | 0.03 | |
| Conservatives | | | | | 8 | 0.03 | |
| Libertarianz | | | | | 7 | 0.02 | |
| Advance New Zealand | | | | | 3 | 0.01 | |
| Asia Pacific United | | | | | 1 | 0.00 | |
| Te Tawharau | | | | | 1 | 0.00 | |
| Informal votes | | 476 | | | 92 | | |
| Total valid votes | | 30,015 | | | 30,399 | | |
| Labour hold | Majority | 653 | 2.18 | | | | |

=== 1993 election ===
1993 general election: Christchurch Central
| Party | Candidate | Votes | % | ±% |
|---|---|---|---|---|
| Labour | Lianne Dalziel | 9,841 | 55.21 | +6.69 |
| National | Andrew Rowe | 3,652 | 20.49 | |
| Alliance | Michael Vercoe | 3,501 | 19.64 | |
| Christian Heritage | Tony Le Cren | 413 | 2.32 | +0.06 |
| McGillicuddy Serious | Kieran Kelly | 240 | 1.35 | |
| Natural Law | Glenda Martin | 126 | 0.71 | |
| Communist League | Carmen Bain | 52 | 0.29 | |
| Majority | | 6,189 | 34.72 | |
| Informal votes | | 764 | 4.11 | |
| Turnout | | 18,589 | 82.61 | +3.70 |
| Registered electors | | 22,502 | | |

=== 1990 election ===
1990 general election: Christchurch Central
| Party | Candidate | Votes | % | ±% |
|---|---|---|---|---|
| Labour | Lianne Dalziel | 8,487 | 48.52 | |
| National | Ross Gluer | 4,718 | 26.97 | |
| NewLabour | Sidonie Bradbury-Moore | 1,963 | 11.22 | |
| Green | Ruth Gardner | 1,541 | 8.81 | |
| Christian Heritage | Tony Le Cren | 396 | 2.26 | |
| Democrats | Joe Pounsford | 164 | 0.93 | −2.27 |
| McGillicuddy Serious | Shane Murphy | 101 | 0.57 | |
| Social Credit | Neville Minchington | 94 | 0.53 | |
| Communist League | Brigid Rotheram | 27 | 0.15 | |
| Majority | | 3,769 | 21.54 | |
| Turnout | | 17,491 | 78.91 | −3.33 |
| Registered electors | | 22,163 | | |

=== 1987 election ===
1987 general election: Christchurch Central
| Party | Candidate | Votes | % | ±% |
|---|---|---|---|---|
| Labour | Geoffrey Palmer | 11,836 | 65.28 | +1.92 |
| National | Graham Burnett | 5,031 | 27.75 | |
| Democrats | Joe Pounsford | 557 | 3.07 | +0.06 |
| Breakfast Party | James Daniels | 235 | 1.29 | |
| Socialist Action | Felicity Brereton | 196 | 1.08 | |
| Wizard Party | David Hanlon | 119 | 0.65 | |
| Values | Stephen Symons | 85 | 0.46 | |
| NZ Party | Lynn Yeoman | 70 | 0.38 | |
| Majority | | 6,805 | 37.53 | −2.72 |
| Turnout | | 18,129 | 82.24 | −7.32 |
| Registered electors | | 22,043 | | |

=== 1984 election ===
1984 general election: Christchurch Central
| Party | Candidate | Votes | % | ±% |
|---|---|---|---|---|
| Labour | Geoffrey Palmer | 13,394 | 63.36 | +0.11 |
| National | Tony Willy | 4,886 | 23.11 | |
| NZ Party | Murray Ludemann | 2,072 | 9.80 | |
| Social Credit | Joe Pounsford | 662 | 3.13 | |
| Independent | Suzanne Sadler | 123 | 0.58 | |
| Majority | | 8,508 | 40.25 | −0.94 |
| Turnout | | 21,137 | 89.56 | +4.46 |
| Registered electors | | 23,599 | | |

=== 1981 election ===
1981 general election: Christchurch Central
| Party | Candidate | Votes | % | ±% |
|---|---|---|---|---|
| Labour | Geoffrey Palmer | 10,793 | 63.25 | −0.95 |
| National | Ian Wilson | 3,765 | 22.06 | |
| Social Credit | Peter Admore | 2,426 | 14.21 | |
| Independent | Warwick Iversen | 78 | 0.45 | |
| Majority | | 7,028 | 41.19 | −4.64 |
| Turnout | | 17,062 | 85.10 | +49.10 |
| Registered electors | | 20,048 | | |

=== 1979 by-election ===
1979 Christchurch Central by-election
| Party | Candidate | Votes | % | ±% |
|---|---|---|---|---|
| Labour | Geoffrey Palmer | 6,149 | 64.20 | +3.03 |
| Social Credit | Terry Heffernan | 1,759 | 18.37 | +9.02 |
| National | David Duncan | 1,634 | 17.06 | −8.55 |
| Tory | Suzanne Sadler | 26 | 0.27 | |
| Economic Euthenics | Tubby Hansen | 10 | 0.10 | |
| Informal votes | | 397 | 3.98 | |
| Majority | | 4,390 | 45.83 | +10.27 |
| Turnout | | 9,578 | 36.00 | |
| Registered electors | | 26,605 | | |
| Labour hold | | Swing | +11.58 | |

=== 1978 election ===
1978 general election: Christchurch Central
| Party | Candidate | Votes | % | ±% |
|---|---|---|---|---|
| Labour | Bruce Barclay | 10,229 | 61.17 | +8.21 |
| National | Gwen Clucas | 4,282 | 25.60 | |
| Social Credit | Robert Gyde | 1,564 | 9.35 | |
| Values | Robin Duff | 616 | 3.68 | |
| Socialist Action | Michael William Gourley | 30 | 0.17 | |
| Majority | | 5,947 | 35.56 | +17.32 |
| Turnout | | 16,721 | 52.32 | −18.19 |
| Registered electors | | 31,956 | | |

=== 1975 election ===
1975 general election: Christchurch Central
| Party | Candidate | Votes | % | ±% |
|---|---|---|---|---|
| Labour | Bruce Barclay | 8,630 | 52.96 | −7.96 |
| National | Tim Armitage | 5,657 | 34.71 | |
| Values | Robin Duff | 1,415 | 8.68 | |
| Social Credit | Alan Easterbrook | 555 | 3.40 | |
| Imperial British Conservative | Coronita Wealleans | 37 | 0.22 | |
| Majority | | 2,973 | 18.24 | −12.94 |
| Turnout | | 16,294 | 70.51 | −14.49 |
| Registered electors | | 23,107 | | |

=== 1972 election ===
1972 general election: Christchurch Central
| Party | Candidate | Votes | % | ±% |
|---|---|---|---|---|
| Labour | Bruce Barclay | 9,971 | 60.92 | +2.87 |
| National | Barbara Beaven | 4,868 | 29.74 | |
| Social Credit | Ray Thomas | 700 | 4.27 | |
| Values | Diane Roberts | 693 | 4.23 | |
| Socialist Unity | Arnold James Cox | 68 | 0.41 | |
| New Democratic | Cairn George Jensen | 66 | 0.40 | |
| Majority | | 5,103 | 31.18 | +8.72 |
| Turnout | | 16,366 | 85.00 | −1.61 |
| Registered electors | | 19,252 | | |

=== 1969 election ===
1969 general election: Christchurch Central
| Party | Candidate | Votes | % | ±% |
|---|---|---|---|---|
| Labour | Bruce Barclay | 8,801 | 58.05 | |
| National | Colin Knight | 5,395 | 35.58 | |
| Social Credit | Stan Fitchett | 964 | 6.35 | |
| Majority | | 3,406 | 22.46 | |
| Turnout | | 15,160 | 86.61 | +6.79 |
| Registered electors | | 17,502 | | |

=== 1966 election ===
1966 general election: Christchurch Central
| Party | Candidate | Votes | % | ±% |
|---|---|---|---|---|
| Labour | Robert Macfarlane | 6,771 | 49.32 | −2.92 |
| National | Fred Francis | 5,362 | 39.06 | |
| Social Credit | Lola Thompson | 1,455 | 10.60 | +3.11 |
| Communist | Jack Locke | 138 | 1.00 | −0.26 |
| Majority | | 1,409 | 10.26 | −2.98 |
| Turnout | | 13,726 | 79.82 | −4.10 |
| Registered electors | | 17,196 | | |

=== 1963 election ===
1963 general election: Christchurch Central
| Party | Candidate | Votes | % | ±% |
|---|---|---|---|---|
| Labour | Robert Macfarlane | 7,552 | 52.24 | −1.52 |
| National | Dave Patchett | 5,637 | 38.99 | |
| Social Credit | Lola Thompson | 1,084 | 7.49 | |
| Communist | Jack Locke | 183 | 1.26 | +0.21 |
| Majority | | 1,915 | 13.24 | −2.09 |
| Turnout | | 14,456 | 83.92 | −0.69 |
| Registered electors | | 17,225 | | |

=== 1960 election ===
1960 general election: Christchurch Central
| Party | Candidate | Votes | % | ±% |
|---|---|---|---|---|
| Labour | Robert Macfarlane | 6,786 | 53.76 | −7.01 |
| National | Tom Flint | 4,851 | 38.43 | |
| Social Credit | Walter Green | 851 | 6.74 | |
| Communist | Jack Locke | 133 | 1.05 | −0.01 |
| Majority | | 1,935 | 15.33 | −12.90 |
| Turnout | | 12,621 | 84.61 | −4.62 |
| Registered electors | | 14,916 | | |

=== 1957 election ===
1957 general election: Christchurch Central
| Party | Candidate | Votes | % | ±% |
|---|---|---|---|---|
| Labour | Robert Macfarlane | 8,763 | 60.77 | +6.84 |
| National | Colin McLachlan | 4,692 | 32.54 | |
| Social Credit | William John Campbell | 811 | 5.62 | |
| Communist | Jack Locke | 153 | 1.06 | |
| Majority | | 4,071 | 28.23 | +3.30 |
| Turnout | | 14,419 | 89.23 | +3.15 |
| Registered electors | | 16,158 | | |

=== 1954 election ===
1954 general election: Christchurch Central
| Party | Candidate | Votes | % | ±% |
|---|---|---|---|---|
| Labour | Robert Macfarlane | 7,345 | 53.93 | −8.79 |
| National | Oliver G. Moody | 3,950 | 29.00 | |
| Social Credit | Albert E. Willyams | 2,185 | 16.04 | |
| Communist | Alec Ostler | 137 | 1.00 | |
| Majority | | 3,395 | 24.93 | −0.89 |
| Turnout | | 13,617 | 86.08 | +3.61 |
| Registered electors | | 15,819 | | |

=== 1951 election ===
1951 general election: Christchurch Central
| Party | Candidate | Votes | % | ±% |
|---|---|---|---|---|
| Labour | Robert Macfarlane | 6,901 | 62.72 | −1.81 |
| National | Alma Schumacher | 4,103 | 37.28 | |
| Majority | | 2,798 | 25.42 | −5.50 |
| Turnout | | 11,004 | 82.47 | −6.90 |
| Registered electors | | 13,343 | | |

=== 1949 election ===
1949 general election: Christchurch Central
| Party | Candidate | Votes | % | ±% |
|---|---|---|---|---|
| Labour | Robert Macfarlane | 7,589 | 64.53 | −1.96 |
| National | Kevin Marlow | 3,952 | 33.60 | |
| Communist | Alec Ostler | 218 | 1.85 | −0.56 |
| Majority | | 3,637 | 30.92 | −4.49 |
| Turnout | | 11,759 | 89.37 | +0.40 |
| Registered electors | | 13,157 | | |

=== 1946 election ===
1946 general election: Christchurch Central
| Party | Candidate | Votes | % | ±% |
|---|---|---|---|---|
| Labour | Robert Macfarlane | 8,300 | 66.49 | |
| National | Alan J. Wills | 3,880 | 31.08 | |
| Communist | Alec Ostler | 302 | 2.41 | |
| Majority | | 4,420 | 35.41 | |
| Turnout | | 12,482 | 88.97 | |
| Registered electors | | 14,028 | | |
