= Matthew Palmer =

New Zealand academic

The Honourable Matthew Palmer KC
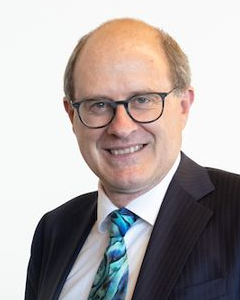
- Palmer in 2022

Judge of the Court of Appeal of New Zealand
- Incumbent
- Assumed office 1 June 2024

Judge of the High Court of New Zealand
- In office 16 October 2015 – 31 May 2024

Personal details
- Born: 12 May 1964 (age 62)
- Parent(s): Geoffrey Palmer; Margaret Hinchcliff
- Education: University of Canterbury, BA; Victoria University of Wellington, LLB(Hons); Yale Law School, LLM & JSD

Matthew Simon Russell Palmer KC (born 12 May 1964) is a New Zealand judge, legal academic and former public servant.

Palmer graduated with a BA in Economics & Political Science from University of Canterbury in 1983. This was followed by a LLB (Hons) (First Class) in 1987, and then an LLM & JSD from Yale Law School in 1993.

Palmer was the Pro Vice-Chancellor (Government Relations), Dean of Law, and Director of the New Zealand Centre for Public Law at Victoria University of Wellington from January 2001 until June 2007. He has also held positions in the Treasury and has been Deputy Secretary of Justice (Public Law) in the New Zealand Ministry of Justice and Deputy Solicitor-General (Public Law) in the New Zealand Crown Law Office.

He is son of former Prime Minister Sir Geoffrey Palmer, who was also a professor of law at Victoria University for many years.

Matthew Palmer is author of The Treaty of Waitangi in New Zealand's Law and Constitution, which was published in November 2008. He also co-authored (with his father) Bridled Power, a leading text on New Zealand public law.

On 16 October 2015, Palmer was appointed a Judge of the High Court of New Zealand. This was followed by his appointment to the Court of Appeal on 1 June 2024. As of 2024, he is the chair of the Institute of Judicial Studies.
