= Robin Duff =

New Zealand education leader and gay rights activist

Robin Duff (1947 – 16 February 2015) was a New Zealand teacher, education leader and gay rights activist. He was the first openly gay secondary school teacher and parliamentary candidate in New Zealand.

== Biography ==
Born and raised in Hastings, Duff was educated at Hastings Boys' High School. He then studied at the University of Canterbury in Christchurch, and became a secondary school teacher. He began teaching at Burnside High School in 1973 and was New Zealand's first openly gay secondary school teacher. His pupils included future prime minister John Key and media commentator Russell Brown.

While at university, Duff became involved in gay activism, forming the University of Canterbury Gay Activists Society with Lindsay Taylor, and helping to launch Gay Liberation Christchurch, both in 1972. He also joined the Values Party and stood unsuccessfully as a candidate for Christchurch Central at the 1975 and 1978 general elections, becoming the first openly gay parliamentary candidate in New Zealand.

Duff was also active in the Post Primary Teachers' Association, serving as its junior vice-president between 2005 and 2007, president from 2007 to 2009 and 2011 to 2013, and senior vice-president between 2009 and 2011 and from 2013 until his death in Christchurch in 2015.
