= Kahurangi Carter =

New Zealand politician (born 1983 or 1984)

Kahurangi Carter MP
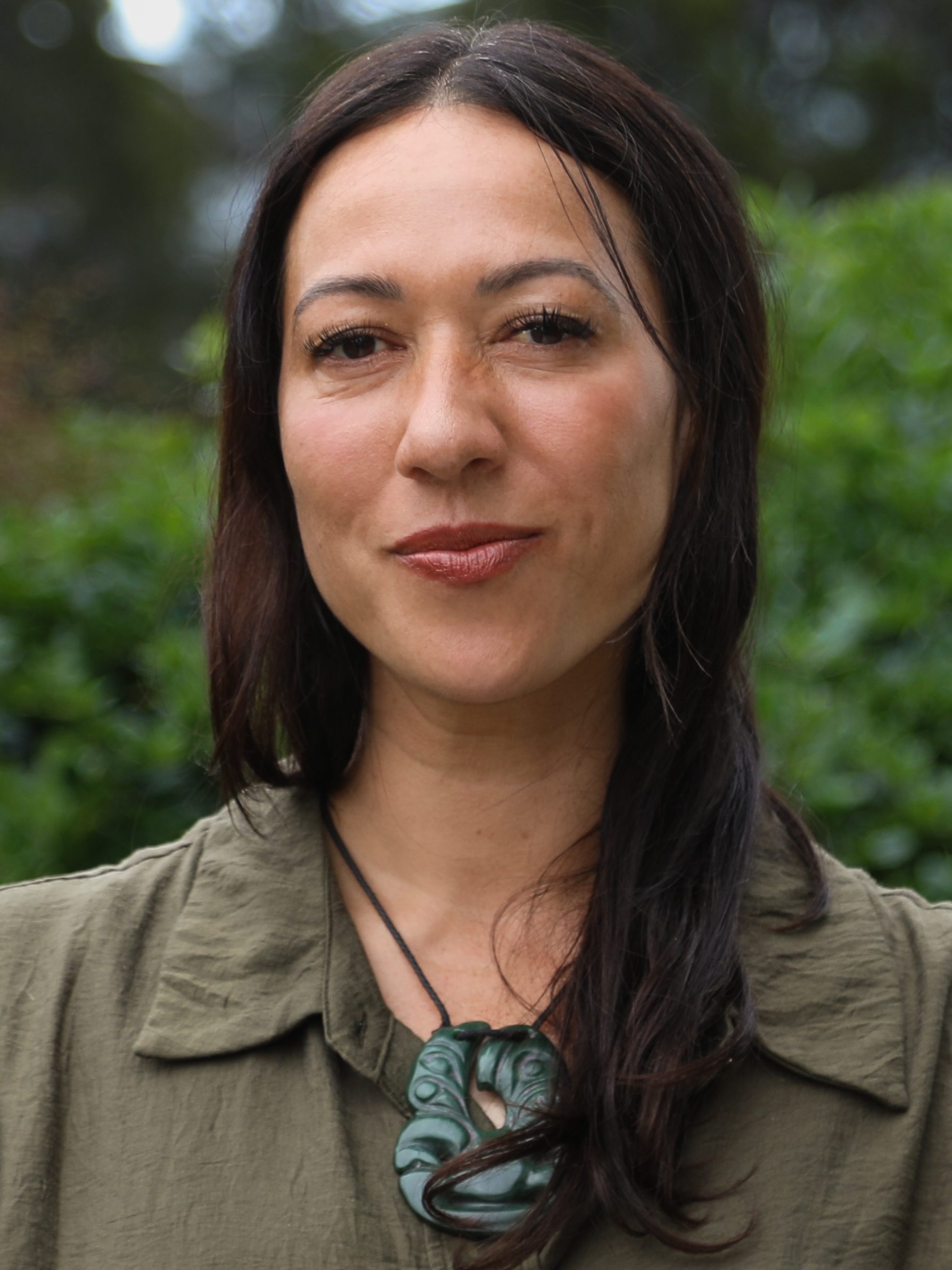
- Carter in 2026

Member of the New Zealand Parliament for Green party list
- Incumbent
- Assumed office 14 October 2023

Personal details
- Born: 1983 or 1984 (age 42–43)
- Party: Green
- Carter's voice Recorded 28 July 2024

Kahurangi Carter MP (born 1983 or 1984) is a New Zealand politician. She has served as a list Member of Parliament for the Green Party of Aotearoa New Zealand since 2023.

== Early life ==
Carter was born in 1983 or 1984 and is of Ngāti Maniapoto and Tainui descent. She was born and lived in rural Waikato until she was twelve, when her family moved to Auckland's North Shore. She has a Bachelor of Arts from the University of Auckland. Carter is a zero-waste advocate, and she worked for the Ministry for the Environment for three years. She studied the Meisner Technique for a brief period at the Neighborhood Playhouse School of Theatre in New York in 2013. She also appeared in a controversial promotional video as part of the Telecom "Gigatown" competition. Carter moved to Christchurch in 2021.

== Political career ==
New Zealand Parliament
Years	Term	Electorate	List	Party
2023–2026	54th	List	14	Green
2026–present	55th	List	11	Green

=== 2023 general election ===
Carter was encouraged to enter politics by Chlöe Swarbrick. She has also said that she was inspired by her son's concerns about climate change and property ownership. In the 2023 general election, Carter stood in the Christchurch Central electorate but lost to Labour's Duncan Webb. She entered Parliament as the 14th-placed list MP for the Green Party. The final results on 3 November confirmed her election to Parliament on the party list.

=== First term, 2023–2026 ===
In late November 2023, Carter assumed the Green Party's Zero Waste, Children, Disability Issues, Rainbow Communities, Community and Voluntary Sector, Arts, Culture and Heritage, Christchurch Issues spokesperson portfolios. She also became the party's Deputy Musterer.

In November 2024, Carter became the sponsor of the Green Party's Copyright (Parody and Satire) Amendment Bill, which proposed allowing copyrighted works to be used for parody, satire and memes. On 8 November 2024, the bill was pulled from Parliament's ballot. Carter said that the bill would "protect artists' right to freedom of speech, and in doing so helps protect our democracy."

In September 2025, Carter had a second member bill drawn from the biscuit tin. The bill would establish a Good Samaritan law such that people calling emergency services would not be prosecuted for related low-level drug offences. The New Zealand Drug Foundation supported the law change as it could help to reduce the rate of fatal overdoses in New Zealand.

In January 2026, Carter announced that she would be contesting the Christchurch Central electorate at the 2026 general election, after incumbent Duncan Webb announced his retirement.

In late July 2026, Carter introduced a member's bill called the Waste Minimisation (Food Waste) Amendment Bill, which would require supermarkets to donate surplus food to charities in order to minimise food waste. Her bill was modelled after French legislation requiring supermarkets to reduce food waste and donate suitable surplus food to charities.

=== Second term, 2026–present ===
During the 2026 New Zealand general election, Carter was ranked 11th on the Green Party list. She contested the Christchurch Central electorate. On 7 November, Carter came third place in the Christchurch Central race, with 6,165 votes based on preliminary results. She was re-elected to Parliament on the Green Party list.

== Views and positions ==
Issues Carter sees as important for Christchurch include protections for people in rental housing, wage increases, affordable city living, public transport, and waste minimisation.

== Personal life ==
Carter's hobbies include swimming and dancing. She has two children and has talked about her bisexuality.
