= George Hampton =

George Hampton may refer to:

- George Hampton (cricketer), New Zealand representative cricketer from Auckland
- George Hampton (politician), New Zealand member of parliament
- George Hampton (public servant) (c. 1838 – 1876), public official in colonial Western Australia
