= George Hampton (politician) =

New Zealand politician and Fulbright scholar

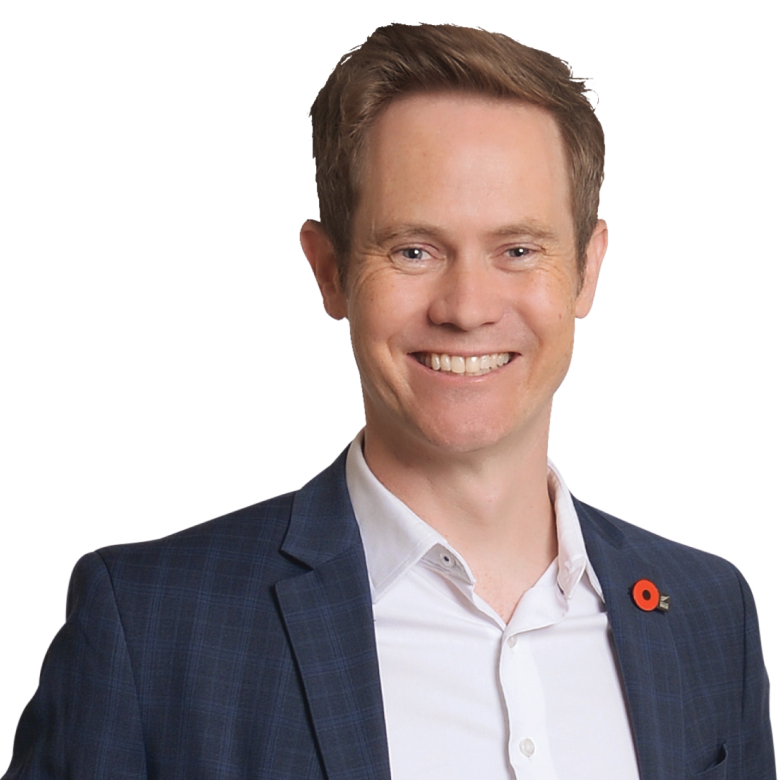

Member of the New Zealand Parliament for Christchurch Central
- Incumbent
- Assumed office 2026

Personal details
- Party: Labour
- Relations: Winnie Laban (aunt)
- Children: 1
- Profession: Diplomat

George Hampton is a New Zealand politician and Member of Parliament in the House of Representatives for the Labour Party.

== Early life and career ==
In his youth Hampton spent summers as a student selling raspberries from his car boot. He attended Canterbury University. Hampton worked for Prime Minister Helen Clark as a political advisor in the lead-up to the 2008 election, taking over the role from Chris Hipkins, who had left to be a candidate.

Hampton then left New Zealand in 2011, studying at both Harvard and Columbia universities and a Fulbright scholar. He worked as a diplomat and was New Zealand's deputy ambassador to the United Nations in Vienna until 2014. He was New Zealand's peace and security expert to the United Nations Security Council when New Zealand was chair. Hampton was New Zealand's peace and security expert to the United Nations Security Council when New Zealand was the chair. He then worked on Helen Clark's 2016 bid to become United Nations Secretary-General. In 2018 he began working for the United Nations on global renewable energy projects and policy. Upon returning to New Zealand he became a part-owner of the ice-cream franchise Mr. Whippy.

== Political career ==
New Zealand Parliament
Years	Term	Electorate	List	Party
2026–present	55th	Christchurch Central		Labour

He was selected unopposed as the Labour Party candidate for the North Shore electorate at the 2023 election. He was ranked 41 on the Labour party list. He did not win the seat and was too low to be allocated a list seat.

In 2026 he was selected as Labour's candidate for the Christchurch Central electorate at the 2026 election. On 7 November, Hampton won Christchurch Central race by a margin of 2,632 votes, based on preliminary results.

== Personal life and family ==
Together with his partner he has one daughter. Hampton's aunt Luamanuvao Dame Winnie Laban was an MP from 1999 to 2010. His father, Nigel Hampton, is a King's Counsel lawyer who represented the families after the Pike River Mine disaster.
