= Mr. Whippy New Zealand =

New Zealand ice cream vendor

- Type: Company and franchise
- Industry: Food; Retail; Direct service
- Products: Frozen yogurt; Soft serves; Beverages
- Parent: Tatua
- Website: mrwhippy.co.nz

Mr. Whippy New Zealand is a franchise of ice-cream vendors operating in New Zealand.

== History ==
The original Mr. Whippy in the United Kingdom franchised internationally to New Zealand, sending 24 vans over in the 1960s.

As of present day, in New Zealand, there are around 36 Mr.Whippy franchisees operating 58 vans. General Foods Limited (subsequently Tip Top) acquired the master rights for New Zealand in the early 1980s. The Isuzu Elf became the standard Mr Whippy van and an orange and white colour scheme replaced the original pink and white. In early 2000, Tip Top sold the master franchise to Peter Woodhams, the Waikato Mr Whippy franchisee, who in turn sold the master franchise to Flying Kiwi Holdings (a business owned and run by Nick Cairns, Scot and Geliana Graham) in 2006. The Mr Whippy vans became modernised, using Ford Transit and Fiat Ducato models, various Fuso variants and Tatua replaced Fonterra Brands NZ as the provider of the Mr Whippy UHT ice cream mix.

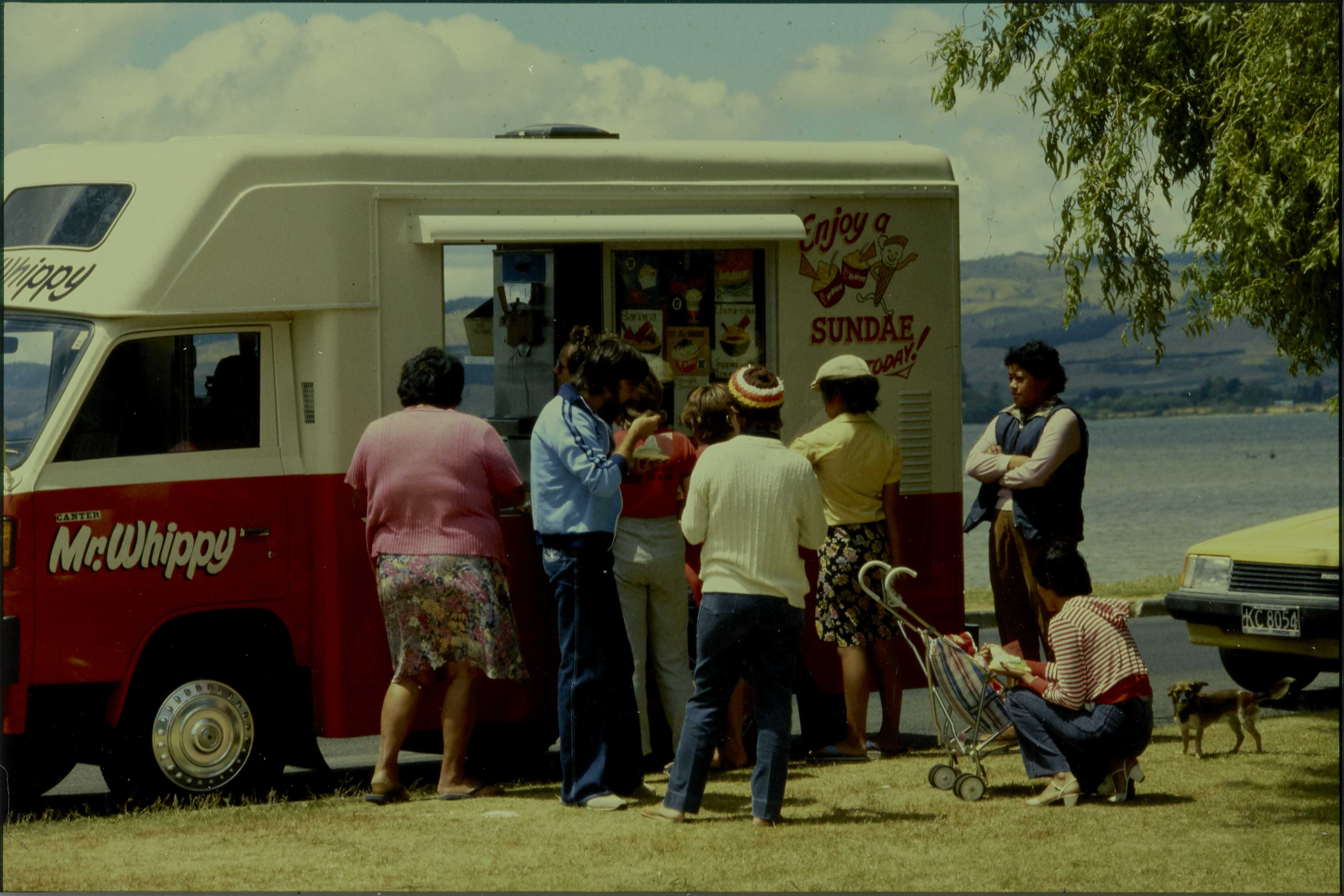
Mr Whippy van, Lake Rotorua (1983)
