= Terry Heffernan =

New Zealand politician

Terence Michael Heffernan (3 February 1952 – 13 March 2010) was a New Zealand politician who stood for Parliament on eight occasions. Heffernan was originally a member of the Social Credit Party before joining the New Zealand First Party and later, the New Zealand National Party.

== Early years ==
He was born in Oamaru and attended St Bede's College in Christchurch. He obtained a degree in history and economics at the University of Canterbury after starting an accounting degree. He taught at Christchurch Boys' High School and Xavier College, but with a passion for politics became a parliamentary researcher for Bruce Beetham and then Winston Peters. He admired 1930s Labour politicians Savage and Lee.

== Political activities ==
Originally a stalwart of the Social Credit Party, he represented them in the 1979 Christchurch Central by-election and came second; Labour's Geoffrey Palmer won the seat.

Heffernan stood in the Wanganui electorate in five general elections:

- in 1981 for the Social Credit Party
- in 1984 for the Social Credit Party
- in 1987 for the Democratic Party
- in 1990 for the Democratic Party
- in 1993 for New Zealand First

In 1987 he came second to Labour's Russell Marshall, who had an election-night majority of only 27 (though Marshall's final majority was 248).

In 1996 Heffernan stood for New Zealand First in Albany, against Murray McCully.

In the 2008 election, he stood as the National Party candidate for the Christchurch electorate of Port Hills, though already weakened by cancer.

== Death ==
Heffernan died in Christchurch on 13 March 2010, and his funeral was celebrated in St Joseph's Catholic Church in Papanui, Christchurch. A notice of motion in remembrance was lodged by Ruth Dyson in parliament on 18 March 2010.
