= 1979 Christchurch Central by-election =

New Zealand by-election

- 18 August 1979
- Turnout: 9,578 (36.00%)
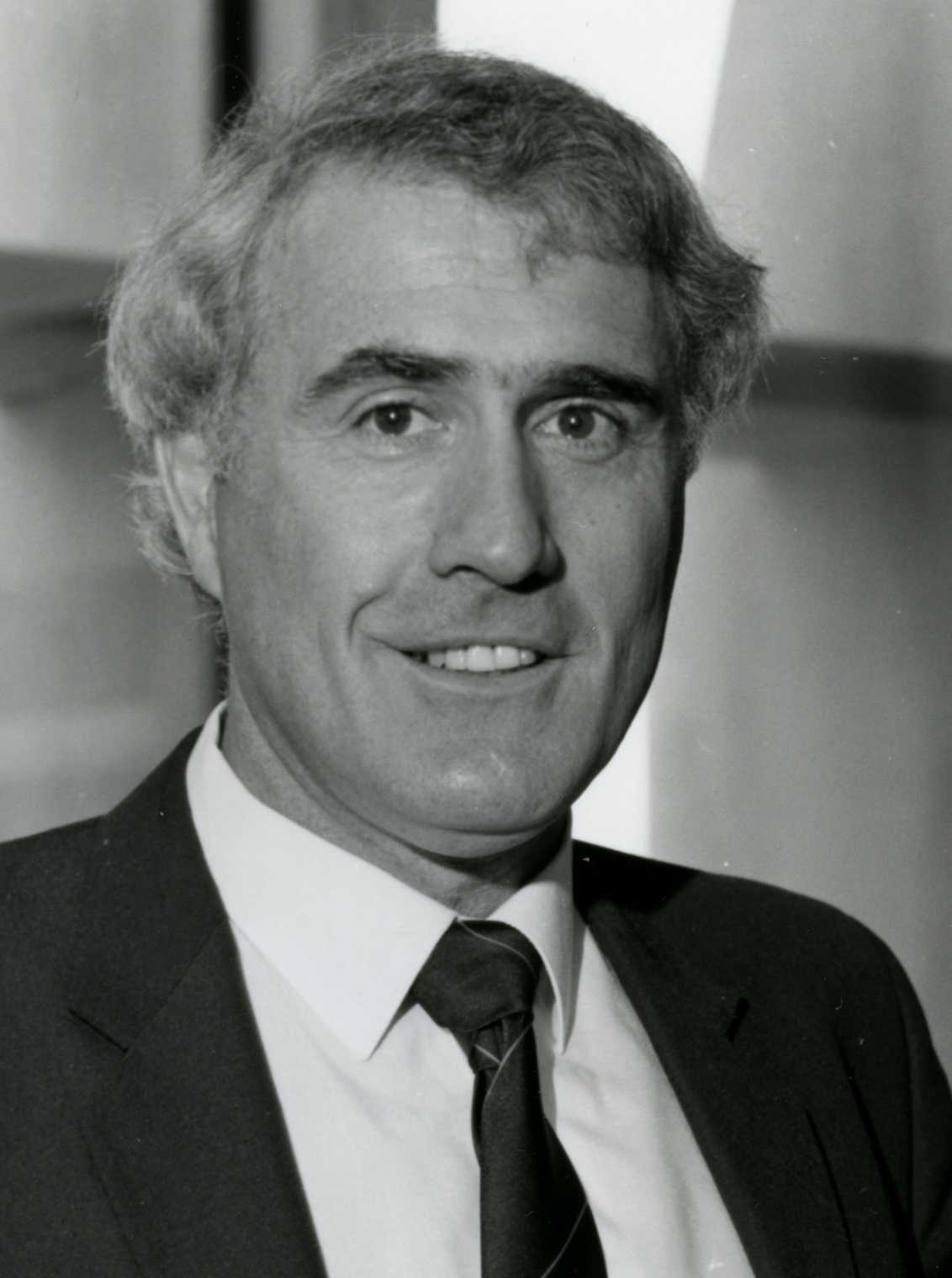

Candidate	Geoffrey Palmer	Terry Heffernan	David Duncan
Party	Labour	Social Credit	National
Popular vote	6,149	1,759	1,634
Percentage	64.20%	18.37%	17.06
Member before election
Bruce Barclay
Labour
Elected Member
Geoffrey Palmer
Labour

The Christchurch Central by-election of 1979 was a by-election during the 39th New Zealand Parliament. It was prompted by the death of Bruce Barclay, a Labour Party MP, and resulted in Geoffrey Palmer, also of the Labour Party, being elected to replace him for the seat of Christchurch Central. Palmer would eventually go on to become Prime Minister. The by-election was somewhat embarrassing for the National Party, whose candidate was pushed into third place by Social Credit's Terry Heffernan.

== Background ==
Bruce Barclay, the incumbent MP, died on 28 June 1979. He had been ill for some months prior to his death where it was reported he was suffering from cancer and had already had two surgical operations. His absence was noticed at Labour's first caucus meeting in February 1979 and Labour leader Bill Rowling stated he had visited Barclay earlier and expressed concern at his health after Barclay had become unable to perform his electorate duties earlier in the month.

== Candidates ==
=== Labour ===
As Christchurch Central was a safe Labour seat, there was a large amount of interest in the candidacy from the local Labour Party. There were 18 nominated candidates for the nomination. They were:

- Barry Brown, the South Island secretary of the Labourer's Union and member of the Labour Party Executive who was Labour's 1978 campaign manager in Lyttelton
- David Close, Christchurch City Councillor for Pegasus Ward and Labour's 1978 candidate for Fendalton
- Alan Falloon, a geologist who unsuccessfully sought the Labour nomination for Papanui in 1978
- Alister Graham, a member of the Christchurch Central electorate committee
- Cathy Hiniona, Christchurch organiser for the Housewives' Boycott Movement
- John Knowles, regional news editor for TV1 in Christchurch who unsuccessfully sought the Labour nomination for St Albans and Lyttelton in 1978
- Graham McCann, a Lyttelton Borough Councillor and chairman of the Lyttelton electorate committee
- Don McKenzie, an Ashburton Borough Councillor and Labour's 1978 candidate for Rangiora
- Charles Manning, a classics lecturer at University of Canterbury
- Clive Matthewson, an engineer and chairman of the Wanganui electorate committee who unsuccessfully sought the Labour nomination for Papanui in 1978
- Geoffrey Palmer, a professor of law at Victoria University who unsuccessfully sought the Labour nomination for Nelson in 1976
- David Penney, a vehicle inspector at the Ministry of Transport
- Neville Pickering, former MP for St Albans and Mayor of Christchurch who was Labour's 1978 candidate for Wellington Central
- Helene Ritchie, a psychologist and Wellington City Councillor who was Labour's 1978 candidate for Ohariu
- Don Rowlands, a teacher and Christchurch City Councillor for the North Ward
- JJ Stewart, former All Blacks coach and Labour's 1978 candidate for Tarawera
- Brian West, a farmer and chairman of the Waikato Labour Regional Council
- Trevor Young, a postal worker who was Labour's 1969 candidate for Invercargill

Despite the large field of candidates, there were three who emerged as frontrunners by the time nominations had closed; McCann, Matthewson and Palmer − and it was widely known that Palmer was Rowling's preferred choice. The selection meeting was held on 23 July at Linwood Intermediate School with over one hundred delegates present. A straw poll of members showed a majority of support for Palmer. The nominees were shortened to three; McCann, Matthewson and Palmer who were invited for interviews with the selection panel. Palmer was chosen and his success as the nominee was announced by party president Jim Anderton to the members present at 2:00 am.

=== National ===
National selected 29-year-old insurance consultant David Duncan. He was chairman of National's St Albans branch.

=== Social Credit ===
The Social Credit Party selected a high school teacher Terry Heffernan as their candidate. He had stood for the nearby seat of Sydenham in 1978. Heffernan had a high-profile endorsement from former Labour MP and party vice-president Gerald O'Brien, reaffirming his rift with Labour.

=== Others ===
- The Values Party decided not to contest the by-election. Values spokesperson Peter Heal said the party felt its future lay in being a pressure group rather than as a party and was applying its own conservation principles of not wasting resources by not standing a candidate. He said they would concentrate on applying pressure to the Labour Party to adopt Values policy.
- Suzanne Adelia Sadler campaigned under the name "Tinkerbell" for the Tory Party describing herself as a "slave" of the Canterbury Wizard. She had stood in Lyttelton in 1978.
- Perennial candidate Michael "Tubby" Hansen stood for the Economic Euthenics party. He described himself as a "gas chopper-offer" and had stood in several parliamentary and civic elections.

== Results ==
The following table gives the election results:

1979 Christchurch Central by-election
Party	Candidate	Votes	%	±%
Labour	Geoffrey Palmer	6,149	64.20	+3.03
Social Credit	Terry Heffernan	1,759	18.37	+9.02
National	David Duncan	1,634	17.06	−8.55
Tory	Suzanne Sadler	26	0.27	
Economic Euthenics	Tubby Hansen	10	0.10	
Informal votes		397	3.98	
Majority		4,390	45.83	+10.27
Turnout		9,578	36.00	
Registered electors		26,605		
Labour hold		Swing	+11.58	

Labour increased its vote slightly but the largest gains were made by the Social Credit Party, who came second in an urban seat for the first time in its history. National were pushed into third place who saw their vote shrink to the point where its candidate only just managed to avoid losing their deposit.

Based on a Supreme Court decision that altered the results for the Hunua electorate after the 1978 general election, stricter rules had to be applied for voters marking the voting papers correctly. Nearly 4% of the votes were deemed marked incorrectly.
