= Geoffrey Palmer (New Zealand politician) =

Prime Minister of New Zealand from 1989 to 1990

The Right Honourable Sir Geoffrey Palmer KCMG AC KC
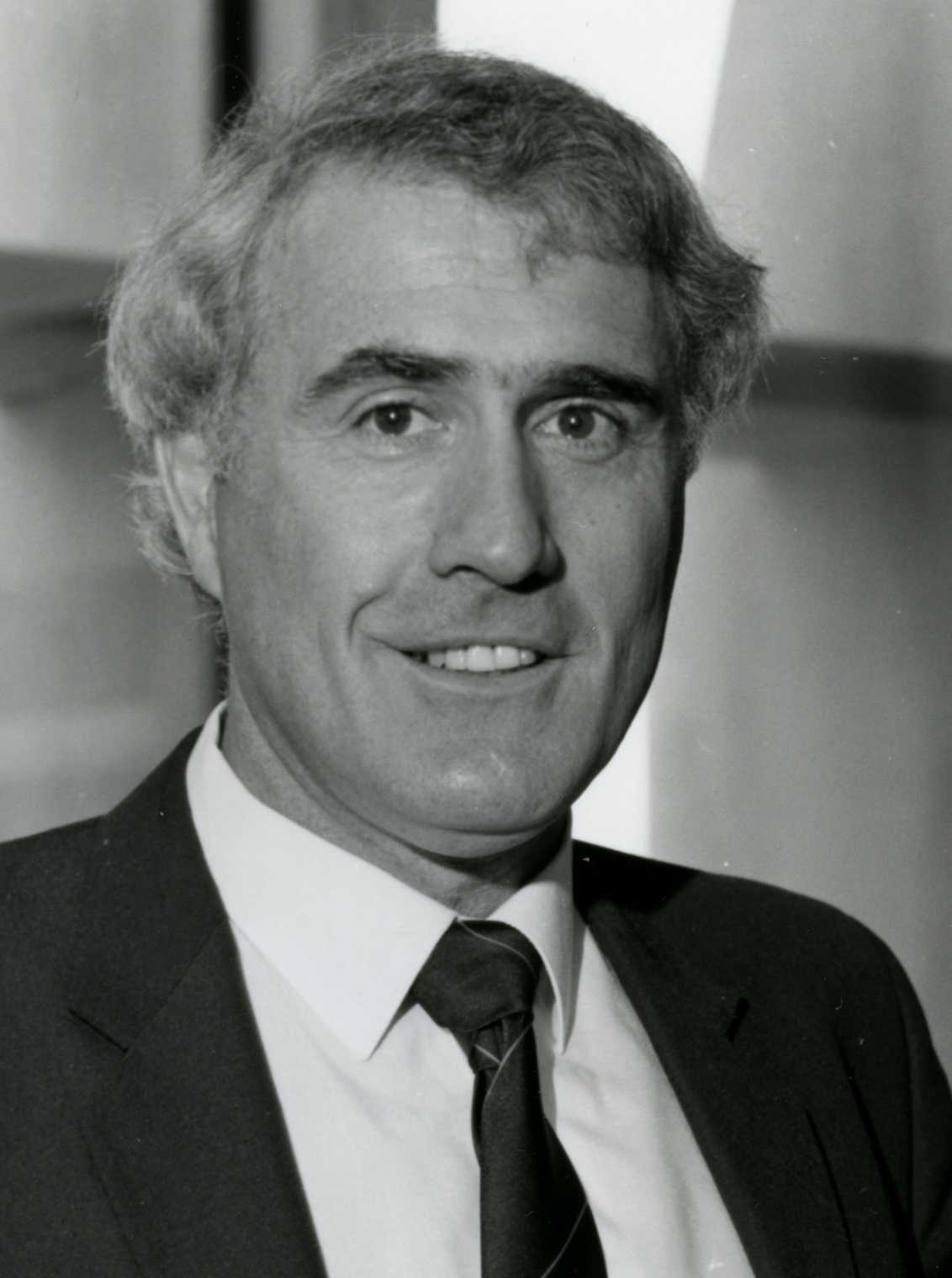
- Palmer as prime minister

33rd Prime Minister of New Zealand
- In office 8 August 1989 – 4 September 1990
- Monarch: Elizabeth II
- Governor-General: Paul Reeves
- Deputy: Helen Clark
- Preceded by: David Lange
- Succeeded by: Mike Moore

10th Leader of the New Zealand Labour Party
- In office 8 August 1989 – 4 September 1990
- Deputy: Helen Clark
- Preceded by: David Lange
- Succeeded by: Mike Moore

10th Deputy Prime Minister of New Zealand
- In office 26 July 1984 – 8 August 1989
- Prime Minister: David Lange
- Preceded by: Jim McLay
- Succeeded by: Helen Clark

26th Attorney-General
- In office 26 July 1984 – 4 August 1989
- Prime Minister: David Lange
- Preceded by: Jim McLay
- Succeeded by: David Lange

39th Minister of Justice
- In office 26 July 1984 – 8 August 1989
- Prime Minister: David Lange
- Preceded by: Jim McLay
- Succeeded by: Bill Jeffries

Member of the New Zealand Parliament for Christchurch Central
- In office 18 August 1979 – 27 October 1990
- Preceded by: Bruce Barclay
- Succeeded by: Lianne Dalziel

Personal details
- Born: Geoffrey Winston Russell Palmer; 21 April 1942 (age 84) Nelson, New Zealand
- Party: Labour
- Spouse: Margaret Hinchcliff (m. 1963)
- Children: 2, including Matthew Palmer
- Education: Victoria University of Wellington; University of Chicago Law School
- Occupation: Law professor
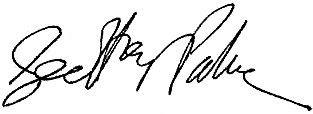
- Signature

Sir Geoffrey Winston Russell Palmer KCMG AC KC PC (born 21 April 1942) is a New Zealand lawyer, political scientist and former politician, who served as the 33rd prime minister of New Zealand for a little over a year from August 1989 until September 1990. A member of Parliament from 1979 to 1990, he spent six years as a senior member of the Fourth Labour Government.

The second New Zealand prime minister from Nelson, Palmer read political science and law at Victoria University of Wellington Te Herenga Waka. Completing a doctorate at the University of Chicago Law School, he then taught law as a full professor at the University of Iowa College of Law from age 27. Upon returning to New Zealand, Palmer taught law in Wellington and became active in the Labour Party from 1975. He won election to the New Zealand House of Representatives in the 1979 by-election for Christchurch Central.

As minister of justice from 1984 to 1989, Palmer was responsible for considerable reforms of the country's legal and constitutional framework, such as the creation of the Constitution Act 1986, New Zealand Bill of Rights Act 1990, Imperial Laws Application Act 1988, and the State Sector Act 1988. Palmer led a major role in organising former government services into state-owned enterprises (SOEs). For this reason he was associated with the transformative economic reforms known as Rogernomics, despite the fact he lacked a particular focus on economics and was not closely associated with the Backbone Club, the Labour ginger group behind them. However, his association with Roger Douglas encouraged him to keep his environment portfolio upon becoming Prime Minister, as his policies were popular with Labour's diminished left-wing base. An early advocate for MMP, Palmer gave up attempts at electoral reform and resigned in 1990 to mitigate Labour's anticipated defeat at that year's election.

Palmer is best remembered for his efforts towards constitutional reform as a minister and a scholar rather than for his brief premiership. He served as president of the New Zealand Law Commission from 2005 to 2010. In 2010 he was chosen to lead the UN Inquiry on the fatal Israeli raid on the Mavi Marmara. An advocate for New Zealand adopting a codified constitution, he authored A Constitution for Aotearoa New Zealand in September 2016 with academic Andrew Butler. He remains at Victoria University of Wellington's Faculty of Law as an honorary fellow, and teaches and writes about the intersection public law and constitutional values. In 2025, he made notable submissions against the controversial Treaty Principles Bill, a proposed reinterpretation of the Treaty of Waitangi that had inspired major protests.

== Early life and education ==
Palmer was born in Nelson. His father was Leonard Russell Palmer and his mother was Jessie Patricia (née Clark). He attended Nelson Central School, Nelson Intermediate School and Nelson College. At Victoria University of Wellington, he studied both political science and law. He graduated with a Bachelor of Arts degree in 1964 and a Bachelor of Laws in 1965.

While still at university, Palmer married Margaret Eleanor Hinchcliff in 1963. The couple went on to have two children, including Matthew Palmer.

After working for a time in Wellington, Palmer attended the University of Chicago Law School, gaining a Juris Doctor in 1967. He moved from New Zealand to Iowa in August 1969 to become a professor at the University of Iowa College of Law. In his first year, he taught the newly adapted small-section courses of American Property law, Conflict Resolution, and International law. He also developed the curriculum for a Torts course to be taught during the second year of law school. This was the first course of its kind in the United States and he was granted tenure in his second year of teaching at the college. In 1972, he left to be a visiting professor at the University of Virginia College of Law. Eventually, in 1974, he was appointed to a professorship of law at Victoria University of Wellington, bringing him back to New Zealand. At the 1975 general election, Palmer took part in the "Citizens for Rowling" campaign.

== Political career ==
=== Member of Parliament ===
New Zealand Parliament
Years	Term	Electorate	Party
1979–1981	39th	Christchurch Central	Labour
1981–1984	40th	Christchurch Central	Labour
1984–1987	41st	Christchurch Central	Labour
1987–1990	42nd	Christchurch Central	Labour

In a 1979 by-election, Palmer was elected to Parliament as the member for Christchurch Central, having stood as the Labour Party candidate. In March 1981 he was elevated to the shadow cabinet as spokesperson for constitutional affairs and associate spokesperson for justice. Following Labour's unexpected loss at the 1981 general election Palmer gained the social welfare and accident compensation portfolios.

In 1983, Palmer stood for the deputy leadership of the party. In a three-way contest, in which all candidates were from Christchurch to reflect geographical proportionality, Palmer trailed on the first ballot to Papanui MP Mike Moore. Lyttelton MP Ann Hercus was eliminated and on the second ballot almost all of her supporters voted for Palmer, who beat Moore by one vote. He became deputy Leader of the Opposition.

When, in 1984, the Labour Party won the general elections, Palmer became Deputy Prime Minister of the Fourth Labour Government. He also became Attorney-General and Minister of Justice. The new justice minister, who had promoted proportional representation as a law professor in his book Unbridled Power?, also published in 1984, set up a Royal Commission to investigate the electoral system and propose modifications or alternatives. His Royal Commission reported in December 1986, recommending the mixed-member proportional representation system. After the 1987 elections, when Labour was re-elected, he also became Minister of the Environment, an area in which he took personal interest.

=== Prime Minister (1989–1990) ===
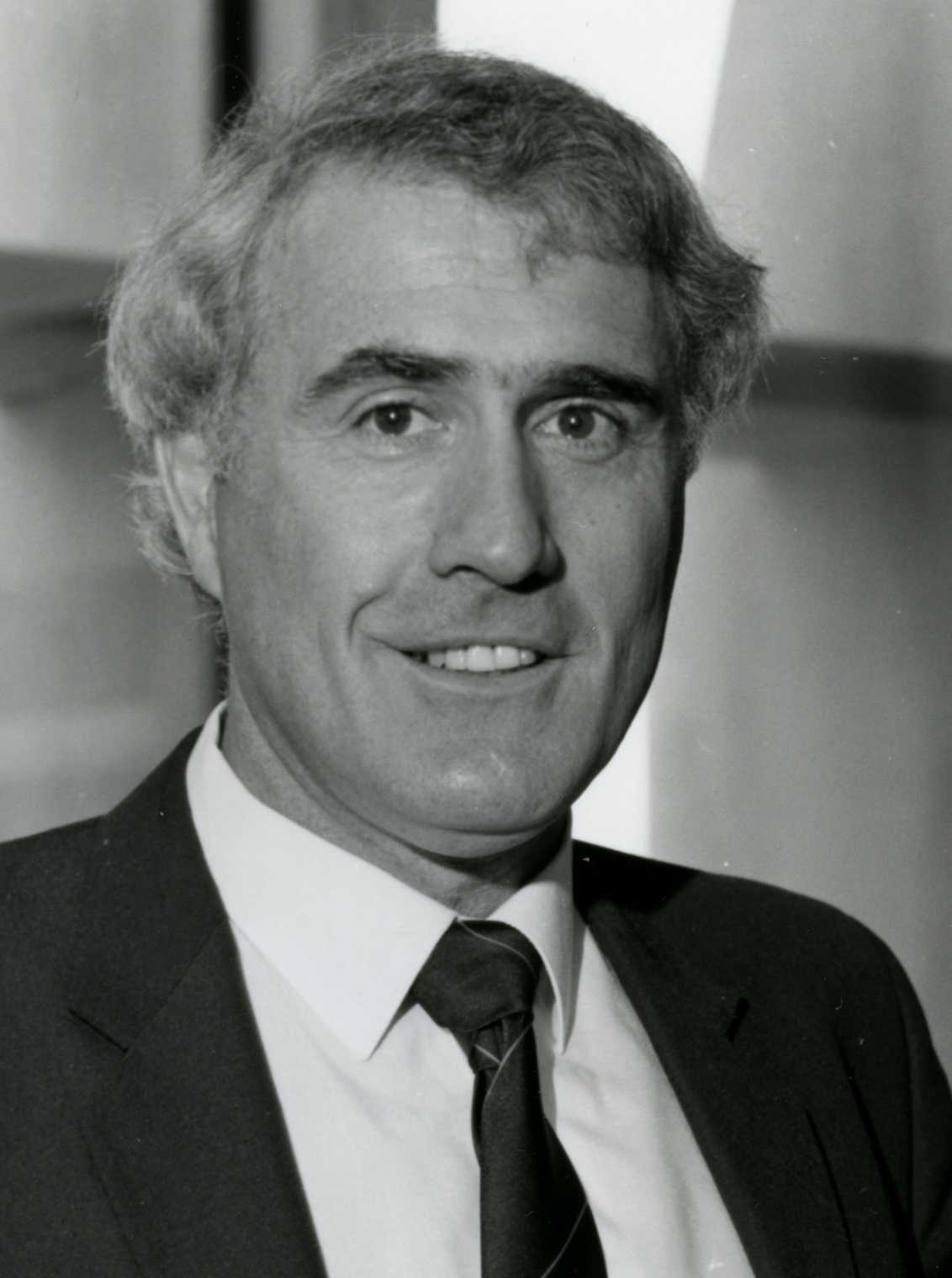
- Premiership of Geoffrey Palmer; 8 August 1989 – 4 September 1990
- Monarch: Elizabeth II
- Cabinet: Fourth Labour Government of New Zealand
- Party: New Zealand Labour Party
- Appointed by: Paul Reeves
- Seat: Premier House

The most notable feature of New Zealand politics at the time was the economic change promoted by the Finance Minister, Roger Douglas. Douglas was advancing monetarist policies involving extensive privatisation of state assets and the removal of tariffs and subsidies—these reforms were dubbed "Rogernomics". These policies, which contravened Labour's basic policy platform and campaign promises, were deeply unpopular with Labour's traditional support base, and resulted in a confrontation between Prime Minister David Lange and Roger Douglas. Lange also reneged from his promise to hold a binding referendum on the MMP system. Palmer conceded defeat on MMP at an April 1989 Labour regional conference, saying that the issue was "effectively dead for the immediate future." Eventually, Douglas was removed from Cabinet, but the dispute had weakened Lange enough that he resigned a month later. Palmer, being deputy leader, took over as prime minister. Electoral reformers in the Labour Party kept up the pressure, and in September 1989, after Palmer had become prime minister, the full annual conference of the Labour Party passed a remit endorsing a referendum on the principle of proportional representation.

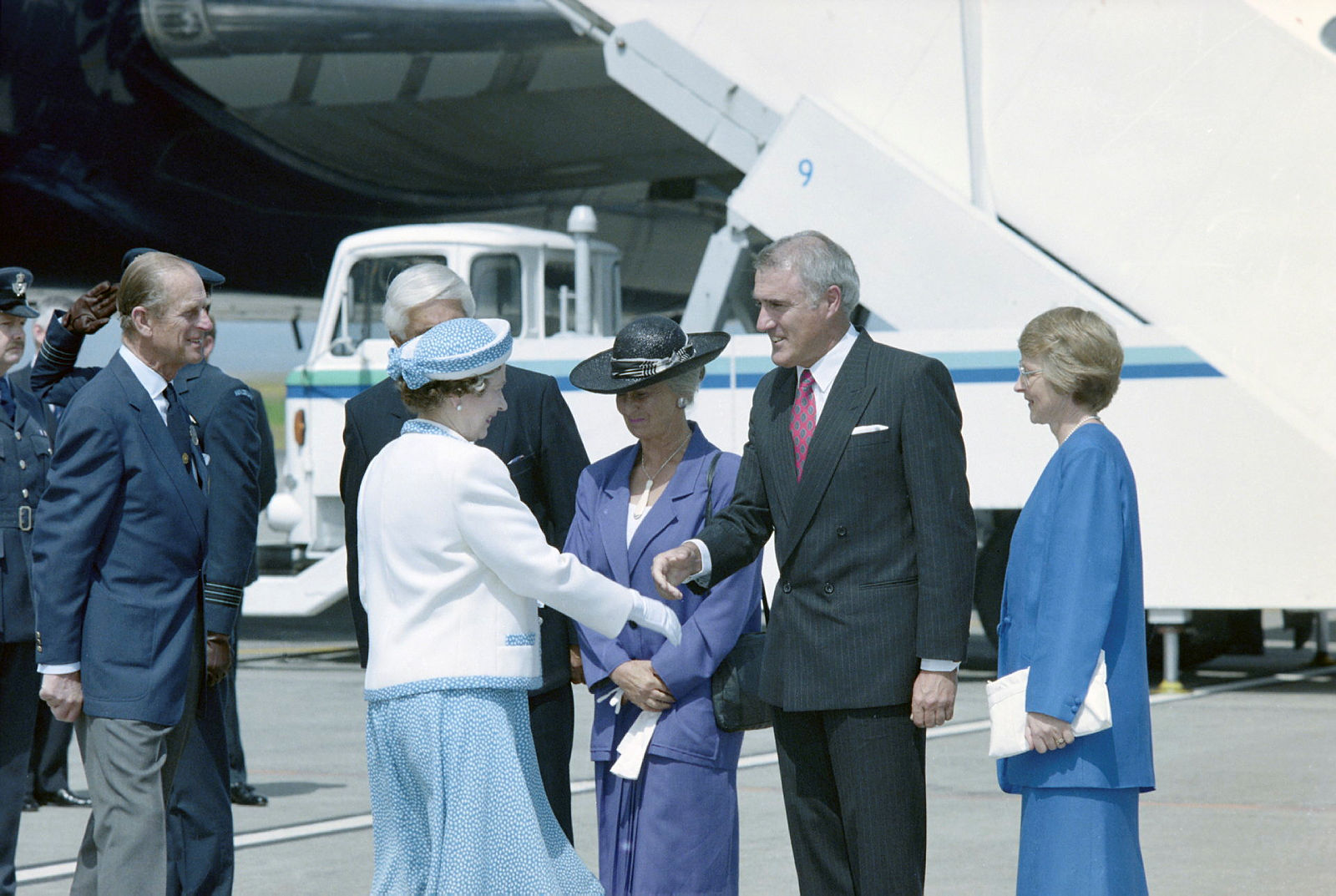
Prime Minister Palmer greets Queen Elizabeth II after her arrival at Auckland International Airport, 1990

Palmer, however, was perceived by the public as being too closely involved with Douglas's reforms. Of particular concern to many people was his work on the legal aspects of state sector rearrangement, such as his preparation of the State Owned Enterprises Act. The presence of David Caygill (a Douglas ally) as Minister of Finance further compounded perception that Palmer was doing nothing to address public concerns. The only area in which Palmer won praise from traditional left-wing supporters was in his handling of the Environment portfolio, which he kept when he became Prime Minister – it was his work here in initiating the resource management law reform process that eventually led to the creation of the Resource Management Act 1991.

Palmer later reflected on his brief premiership:

"I thought the Government was doomed actually, and my wife was absolutely of that opinion. But I thought I had a duty to do it and to try and get as many of the reforms completed as possible. We did complete a fair number. The Reserve Bank Act went through, the Public Finance Act went through, the Bill of Rights Act went through. I particularly wanted the New Zealand Bill of Rights Act, thank you very much."

Two months before the 1990 elections, it was clear that Labour would not be reelected. The perceived damage done by Roger Douglas's reforms, as well as Palmer's lack of general charisma, caused too many Labour supporters to abandon the party. In addition, Palmer was perceived as being too academic and aloof, reminding people of the paternalistic attitude that Douglas was accused of. Palmer resigned and was replaced by Overseas Trade Minister Mike Moore, who Labour believed would give it a better chance of winning. Palmer stated he had been prepared to lead the party to a likely defeat but was just as happy to step aside: "I was actually pretty pleased to get out at the end of 1990. I was quite happy to run through as PM and take the defeat, but if other people wanted to do it — be my guest!".

Palmer also chose to retire from parliament at the election, and was replaced as the Labour candidate in his seat by Lianne Dalziel. The leadership change failed, however, and the opposition National Party under Jim Bolger won a landslide victory.

Palmer became the first Labour leader to leave the party leadership without taking the party into an election since the modern party's first leader, Alfred Hindmarsh. Of the Labour Prime Ministers (notwithstanding Hugh Watt's tenure as interim prime minister following the death of Norman Kirk), Palmer is the only one who had not also served as Leader of the Opposition before and/or after his tenure as prime minister.

== After Parliament ==
Palmer later went on to serve as Professor of Law at Victoria University again. He also held a position as Professor of Law at the University of Iowa, and worked for a time as a law consultant. While at the University of Iowa he taught courses on International law and global environment issues as well as a two-week mini course about the International Court of Justice. The MMP system which he had helped promote was adopted in a 1993 referendum. In 1994, he established Chen Palmer & Partners, a specialist public law firm he began with Wellington lawyer Mai Chen. In September 2001 Palmer became a founding trustee of Motu Economic and Public Policy Research and in December 2002 was appointed to be New Zealand's representative to the International Whaling Commission (IWC). Palmer continued his involvement with, and teaching at Victoria University of Wellington and was regularly engaged as an expert consultant on public and constitutional law issues. As of 2022, Palmer is an honorary fellow in the Faculty of Law at Victoria University of Wellington, and coordinates and lectures a course on public law and constitutional values in relation to public inquiries. His son Matthew Palmer was also a prominent legal academic and public servant, and was appointed a High Court judge in 2015. Notable students of Palmer include Nicola Wheen.

=== Law Commissioner ===
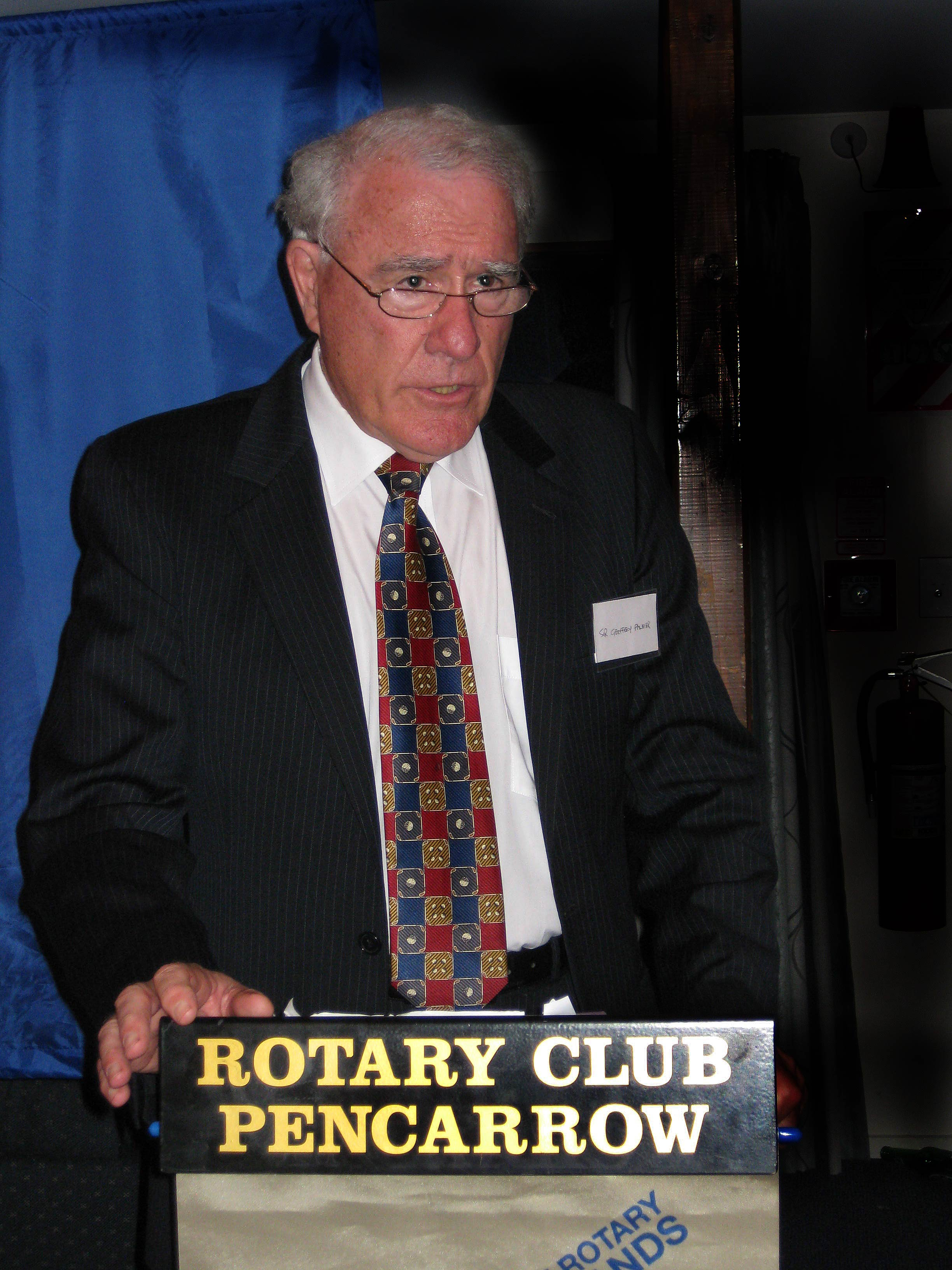
Palmer in 2007

On 1 December 2005, Palmer was appointed to the presidency of the New Zealand Law Commission (the government agency that reviews, reforms and seeks to improve the country's laws) by the Governor-General for a term of five years. During his tenure, he persuaded the Government to engage in a programme of reviewing the old Law Commission reports with a view to actioning them. This resulted in a number of existing reports being actioned. Palmer stepped down from the Law Commission at the end of his tenure on 1 December 2010.

=== UN Inquiry ===
In August 2010, Palmer was chosen to chair a UN Inquiry panel into the fatal Israeli raid on the Mavi Marmara, a Turkish ship participating in a Gaza-bound protest flotilla in May of that year. The panel included the outgoing Colombian President Álvaro Uribe as the Vice-chair, and representatives from Turkey and Israel. The report, released on 2 September 2011, found that Israel's "naval blockade was imposed as a legitimate security measure in order to prevent weapons from entering Gaza by sea and its implementation complied with the requirements of international law," and that Israeli soldiers enforcing the blockade faced "organized and violent resistance from a group of passengers" when they boarded the ship. However, the report also found that the Israeli soldiers responded with "excessive and unreasonable" force and recommended that Israel make "an appropriate statement of regret" and pay compensation.

=== Constitutional reform campaign ===
In September 2016, Palmer and legal academic Andrew Butler published A Constitution for Aotearoa New Zealand. In this book the pair outlined their arguments for New Zealand to adopt a codified constitution, and also drafted out what this would look like. They then invited public submissions on the subject online and spent a year promoting the book and their campaign. The pair released a second book in 2018, Towards Democratic Renewal, that amends some of their proposal in the previous text and further argues their cause for a codified constitution, taking on board the response of the public. This campaign is ongoing.

In January 2025, Palmer proposed 12 parliamentary reforms including raising the number of legislators, increasing the number of Parliament's sitting hours, extending the parliamentary term from three to four years, reforming the select committee system, introducing compulsory voting for general elections, lowering the voting age to 16 years, civics education in schools, appointing the Speaker of the New Zealand House of Representatives by secret ballot, reforming the Official Information Act 1982, limiting the amount that individuals can donate to political parties, creating a public register for lobbyists, and amending the Public Service Act 2020 to require public servants to provide "full and frank" advice on legislative proposals and to make that advice public.

In 2025, Palmer appeared at select committee and submitted against the proposed Treaty Principles Bill. He has been a harsh critic of the bill for its "eccentric" anachronistic interpretation of the Treaty of Waitangi, but also for the discourse around it: he said "little light has been cast so far on the real threat it poses to New Zealand’s democracy and society".

== Honours and awards ==
Palmer was appointed a member of Her Majesty's Privy Council in 1985. In 1990, he received the New Zealand 1990 Commemoration Medal. He was appointed a Knight Commander of the Order of St Michael and St George in the 1991 New Year Honours, and made an Honorary Companion of the Order of Australia in the same year. In 1991 he was listed on the United Nations Global 500 Roll of Honour for his work on environmental issues. These included reforming resource management law. Palmer also sat as a Judge ad hoc on the International Court of Justice in 1995. He holds honorary doctorates from three universities. In 2008 Palmer was one of the first people appointed as Senior Counsel during the temporary change from Queen's Counsel in the Helen Clark Government.

== Lectures ==
- Lecture entitled Perspectives on International Dispute Settlement from a Participant in the Lecture Series of the United Nations Audiovisual Library of International Law
- Constitutional change and democratic renewal on 9 October 2017 at TEDxVUW conference, Victoria University of Wellington.

== Notes ==
New Zealand Parliament
Preceded by Bruce Barclay	Member of Parliament for Christchurch Central; 1979–1990	Succeeded by Lianne Dalziel
Political offices
Preceded by Jim McLay	Attorney-General; 1984–1989	Succeeded by David Lange
Preceded by Jim McLay	Minister of Justice; 1984–1989	Succeeded by Bill Jeffries
Preceded by Jim McLay	Deputy Prime Minister of New Zealand; 1984–1989	Succeeded by Helen Clark
Preceded by Phil Goff	Minister for the Environment; 1987–1990	Succeeded by Simon Upton
Preceded by David Lange	Minister of Education; 1989	Succeeded by Phil Goff
Preceded by David Lange	Prime Minister of New Zealand; 1989–1990	Succeeded by Mike Moore
Party political offices
Preceded by David Lange	Deputy Leader of the Labour Party; 1983–1989	Succeeded by Helen Clark
Preceded by David Lange	Leader of the Labour Party; 1989–1990	Succeeded by Mike Moore
