= Taxation in New Zealand =

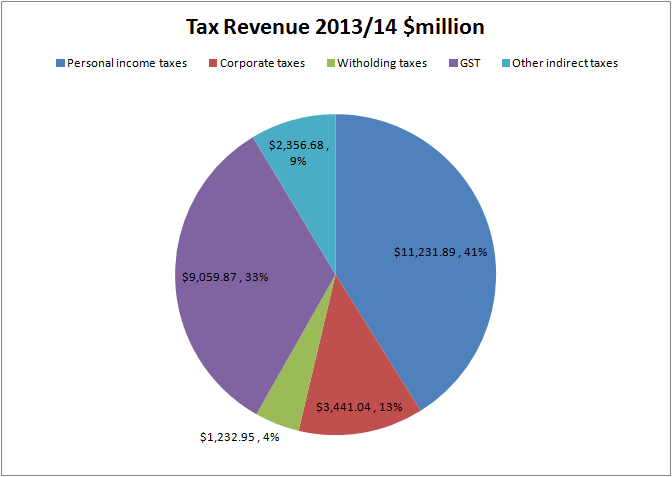

In New Zealand the Inland Revenue Department (IRD), a public service agency, collects taxes at a national level on behalf of the New Zealand Government. The state levies national taxes on personal and business income, and on the supply of goods and services. Capital-gains tax applies in limited situations, such as the sale of some rental properties within 10 years of purchase. Some "gains" such as profits on the sale of patent rights are taxed as income – income tax does apply to property transactions in certain circumstances, particularly speculation. As of 2026 there are no land taxes, but local property-taxes (rates) are managed and collected by local authorities. Some goods and services carry a specific tax, referred to as an excise or a duty, such as alcohol excise or gaming (gambling) duty. These are collected by a range of government agencies such as the New Zealand Customs Service. There is no social security (payroll) tax.

New Zealand went through a major program of tax reform in the 1980s. The top marginal rate of income tax reduced from 66% to 33% (changed to 39% in April 2000, to 38% in April 2009, to 33% on 1 October 2010 and back to 39% in April 2021) and corporate income-tax reduced from 48% to 28% (changed to 30% in 2008 and to 28% on 1 October 2010). Goods and services tax, introduced in 1986, initially applied at a rate of 10% (then 12.5% and now 15%, as of 1 October 2010). Land taxes were abolished in 1992. New Zealand lacks a tax on advertising.

Tax reform continues in New Zealand. Issues include:

- business taxes and the effect on productivity and competitiveness of NZ companies
- differences in the treatment of various types of investment income
- international tax rules

== Individual income tax ==
New Zealand has jurisdiction to tax individuals on the basis of residence and source. Subject to relief under a double tax agreement, New Zealand residents are liable to pay income tax on their worldwide income, whereas non-residents are only liable to pay tax on income derived from a New Zealand source.

=== History ===
Income tax was introduced in New Zealand by the Liberal Government in 1891. The tax did not apply to individuals with income less than £300 per annum, which exempted most of the population, and the top rate was 5%. Most government revenue came from customs, land, death and stamp duties. The top rate rose to 6.67% by 1914. During World War I, revenue from income tax increased greatly, becoming the largest source of tax, in place of customs duties. But, still only 12,000 people of an adult population of 700,000 earned above the £300 threshold and were taxed. The top rate was 43.75% in 1921. Tax rates were lowered in the 1920s and in 1930 the top income tax rate was set to 29.25%, and the threshold lowered to £260 of annual income. By 1939, and before World War II, the top rate was 42.9%. During the war, there were huge rises in the top rate, taking it to 90%. It dropped to 76.5 percent by the end of the 1940s. The working class still paid little or no income tax. The top rate was 60% in 1982, until Robert Muldoon's National Government raised it to 66% that year. The Fourth Labour Government, with David Lange as prime minister and Roger Douglas as finance minister, introduced a goods and services tax in 1986 and then reduced the top income tax rate from 66% to 48% in 1988 and then 33% in 1989. The Fifth Labour Government raised it to 39% in 2000. It was cut again by John Key's National government, and again a 39% rate was reintroduced by the Labour government in 2022.

As of 2014, NZ$29.8 billion (41%) of the New Zealand Government's core revenue of $72.5 billion was from individuals' income taxes.

=== Examples of taxable income ===
- salary and wages
- business and self-employed income
- income from investments (interest, dividends, certain property transactions, etc.)
- rental income
- overseas income (including income from an overseas pension)

A bright-line test on property speculation was introduced on 1 October 2015, specifying profit from certain purchases and sales of property as income. The test does not apply to profit from the family home, death estate, or property sold as part of a relationship settlement. The main aim of the test is to tax profits from property speculation. At the initial implementation in 2015, profit on houses bought and sold within two years were subject to income tax. The two-year threshold was extended to five years in 2018, and ten years in 2021.

Generally profits made from frequent stock trading will be deemed taxable income.

=== Tax rates ===
Income tax varies dependent on income levels in any specific tax year (personal tax years run from 1 April to 31 March).

==== 2021–2024 ====
Income	Tax rate	Effective tax rate	Max. tax of bracket	Cumulative tax
$0 – $14,000	10.5%	10.5%	$1,470	$1,470
$14,001 – $48,000	17.5%	10.5 - 15.5%	$5,950	$7,420
$48,001 – $70,000	30%	15.5 - 20.0%	$6,600	$14,020
$70,001 – $180,000	33%	20.0 - 28.0%	$36,300	$50,320
$180,001 –	39%	28.0 - 39.0%		$50,320 + 39%
No-notification rate	45%	45%		

Income is taxed by the amount that falls within each tax bracket. For example, persons who earn $70,000 will pay only 30% on the amount that falls between $48,001 and $70,000 rather than paying on the full $70,000. Consequently, the corresponding income tax for that specific income will accumulate to $14,020 – which amounts to an overall effective tax rate of 20.02% of the entire amount.

Rates are for the tax year 1 April 2021 to 31 March 2022, and are based on tax code M (primary income without student loan) and excludes the ACC earners' levy. The earners' levy rate (including GST) for the period 1 April 2022 to 31 March 2023 is 1.46% ($1.46 per $100).

=== Tax credits ===
The amount of tax actually payable can be reduced by claiming tax credits, e.g. donations to approved organisations, independent earners tax credit, and foreign tax credits.

=== Tax deducted at source ===
In most cases employers deduct the relevant amount of income tax from salary and wages prior to these being paid to the individual. This system, known as pay-as-you-earn, or PAYE, was introduced in 1958, prior to which employees paid tax annually.

In addition, entities who intend to make payments of interest, royalties, dividends or Maori authority distributions to a person must withhold a specified amount of income tax prior to making the payment. Depending on the residence of the recipient, this form of withholding tax is known as either resident withholding tax (RWT) or non-resident withholding tax (NRWT). Some entities, such as banks and financial institutions, may hold an RWT exemption certificate, meaning persons who make certain payments to them (such as borrowers paying interest) may not withhold RWT.

=== Double taxation agreements ===
Individuals who are tax resident in more than one country may be liable to pay tax more than once on the same income. New Zealand has double taxation agreements with various countries that set out which country will tax specific types of income.

These countries have double tax agreements with New Zealand
Australia	India	Russian Federation
Austria	Indonesia	Samoa
Belgium	Ireland	Singapore
Canada	Italy	South Africa
Chile	Japan	Spain
China	Korea	Sweden
Czech Republic	Malaysia	Switzerland
Denmark	Mexico	Taiwan
Fiji	Netherlands	Thailand
Finland	Norway	Turkey
France	Papua New Guinea	United Arab Emirates
Germany	Philippines	United Kingdom
Hong Kong	Poland	United States of America
Viet Nam		

Some agreements protect pension payments as well. The agreement with the United States, for example, prohibits New Zealand from taxing American social security or government pension payments, and the reverse is also true.

== ACC earner's levy ==
All employees pay an earner's levy to cover the cost of non-work related injuries. It is collected by Inland Revenue on behalf of the Accident Compensation Corporation (ACC).

The earner's levy is payable on salary and wages plus any other income that is subject to PAYE, for example overtime, bonuses or holiday pay. The levy is 1.39% for the year from 1 April 2017 to 31 March 2018. It is payable on income up to $124,053.

== Investment income ==
New Zealand taxes investment returns via specific regimes instead of a comprehensive capital gains tax.

=== Capital gains tax ===
Profits made from frequent stock trading or from the purchase and sale of investment property within a certain period of time is deemed to be income — and subject to income tax.

Profits made from trading cryptoassets are generally deemed to be income, although there may be exceptions — such as where crypto assets are purchased for their staking rewards.

=== Interest and dividends ===
Most interest and dividend payments incur Resident Withholding Tax (RWT) at the source. Portfolio Investment Entities (PIE) offer a tax cap of 28%, providing a potential structural benefit for individuals in the 33% and 39% tax brackets.

=== Foreign Investment Funds (FIF) ===
Residents holding over $50,000 in offshore equities generally enter the FIF regime. Taxpayers typically calculate liability using the Fair Dividend Rate (5% of the opening value) or the Comparative Value (actual total return) method.

=== Property and intent ===
The bright-line test taxes gains on residential property sold within a specific timeframe. For property acquired on or after 1 July 2024, this period is two years. Additionally, any asset bought with the specific intention of resale is subject to income tax on profit, regardless of the holding period.

=== Additional Context: Trust tax alignment ===
In April 2024, the government increased the trustee tax rate from 33% to 39%. This change aligns the trust rate with the top personal income tax bracket, aiming to reduce the use of trusts as a vehicle for income splitting and tax avoidance.

== Business taxes ==
=== Business income tax ===
Businesses in New Zealand pay income tax on their net profit earned in any specific tax year. For most businesses the tax year runs from 1 April to 31 March but businesses can apply to the Inland Revenue for this to be changed.

A provisional taxpayer is a person or a company that had a residual income tax of more than $5000 in the previous tax year. This means that taxpayers with residual income tax in the prior year of less than $5,000 do not need to pay provisional tax for the current year.

There are four methods for paying provisional tax; standard method, estimated method, accounting information method and GST Ratio option.

- The standard method is the most common method for provisional taxpayers. Under the standard method, provisional taxpayers make three provisional tax instalments through the year based on the previous years tax liability, uplifted by 5 or 10%.
- The second most common method is the estimation method. Estimation allows the business owner to pay less or more tax depending on how they think their business is performing, and therefore what they expect their tax liability will be at year end. Underpayments are subject to a high use of money interest rate, while significantly less interest is paid on overpayments, so it is important that they estimate their profit accurately.
- A provisional tax payer can also pay provisional tax using the GST ratio option. This is based on their previous year's residual tax liability and what their GST Taxable supplies were for that year. The tax payer then applies this percentage to their current period GST return. Under this option, provisional tax is paid at the same time as GST.

At the end of the year the business files a tax return (due on the following 7 July for businesses with a tax year ending 31 March) and any under or overpayment is then calculated. Tax pooling was introduced in 2003 to remove some of the worry associated with estimating provisional tax payments by allowing businesses to pool their payments together so the underpayments by some can be offset by the overpayments of others to reduce/enhance the interest they pay/receive.

Companies pay income tax at 28% on profits. Tax rates for individuals operating as a business (that is, individuals who are self-employed) are the same as for employees. (See individual tax rates, above.)

New Zealand also has tax incentives available to businesses to offset tax. The Research and Development Tax Incentive (RDTI) provides a 15% tax credit for qualifying expenditure on eligible R&D activities.

The tax credit can be used to reduce a company’s income tax liability.

=== Goods and Services Tax ===
Goods and services tax (GST) is an indirect tax introduced in New Zealand in 1986. This represented a major change in New Zealand taxation policy as until this point almost all revenue had been raised via direct taxes. GST makes up 24% of the New Zealand Government's core revenue as of 2013.

Most products or services sold in New Zealand incur GST at a rate of 15%. The main exceptions are financial services (e.g. banking and life insurance) and the export of goods and services overseas.

All businesses are required to register for GST once their turnover exceeds (or is likely to exceed) $60,000 per annum. Once registered, businesses charge GST on all goods and services they supply and can reclaim any GST they have been charged on goods and services they have purchased.

=== Fringe benefit tax ===
Employers are liable to pay fringe benefit tax (FBT) on benefits given to employees in addition to their salary or wages (e.g. motor vehicles or low interest loans). There are several methods available for calculating FBT liability, including an option of paying a flat rate of 49.25% on all benefits provided.

=== Excise duties ===
Excise or duty is charged on a number of products, including alcohol products, tobacco products, and some fuels.

== Land taxes ==
New Zealand makes a distinction between "land taxes" and "property taxes". The traditional concept of property tax may apply the same rate both to improvement values and to land values. A pure land tax exempts improvement values from taxation altogether and taxes only land values. A graded, dual-rate, or split-rate property tax applies a different rate to improvement values. The term "land tax valuation" is used to represent both its pure and partial forms. Conceptually, a property tax is a proxy for income tax - rightly or wrongly presuming that a certain level of property holdings indicate a certain ability to pay taxes on a regular basis. In contrast, an LVT applies to the land itself – taking into account its scarcity, immovability and centrality to human activity.

Although the Land Tax Abolition Act (1990) which took effect from 31 March 1992 abolished New Zealand's land tax, a land tax was the very first direct tax ever imposed on New Zealanders, by the Land Tax Act (1878). A property tax followed the next year (per the Property Tax Act 1879). When first enacted, this charged a rate of one penny in the pound (i.e. 1/240th or 0.4%), but a massive £500 exemption applied, exempting most people from tax liability.

The land tax initially provided a major proportion of government revenue. In 1895 it made up 76% of the total land and income tax revenue received by the government. In 1960 land tax contributed 6% of direct tax revenues, and by 1967, in a report recommending the abolition of land taxes, a committee chaired by Auckland accountant Lewis Ross noted that a mere 0.5% of total government revenue now came from land taxes. The government did not act on the Ross recommendation to abolish land taxes.

By 1982 only 5% of total land value was taxed, and land taxes were also thought to be duplicative due to their similarity to local-authority property-rate levies, with property taxes (rates) making up 57% of local-government income by 2001.

The Labour government elected in 1984 moved away from taxes on capital in all forms, and in 1990 Parliament passed the Land Tax Abolition Act (1990), ending New Zealand's history of central government taxing land. Later LVT discussions produced no change.

== See also ==
- Tax Working Group
- Absentee Tax, historical
