= Michael Cullen (politician) =

New Zealand politician (1945–2021)

The Honourable Sir Michael Cullen KNZM
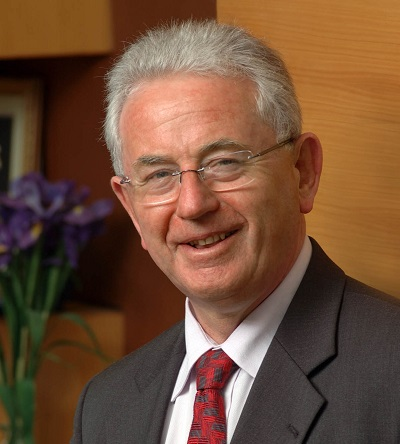
- Official portrait of Cullen, 2008

16th Deputy Prime Minister of New Zealand
- In office 15 August 2002 – 19 November 2008
- Prime Minister: Helen Clark
- Preceded by: Jim Anderton
- Succeeded by: Bill English

31st Attorney-General of New Zealand
- In office 21 March 2006 – 19 November 2008
- Prime Minister: Helen Clark
- Preceded by: David Parker
- Succeeded by: Chris Finlayson
- In office 28 February 2005 – 19 October 2005
- Prime Minister: Helen Clark
- Preceded by: Margaret Wilson
- Succeeded by: David Parker

40th Minister of Finance
- In office 10 December 1999 – 19 November 2008
- Prime Minister: Helen Clark
- Preceded by: Bill Birch
- Succeeded by: Bill English

26th Minister of Revenue
- In office 10 December 1999 – 17 October 2005
- Prime Minister: Helen Clark
- Preceded by: Bill Birch
- Succeeded by: Peter Dunne

4th Treasurer of New Zealand
- In office 10 December 1999 – 15 August 2002
- Prime Minister: Helen Clark
- Preceded by: Bill English
- Succeeded by: Position Abolished

13th Deputy Leader of the Labour Party
- In office 11 June 1996 – 11 November 2008
- Leader: Helen Clark
- Preceded by: David Caygill
- Succeeded by: Annette King

18th Minister for Social Welfare
- In office 24 August 1987 – 2 November 1990
- Prime Minister: David Lange; Geoffrey Palmer; Mike Moore
- Preceded by: Ann Hercus
- Succeeded by: Jenny Shipley
Parliamentary offices
Member of the New Zealand Parliament for Labour party list
In office 27 November 1999 – 30 April 2009
Succeeded by	Damien O'Connor (Note: Normally, list MPs do not have individual predecessors or successors, but Cullen resigned during a sitting parliament and therefore was succeeded by O'Connor.)
Member of the New Zealand Parliament for St Kilda Dunedin South (1996–1999)
In office 28 November 1981 – 27 November 1999
Preceded by	Bill Fraser
Succeeded by	David Benson-Pope

Personal details
- Born: 5 February 1945 London, England
- Died: 19 August 2021 (aged 76) Whakatāne, New Zealand
- Party: Labour
- Spouses: Rowena Joy Knight (m. 1967; div. 1989) Anne Collins (m. 1989)
- Profession: Historian

Academic background
- Education: University of Canterbury (BA & MA); University of Edinburgh (PhD)
- Thesis: Social statistics in Britain 1830–1852 (1971)

Academic work
- Discipline: History
- Institutions: University of Otago

Sir Michael John Cullen KNZM (5 February 1945 – 19 August 2021) was a New Zealand politician. He was a Member of the New Zealand House of Representatives from 1981 to 2009, the Deputy Leader of the New Zealand Labour Party from 1996 to 2008 and a senior minister in the Fifth Labour Government from 1999 to 2008, serving as Deputy Prime Minister, Minister of Finance, and Attorney-General.

Cullen was first elected in 1981 as the Member of Parliament for St Kilda after a ten-year career as a history lecturer at the University of Otago. He was a junior minister in the second term of the Fourth Labour Government, where his appointments as Minister of Social Welfare and Associate Minister of Finance were intended by Prime Minister David Lange to temper the government's economic reforms known as Rogernomics. When Helen Clark became Labour's leader in opposition from 1993, Cullen became the Labour Party's finance spokesperson. Later, he became Clark's deputy leader and served as her deputy prime minister from 2002 to 2008.

In his post-parliamentary career, Cullen was involved in public governance as the chair of New Zealand Post and the Earthquake Commission. He co-led a review of the intelligence and security sector with Dame Patsy Reddy for the Fifth National Government and chaired the Sixth Labour Government's Tax Working Group. In 2020, Cullen retired from public life after revealing he had been diagnosed with stage 4 small-cell lung cancer, which had also spread to his liver. He died of cancer the following year.

== Early life and education ==
Cullen was born in Enfield in north London on 5 February 1945, the son of Ivy May Cullen (née Taylor) and John Joseph Thomas Cullen. His father was a spectacle frame maker and his mother was a secretary.

He attended West Green and later North Harringay schools (both in Harringay) the latter of which was close to his maternal grandparents house. When his paternal grandmother died in 1953 his family received a modest inheritance and considered moving to a better house elsewhere in London before instead deciding to move to New Zealand.

The family emigrated from Tottenham to New Zealand in 1955, where friends gave him the nick-name "Pom", and Cullen attended secondary school on a scholarship at Christ's College in Christchurch. He went on to study history at the University of Canterbury, earning a Bachelor of Arts degree in 1965, and a Master of Arts in 1968. His masters thesis was titled Poverty in London, 1885-95.

Receiving a Commonwealth Scholarship he then gained a PhD in social and economic history from the University of Edinburgh. He was the first person in his family to attend university. From 1971 to 1981 he was a lecturer at the University of Otago, with a term as a visiting fellow at the Australian National University from 1975 to 1976. One of his students was future MP Michael Laws, whom he called a "very bright student, but you knew there was something not quite right, even then."

Whilst Cullen was researching his thesis on poverty in the late 19th century in London he discovered that the street in which his maternal grandparents grew up was famed for semi-criminal activities. They proceeded to become "working class respectables" and then his father became a semi-skilled tradesman.

Cullen became a naturalised New Zealand citizen in 1975.

== Member of Parliament ==
New Zealand Parliament
Years	Term	Electorate	List	Party
1981–1984	40th	St Kilda		Labour
1984–1987	41st	St Kilda		Labour
1987–1990	42nd	St Kilda		Labour
1990–1993	43rd	St Kilda		Labour
1993–1996	44th	St Kilda		Labour
1996–1999	45th	Dunedin South	2	Labour
1999–2002	46th	List	2	Labour
2002–2005	47th	List	2	Labour
2005–2008	48th	List	2	Labour
2008–2009	49th	List	2	Labour

Cullen joined the Labour Party in 1974, and served on the party's Executive and Council between 1976 and 1981. At the 1981 general election he was elected MP for the Dunedin electorate of St Kilda. In 1983 he was appointed Labour's spokesperson for the environment. In his first several years in parliament he had deliberately avoided his previous career focuses (of welfare and finance) to avoid being "pigeonholed" in those areas.

=== Fourth Labour Government ===
When Labour entered government in 1984, Cullen became Senior Whip. Due to his knowledge of economics, Cullen became increasingly involved in the disputes surrounding the Minister of Finance, Roger Douglas, who supported the liberalisation of trade and the sale of state assets plus deep tax cuts. These goals, which were against traditional Labour policies, angered both party members and the public. When the Prime Minister, David Lange, attempted to limit the influence Douglas had on the government's direction, Cullen became involved on Lange's side. After Labour's re-election in 1987, Cullen was made Associate Minister of Finance (an attempt by Lange to provide an anti-reform counterbalance to the radical Douglas) and Minister of Social Welfare. There were two other associate finance ministers (David Butcher and Peter Neilson) both of whom were on side with Douglas' reforms so Cullen's ability to temper financial policies were minimal. Of the three he was the more senior and deputised for Douglas when he was unable to attend parliamentary sessions.

He implemented the Puao-te-Ata-tu report which reorganised the administration of welfare provisions in relation to Māori and passed the Children, Young Persons, and Their Families Act. Soon after Cullen had been elevated to Cabinet, his father died following a long and painful illness, his marriage ended, and his dog died prompting him to ponder resigning; "I seriously considered quitting from Cabinet, but the least I could do was stay there for Helen [Clark] and David [Lange] and make sure we didn't lose social policy to the Rogernomes who were driving so much of the policy."

Eventually, Douglas was forced to resign, but a month later the political controversies around the dispute prompted the resignation of Lange himself. Douglas was succeeded as Finance Minister by David Caygill, one of his allies (albeit a considerably less radical one). Cullen was made Associate Minister of Health, in an attempt reduce the effect of reforms on that sector.

In 1989 he married fellow Labour MP Anne Collins.

=== Opposition ===
When Labour lost the 1990 election – attributed to public anger at Douglas' reforms, and disarray within the Labour Party – Cullen returned to being Labour's spokesperson on social welfare. The following year he replaced David Caygill as Shadow Minister of Finance, Cullen being seen as more fiscally moderate to help blunt the growth of the newly formed Alliance party (which was made up largely of Labour dissidents). After Labour's narrow defeat at the 1993 election, Helen Clark won the leadership of the party. At the same time Cullen ran to replace her as deputy leader, but was defeated by Caygill by the narrow margin of 23 votes to 21.

Before Labour's position in the polls improved, Cullen was also involved in an attempt to oust Clark as party leader, which was not successful. Soon after, when Caygill decided to retire from politics in 1996, Cullen took the deputy leader's post unopposed as well. Cullen has claimed to be happy with his position as second, saying that in terms of personality, he is "a number two sort of person". Many commentators agree, believing that Cullen's strength lies more in administration than leadership.

On 26 August 1999, Cullen was named by the Speaker Doug Kidd for saying that the National Member Max Bradford had lied, and that he was a "stooge" of the Employers Federation.

=== Fifth Labour Government ===
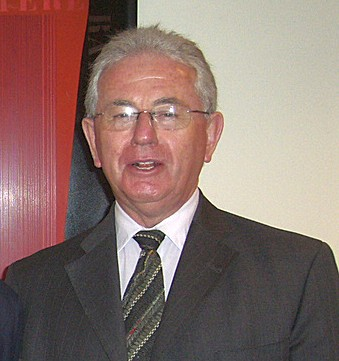
Cullen in 2007

Prior to the 1999 New Zealand general election, Cullen and his family moved to Napier, prompting him to stand down as Labour's candidate in his Dunedin South electorate at the upcoming election as it would have been to difficult to have a family base in Napier, while also being in Dunedin for electorate business and Wellington for Parliamentary business. After Labour MP Geoff Braybrooke signalled his intention to retire in 1999, Cullen expressed interest in running for Braybrooke's Napier electorate seat, although after Braybrooke reversed his decision Cullen decided to contest the 1999 election as a list only candidate. As Deputy leader Cullen was guaranteed the number 2 placing on Labour's list and Labour's electoral victory in 1999 resulted in Cullen easily being returned to Parliament as a List MP and becoming Minister of Finance.

As Minister of Finance, Cullen delivered nine consecutive budget surpluses, the longest unbroken run by any finance minister since the 1940s. After the government's defeat in 2008, his successor Bill English praised the Labour government, telling reporters that New Zealand was starting from a “reasonable position” due to Cullen's budgets “saving up for” a rainy day fund in dealing with the 2008 financial crisis.

After the 2002 election, the electoral support for Labour's junior coalition partner (the Progressive Party) was not sufficient to justify its leader holding the Deputy Prime Minister position, resulting in Michael Cullen replacing Jim Anderton as Deputy Prime Minister.

In 2005 Helen Clark appointed Cullen to the post of Attorney-General following the election of Margaret Wilson as Speaker of the House. His appointment became controversial because of his non-legal background (only one other non-lawyer had previously held the post) and because of his previous criticisms of the judiciary, including of the Chief Justice Dame Sian Elias. His term in the position ended following the 2005 general election. However, with the resignation of David Parker in March 2006, Cullen took over the position again.

He had a reputation as one of the Labour Party's best parliamentary debaters, and is known for his sometimes "acerbic" sense of humour.

==== Budget 2006 ====
Cullen presented his seventh budget in 2006. Cullen's guiding principle was, he stated, "The fool who spends on the upturn will find himself broke on the downturn".

==== Budget 2007 ====
Labour's eighth budget in 2007 reduced company tax from 33% to 30% and introduced a 15% research and development tax credit. It also made a number of changes to the KiwiSaver scheme.

==== Budget 2008 ====
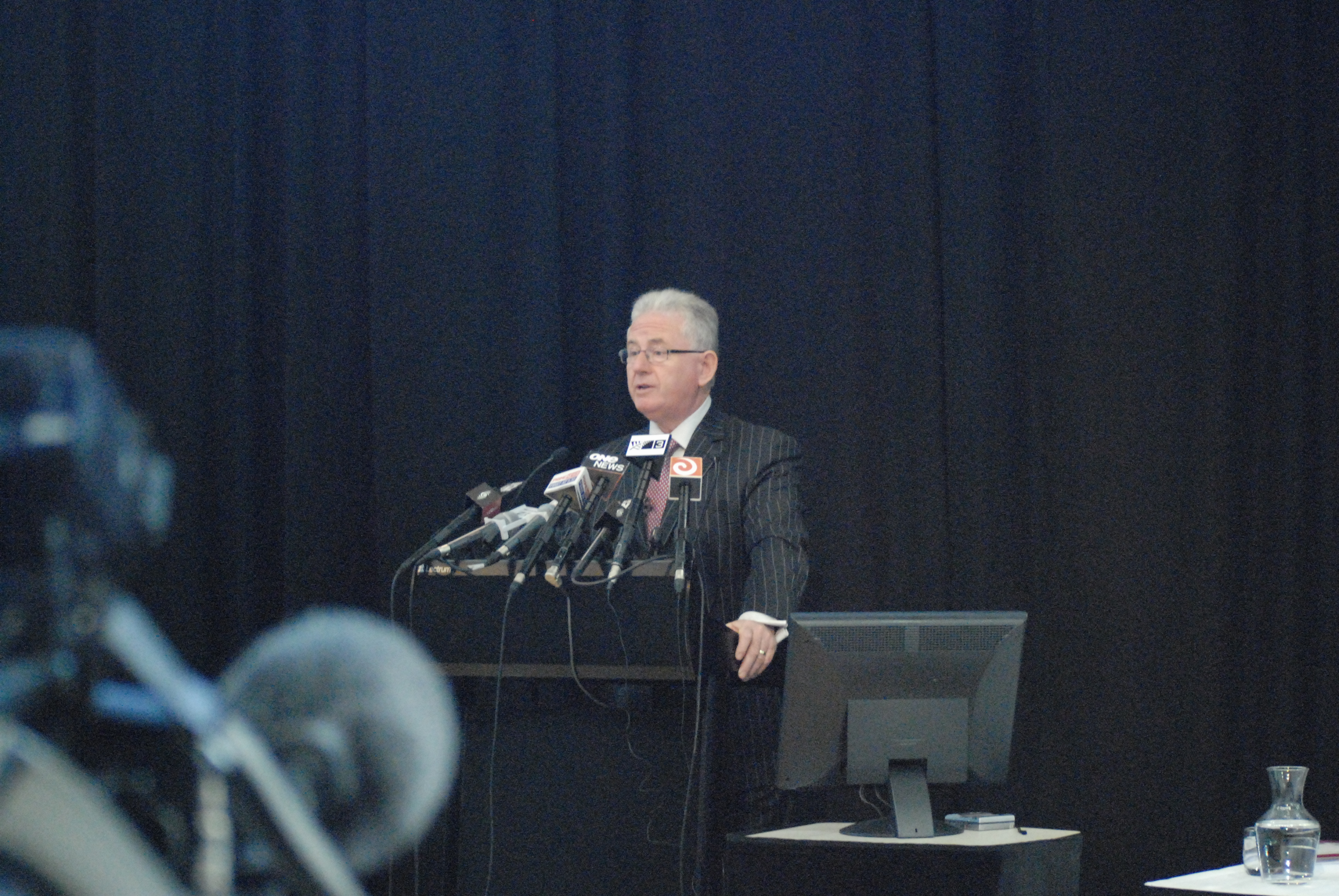
Cullen delivering the 2008 budget press conference

The New Zealand economy entered recession in December 2007. Cullen's final budget was delivered in this context in May 2008; it reduced income tax on the first $9,500 earned from 15% to 12.5%, and the company tax rate from 30% to 29%.

=== Resignation and retirement from politics ===
The day after the defeat of Labour in the 2008 general elections and Helen Clark's resignation as party leader, Cullen announced his resignation as deputy leader of the Labour Party. Phil Goff was elected the new leader and Annette King succeeded him as deputy leader. Goff appointed Cullen as Shadow Leader of the House and Spokesperson for Treaty of Waitangi Negotiations.

When he resigned from Parliament in 2009 he was replaced as an MP from the party list by Damien O'Connor.

== Political views ==
Cullen identified as a social democrat.

In 2004 Cullen declared his support for the monarchy of New Zealand, describing himself as "a sort of token monarchist in the Cabinet these days". However, in 2010 he repudiated that stance, taking the view that New Zealand should move towards a republic once the Queen's reign ends.

Cullen voted in favour of the third reading of the Civil Union Bill 2004, which legalised civil unions in New Zealand. In 2020 he declared his support for the End of Life Choice Bill.

Despite his opposition to a capital gains tax during his term as finance minister on grounds that it was "political suicide", as the head of the Tax Working Group appointed by Jacinda Ardern, he recommended one in 2019. Cullen changed his views and saw the tax as necessary to reduce inequality in New Zealand. Cullen was being paid more than $1000 a day as chairman of the Tax Working Group.

== Post politics ==
After leaving parliament, Cullen held a number of public roles, including serving on the Constitutional Advisory Panel, the Tax Working Group and chairing the boards of New Zealand Post and the Earthquake Commission. He was appointed to chair the Bay of Plenty District Health Board after the 2019 local elections. He also joined the board of retirement insurance business Lifetime Income.

In March 2020, Cullen stood down from most of his public roles after announcing that he had been diagnosed with stage IV small-cell lung cancer. His memoir, Labour Saving, was published in June 2021. He died of the illness in Whakatāne on 19 August 2021, aged 76.

== Honours and awards ==
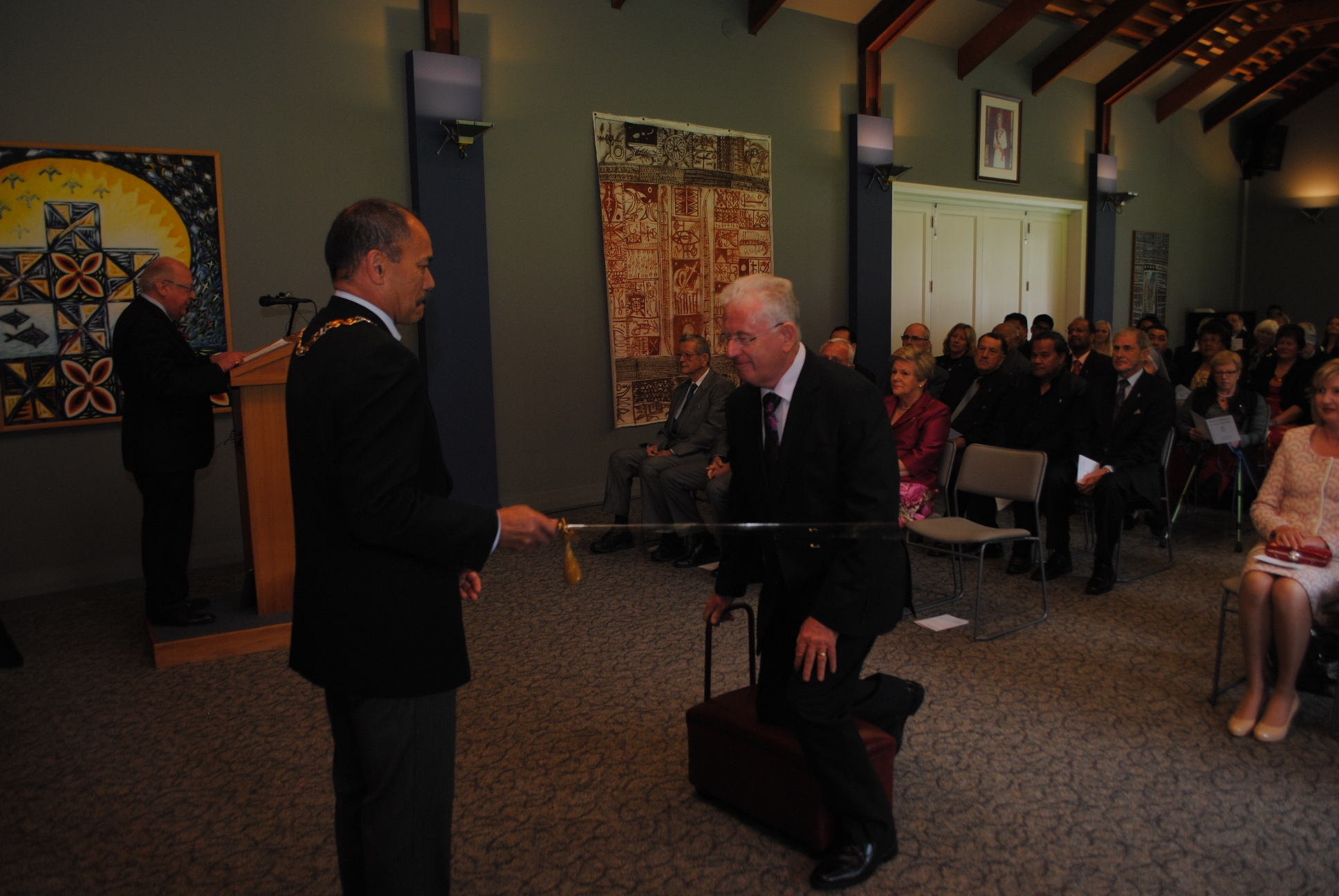
Cullen's investiture as a Knight Companion of the New Zealand Order of Merit in 2012 by Governor-General Sir Jerry Mateparae

In 1990, Cullen was awarded the New Zealand 1990 Commemoration Medal. On 16 December 2009, he received an honorary LLD from the University of Otago in recognition of "his contributions as an Otago academic and as a respected and highly influential politician".

In the 2012 Queen's Birthday and Diamond Jubilee Honours, Cullen was appointed Knight Companion of the New Zealand Order of Merit.

== Notes ==
New Zealand Parliament
Preceded by Bill Fraser	Member of Parliament for St Kilda; 1981–1996	Constituency abolished
New constituency	Member of Parliament for Dunedin South; 1996–1999	Succeeded by David Benson-Pope
Political offices
Preceded by Jim Anderton	Deputy Prime Minister of New Zealand; 2002–2008	Succeeded by Bill English
Preceded by Bill Birch	Minister of Finance; 1999–2008	Succeeded by Bill English
Preceded by Margaret Wilson	Attorney-General; 2005 2006–2008	Succeeded by David Parker
Preceded by David Parker	Attorney-General; 2005 2006–2008	Succeeded by Chris Finlayson
Preceded by Ann Hercus	Minister for Social Welfare; 1987–1990	Succeeded by Jenny Shipley
Party political offices
Preceded by David Caygill	Deputy Leader of the New Zealand Labour Party; 1996–2008	Succeeded by Annette King
Preceded by Jonathan Hunt	Senior Whip of the Labour Party; 1984–1987	Succeeded by Margaret Austin
Honorary titles
Preceded by Helen Clark	Father of the House; 2009	Succeeded by Jim Anderton
