= Child support (disambiguation) =

Child support is an ongoing, periodic payment made by a parent for the financial benefit of a child.

Child support may also refer to:

- Child support in the United States
- Child support (New Zealand), how child support is regulated and managed in New Zealand
- Child Support (game show), a 2018 American game show
- "Child Support" (song), by Barbara Mandrell, 1987

== See also ==
- Alimony
