= Tax pooling =

Tax pooling allows New Zealand taxpayers to pool their provisional tax payments together in an account held by a registered tax pooling intermediary at Inland Revenue (IRD) so that underpayments by some can be offset by overpayments of others. Taxpayers receive/pay an interest rate that is higher/lower than IRD's rates if they overpay/underpay provisional tax. Intermediaries operate under legislation set out in the Income Tax Act 2007 and Tax Administration Act 1994.

Tax pooling has been operating in New Zealand since 2003 after legislation was passed by the New Zealand Government. Tax Management NZ (TMNZ) was the first intermediary to offer the service.

Accountants across New Zealand recommend the use of tax pooling to taxpayers to manage income tax obligations.

== Background ==
Taxpayers in New Zealand with an income tax liability of more than $5,000 for the previous year may have to pay provisional tax the following year. This usually happens if they earn income without having tax deducted during the year.

Often the amount of income tax a taxpayer must pay is uncertain as provisional tax payments are based on an estimation of annual profit.

If a taxpayer does not pay enough provisional tax, it may be charged IRD interest (also known as use of money interest). On the other hand, if it pays too much provisional tax, it may receive an interest credit. The use of money interest rate for underpayments is higher than that applying to overpayments. In some cases, the underpayment rate is higher than a taxpayer's borrowing rate.

Both overpaid and underpaid provisional tax have financial consequences. Overpaid provisional tax results in money that a taxpayer could use in its business being tied up at IRD at a cost to the taxpayer. Underpaid provisional means a taxpayer is faced with an unexpected interest cost on top of its liability. Many taxpayers consider the overpayment interest rate does not adequately compensate them and the interest charged on underpayments is too high.

Officials acknowledged that the provisional tax rules resulted in uncertainty for taxpayers because they assume taxpayers can correctly forecast their income for the year.

A proposed change to the use of money interest rates did not find favour with IRD. They considered that idea to be unworkable, arguing that the underpayment rate needs to be set high to ensure taxpayers pay the right amount of tax at the right time. It also suggested that an additional penalty for underpayments may be required to ensure the right incentives were in place to encourage compliance from taxpayers if the underpayment rate was reduced.

In 2001, IRD publicly raised the possibility of having a system that allowed provisional taxpayers to pool their payments through a commercial intermediary so the interest charged on underpayments and paid on overpayments would be closer to normal commercial interest rates, avoiding the current wide differential.

== Ian Kuperus ==
Ian Kuperus, an accountant and former IRD employee, is credited with coming up with the idea of tax pooling. He identified the opportunity for taxpayers to trade their under- and overpayments of tax and take advantage of the interest rate differential while leading the tax division at the National Bank, after the government introduced use of money interest in 1988.

With the backing of National Bank, Ian pitched tax pooling to IRD and the then Minister of Revenue, Trevor de Cleene. However, neither party was convinced. He continued to promote the concept in submissions to IRD and one to the McLeod Review of Taxation when moved to the New Zealand Dairy Board (now Fonterra).

In 2001, when IRD publicly raised the possibility of trading provisional tax payments as a means of reducing exposure to use of money interest, Ian engaged with IRD officials by helping to write legislation and come up with an actual system that would bring together taxpayers, an independent intermediary and IRD.

He left the Dairy Board a year later to establish Tax Management NZ.

In 2021, Ian committed 100% of profits from Tax Management NZ to the Whakatupu Aotearoa Foundation.

== How tax pooling works ==
Tax deposit

Rather than pay provisional tax directly to IRD, a taxpayer deposits money with a tax pooling intermediary on its three provisional tax dates. The tax pooling intermediary deposits each payment into its tax pooling account at IRD. The taxpayer's deposits are date-stamped and recorded in the intermediary's tax pool registry. The taxpayer can use the deposits held in the pool on its behalf to settle their income tax liabilities once it has finalised its income tax return. Funds remain in the intermediary's tax pool account at IRD until instruction is received from the taxpayer to transfer the deposits into the taxpayer's own IRD account. Once processed by IRD, the taxpayer's IRD statement will show the tax pool transfers at the original date of the deposit, satisfying the taxpayer's liability.

Tax sale/purchase

A depositing taxpayer who has excess tax remaining once it has transferred what it needs from the tax pool to satisfy its own liability can earn a higher rate of interest on their overpayment than it would receive from IRD by selling the surplus tax it has at each of its provisional tax dates to another taxpayer who has underpaid at those dates. The underpayer can reduce the interest payable on its underpaid income tax when it purchases this surplus tax to meet its own liability.

A taxpayer may also purchase other types of tax (including income tax, GST, FBT and PAYE) if it has received a notice of reassessment from IRD due to a voluntary disclosure or audit.

Tax swap

A depositing taxpayer who has overpaid at one provisional tax date and underpaid at another can swap tax between these dates (or with another depositing taxpayer) to even out payments to either increase or reduce the amount of interest payable or receivable. A tax swap is a combination of a tax sale and a tax purchase.

Tax finance

This arrangement allows a taxpayer to pay an upcoming instalment of provisional tax at a date in the future that suits them. The taxpayer pays an upfront finance fee and a tax pooling intermediary makes a date-stamped deposit equal to the amount financed into its tax pool account on behalf of the taxpayer on the provisional tax date. The taxpayer then pays the intermediary at the agreed upon date in the future and the intermediary arranges the tax deposit to be transferred from its tax pool to the taxpayer's IRD account.

Tax finance became popular in 2009 when businesses were experiencing cashflow constraints and looking at other sources of working capital.

== Legislative changes ==
In 2003, the government changed the rules so that businesses would receive imputation credits when they deposit money into a tax pooling account.

A number of amendments were made to tax pooling legislation in 2009 and 2011 following a review of the rules. These include:

- Extending tax pooling to reassessments, including those that arise as a result of a voluntary disclosure or the resolution of a dispute.
- Extending tax pooling to voluntary disclosures for some non-income tax payments (GST, PAYE or FBT) where no previous assessment has been made.
- Allowing the Commissioner of IRD to provide discretion to allow the use of tax pooling for certain income tax or RWT voluntary disclosures where no return had previously been filed.
- Enabling funds held in tax pool accounts to be transferred between tax pooling intermediaries.
- Allowing all taxpayers to make deposits into tax pooling accounts.
- Extending the time limit available to use purchased tax pool funds to settle provisional and terminal tax liabilities for the current tax year or one just completed to 75 days past terminal tax date.
- Removing this time limit for meeting provisional or terminal tax obligations when taxpayers use their own deposited funds, provided the return was filed on time.

In 2014, the government announced its intention to introduce legislation that would allow taxpayers to use tax pool funds to meet accrued IRD interest and core tax obligations. Under previous rules, funds could only be used against core tax. The legislation was passed in 2016.

In 2016, IRD issued a discussion document explaining proposed changes to the New Zealand provisional tax system. The document stated that while the new safe harbour threshold would reduce the impact of use of money interest on taxpayers, they could continue to using tax pooling to make their payments.

== Tax pooling today ==
There are six registered tax pooling intermediaries approved by, and registered with, IRD. Five of these operate as companies. In 2014, an independent review of tax pooling rules carried out via PwC found that the system is operating efficiently and is valued by taxpayers.
