= Valabh Committee =

The Valabh Committee, named after its Chair Arthur Valabh, was a New Zealand government appointed committee tasked with reviewing various aspects of the income tax system in the late 1980s and early 1990s.

Although originally convened to review proposals for a capital gains tax, the Committee ended up making a number of recommendations for fundamental reform of the scheme and structure of the New Zealand tax legislation, most of which were implemented.

The committee had a lasting impact on the direction of tax reform, including the style and drafting of the income tax legislation, as well as numerous specific recommendations for the tax treatment of, for example, depreciation and partnerships.

== Committee members ==
The formal name of the Valabh Committee was the “Consultative Committee on the Taxation of Income from Capital”. The Committee comprised:

- Arthur Valabh, OBE (chair)
- Dr Robin Congreve
- Lindsay McKay
- Rob McLeod
- Tim Robinson

It was supported by a secretary (Greg Cole) as well as by officials from both the Inland Revenue Department and the Treasury.

== Background ==
The 1980s were a period of considerable economic and tax reform in New Zealand. New Zealand had never had a formal capital gains tax system (unlike virtually every other OECD nation. The government was considering implementing a capital gains tax and issued a consultative document as part of the (then) process of tax reform.

The Committee appointed to review submissions, in response to the Consultative Document, instead reported to government that it did not consider the state of the tax system at that time sufficiently robust enough to support additional reform of this nature. The government accepted this recommendation and re-tasked the committee to advise it on the structural reforms required.

== Key proposals ==
The Committee subsequently published 5 discussion papers:

- The Core Provisions of the Income Tax Act 1976 (Core Provisions Paper)
- The Taxation of Distributions from Companies (Company Distribution Paper)
- Tax Accounting Issues
- Key Reforms to the Scheme of Tax Legislation (Key Reforms Paper)
- Operational Aspects of the Accrual Rules

In addition the Committee separately reported to government on the reform of the tax depreciation rules.

=== Core provisions and scheme ===
The thrust of the Core Provisions and Key Reforms Papers was to ensure that the income tax legislation was appropriately structured and ordered to facilitate the understanding of the rules as well as to allow for further reform to be implemented effectively.

This work led directly to the Working Party on the Reorganisation of the Income Tax Act 1976 and the complete rewrite of the legislation.

=== Company taxation and dividends ===
The proposals made in the Company Distribution Paper led to a revised definition of what constituted a dividend under New Zealand tax law as well as the introduction of a small company taxation regime (“qualifying company” regime).

=== Depreciation ===
The committee's recommendations resulted in a new tax depreciation regime introduced in 1993.

=== Interest deductibility ===
The government accepted the committee's recommendation for a significantly more liberal regime for the deduction of interest for tax purposes.

=== Partnerships ===
Recommendations for the reform of the tax treatment of partnerships was finally implemented by government in 2007
