= Tax Working Group =

The Tax Working Group was an advisory body that was created by the New Zealand Government in late 2017 to investigate ways of reforming New Zealand's taxation system and making it "fairer." Some key areas under its purview included the Goods and Services Tax and alleviating the housing market. The Working Group was headed by former Finance Minister Sir Michael Cullen.

== Mandate and functions ==
The Tax Working Group was established on 20 December 2017 with the stated goal of "[examining] further improvements in the structure, fairness and balance of the tax system." The Working Group reported to the New Zealand Government on the following matters:

- Whether the tax system operates fairly in relation to taxpayers, income, assets and wealth.
- Whether the tax system promotes the right balance between supporting the productive economy and the speculative economy.
- Whether there are changes to the tax system which would make it more fair, balanced and efficient.
- Whether there are other changes which would support the integrity of the income tax system, having regard to the interaction of the systems for taxing companies, trusts, and individuals.

The Tax Working Group's responsibilities included:

- Forecasting the economic environment for the next 5–10 years; taking into account demographic changes, changes in technology and employment practices, and their impact on business models.
- Investigating whether a system of capital gains taxation or land taxation (excluding the family home or the land under it), or other housing tax measures would improve the taxation system
- Investigating whether a progressive company tax (with a lower rate for small companies) would improve the taxation system and the business environment
- Investigating what role the taxation system can play in delivering positive environmental and ecological outcomes over the longer term.

Areas outside the purview of the Working Group included: increasing any income tax or the GST rate; inheritance tax; the taxation of the family home or the land under it; the adequacy of the personal tax system and its interaction with the transfer system; and technical matters such as international tax reform under the base erosion and profit shifting agenda and policy chances as part of the Inland Revenue Department's Business Transformation programme.

== History ==
=== Formation and membership ===
Following the formation of a new Labour-led coalition government in the weeks after the 2017 general election, Prime Minister Jacinda Ardern announced that the incoming government would establish a Tax Working Group under its 100-day plan. On 23 November, it was announced that former Finance Minister Sir Michael Cullen would be heading the Working Group. While the Tax Working Group would have a mandate over New Zealand's taxation system, it was directed to look at specific areas including the Goods and Services Tax and alleviating the housing market. While the Working Group would not have the power to change the GST rate, it would be able to advise on removing or adding GST to certain goods such as female hygiene products, fruits, vegetables, and "basic food items."

On 20 December, the New Zealand Government announced that the Tax Working Group would consist of a mixture of individuals from various backgrounds including academics, tax experts, and people with private sector, union, and Māori community experiences. In addition to its Chair Sir Michael Cullen, other Working Group members would include:

- Professor Craig Elliffe, University of Auckland
- Joanne Hodge, former tax partner at Bell Gully
- Kirk Hope, Chief Executive of Business New Zealand
- Nick Malarao, senior partner at Meredith Connell
- Geof Nightingale, partner at PwC New Zealand
- Robin Oliver, former Deputy Commissioner at Inland Revenue
- Hinerangi Raumati, Chair of Parininihi ki Waitotara Inc
- Michelle Redington, Head of Group Taxation and Insurance at Air New Zealand
- Bill Rosenberg, Economist and Director of Policy at the Council of Trade Unions
- Marjan Van Den Belt, Assistant Vice Chancellor (Sustainability) at Victoria University of Wellington

The Tax Working Group held its first meeting at the end of January 2018.

=== Proposed capital gains tax ===
In mid-February 2019, the Tax Working Group recommended that the New Zealand Government implement a capital gains tax (CGT) and use the revenue generated to lower the personal tax rate and to target polluters. This proposed capital gains tax would cover assets such as land, shares, investment properties, business assets and intellectual property. It proposed setting a tax rate of 33% at the income-earner's top rate level. The Tax Working Group also proposed raising social welfare net benefits to allow low-incomer earners to cope with to post-tax threshold adjustments. However, other assets such as family homes, cars, boats and art would be exempt from the CGT. Tax Working Group Chairman Cullen claimed that the capital gains tax would raise NZ$8.3 billion over the next five years.

Finance Minister Grant Robertson and Revenue Minister Stuart Nash welcomed the Tax Working Group's recommendations. Robertson said that the Labour Party would seek to build a consensus with its coalition partners New Zealand First and the Greens. Nash also praised the Tax Working Group for identifying weaknesses in the country's taxation system and said that the report presented the government with options on tackling it. Government spokespersons also said that they would study the report and inform the public if they were introducing a capital gains tax by April 2019.

Opposition Leader Simon Bridges of the National Party criticized the proposed capital gains tax as an assault on the "Kiwi way of life" and vowed to fight it every step of the way. Similarly, National's Finance spokesperson Amy Adams claimed that the Tax Working Group was proposing a massive tax grab that would hurt the New Zealand economy and taxpayers. Businesses, landlords, and farmers have objected to the proposed tax while trade unions including the New Zealand Council of Trade Unions and environmental groups have expressed support for the proposed CGT.

On 17 April, the Coalition government announced that it would not be introducing a capital gains tax. Members of the ruling coalition were unable to reach a consensus on the issue. Bridges criticized the capital gains tax debate for wasting taxpayer funds and weakening the New Zealand economy by undermining business confidence.
