= Renshaw Edwards =

Disgraced law firm from New Zealand

- Headquarters: Upper Hutt, New Zealand
- Key people: Patrick John Renshaw; Keith Edwards

Renshaw Edwards was a disgraced law firm consisting of Patrick John Renshaw and Keith Edwards that operated from Upper Hutt, New Zealand. Renshaw and Edwards were exposed in 1992 for committing New Zealand's largest fraud by a law firm. In a bizarre situation, unbeknown to each other, not one, but both of the law partners were stealing money from the same firm. Millions of dollars of gambling with the TAB was blamed for the fraud.

== Aftermath ==
The New Zealand Law Society Fidelity Fund, which was legally liable for the losses, found the losses so high that they had to take the unprecedented step of imposing a special levy of NZ$10,000 on its 2,800 senior solicitors to reimburse the $29 million paid to the 400+ victims of the fraud.

Renshaw was later sentenced to 7 years on 42 charges, and Edwards was sentenced to 6 years on 51 charges. Both, however, were released from prison after serving less than 3 years.

The fraud also led to many other lawsuits against the Law Society, other law firms, and even the TAB.

In October 2015, Patrick John Renshaw, 68, tax advisor of Lower Hutt, again appeared before the courts and pleaded guilty to 42 charges of aiding and abetting offences, most of them for not paying PAYE tax deductions for employees of his own company. He was given home detention for tax fraud of nearly $347,000. Other charges included attempting to claim false GST refunds for four companies, and filing a false income tax return for himself and one company between January 2010 and November 2012. Inland Revenue reported that the shortfall was $144,968.20 in tax paid, and another $201,413.19 tax fraud attempted.
