= Working Party on the Reorganisation of the Income Tax Act 1976 =

The Working Party on the Reorganisation of the Income Tax Act 1976 was a committee appointed by the New Zealand government to advise on the appropriate reorganisation of the income tax legislation. The Working Party was set up in 1993 as a result of recommendations made by the Valabh Committee set up to review the overall income tax system. The Working Party comprised Arthur Valabh (Chair), Dame Margaret Bazley, and Sir Kenneth Keith.

The Working Party issued two reports on the reorganisation of the then Income Tax Act 1976. Following on from these reports the government in 1995 established a review process for rewriting the income tax legislation, overseen by an advisory panel drawn from the private and public sectors.

The Income Tax Act has since been largely rewritten in a plain English style with a radically re-organised structure, including a unique (for New Zealand) alpha-numeric section referencing system (as opposed to the more usual numeric system. It was re-enacted as the Income Tax Act 1994 and again as the Income Tax Act 2007 as the various parts of the legislation was progressively rewritten.

The Rewrite Advisory Panel was established initially to oversee the rewrite process, but from 2004 it was also tasked with determining whether there are errors (or "unintended legislative changes") in the rewriting of the Income Tax Acts. The Panel was disestablished in 2014. Its chairs were Colin Blair (1995–2003), Sir Ivor Richardson (2003–08) and David McLay (2008–14).
