= Pūao-te-Āta-tū =

New Zealand report

Pūao-te-Āta-tū (Māori: "daybreak") was the title of a 1986 report published by the Ministerial Advisory Committee on a Māori Perspective for the Department of Social Welfare in New Zealand.

== Contents ==
It was a detailed commentary and enquiry into racism within New Zealand society, and in particular within the Department of Social Welfare.

The document contains a detailed account of New Zealand's history focusing on the interactions between the indigenous Māori people and the British settlers. It points out in detail the harm done to the Māori people and culture and the effects this has had on the wellbeing and socio-economic status of Māori people. 13 recommendations were given in regard to becoming an anti-racist society and achieving social equality for the Māori people.
