= Child support (New Zealand) =

Child support in New Zealand is regulated by the Child Support Act 1991 and is managed by the Child Support unit of Inland Revenue.

== Amount of Child support ==
There are 3 methods for calculating the level of child support a liable parent, and they are: 1. Order of the Family Court 2. Voluntary agreement 3. Inland Revenue calculation

=== Order of the Family Court ===
Subject to certain limitations, the IRD can enforce a child support order made by the Family Court.

=== Voluntary agreement ===
Subject to certain limitations, both parents can agree to a voluntary agreement, and register the agreement with the IRD for enforcement.

=== Inland Revenue Calculation ===
By far, the most common, and most contentious method, is the IRD making a calculation for the amount of child support that a liable parent is required to pay in child support.

The calculation takes into account the liable parent’s income for the previous year, their current living arrangements, and how many children the custodial parent has, although there are many departures to these rules.

== Calculation of Liable Parents Income ==
The annual income used for child support, is generally the income from the previous tax year, i.e. the year to 31 March, although the IRD make in February an estimate of the first 6 months due to the fact that tax returns are not later filed until July, and these estimates are later readjusted in August after the tax return has been filed.

However, under certain circumstances the Liable Parent can use an estimate of their income for the year. Furthermore, self-employed people can use their taxable income from not the previous tax year, but the tax year before.

== Calculation of Liable Parents Living Allowance ==
The IRD gives the Liable Parent a living allowance, for which no child support is payable and it varies depending on whether the Liable Parent has a spouse or dependent children. However, if the liable parent has higher living expenses than normal, then they can apply for an Administrative Review to increase their living allowance.

=== IRD Living allowances from 1 April 2013 to 31 March 2014 ===
Single person with no dependents - $14,960.00 Married or with a civil union or de facto partner and with no dependent children - $20,343.00 Single, married or with a civil union or de facto partner, with one child living with the paying parent - $28,734.00 Single, married or with a civil union or de facto partner, with two children living with the paying parent - $31,743.00 Single, married or with a civil union or de facto partner, with three children living with the paying parent - $34,753.00 Single, married or with a civil union or de facto partner, with four or more children living with the paying parent - $37,762.00

== Calculating the Child Support income percentage ==
The percentage rate the IRD use depends on the number of children for whom the paying parent must pay child support. The list below shows the percentages where the paying parent is not in a shared care arrangement for child support purposes:

- one child 18%
- two children 24%
- three children 27%
- four or more children 30%.

== Example ==
For example, a Liable Parent, living alone with no dependent children, earning $40,000, with 2 children with the custodial parent would pay the following in child support:

$40,000 (gross income) minus $14,960 (living allowance) equals $25,040 $25,040 then multiplied by 24% (for 2 children) = annual child support of $6,009.60 which then divided by 12 =$500.80 per month in child support.

== Minimum Child support ==
There is a minimum amount of child support to pay, unless the liable parent is exempt, which is currently $91.60 per month in 2023. This amount changes each financial year in line with inflation.

== Liable Parents exempt from Child Support ==
Amongst the very few exemptions for Liable Parents to pay child support are long term hospital patients and prison inmates, of 13 weeks or more, as well as Liable Parents while they are aged 16 years or younger, are exempt from paying child support.

== Administrative Review ==
Either parent can apply for a reassessment for a different amount in child support, which is referred to as an Administrative Review.

An administrative review is based on the Family Court departure order process. Child Support staff organise the review process, but the actual review is done by an independent person, called the review officer, who is contracted to Inland Revenue.

In deciding whether to change an assessment, the review officer must consider:

- the special circumstances
- whether a change would be fair to both parties and the children
- if a change would be otherwise appropriate.

When you apply for an administrative review, you will be asked to provide details of your financial situation. If the other parent wants to take part in the review:

- they are allowed to have a copy of your application and any supporting information, including the financial details
- you are allowed to have a copy of their response and supporting information.

This swapping of information is done:

- so both people know all the information the review officer will be considering, and
- so each can respond to the other's details.

== Grounds for an Administrative Review ==
There are 11 grounds for an Administrative Review, which are as follows:

- You have a duty to maintain another child or person.
- It costs extra to cover the special needs of another child or person you have a duty to maintain.
- You have necessary expenses in supporting yourself.
- You have necessary expenses in supporting another child or person you have a duty to maintain.
- It costs more than 5% of the child support income amount to enable the paying parent to have contact with the child.
- It costs you extra to cover the child's special needs.
- It costs you extra to care for, educate or train the child in the way that was expected by either parent.
- The child support assessment does not take into account the income, earning capacity, property or financial resources of either parent or the child.
- You are the paying parent and the assessment does not take into account that you have previously made payments, transfers or property settlements for the benefit of the child.
- You are the paying parent and you still have a financial interest in a property that the custodian is entitled to live in.

So for instance if the Liable Parent had the high cost of paying $100 per week for a car loan, they would generally be denied a reassessment of their living expenses. However, if the Liable Parent applied for a reassessment for the car loan as the car was required to get to work, it is likely to be accepted.

- where one person may incur significant costs in re-establishing themselves

== Child Support Arrears ==
If the Liable parent gets in arrears in their child support payments, the IRD will make the Liable parents employer deduct the arrears from their pay, up to the maximum of 40% of their pay, as the rest is referred to as Protected Earnings. Other powers the IRD have is to deduct money from the Liable parent’s bank account, as well as transfer any tax refund that they may be normally entitled to. Unlike some countries, the New Zealand child support regime has no penalty of imprisonment for arrears. However it is arguable that the IRD has the power to arrest a Liable Parent in arrears at the airport, but as this is so problematic with complying with the law, it is never done. Not that this stops the IRD from threatening to do so.

== Penalties ==
Like other overdue tax penalties, the IRD has a harsh penalty regime of adding 2% immediately when it falls due, with another 8% added 7 days later if it still not paid. Thereafter, a penalty of 2% is charged every month for the first 12 months, then reducing to 1% per month thereafter.

This has resulted in a self-perpetuating cycle of the IRD largely chasing up arrears that are just penalties. For instance, as at 31 March 2012, of a combined total IRD child support debt arrears of $2,305 million, 72% of this was the $1,668 million worth of unpaid penalties.

The IRD now has greater flexibility in waiving such penalties, especially where the Liable parent enters into a repayment plan to pay off the arrears.

Interestingly enough, the Child Support Penalties are not forwarded on to the Custodial parent, but are instead retained by the IRD.

== Reciprocity agreement with Australia ==
Since only as recently as 2000, New Zealand has a reciprocity agreement with Australia whether the Australian Taxation Office collects child support for NZ residents from Liable Parents in Australia. While they also collect child support arrears, they only pursue the last 2 years of arrears.

== The Child Support Amendment Act [2013] ==
The Child Support Amendment Act [2013] was to come into effect on 1 April 2014, however as the proposed changes have been so problematic for the IRD to implement, these changes were delayed until 1 April 2015. When the law change comes into effect, it significant changes to the way child support is calculated in New Zealand. The major changes include:

- increasing the minimum weekly child support from $15 per week to $35 per week, which will be annually adjusted for inflation
- removing from the living allowance an increase for a partner, or for children of the partner that are not the children of the liable parent.
- take both parents income into account for the assessment
- making employers make compulsory child support deductions from liable parents wages
- now includes non taxable income as assessable income
- Gives the IRD more discretion to waive child support penalties
