= Absentee Tax =

Absentee Tax was a tax charged in the early 1900s to those individuals who held property in New Zealand but were not resident in that country and had moved out of it. A similar tax was introduced in New Zealand in 2008.

== In Ireland ==
Absentee Tax was first imposed in Ireland in 1715. There were too many exceptions in the Act and hence it lapsed in 1753. The logic behind the tax was the loss of revenue due to absenteeism. In 1868 Thorold Rogers proposed the trebling of Income tax for absentee land owners which was later rejected.

== In New Zealand ==
In 1904 the tax was charged at half decimal point.

In New Zealand it was feared that the tax might discourage the migration of the people to the colonies.

In 2008 two new acts were passed, the Limited Partnership Act 2008 (No 1 of 2008) and the Taxation (Limited Partnerships) Act 2008. The amendments to the Income tax Act 2007 included Section HD20 which states that the person is called an agent if they carry business on behalf of an absentee, and Section HD 20B that states that the partner is liable for the tax liability of an absentee limited partner.
