= Inland Revenue Department (New Zealand) =

New Zealand government

Inland Revenue
- Te Tari Taake (Māori)

Agency overview
- Formed: 1878
- Preceding agency: Land and Income Tax Department
- Jurisdiction: New Zealand
- Headquarters: 55 Featherston Street, Wellington 6012
- Employees: 4,637
- Annual budget: Total actual expenses for 2024/25; Vote Revenue ▲$752,267,000
- Minister responsible: Hon Simon Watts, Minister of Revenue
- Agency executive: Peter Mersi, Chief Executive and Commissioner
- Website: www.ird.govt.nz

Inland Revenue (formerly Inland Revenue Department - IRD; Māori: Te Tari Taake) is the public service department of New Zealand charged with advising the government on tax policy, collecting and disbursing payments for social support programmes, and collecting tax.

== History ==
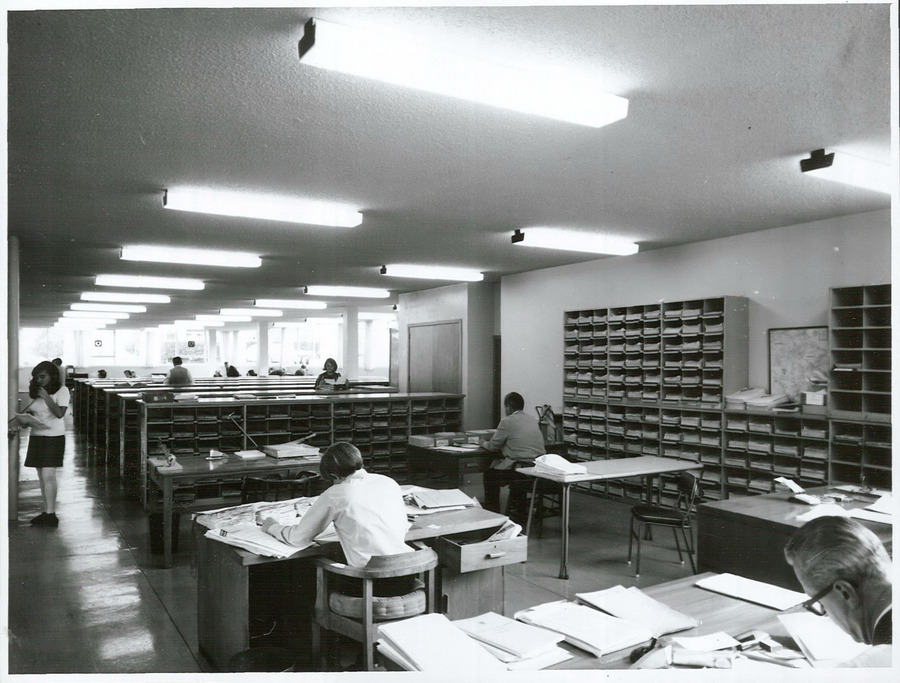
Inland Revenue Department offices in Takapuna, Auckland in 1967

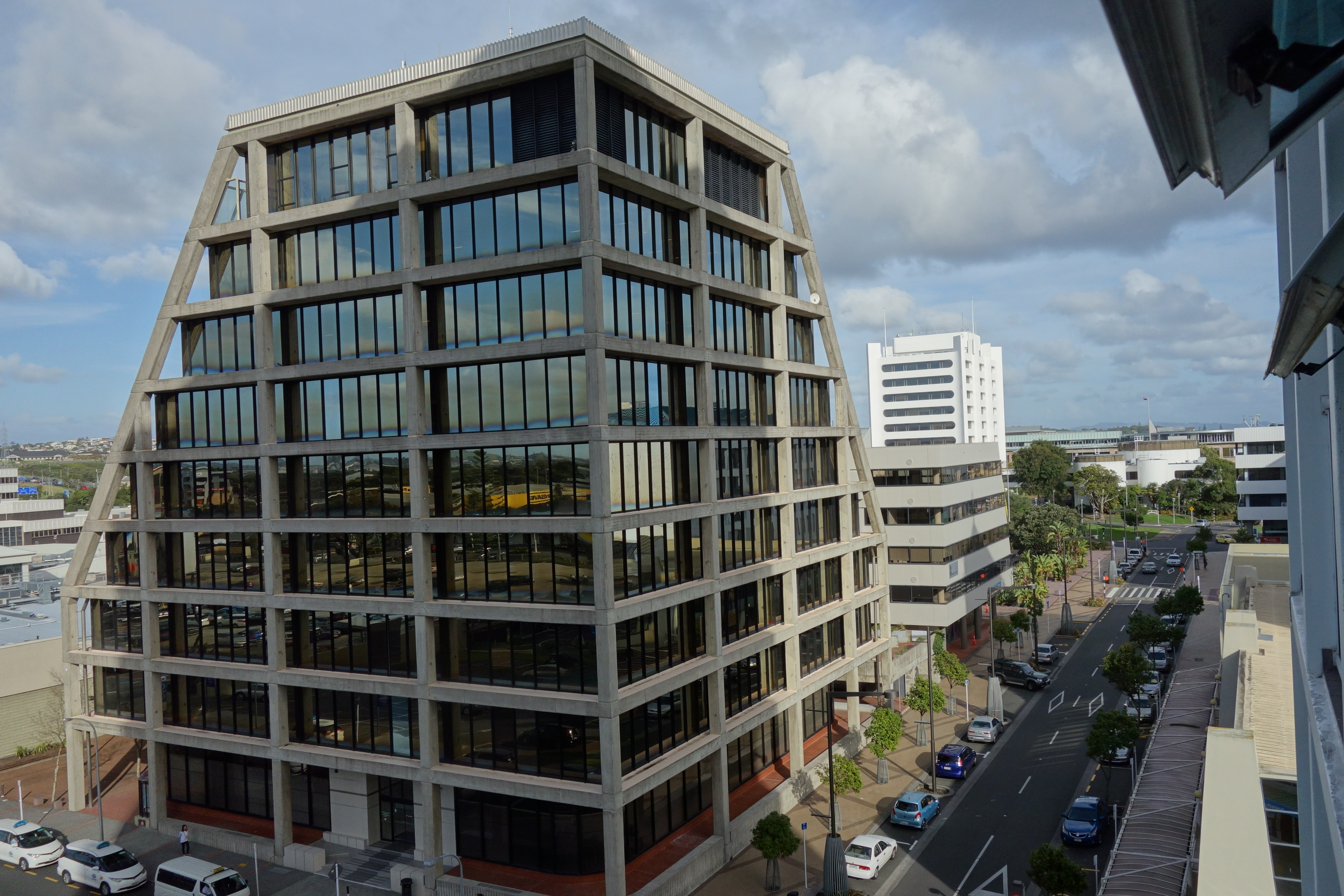
The IRD Building in Manukau City Centre, Auckland

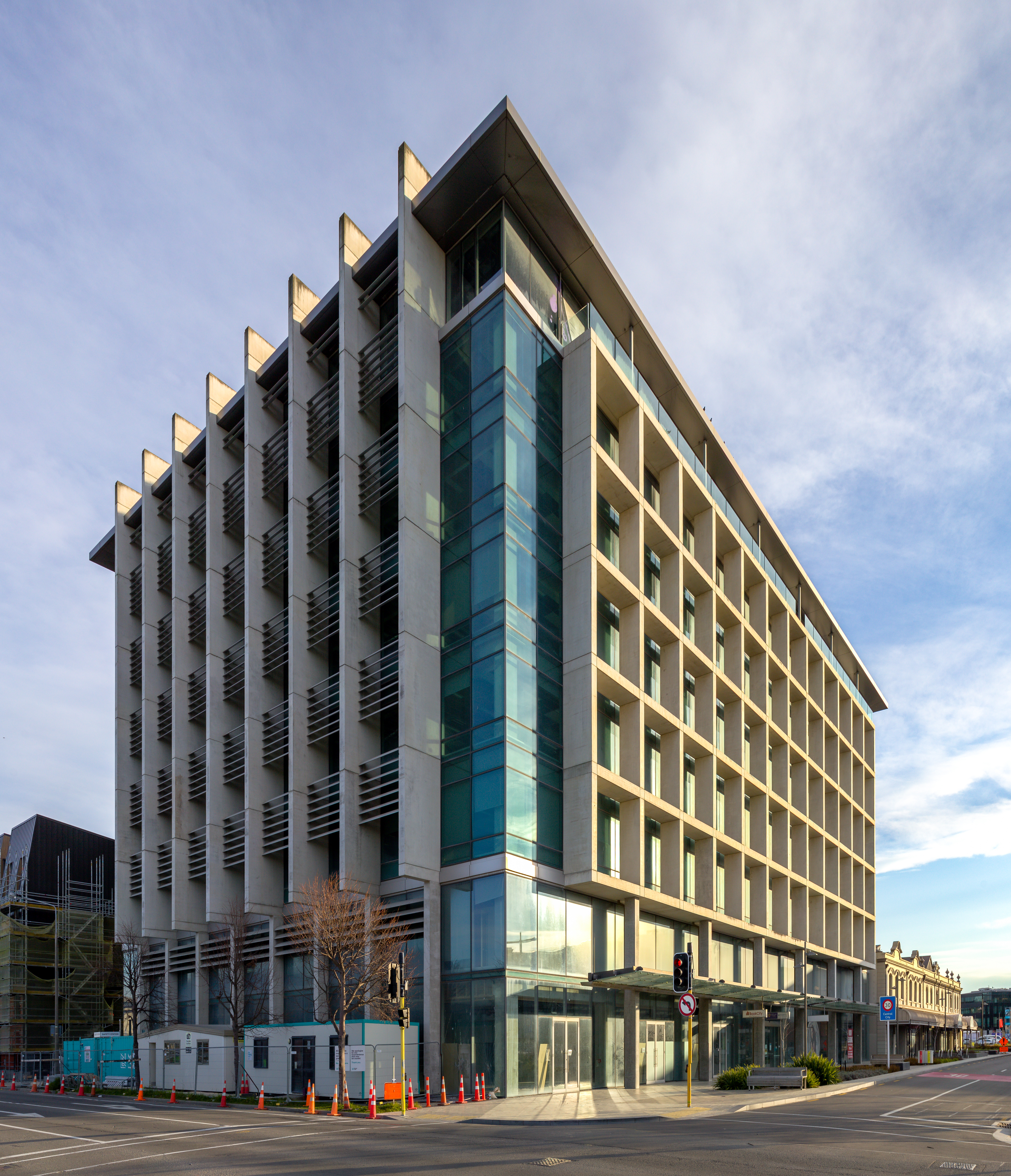
The IRD Building in Christchurch

Inland Revenue started out as the Land Tax Department in 1878. The department was renamed the Land and Income Tax Department in 1892 with the central office set up in Wellington.

Only in 1952, when the organisation joined with the Stamp Duties Department, was the organisation known as the Inland Revenue Department.

In 1995, a Rewrite Advisory Panel was established to consider and advise on issues arising during the rewriting of the income tax legislation, as part of New Zealand tax reform arising from the Working Party on the Reorganisation of the Income Tax Act 1976. The panel was disestablished in 2014 at the completion of the tax reform.

Inland Revenue's Māori name, Te Tari Taake, means 'The Department of Tax'. Despite long vowels in Māori now being most commonly expressed with macrons over the vowel rather than double vowels, the department continues to use the double vowel due to the resemblance of the word tāke to the English word take.

== Service delivery ==
In 2021–22, Inland Revenue collected $100.6 billion in tax revenue, which helped pay for the services that all New Zealanders benefit from such as social security and welfare, health and education. Other services included law and order, housing and community development, environmental protection, defence, transport, and heritage, culture and recreation.

In recent years, Inland Revenue has undergone business transformation activities aimed at simplifying the tax and social benefits process of receiving and paying taxes. As of 2019, these changes have resulted in a reduction of $60 million in administrative costs and an increase of $90 million in additional revenue through compliance and reduced effort for small to medium-sized businesses. In 2021, further business transformation activities were undertaken, including an upgrade to myIR, their secure online service, which has made it easier for customers to manage their tax and payments online.

In 2020, Inland Revenue delivered a change to the revenue system for individuals where every taxpayer account for income tax, Working for Families, KiwiSaver, student loans and the end-to-end processing of PAYE moved into Inland Revenue’s new tax and revenue technology system.

The department administers the following social support programmes:

- Working for Families (tax credits)
- Paid Parental Leave (payment)
- Child Support (collection and payment)
- Student Loan debt (collection)
- KiwiSaver

=== Acts and regulations administered ===
Legislation administered by Inland Revenue includes:

- Cheque Duty Repeal Act 2014
- Child Support Act 1991
- Estate and Gift Duties Act 1968
- Gaming Duties Act 1971
- Goods and Services Tax Act 1985
- Income Tax Act 2007
- Stamp and Cheque Duties Act 1971
- Student Loan Scheme Act 2011
- Tax Administration Act 1994
- Taxation Review Authorities Act 1994
- Unclaimed Money Act 1971
- KiwiSaver Act 2006

== Criticisms ==
=== Debt collection ===
Inland Revenue has been criticised for what are seen as heavy handed tactics when forcing payment from debtors, specifically those owing tax arrears and child support payments, and for charging excessive penalties on debts which result in debtors falling into a cycle whereby they are unable to pay the growing amounts they owe. The approach of Inland Revenue has been implicated in a number of suicides and other acts of self-harm.

The number of people threatening self-harm in phone calls to Inland Revenue has trended down consistently over the last three years. Between January and August 2019, 168 people contacted Inland Revenue threatening self-harm. That compares to 292 for the 2018 calendar year; 306 for 2017; and 334 for 2016.

=== Copyright violations ===
In mid-December 2025, the business journal National Business Review (NBR) banned Inland Revenue from taking out any subscriptions after the government department breached NBR's copyright by sharing 22 paywalled articles among several staff members. While Inland Revenue had a group subscription for 220 staff members until March 2024, this had been replaced by a single subscription for a member of its media team. NBR's co-owner Todd Scott confirmed that the journal had adopted a policy of pursuing subscribers for copyright violations of its content. In response, Inland Revenue had offered to pay NBR the sum of NZ$12,500 including GST in redress. NBR regarded the offer as insufficient and proposed a counter-offer, which Inland Revenue declined to pay. In January 2026, National Business Review confirmed that it would pursue legal action against Inland Revenue through the District Court in order to recover the costs of a full group subscription, which NBR co-editor Hamish McNichol estimated to be worth NZ$36,000 plus GST.

== Awards ==
- At the 2022 Public Service Day Awards, two Inland Revenue employees (one posthumously) received the Public Service Commissioner's Commendation for Excellence award for their outstanding spirit of service.
- In 2021, Inland Revenue were finalists at the Spirit of Service Awards for service excellence for their work investing in new technology and tools, focusing on simplifying policies and processes and introducing new ways of working to deliver better experiences for customers.
- In November 2019, an Inland Revenue employee was awarded the State Services Commissioner's Commendation for Frontline Excellence for her investigation into the suspected multimillion-dollar income suppression by a chain of restaurants. This investigation led to one of the most significant prosecution cases undertaken by Inland Revenue in the past decade.
- In 2019 Inland Revenue was awarded a Distinguished Service Award from Multicultural New Zealand in recognition of its support of community members in the aftermath of the Christchurch attacks.
- Inland Revenue, along with The Treasury, were finalists at the Spirit of Service Awards 2019 for their partnership work to enhance tax policy through kaitiakitanga (stewardship), manaakitanga (care), ōhanga (prosperity) and whanaungatanga (relationships).
- In 2019, an Inland Revenue employee was awarded the Ria McBride Public Service Management Award, sponsored by Te Kawa Mataaho Public Service Commission, which supports women to study as part of their development towards senior management positions in the Public Service.
- In 2018, the IPANZ Prime Minister's Award for Public Sector Excellence and Achieving Collective Impact was awarded to the Ministry of Education, Tertiary Education Commission, Ministry of Social Development and Inland Revenue for delivering fees-free tertiary education for the 2018 school year. The Regulatory Systems award went to the Ministry of Justice, Department of Internal Affairs, Reserve Bank of New Zealand, Financial Markets Authority, New Zealand Customs, and Inland Revenue for Anti-Money Laundering and Countering Financing Terrorism.
- At the 2018 New Zealand CIO Awards, Inland Revenue were finalists in the Business Transformation through Digital and ICT category.

== List of ministers ==
The Minister of Revenue is the political office of minister for the department of Inland Revenue. Since November 2023, the position has been held by Simon Watts.

Key

Liberal Reform United Labour National United United Future

No.	Name	Portrait	Term of office		Prime Minister
As Minister in Charge of Land and Income Tax Department
1	Arthur Myers		28 March 1912	10 July 1912	Mackenzie
2	James Allen		10 July 1912	12 August 1915	Massey
3	Joseph Ward		12 August 1915	21 August 1919	Massey
(2)	James Allen		4 September 1919	28 April 1920	Massey
4	William Massey		12 May 1920†	10 May 1925	Massey
5	William Nosworthy		14 May 1925	24 May 1926	Bell
5	William Nosworthy		14 May 1925	24 May 1926	Coates
6	William Downie Stewart Jr		24 May 1926	10 December 1928	Coates
(3)	Joseph Ward		10 December 1928	28 May 1930	Ward
7	George Forbes		28 May 1930	22 September 1931	Forbes
(6)	William Downie Stewart Jr		22 September 1931	28 January 1933	Forbes
8	Gordon Coates		28 January 1933	6 December 1935	Forbes
9	Walter Nash		6 December 1935	13 December 1949	Savage
9	Walter Nash		6 December 1935	13 December 1949	Fraser
10	Charles Bowden		13 December 1949	1 November 1952	Holland
As Minister in Charge of the Inland Revenue Department
(10)	Charles Bowden		1 November 1952	26 November 1954	Holland
11	Jack Watts		26 November 1954	12 December 1957	Holland
11	Jack Watts		26 November 1954	12 December 1957	Holyoake
12	Arnold Nordmeyer		12 December 1957	12 December 1960	Nash
13	Harry Lake		12 December 1960	20 December 1963†	Holyoake
Office not in use
14	Peter Wilkinson		12 December 1975	8 March 1977	Muldoon
15	Hugh Templeton		8 March 1977	11 December 1981	Muldoon
16	John Falloon		11 December 1981	26 July 1984	Muldoon
17	Roger Douglas		26 July 1984	24 August 1987	Lange
As Minister of Revenue
18	Trevor de Cleene		24 August 1987	15 December 1988	Lange
19	David Caygill		15 December 1988	9 February 1990	Lange
19	David Caygill		15 December 1988	9 February 1990	Palmer
20	Peter Neilson		9 February 1990	2 November 1990	Palmer
20	Peter Neilson		9 February 1990	2 November 1990	Moore
21	Wyatt Creech		2 November 1990	29 February 1996	Bolger
22	Peter Dunne		29 February 1996	16 December 1996	Bolger
23	Bill Birch		16 December 1996	31 August 1998	Bolger
23	Bill Birch		16 December 1996	31 August 1998	Shipley
24	Max Bradford		31 August 1998	1 February 1999	Shipley
25	Bill English		1 February 1999	22 June 1999	Shipley
(23)	Bill Birch		22 June 1999	10 December 1999	Shipley
26	Michael Cullen		10 December 1999	17 October 2005	Clark
(22)	Peter Dunne		17 October 2005	7 June 2013	Clark
(22)	Peter Dunne		17 October 2005	7 June 2013	Key
27	Todd McClay		7 June 2013	14 December 2015	Key
28	Michael Woodhouse		14 December 2015	20 December 2016	Key
29	Judith Collins		20 December 2016	26 October 2017	English
30	Stuart Nash		26 October 2017	6 November 2020	Ardern
31	David Parker		6 November 2020	24 July 2023	Ardern
31	David Parker		6 November 2020	24 July 2023	Hipkins
32	Barbara Edmonds		24 July 2023	27 November 2023	Hipkins
33	Simon Watts		27 November 2023	Incumbent	Luxon

== See also ==
- Taxation in New Zealand
