= Goods and Services Tax (New Zealand) =

New Zealand tax

Goods and Services Tax (GST; Māori: Tāke hokohoko) is a value-added tax or consumption tax for goods and services consumed in New Zealand.

GST in New Zealand is designed to be a broad-based system with few exemptions, such as for rents collected on residential rental properties, donations, precious metals and financial services. It normally makes up around 30% of tax revenue in New Zealand.

The rate for GST, effective since 1 October 2010 is 15%. This 15% tax is applied to the final price of the product or service being purchased and goods and services are advertised as GST inclusive. Reduced rate GST (9%) applies to hotel accommodation on a long-term basis (longer than 4 weeks). Zero rate GST (0%) applies to exports and related services; land transactions; international transportation. Financial services, real estate and precious metals are also exempt.

== History ==
GST was introduced on 1 October 1986 by the Minister of Finance, Roger Douglas, at a rate of 10% on goods and services, during a series of controversial economic reforms undertaken by the Fourth Labour Government known as Rogernomics. It was introduced in conjunction with compensating changes to personal income tax rates and removal of many excise taxes on imported goods. It replaced existing sales taxes for goods and services. In 1989, GST was increased to 12.5%, near the end of the Fourth Labour Government. In 2010, GST was raised again by the Fifth National Government, taking GST to 15%.

== Operation ==
GST-registered organisations and individuals pay GST only on the difference between GST-liable sales and GST-liable supplies (i.e., they pay GST on the difference between what they sell and what they buy: income less expenditure). This is accomplished by reconciling GST received (through sales) and GST paid (through purchases) at regular periods (typically every two months, with some qualifying companies opting for one-month or six-month periods), then either paying the difference to the Inland Revenue Department (IRD) if the GST collected on sales is higher or receiving a refund from IRD if the GST paid on purchases is higher.

Businesses exporting goods and services from New Zealand are entitled to "zero-rate" such products: effectively, they charge GST at 0%. This permits the business to claim back the input GST, but the eventual, non-New Zealand based consumer does not pay the tax (businesses that produce GST-exempt supplies are not able to claim back input GST).

Because businesses claim back their input GST, the GST-inclusive price is usually irrelevant for business purchasing-decisions, other than in relation to cash-flow issues. Consequently, wholesalers often state prices exclusive of GST, but must collect the full, GST-inclusive price when they make the sale and must account to the IRD for the GST so collected.

Various online calculators may assist individuals and small businesses in determining GST-inclusive and GST-exclusive amounts.

== GST threshold ==
Persons or entities with annual turnover less than $60,000 do not have to register for GST, though they may still choose to do so. This threshold has increased three times since the introduction of GST in 1986.

Effective date	GST threshold	CPI-adjusted (Q1 2026)
1 October 1986	$24,000	$75,707
1 October 1990	$30,000	$68,092
1 October 2000	$40,000	$76,333
1 April 2009	$60,000	$91,625

== Digital services supplied by offshore companies ==
On 1 October 2016, the taxation of digital ('remote') services supplied by offshore companies (non-New Zealand) to consumers based in New Zealand changed. Since that date, a GST of 15% (dubbed the 'Netflix Tax') is applied to all supplies from offshore digital service suppliers to New Zealand-based consumers. It is the supplier's responsibility to apply, collect and remit the new GST to New Zealand's Inland Revenue Department.

That new piece of GST legislation mirrors similar rules governing the supply of digital services introduced in the European Union (EU) in January 2015 on the taxation of digital goods.

The general taxation of digital goods and services has become more common internationally since the OECD released its long-awaited BEPS report in October 2015. Action 1 of the report deals with the taxation of the digital economy. The report provided guidelines and recommendations for such taxes be they in the form of value-added tax, GST, equalisation levy, or withholding tax.

New Zealand is the latest jurisdiction to include such rules in legislation following in the path of Norway, the EU, South Africa, South Korea, Japan, and Australia.

== Compliance Costs ==
Several studies have investigated GST compliance costs in New Zealand. The first of these was published by Sandford and Hasseldine in 1992.

== See also ==
- Taxation in New Zealand
- Goods and Services Tax (India)
- Goods and Services Tax (Australia)
- Goods and Services Tax (Canada)
- Goods and Services Tax (Singapore)
- Goods and Services Tax (Malaysia)
