= List of schools in Christchurch =

There are 145 schools in Christchurch, New Zealand's second most-populous city, serving approximately 59,000 primary and secondary school students. Most schools are large urban schools based in the city of Christchurch itself, including some of the largest in the country, with several small rural primary schools and a combined primary/secondary school on Banks Peninsula.

In New Zealand schools, students begin formal education in Year 0 or Year 1 at the age of five depending on the school. Year 13 is the final year of formal education. The thirteen years of formal education are generally broken up into primary education (Years 1 to 8) and secondary education (Years 9 to 13). Generally, students complete Years 1 to 6 at a primary school and Years 9 to 13 at a secondary school. Years 7 and 8 may be taken at a primary school, secondary school, or a separate intermediate school. There are also composite schools which cover both primary and secondary education.

State schools are those fully funded by the government and at which no fees for tuition of domestic students (i.e. New Zealand citizens and permanent residents, and Australian citizens) can be charged, although a donation is commonly requested. A state integrated school is a former private school with a special character based on a religious or philosophical belief that has been integrated into the state system. Private schools charge fees to its students for tuition, as do state and state integrated schools for tuition of international students. In Christchurch, approximately 77 percent of students attend state schools, 15.5 percent attend state integrated schools, and 7.5 percent attend private schools.

The roll of each school changes frequently as students start school for the first time, move between schools, and graduate or drop out. The rolls given here are those provided by the Ministry of Education, and are based on figures from July 2026. The Ministry of Education institution number links to Education Counts page for each school.

== State schools ==
=== State primary and intermediate schools ===
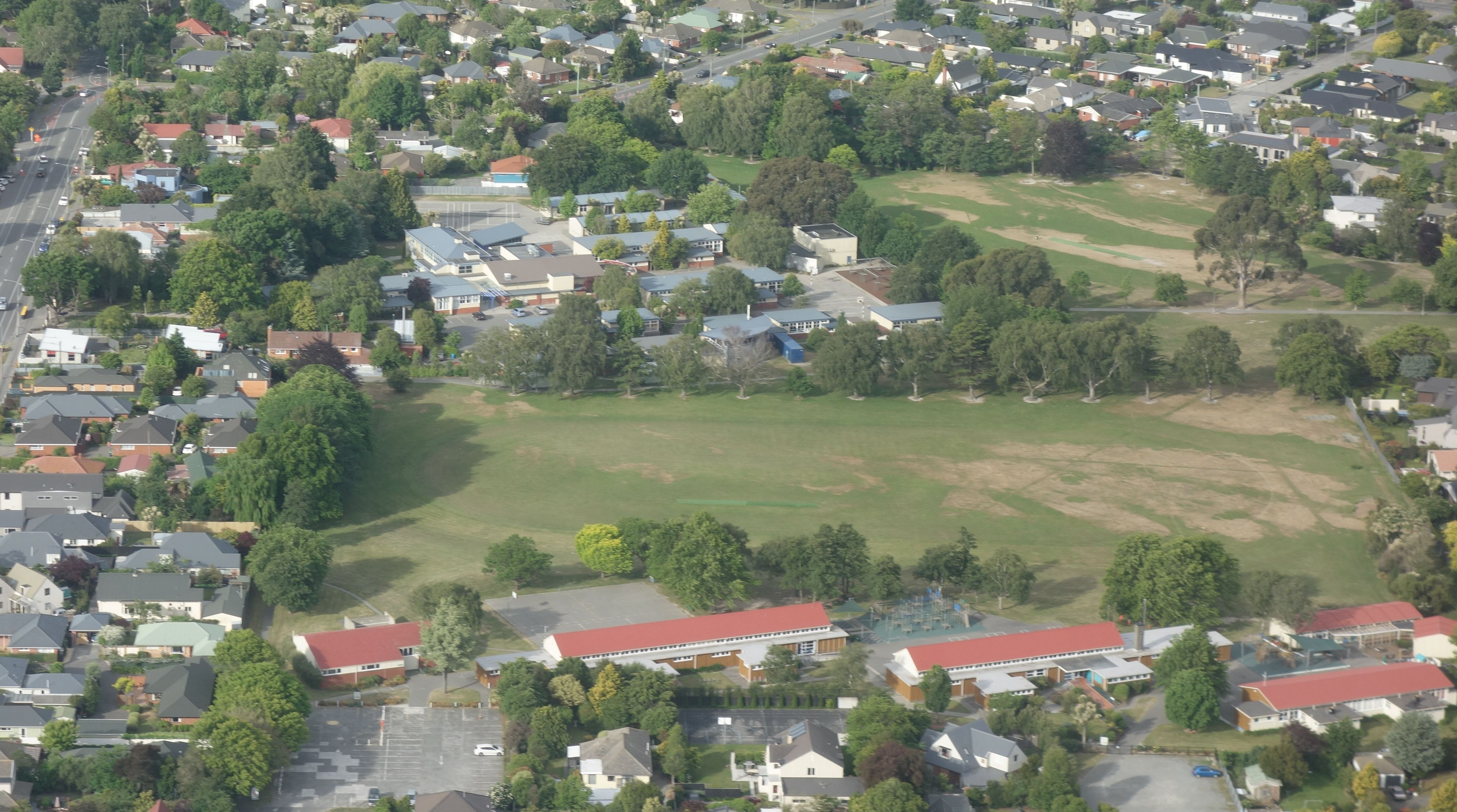
Cobham Intermediate School (centre) and Burnside Primary School (foreground)

All state primary and intermediate schools in Christchurch (and New Zealand) are coeducational.

| Name | MOE | Years | Location | Opened | Roll | Notes |
|---|---|---|---|---|---|---|
| Addington School | 3271 | 1–6 | Addington | 1881 | 340 | |
| Avonhead School | 3287 | 1–8 | Avonhead | 1959 | 591 | |
| Banks Avenue School | 3289 | 1–6 | Dallington | 1956 | 357 | |
| Beckenham Te Kura o Pūroto | 3291 | 1–8 | Beckenham | 1915 | 472 | |
| Belfast School | 3292 | 1–8 | Belfast | 1878 | 437 | |
| Bishopdale School | 3293 | 1–6 | Bishopdale | 1957 | 171 | |
| Breens Intermediate | 3299 | 7–8 | Bishopdale | 1976 | 273 | |
| Bromley School | 3302 | 1–6 | Bromley | 1880 | 359 | |
| Burnside Primary School | 3305 | 1–6 | Burnside | 1956 | 319 | |
| Casebrook Intermediate | 3309 | 7–8 | Casebrook | 1966 | 441 | |
| Cashmere Primary School | 3310 | 1–8 | Cashmere | 1900 | 488 | |
| Chisnallwood Intermediate | 3314 | 7–8 | Avondale | 1967 | 410 | |
| Christchurch East School | 3317 | 1–8 | Central City | 1873 | 294 | |
| Christchurch South Intermediate | 3318 | 7–8 | Spreydon | 1939 | 489 | |
| Cobham Intermediate | 3323 | 7–8 | Burnside | 1963 | 670 | |
| Cotswold School | 3324 | 1–6 | Bishopdale | 1968 | 545 | |
| Diamond Harbour School | 3327 | 1–8 | Diamond Harbour | 1945 | 110 | |
| Duvauchelle School | 3332 | 1–6 | Duvauchelle | 1860 | 25 | |
| Elmwood Normal School | 3334 | 1–6 | Merivale | 1882 | 541 | |
| Gilberthorpe School | 3346 | 1–6 | Hei Hei | 1957 | 234 | |
| Governors Bay School | 3354 | 1–8 | Governors Bay | 1868 | 92 | |
| Halswell School | 3366 | 1–8 | Halswell | 1864 | 733 | |
| Harewood School | 3370 | 1–6 | Harewood | 1862 | 160 | |
| Heathcote Valley School | 3371 | 1–8 | Heathcote Valley | 1860 | 188 | |
| Heaton Normal Intermediate | 3372 | 7–8 | Strowan | 1948 | 538 | |
| Hoon Hay School | 3379 | 1–6 | Hoon Hay | 1959 | 443 | |
| Hornby Primary School | 3380 | 1–6 | Hornby | 1895 | 257 | |
| Ilam School | 3384 | 1–6 | Ilam | 1950 | 378 | |
| Isleworth School | 3385 | 1–6 | Bishopdale | 1962 | 238 | |
| Kirkwood Intermediate | 3396 | 7–8 | Upper Riccarton | 1959 | 285 | |
| Knights Stream School | 579 | 1–8 | Halswell | 2019 | 647 | |
| Linwood Avenue School | 3413 | 1–6 | Linwood | 1928 | 337 | |
| Little River School | 3418 | 1–8 | Little River | 1873 | 36 | |
| Lyttelton Primary School | 686 | 1–8 | Lyttelton | 2014 | 130 | |
| Mairehau School | 3425 | 1–8 | Mairehau | 1953 | 379 | |
| Marshland School | 3429 | 1–8 | Marshland | 1888 | 591 | |
| Merrin School | 3434 | 1–8 | Avonhead | 1966 | 454 | |
| Mount Pleasant School | 3443 | 1–8 | Mt Pleasant | 1928 | 386 | |
| Ngutuawa School | 3288 | 1–8 | Woolston | 2020 | 136 | |
| Northcote School | 3449 | 1–6 | Redwood | 1960 | 156 | |
| Oaklands School | 3450 | 1–8 | Oaklands | 1964 | 641 | |
| Okains Bay School | 3452 | 1–8 | Okains Bay | 1872 | 9 | |
| Opawa School | 3455 | 1–8 | Opawa | 1872 | 367 | |
| Ouruhia Model School | 3464 | 1–8 | Ouruhia | 1914 | 22 | |
| Papanui School | 3466 | 1–6 | Papanui | 1871 | 230 | |
| Paparoa Street School | 3467 | 1–6 | Papanui | 1953 | 332 | |
| Parkview School | 3470 | 1–8 | Parklands | 1977 | 380 | |
| Queenspark School | 3479 | 1–8 | Parklands | 1977 | 453 | |
| Rawhiti School | 696 | 1–8 | North New Brighton | 2015 | 520 | |
| Redcliffs School | 3483 | 1–8 | Redcliffs | 1907 | 253 | |
| Redwood School | 3484 | 1–6 | Redwood | 1969 | 290 | |
| Riccarton School | 3485 | 1–8 | Upper Riccarton | 1873 | 367 | |
| Rowley Avenue School | 3492 | 1–6 | Hoon Hay | 1973 | 227 | |
| Roydvale School | 3493 | 1–6 | Burnside | 1967 | 284 | |
| Russley School | 3496 | 1–8 | Russley | 1963 | 425 | |
| Shirley Intermediate | 3503 | 7–8 | Shirley | 1934 | 192 | |
| Shirley Primary School | 3504 | 1–6 | Shirley | 1916 | 364 | |
| Somerfield School | 3506 | 1–6 | Somerfield | 1911 | 554 | |
| South Hornby School | 3507 | 1–6 | Hornby | 1962 | 306 | |
| South New Brighton School | 3508 | 1–8 | South New Brighton | 1922 | 381 | |
| Spreydon School | 3512 | 1–6 | Spreydon | 1865 | 279 | |
| St Albans School | 3518 | 1–6 | St Albans | 1873 | 572 | |
| St Martins School | 3534 | 1–8 | St Martins | 1956 | 477 | |
| Sumner School | 3546 | 1–8 | Sumner | 1876 | 321 | |
| Templeton School | 3555 | 1–8 | Templeton | 1861 | 283 | |
| Te Waka Unua School | 684 | 1–8 | Woolston | 2015 | 494 | |
| Thorrington School | 3557 | 1–6 | Cashmere | 1958 | 441 | |
| Tūora Fendalton School | 3338 | 1–6 | Fendalton | 1875 | 419 | |
| Waimairi School | 3571 | 1–6 | Strowan | 1914 | 320 | |
| Wairakei School | 3577 | 1–6 | Bryndwr | 1950 | 202 | |
| Waitākiri Primary School | 685 | 1–6 | Burwood | 2014 | 539 | |
| Waltham School | 3581 | 1–8 | Waltham | 1891 | 256 | |
| West Spreydon School | 3588 | 1–6 | Spreydon | 1926 | 271 | |
| Westburn School | 3589 | 1–8 | Ilam | 1962 | 457 | |
| Wharenui School | 3591 | 1–8 | Riccarton | 1907 | 411 | |
| Whītau School | 3415 | 1–6 | Linwood | 1908 | 295 | |
| Wigram Primary School | 3505 | 1–6 | Wigram | 1955 | 482 | |
| Yaldhurst Model School | 3602 | 1–8 | Yaldhurst | 1876 | 125 | |

=== State secondary and composite schools ===
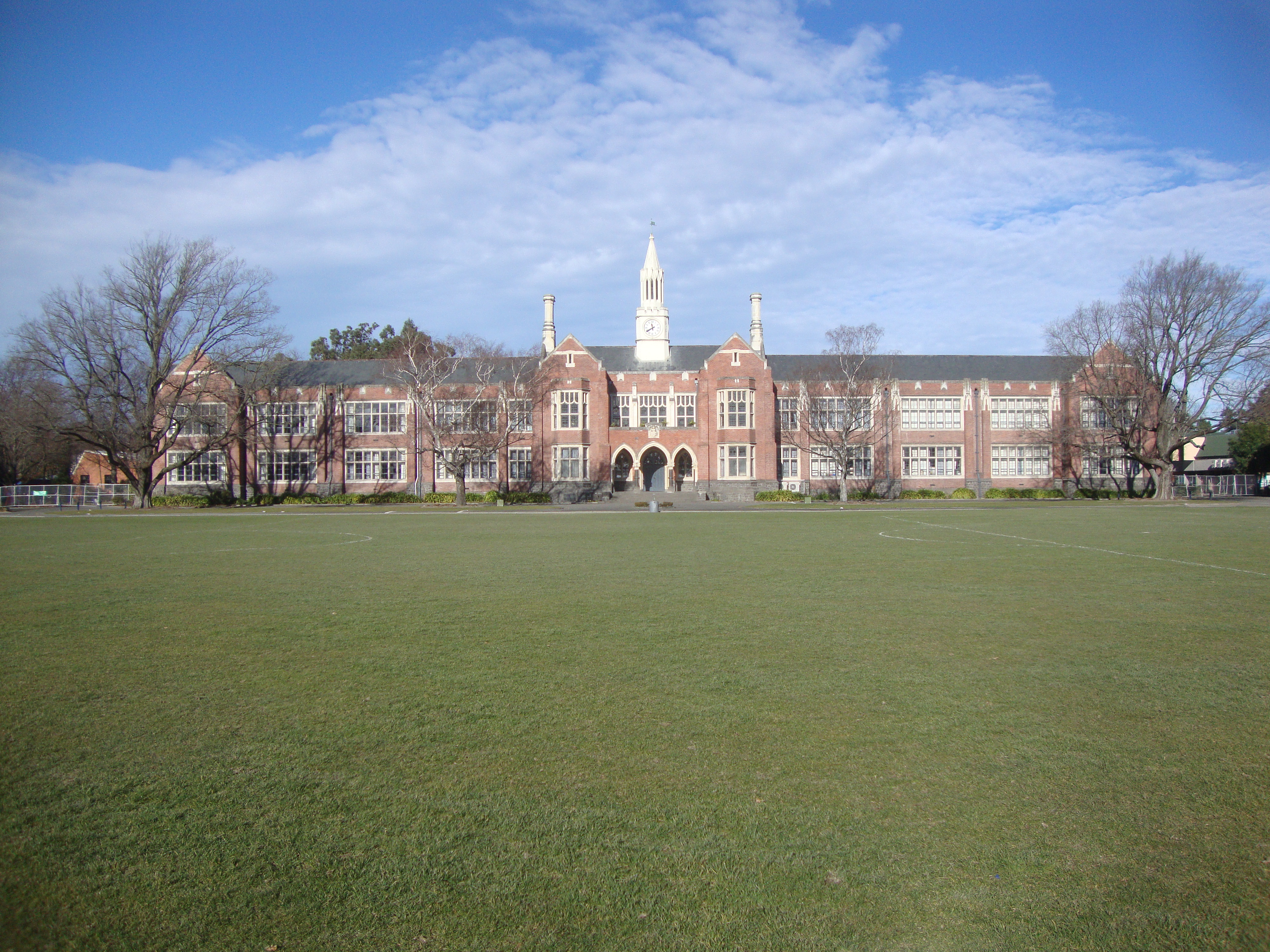
Christchurch Boys' High School

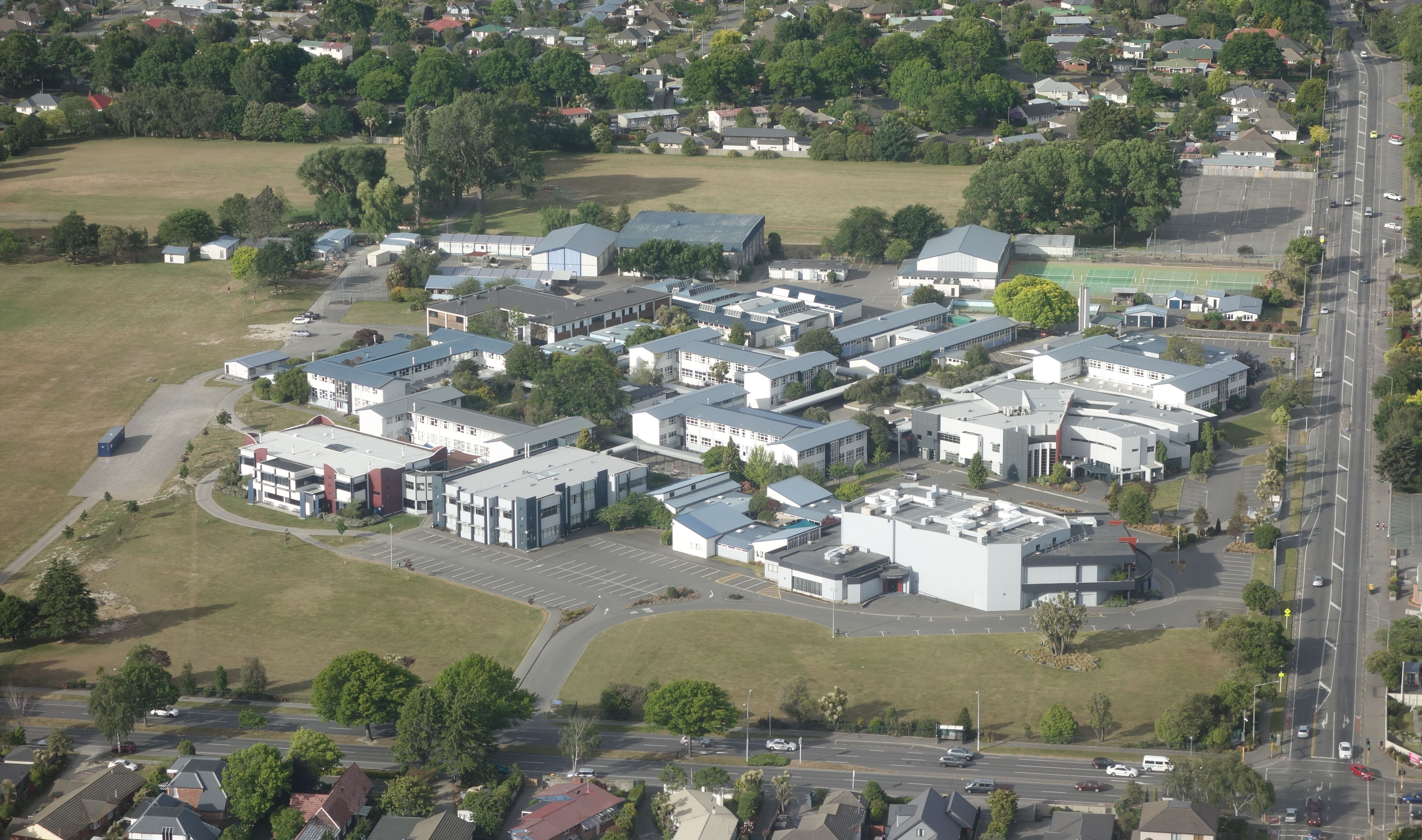
Burnside High School

| Name | MOE | Years | Gender | Location | Opened | Roll | Notes |
|---|---|---|---|---|---|---|---|
| Akaroa Area School | 350 | 1–13 | Coed | Akaroa | 1883 | 115 | |
| Ao Tawhiti Unlimited Discovery | 683 | 1–13 | Coed | Central City | 2014 | 649 | Designated Character (s156) |
| Avonside Girls' High School | 324 | 9–13 | Girls | North New Brighton | 1919 | 1,088 | |
| Burnside High School | 319 | 9–13 | Coed | Burnside | 1960 | 2,724 | |
| Cashmere High School | 340 | 9–13 | Coed | Somerfield | 1956 | 2,434 | |
| Christchurch Boys' High School | 327 | 9–13 | Boys | Fendalton | 1881 | 1,426 | Boarding |
| Christchurch Girls' High School | 328 | 9–13 | Girls | Riccarton | 1877 | 1,299 | Boarding |
| Haeata Community Campus | 704 | 1–13 | Coed | Wainoni | 2017 | 604 | |
| Hagley College | 336 | 9–13 | Coed | Central City | 1858 | 2,037 | Designated Character (s156) |
| Hillmorton High School | 339 | 7–13 | Coed | Hillmorton | 1961 | 1,430 | |
| Hornby High School | 338 | 7–13 | Coed | Hornby | 1975 | 1,022 | |
| Mairehau High School | 320 | 9–13 | Coed | Mairehau | 1961 | 410 | |
| Papanui High School | 316 | 9–13 | Coed | Papanui | 1936 | 1,416 | |
| Riccarton High School | 334 | 9–13 | Coed | Upper Riccarton | 1958 | 1,103 | |
| Shirley Boys' High School | 321 | 9–13 | Boys | North New Brighton | 1957 | 1,315 | |
| TKKM o Te Whanau Tahi | 1618 | 1–13 | Coed | Spreydon | 1990 | 230 | Kura Kaupapa Māori |
| TKKM o Whakapūmau | 4212 | 1–13 | Coed | Waltham | | 224 | Kura Kaupapa Māori |
| Te Aratai College | 337 | 7–13 | Coed | Phillipstown | 1954 | 1,260 | |
| Te Pā o Rākaihautū | 706 | 1–13 | Coed | Linwood | 2015 | 207 | Kura ā Iwi. Designated Character (s156) |

== State-integrated schools ==
State-integrated schools are former private schools with a special character based on a religious or philosophical belief that has been integrated into the state system under the Private Schools Conditional Integration Act 1975. They were established in the early 1970s as a response to the near-collapse of the country's then private Catholic school system, which had run into financial difficulties. The majority of state-integrated schools in Christchurch (and New Zealand) continue to be Catholic schools.

State integrated schools charge "attendance dues" to cover the building and maintenance of school buildings, which are not owned by the government, but otherwise they like state schools cannot charge fees for tuition of domestic students but may request a donation.

| Name | MOE | Years | Gender | Category | Location | Opened | Roll | Notes |
|---|---|---|---|---|---|---|---|---|
| Aidanfield Christian School | 82 | 1–10 | Coed | Christian | Aidanfield | | 465 | |
| Catholic Cathedral College | 531 | 7–13 | Coed | Catholic | Central City | 1987 | 601 | |
| Christ The King School | 3316 | 1–8 | Coed | Catholic | Burnside | 1959 | 317 | |
| Christchurch Adventist School | 317 | 1–13 | Coed | Adventist | Papanui | 1925 | 285 | |
| Emmanuel Christian School | 1168 | 1–10 | Coed | Christian | Bishopdale | | 287 | |
| Hillview Christian School | 341 | 1–10 | Coed | Christian | St Martins | | 548 | |
| Marian College | 343 | 9–13 | Girls | Catholic | Central City (Note: Marian College is currently based in the spare capacity at Catholic Cathedral College, after damage and liquefaction from the 2011 Christchurch earthquake deemed the existing site in Shirley unusable. A new site is being built near St Bede's College with expected completion in 2023.) | 1982 | 430 | |
| Middleton Grange School | 335 | 1–13 | Coed | Christian | Upper Riccarton | 1964 | 1,385 | |
| New Brighton Catholic School | 3445 | 1–8 | Coed | Catholic | New Brighton | | 195 | |
| Our Lady of the Assumption School | 3461 | 1–8 | Coed | Catholic | Hoon Hay | | 327 | |
| Our Lady of Victories School | 3463 | 1–8 | Coed | Catholic | Sockburn | 1956 | 254 | |
| Rudolf Steiner School | 419 | 1–13 | Coed | Waldorf | Opawa | 1975 | 282 | |
| Sacred Heart School | 3270 | 1–8 | Coed | Catholic | Addington | 1877 | 185 | |
| Star of the Sea School | 3544 | 1–8 | Coed | Catholic | Sumner | 1928 | 101 | |
| St Albans Catholic School | 3517 | 1–6 | Coed | Catholic | St Albans | 1955 | 111 | |
| St Anne's School | 3520 | 1–8 | Coed | Catholic | Woolston | | 179 | |
| St Bede's College | 315 | 9–13 | Boys | Catholic | Papanui | 1911 | 802 | Boarding |
| St Bernadette's School | 3521 | 1–8 | Coed | Catholic | Hei Hei | 1962 | 166 | |
| St Francis of Assisi Catholic School | 738 | 1–8 | Coed | Catholic | Mairehau | 2016 | 466 | |
| St James School | 3523 | 1–6 | Coed | Catholic | Aranui | 1965 | 100 | |
| St Joseph's School | 3531 | 1–8 | Coed | Catholic | Papanui | | 433 | |
| St Mark's School | 4135 | 1–8 | Coed | Anglican | Opawa | | 234 | |
| St Mary's School | 3535 | 1–8 | Coed | Catholic | Central City | 1894 | 123 | |
| St Patrick's School | 3537 | 1–8 | Coed | Catholic | Bryndwr | | 171 | |
| St Peter's School | 3542 | 1–8 | Coed | Catholic | Beckenham | 1927 | 156 | |
| St Teresa's School | 3543 | 1–8 | Coed | Catholic | Riccarton | | 171 | |
| St Thomas of Canterbury College | 331 | 7–13 | Boys | Catholic | Sockburn | 1961 | 700 | |
| Tamariki School | 4143 | 1–8 | Coed | | Woolston | 1966 | 49 | Special Character school, based on principles of A.S. Neill |
| Villa Maria College | 326 | 7–13 | Girls | Catholic | Upper Riccarton | 1918 | 829 | |

== Private schools ==
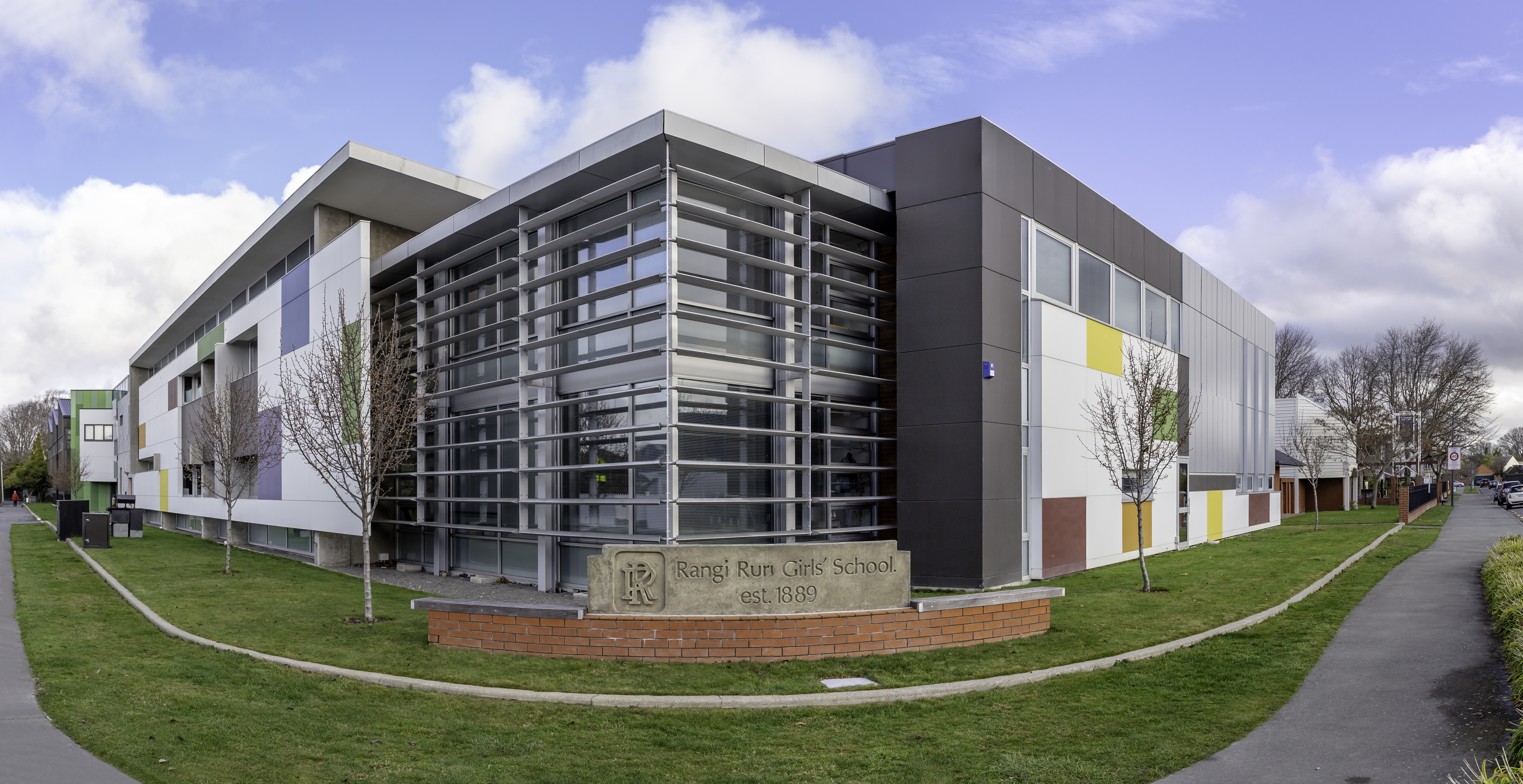
Rangi Ruru Girls' School

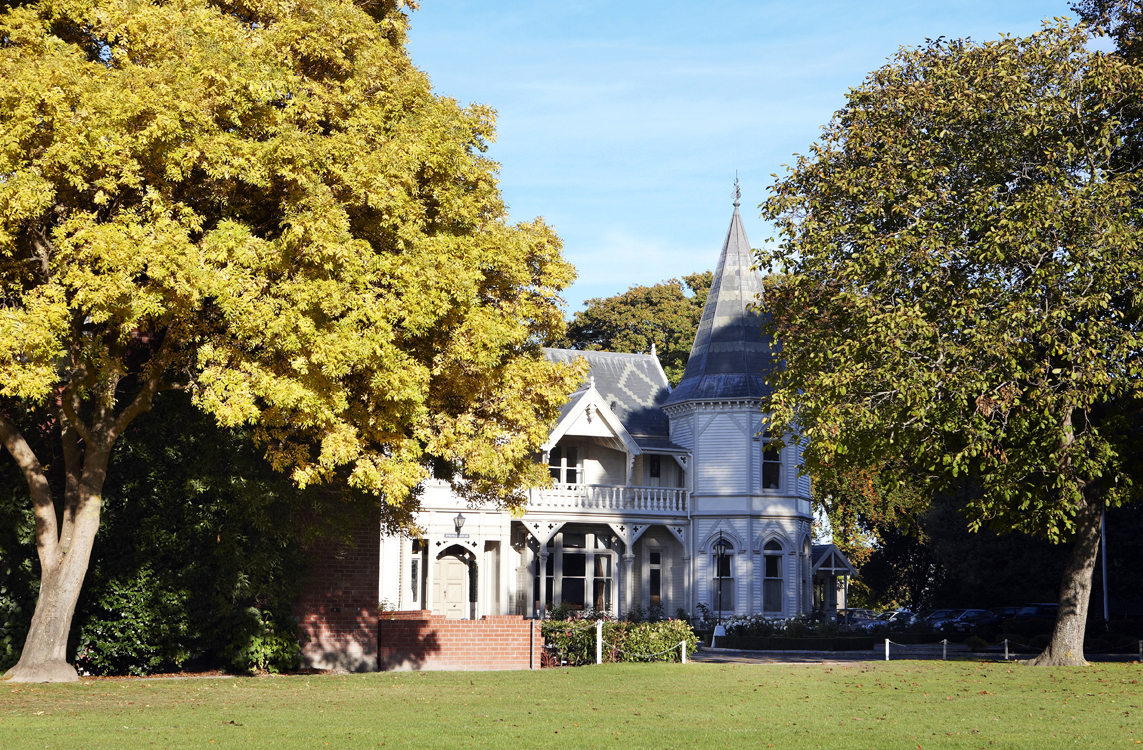
St Andrew's College

| Name | MOE | Years | Gender | Category | Location | Opened | Roll | Notes |
|---|---|---|---|---|---|---|---|---|
| Cathedral Grammar School | 368 | 1–8 | Coed | Anglican | Central City | 1881 | 245 | |
| Christ's College | 330 | 9–13 | Boys | Anglican | Central City | 1850 | 706 | Boarding |
| Jean Seabrook Memorial School | 2126 | 1–8 | Coed | | Richmond | | | |
| Medbury School | 4118 | 1–8 | Boys | | Ilam | 1923 | 372 | Boarding |
| Nova Montessori School | 1582 | 1–8 | Coed | Montessori | New Brighton | 1988 | 38 | |
| Rangi Ruru Girls' School | 325 | 7–13 | Girls | Presbyterian | Merivale | 1889 | 705 | Boarding |
| Selwyn House School | 4138 | 1–8 | Girls | | Merivale | 1929 | 294 | |
| Seven Oaks School | 610 | 1–8 | Coed | | Halswell | 2009 | | |
| Seven Oaks Secondary School | 695 | 9–13 | Coed | | Halswell | 2013 | | |
| St Andrew's College | 318 | 1–13 | Coed | Presbyterian | Strowan | 1917 | 1,634 | Boarding |
| St Margaret's College | 333 | 1–13 | Girls | Anglican | Merivale | 1910 | 867 | Boarding |
| St Michael's Church School | 4136 | 1–8 | Coed | Anglican | Central City | 1851 | 126 | |

== Special schools and teen parent units ==
| Name | MOE | Type | Gender | Location | Authority | Roll | Notes |
|---|---|---|---|---|---|---|---|
| Allenvale Special School and Residential Centre | 3275 | Intellectual impairments | Coed | Bryndwr | State | 135 | |
| Ferndale School | 3339 | Intellectual impairments | Coed | Merivale | State | 141 | |
| Halswell Residential College | 522 | Intellectual impairments | Boys | Aidanfield | State | 13 | |
| Kimihia Parents' College | 2761 | Teen Parent Unit | | Woolston | State | 0 (Note: Teen Parent Unit rolls are returned with their host school. In the case of Kimihia Parent's College, the host school is Linwood College.) | |
| Kingslea School | 518 | Learning / Social Difficulties | Coed | Shirley | State | 123 | |
| Southern Regional Health School | 1631 | Hospital school | Coed | Hillmorton | State | 20 | |
| Ko Taku Reo | 903 | Deaf / Hearing-impaired | Coed | Sumner | State | 104 | |

== Former schools ==
- Aorangi School in Bryndwr closed on 27 January 2010, with pupils disbursing to other schools.
- Birch Grove School – closed and merged with Mairehau School, April 2004
- Branston Intermediate, state intermediate at Hornby, closed in January 2014 as part of state school network review; Hornby High School added Years 7 and 8 as a result. In July 2017, South Hornby School relocated to the former school site.
- Burwood School, state contributing primary at Burwood, merged with Windsor School in January 2014 to form Waitakiri Primary School.
- Central New Brighton School, state full primary in New Brighton, merged with Freeville School and North New Brighton School in January 2015 to form Rawhiti School.
- Christchurch West High School, amalgamated with Technical High School in 1965 to become Hagley High School (now Hagley Community College)
- Freeville School, state full primary in New Brighton, merged with Central New Brighton School and North New Brighton School in January 2015 to form Rawhiti School.
- Glenelg Health Came School, Hillsborough – closed January 2012.
- Glenmoor School, state contributing primary at Mairehau, closed in January 2014 as part of state school network review.
- Hammersley Park School, state contributing primary in Shirley – closed voluntarily in January 2013 due to declining roll numbers and uneconomic costs to repair earthquake damage.
- Kendal School, state contributing primary at Burnside, closed in January 2014 as part of state school network review.
- Le Bons Bay School, state full primary on Banks Peninsula – closed voluntarily in January 2013 due to declining roll numbers.
- Linwood Intermediate, state intermediate at Linwood, closed in January 2014 as part of state school network review; Linwood College added Years 7 and 8 as a result.
- Lyttelton Main School, state full primary in Lyttelton, merged with Lyttelton West School in May 2014 to form Lyttelton Primary School.
- Lyttelton West School, state full primary in Lyttelton, merged with Lyttelton Main School in May 2014 to form Lyttelton Primary School.
- Manning Intermediate, state intermediate at Hoon Hay, closed in January 2014 as part of state school network review; Hillmorton High School added Years 7 and 8 as a result.
- Marylands School
- McKenzie Residential School, special school for learning and social difficulties in Russley, closed in January 2013.
- North New Brighton School, state full primary in New Brighton, merged with Freeville School and Central New Brighton School in January 2015 to form Rawhiti School.
- Our Lady of Fatima School, state-integrated Catholic full primary in Mairehau – merged with St Paul's School in January 2016 to form St Francis of Assisi Catholic School.
- Phillipstown School, state full primary school in Phillipstown merged with Woolston School in January 2015 to form Te Waka Unua School.
- Richmond School, state contributing primary at Richmond, closed in January 2014 as part of state school network review.
- A private primary school was opened in 1861 by Edward Morgan in Halswell. Likely closed by 1863, as it was on the site of Craythorne's Hotel.
- Sacred Heart College, opened 1959, amalgamated with Xavier College in 1987 to form Catholic Cathedral College.
- St Joseph's School, Barbadoes St, Christchurch.
- St Paul's School, state-integrated Catholic full primary in Dallington – school site was red-zoned after 2011 earthquake and temporarily moved to Edgeware; merged with Our Lady of Fatima School in January 2016 to form St Francis of Assisi Catholic School.
- Sydenham School, once the largest school in New Zealand, stood on the corner of Colombo and Brougham Streets. Closed December 2000.
- St Joseph's School, Lyttelton, closed January 2009.
- Xavier College, opened 1945, amalgamated with Sacred Heart College in 1987 to form Catholic Cathedral College.
- Windsor School, state contributing primary at Burwood, merged with Burwood School in January 2014 to form Waitakiri Primary School.
- Woolston School, state full primary school in Woolston, merged with Phillipstown School in January 2015 to form Te Waka Unua School.

=== 2013 state school network review ===
During 2013, Education Minister Hekia Parata announced a multitude of proposed changes to the state school network in Christchurch. In addition, Parata announced changes to some schools in the Selwyn and Waimakariri Districts.

In January 2014, six schools closed, four schools merged into two, and three schools added years in the first phase of changes. A third merger between Lyttelton Main School and Lyttelton West School took effective on 5 May 2014. The minister also confirmed and gazetted that Phillipstown School and Woolston School would merge on the Woolston site in January 2014. However, in June 2013, Phillipstown School asked the High Court for a judicial review, claiming Parata had acted illegally and made errors in her decision to close and merge the school. The review was accepted by the court, and the hearing began on 30 September 2013. On 10 October 2013, the High Court ruled in favour of Phillipstown School and overruled the Minister's decision. However, the merger went ahead, and on 2 February 2015, Te Waka Unua opened as the merged school on the site of the former Woolston School.
