= Somerfield, New Zealand =

Suburb of Christchurch, New Zealand

Somerfield
- Suburb
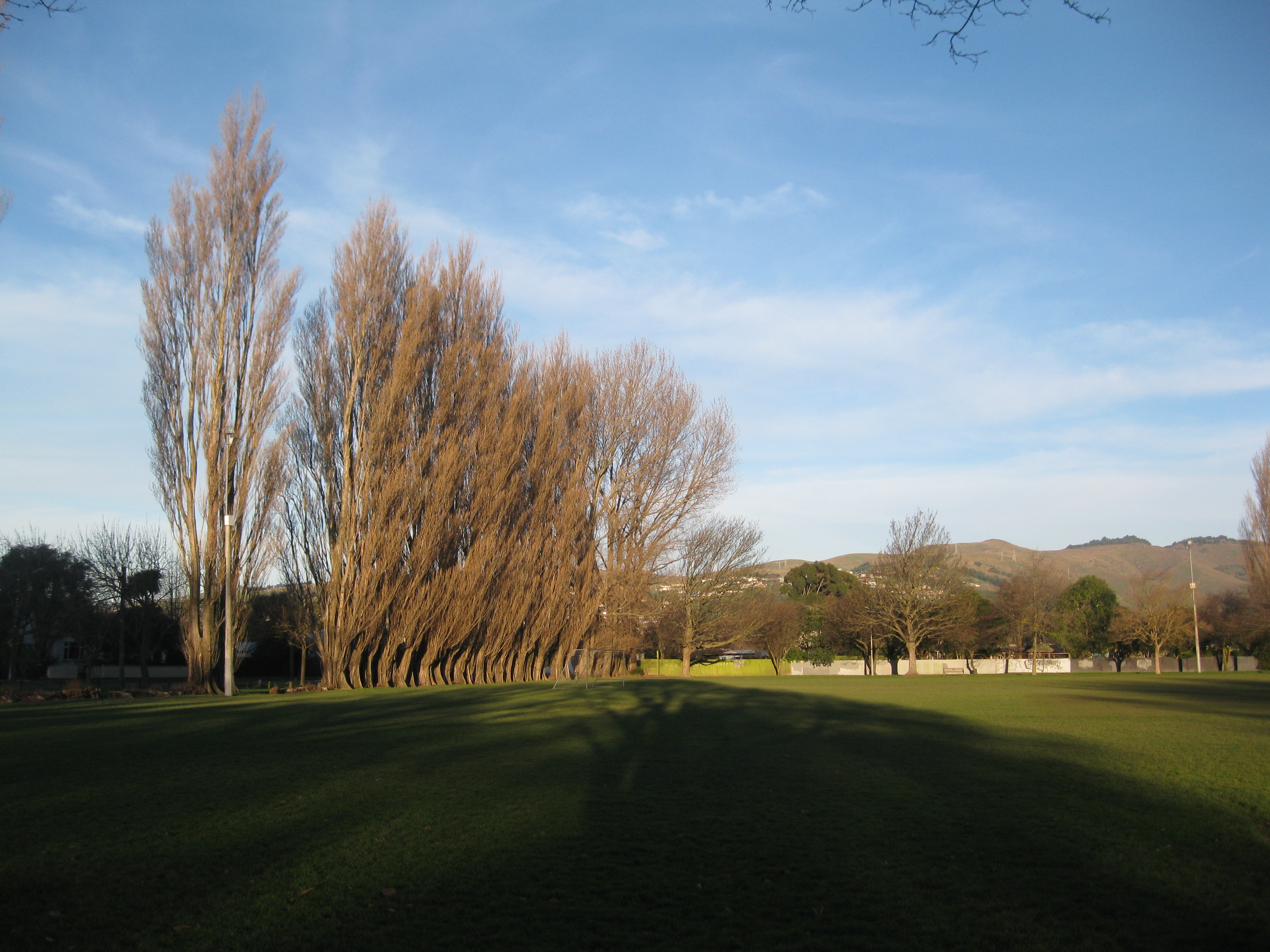
- Somerfield Park
- Interactive map of Somerfield
- Coordinates: 43°33′43.34″S 172°37′26.26″E
- Country: New Zealand
- City: Christchurch
- Local authority: Christchurch City Council
- Electoral ward: Cashmere
- Community board: Waihoro Spreydon-Cashmere-Heathcote

Area
  - Land: 241 ha (600 acres)

Population (June 2025)
  - Total: 7,080
  - Density: 2,940/km^{2} (7,610/sq mi)

Barrington	Spreydon	Sydenham
Hillmorton	Somerfield	Beckenham
Hoon Hay	Cashmere

Somerfield is a suburb in the south of Christchurch, New Zealand. It is nominally bordered by the Ōpāwaho / Heathcote River to the south and west, Strickland and Colombo Streets to the east, and Milton Street to the north. The suburb includes Somerfield School, Somerfield Park and a small number of shops which service the local area, although it is predominantly residential. Somerfield is also known for its wide variety of trees, especially along the banks of the Ōpāwaho / Heathcote River.

== Etymology ==
Edward Bishop, an early Mayor of Christchurch, was born at Somerfield House in Maidstone, Kent, England in 1811. He came to Christchurch on the Charlotte Jane with all his siblings, and together with his youngest brother Frederick Augustus Bishop (1818–1894) bought land south of Christchurch along the Ōpāwaho / Heathcote River. They called their farm Somerfield, after their birthplace, and they appear on both the 1853 jury list and electoral roll as living there. Somerfield has since been adopted for the name of the suburb in that part of Christchurch. The 17-hectare (42-acre) property was in 1864 owned by Richard Packer, who in turn passed it on to his son Henry William Packer (1831–1890).

== Demographics ==
Somerfield covers 2.41 km^{2} (0.93 sq mi). It had an estimated population of 7,080 as of June 2025, with a population density of 2,938 people per km^{2}.

Historical population
Year	Pop.	±% p.a.
2006	6,516	—
2013	6,774	+0.56%
2018	6,780	+0.02%
2023	6,810	+0.09%

Somerfield had a population of 6,810 in the 2023 New Zealand census, an increase of 30 people (0.4%) since the 2018 census, and an increase of 36 people (0.5%) since the 2013 census. There were 3,132 males, 3,639 females, and 39 people of other genders in 2,682 dwellings. 4.1% of people identified as LGBTIQ+. The median age was 39.8 years (compared with 38.1 years nationally). There were 1,296 people (19.0%) aged under 15 years, 1,146 (16.8%) aged 15 to 29, 3,129 (45.9%) aged 30 to 64, and 1,245 (18.3%) aged 65 or older.

People could identify as more than one ethnicity. The results were 88.5% European (Pākehā); 8.9% Māori; 2.4% Pasifika; 7.4% Asian; 2.0% Middle Eastern, Latin American and African New Zealanders (MELAA); and 2.2% other, which includes people giving their ethnicity as "New Zealander". English was spoken by 96.7%, Māori by 1.9%, Samoan by 0.5%, and other languages by 11.4%. No language could be spoken by 2.1% (e.g. too young to talk). New Zealand Sign Language was known by 0.5%. The percentage of people born overseas was 22.4, compared with 28.8% nationally.

Religious affiliations were 28.0% Christian, 0.9% Hindu, 0.6% Islam, 0.2% Māori religious beliefs, 0.8% Buddhist, 0.5% New Age, 0.1% Jewish, and 1.1% other religions. People who answered that they had no religion were 62.3%, and 5.6% of people did not answer the census question.

Of those at least 15 years old, 1,881 (34.1%) people had a bachelor's or higher degree, 2,580 (46.8%) had a post-high school certificate or diploma, and 1,056 (19.2%) people exclusively held high school qualifications. The median income was $42,400, compared with $41,500 nationally. 756 people (13.7%) earned over $100,000 compared to 12.1% nationally. The employment status of those at least 15 was 2,721 (49.3%) full-time, 861 (15.6%) part-time, and 132 (2.4%) unemployed.

Individual statistical areas
Name	Area (km^{2})	Population	Density (per km^{2})	Dwellings	Median age	Median income
Somerfield East	1.23	3,699	3,007	1,491	38.0 years	$47,400
Somerfield West	1.18	3,111	2,636	1,191	42.5 years	$37,300
New Zealand					38.1 years	$41,500

== Education ==
Somerfield Te Kura Wairepo is a contributing co-educational primary school for years 1 to 6 with a roll of 554 students. The school opened in 1911.

Cashmere High School is a co-educational secondary school for years 9 to 13 with a roll of 2,434 students. Rolls are as of July 2026. The school opened in 1956 in response to the city's growing population. The school symbal is a lymphad, chosen by the school's founding headmaster. In 1972, it was gifted its Māori name,Te iringa o Kahukura, which means “The Uplifting of the Rainbow God".
