= Middleton, New Zealand =

Suburb of Christchurch, New Zealand

Middleton
- Suburb
- Interactive map of Middleton
- Coordinates: 43°32′30″S 172°34′45″E
- Country: New Zealand
- City: Christchurch
- Local authority: Christchurch City Council
- Electoral ward: Spreydon; Riccarton
- Community board: Waipuna Halswell-Hornby-Riccarton; Waihoro Spreydon-Cashmere-Heathcote

Area
  - Land: 190 ha (470 acres)

Population (June 2025)
  - Total: 230
  - Density: 120/km^{2} (310/sq mi)
- Postcode: 8041

Sockburn	Upper Riccarton	Riccarton
Wigram	Middleton	Addington
	Hillmorton	Spreydon

Middleton is a predominantly industrial and wholesale suburb of Christchurch, New Zealand. It is located in the west of the city, between Wigram and Addington, and immediately to the south of Upper Riccarton.

Middleton's boundaries are typically defined by major roads. The western and southern boundaries are State Highways 73 and 76 respectively, with State Highway 75 continuing from the junction of the two at the southern tip of Middleton. Blenheim Road, a major Christchurch thoroughfare with multiple retail and commercial premises, forms much of the northern limit, while Matipo Street generally defines the eastern boundary, with Addington Raceway and Horncastle Arena just beyond in neighbouring Addington.

The suburb is also home to a large rail yard operated by KiwiRail, connecting Christchurch to both the South Island Main Trunk Railway and the Midland Line.

== Demographics ==
Middleton covers 1.90 km^{2} (0.73 sq mi). It had an estimated population of 230 as of June 2025, with a population density of 23 people per km^{2}.

Historical population
Year	Pop.	±% p.a.
2006	174	—
2013	213	+2.93%
2018	189	−2.36%
2023	204	+1.54%

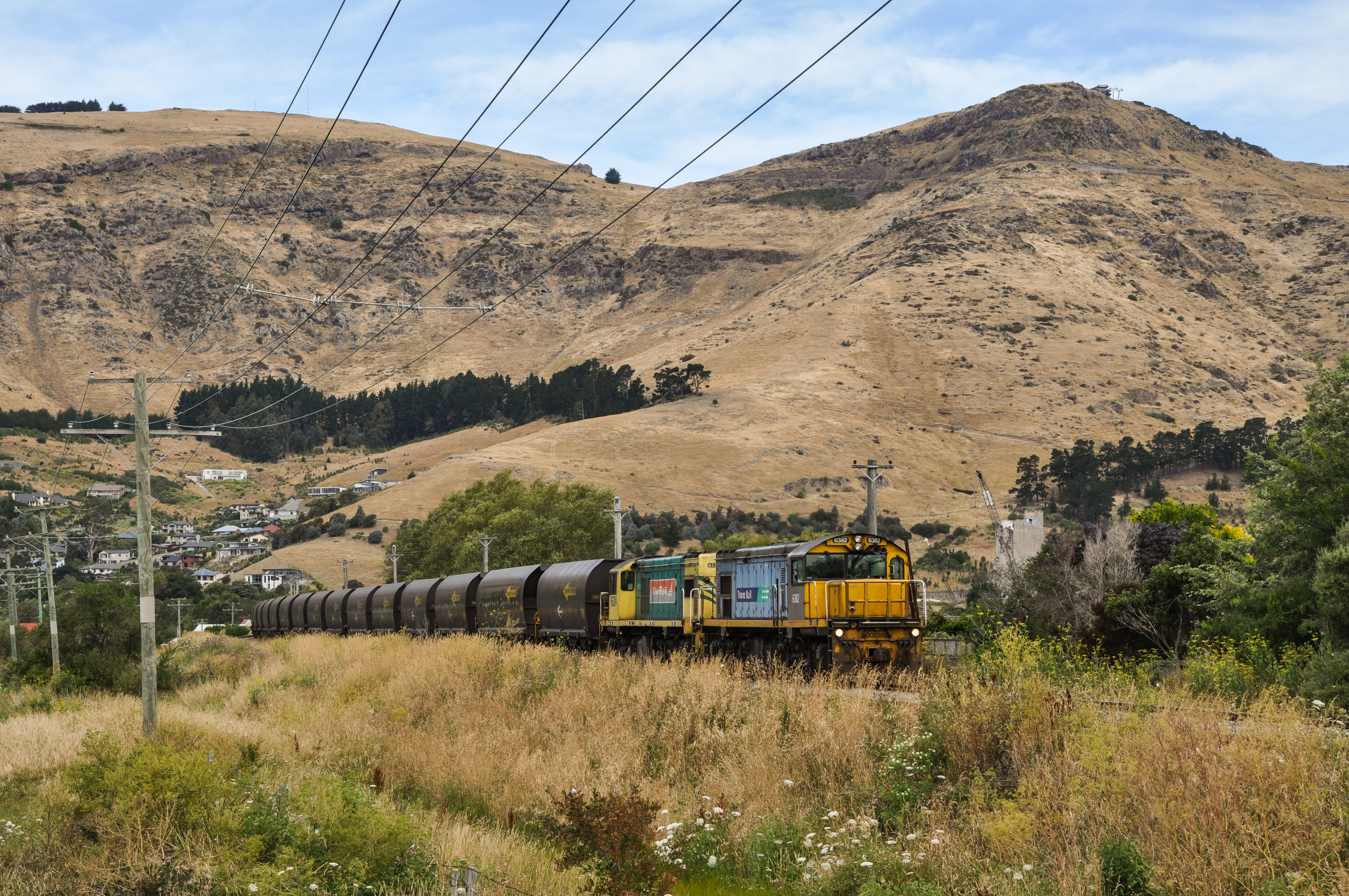
Port to Middleton

Middleton had a population of 204 in the 2023 New Zealand census, an increase of 15 people (7.9%) since the 2018 census, and a decrease of 9 people (−4.2%) since the 2013 census. There were 114 males and 87 females in 66 dwellings. 10.3% of people identified as LGBTIQ+. The median age was 22.9 years (compared with 38.1 years nationally). There were 6 people (2.9%) aged under 15 years, 132 (64.7%) aged 15 to 29, 54 (26.5%) aged 30 to 64, and 9 (4.4%) aged 65 or older.

People could identify as more than one ethnicity. The results were 58.8% European (Pākehā); 8.8% Māori; 1.5% Pasifika; 33.8% Asian; 2.9% Middle Eastern, Latin American and African New Zealanders (MELAA); and 2.9% other, which includes people giving their ethnicity as "New Zealander". English was spoken by 95.6%, Māori by 1.5%, and other languages by 26.5%. The percentage of people born overseas was 42.6, compared with 28.8% nationally.

Religious affiliations were 22.1% Christian, 4.4% Hindu, 10.3% Islam, and 5.9% other religions. People who answered that they had no religion were 52.9%, and 1.5% of people did not answer the census question.

Of those at least 15 years old, 27 (13.6%) people had a bachelor's or higher degree, 99 (50.0%) had a post-high school certificate or diploma, and 60 (30.3%) people exclusively held high school qualifications. The median income was $19,200, compared with $41,500 nationally. 6 people (3.0%) earned over $100,000 compared to 12.1% nationally. The employment status of those at least 15 was 63 (31.8%) full-time, 30 (15.2%) part-time, and 18 (9.1%) unemployed.
