= Barrington, New Zealand =

Suburb in Christchurch, New Zealand

Barrington
- Suburb
- Interactive map of Barrington
- Coordinates: 43°33′20″S 172°37′6″E
- Country: New Zealand
- City: Christchurch
- Local authority: Christchurch City Council
- Electoral ward: Spreydon

Area
  - Land: 72 ha (180 acres)

Population (2018)
  - Total: 2,364
  - Density: 3,300/km^{2} (8,500/sq mi)

	Spreydon	Sydenham
Hillmorton	Barrington	Beckenham
Hoon Hay	Somerfield

Barrington is a district in the south of Christchurch, New Zealand, along Barrington Road, covering parts of Spreydon and Somerfield. It is centred around Barrington Mall shopping centre. In 2006, for the purposes of the census, the area was classified as a suburb by government organisations such as Statistics New Zealand and was divided into two areas named Barrington South and Barrington North. For the 2018 census, the area of Barrington was instead primarily included within the statistical area of Spreydon South.

== History ==
The first European owner of the land was Captain Charles Simeon. In 1851, he chose 500 acres (2.0 km^{2}) of land and had frontages with Wilderness Road, the road leading to the Heathcote River, and the road leading from Christchurch to Halswell. The land was numbered in the order of it having been chosen, and his land was thus known as Rural Section 154.

Simeon died in 1867 and his widow requested through land agents Richard J. S. Harman and Edward Cephas John Stevens that Wilderness Road be renamed Barrington Road in honour of her grandfather, Sir Fitzwilliam Barrington, 10th Baronet. This request was granted in 1885, and it is today known as Barrington Street.

== Economy ==
=== Barrington Shopping Centre ===
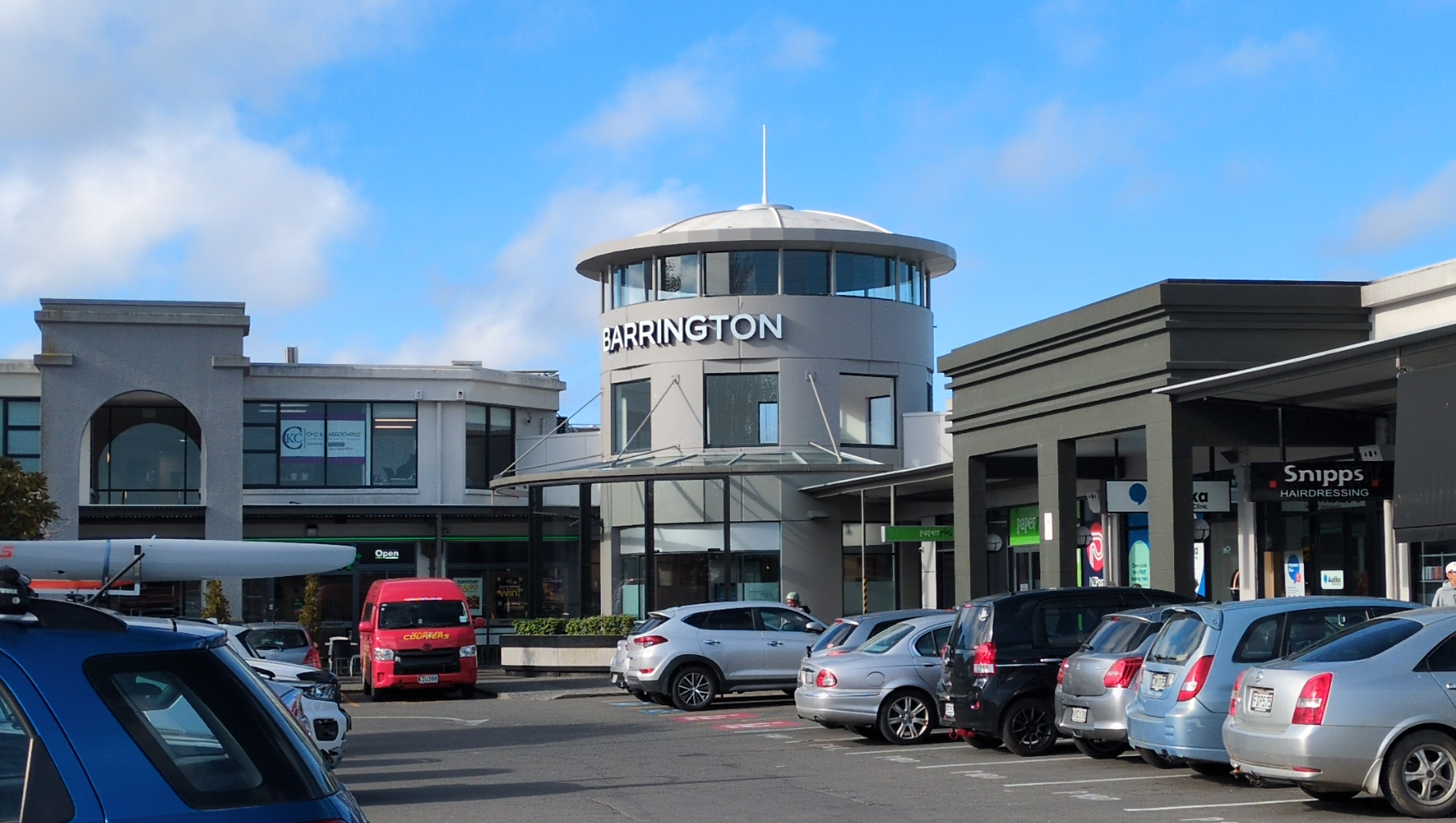
Barrington Shopping Centre in 2025

Barrington Shopping Centre is a commercial premises covering an area of 14,959 m^{2}. The mall was developed in the 1960s and has expanded over the years, most notably in 2011 when a large indoor wing was constructed.

Barrington Shopping Centre has 700 carparks and 52 retailers, including FreshChoice and The Warehouse.
