= Aidanfield =

Suburb of Christchurch, New Zealand

- Suburb
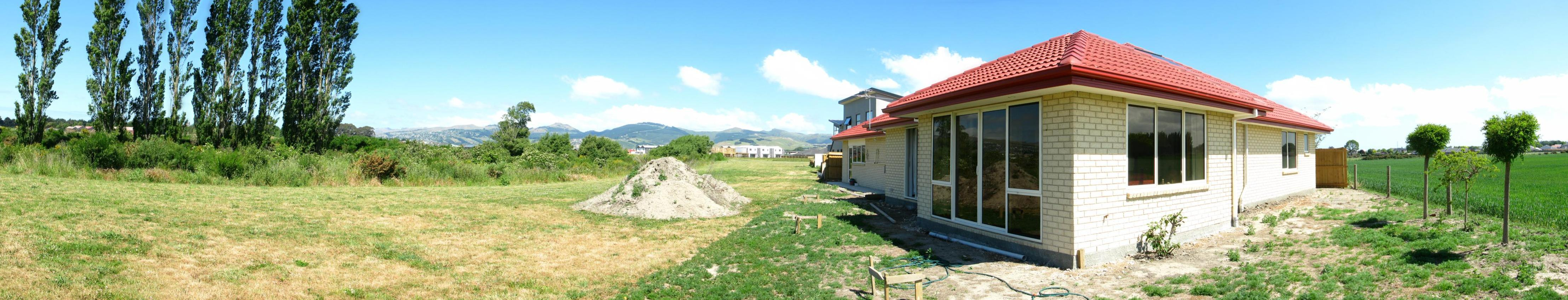
- New houses in Aidanfield
- Interactive map of Aidanfield
- Coordinates: 43.565°S 172.569°E
- Country: New Zealand
- City: Christchurch
- Local authority: Christchurch City Council
- Electoral ward: Halswell
- Community board: Waipuna Halswell-Hornby-Riccarton

Area
  - Land: 168 ha (420 acres)

Population (June 2025)
  - Total: 4,070
  - Density: 2,420/km^{2} (6,270/sq mi)

Hornby	Wigram	Hillmorton
	Aidanfield	Hoon Hay
Prebbleton	Halswell	Westmorland

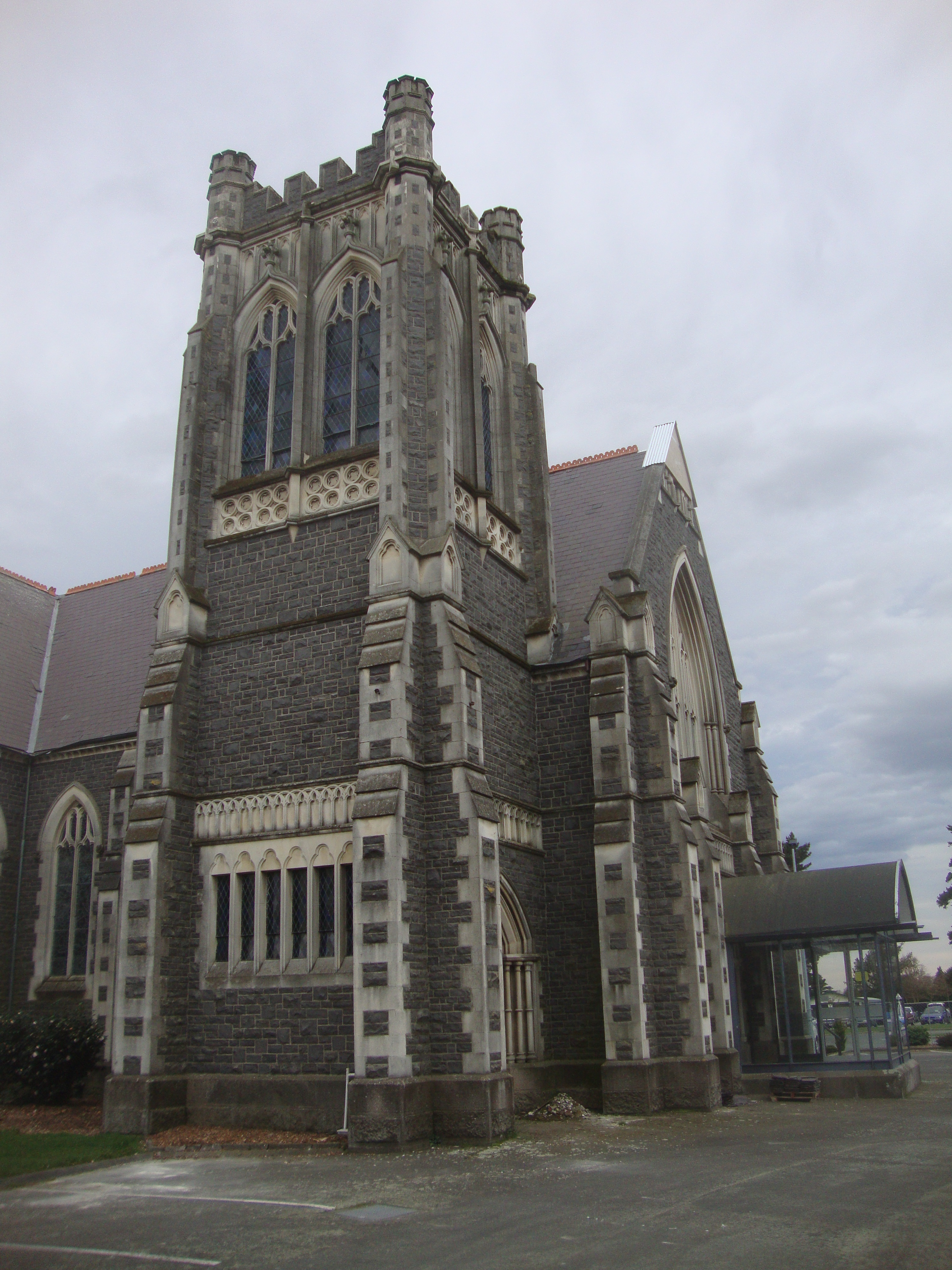
The St John of God Chapel, September 2011

Aidanfield is a suburb in the south-west of Christchurch, New Zealand, about 8 kilometres (5.0 mi) from the city centre. The land, which had been owned by the Good Shepherd Sisters since 1886, now incorporates the Mount Magdala Institute and the St John of God Chapel, which has a Category I heritage listing by the New Zealand Historic Places Trust (now Heritage New Zealand). The first residents moved into the suburb in 2002. The developer caused controversy in 2007–2008 by applying to have a group of farm buildings demolished to allow for further subdivision. Christchurch City Council was widely criticised for approving the demolition despite the buildings having had a heritage listing in the Christchurch City Plan.

== Geography ==
Aidanfield is located between Halswell Road (State Highway 75), Dunbars Road, the Christchurch Southern Motorway, the Canterbury Agricultural Park (home of the Canterbury A&P Show) and Templetons Road.

The centre of Aidanfield is about 8 kilometres (5.0 mi) from Christchurch city centre.

== Historic background ==
Father Laurence Ginaty established the Mount Magdala Institute in 1886 to provide a home for women and girls. It developed into an institution caring for women recently released from prison, orphans, and "unruly girls". Numerous buildings were constructed, and at its peak in the 1930s, 500 people lived on the complex. The St John of God Chapel, designed by Sidney and Alfred Luttrell and now listed as a Category I heritage structure by Heritage New Zealand, was completed in 1912.

The Catholic order owned all the land around Mount Magdala, and decided to develop most of it as a subdivision to provide them with financial support. The Press first reported in mid-2000 on the subdivision plans.

== Naming ==
The suburb is named after Mother Aidan Phelan (1858–1958), the Superior at Mount Magdala from 1907 to 1920 and again from 1929 to 1936. Mother Aidan was herself named after the Irish saint Aidan of Lindisfarne. The name Aidanfield was approved on 31 January 2001.

== Demographics ==
Aidanfield covers 1.68 km^{2} (0.65 sq mi). It had an estimated population of 4,070 as of June 2025, with a population density of 2,423 people per km^{2}.

Historical population
Year	Pop.	±% p.a.
2006	1,296	—
2013	2,892	+12.15%
2018	3,903	+6.18%
2023	3,870	−0.17%

Aidanfield had a population of 3,870 in the 2023 New Zealand census, a decrease of 33 people (−0.8%) since the 2018 census, and an increase of 978 people (33.8%) since the 2013 census. There were 1,836 males, 2,025 females, and 6 people of other genders in 1,263 dwellings. 2.7% of people identified as LGBTIQ+. The median age was 40.8 years (compared with 38.1 years nationally). There were 678 people (17.5%) aged under 15 years, 627 (16.2%) aged 15 to 29, 1,791 (46.3%) aged 30 to 64, and 774 (20.0%) aged 65 or older.

People could identify as more than one ethnicity. The results were 61.2% European (Pākehā); 4.6% Māori; 1.9% Pasifika; 36.8% Asian; 1.0% Middle Eastern, Latin American and African New Zealanders (MELAA); and 2.2% other, which includes people giving their ethnicity as "New Zealander". English was spoken by 92.8%, Māori by 1.3%, Samoan by 0.9%, and other languages by 30.4%. No language could be spoken by 2.1% (e.g. too young to talk). New Zealand Sign Language was known by 0.2%. The percentage of people born overseas was 37.0, compared with 28.8% nationally.

Religious affiliations were 39.8% Christian, 1.9% Hindu, 1.6% Islam, 0.1% Māori religious beliefs, 1.3% Buddhist, 0.1% New Age, and 1.0% other religions. People who answered that they had no religion were 48.8%, and 5.3% of people did not answer the census question.

Of those at least 15 years old, 1,071 (33.6%) people had a bachelor's or higher degree, 1,380 (43.2%) had a post-high school certificate or diploma, and 735 (23.0%) people exclusively held high school qualifications. The median income was $40,000, compared with $41,500 nationally. 465 people (14.6%) earned over $100,000 compared to 12.1% nationally. The employment status of those at least 15 was 1,569 (49.2%) full-time, 459 (14.4%) part-time, and 54 (1.7%) unemployed.

== Subdivision development and amenities ==
The first residents moved into Aidanfield in 2002, and by 2011 some 400 sections had been built on; when the subdivision is fully developed, more than 50 new roads will have been created. The 2006 New Zealand census reported 1320 residents in the Aidanfield area unit. Statistics New Zealand have estimated the suburb's 2010 population at 2400 residents.

The subdivision developer caused controversy in 2007 after applying to have four of the five historic Magdala Farm buildings demolished to make way for further subdivision. Although the buildings were protected in the Christchurch City Council District Plan, councillors voted eight to four in favour of granting demolition consent. Staff advice to councillors had been that the "farm buildings in their current form have high regional and moderate national heritage significance and therefore should be considered with the Deans' farm buildings to be the most significant heritage farm buildings remaining in Christchurch." The consent was appealed by Environment Canterbury and the Halswell Residents' Association to the Environment Court, with the New Zealand Historic Places Trust as a supporting party, but the demolition went ahead.

There are no shopping facilities in Aidanfield; the nearest shops are in neighbouring Halswell, about 2.5 kilometres (1.6 mi) away. A multi-sports complex, Ngā Puna Wai Sports Hub, is located in Aidanfield.

== Education ==
Te Whānau o Ōtūmatua is a short-term intervention school for primary and secondary students with learning difficulties. Located on Mount Magdala land, the school had a roll of 13 as of .July 2026 It opened in 1984 as Hogden School, replacing Marylands School, which had opened in 1955. The name changed to Halswell Residential College in 2003. It was still called Halswell in November 2025. After the 2011 Christchurch earthquake, Discovery 1 School and Unlimited Paenga Tawhiti (UPT) used the campus of this school. UPT moved to Ilam in 2013, whilst Discovery 1 remained at the Halswell Residential College, until the two schools, now merged as Ao Tawhiti, moved to a new site in the central city.

Aidanfield Christian School is a state-integrated school for years 1 to 13. Also on Mount Magdala land, it had a roll of 465 as of .July 2026 It opened in 1996 as a merger of Avon Christian College (opened 1989 as Avon Christian School) and Kings Christian School (opened 1982 as Calvary Christian School). It became state integrated in 1999.
