= Christchurch Adventist School =

Location
- 15 Grants Road, Papanui, Christchurch; 43.498721°S 172.611599°E

Information
- Type: State-integrated
- Motto: Educating for Eternity
- Established: 1925
- Ministry of Education Institution no.: 317
- Principal: Evan Ellis
- Years: 1–13
- Gender: Co-educational
- Enrolment: 285 (July 2026)
- Socio-economic decile: 5M
- Website: www.cas.school.nz

Christchurch Adventist School (CAS) is a co-educational composite school (years 1–13) in Papanui suburb of Christchurch, New Zealand. It is owned and operated by the Seventh-day Adventist Church.

The school is ethnically diverse, with 39% of students New Zealand European, 7% Māori, 10% Samoan, 8% Other Pacific, 7% Asian, 15% European and 14% other (including Latin American and African).

== History ==
The school was first established in 1925. Earlier attempts by church members to establish a Christian school in Christchurch began in 1903, which lasted only a short time before closing in 1904. Another attempt was begun in 1914, when a kindergarten building (which still stands, at 5 Grove Street, Addington) was purchased, and the school opened by Pr. A. G. Daniells, on 20 June 1914. This school closed in 1920 and the land sold, with proceeds placed in a school fund for future use. The site of the current school (in Papanui) was purchased in 1924 for £500, and the school opened on 27 April 1924, with Miss Maude Smart as the teacher, and a roll of 22. The school has been continuously operating on the site since then.

A secondary curriculum was offered from around 1932, with a new block (costing £660) of 3 classrooms being built. A uniform was adopted for the 1933 year, using the former Australasian Union Conference colours of blue and green.

A new woodwork room and toilet block were built in the 1950s by Mr S. Presnall and others from the Papanui Church. The secondary department building was built in 1985, and more recently (2006) the computer lab and staff room were re-developed and enlarged. New courts (2004) and a freshly laid field (2006) have given the school improved outdoor facilities.

== Student life ==
From 2003 the school's Year 12 students have participated in service trips, to poorer schools in the Pacific. The students raise all the money needed from many fund-raising ventures, including running the school tuck-shop, selling chocolate, lamingtons & pizzas, washing cars, hosting service auctions and more. The students then fix, clean and paint classrooms and other buildings (dining rooms, kitchens, libraries). Destinations have been Vanuatu (twice), Samoa, Rarotonga, and Fiji.

== Academics ==
In 2007, Years 11 to 13 students achieved significantly better results in national qualifications than in the two previous years. Over 70% of students gained Level 1 in the National Certificate of Educational Achievement (NCEA) compared to 63% in equivalent schools. Students also gained a similar percentage of merit endorsements to these schools.

In 2007, Year 11 students achieved better than in previous years in key areas. For example, 82% achieved the NCEA Level 1 literacy requirement, compared with 79% in equivalent schools, and 86% achieved the numeracy requirement, compared with 88% in equivalent schools.

Students who studied for Levels 2 and 3 NCEA achieved very well, with all students gaining appropriate qualifications. However, the small numbers of students make comparisons with equivalent schools statistically unreliable. All five Year 12 students had their certificates endorsed with merit. There were no excellence endorsements at Levels 2 or 3. Achievement of University Entrance has been variable over recent years.

Māori students achieve slightly better in NCEA than those in equivalent schools (5% above). Pacific students achieve well in individual subject areas.

NCEA Qualifications achieved at Christchurch Adventist School during 2009
| Qualification | Year 11 | Year 12 | Year 13 | Total |
|---|---|---|---|---|
| Number of Students on 1 July roll | 14 | 21 | 15 | 88 |
| National Certificate of Educational Achievement | | | | |
| NCEA Level 1 | 16 | 2 | | 18 |
| Achieved with Merit | 2 | 3 | 2 | 7 |
| Achieved with Excellence | | 2 | | 2 |
| No Endorsements | 11 | 11 | 13 | 35 |
| NCEA Level 2 | | 18 | 15 | 33 |
| Achieved with Merit | | 5 | 1 | 6 |
| No Endorsements | | 13 | 14 | 27 |
| NCEA Level 3 | | | 13 | 13 |
| Achieved with Merit | | | 1 | 1 |
| No Endorsements | | | 12 | 12 |

== See also ==
- Seventh-day Adventist education
- List of Seventh-day Adventist secondary schools
