= Breens Intermediate =

Breens Intermediate School

Location
- 85 Breens Road, Bishopdale, Christchurch; Christchurch; New Zealand; 43.4874°S 172.5768°E

Information
- Other names: Te Puna Waiora o Hereora
- Type: State coed intermediate, years 7–8
- Motto: BEST – Better Every Single Time
- Established: 3 February 1976
- Ministry of Education Institution no.: 3299
- Principal: Nikki Clarke
- Years offered: 7,8
- Enrolment: 273 (July 2026)
- Classes: Nine
- Language: English
- Color: Blue
- Socio-economic decile: 7O
- Website: breens.school.nz https://www.facebook.com/BreensIntermediateSchool/
- Last updated: 5/17/26

Breens Intermediate School (also known in Māori as Te Puna Waiora o Hereora) is located in Bishopdale in Christchurch, New Zealand. It has a roll of 273 students as of July 2026 and serves year 7 and 8 students. The principal, Nikki Clarke leads the school, with Nathan Maclennan as the deputy. Established in 1976, Breens Intermediate is located just east of Christchurch International Airport.
