= Bishopdale, Christchurch =

Suburb of Christchurch, New Zealand

Bishopdale
- Suburb
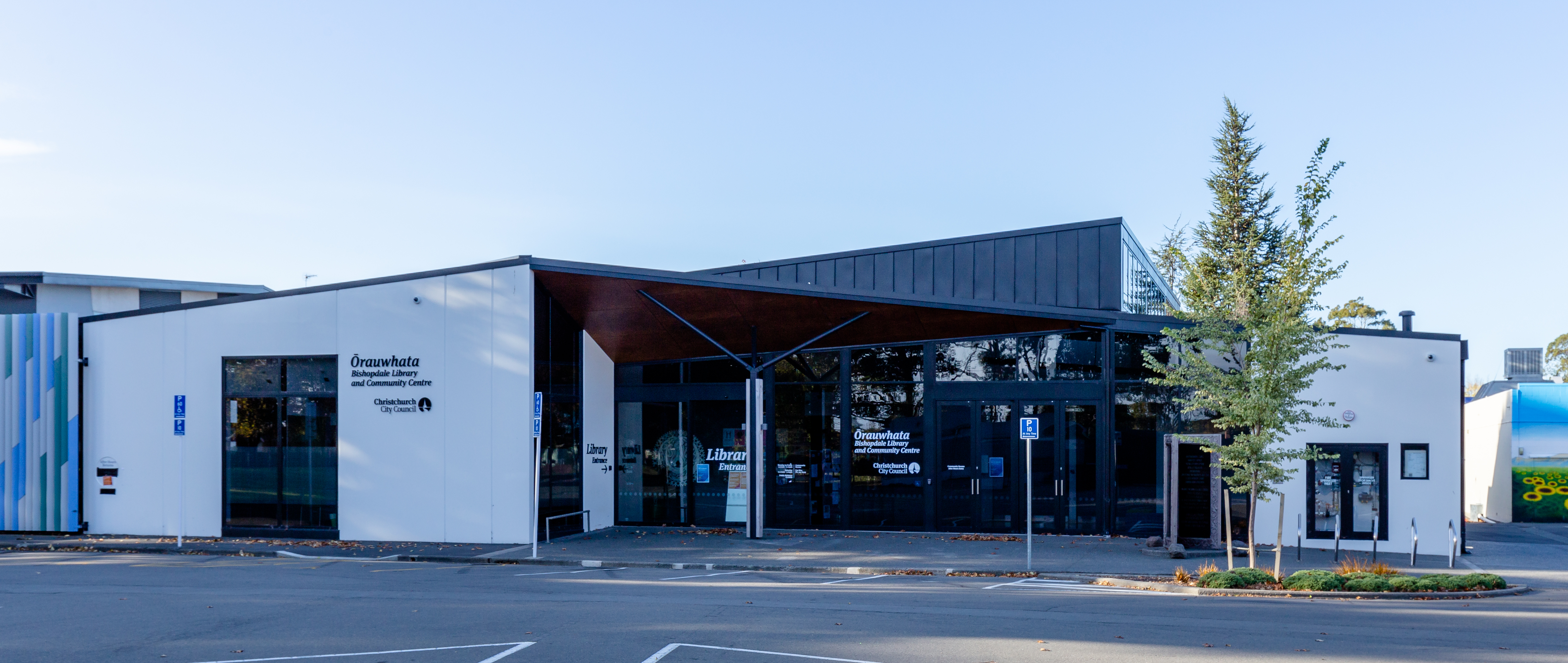
- Ōrauwhata Bishopdale Library and Community Centre
- Interactive map of Bishopdale
- Coordinates: 43.4890°S 172.5857°E
- Country: New Zealand
- City: Christchurch
- Local authority: Christchurch City Council
- Electoral ward: Harewood
- Community board: Waimāero Fendalton-Waimairi-Harewood

Area
  - Land: 320 ha (790 acres)

Population (June 2025)
  - Total: 9,710
  - Density: 3,000/km^{2} (7,900/sq mi)

		Casebrook
Harewood	Bishopdale	Northcote
Burnside	Bryndwr	Papanui

Bishopdale is a residential suburb located in the north of Christchurch, New Zealand.

Bishopdale lies close to Christchurch International Airport at Harewood and Christchurch's zoo, Orana Wildlife Park.

== History ==
The suburb takes its name from the three Bishop brothers, James (1826–1910), Robert (1827–1909) and William (1829–1903), who bought land in the area in 1858 or 1859 and established pipfruit orchards. Initially, the area was called "Bishopsdale", but the second 's' was dropped from the name. Part of Greers Road (the section between Harewood Road and Sawyers Arms Road) was formerly called Bishop's Road. It was renamed in 1948 to avoid confusion with Bishops Road in Papanui and Bishop Street in St Albans.

Much of the residental housing dates from the 1960s and decades following, and use either brick or wood, single-storey designs. The area boasts a lot of parks and recreational areas, and a small shopping mall.

== Demographics ==
Bishopdale, comprising the statistical areas of Bishopdale North, Bishopdale West and Bishopdale South, covers 3.20 km^{2} (1.24 sq mi). It had an estimated population of 9,710 as of June 2025, with a population density of 3,034 people per km^{2}.

Historical population
Year	Pop.	±% p.a.
2006	8,952	—
2013	9,054	+0.16%
2018	9,303	+0.54%
2023	9,285	−0.04%

Bishopdale had a population of 9,285 in the 2023 New Zealand census, a decrease of 18 people (−0.2%) since the 2018 census, and an increase of 231 people (2.6%) since the 2013 census. There were 4,548 males, 4,689 females, and 48 people of other genders in 3,555 dwellings. 3.7% of people identified as LGBTIQ+. The median age was 37.5 years (compared with 38.1 years nationally). There were 1,689 people (18.2%) aged under 15 years, 1,833 (19.7%) aged 15 to 29, 4,116 (44.3%) aged 30 to 64, and 1,644 (17.7%) aged 65 or older.

People could identify as more than one ethnicity. The results were 76.5% European (Pākehā); 11.0% Māori; 4.1% Pasifika; 16.4% Asian; 1.7% Middle Eastern, Latin American and African New Zealanders (MELAA); and 3.1% other, which includes people giving their ethnicity as "New Zealander". English was spoken by 95.4%, Māori by 2.0%, Samoan by 1.6%, and other languages by 15.4%. No language could be spoken by 2.3% (e.g. too young to talk). New Zealand Sign Language was known by 0.7%. The percentage of people born overseas was 24.5, compared with 28.8% nationally.

Religious affiliations were 33.7% Christian, 1.1% Hindu, 1.4% Islam, 0.2% Māori religious beliefs, 1.2% Buddhist, 0.3% New Age, 0.1% Jewish, and 1.6% other religions. People who answered that they had no religion were 53.5%, and 7.0% of people did not answer the census question.

Of those at least 15 years old, 1,833 (24.1%) people had a bachelor's or higher degree, 3,945 (51.9%) had a post-high school certificate or diploma, and 1,818 (23.9%) people exclusively held high school qualifications. The median income was $39,700, compared with $41,500 nationally. 600 people (7.9%) earned over $100,000 compared to 12.1% nationally. The employment status of those at least 15 was 3,864 (50.9%) full-time, 1,074 (14.1%) part-time, and 177 (2.3%) unemployed.

Individual statistical areas
Name	Area (km^{2})	Population	Density (per km^{2})	Dwellings	Median age	Median income
Bishopdale North	1.37	4,311	3,147	1,650	38.4 years	$39,900
Bishopdale West	1.13	2,793	2,472	1,095	37.7 years	$39,800
Bishopdale South	0.70	2,181	3,116	810	36.0 years	$39,100
New Zealand					38.1 years	$41,500

== Economy ==
=== Retail ===
Bishopdale Village Mall was established in Bishopdale in the 1960s. Bishopdale Mall was designed in the 1960s as a planned centre by the Ministry of Works, built around a central, pedestrianised and open air shopping area. One of the first major tenants was a Farmers co-operative store. The mall provided supermarket, doctor, post office, and general retail services to the growing suburb.

Currently, it has 600 carparks and 80 retailers, including a New World supermarket.

== Education ==
Breens Intermediate is an intermediate school catering for years 7 to 8. It has a roll of 171. The school, initially named Fendalton Intermediate, opened on 3 February 1976.

Bishopdale School, Cotswold Mātāhae School and Isleworth School are contributing primary schools catering for years 1 to 6. They have rolls of 171, 545 and 238, respectively. Bishopdale School opened in 1957, Cotswold in 1968 and Isleworth in 1962.

Emmanuel Christian School is a state-integrated interdenominational school for years 1 to 10. It has a roll of 287. It opened in 1987.

All these schools are coeducational, and all except Emmanuel Christian School are state schools. Rolls are as of July 2026.

== Religion ==
Bishopdale has a library and many churches, including Presbyterian, Jehovah's Witnesses and Catholic. Another place of worship in the suburb is a mosque located on Isleworth Road.

== In popular culture ==
Margaret Mahy has set her book The Changeover in Bishopdale; it is called Gardendale in that popular book, and production of a film of the same name began in 2016.
