= Designated Special Character schools =

Designated character schools were created under the Education Act 1989 of New Zealand, which allows the Minister of Education to establish two types of designated character schools under Sections 155 and 156 of the act. The Ministry of Education defined a designated character school as "a state school that has a particular character which sets it apart from ordinary state schools and kura kaupapa Māori. The only students who may enrol at a designated character school are those whose parents accept the particular character of the school."

== Section 155 schools ==
Kura kaupapa Māori are Māori-language immersion schools, where the principal language of instruction is Māori. They differ from the older kōhanga reo, which are immersion kindergartens.

- Te Kura o Waikare
- Nga Taiatea Wharekura
- Te Kura o Hirangi
- Te Kura o Torere
- Te Kura Toitu o Te Whaiti-nui-a-Toi
- Te Kura Kaupapa Motuhake o Tawhiuau
- Mana Tamariki
- Te Kura o Te Whakatupuranga Rua Mano
- Te Kura Maori o Porirua

In 2018, some of New Zealand's twelve approved partnership schools (a version of charter school) successfully applied to become designated character schools after the newly formed Labour-led coalition government set about removing legislation from the Education Act allowing for charter schools.

== Section 156 schools ==
These are identified as designated character schools, under Section 156. The special character of schools established under this section is not specified in the Act, and parents may propose any desirable special character as long as no other local school is already delivering an education reflecting the same special character.

- Ao Tawhiti
- Te Whanau o Tupuranga
