= Hoon Hay =

Suburb of Christchurch, New Zealand

- Suburb
- Interactive map of Hoon Hay
- Coordinates: 43°34′0″S 172°36′30″E
- Country: New Zealand
- City: Christchurch
- Local authority: Christchurch City Council
- Electoral ward: Spreydon; Cashmere
- Community board: Waipuna Halswell-Hornby-Riccarton; Waihoro Spreydon-Cashmere-Heathcote

Area
  - Land: 425 ha (1,050 acres)

Population (June 2025)
  - Total: 9,480
  - Density: 2,230/km^{2} (5,780/sq mi)

Hillmorton	Spreydon	Barrington
Aidanfield	Hoon Hay	Somerfield
Halswell	Westmorland	Cashmere

Hoon Hay is an outer suburb of Christchurch, New Zealand, located at the base of the Port Hills and about 5 kilometres (3.1 miles) southwest of Cathedral Square. The area was named by Captain Wickham Talbot Harvey, a captain of the British Royal 10th Hussars, who moved to the area in 1852 and named it after the farm in Hoon, Derbyshire where he grew up. Harvey only stayed in the area for four years, before a fire destroyed his property and prompted him to return to the United Kingdom. Further fires in the following years destroyed the woodland which was on the property, including several large tōtara, causing it to be converted into farmland. Remnants of this forest remain visible in the area, including with tree stumps being discovered during flood mitigation work on the Ōpāwaho / Heathcote River.

Hoon Hay maintains aspects of both a rural and suburban surrounding. It is bordered by the suburbs of Hillmorton and Spreydon to the north, Somerfield and Cashmere to the east and Halswell to the southwest, along with new developments in the adjacent Port Hills. Despite this, the suburb is also bordered by farmland and the nearby Hoon Hay valley, maintaining the suburb as semi-rural. The Cashmere Stream, a tributary of the Ōpāwaho / Heathcote River, that flows down the valley and through the suburb.

== Demographics ==
Hoon Hay covers 4.25 km^{2} (1.64 sq mi). It had an estimated population of 9,480 as of June 2025, with a population density of 2,231 people per km^{2}.

Historical population
Year	Pop.	±% p.a.
2006	8,211	—
2013	8,505	+0.50%
2018	8,754	+0.58%
2023	9,027	+0.62%
The 2006 population is for a smaller area of 3.70 km^{2}. Source:

Hoon Hay had a population of 9,027 in the 2023 New Zealand census, an increase of 273 people (3.1%) since the 2018 census, and an increase of 522 people (6.1%) since the 2013 census. There were 4,488 males, 4,503 females, and 36 people of other genders in 3,213 dwellings. 3.6% of people identified as LGBTIQ+. The median age was 35.3 years (compared with 38.1 years nationally). There were 1,869 people (20.7%) aged under 15 years, 1,767 (19.6%) aged 15 to 29, 4,143 (45.9%) aged 30 to 64, and 1,248 (13.8%) aged 65 or older.

People could identify as more than one ethnicity. The results were 77.9% European (Pākehā); 13.3% Māori; 7.9% Pasifika; 11.4% Asian; 1.5% Middle Eastern, Latin American and African New Zealanders (MELAA); and 2.2% other, which includes people giving their ethnicity as "New Zealander". English was spoken by 96.0%, Māori by 3.2%, Samoan by 3.1%, and other languages by 12.0%. No language could be spoken by 2.3% (e.g. too young to talk). New Zealand Sign Language was known by 0.8%. The percentage of people born overseas was 23.1, compared with 28.8% nationally.

Religious affiliations were 32.7% Christian, 1.6% Hindu, 1.1% Islam, 0.6% Māori religious beliefs, 0.6% Buddhist, 0.4% New Age, and 1.8% other religions. People who answered that they had no religion were 54.6%, and 6.6% of people did not answer the census question.

Of those at least 15 years old, 1,899 (26.5%) people had a bachelor's or higher degree, 3,564 (49.8%) had a post-high school certificate or diploma, and 1,695 (23.7%) people exclusively held high school qualifications. The median income was $43,400, compared with $41,500 nationally. 657 people (9.2%) earned over $100,000 compared to 12.1% nationally. The employment status of those at least 15 was 3,786 (52.9%) full-time, 1,017 (14.2%) part-time, and 177 (2.5%) unemployed.

Individual statistical areas
Name	Area (km^{2})	Population	Density (per km^{2})	Dwellings	Median age	Median income
Hoon Hay West	1.63	3,534	2,168	1,155	34.0 years	$37,300
Hoon Hay East	1.82	3,291	1,808	1,224	34.7 years	$48,600
Hoon Hay South	0.80	2,202	2,753	834	39.2 years	$47,000
New Zealand					38.1 years	$41,500

== Education ==
Hoon Hay Te Kura Kōaka and Te Kōmanawa Rowley School are state contributing primary schools for years 1 to 6. They have rolls of 443 and 227 students, respectively. Hoon Hay opened in 1959 and Rowley opened in 1973.

Our Lady of the Assumption School is a state-integrated full primary school for years 1 to 8. It has a roll of 327 students. It opened in 1957.

All these schools are coeducational. Rolls are as of July 2026.
