= Addington School =

New Zealand primary school

Addington Te Kura Taumatua

Location
- 22 Brougham Street, Addington, Christchurch 8024; 43°32′53.86″S 172°37′6.03″E

Information
- Type: State coed primary, years 1–6
- Established: 1881
- Ministry of Education Institution no.: 3271
- Principal: Donna Bilas
- Enrolment: 340 (July 2026)
- Website: www.addington.school.nz

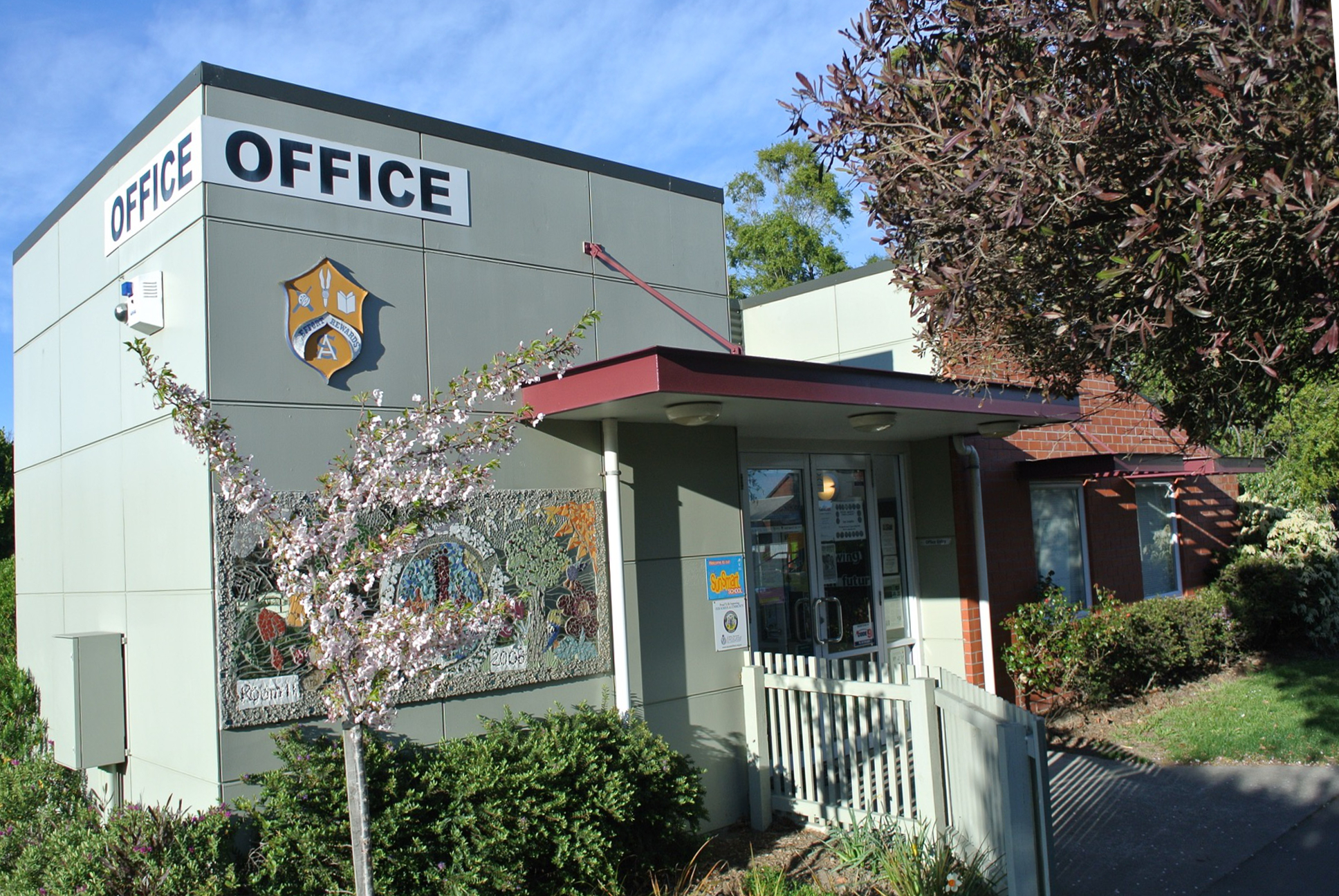
Pre-renovation school office at Addington School, Christchurch

Addington Te Kura Taumatua (formerly Addington School) is a primary school in the suburb of Addington, Christchurch, New Zealand. It is a year 1 to 6 school with a roll of approximately 230 children. The school runs a Conductive Education Unit for children with motor disorders.

== History ==
A school was opened in Addington in October 1881, as a side school to the overcrowded West Christchurch School. It was originally called West Christchurch Side School and had a roll of 253 pupils in five classes, with four teachers. By 1887 the roll had increased to 288 and it was decided that the school should become a main school. In 1892 the Addington School district was established, with the railway line as the boundary between it and West Christchurch district.

In 1893, when Addington School opened under its new name, the roll was 385 – 135 more than could be accommodated in the buildings. A new infant block was built during the year, and another building was rented. There was a headmaster, five teachers and four pupil-teachers. A swimming pool was built around 1903 and used by the Christchurch Amateur Swimming Club as well as the pupils of the school.

The Headmaster from 1893 to at least 1903 was Mr William Nixon Seay, who was born in Ireland in 1863.

The First Assistant Master in 1903 was Mr Hans Kennedy. He enjoyed many different sports such as cycling, cricket and rowing.

The Infant Mistress from 1893 to at least 1903 was Miss Mary Sisson Shirtcliffe. She had studied at West Christchurch School and then spent four years as a pupil-teacher at East Christchurch School. She then spent two years at the Normal Training College and was Infant Mistress at Ashburton before moving to Addington School.

In 1909 a fire destroyed much of the school and pupils were accommodated at West Christchurch and in marquees on the Addington grounds. The buildings were rebuilt and re-opened in February 1910.

In 1936, a group of former students formed the Old Students' Association. It operated until 1956, during which time it organised fundraising events to purchase books for the library and to fund the annual school picnic.

60th anniversary celebrations were held in 1941, 75th anniversary celebrations were held in 1956, and centennial celebrations were held in 1981.

As of 2025, the school had been gifted the name Te Kura Taumatua by local iwi and this is now used along with their original name.

== Notable people ==
=== Pupils ===
Adam Scott, a Christchurch violinist who performed with many orchestras in both New Zealand and Australia, attended Addington School and learned music there with Mona Neale. When Scott was 10 years old, Neale invited him to join a string orchestra with some of her other students.

Ali Ahmadi was commended for his work with the Addington Action Committee, formed to help local residents recover after the February 2011 Christchurch earthquake.

=== Staff ===
David Ching was the principal of Addington School for 17 years, during which time he established the Conductive Education Unit. He also served as a member, and later chairperson, of the NZ Foundation for Conductive Education. After his retirement from Addington in 2005 he continued to work for the Foundation as National Co-ordinator. In 2016 Ching received a Civic Award from the Mayor of Christchurch, Lianne Dalziel, in recognition of his dedication to primary education and sports.

== External sources ==
- Photo of first week of Addington School, 1925
- Newspaper article from The Press, 30 August 1907, describing a fund-raising fair for a new school library
- Addington School website
