= Christchurch South Intermediate =

State school in New Zealand

Christchurch South Intermediate School
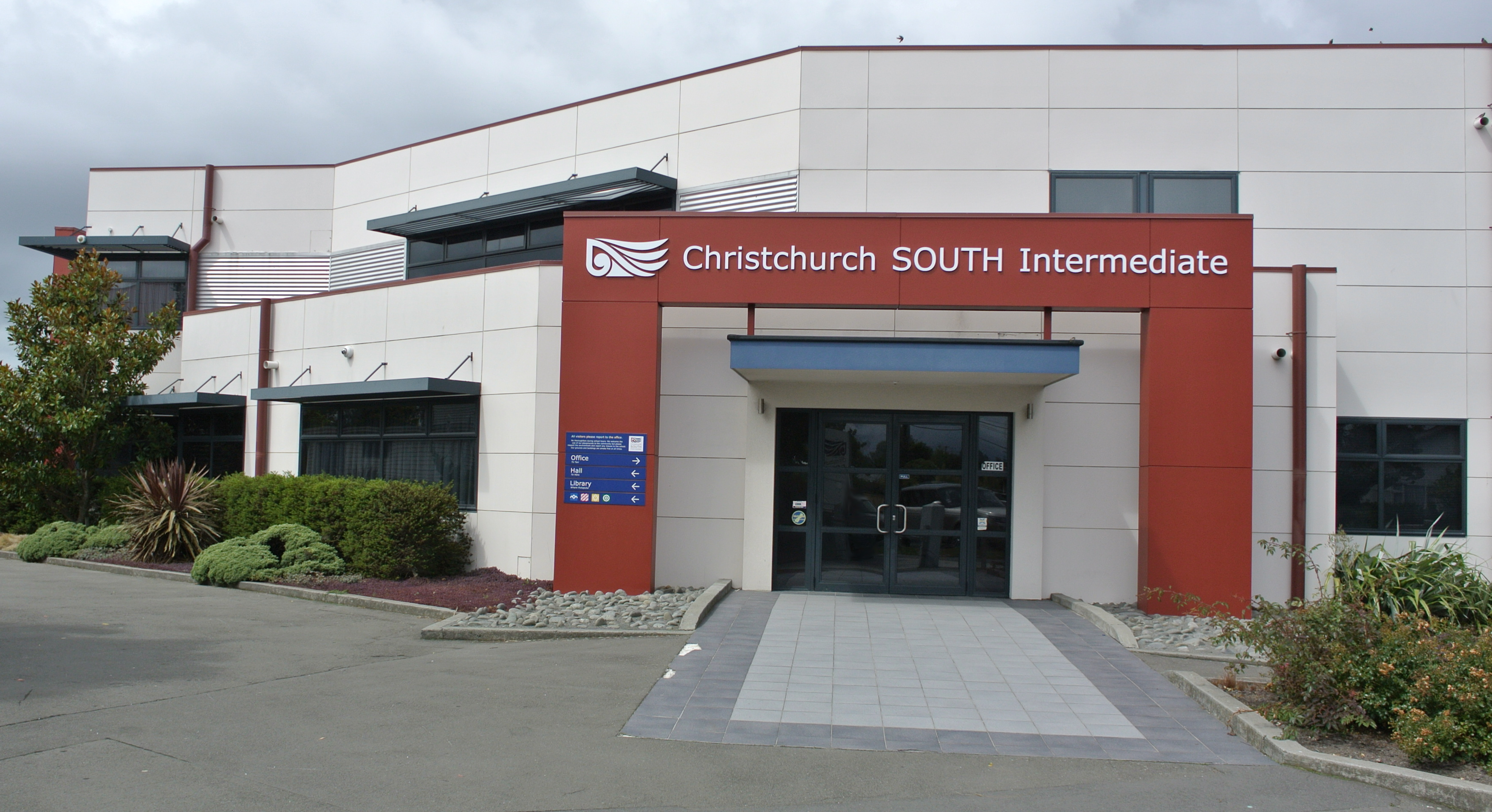

Location
- 204 Selwyn Street; Spreydon; Christchurch 8024; New Zealand; 43°33′05″S 172°37′34″E

Information
- Type: State co-ed intermediate
- Motto: Aim High
- Established: 1939
- Ministry of Education Institution no.: 3318
- Principal: Ross Hastings
- Enrolment: 489 (July 2026)
- Socio-economic decile: 6
- Website: chchsouth.ac.nz

Christchurch South Intermediate School is a school catering for students in Years 7 and 8 in Christchurch, New Zealand. Established in 1939, it is the second oldest intermediate school in the South Island and the third oldest in New Zealand. The school is located between the suburbs of Addington and Cashmere on what was the site of an old dairy farm and racing stables. It replaced the intermediate department of the Christchurch West High School in the 1930s. In 2012 work was completed replacing the old classrooms, which were built in 1939. These have been replaced with 4 'pods' consisting of 4 modern classrooms.

== Notable alumni ==
Bob Parker, broadcaster, politician, and the past Mayor of Christchurch, New Zealand
