= Westmorland, New Zealand =

Suburb of Christchurch, New Zealand

Westmorland
- Suburb
- Worsleys Rd
- Interactive map of Westmorland
- Coordinates: 43.58010°S 172.60263°E
- Country: New Zealand
- City: Christchurch
- Local authority: Christchurch City Council
- Electoral ward: Halswell; Cashmere
- Community board: Waihoro Spreydon-Cashmere-Heathcote; Waipuna Halswell-Hornby-Riccarton

Area
  - Land: 556 ha (1,370 acres)

Population (June 2025)
  - Total: 2,910
  - Density: 523/km^{2} (1,360/sq mi)

	Hoon Hay	Cashmere
Halswell	Westmorland
Kennedys Bush		(Port Hills)

Westmorland is an outer suburb of Christchurch, New Zealand. It is situated mostly on a hillside and is a recent development of the city, dating back to the 1970s.

== Demographics ==
Westmorland, which includes Cracroft, covers 5.56 km^{2} (2.15 sq mi). It had an estimated population of 2,910 as of June 2025, with a population density of 523 people per km^{2}.

Historical population
Year	Pop.	±% p.a.
2006	1,674	—
2013	1,932	+2.07%
2018	2,196	+2.59%
2023	2,661	+3.92%

Westmorland had a population of 2,661 in the 2023 New Zealand census, an increase of 465 people (21.2%) since the 2018 census, and an increase of 729 people (37.7%) since the 2013 census. There were 1,359 males, 1,290 females, and 15 people of other genders in 945 dwellings. 3.3% of people identified as LGBTIQ+. The median age was 46.4 years (compared with 38.1 years nationally). There were 429 people (16.1%) aged under 15 years, 441 (16.6%) aged 15 to 29, 1,311 (49.3%) aged 30 to 64, and 480 (18.0%) aged 65 or older.

People could identify as more than one ethnicity. The results were 88.6% European (Pākehā); 5.9% Māori; 1.2% Pasifika; 8.9% Asian; 0.6% Middle Eastern, Latin American and African New Zealanders (MELAA); and 4.3% other, which includes people giving their ethnicity as "New Zealander". English was spoken by 98.0%, Māori by 1.2%, Samoan by 0.1%, and other languages by 11.5%. No language could be spoken by 1.0% (e.g. too young to talk). New Zealand Sign Language was known by 0.7%. The percentage of people born overseas was 21.6, compared with 28.8% nationally.

Religious affiliations were 31.3% Christian, 0.8% Hindu, 0.7% Islam, 0.5% Buddhist, 0.3% New Age, 0.1% Jewish, and 1.7% other religions. People who answered that they had no religion were 59.2%, and 5.5% of people did not answer the census question.

Of those at least 15 years old, 888 (39.8%) people had a bachelor's or higher degree, 1,083 (48.5%) had a post-high school certificate or diploma, and 261 (11.7%) people exclusively held high school qualifications. The median income was $56,900, compared with $41,500 nationally. 573 people (25.7%) earned over $100,000 compared to 12.1% nationally. The employment status of those at least 15 was 1,179 (52.8%) full-time, 396 (17.7%) part-time, and 42 (1.9%) unemployed.
