= Addington, New Zealand =

Suburb of Christchurch, New Zealand

Addington
- Suburb
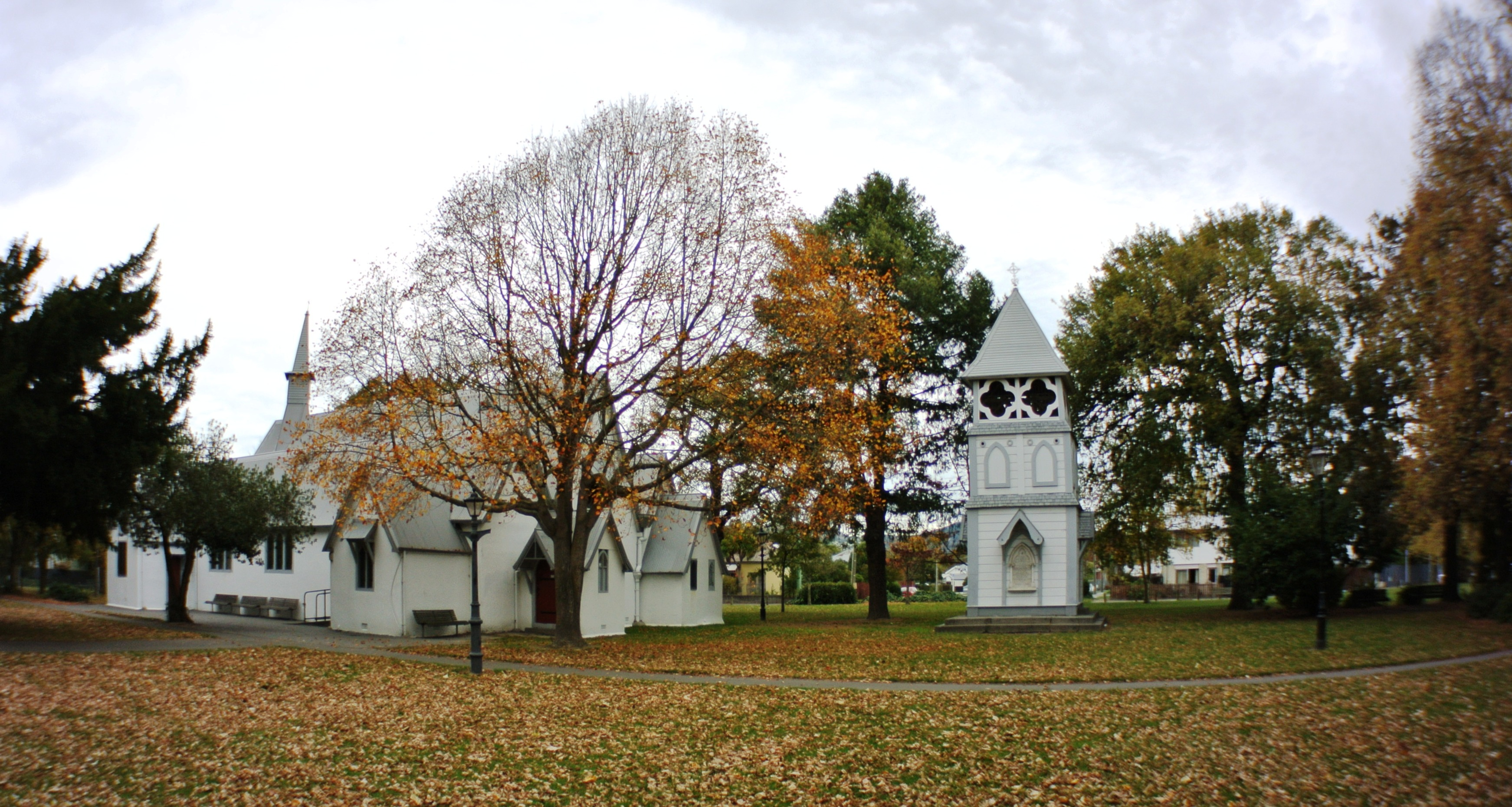
- St Mary's Anglican Church, a central landmark of Addington
- Interactive map of Addington
- Coordinates: 43.545°S 172.609°E
- Country: New Zealand
- City: Christchurch
- Local authority: Christchurch City Council
- Electoral ward: Riccarton; Central
- Community board: Waipuna Halswell-Hornby-Riccarton; Waihoro Spreydon-Cashmere-Heathcote
- Established: 1860

Area
  - Land: 263 ha (650 acres)

Population (June 2025)
  - Total: 6,330
  - Density: 2,410/km^{2} (6,230/sq mi)
- Postcode: 8041

Upper Riccarton	Riccarton	Christchurch Central City
Middleton	Addington	Sydenham
Hillmorton	Spreydon

Addington is a suburb of Christchurch, New Zealand. It is sited 2.5 kilometres (1.6 mi) south-west of the city centre.

As an inner city suburb, Addington has a mix of residential, retail and light industrial properties.

== Geography ==
Addington is sited between the suburbs of Spreydon and Riccarton, with Blenheim Road providing the boundary to Riccarton. The cluster of the shops in the suburb of Spreydon also provide a clear boundary between the suburbs. To the east of the suburb is Sydenham and to the west is Middleton.

== History ==
=== 19th century ===
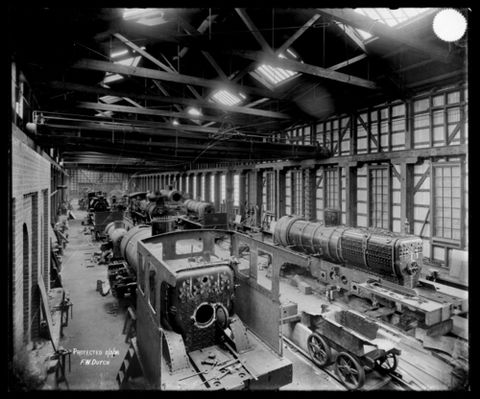
Addington Railway Workshops, 2 May 1898

For the first decade after the founding of Christchurch in 1850, Addington was farmland, consisting of large rural sections. In the early 1860s the railway was surveyed through the area and subdivision of the larger sections began. Factories moved in; wool and grain sheds opened; and with the industry came residential development for workers.

Development continued throughout the 19th century. The city's sale yards opened in 1874 and the railway workshops were moved to Addington in 1880. By the time the show grounds were opened in 1887, Addington had become an important suburb in the industrial and social life of Christchurch. In 1874 the Addington Prison was built under the guidance of Benjamin Mountfort in Lincoln Road. The prison closed in 1999 and the Mountfort cell block and remaining perimeter walls are a Heritage New Zealand Historic Place Category 2 and is now a hostel.

The suburb was named for the country residence of Archbishop John Sumner, one of the leading members of the Canterbury Association, and who was buried in St Mary's Church, Addington in England.

=== 20th century ===
The New Zealand Railways Department's Addington Workshops were situated in Addington until their closure in the 1990s. The historic concrete water-tower is the only remnant of the workshops. The tower has served as the centrepoint for the Tower Junction shopping complex.

A new Christchurch railway station at Addington opened in 1994 to replace the former station on Moorhouse Avenue. The station mainly serves the TranzAlpine which carries passengers on the 223-kilometre (139 mi) coast-to-coast journey from Christchurch to Greymouth.

Addington was the home of the oldest blending plant in the Southern Hemisphere until it was demolished after sustaining some damage in the February 2011 Christchurch earthquake. The demolition of the plant sparked some controversy as the plant had been lined up to be carefully taken apart in an attempt to save Oregon timber valued at over $600,000.

== Demographics ==
Addington comprises four statistical areas. Addington North is primarily industrial, with the Main South Line running through it. Addington West and Addington East are residential. Tower Junction has a shopping centre, Addington Racecourse, and light industrial premises, and also includes two rest homes, which result in an unusually high median age for residents.

Individual statistical areas
Name	Area (km^{2})	Population	Density (per km^{2})	Dwellings	Median age	Median income
Addington North	0.43	24	56	9	28.3 years	$54,700
Addington West	0.55	2,505	4,555	924	35.0 years	$38,900
Addington East	0.57	3,003	5,268	1,305	32.1 years	$40,100
Tower Junction	1.08	162	150	63	81.3 years	$28,700
New Zealand					38.1 years	$41,500

=== Residential areas ===
The residential areas of Addington, comprising the statistical areas of Addington West and Addington East cover 1.12 km^{2} (0.43 sq mi). They had an estimated population of 6,040 as of June 2025, with a population density of 5,393 people per km^{2}.

Historical population for residential areas
Year	Pop.	±% p.a.
2006	4,287	—
2013	5,031	+2.31%
2018	5,346	+1.22%
2023	5,508	+0.60%

The residential areas had a population of 5,508 in the 2023 New Zealand census, an increase of 162 people (3.0%) since the 2018 census, and an increase of 477 people (9.5%) since the 2013 census. There were 2,856 males, 2,601 females, and 57 people of other genders in 2,229 dwellings. 8.2% of people identified as LGBTIQ+. There were 681 people (12.4%) aged under 15 years, 1,581 (28.7%) aged 15 to 29, 2,580 (46.8%) aged 30 to 64, and 666 (12.1%) aged 65 or older.

People could identify as more than one ethnicity. The results were 60.6% European (Pākehā); 12.1% Māori; 4.9% Pasifika; 29.7% Asian; 3.2% Middle Eastern, Latin American and African New Zealanders (MELAA); and 2.0% other, which includes people giving their ethnicity as "New Zealander". English was spoken by 95.0%, Māori by 3.1%, Samoan by 1.7%, and other languages by 23.4%. No language could be spoken by 2.7% (e.g. too young to talk). New Zealand Sign Language was known by 0.7%. The percentage of people born overseas was 38.5, compared with 28.8% nationally.

Religious affiliations were 34.5% Christian, 3.9% Hindu, 2.3% Islam, 0.5% Māori religious beliefs, 1.6% Buddhist, 0.4% New Age, 0.1% Jewish, and 3.5% other religions. People who answered that they had no religion were 46.8%, and 6.6% of people did not answer the census question.

Of those at least 15 years old, 1,515 (31.4%) people had a bachelor's or higher degree, 2,034 (42.1%) had a post-high school certificate or diploma, and 1,281 (26.5%) people exclusively held high school qualifications. 246 people (5.1%) earned over $100,000 compared to 12.1% nationally. The employment status of those at least 15 was 2,646 (54.8%) full-time, 507 (10.5%) part-time, and 186 (3.9%) unemployed.

=== Addington North ===
Addington North covers 0.43 km^{2} (0.17 sq mi). It had an estimated population of 110 as of June 2025, with a population density of 256 people per km^{2}.

Historical population
Year	Pop.	±% p.a.
2013	57	—
2018	12	−26.77%
2023	24	+14.87%

Addington North had a population of 24 in the 2023 New Zealand census, an increase of 12 people (100.0%) since the 2018 census, and a decrease of 33 people (−57.9%) since the 2013 census. There were 15 males and 9 females in 9 dwellings. The median age was 28.3 years (compared with 38.1 years nationally). There were 3 people (12.5%) aged under 15 years, 12 (50.0%) aged 15 to 29, and 9 (37.5%) aged 30 to 64.

People could identify as more than one ethnicity. The results were 37.5% European (Pākehā), 12.5% Māori, and 50.0% Asian. English was spoken by 100.0%, and other languages by 62.5%. The percentage of people born overseas was 62.5, compared with 28.8% nationally.

Religious affiliations were 37.5% Christian, and 12.5% Islam. People who answered that they had no religion were 37.5%, and 12.5% of people did not answer the census question.

The median income was $54,700, compared with $41,500 nationally. The employment status of those at least 15 was 15 (71.4%) full-time.

=== Tower Junction ===
Tower Junction covers 1.08 km^{2} (0.42 sq mi). It had an estimated population of 180 as of June 2025, with a population density of 167 people per km^{2}.

Historical population for Tower Junction
Year	Pop.	±% p.a.
2006	24	—
2013	39	+7.18%
2018	120	+25.21%
2023	162	+6.19%

Tower Junction had a population of 162 in the 2023 New Zealand census, an increase of 42 people (35.0%) since the 2018 census, and an increase of 123 people (315.4%) since the 2013 census. There were 63 males, 99 females, and 3 people of other genders in 63 dwellings. 1.9% of people identified as LGBTIQ+. The median age was 81.3 years (compared with 38.1 years nationally). There were 9 people (5.6%) aged 15 to 29, 15 (9.3%) aged 30 to 64, and 135 (83.3%) aged 65 or older.

People could identify as more than one ethnicity. The results were 88.9% European (Pākehā), 1.9% Māori, 1.9% Pasifika, 5.6% Asian, and 3.7% other, which includes people giving their ethnicity as "New Zealander". English was spoken by 96.3%, Māori by 1.9%, and other languages by 7.4%. The percentage of people born overseas was 22.2, compared with 28.8% nationally.

Religious affiliations were 57.4% Christian, 1.9% Islam, and 1.9% other religions. People who answered that they had no religion were 29.6%, and 7.4% of people did not answer the census question.

Of those at least 15 years old, 27 (16.7%) people had a bachelor's or higher degree, 66 (40.7%) had a post-high school certificate or diploma, and 66 (40.7%) people exclusively held high school qualifications. The median income was $28,700, compared with $41,500 nationally. 3 people (1.9%) earned over $100,000 compared to 12.1% nationally. The employment status of those at least 15 was 21 (13.0%) full-time, 3 (1.9%) part-time, and 3 (1.9%) unemployed.

== Economy ==
Tower Junction shopping centre is located in Addington, owned by Ngāi Tahu. It opened in 2002, and was redeveloped in 2018. It covers 37,000 m^{2} and has 40 tenants, including Toyworld, Bunnings and Harvey Norman.

== Features ==
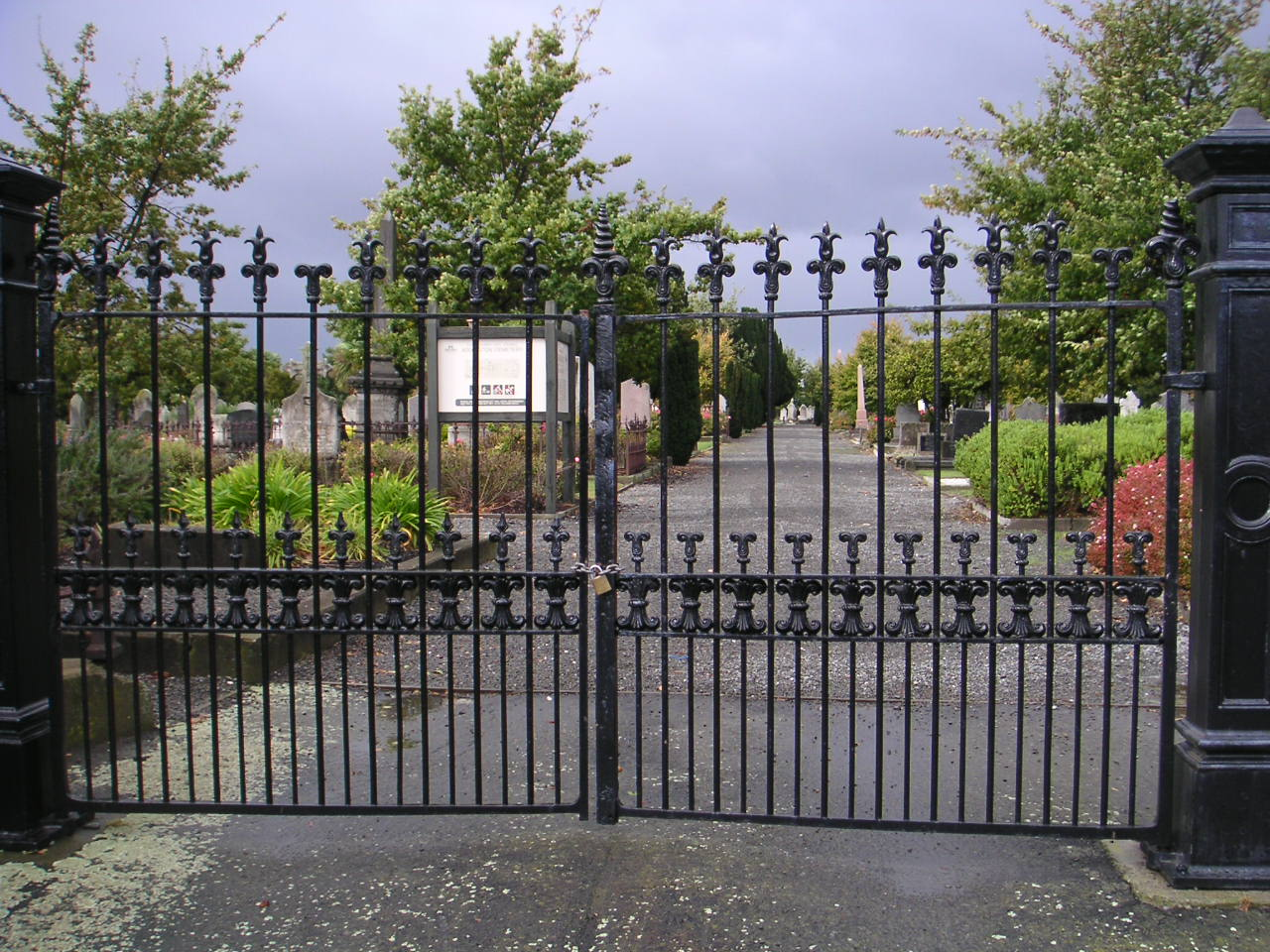
Addington Cemetery

The suburb is home to multiple sporting and events complexes, including Horncastle Arena, Rugby League Park (currently branded as Orangetheory Stadium), and Addington Raceway. Along with Riccarton Racecourse, the Raceway is one of Christchurch's primary horse-racing venues, focusing predominantly on harness racing, and is the home to the annual New Zealand Trotting Cup. Addington is also close to many other event venues, notably Hagley Park to the north and the Canterbury Agricultural Park to the southwest.

Central to Addington's residential area is St Mary's Anglican Church, which is a historic building surrounded by the spacious grounds and trees of Church Square. The grounds are used by the community for galas, pancake races (on Shrove Tuesday) fairs and weddings. The buildings and surrounding area is registered by Heritage New Zealand as a historic area, with registration number 7516.

Addington was also formerly home to an immigration barrack.

The Court Theatre, whose buildings were damaged in the earthquake, relocated to "The Shed" and started operating in 2011.

Manuka Cottage is a community house that serves the interests of a wide variety of people and local community groups.

== Education ==
Addington School is sited in the south–west corner of the suburb where the boundary with Spreydon is not clearly defined. It is a contributing primary school for years 1 to 6. It has a roll of 340 students. The school opened in 1881 as West Christchurch Side School. The original building was built from timber and burnt down in 1909.

Sacred Heart School is a Catholic state-integrated full primary school for years 1 to 8. It has a roll of 185 students. Sacred Heart opened in 1877.

== Works cited ==
- Wilson, John (2005), Contextual Historical Overview of Christchurch City (PDF) (report), Christchurch: Christchurch City Council, ISBN 9781877313219, OCLC 156459064, archived (PDF) from the original on 1 February 2023 – via Canterbury Earthquakes Royal Commission
- Wilson, John (2018). Local Lives: A History of Addington. Addington, Christchurch New Zealand. ISBN 9780473413231.
