= Spreydon =

Suburb of Christchurch, New Zealand

- Suburb
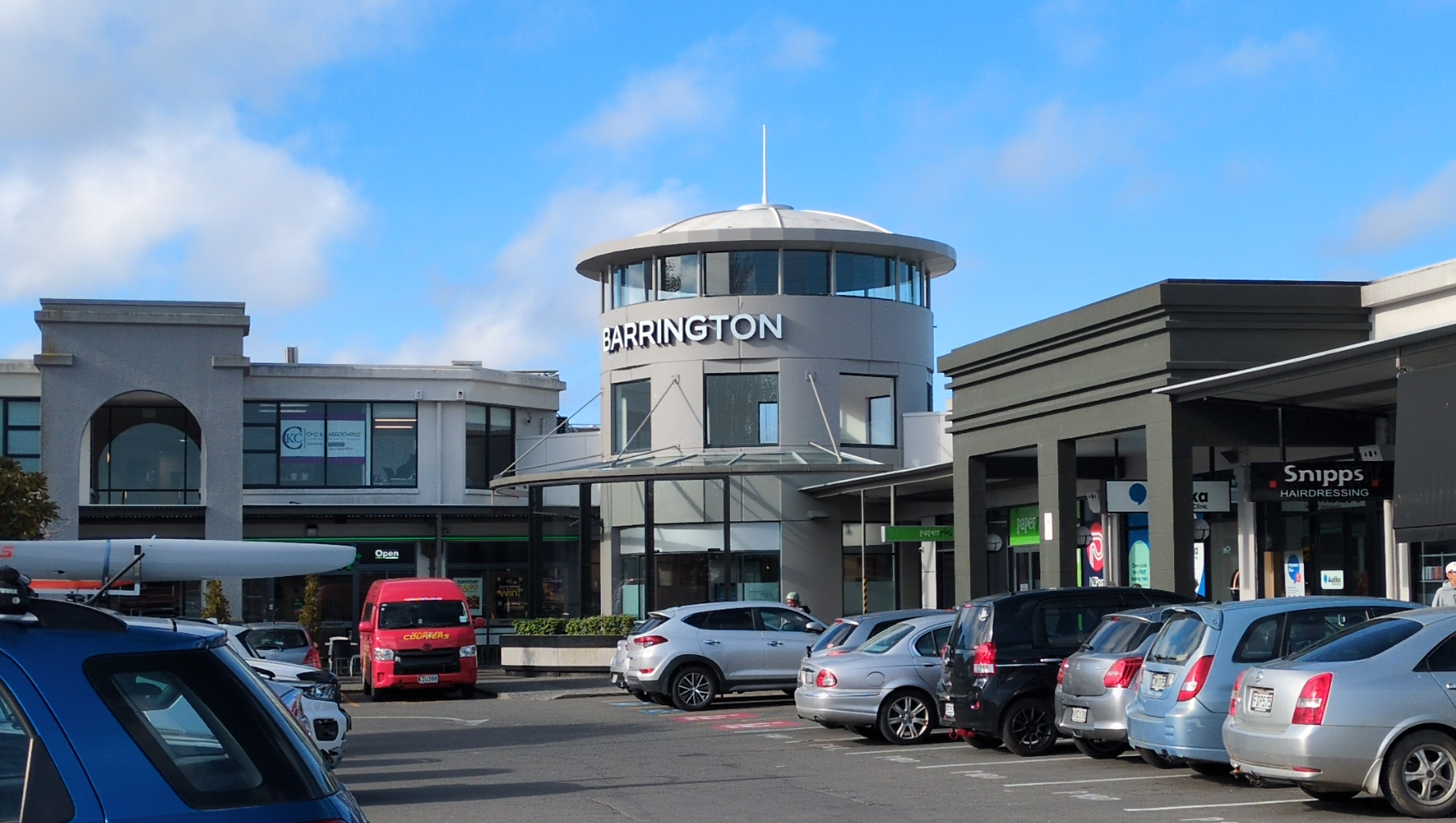
- Barrington Shopping Centre Entrance in 2025
- Interactive map of Spreydon
- Coordinates: 43°34′S 172°37′E
- Country: New Zealand
- City: Christchurch
- Local authority: Christchurch City Council
- Electoral ward: Spreydon
- Community board: Waihoro Spreydon-Cashmere-Heathcote

Area
  - Land: 296 ha (730 acres)

Population (June 2025)
  - Total: 9,970
  - Density: 3,370/km^{2} (8,720/sq mi)

	Addington
Hillmorton	Spreydon	Sydenham
Halswell	Hoon Hay	Barrington

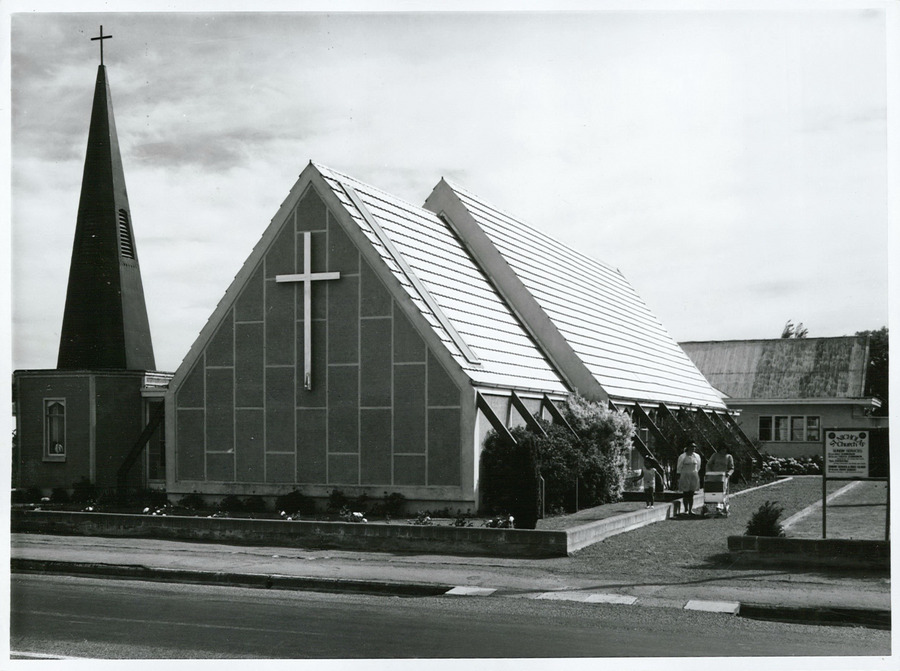
St Nicholas Anglican Church

Spreydon is a suburb of Christchurch, New Zealand, 4 kilometres (2.5 mi) south-south-west of Cathedral Square. The most central street through Spreydon is Barrington Street. Spreydon is flanked by the suburbs Hoon Hay, Sydenham, and Lower Cashmere. State Highway 76 marks the northern boundary of the suburb, including the eastern end of the Christchurch Southern Motorway.

The area previously had a small Māori settlement named Ōmōkihi. The area was first settled by Europeans in 1853. Spreydon was constituted as a borough in 1911. It merged into the city of Christchurch in 1921.

== History ==
Prior to European settlement, the area occupying modern-day Spreydon was called Wai Mōkihi and there was a small settlement (pā) here was known as Ōmōkihi. Spreydon area was predominantly swampland connected to the nearby Ōpāwaho / Heathcote River, interspersed with fields of tussock. There is also evidence of this area having Māori human remains.

The area was first settled by Europeans in 1853 when 300 acres of land bordering Lincoln Road were purchased by Augustus Moore, who gave it the name Spreydon Farm. The origins of this name are disputed, with some claiming it refers to family land in Ireland and others that it is named after a place in Devon known to Moore. Moore farmed the land and ran a brewery and tavern, known as the Spreydon Arms, on his land along Lincoln Road until 1865, when he sold his property to William Sefton Moorhouse. A baptist church was soon established in the area, built out of a former sod house on land donated by a neighbouring farmer by Thomas Jefcoate. The church's congregation steadily grew as more people settled the area, and continues to operate to this day.

In 1911, the area was constituted as a borough with its own council to reflect the growing population of the area. By this point, the former property had been heavily subdivided with several large roads through the area. The borough continued for roughly a decade, before it was incorporated into the larger Christchurch City Council in 1921.

== Demographics ==
Spreydon covers 2.96 km^{2} (1.14 sq mi). It had an estimated population of 9,970 as of June 2025, with a population density of 3,368 people per km^{2}.

Historical population
Year	Pop.	±% p.a.
2006	8,499	—
2013	8,721	+0.37%
2018	9,210	+1.10%
2023	9,270	+0.13%

Spreydon had a population of 9,270 in the 2023 New Zealand census, an increase of 60 people (0.7%) since the 2018 census, and an increase of 549 people (6.3%) since the 2013 census. There were 4,470 males, 4,737 females, and 63 people of other genders in 3,861 dwellings. 5.7% of people identified as LGBTIQ+. The median age was 35.9 years (compared with 38.1 years nationally). There were 1,509 people (16.3%) aged under 15 years, 1,992 (21.5%) aged 15 to 29, 4,509 (48.6%) aged 30 to 64, and 1,257 (13.6%) aged 65 or older.

People could identify as more than one ethnicity. The results were 79.0% European (Pākehā); 12.5% Māori; 3.6% Pasifika; 14.1% Asian; 2.5% Middle Eastern, Latin American and African New Zealanders (MELAA); and 2.3% other, which includes people giving their ethnicity as "New Zealander". English was spoken by 95.7%, Māori by 2.5%, Samoan by 0.9%, and other languages by 15.0%. No language could be spoken by 2.6% (e.g. too young to talk). New Zealand Sign Language was known by 0.8%. The percentage of people born overseas was 25.3, compared with 28.8% nationally.

Religious affiliations were 31.0% Christian, 2.0% Hindu, 1.3% Islam, 0.3% Māori religious beliefs, 0.7% Buddhist, 0.6% New Age, 0.1% Jewish, and 2.1% other religions. People who answered that they had no religion were 55.3%, and 6.7% of people did not answer the census question.

Of those at least 15 years old, 2,298 (29.6%) people had a bachelor's or higher degree, 3,666 (47.2%) had a post-high school certificate or diploma, and 1,794 (23.1%) people exclusively held high school qualifications. The median income was $42,000, compared with $41,500 nationally. 654 people (8.4%) earned over $100,000 compared to 12.1% nationally. The employment status of those at least 15 was 4,167 (53.7%) full-time, 984 (12.7%) part-time, and 210 (2.7%) unemployed.

Individual statistical areas
Name	Area (km^{2})	Population	Density (per km^{2})	Dwellings	Median age	Median income
Spreydon West	1.03	3,072	2,983	1,275	35.8 years	$44,300
Spreydon North	1.21	3,762	3,109	1,548	34.7 years	$42,000
Spreydon South	0.72	2,439	3,388	1,035	38.7 years	$38,800
New Zealand					38.1 years	$41,500

== Facilities ==
- Barrington Shopping Centre, Redeveloped in 2012 houses many shops including a supermarket, pharmacy, The Warehouse, banks and a post office.
- Pioneer Leisure Centre, opened in 1978, is a council-owned and operated centre with swimming pools, an indoor sports stadium and a fitness centre.

== Education ==
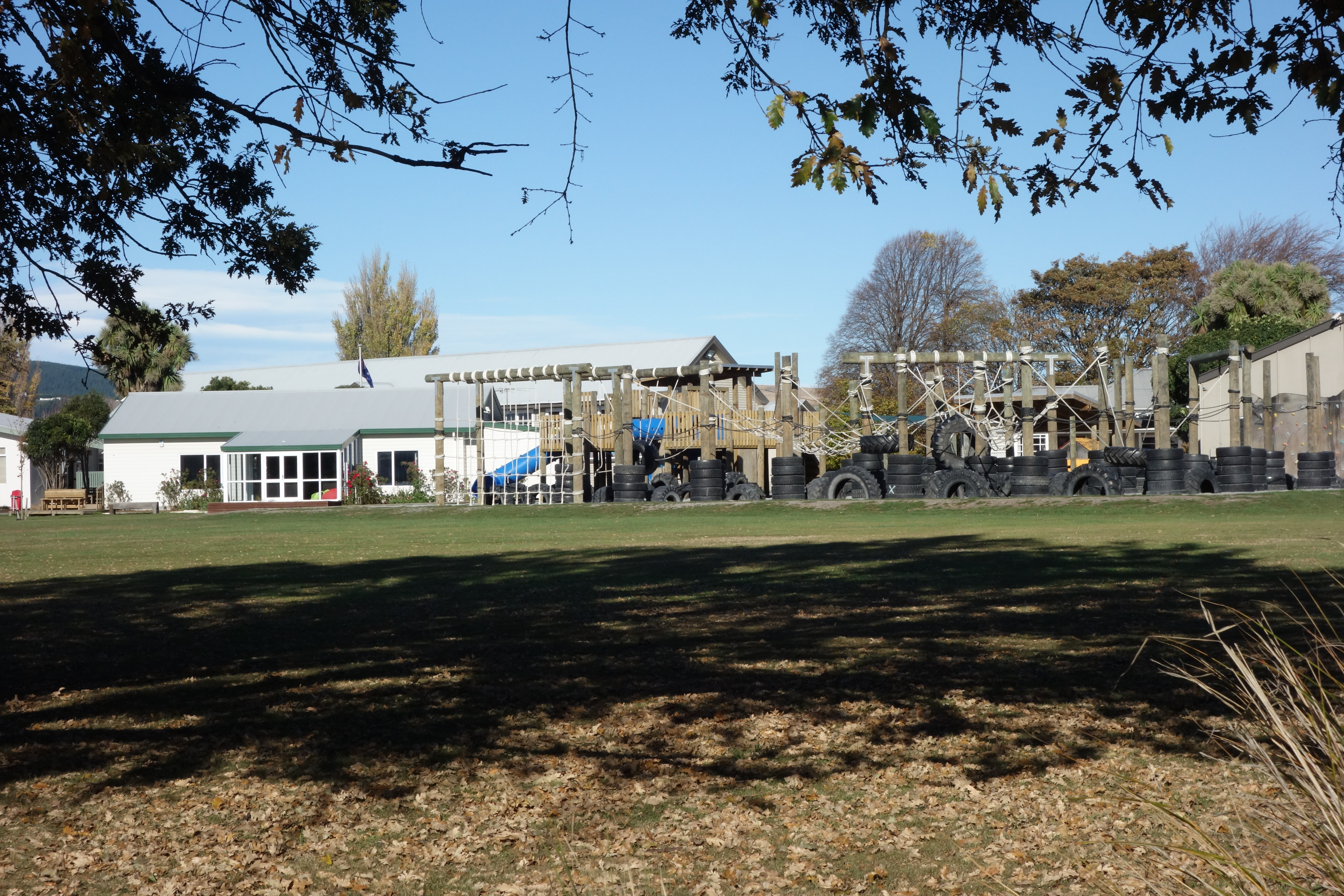
Te Ara Koropiko West Spreydon School

Christchurch South Karamata Intermediate School is an intermediate school for years 7 to 8 with a roll of 489 students. It opened in 1939.

Te Kura o Mōkihi Spreydon School and Te Ara Koropiko West Spreydon School are contributing primary schools for years 1 to 6 with rolls of 279 and 271 students, respectively. Te Kura o Mōkihi Spreydon School opened as Upper Heathcote School in 1865 and Te Ara Koropiko West Spreydon School opened in 1926.

Te Kura Kaupapa Māori o Te Whānau Tahi is a composite school for years 1 to 15 teaching entirely in the Māori language. It has a roll of 230 students. It started in 1989.

All of these are coeducational state schools. Rolls are as of July 2026.
