= Hillmorton, New Zealand =

Suburb of Christchurch, New Zealand

Hillmorton
- Suburb
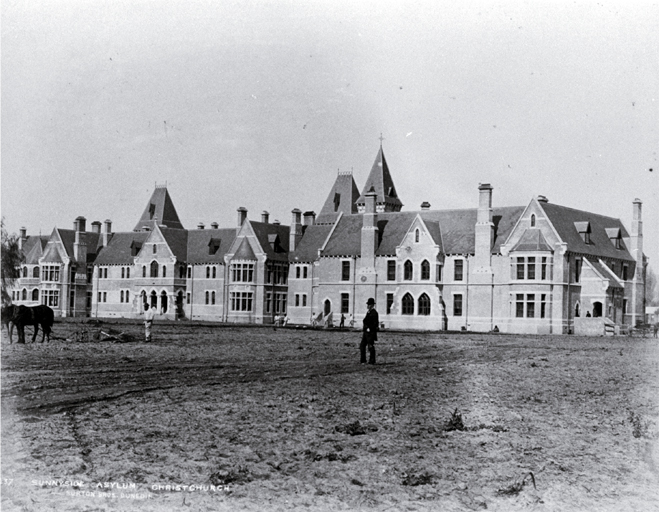
- Sunnyside Hospital, once the best-known institution of Hillmorton
- Interactive map of Hillmorton
- Coordinates: 43.555231°S 172.591994°E
- Country: New Zealand
- City: Christchurch
- Local authority: Christchurch City Council
- Electoral ward: Halswell; Spreydon
- Community board: Waipuna Halswell-Hornby-Riccarton; Waihoro Spreydon-Cashmere-Heathcote

Area
  - Land: 292 ha (720 acres)

Population (June 2025)
  - Total: 3,020
  - Density: 1,030/km^{2} (2,680/sq mi)
- Hospitals: Hillmorton Hospital

	Middleton	Addington
Wigram	Hillmorton	Spreydon
Aidanfield		Hoon Hay

Hillmorton is a suburb of south-western Christchurch, New Zealand. The suburb is centred around the intersection of Lincoln Road and Hoon Hay Road, two arterial routes which form part of State Highway 75 and feed into the Christchurch Southern Motorway which runs to the north of the suburb.

== History ==
Hillmorton takes its name from Hill Morton Farm, the property of John Twigger, who settled in the area in 1863. Land from the subdivision of this farm was advertised for sale in a local newspaper in 1879 as being "part of Twigger's property known as Hillmorton". At the same time as Twigger settled the area, 1863 also saw the opening of the Sunnyside Hospital, Christchurch's first mental asylum. The buildings were constructed in a gothic style by architect John Campbell, and represented a shift in the approach to mental illness in the region. Where previously those with mental illnesses were held at Lyttelton Gaol, the hospital was founded on the principles of moral management, providing a more supportive environment for patients. Commitment to this approach varied throughout the hospital's existence, until it was closed in 1999 due to replacement by the neighbouring Hillmorton Hospital. The final buildings of the former Sunnyside Hospital were demolished in April 2007 to make way for additional housing, a move which was met with protest due to the architectural and cultural significance of the structures. Hillmorton Hospital continues to act as a dedicated mental health facility for the city from nearby to the original Sunnyside location.

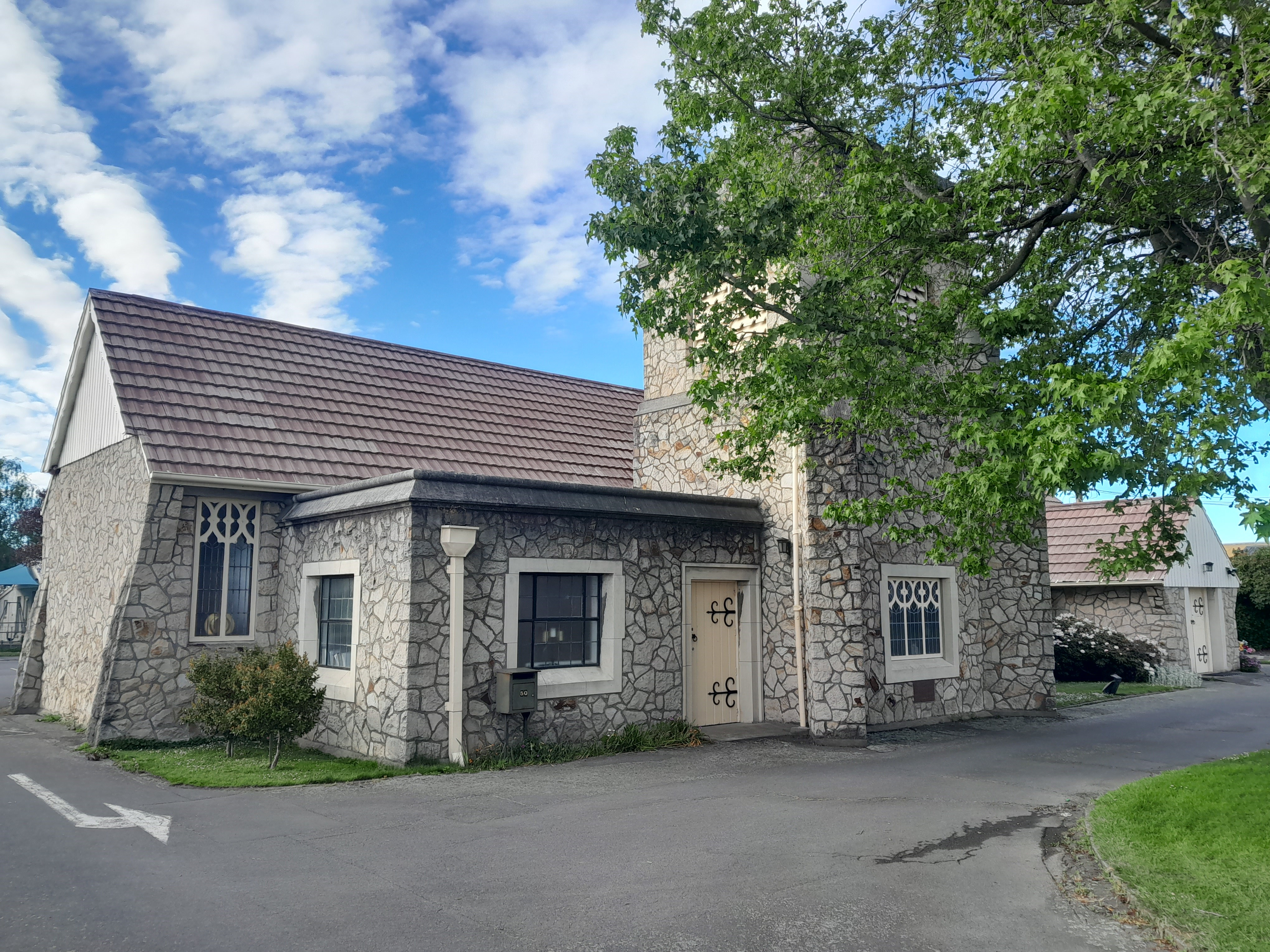
St Martin's Anglican Church, Hillmorton, Christchurch

In 1933, Hillmorton was also chosen as the site for a Carmelite monastery to be established as the order's first New Zealand presence. The monastery was originally founded in a pre-existing homestead in June 1933, with the first wing not being completed until four years later. This was followed by the addition of a subsequent wing in 1950, since which point the monastery has maintained their presence in the heart of Hillmorton.

== Geography ==
The Heathcote River (Ōpāwaho) River flows along the northern boundary of Hillmorton which along with Curletts Road is the boundary with Wigram. Hillmorton also borders several other suburbs:

Aidanfield West of Templetons Road. (properties on Templetons Road are part of Hillmorton)

Hoon Hay South of Halswell Road, except Coppell Place which is part of Hillmorton (properties on this section of Halswell Road are part of Hillmorton)

Spreydon South of Lincoln Road (properties on this section of Lincoln Road are part of Hillmorton)

Addington West of Wrights Road (properties on Wrights Road are not part of Hillmorton)

Middleton to the North, separated by the Christchurch Southern Motorway

== Demographics ==
Hillmorton covers 2.92 km^{2} (1.13 sq mi). It had an estimated population of 3,020 as of June 2025, with a population density of 1,034 people per km^{2}.

Historical population
Year	Pop.	±% p.a.
2006	2,160	—
2013	2,655	+2.99%
2018	2,838	+1.34%
2023	2,847	+0.06%

Hillmorton had a population of 2,847 in the 2023 New Zealand census, an increase of 9 people (0.3%) since the 2018 census, and an increase of 192 people (7.2%) since the 2013 census. There were 1,431 males, 1,410 females, and 6 people of other genders in 1,110 dwellings. 4.5% of people identified as LGBTIQ+. The median age was 38.3 years (compared with 38.1 years nationally). There were 465 people (16.3%) aged under 15 years, 552 (19.4%) aged 15 to 29, 1,326 (46.6%) aged 30 to 64, and 507 (17.8%) aged 65 or older.

People could identify as more than one ethnicity. The results were 74.2% European (Pākehā); 10.0% Māori; 5.1% Pasifika; 19.4% Asian; 1.4% Middle Eastern, Latin American and African New Zealanders (MELAA); and 3.1% other, which includes people giving their ethnicity as "New Zealander". English was spoken by 95.5%, Māori by 2.3%, Samoan by 1.6%, and other languages by 17.4%. No language could be spoken by 2.1% (e.g. too young to talk). New Zealand Sign Language was known by 0.7%. The percentage of people born overseas was 29.0, compared with 28.8% nationally.

Religious affiliations were 34.8% Christian, 2.0% Hindu, 1.5% Islam, 0.4% Māori religious beliefs, 0.7% Buddhist, 0.6% New Age, and 2.0% other religions. People who answered that they had no religion were 51.5%, and 6.6% of people did not answer the census question.

Of those at least 15 years old, 660 (27.7%) people had a bachelor's or higher degree, 1,152 (48.4%) had a post-high school certificate or diploma, and 573 (24.1%) people exclusively held high school qualifications. The median income was $42,500, compared with $41,500 nationally. 243 people (10.2%) earned over $100,000 compared to 12.1% nationally. The employment status of those at least 15 was 1,248 (52.4%) full-time, 327 (13.7%) part-time, and 66 (2.8%) unemployed.

== Education ==
Hillmorton High School is a secondary school catering for years 7 to 13. It had a roll of 1,430 as of July 2026. The school opened in 1961 as Hoon Hay Post Primary School.

Southern Regional Health School is a special school. It had a roll of 20 as of July 2026. It provides education for children throughout the South Island who are too ill to attend a regular school. The school opened in 2000.
