= Cecil Wood (architect) =

New Zealand architect (1878–1947)

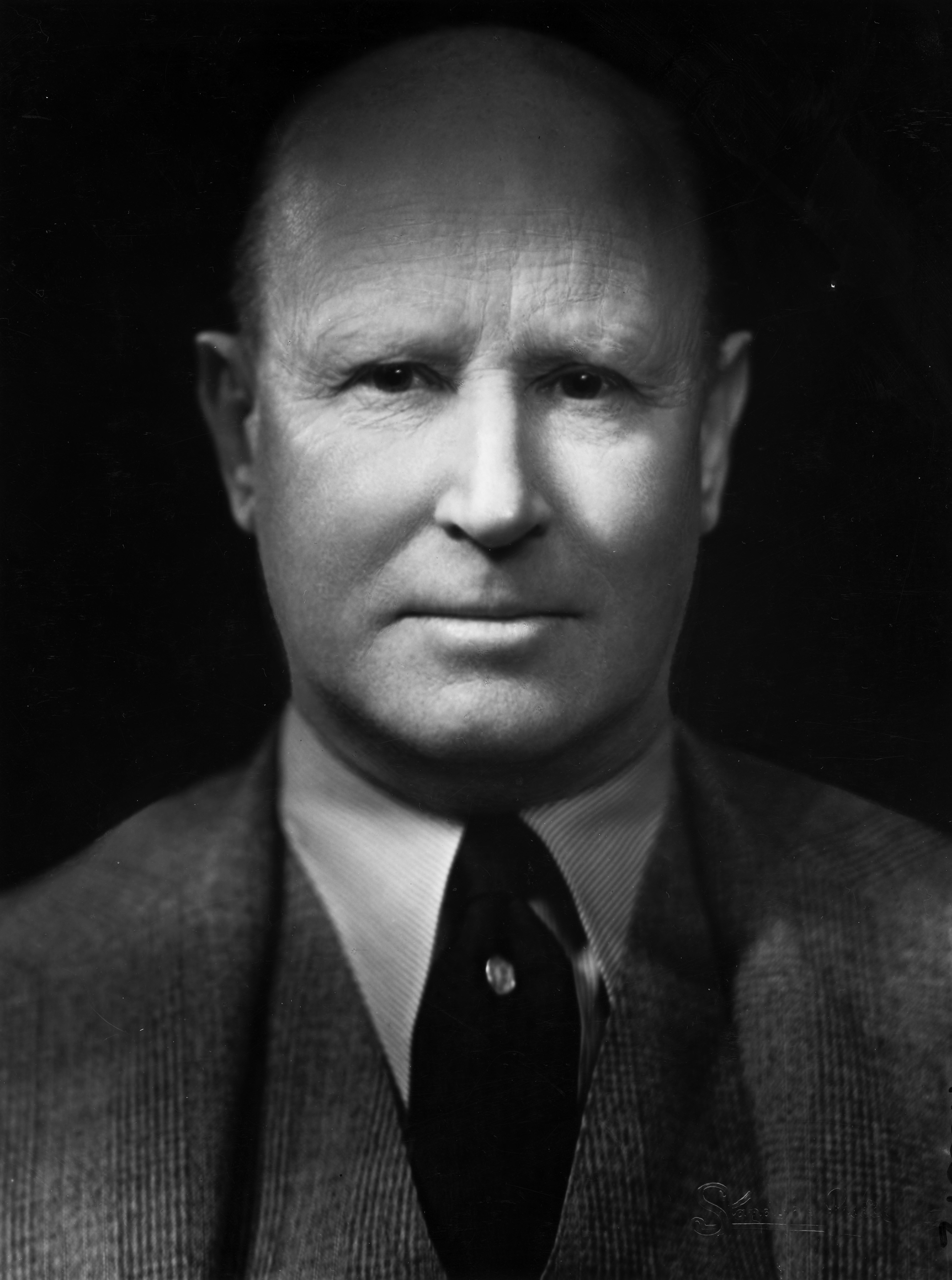
- Cecil Wood, ca 1933
- Born: 6 June 1878; Christchurch, New Zealand
- Died: 28 November 1947 (aged 69); Christchurch, New Zealand
- Occupation: Architect
- Buildings: Wellington Cathedral of St Paul and Christ's College Memorial Dining Hall

Cecil Walter Wood (6 June 1878 – 28 November 1947) was a New Zealand architect. He was the dominant architect in Canterbury during the interwar period.

== Early life ==
Wood was born in Christchurch, New Zealand, in 1878. At his birth, the family lived in Cashel Street West near Antigua Street. (Note: Cashel Street had been divided into east and west by the Avon River until 1873, when a bridge was provided, but the two halves of the street kept their cardinal descriptors for many years. Antigua Street extended as far north as Armagh Street until 1903, when the northern part was renamed Rolleston Avenue after William Rolleston.) His father, Robert Wood, was a timber merchant and later a Christchurch City councillor (1889–1895). His mother was Margaret Amelia (Amy) née Tribe. His parents had married in 1865 and Cecil was their sixth child. Shortly after childbirth, his mother died on 27 September 1885 (the infant daughter had died two days prior); Cecil was seven at that time and affected by his mother's death. His eldest sister Amy was subsequently in charge of the younger siblings until his father remarried—to Elizabeth Anne née Freeman—when Cecil was 13. The Wood children did not welcome their new mother and Cecil felt loneliness and resentment, to both his father and his stepmother, which lasted into adulthood.

Wood started his education at Miss Leete's School, a small private school for 20 primary pupils, in Gloucester Street. From age 10, he attended Christchurch West School. When he was 12, he received a scholarship that allowed him to attend courses at the School of Art at Canterbury College in the evenings and on Saturdays. Wood finished at Christchurch West aged 15. At Canterbury College, he gained "excellent passes" for his freehand drawings in his first year. As an architect, Wood is remembered for his artistic plans, where perspectives were drawn freehand and many regard his plans as art in itself. It is unclear why Wood chose architecture but it is assumed that the career of his uncle, the noted British architect Norman Shaw, was a consideration. His father's sister Agnes had married Shaw in Hampstead in 1867.

== Training ==
=== Articles with Strouts ===
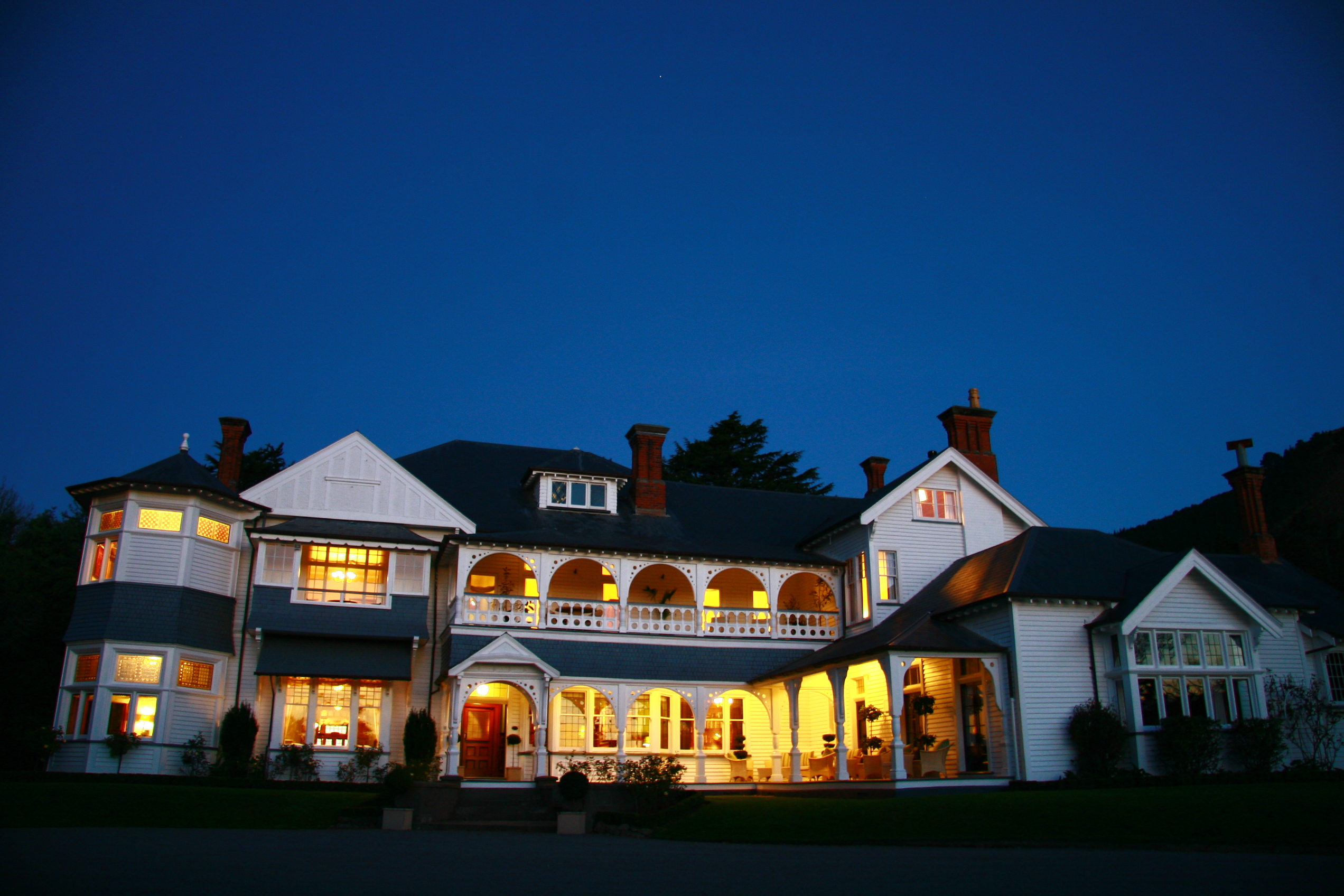
Otahuna, the homestead of Sir Heaton Rhodes

In June 1893, Wood's father paid NZ£100 to the architect Frederick Strouts for Cecil Wood to be articled to him. Strouts had qualified as an architect in England in 1869 after having emigrated to Christchurch in 1859. Strouts was one of the founders of the Canterbury Association of Architects in 1871. When Wood joined the firm, Strouts had just made Robert Ballantyne (1866–1936) a junior partner. Two major commissions that the office worked on during Wood's time were the Hyman Marks block of Christchurch Hospital and the homestead for Sir Heaton Rhodes, Otahuna. Strouts had a longstanding association with the Rhodes family and after Strouts retired, Wood received many of that family's commissions. At Otahuna, Wood designed a cottage in 1914 and a woolshed in 1927. After Rhodes' wife had died, Wood designed St Paul's Church—a small stone church in Tai Tapu—as a memorial to Lady Rhodes in 1929 (registered as Category I). In 1931, Wood designed the Tai Tapu library for Rhodes (registered as Category I). Strouts does not appear to have shaped Wood's architectural approach but Wood showed the same professionalism and integrity that he had observed in his teacher.

As was usual at the time, tertiary education was undertaken in the evenings and on Saturdays. Wood took a four-year diploma course at Canterbury College from 1894, where Samuel Hurst Seager was his teacher. Seager introduced Wood to Arts and Crafts architecture. In his first year at the college, Seager encouraged Wood to enter one of his designs to a competition run by the magazine The Australasian Builder and Contractors' News. Wood won third prize.

Wood finished his apprenticeship with Strouts and once Strouts retired in 1899, meaning that he only worked for existing clients or on follow-up projects, he finished his employment there.

=== Draftsman for Ballantyne and Clarkson ===
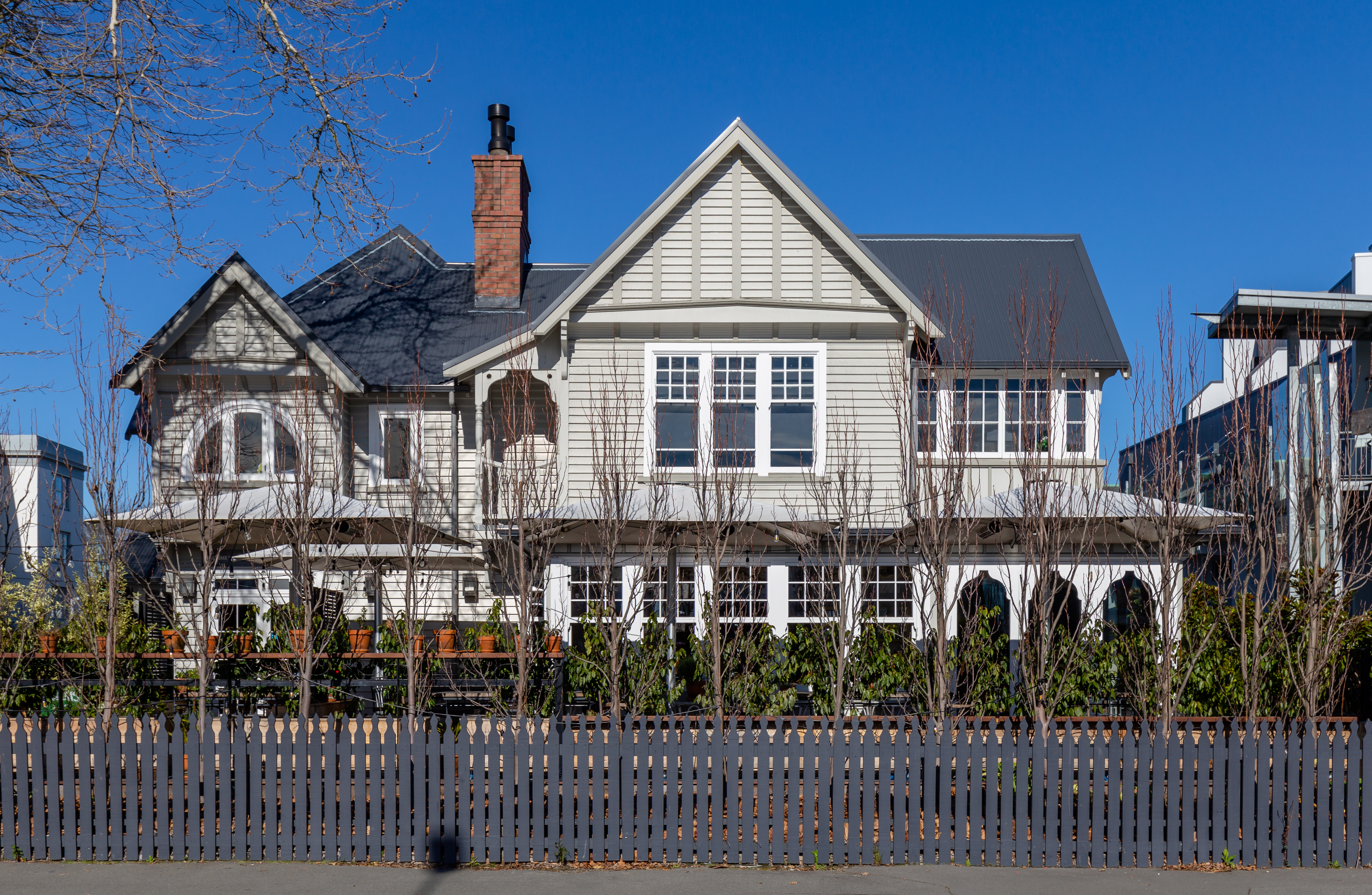
Ironside House

Ballantyne also left Strouts and set up a partnership with William Clarkson (1863–1917). Wood joined them in 1899 as their draughtsman. The office had a wide range of building types to design. Their commercial designs did not shape Wood's architectural practice but their domestic work was later reflected in Wood's own designs. It is not known for certain what designs Wood worked on but it is assumed that he had input to the Canterbury Hall (1899–1900), which created much publicity for Ballantyne and Clarkson. Another project where Wood was likely involved was a large domestic house on the corner of Salisbury Street, then known as Scott House but today mostly referred to as Ironside House. By 1901, Ballantyne and Clarkson had little work and that may have contributed to Wood's decision to go to England to further his career.

=== London County Council ===
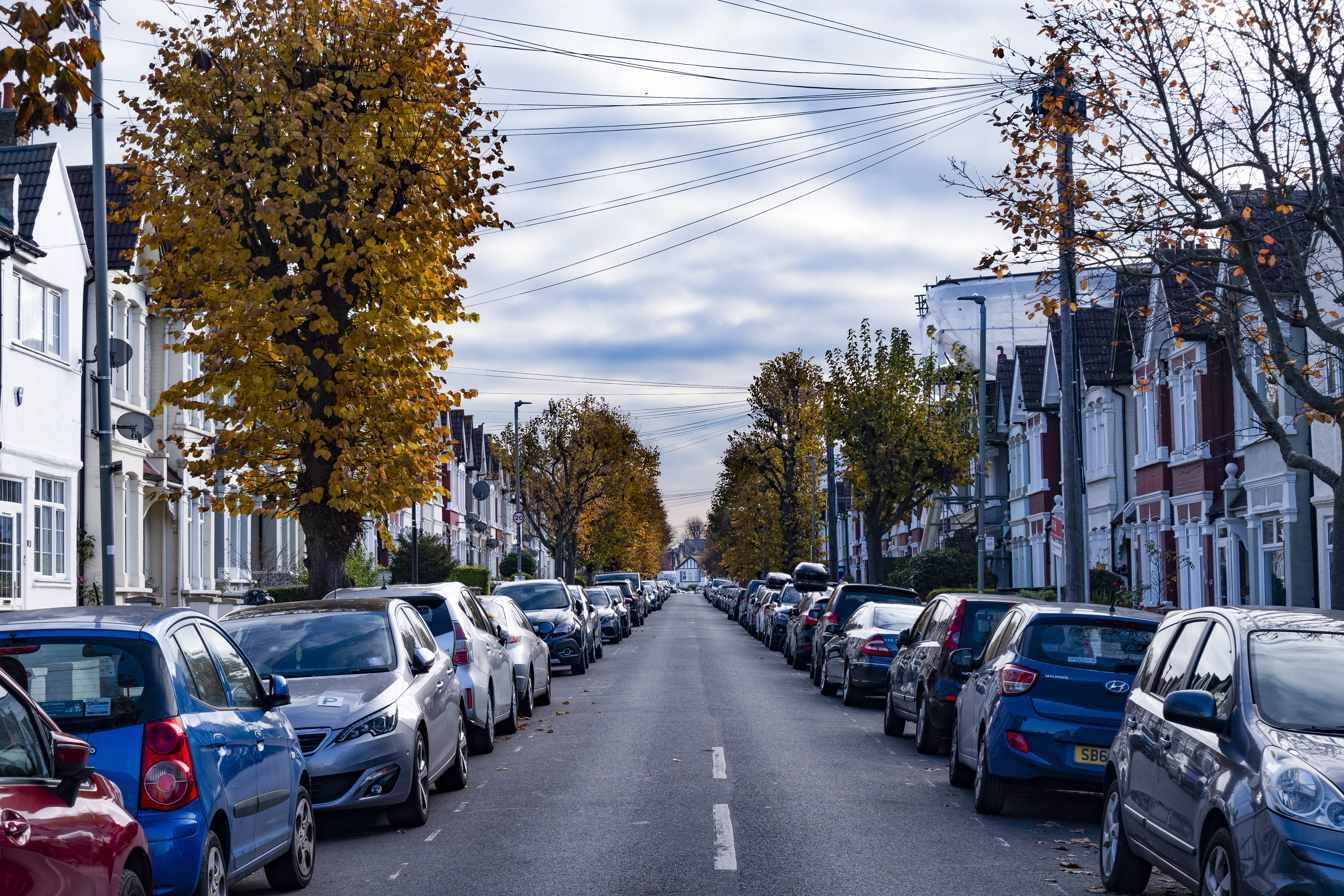
Totterdown Fields (Gassiot Road shown) contained 1,229 individual houses

Wood had received architectural training from both Strouts and Seager under the English tradition and it was thus a logical step for him to at some stage go to England himself to become more familiar with this genre. Once again, he received financial assistance from his father for this next stage of education. He left from the Port of Lyttelton on board SS Rotomahana for Wellington on 21 February 1901. From Wellington, he left for Sydney on 2 March on the SS Monowai. In Sydney, he took the SS Runic on its maiden-return journey to England, leaving on 8 March. Wood produced a pencil sketch of the Runic in Port Melbourne on 13 March.

Wood's uncle, Norman Shaw, had closed his office in 1896 but was still working and highly regarded. It would have been easy for Wood to get his uncle to give recommendations to other architects but Wood was too proud to ask for help. During his time in London, he visited his aunt and uncle just once and it was a social call. Wood found employment with the Housing Branch of the Architects' Department of London County Council. The branch was headed by the architect William Riley and their task was to create social housing so that the slums could be removed from central London. When he arrived, the group had just delivered the design for the Millbank Estate and this project was under construction. When he joined, the group started designing cottage estates. It is likely that Wood would have worked on Totterdown Fields, the first of the London County Council cottage estates. It was the Housing of the Working Classes Act 1900 that allowed local councils to create cottage estates. It was not just a stimulating working environment where Wood was surrounded by young and progressive architects, but also a highly political field where many of the underlying ideas of how to deal with the underclasses of society were based in socialism. From 1902 to 1904, a fellow New Zealand architect in the office was Basil Hooper from Dunedin.

=== Assistant to Robert Weir Schultz ===
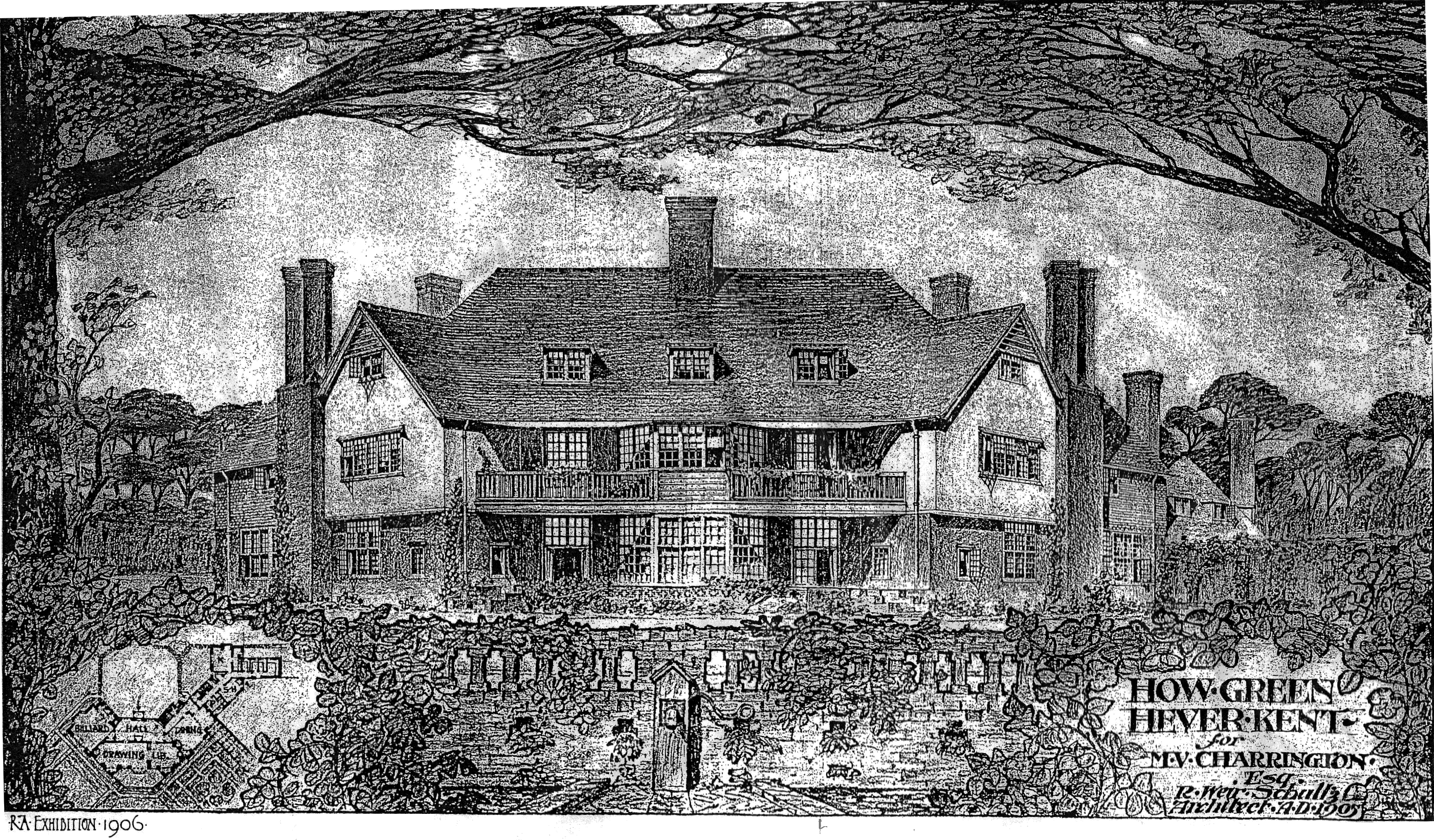
Schultz's design for How Green House, drawn by Wood, was exhibited at the Royal Academy

In 1903, Wood joined the practice of Robert Weir Schultz, with the office located at Gray's Inn Square. Schultz, who had worked for Shaw from 1884 to 1886 and was heavily influenced by Shaw's chief clerk William Lethaby, was a leading proponent of the Arts and Craft movement and a member of the Art Workers' Guild. Schultz believed in sound craftsmanship and wanted every architect to start their apprenticeship with a builder. He rejected academicism and for that reason, he never joined the Royal Institute of British Architects (RIBA). Wood passed the RIBA Intermediate Examination in November 1904 while employed with Schultz and that would have allowed him to become an Associate, but he did not apply until 1919. It might have been Schultz's influence that Wood did not apply at the time he became eligible.

In his designs, Schultz paid close attention to the relationship between houses and their gardens. While Wood worked for him, Schultz had five or six assistants, but he never delegated any design work to them. One of the tasks that Wood performed for Schultz was to draw perspectives. Two designs that show Wood's initials are for Beaumonts in Four Elms, Kent, and for How Green House near Hever, Kent. Beaumonts was exhibited at the Royal Academy and then loaned to be displayed at the 1906–1907 International Exhibition in Christchurch, New Zealand. Wood's perspective of the How Green House was featured in the magazine British Architect in May 1906 and received a favourable review.

The view of the garden front, cleverly drawn in coloured chalk, shows how a house may be broadly treated and well bound together in line and mass, whilst being very picturesque. There is a good balance of features, gables and chimneys...

Wood spent two years with Schultz and learned the importance of good planning, the choice of materials appropriate for the location and task, and how to work in with craftsmen so that a high quality of construction can be achieved.

=== Assistant to Leonard Stokes ===
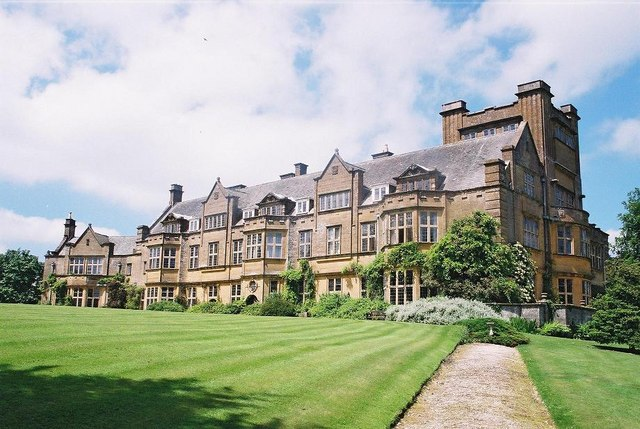
Minterne House in Dorset, which Leonard Stokes worked on while Wood was in his office

In 1905, Wood moved to the office of Leonard Stokes. Like Schultz, he was a leading architect in the Arts and Craft movement and he also had a large office. Stokes designed churches, convents, education buildings, houses, and telephone exchanges. A devout Roman Catholic, the church was a major client for him. While Wood was in the office, Minterne House in Minterne Magna, Dorset, for Edward Digby, 10th Baron Digby was being worked on. Another project was the Gerrard Street Telephone Exchange in Gerrard Street, London. Stokes was difficult to work for as he was quick-tempered, and both his staff and clients "often felt the whip of his tongue". He was acknowledged and admired for his rational design approach and for his original designs. His work showed a good sense of scale and he paid attention to detail. Wood spent some months only at Stokes' office but was much influenced by him, and later designs for education buildings and houses drew inspiration from Stokes' designs.

== Independent practice ==
=== Hurst Seager, Wood and Munnings ===
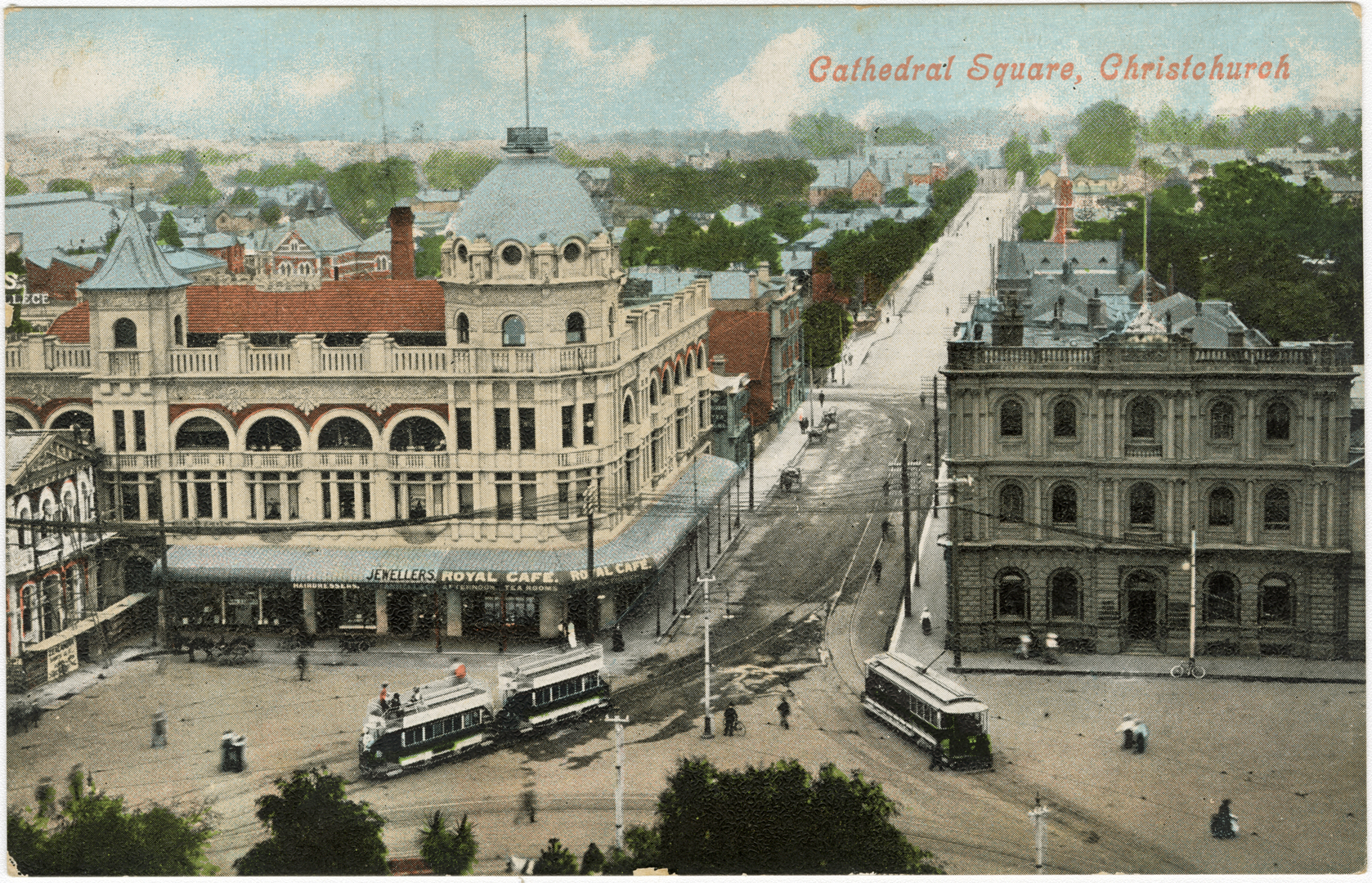
Seager and Wood had their office in Cathedral Square in the AMP Building (right)

On his return to New Zealand, Wood stopped over in Wellington in February 1906 to visit two of his brothers. Effective 12 February 1906, he became partner to Seager in his office in Cathedral Square, with their firm known as "Hurst Seager and Wood". Wood and Seager turned their attention to the upcoming International Exhibition, which was to be held in North Hagley Park from November 1906. The Liberal Government had passed the Workers' Dwelling Act 1905, with the same philosophy as the projects that Wood had worked on in London. They won the South Island section of the competition for a model workers' house and their design was built on the exhibition grounds. After the International Exhibition closed in April 1907, their building was moved to 52 Longfellow Street in Sydenham where it still stands today. The house is registered with Heritage New Zealand as a Category II item. They also entered the North Island competition for model workers' houses and their design was one of the chosen ones; 5 houses were built in Petone where an initial 25 houses were built by the Liberal Government. Compared to the other social houses, they were simpler and more intimate in scale. The local media reacted badly to the designs, which lacked typical elements that were common at the time and present in the other 20 houses. The New Zealand Mail labelled their design "The Blot" and described it as "unsatisfactory throughout" and "a grave mistake": erecting "one of them would have been too many." Seager would have had a greater involvement in the design than Wood as he had designed timber cottages since 1900 when one was designed for John Macmillan Brown in Cashmere. The Petone houses are nearly identical to cottage No. 2 at The Spur in Clifton, Christchurch. Two of the houses in Petone are registered by Heritage New Zealand: 16 Patrick Street is a Category II entry and 19 Patrick Street a Category I entry. In addition, there is a Historic Area registration covering much of the social housing project.

In February 1907, Joseph Munnings (1879–1937) became a further partner, with the name of the firm changing to Hurst Seager, Wood and Munnings. Munnings was just a few months younger than Wood and they knew each other from Canterbury College where Seager had been their teacher, and Munnings then did his articles with his teacher. Afterwards, Munnings went to England and he worked for Leonard Stokes with Wood later also joined that firm. Munnings did some work on his own account in 1906 upon his return from England before joining Seager and Wood. The partnership between the three architects was dissolved in January 1909, with Munnings returning to England and Wood starting his own practice in the same building – the AMP Building in Cathedral Square.

It is uncertain whether Seager gave his junior partners much of an opportunity to develop their own architectural concepts. Two of the designs produced between 1907 and 1909 are credited to Munnings without doubt: the Convent Chapel in Barbadoes Street and a church in Merivale. Work was plentiful and Seager asked in April 1907 that the commission for the church be revoked. The vestry asked him to reconsider and Seager instead suggested that Munnings carry out the design. The church project was later abandoned. The chapel, however, was built and was considered the only Byzantine Revival architecture in the Southern Hemisphere. In 1906, Wood had produced an early perspective for the project but this is considered a reflection of his skill in preparing drawings, with Munnings credited as being the architect in contemporary reporting by The Press. Other projects where Wood had at least some input are the building for James Hay on the southwest corner of Bealey Avenue and Durham Street (Note: This building became known as Turret House. Damaged in the earthquakes, it was demolished in 2011.) and the building for Norman Lindsay Macbeth in Wairarapa Terrace in Merivale; (Note: Macbeth was Wood's brother-in-law; he had married his elder sister Lily in 1897.) for both the buildings, the drawings are in Wood's style and/or have his handwriting.

Opportunities for Wood and Munnings to gain experience arose when Seager travelled to Europe in March 1907, putting the partners in charge of the firm's projects. For Wood, this was likely what encouraged him to become independent. The Press reported in November 1908 that Seager and his wife expected to be back in Christchurch on 22 January 1909. And on 30 January 1909, the three architects announced that they dissolved their partnership effective that day, with existing commissions remaining with Wood and Munnings at office No. 13 in the building, with Seager retaining his office No. 14. Leopold Atkinson, who had been with the firm for eight years, left at the same time and became an independent architect in Wanganui.

=== Later career ===
Despite the newspaper advertisement that existing work would remain with Munnings and Wood, Munnings soon returned to England, leaving New Zealand at the end of April. Wood initially worked by himself but had employed Andrew Reese (1887–1917) as a draughtsman by February 1910. Reese worked for Wood until 1914 and on 1 March 1915, he entered into a partnership with George Hart. (Note: Andrew Reese was the youngest son of builder and politician Daniel Reese. Reese Jr. was killed in action in 1917 in the Battle of Messines.) Wood took on trainee architects and the three early ones that are known of are Heathcote Helmore (who started after he finished his education at Christ's College in 1912), Guy Cotterill (started 1 February 1915), and Shirley Blackburne from 1915. (Note: In December 1916, Blackburne had completed the second year of his diploma course and passed the examinations with first class.)

Later trainee architects were Paul Pascoe and Miles Warren.

Wood never entered any architectural competitions once in private practice but was held in high regard by the profession as evidenced by the fact that he was appointed judge at the three largest competitions during his time: for the Auckland War Memorial Museum (1922), the Auckland Civic Centre (1924), and the National Art Gallery and Museum in Wellington. The two other competitions that he judged were for the Wellington Public Library (now used as the City Gallery Wellington) and the Ashburton War Memorial.

Wood received a commission from Harry Knight to design a homestead for his property at Racecourse Hill near Darfield. The English Domestic Revival house was finished in 1912. (Note: The homestead was close to the epicentre of the 2010 Canterbury earthquake and got badly damaged, but was rebuilt.)

In 1922, Wood was one of two architects nominated by the Institute of Architects for judging designs for the Auckland War Memorial Museum; the other architect was Reginald Ford of Wanganui. (Note: The other members appointed to the judging panel for the Auckland War Memorial Museum were the newspaper proprietor Thomson Leys, the botanist Thomas Cheeseman who had been curator of museum's predecessor since 1874, and barrister and former mayor of Mt Eden Oliver Nicholson.) In 1924, Wood was on the competition panel for the Auckland Civic Centre alongside Walter Bush (Auckland's city engineer), W. Gray Young (architect from Wellington), George Baildon and John Dempsey (the latter two both councillors for Auckland City Council). (Note: The Auckland Civic Centre project, strongly favoured by long-time mayor James Gunson, came to nothing as the loan for it was rejected in the 1925 local elections.)

He designed many heritage buildings in New Zealand including Wellington Cathedral of St Paul and the Memorial Dining Hall at Christ's College. He became an associate of the New Zealand Institute of Architects in 1914, a fellow in 1926 and was elected the President in 1937. He was one of three prominent New Zealand architects in the inter-war period; the others were W. Gray Young (Wellington) and William Gummer (Auckland).

== Family and death ==
From 1907 to 1909, Wood lived at The Spur in Sumner in one of the houses designed by Hurst Seager. On 22 December 1909 at St Luke's Church, Wood married Iris Bruce, the daughter of W. Bruce, with the ceremony performed by vicar William Sedgwick. The Woods had no children. In 1911, Wood designed a house for his wife and himself at 74 Richmond Hill Road in Sumner. This was one of the first houses in the 1910 Richmond Hill subdivision; it was located above the cliff behind Nayland Street. They lived there from 1911 until 1922, when they moved into the central city. The area, including this property, was red-zoned after the earthquakes.

In October 1944, Wood designed a retirement house for his wife and himself. The building, at 16 Helmore Road (since renamed to Helmores Lane), is located in Merivale and was finished in 1946. The façade facing Rhodes Street has a steep pitch and this design element was adopted by other local architects for domestic buildings. Wood died at his home on 28 November 1947. His wife died more than three decades later in 1979. Their ashes were interred in the ambulatory of St Paul's Cathedral.

Cecil Wood Way on Richmond Hill in Sumner, where he had designed many houses, was named after him in the early 1980s.

== Gallery of his work ==
Building	Image	Date	Location	Notes
How Green House		1905	Hever	Wood prepared the perspective drawings.
House (52 Longfellow Street)		1906	Sydenham	Built in Hagley Park for the International Exhibition and afterwards relocated to Sydenham; NZHPT Category II listing.
House at 6 Patrick Street, Petone		1906	Petone	Several houses of this design were built in this street. 16 Patrick Street is a Category II entry and 19 Patrick Street a Category I entry.
Glenroy House		1906	Glentunnel	Originally built in Merivale but relocated to Glentunnel in 1996.
Christ's College School House		1909	Christchurch Central City	Part of Christ's College; NZHPT Category II listing
St Michael and All Angels, Stone School Building		1912	Christchurch Central City	NZHPT Category II listing
Racecourse Hill Homestead		1912	Racecourse Hill	Badly damaged in the 2010 Canterbury earthquake, the house has been restored.
Former St Margaret's College building		1914	Christchurch Central City	St Margaret's College has since relocated to Merivale; this building is now part of Cathedral Grammar School. NZHPT Category II listing
Hare Memorial Library		1915	Christchurch Central City	NZHPT Category I listing
Holbury		1915	Cashmere	Demolished after the earthquakes; former NZHPT Category II listing
Rowandale		1922	Okains Bay	NZHPT Category II listing
Weston House		1924	Christchurch Central City	Damaged by earthquakes and demolished in July 2011; former NZHPT Category I listing
Public Trust Building, Christchurch		1925	Christchurch Central City	NZHPT Category II listing
Christ's College Memorial Dining Room		1925	Christchurch Central City	Part of Christ's College; NZHPT Category I listing
Memorial Hall		1925	Lincoln University	A war memorial built as an extension to Ivey Hall.
St Barnabas Church		1926	Fendalton	NZHPT Category I listing
Fleming House, Christchurch		1926	Christchurch Central City	NZHPT Category II listing
Bishopspark Main Building and Chapel		1926	Christchurch Central City	NZHPT Category I listing
Worcester Chambers		1927	Christchurch Central City	NZHPT Category II listing
Theosophical Society Building		1927	Christchurch Central City	Demolished in 2012 after sustaining earthquake damage; former NZHPT Category II listing
Ballantyne House		1927	Fendalton	NZHPT Category II listing
Public Trust Building, Dunedin		May 1928	Central Dunedin	Used by the Public Trust until 1996 and it has been an office building since.
St Peter's Church, Riccarton		1928	Upper Riccarton	Addition of stone tower and vestries designed by Wood in 1928. NZHPT Category II listing.
Cashmere Hills Presbyterian Church		1929	Cashmere	NZHPT Category II listing
Gambrill House		1930	Gisborne	NZHPT Category II listing
Christ's College Jacobs House		1930	Christchurch Central City	Part of Christ's College; NZHPT Category II listing
St Paul's Church		1931	Tai Tapu	NZHPT Category I listing
Hutchinson Motors Building		1931	Christchurch Central City	NZHPT Category II listing
Christ's College open air classrooms		1932	Christchurch Central City	Part of Christ's College; NZHPT Category II listing
Tai Tapu Public Library		1932	Tai Tapu	NZHPT Category I listing
St Barnabas Church		1933	Woodend	NZHPT Category II listing
State Insurance Building		1935	Christchurch Central City	NZHPT Category II listing
Hereford Street Post Office		1937	Christchurch Central City	Post office, telephone exchange and savings bank building.
Arthur Dudley Dobson Memorial		1937-04-18	Arthur's Pass	Memorial obelisk commemorating Sir Arthur Dudley Dobson.
Ashburton Art Gallery		1938	Ashburton Central	Offices for the Ashburton County Council; now the town's public art gallery.
St Andrew's Church		1939	Maheno	The concept design was prepared by Wood and the architectural plans developed by Richard Strachan De Renzy Harman.
Invercargill Public Art Gallery		1951	Invercargill	NZHPT Category I listing
Wellington Cathedral of St Paul		1964	Thorndon	The design for which Wood is best known; it was completed long after his death by Bob and Margaret Munro.
