= Otahuna =

Coordinates: 43°39′35.31″S 172°35′1.9″E

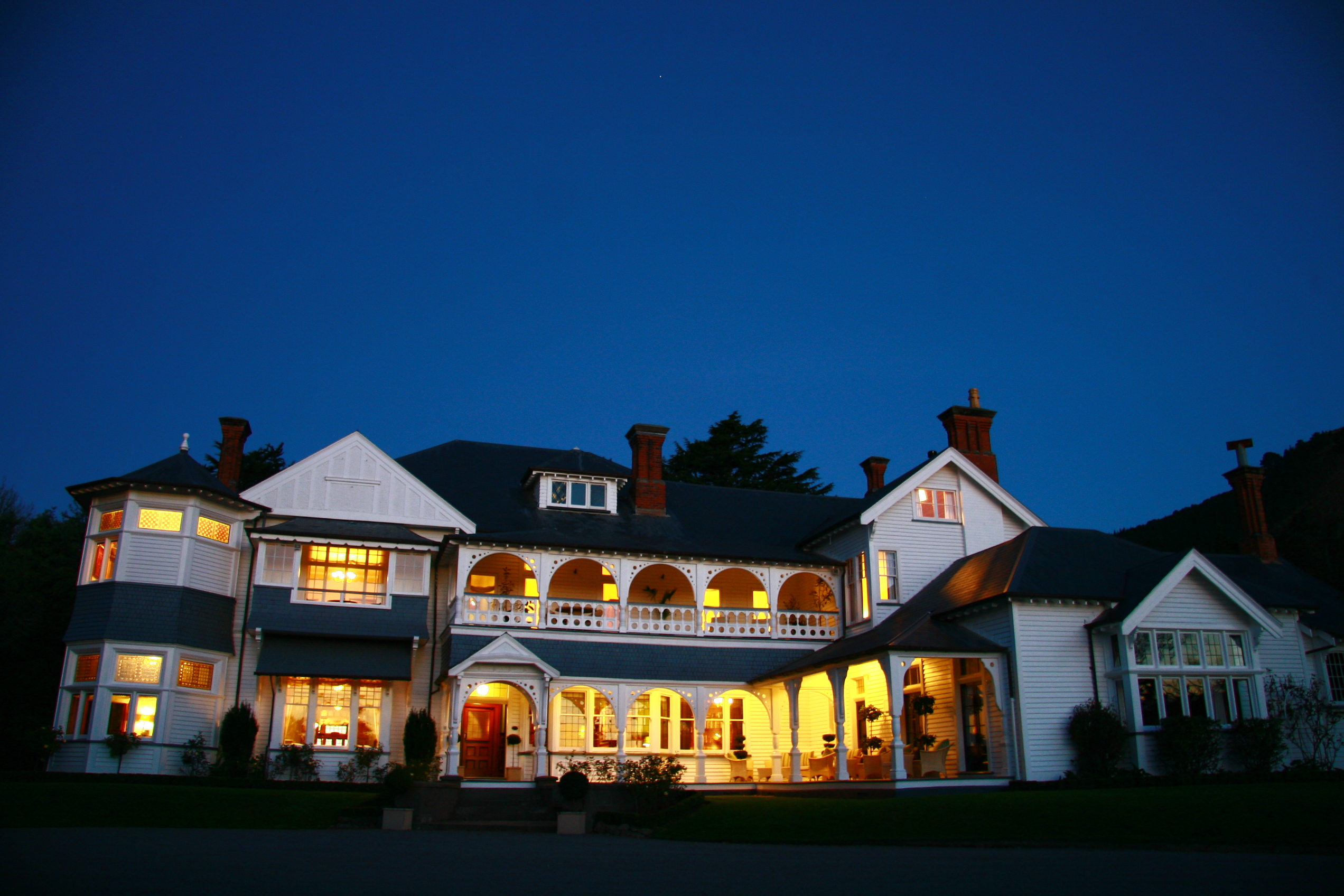
Night shot of Otahuna in 2007

Otahuna Lodge is the former homestead of the lawyer, runholder, stock breeder, politician, horticulturist, philatelist and philanthropist Sir Heaton Rhodes (1861–1956). The grand country house is located near Tai Tapu on Banks Peninsula, New Zealand.

The building, designed by Christchurch architect Frederick Strouts, was finished in 1895 and is registered with Heritage New Zealand (formerly the New Zealand Historic Places Trust) as a Category I heritage structure. When Strouts received the commission, he had just made Robert Ballantyne his junior partner and Cecil Wood had joined him for his articles. Strouts had previously received a number of commissions from the Rhodes family. Strouts and Ballantyne designed the entrance lodge for Otahuna in 1897. Strouts, born in 1834, had fully retired by 1905 and subsequent commissions by the Rhodes family went to Wood. At Otahuna, Wood designed a cottage in 1914 and a woolshed in 1927. After Rhodes' wife had died, Wood designed St Paul's Church—a small stone church in Tai Tapu—as a memorial to Lady Rhodes in 1929 (registered as Category I). In 1931, Wood designed the Tai Tapu library for Rhodes (registered as Category I).

Beginning in 2007, the house was converted into luxury accommodation. Tatler has included it on its list of the 101 best hotels worldwide. After receiving damage in the February 2011 Christchurch earthquake, the newly restored building opened again in August 2011.
