= Halswell River =

Coordinates: 43°44′59″S 172°36′21″E

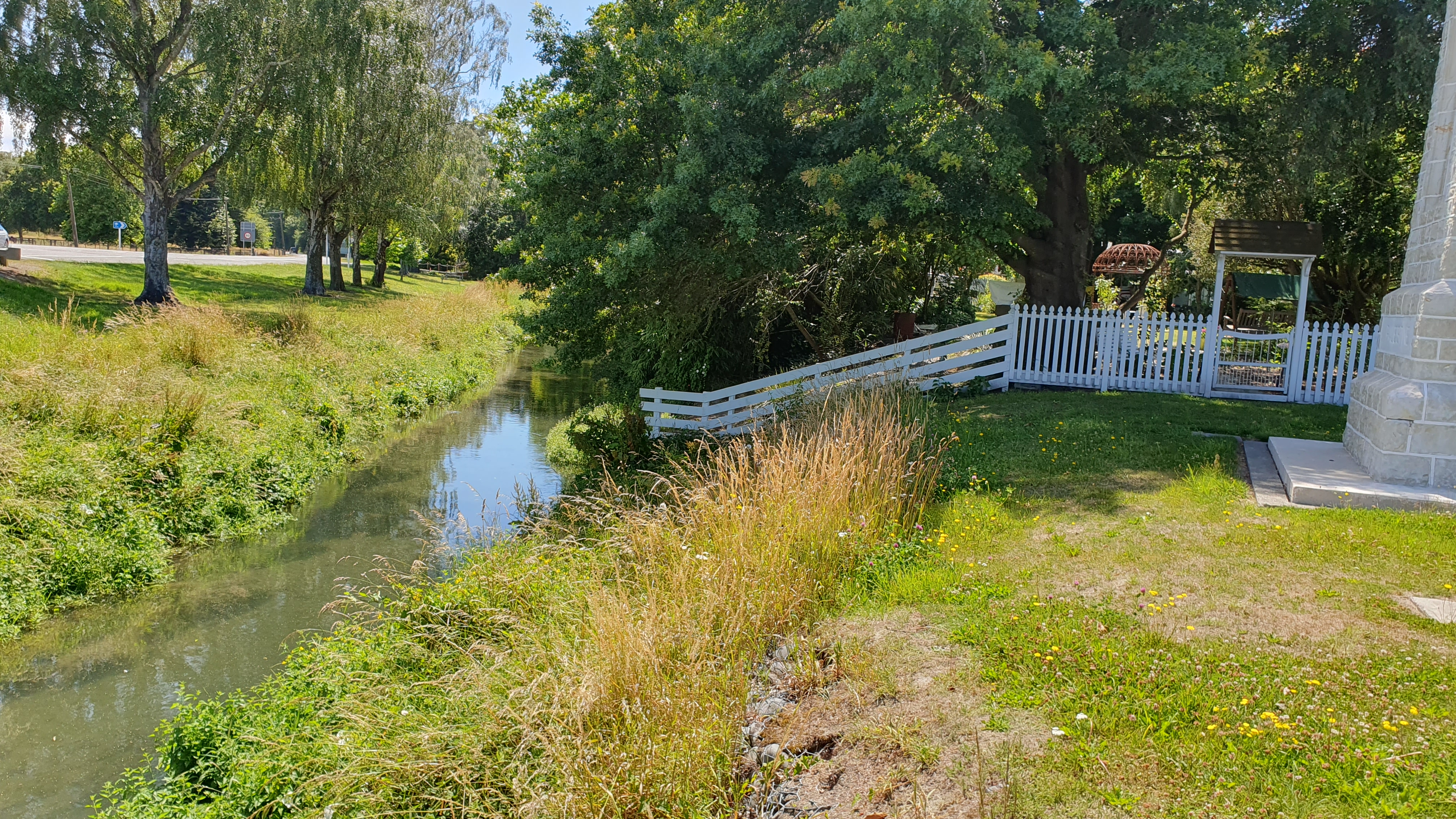
- Halswell River flowing through Tai Tapu

- Location of the mouth within New Zealand
- Native name: Huritini (Māori)

Location
- Country: New Zealand

Physical characteristics
- Source
  - location: Port Hills
- Mouth
  - location: Lake Ellesmere / Te Waihora

The Halswell River (Māori: Huritini) is a river in the Canterbury region of New Zealand.

The Halswell River has a catchment area of 190 square kilometres (73 sq mi), 85% of which fall into Selwyn District with the balance in Christchurch City. The catchment within Christchurch City, mostly covered by the suburb of Halswell, is urban, and most of the Selwyn District catchment is rural. The two main tributaries are Knights Stream (which originates between Prebbleton and the suburb of Oaklands) and Te Tauawa a Maka / Nottingham Stream (which originates in Oaklands).

The Halswell River rises north-west of the Port Hills on the periphery of Christchurch and flows south into Lake Ellesmere / Te Waihora. Parts of the river originally had the Māori names of Huritini (meaning "many turns"), Te Tau Awa a Maka and Te Heru o Kahukura. The river was renamed for Edmund Halswell, who was a member of the management committee of the Canterbury Association and arrived in New Zealand in 1841.

== See also ==
- List of rivers of New Zealand
