= Halswell =

Suburb of Christchurch, New Zealand

- Suburb
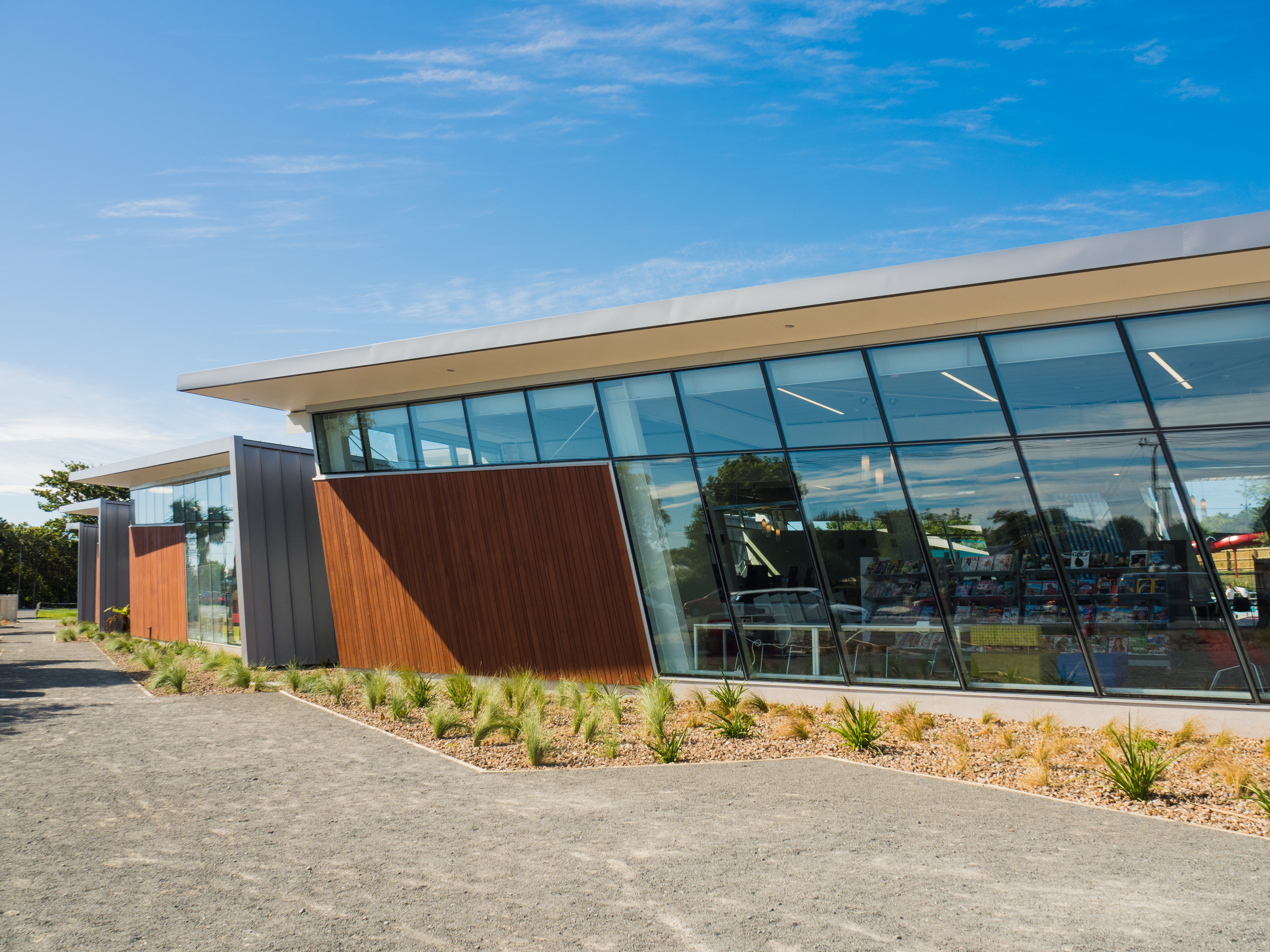
- Te Hāpua, a city library and community centre in Halswell
- Interactive map of Halswell
- Coordinates: 43°35′S 172°34′E
- Country: New Zealand
- City: Christchurch
- Local authority: Christchurch City Council
- Electoral ward: Halswell
- Community board: Waipuna Halswell-Hornby-Riccarton

Area
  - Land: 1,254 ha (3,100 acres)

Population (June 2025)
  - Total: 13,620
  - Density: 1,086/km^{2} (2,813/sq mi)

	Oaklands	Hoon Hay
Prebbleton	Halswell	Westmorland
	Ladbrooks	Kennedys Bush

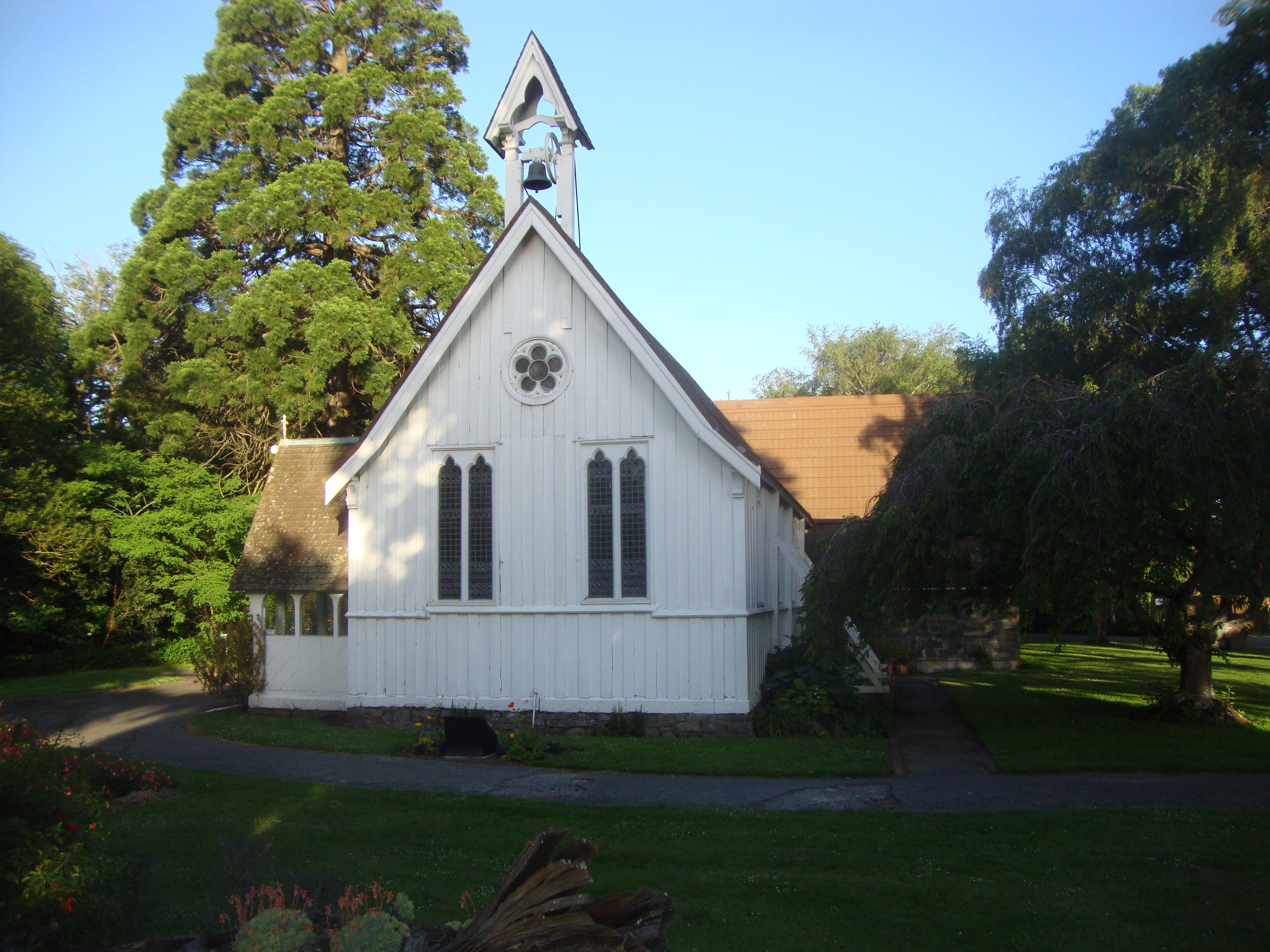
St Mary's Anglican Church

Originally a separate village, Halswell is now a residential suburb of Christchurch, New Zealand, located 9 kilometres (5.6 mi) southwest of Cathedral Square on State Highway 75.

== History ==
Halswell is named after Edmund Halswell QC (1790–1874), a government officer and member of the management commission of the Canterbury Association. He arrived in New Zealand in 1841 and was appointed Commissioner of Native Reserves. The Māori name of Tai Tapu for the area is preserved in the name of a village located some 9 kilometres (5.6 mi) south of the centre of Halswell.

== Overview ==
Until fairly recently, Halswell was completely separated from the city geographically. In the 1960s the suburb of Oaklands was established to the north of the original Halswell village, and this expanded further when Westlake was developed in the late 1980s. The subdivision of Aidanfield in the 1990s effectively joined Halswell to the Christchurch urban area.

The Rocks subdivision was established at the top of Kennedy's Bush Road, which is situated on the Port Hills, while the rest of Halswell sits on the flat ground of the Canterbury Plains.

Since the Christchurch earthquakes of 2011, the Halswell area has been growing rapidly, with subdivisions now extending in all directions. Longhurst and Knights Stream have been developed to the west, with amenities such as a medical centre, kindergarten and shopping hub.

Halswell has a public swimming pool, library, community hub, Catholic, Anglican, and United churches, and a post office with Kiwibank. The Halswell Quarry Park is a 60.4 hectares (0.604 km^{2}) family orientated park maintained by the Christchurch City Council. The park features all weather walking tracks, a network of mountain bike tracks, dog and horse exercise areas as well as native and exotic planted areas. Although named for this suburb, the quarry is located in the adjacent suburb Kennedys Bush.

Halswell Domain is a park in the centre of Halswell. It includes a playground and skate park, a boating pond and a miniature railway, which runs on Sunday afternoons. On the edge of Halswell Domain is the Halswell War Memorial, unveiled in 1924 by Sir Heaton Rhodes MP.

The Nottingham Stream flows through the suburb and joins the Halswell River.

== Demographics ==
Halswell covers 12.54 km^{2} (4.84 sq mi). It had an estimated population of 13,620 as of June 2025, with a population density of 1,086 people per km^{2}.

Historical population
Year	Pop.	±% p.a.
2006	4,149	—
2013	4,482	+1.11%
2018	8,202	+12.85%
2023	11,085	+6.21%
The 2006 population is for a smaller area of 10.76 km^{2}. Source:

Halswell had a population of 11,085 in the 2023 New Zealand census, an increase of 2,883 people (35.1%) since the 2018 census, and an increase of 6,603 people (147.3%) since the 2013 census. There were 5,373 males, 5,685 females, and 27 people of other genders in 3,993 dwellings. 2.9% of people identified as LGBTIQ+. There were 2,295 people (20.7%) aged under 15 years, 1,866 (16.8%) aged 15 to 29, 5,499 (49.6%) aged 30 to 64, and 1,419 (12.8%) aged 65 or older.

People could identify as more than one ethnicity. The results were 72.3% European (Pākehā); 6.2% Māori; 2.0% Pasifika; 24.4% Asian; 2.1% Middle Eastern, Latin American and African New Zealanders (MELAA); and 2.1% other, which includes people giving their ethnicity as "New Zealander". English was spoken by 94.6%, Māori by 1.4%, Samoan by 0.5%, and other languages by 22.3%. No language could be spoken by 2.9% (e.g. too young to talk). New Zealand Sign Language was known by 0.6%. The percentage of people born overseas was 32.0, compared with 28.8% nationally.

Religious affiliations were 30.6% Christian, 3.2% Hindu, 1.8% Islam, 0.1% Māori religious beliefs, 0.8% Buddhist, 0.2% New Age, 0.1% Jewish, and 2.0% other religions. People who answered that they had no religion were 55.6%, and 5.6% of people did not answer the census question.

Of those at least 15 years old, 3,231 (36.8%) people had a bachelor's or higher degree, 4,077 (46.4%) had a post-high school certificate or diploma, and 1,479 (16.8%) people exclusively held high school qualifications. 1,500 people (17.1%) earned over $100,000 compared to 12.1% nationally. The employment status of those at least 15 was 5,235 (59.6%) full-time, 1,251 (14.2%) part-time, and 141 (1.6%) unemployed.

Individual statistical areas
Name	Area (km^{2})	Population	Density (per km^{2})	Dwellings	Median age	Median income
Halswell West	3.82	3,753	982	1,338	34.7 years	$56,000
Halswell South West	2.77	1,005	363	345	32.9 years	$60,900
Halswell North	2.05	2,454	1,197	882	39.2 years	$54,300
Halswell South	1.48	2,553	1,725	957	39.1 years	$48,000
Halswell South East	2.42	1,320	545	471	35.3 years	$62,900
New Zealand					38.1 years	$41,500

== Education ==
Halswell School and Knights Stream School are co-educational full primary schools for years 1 to 8, with rolls of 733 and 647 students, respectively. Halswell School was established in 1864, and was rebuilt after the 2010 Christchurch earthquake. Knights Stream opened in 2019. Rolls are as of July 2026.

Seven Oaks School and Seven Oaks Secondary School were private schools sharing a campus and together providing education for years 1 to 13. They started in 2009 and moved to a new site in 2017. The schools closed in December 2024.

== Notable residents ==
- Harry Ell (1862–1934), Member of Parliament and promoter of the Summit Road
