= Cashmere Hills Presbyterian Church =

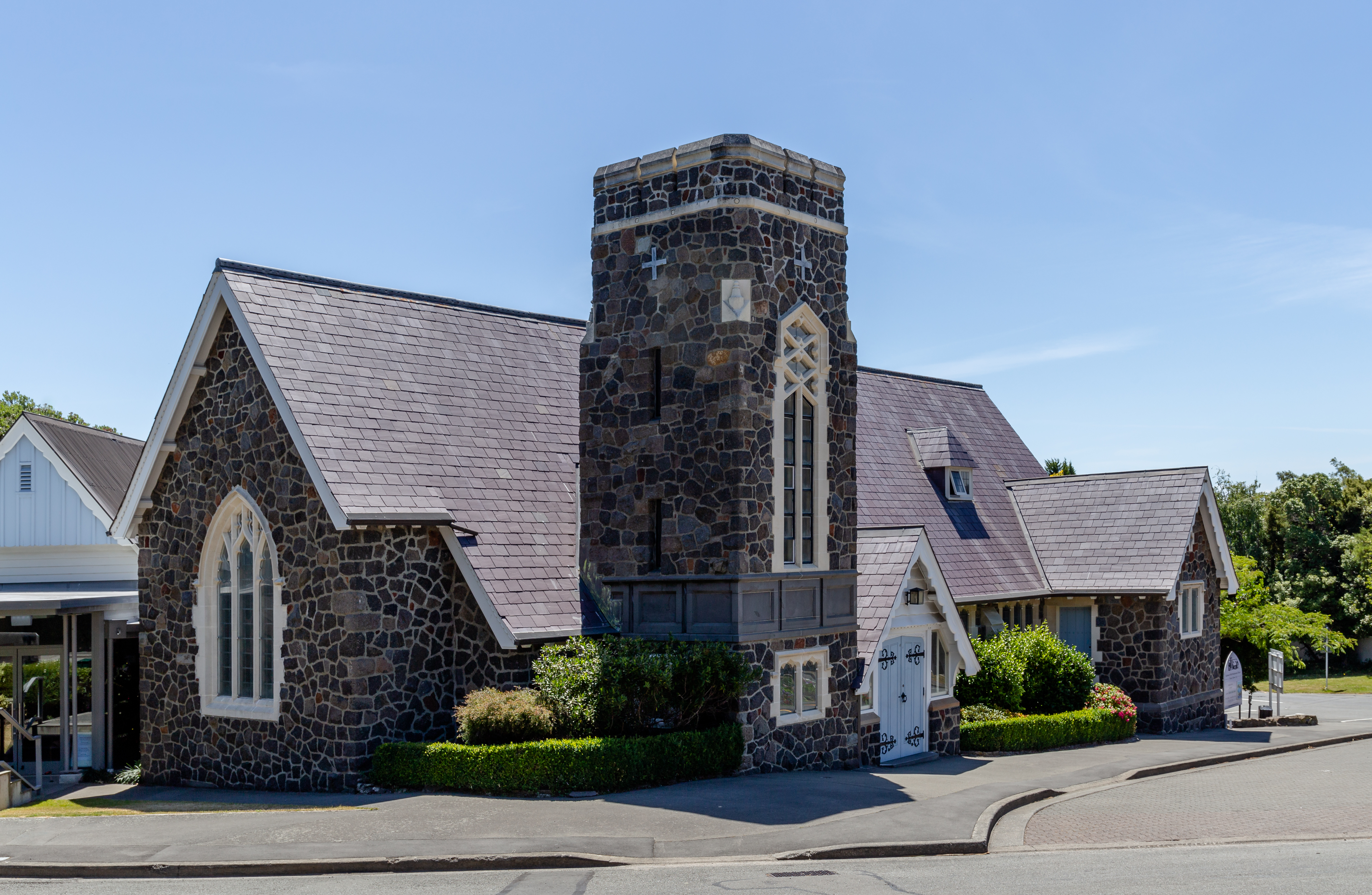
- Cashmere Hills Presbyterian Church in 2019
- Cashmere Hills Presbyterian Church
- 43.572719°S 172.630866°E
- Location: 2 MacMillan Avenue, Christchurch
- Country: New Zealand
- Denomination: Presbyterian

Architecture
- Architect(s): Richard Harman and Cecil Wood
- Style: Arts and Crafts
- Years built: 1929

Heritage New Zealand – Category 2
- Designated: 26 November 1981
- Reference no.: 1842

Cashmere Hills Presbyterian Church is a Presbyterian church in Christchurch, New Zealand. It is registered as Category II by Heritage New Zealand.

== History ==
In 1924 land was purchased for a Presbyterian church in the hills. Cecil Wood was commissioned to design the church, however his business partner Richard Harman oversaw the construction of the church. The foundation stone was laid in September 1928 and the church was opened and dedicated on 24 August 1929.

== Canterbury earthquakes and restoration ==
The church sustained damage during the September 2010 Christchurch earthquake and also in the February 2011 Christchurch earthquake but it has since been repaired. The Canterbury Earthquake Recovery Authority (CERA) had assessed the structure as 3% of the earthquake code and wanted to demolish it. Michael King, a director of the structural engineering joint venture Miyamoto and Cardno, successfully challenged this assessment through submitting five reports.
