= How Green House =

Coordinates: 51°11′48″N 0°6′28″E

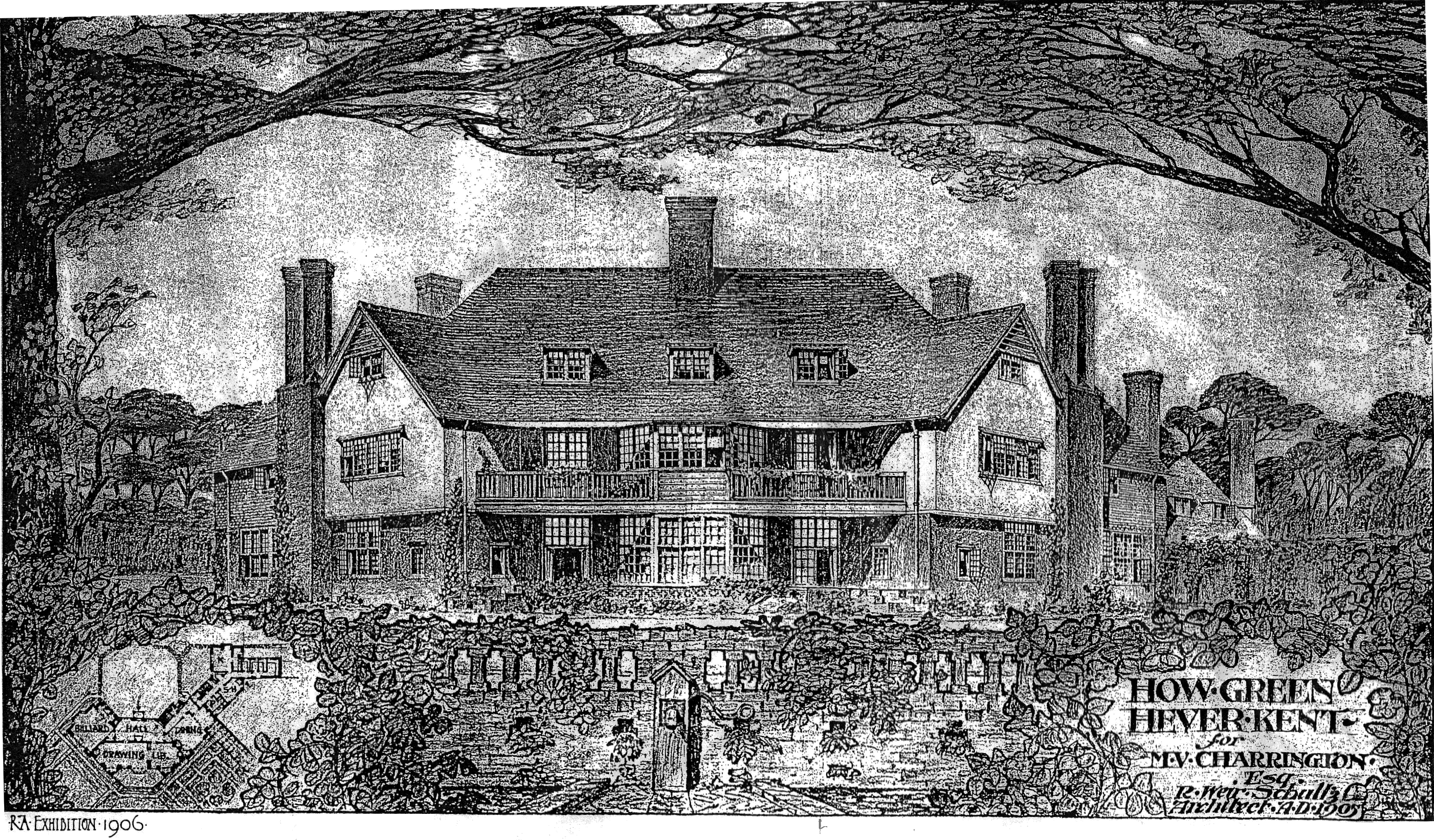
Schultz's design, drawn by Cecil Wood, was exhibited at the Royal Academy in 1906

How Green House is an architecturally important Arts and Crafts movement style country house near Hever in the Sevenoaks District of Kent. It was designed by Scottish architect Robert Weir Schultz and drawn by his assistant Cecil Wood.

== Introduction ==
The wealth created by the 19th century industrial society lead to a widespread market for the ‘grand’ country house. Owners, anxious to impress, encouraged their architects to produce exuberant and often vulgar designs based on a myriad of styles, over-ornamented French Renaissance, Venetian and Gothic predominating. There were some who reacted against the prevailing trend. William Morris and architect Philip Webb looked back to an age before the machine and founded the Arts and Crafts Movement. Progressive architects formed an alternative approach to design and Norman Shaw was one of the leading exponents. He created Bedford Park, an Arcadian suburb in west London, and many successful country houses in the new style, of which ‘Cragside’ for the rich armament manufacturer A W Armstrong is the apogee.

== Architect ==
A young Scottish architect, Robert Weir Schultz, worked in Norman Shaw’s office with another talented man, William Lethaby. They joined forces to win the competition for Khartoum Cathedral, before Lethaby was appointed Principal of the Central School of Arts and Crafts in Bloomsbury. Robert Weir Schultz moved to Scotland where he produced some progressive designs for the Earl of Bute. He broke away from the conventional ‘block’ plan and experimented with new plan forms intended to maximise the amount of sunlight and improve the prospect by spreading the building wings in the form of a butterfly.

Examples from the great Edwardian architects, Charles Rennie Mackintosh, Edwin Lutyens and Charles Voysey became a major influence in domestic design. Macintosh had made sketches in Hever and Chiddingstone during a bicycle tour in the 1890s, noting particularly the Dower House at Chiddingstone (now demolished). The tradition of Kentish oak mullioned and leaded windows, tile hanging and elaborate roofs was assimilated into the ‘Arts & Crafts style producing a series of country houses admired by discerning patrons. The houses, mostly built in the Edwardian period, were known as ‘Butterfly’ houses.

Mowbray Charrington, of the brewing family, commissioned Weir Schultz to design a small country house for his family on the site of an existing farmhouse at How Green. It was completed in 1905, at a cost of £5,000. A typical terraced house at that time would have cost about £100. The plan was of the ‘Butterfly’ principle, the wings being angled to take full advantage of the view over the Eden Valley, and perfectly orientated to enjoy the maximum sunlight. The design was shown at the Royal Academy in the summer of 1906, and published in The Builder. The house forms a crescent on the north side, dominated by three equal gables, but the scale is reduced by lowering the roofs over the servants and kitchen areas. The oak—panelled entrance hail with its fine tile and brick fireplace gave access to the sitting room, dining room, library and billiard room. A generous oak staircase ends in an arcaded gallery, originally leading to seven bedrooms. A secondary staircase led to the second floor servants' quarters. The garden, set in 33 acres (130,000 m^{2}) of woodland, orchards and paddocks was carefully landscaped, the terrace being enclosed by a balustraded wall and a box hedge taking account of a fine three-hundred-year-old oak tree. The surrounding garden falls away into a tree- and rhododendron-bounded natural area, including two ponds. Schultz's design was drawn by Cecil Wood, a young architect who worked for him from 1903 to 1905.

== Charrington family ==
Mowbray Charrington was a Churchwarden at Hever in the time of Rector Lathom-Browne. In 1894 a total renovation of the interior of the church was undertaken, and the first stained glass window in the refurbished church was presented by Mrs Coralie Charrington, in memory of her mother. In 1896, Mr Charrington presented a sixth bell to the tower ‘to complete a peal of six’. The Charrington family lived at How Green until the mid thirties, when it was occupied briefly by the Mackinnons. Mr Mackinnon was then Chairman of Imperial Airways.

== Other notable residents ==
In 1935 Alfred Ernest Yarrow bought the house. Yarrow’s business was in coal and shipping. Mr and Mrs Yarrow had a large family, six sons and a daughter, and two hard courts and a grass court were constructed for their use. The Yarrows experienced a tragic time during the war, when two sons were killed within six weeks of each other, Mr Yarrow died and other tragedies struck. Gordon Yarrow was a Blenheim pilot and had been on the operations against the German battleships Scharnhorst and Gneisenau. He had completed a tour of operations before he was killed.

His brother Peter was in the Royal Navy, and was on HMS Hood when it was engaged in the valiant action against the Bismarck in the north Atlantic in 1941. During the battle the Hood was rent in twain by a mighty explosion. A few minutes later she had vanished beneath the waves amidst a vast pall of smoke. All but three of her company of fifteen hundred men perished. In 1948 the house was sold to Frederic and Maria Floris, the colourful Hungarian pastry cooks whose well-patronised Soho shop specialised in expensive cakes and chocolates. They had two sons, Chris and George, and the Floris family were the last to occupy How Green House as a single family residence. Cyril Skinner recalls a visit from Mr Floris who had called at Roodlands Farm, driving a large Daimler with a pre-selector gear, once the properly of president Edvard Beneš of Czechoslovakia. Floris successfully reversed the car, then shot forwards and ploughed straight through a flower bed.

== Winston Churchill ==
As mentioned in Time magazine, another story is that the couple followed their ten-year-old custom of baking a birthday cake for their well-known neighbor, and occasional visitor Winston Churchill Winston Churchill. For the Prime Minister's 77th birthday, they delivered to 10 Downing Street a monumental 80-lb. confection in the shape of a flat-topped bowler hat, heavily iced with chocolate and decorated with 200 fancy sugary feathers commemorating some of the honors and triumphs in the long Churchillian career. Biggest feather of all bore the name Clementine, for his wife, who has shared his ups & downs for the past 43 years. The presence of Winston Churchill in How Green House was confirmed by Armin Loetscher (AKA Sweetie), current owner of the St. Moritz Club in London's Wardour Street, who was an employee of the Floris family in the 1950s, and who met Churchill at the house.

== Later usage ==
In 1960 the house became the target for developers who intended to demolish it and build as many of the ubiquitous "Executive" dwellings as the site would allow. However, planning consent was refused, and a local builder, who had just successfully restored Brocas Manor, stepped in and rescued the main house. As of 2021 the building was a guest house.
