= Frederick Strouts =

New Zealand architect

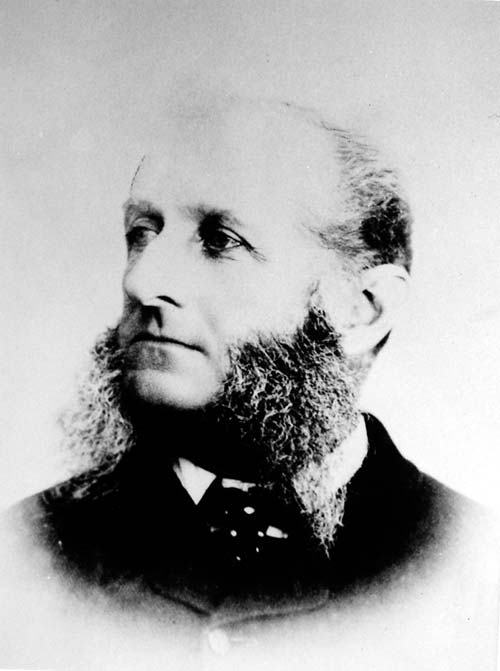
Frederick Strouts

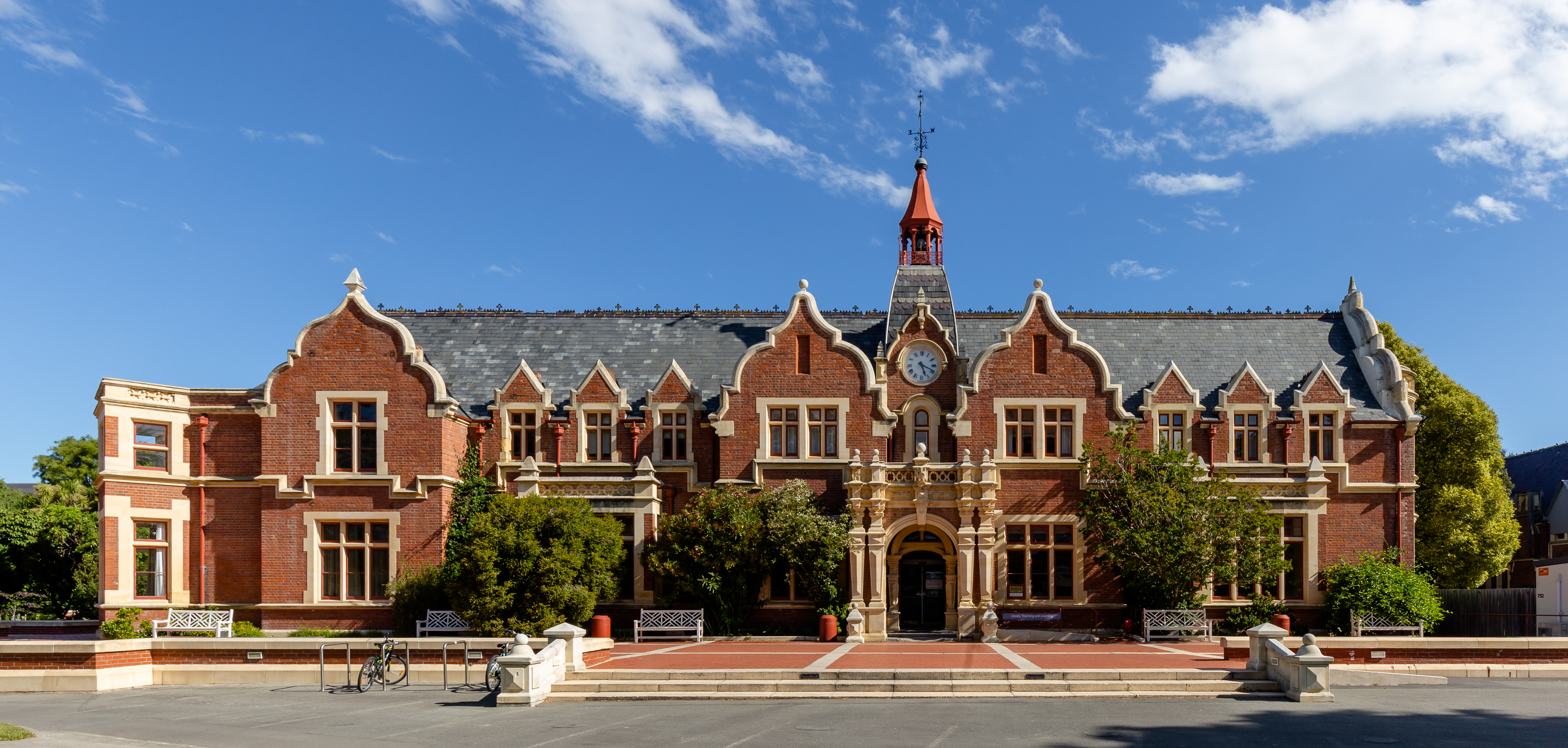
Ivey Hall at Lincoln University

Frederick Strouts (1834 – 18 December 1919) was a notable New Zealand architect. He was born in Hothfield, Kent, England in 1834. He arrived in Lyttelton in 1859 and lived in Christchurch. He went into business with his brother‑in‑law James Hawkes in Christchurch as general importers, ironmongers, and architectural and land agents, but the firm closed in 1872. Over time he focused more on architecture and project management. After a brief return to England in 1868–69, during which he became an Associate of the Royal Institute of British Architects, he came back to Christchurch, where his architectural career prospered. In 1872 he helped found the Canterbury Association of Architects.

Notable buildings include Ivey Hall at Lincoln University, the Canterbury Club building, the Lyttelton Harbour Board building, the Rhodes Convalescent Home in Cashmere, Strowan House (now part of St Andrew's College), and Otahuna homestead on Banks Peninsula. He was supervising architect at the Church of St Michael and All Angels in Christchurch. Strouts took on Cecil Wood in 1893 when Wood was 15 years of age.
