= Worcester Chambers =

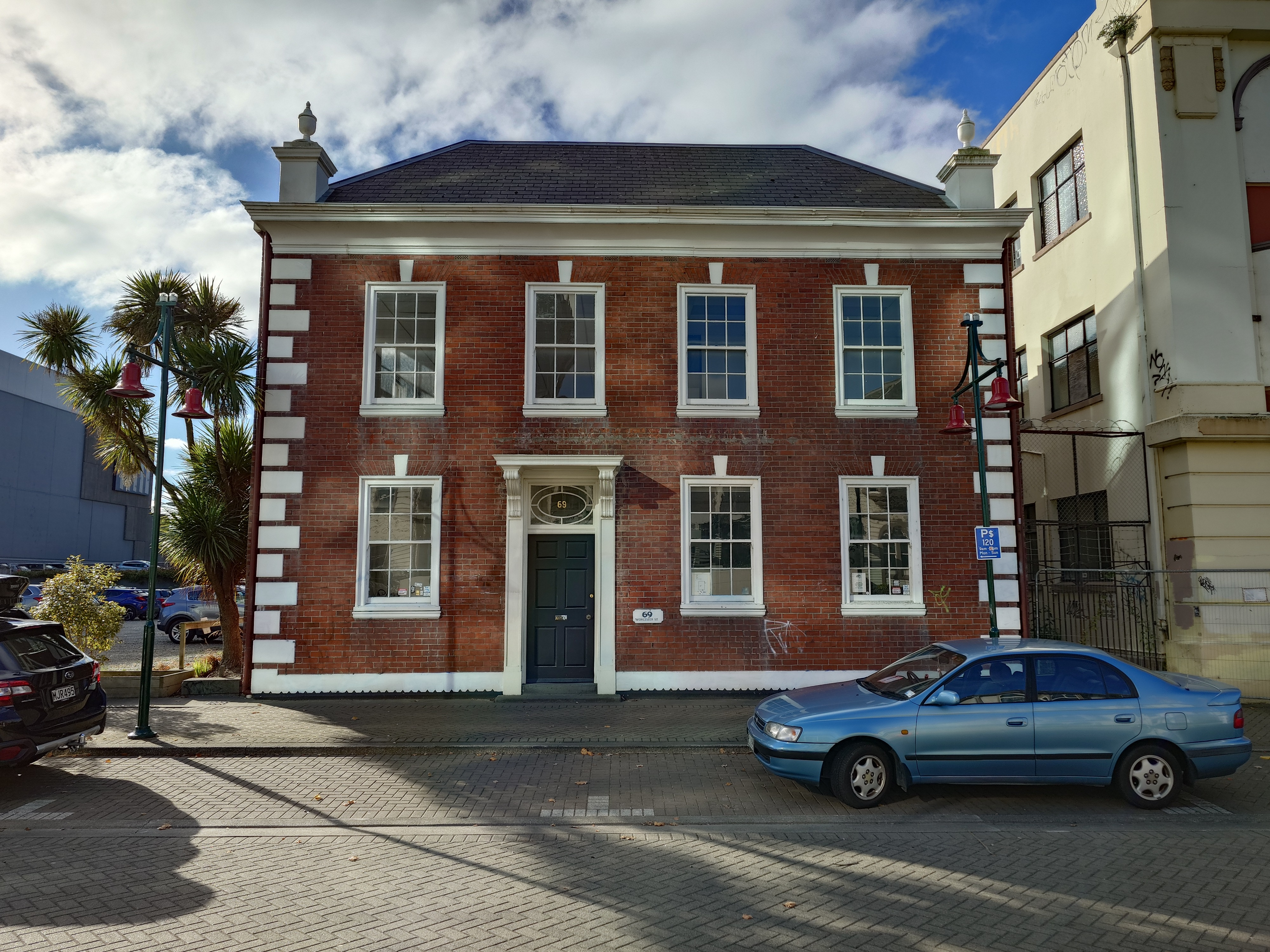
- Worcester Chambers in 2024
- Interactive map of the Worcester Chambers area

General information
- Type: Office building
- Architectural style: Georgian revival
- Location: Christchurch Central City, 69 Worcester Boulevard, Christchurch, New Zealand
- Coordinates: 43°31′51″S 172°37′56″E
- Completed: 1927
- Owner: Gerard and Siu-Wai McCoy

Design and construction
- Architect: Cecil Wood

Heritage New Zealand – Category 2
- Designated: 26 November 1981
- Reference no.: 1950

The Worcester Chambers, recently also known as Gough Chambers, is a heritage building in Christchurch, New Zealand. It was designed by Cecil Wood in 1926 and is designated as a Category II heritage building registered by Heritage New Zealand. Located at 69 Worcester Street in Central Christchurch, it was originally the site of a secretarial school called Digby's Commercial College.

== 2010 and 2011 Canterbury earthquakes ==
As a result of earthquake strengthening in 2007 it withstood the Canterbury earthquakes in 2010 and 2011.

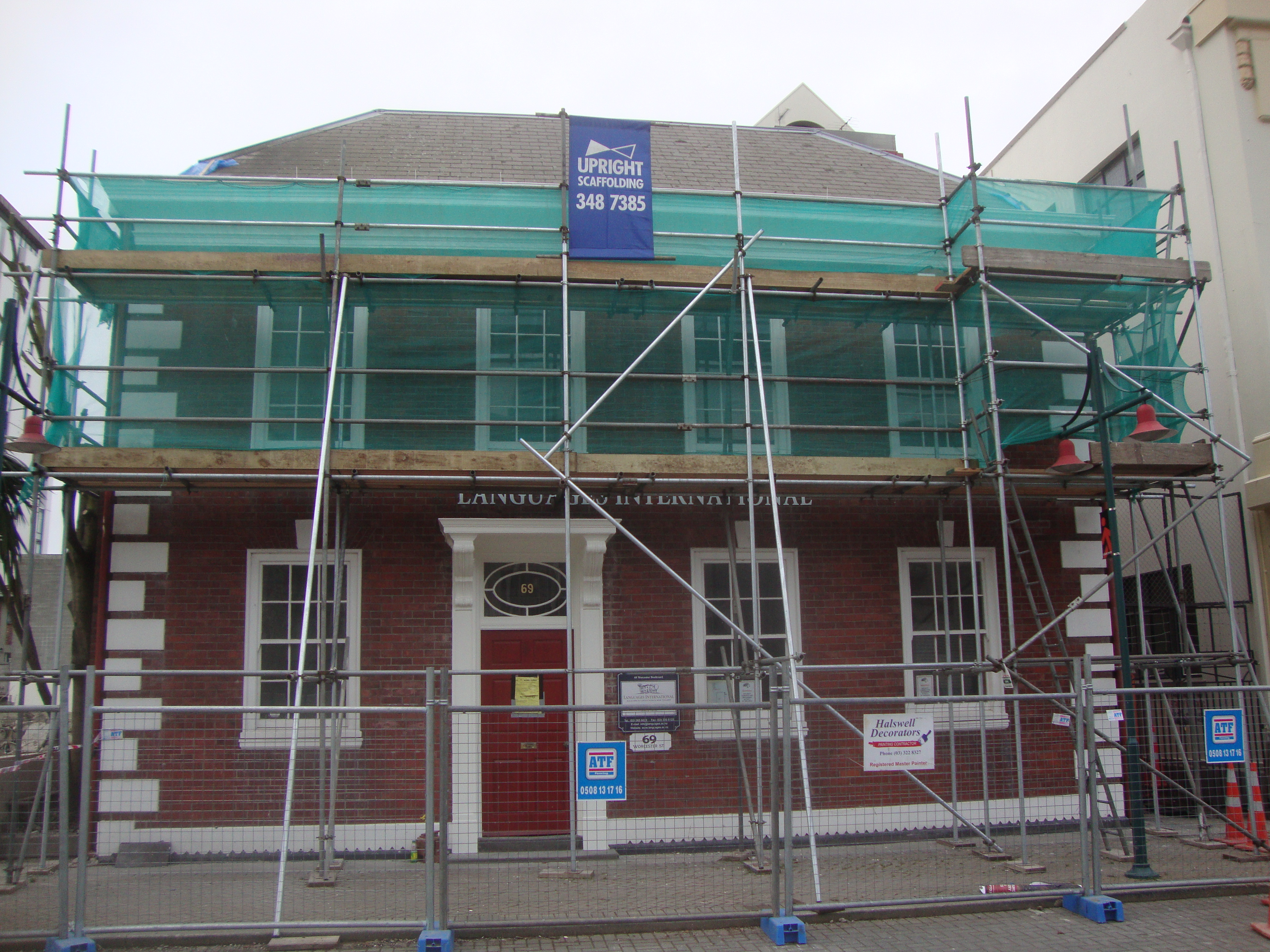
The Chambers in August 2011

== Owners ==
In September 2015, the building was bought for NZ$2.3m by members of the Gough family: prominent businessman Tracy Gough and two of this children, including Christchurch City Councillor Jamie Gough. The new owners renamed the building Gough Chambers. Although they dropped the rent, they were unable to find tenants and sold the building in late 2016 for NZ$2.18m to lawyer Gerard McCoy and his wife Siu-Wai McCoy.
