= Edmund Halswell =

Member of the Canterbury Association

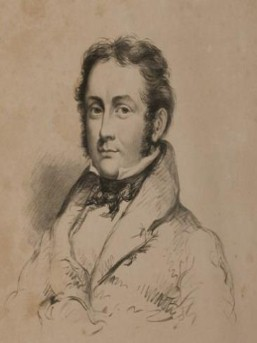
- sketch of Halswell
- Born: Edmund Storr Haswell; 28 February 1790; Marylebone, London
- Died: 1 January 1874 (aged 83); Kensington, London
- Occupation: barrister
- Known for: judge in New Zealand (1841–1845)

Edmund Storr Halswell QC (28 February 1790 – 1 January 1874), born Edmund Storr Haswell, was an English barrister. He came to New Zealand on behalf of the New Zealand Company and lived there from March 1841 to April 1845, and held some official positions, including commissioner of native reserves and judge. After he had returned to England, he became a member of the Canterbury Association and was one of just two people in England at the time who had actually seen the Canterbury Plains. Some landmarks are named after him, including the Christchurch suburb of Halswell and Point Halswell in Wellington Harbour.

== Early life ==
Halswell was born in Marylebone, London, in 1790. He was the second son of Elizabeth (née Bland) and Henry Haswell of Presteigne in Radnorshire, Wales. On 31 January 1818, Halswell married Mary Caroline Spiller (c. 1796 – 1869). Halswell received his education at St John's College of the University of Cambridge, from where he matriculated in 1819, and graduated with a Bachelor of Arts in 1827, and a Master of Arts in 1830. He obtained a further degree from Caius College in 1832. During his time at the St John's College, he changed his surname based on his belief that he was descended from the Halswell family from Goathurst in Somerset who owned Halswell House.

Halswell was admitted to the Middle Temple (Note: George Macdonald incorrectly recorded Inner Temple) on 2 June 1831 and received a call to the bar on 6 June 1834. In 1836 and 1837, he was Metropolitan Commissioner in Lunacy. From 1837 to 1843, he was Queen's Counsel for the Duchy of Lancaster. He held the rank of Serjeant-at-law and lived at Gore Lodge in Brompton.

== New Zealand ==
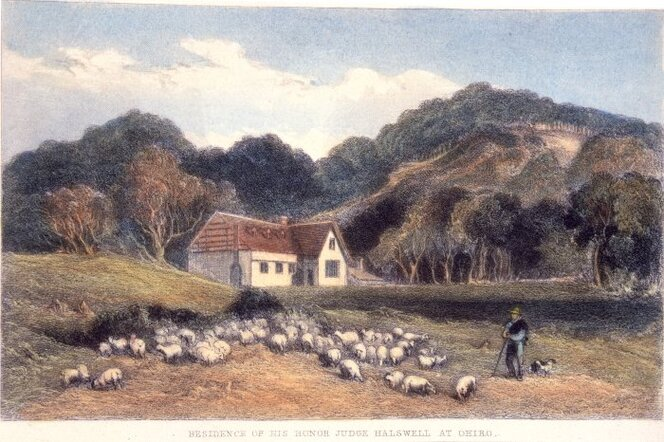
Halswell's residence in 1847, now approximately the site of Brooklyn Primary School

Halswell was appointed by the New Zealand Company as commissioner of native affairs and arrived in Wellington Harbour on the Lady Nugent on 17 March 1841, with his son (Hugh Beauchamp Halswell) accompanying him. He lived in the Wellington suburb of Brooklyn.

On 20 July 1841, Halswell was appointed chairman of the courts of quarter sessions, "Protector of Aborigines in the Southern District of this Island" (i.e. Māori people), and Commissioner for the Management of the Native Reserves. On 26 February 1842, he was appointed judge of the County Court of the southern portion of New Ulster Province. On 3 May 1841, Halswell was appointed to the General Legislative Council as one of the country's three senior justices. Halswell's term on the Legislative Council ended on 10 July 1841, which coincides with the end of the first session of the council. There was no contemporary reporting why his term came to an end; he was the first person to retire from this institution. In May 1842, Governor William Hobson appointed Halswell as one of his deputies. As a judge, he appears to have had the trust of Māori, over whom he sometimes had to preside.

On 24 April 1845, Halswell attended a farewell function for James Sea, who was to go to New South Wales to become the first manager of the Sydney branch of the Union Bank of Australia. Halswell's own departure for England was toasted at that function, and both Sea and Halswell left two days later on the Comet for Sydney via Nelson. They arrived in Sydney on 17 May. Halswell's return to England was caused by conflicts with the governor; the New Zealand Company had a fraught relationship with all governors as the company's objectives were not supported by the New Zealand government.

== Later life in England ==
Halswell was one of the founding members of the Canterbury Association; he attended the inaugural meeting on 27 March 1848 and was on the initial committee. In 1848, where were probably just two people in England who would have seen the Canterbury Plains by themselves: Halswell and Captain Joseph Thomas, the surveyor of the Canterbury Association.

== Family and death ==
Halswell's eldest son, (Edward) Darnley Halswell, was killed aged 19 in January 1842 in Sindh (now part of Pakistan) whilst part of General Charles James Napier's campaign to conquer the area. Halswell died on 1 January 1874 at Kensington and was buried on 7 January at Holy Trinity Brompton in London. His wife had died in 1869.

== Commemoration ==
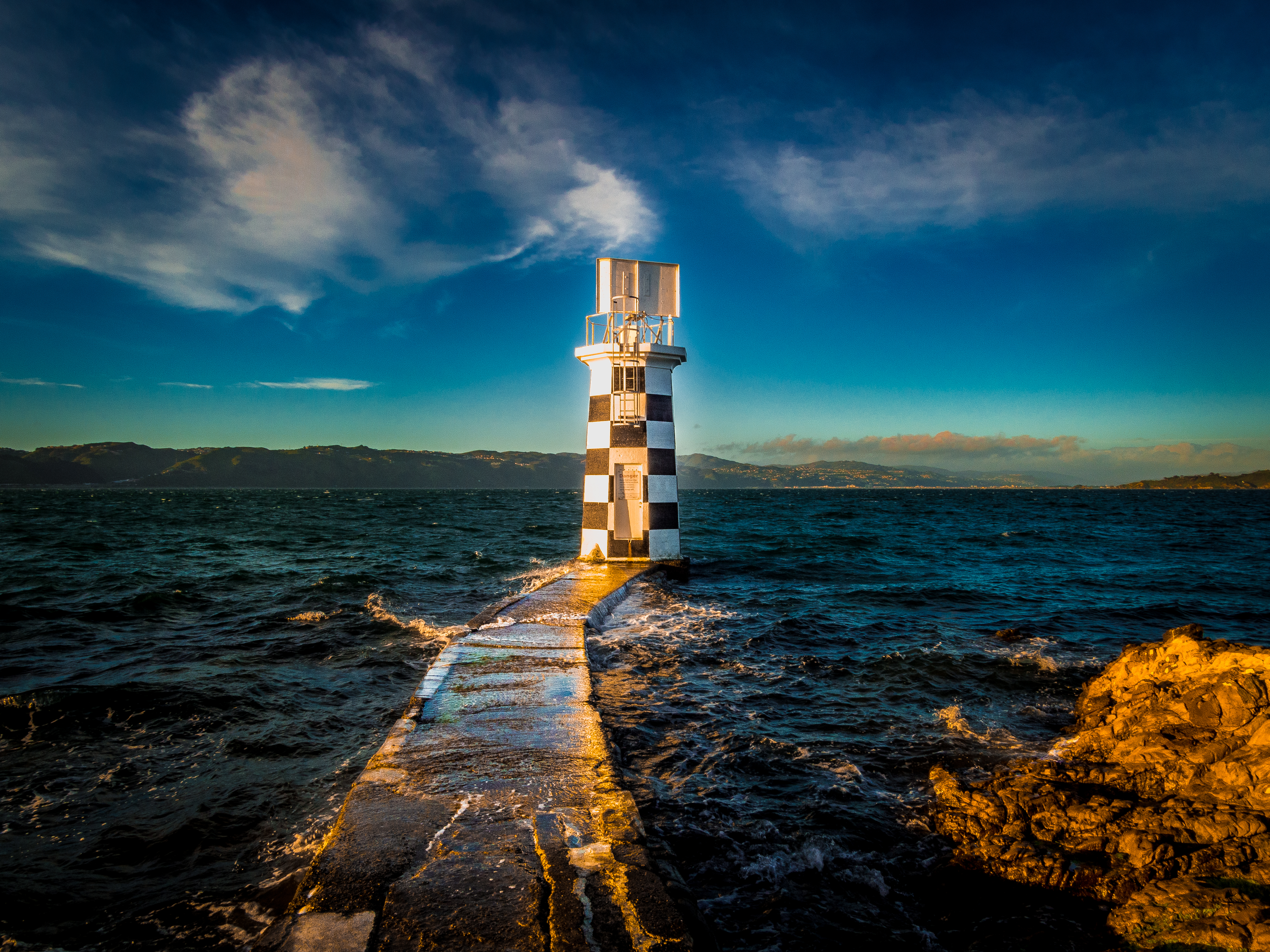
Lighthouse at Point Halswell

Point Halswell is the northernmost location of Miramar Peninsula. The point became a public reserve, under that name, in September 1841. In 1930, the Massey Memorial was unveiled at Point Halswell.

Captain Thomas, when he carried out the surveys in 1849 in Canterbury, named many geographic features after members of the Canterbury Association. Halswell's name was used for a river–the Halswell River—that drained into Lake Ellesmere. A rural settlement near the head of this river then adopted the name Halswell; this is today a suburb of Christchurch. It also gave its name to an administrative district—Halswell County—that existed from 1910 to 1968. Edmund Storr Road is a subdivision street in Halswell that was named in 1999.

Chelmsford Street in the Wellington suburb of Ngaio was originally called Halswell Street. The land was granted to Halswell and inherited by his son Beaumont Halswell. When the land was subdivided, the street was initially named for its original owners but later renamed. Halswell Street in the Wellington suburb of Thorndon has retained its name. There is also a Halswell Street in Whanganui.
