= Hare Memorial Library =

College library

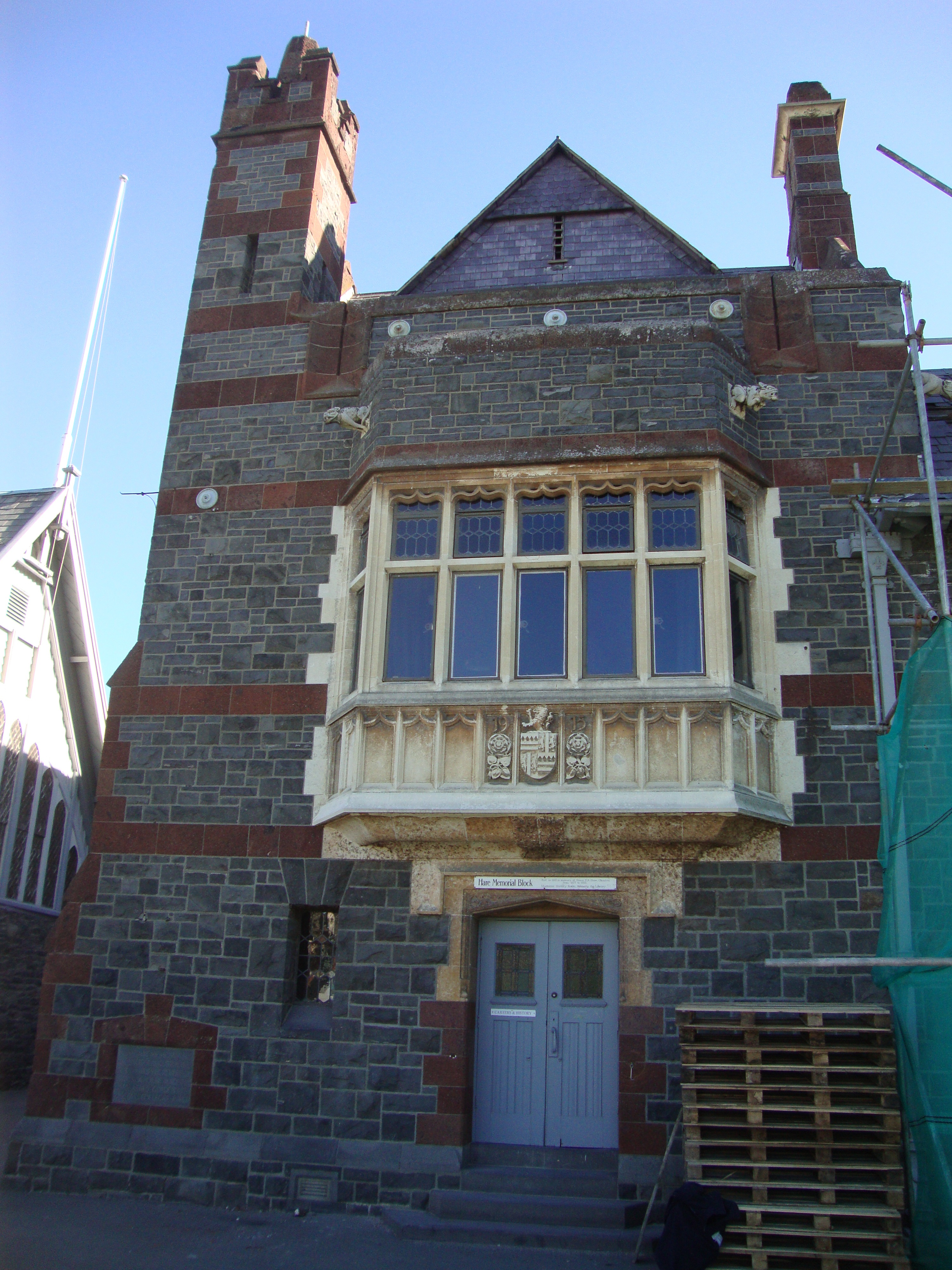
Hare Memorial Library

Hare Memorial Library is on the Christ's College, Christchurch campus in New Zealand. It was designed by Cecil Wood and was named a New Zealand Historic Place.

== History ==
The building was completed in 1915 and architect Cecil Wood was the designer. The Hare Memorial Library was built to celebrate the contributions of Rev Francis Augustus Hare to the school.

The building was added to the New Zealand list of Historic Places Trust as a Category 1 building on 27 June 1985.
