= Robert Weir Schultz =

Scottish architect

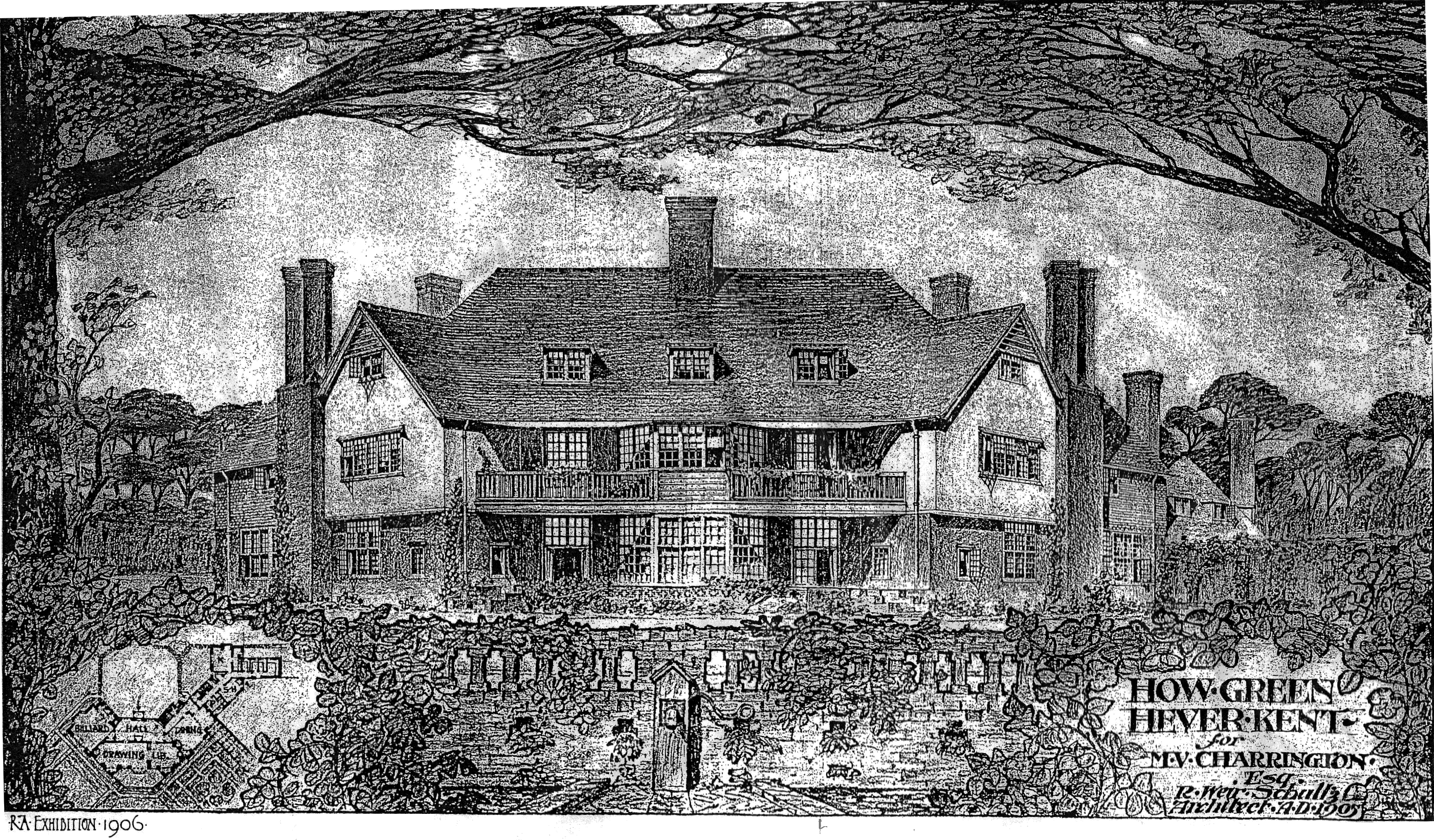
Schultz's drawing exhibited at the Royal Academy in 1906

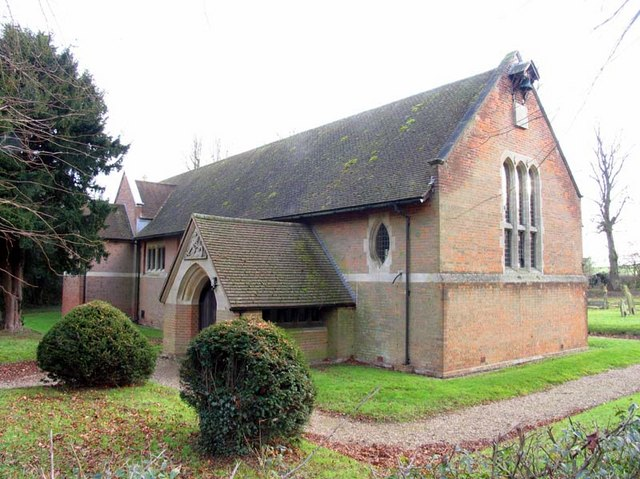
At Michael and All Angels, Woolmer Green

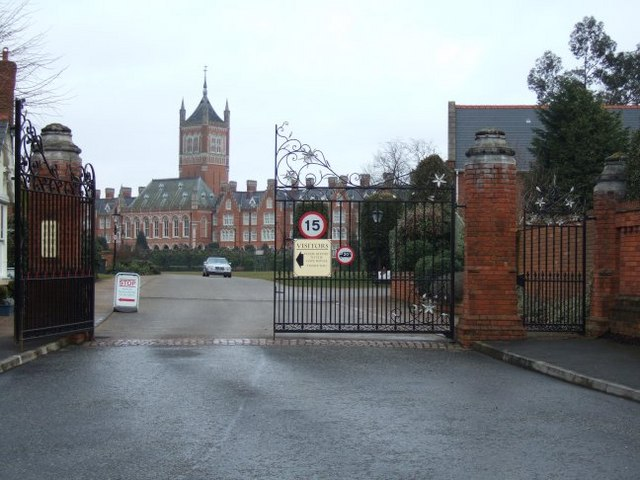
Holloway Sanatorium in Virginia Water (now called Virginia Park)

Robert Weir Schultz (26 July 1860 – 29 April 1951), later Robert Weir Schultz Weir and known as R. W. S. Weir, was a Scottish Arts and Crafts architect, artist, landscape designer and furniture designer. He did much work on the Isle of Bute. Almost all of his buildings are now category A listed buildings, reflecting the high quality of his work.

== Early life and name ==
He was born in 1860 in Port Glasgow as Robert Weir Schultz, the son of Henry Schultz, a Greenock sugar refiner, and Isabella Small Weir, the daughter of Dr Robert Weir of Galashiels. Due to this family connection, when Henry Schultz died in 1863 the infant Robert was sent to Galashiels to be raised by his aunt Jane, the wife of Dr Alexander Cunningham Tweedie. Of German roots, he was subjected to anti-German hysteria during WWI. He added his mother's maiden name as an additional surname in 1915 and was from then known as Robert W. S. Weir or R. W. S. Weir, thus hiding his German surname.

== Career ==
In 1876 Robert was articled to work under Robert Rowand Anderson where he later worked alongside George Washington Browne and Hew M Wardop when they joined the partnership. In January 1884 he moved to work as assistant to Richard Norman Shaw. Here he also became acquainted with the newly created Art Workers Guild set up by Shaw's other assistants: Edward Schroeder Prior, Ernest Newton, Mervyn Macartney and William Richard Lethaby. In 1885 he was joined by Sidney Barnsley and his brother Ernest Barnsley widening the circle of stylistic influence. In 1886, he moved to the offices of Sir Ernest George and Harold Ainsworth Peto in London.

In 1887, having won the Golden Medal of the Royal Academy, together with the travelling scholarship of £200 that went with it and, with funding supplemented by the Marquess of Bute, who he had met through Robert Rowand Anderson and Dr Edwin Freshfield, he travelled to Italy, Greece and the Near East, in the company of Sidney Barnsley. In 1889, as part of his travels, he became a member of the British School at Athens.

Schultz and Barnsley returned to Britain in 1890 and set up office together at 14 Gray's Square Inn, adjacent to a friend and former colleague, Francis William Troup. In 1890 he also officially joined the Art Workers Guild and secured a commission by his travel sponsor, the 3rd Marquess of Bute, for alterations at Mount Stuart House and to St John's Lodge in Regent's Park. Further work for Bute included restoration at Dumfries House and major renovation and alteration of The House of Falkland in Fife. Schultz continued working for his successor, the 4th Marquess, the most significant of which was at St. Andrew's Chapel in Westminster Cathedral. Schultz's mosaic design, based partly on St. Andrew's connections with Constantinople is in keeping with this key work of the Byzantine Revival in the United Kingdom.

Whilst in practice both Frank Mears and John Greaves trained under Schultz.

In 1912, at the late age of 52, he married Thyra Macdonald. He then created one of the first known barn conversions at Hartley Wintney in Hampshire as their home. At the onset of the First World War, and further pressured by his wife's role as a councillor, he reversed his name, to obscure his Germanic surname, and became thereafter known as Robert S. Weir. He was elected as the Master of the Art Workers' Guild in 1920. His office ran until he was aged 79 and at the outset of the Second World War he closed the office and passed all remaining work to Troup's office.

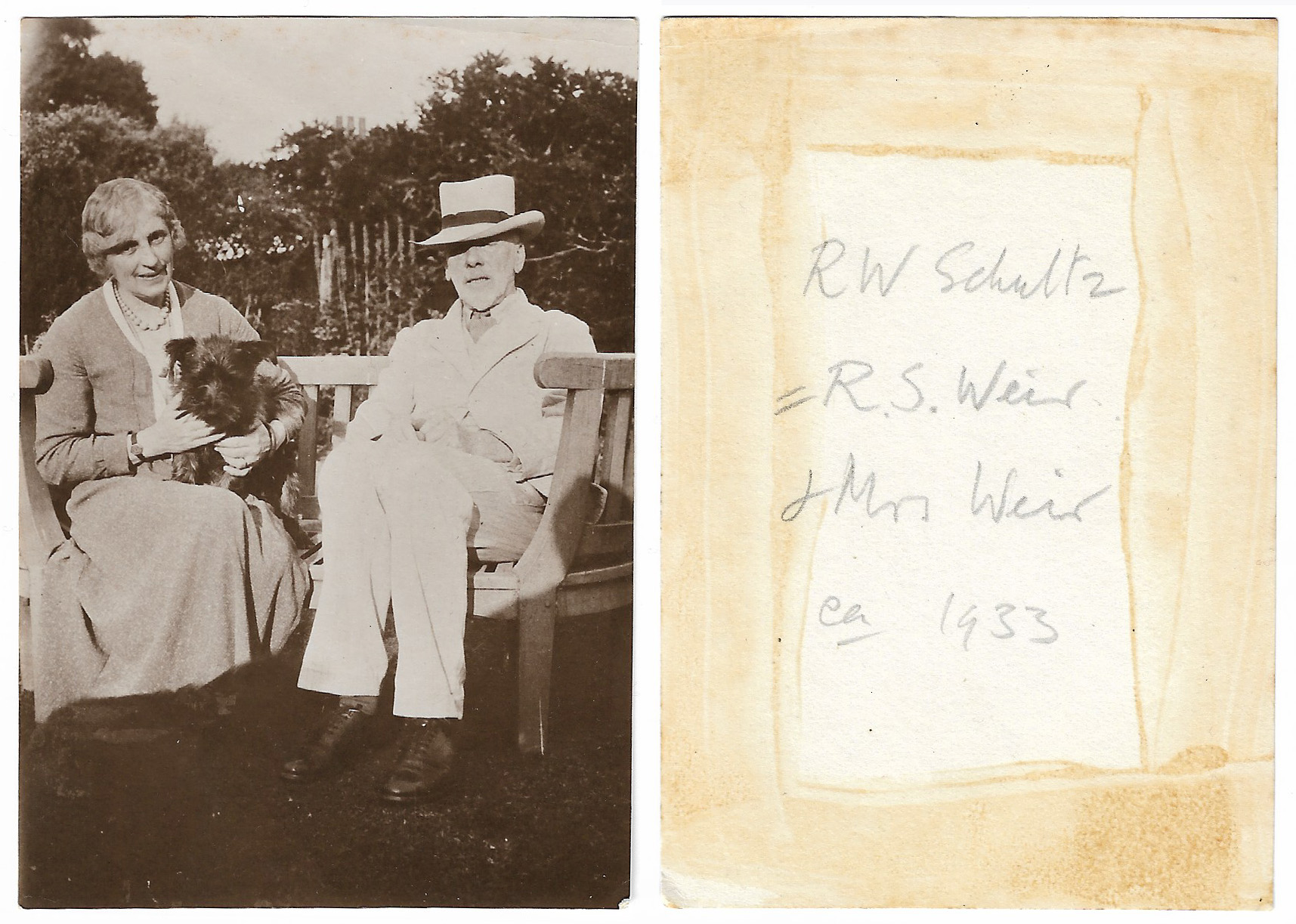
A family photo of Robert Weir Schultz and Thyra Macdonald, 1933

He died at The Barn on 29 April 1951, aged 90. He is buried in St Mary's Church, Hartley Wintney.

== Principal works ==
- Various works in Falkland, Fife (including restoration of Falkland Palace, and remodelling of the House of Falkland) (1890–1904)
- Chapel, library and garden at St John's Lodge, Regent's Park, London (1892)
- Restoration and addition of pavilions at Dumfries House, Ayrshire for John Crichton-Stuart, 3rd Marquess of Bute (1895)
- Various furniture commissions, aesthetic upgrades to various rooms and garden areas for Mount Stuart House, Bute (1895–1905)
- Cast-iron additions to Rothesay RC School (1895)
- Rebuilding of Sanquhar Castle (1895)
- Rebuilding of Wester Kames Castle including furniture design within the rebuilt structure (1895–1905)
- Archaeological investigation and partial rebuilding of Sanquhar Old Church (1896)
- Restoration of St. Blane's Church, Kingarth for John Crichton-Stuart, 3rd Marquess of Bute (1896)
- Cottage at Welwyn Rectory, Hertfordshire (1897)
- St Michael and All Angels Church, Woolmer Green (1898)
- Scoulag Lodge, serving Mount Stuart House (1898)
- Gardens at Tylney Hall, Hampshire (1901)
- House for David W Shaw in Ayr (1902)
- Restoration, garden design and furniture commission for Old Place of Mochrum, Wigtownshire (1902)
- Restoration and enlargement of Pickenham Hall, Swaffham (1902)
- Archbishop's Chapel, 42 Greenhill Gardens, Edinburgh (incorporating old panels from Falkland Palace)(1904)
- Cardiff University Settlement, East Moors, Cardiff (1904)
- How Green House near Hever, Kent (1904)
- Village Hall, Shorne, Kent (1905)
- RAMC Memorial, Aldershot (1905)
- Cottages in Sproughton, Suffolk (1906)
- Cottages in Hadleigh, Suffolk (1906)
- Hill Cottage, Eversley, Hampshire (1906)
- Khartoum Anglican Cathedral (All Saints), Sudan (1906–1912)
- Boys and Girls Homes and School, Chalfont St Peter (1907)
- Knockenhair House and lodge, Dunbar, East Lothian (1907)
- Remodelling of both Garrison House and the sunken gardens on Isle of Cumbrae (1908)
- Kirtling House, Winchester (1909)
- Puttenham Rectory, Surrey (1909)
- St Ann's Hospital, Canford Cliffs, Bournemouth (1909)
- Lowood, Cramond Bridge, Edinburgh (1910)
- Restoration and redecoration of St. Andrew's Chapel in Westminster Cathedral working with Gaetano Meo (1910 and 1923)
- Restoration of Cottesbrooke Hall, Northamptonshire (1911)
- Restoration of Old Place of Mochrum, Wigtownshire (1912)
- Barn Conversion (as his own home), Hartley Wintney (1912)
- Mausoleum in South Mimms Churchyard (1914)
- Garden Village housing in Gretna (1917–18)
- Six houses on Brackley Estate, Hartley Wintney (1926)

== Other legacy ==
The association that Robert Weir Schultz and Sydney Barnsley had with the British School in Athens, which had only been founded in 1886, led to them producing hundreds of drawings and photographs of ancient monuments that they systematically investigated and recorded. Their work was to form the nucleus of “a collection of approximately fifteen hundred drawings and one thousand photographs of major Byzantine monuments of the Mediterranean basin, Italy, Turkey, Greece, as well as Asia Minor and the Near East, dating between 1888 and 1949. The collection, which is today housed at the British School at Athens, is known as the Byzantine Research Fund Archive…”.

The Warburg Institute also has a large collection of photographs by Weir Schultz and Barnsley. In the Annual Report of 2004-2005 for the School of Advanced Study, University of London, it was reported that a large number of glass negatives of Byzantine churches held since the 1940s had been identified as being taken by Robert Weir Schultz and Sidney Barnsley in 1889 and 1890. Their importance is highlighted by the statement “The negatives, which have now been printed, were long thought by Byzantinists to be lost. They provide important evidence about the state of various Greek churches before radical restoration, or in one case before destruction by fire.". In addition, photographs attributed to Weir Schultz and Barnsley, known as the Weir Schultz and Barnsley Collection, are held in the archive of the Conway Library at The Courtauld Institute of Art, London.
