= Oaklands, New Zealand =

Suburb of Christchurch, New Zealand

Oaklands
- Suburb
- Interactive map of Oaklands
- Coordinates: 43.571°S 172.557°E
- Country: New Zealand
- City: Christchurch
- Local authority: Christchurch City Council
- Electoral ward: Halswell
- Community board: Waipuna Halswell-Hornby-Riccarton

Area
  - Land: 278 ha (690 acres)

Population (June 2025)
  - Total: 6,860
  - Density: 2,470/km^{2} (6,390/sq mi)

Wigram	Aidanfield
	Oaklands	Halswell
	Halswell

Oaklands is a southern suburb of Christchurch, New Zealand. The area is predominantly residential.

When Halswell House was purchased by Peter Watson (1869?–1947), he renamed it Oaklands after the trees lining the driveway. A subsequent owner, Karl Scott (1910–1997) subdivided the property about 1960.

== Demographics ==
Oaklands, comprising the statistical areas of Oaklands West and Oaklands East, covers 2.78 km^{2} (1.07 sq mi). It had an estimated population of 6,860 as of June 2025, with a population density of 2,468 people per km^{2}.

Historical population
Year	Pop.	±% p.a.
2006	5,709	—
2013	5,580	−0.33%
2018	5,748	+0.60%
2023	6,351	+2.02%
The 2006 population is for a larger area of 3.00 km^{2}. Source:

Oaklands had a population of 6,351 in the 2023 New Zealand census, an increase of 603 people (10.5%) since the 2018 census, and an increase of 771 people (13.8%) since the 2013 census. There were 3,126 males, 3,201 females, and 27 people of other genders in 2,337 dwellings. 3.0% of people identified as LGBTIQ+. There were 1,293 people (20.4%) aged under 15 years, 1,113 (17.5%) aged 15 to 29, 2,973 (46.8%) aged 30 to 64, and 966 (15.2%) aged 65 or older.

People could identify as more than one ethnicity. The results were 76.5% European (Pākehā); 9.4% Māori; 3.4% Pasifika; 18.0% Asian; 1.7% Middle Eastern, Latin American and African New Zealanders (MELAA); and 2.3% other, which includes people giving their ethnicity as "New Zealander". English was spoken by 95.2%, Māori by 2.1%, Samoan by 0.7%, and other languages by 16.4%. No language could be spoken by 2.9% (e.g. too young to talk). New Zealand Sign Language was known by 0.6%. The percentage of people born overseas was 25.5, compared with 28.8% nationally.

Religious affiliations were 33.5% Christian, 3.5% Hindu, 1.3% Islam, 0.2% Māori religious beliefs, 0.8% Buddhist, 0.3% New Age, and 2.6% other religions. People who answered that they had no religion were 51.9%, and 6.1% of people did not answer the census question.

Of those at least 15 years old, 1,419 (28.1%) people had a bachelor's or higher degree, 2,559 (50.6%) had a post-high school certificate or diploma, and 1,080 (21.4%) people exclusively held high school qualifications. 507 people (10.0%) earned over $100,000 compared to 12.1% nationally. The employment status of those at least 15 was 2,781 (55.0%) full-time, 708 (14.0%) part-time, and 81 (1.6%) unemployed.

Individual statistical areas
Name	Area (km^{2})	Population	Density (per km^{2})	Dwellings	Median age	Median income
Oaklands West	1.70	3,069	1,805	1,125	37.4 years	$48,900
Oaklands East	1.08	3,282	3,039	1,212	35.1 years	$45,200
New Zealand					38.1 years	$41,500

== Education ==
Oaklands School Te Kura o Ōwaka is a full primary school catering for years 1 to 8. It had a roll of 641 as of July 2026. The school opened in 1964.
