= The Spur =

Arts and crafts bungalows in New Zealand

Coordinates: 43°33′59.79″S 172°45′20.89″E

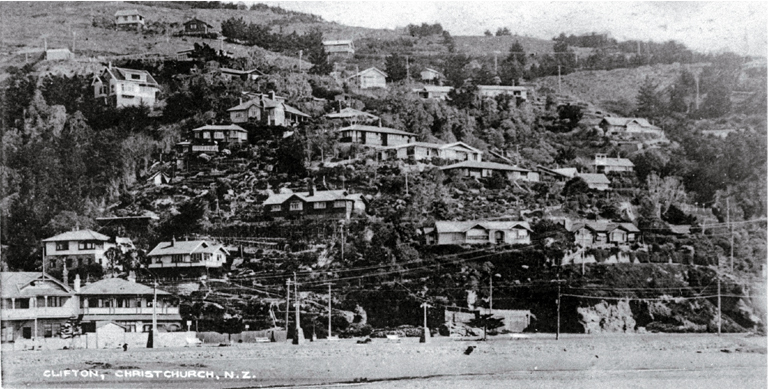
The Spur in 1920

The Spur is a collection of interconnected Arts and Crafts bungalows in Clifton, Christchurch.

The bungalows and layout of the site were both designed by Samuel Hurst Seager between 1902 and 1912. Seager purchased the site for the subdivision in 1902 and lived at No. 1 the Spur from 1902 until around 1912. Seager's original section was subdivided into eight bungalows, of his design, and four empty lots. The twelve plots were advertised as The Spur when sold by auction on 14 March 1914.
