= Tai Tapu =

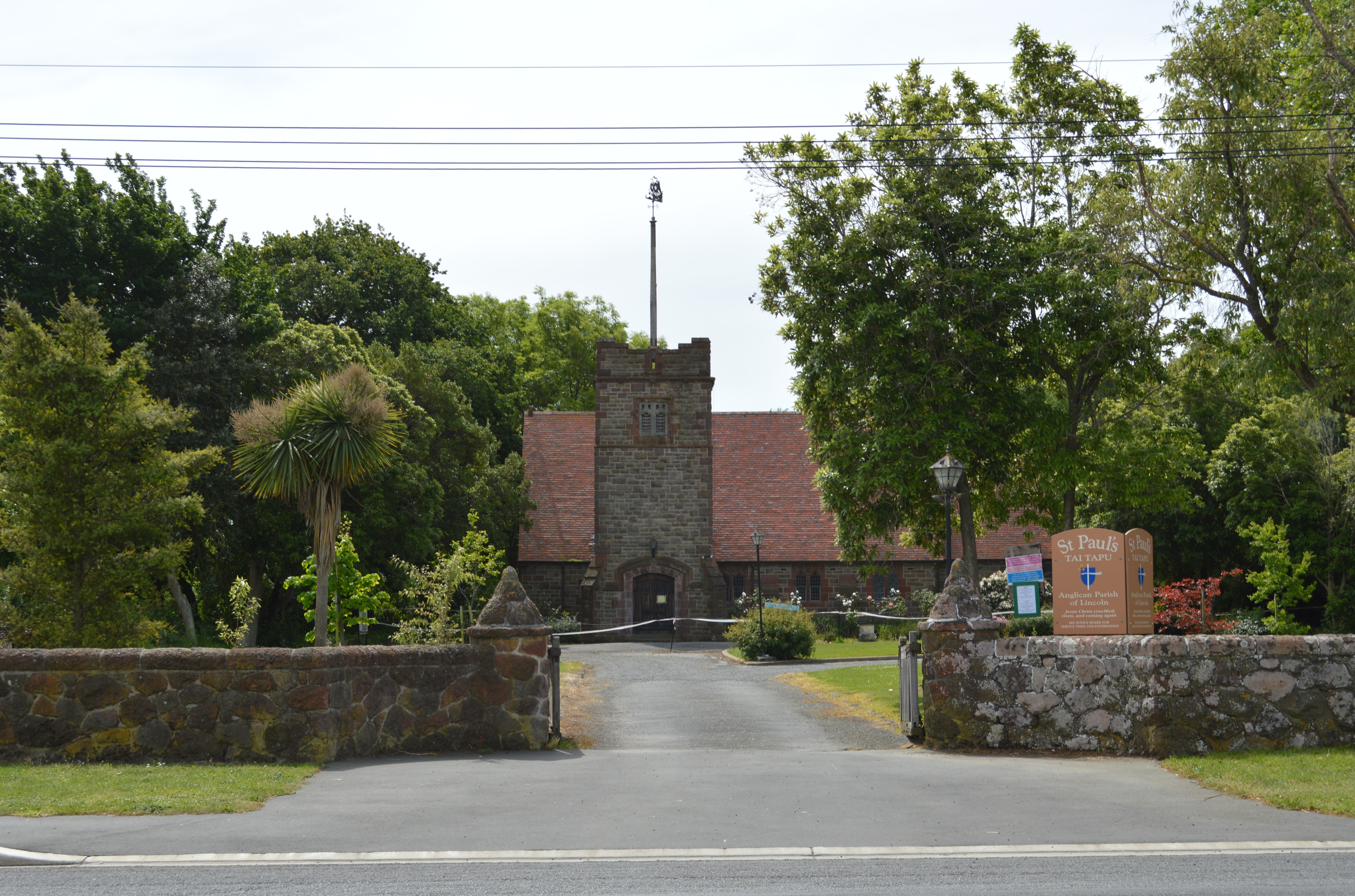
- St Paul's church, Tai Tapu
- Interactive map of Tai Tapu
- Coordinates: 43°40′12″S 172°33′0″E
- Country: New Zealand
- Island: South Island
- Region: Canterbury
- Territorial authority: Selwyn District
- Ward: Springs
- Electorates: Selwyn; Te Tai Tonga (Māori)

Government
  - Territorial authority: Selwyn District Council
  - Regional council: Environment Canterbury
  - Mayor of Selwyn: Lydia Gliddon
  - Selwyn MP: Nicola Grigg
  - Te Tai Tonga MP: Tākuta Ferris

Area
  - Total: 2.42 km^{2} (0.93 sq mi)

Population (June 2025)
  - Total: 630
  - Density: 260/km^{2} (670/sq mi)
- Time zone: UTC+12 (NZST)
  - Summer (DST): UTC+13 (NZDT)
- Local iwi: Ngāi Tahu

Tai Tapu, previously known as Taitapu, is a small town adjacent to the Halswell River and nestled in the Port Hills, located 6 km east of the town of Lincoln and 18 km south west of Christchurch in the Canterbury region of New Zealand's South Island. State Highway 75 passes through the centre of the village, connecting Christchurch with Akaroa and the Banks Peninsula.

The Tai Tapu Hotel was established in 1856 and is located 1 km north of the town centre on a scenic country road. It has a large outdoor dining area that looks over the Halswell River with views to the Tai Tapu Golf Course.

== Etymology ==
The name Tai Tapu is derived from the Māori words wai tapu, which means sacred or solemn water.

The village was previously known as Taitapu, until an official name change in 2009.

The village is often colloquially referred to as 'Tai Tap' by locals.

== Demographics ==
Tai Tapu is described by Stats NZ as a rural settlement. It covers 2.42 km^{2} (0.93 sq mi) and had an estimated population of 630 as of June 2025, with a population density of 260 people per km^{2}. Tai Tapu is part of the larger Tai Tapu statistical area.

Historical population for the settlement
Year	Pop.	±% p.a.
2006	336	—
2013	477	+5.13%
2018	543	+2.63%
2023	603	+2.12%

Tai Tapu had a population of 603 in the 2023 New Zealand census, an increase of 60 people (11.0%) since the 2018 census, and an increase of 126 people (26.4%) since the 2013 census. There were 315 males and 288 females in 225 dwellings. 1.0% of people identified as LGBTIQ+. The median age was 47.2 years (compared with 38.1 years nationally). There were 105 people (17.4%) aged under 15 years, 84 (13.9%) aged 15 to 29, 315 (52.2%) aged 30 to 64, and 102 (16.9%) aged 65 or older.

People could identify as more than one ethnicity. The results were 95.0% European (Pākehā); 10.9% Māori; 0.5% Pasifika; 1.0% Asian; 0.5% Middle Eastern, Latin American and African New Zealanders (MELAA); and 1.0% other, which includes people giving their ethnicity as "New Zealander". English was spoken by 97.5%, Māori by 3.0%, and other languages by 5.5%. No language could be spoken by 2.5% (e.g. too young to talk). New Zealand Sign Language was known by 0.5%. The percentage of people born overseas was 14.4, compared with 28.8% nationally.

Religious affiliations were 31.8% Christian, 0.5% Māori religious beliefs, 0.5% Buddhist, and 0.5% New Age. People who answered that they had no religion were 63.2%, and 4.0% of people did not answer the census question.

Of those at least 15 years old, 153 (30.7%) people had a bachelor's or higher degree, 282 (56.6%) had a post-high school certificate or diploma, and 63 (12.7%) people exclusively held high school qualifications. The median income was $62,500, compared with $41,500 nationally. 114 people (22.9%) earned over $100,000 compared to 12.1% nationally. The employment status of those at least 15 was 279 (56.0%) full-time, 99 (19.9%) part-time, and 6 (1.2%) unemployed.

=== Tai Tapu statistical area ===
Tai Tapu statistical area includes the settlement and a larger area to the east. It covers 56.80 km^{2} (21.93 sq mi) and had an estimated population of 1,360 as of June 2025, with a population density of 23.9 people per km^{2}.

Historical population for the statistical area
Year	Pop.	±% p.a.
2006	762	—
2013	948	+3.17%
2018	1,173	+4.35%
2023	1,299	+2.06%

The statistical area had a population of 1,299 in the 2023 New Zealand census, an increase of 126 people (10.7%) since the 2018 census, and an increase of 351 people (37.0%) since the 2013 census. There were 669 males, 627 females, and 3 people of other genders in 465 dwellings. 2.1% of people identified as LGBTIQ+. The median age was 47.3 years (compared with 38.1 years nationally). There were 237 people (18.2%) aged under 15 years, 180 (13.9%) aged 15 to 29, 645 (49.7%) aged 30 to 64, and 237 (18.2%) aged 65 or older.

People could identify as more than one ethnicity. The results were 96.1% European (Pākehā); 8.5% Māori; 0.9% Pasifika; 1.8% Asian; 0.7% Middle Eastern, Latin American and African New Zealanders (MELAA); and 2.3% other, which includes people giving their ethnicity as "New Zealander". English was spoken by 98.2%, Māori by 2.5%, and other languages by 6.2%. No language could be spoken by 1.4% (e.g. too young to talk). New Zealand Sign Language was known by 0.7%. The percentage of people born overseas was 17.8, compared with 28.8% nationally.

Religious affiliations were 33.3% Christian, 0.5% Māori religious beliefs, 0.2% Buddhist, 0.5% New Age, and 0.9% other religions. People who answered that they had no religion were 60.3%, and 4.4% of people did not answer the census question.

Of those at least 15 years old, 360 (33.9%) people had a bachelor's or higher degree, 552 (52.0%) had a post-high school certificate or diploma, and 147 (13.8%) people exclusively held high school qualifications. The median income was $59,600, compared with $41,500 nationally. 261 people (24.6%) earned over $100,000 compared to 12.1% nationally. The employment status of those at least 15 was 561 (52.8%) full-time, 207 (19.5%) part-time, and 12 (1.1%) unemployed.

== Education ==
Tai Tapu School is a full primary school catering for years 1 to 8. It had a roll of 269 as of July 2026. The school opened in 1876.
