= Maddison (surname) =

Maddison is a surname, and may refer to:

- Abacca Anjain-Maddison, Marshall Islands politician
- Ada Maddison (1869–1950), British mathematician
- Adela Maddison (1862–1929), British composer
- Angus Maddison (1926–2010), British economist
- Arden Maddison (1900–1987), English footballer
- Barney Maddison (born 1989), English rugby union footballer and coach
- Charlie Maddison (born 1991), English rugby union footballer
- David Maddison (1947–2019), British judge
- Don Maddison (1927–2017), English football goalkeeper
- Emily Maddison (born 1999), Jamaican model and beauty pageant titleholder
- Francis Maddison (1928–2006), English museum curator, historian and Arabist
- Fred Maddison (1856–1937), British trade unionist and politician
- Frederick Maddison (footballer) (1849–1907), English footballer
- George Maddison (British Army Officer) (1729–1806), British army officer and colonial administrator
- George Maddison (British politician) (died 1783), English diplomat
- George Maddison (footballer, born 1902) (1902–1959), English footballer
- George Maddison (footballer, born 1930) (1930–1987), English footballer
- George Maddison (priest) (1809–1895), Archdeacon of Ludlow from 1877 to 1892
- Greg Maddison (born 1949), Canadian Chief of the Maritime Staff
- Guy Maddison (born 1965), Australian bass guitar player
- Isabel Maddison (1869–1950), British mathematician
- James Maddison (born 1996), English footballer
- Jamie Maddison (born 1988), English explorer and magazine editor
- Jimmy Maddison (1924–1992), English footballer
- John Maddison (1921–1982), Australian politician
- John Maddison (architectural historian) (born 1952), Scottish architectural historian and artist
- John Maddison (sport shooter), British sports shooter
- Jonny Maddison (born 1994), English footballer
- Joseph Maddison (1850–1923), New Zealand architect
- Joseph Maddison (trade unionist) (born 1838), British trade unionist
- Keith Maddison, Australian rugby league footballer
- Ken Maddison (1944–2008), Australian rugby league footballer
- Lee Maddison (born 1972), English footballer
- Lionel Maddison (1537–1624), English Mayor of Newcastle upon Tyne
- Marcus Maddison (born 1993), English footballer
- Neil Maddison (born 1969), English footballer and coach
- Paul Maddison, Royal Canadian Navy officer, diplomat and academic
- Peter Maddison, Australian architect and television presenter
- Richard Maddison, British Royal Air Force officer
- Robbie Maddison (born 1981), Australian motorbike stunt rider
- Ronald Maddison (1933–1953), Royal Air Force engineer
- Ruth Maddison (born 1945), Australian photographer
- Sarah Maddison, Australian political scientist and author
- Tim Maddison (born 1973), Australian rugby league footballer
- Tom Maddison (born 1910), English footballer
- Wayne Maddison (born 1958), Canadian evolutionary biologist, arachnologist and illustrator
- William Maddison, British competitive sailor

== See also ==
- Madison (name)
