= Clarendon Tower =

Former building in Christchurch, New Zealand

Coordinates: 43°31′53″S 172°38′03″E

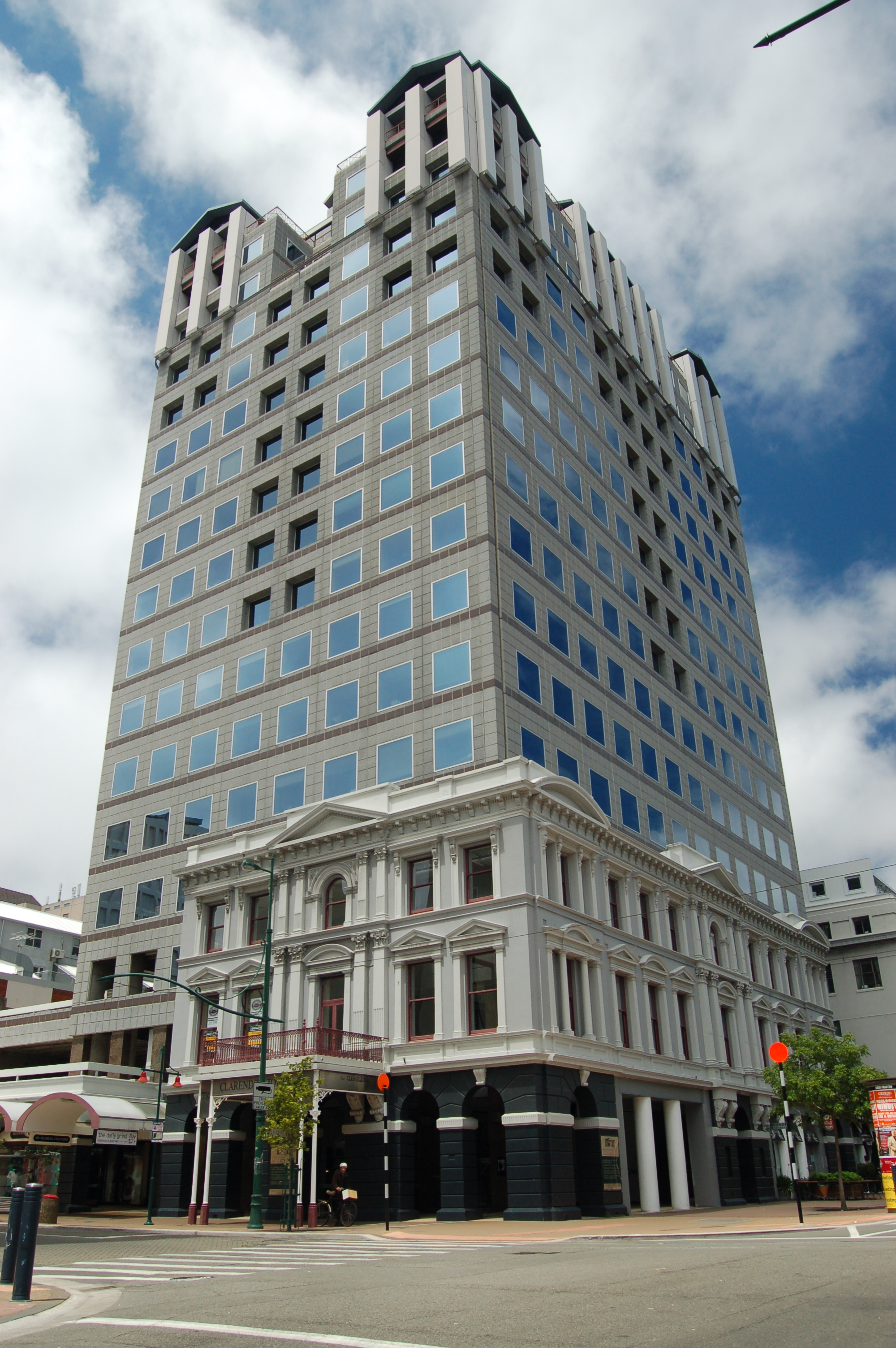
- Clarendon Tower with the retained façade of Clarendon Hotel, in 2005
- Interactive map of the Clarendon Tower area
- Former names: Clarendon Hotel

General information
- Type: office high rise
- Location: Worcester Street at Oxford Terrace, Christchurch Central City, New Zealand, 78 Worcester Street, Christchurch, New Zealand
- Completed: 1987
- Demolished: 2013

Technical details
- Floor count: 17 storeys

Design and construction
- Architect: Warren and Mahoney

Heritage New Zealand – Category 2
- Official name: Clarendon Hotel Facade
- Designated: 24-Jun-2005
- Reference no.: 1858

Clarendon Tower was a high rise building on Worcester Street at Oxford Terrace in the Christchurch Central City, New Zealand. Built on the site of the former Clarendon Hotel, the façade of the historic building was kept in the redevelopment and was protected by the New Zealand Historic Places Trust as a Category II heritage structure. Following damage from the February 2011 Christchurch earthquake, the 17-storey building has been demolished.

== History ==
=== Clarendon Hotel ===
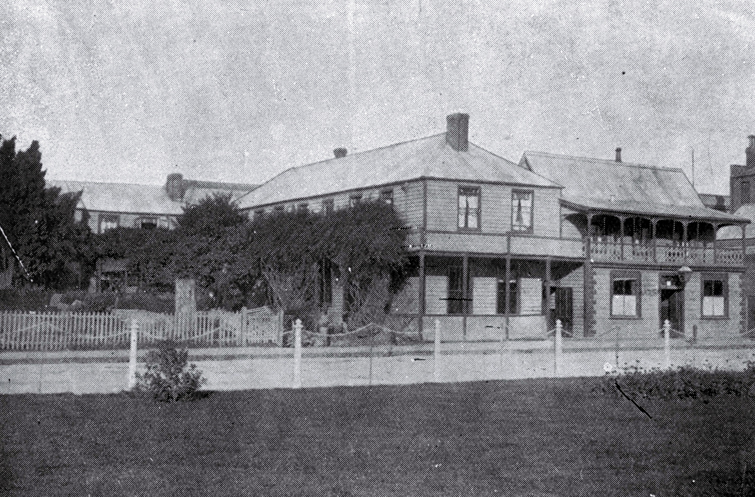
The original Clarendon Hotel in 1902 prior to its demolition

The first Clarendon, an early wooden hotel, was established in a former private house. It was located at 78 Worcester Street, on the corner of Oxford Terrace. The first occupier of the site was Guise Brittan in 1851, the land agent for the Canterbury Association. He operated the Christchurch land office, located diagonally opposite the intersection on the site that is these days occupied by Our City, a former home of the Christchurch City Council. Brittan sold his building in 1859 to Irish migrant Rowland Davis, who obtained a liquor licence and enlarged the house. Thus, the history of the site as a public house began.

A subsequent owner, George Oram, changed the name of the hotel to Clarendon in 1866, after the then British foreign secretary, the Earl of Clarendon. The quality of the hotel was recognised in 1869 when the Duke of Edinburgh stayed there and bestowed on Oram the title of 'Hotel Keeper by Appointment to His Royal Highness Prince Alfred the Duke of Edinburgh'.

The Clarendon Hotel was often used for inquests into drownings as it was located on the bank of the Avon River. It was also used as the departure point for Cobb and Co coaches to the West Coast.

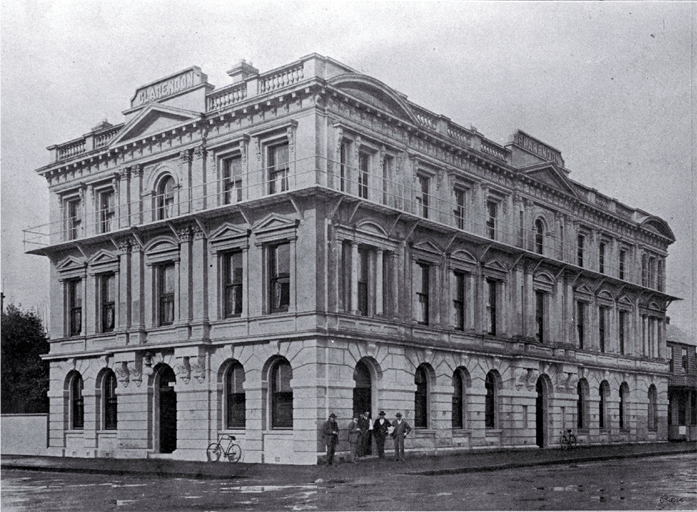
Clarendon Hotel soon after its construction in 1903

The much extended building was demolished and in 1902/03, a new hotel was erected for the Crown Brewery Company. Joseph Clarkson Maddison was the architect and he designed the three-storey building in Renaissance Revival style. Maddison was a notable architect in Christchurch at the time and designed 14 hotels over a period of 28 years (including Warner's and Carlton Hotels), the Old Government Building and the buildings for the New Zealand International Exhibition in 1906 in Hagley Park. The construction work was carried out by J. Otley.

Some notable people stayed in the hotel, including the Duke of Edinburgh (1869), Lee Kuan Yew (the 1st Prime Minister of Singapore), King George VI (1948), Queen Elizabeth II (1954) and the Queen Mother (1958). The biggest crowd was drawn when The Beatles stayed here during their 1964 tour.

Demolition of the hotel was first proposed in 1981, causing considerable controversy in Christchurch. Eventually, the Christchurch City Council suggested that the façade be retained with the redevelopment as an office high rise building. The hotel was demolished in 1986, with 2/3 of the Oxford Terrace and all of the Worcester Street façade being kept.

=== Clarendon Towers ===
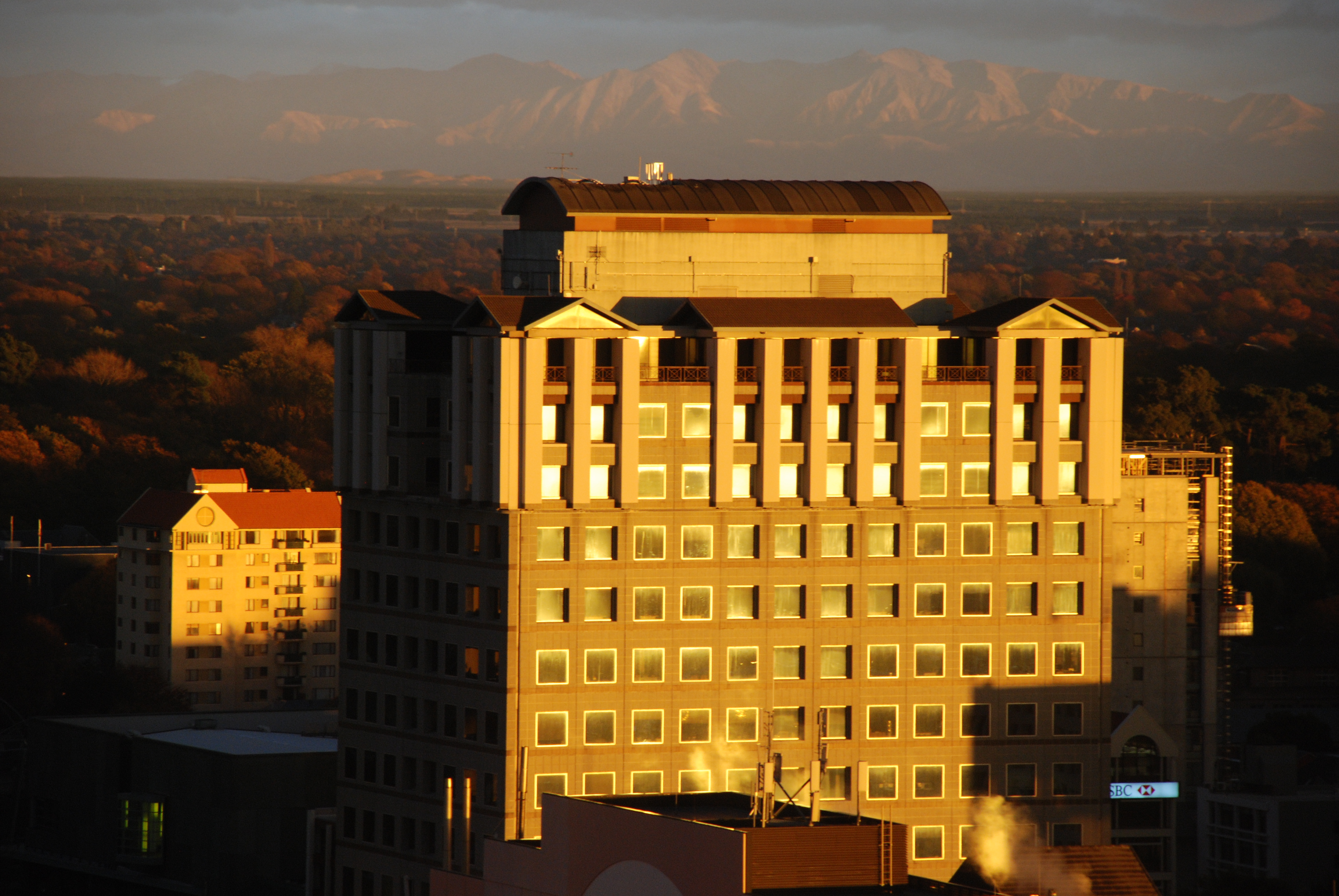
Clarendon Tower at daybreak (2007)

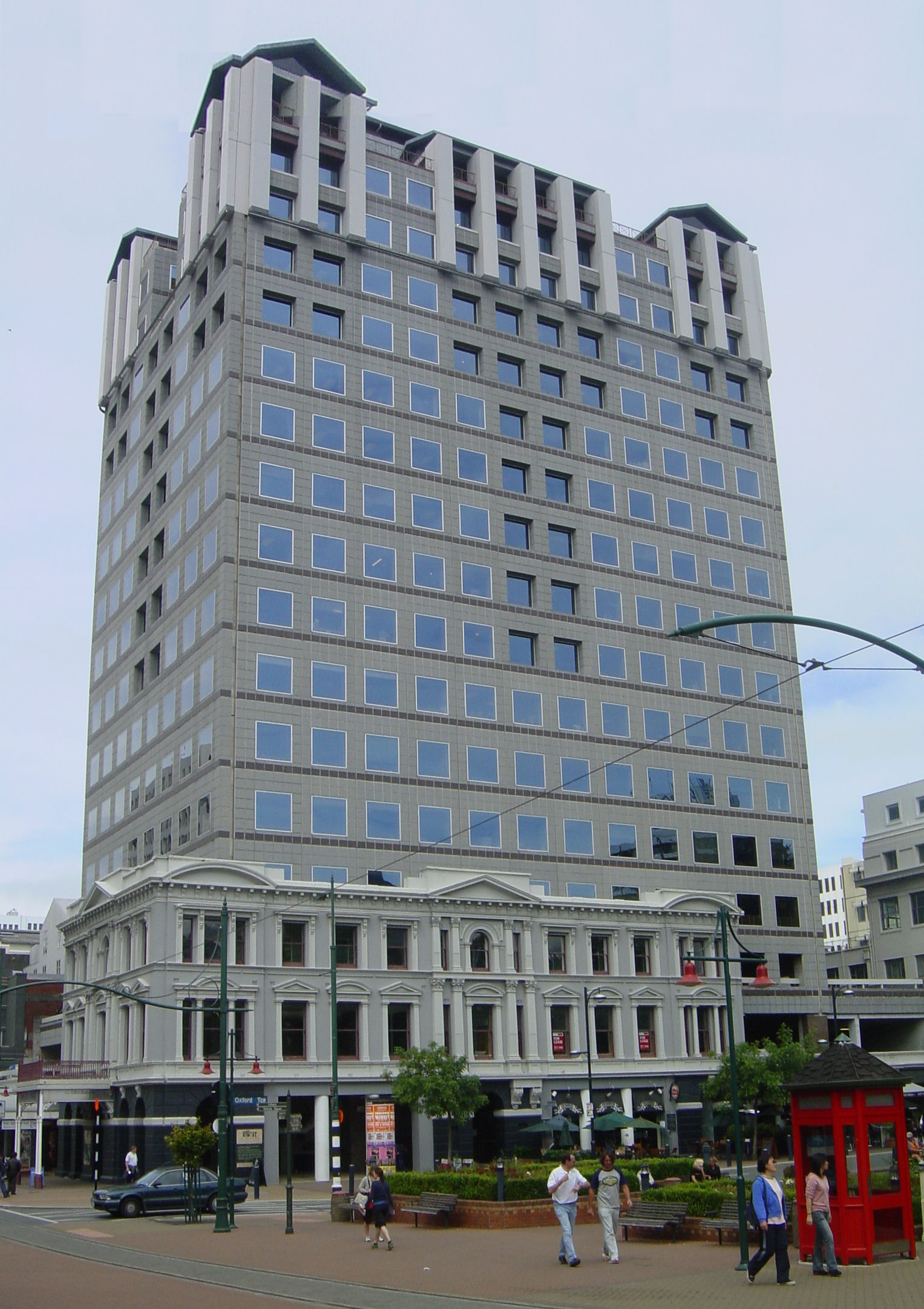
Clarendon Tower western side

The 17-storey 67.7 m tall Clarendon Towers, designed by Warren and Mahoney, was constructed in 1986/87. It was the first example of facadism in Christchurch. Local artist Bill Sutton described the new creation as "a boy with his trousers around his ankles", a comment which many agreed with, whilst others were grateful for the retention of the historic façade.

== Heritage listing ==
On 24 June 2005, the historic façade was registered by the New Zealand Historic Places Trust as a Category II historic place, with the registration number 1858. It marks the site where one of the pioneering Christchurch settlers, Brittan, had his first home. It was one of the early hotels, established in 1859 and it became one of the most notable hotels in Christchurch, accommodating notable guests. It is an example of one of the many important buildings designed by Maddison and is part of the heritage fabric of the area, with other notable buildings like the Public Trust Office Building and the second civic offices in Oxford Terrace, and the Avon Theatre and the Regent Theatre in Worcester Street. The Scott Statue is on the riverbank in front of the Clarendon Tower.

== Earthquake damage in 2011 ==
The high rise was badly damaged by the February 2011 Christchurch earthquake. Internal staircases collapsed over several floors, with people in the building trapped for hours. The floors disconnected from the concrete frames, with the floors at risk of collapse. The Canterbury Earthquake Recovery Authority ordered the demolition of the high rise. Two demolition options were put forward by the building owners, including an option using explosives. The demolition method agreed on was 'cut and crane', where the building was cut into pieces that were removed by crane. Demolition finished in February 2013.

In 2019 a competition was made for a design to replace the Clarendon Tower and reinstate the historic façade. The winner was architecture firm FourFourSixSix but so far no progress has started on the site.
