= Joseph Maddison =

New Zealand architect (1850–1923)

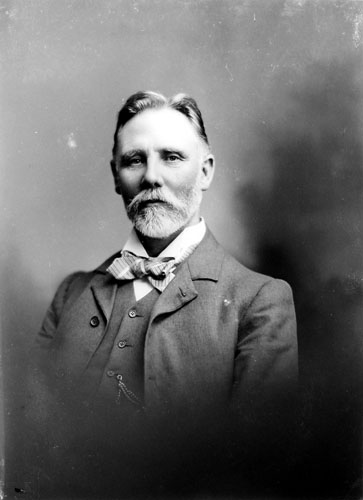
- Joseph Clarkson Maddison in 1905
- Born: 26 February 1850; Greenwich, Kent, England
- Died: 11 December 1923 (aged 73); Napier, New Zealand
- Occupation: Architect
- Buildings: Carlton Hotel; Clarendon Hotel; Merchiston Station homestead Mona Vale homestead Old Government Building, Christchurch; Warner's Hotel
- Projects: 1906 International Exhibition

Joseph Clarkson Maddison (26 February 1850 – 11 December 1923) was a New Zealand architect. He trained as an architect in his native London and came to Canterbury at the age of 22. At the end of the 19th and beginning of the 20th century, he was one of the most prominent architects in Christchurch, receiving commissions from all over the country. Until the February 2011 Christchurch earthquake, 13 of his buildings were listed by Heritage New Zealand on their register, with three of those Category I listings, but many of the Christchurch buildings have been demolished since. His style was plain and utilitarian, and he specialised in the classical Italian mode.

== Early life ==
Maddison was born in Greenwich, Kent, England in 1850. His parents were the beer merchant John Maddison and Matilda Clarkson. He attended private schools.

== Career ==
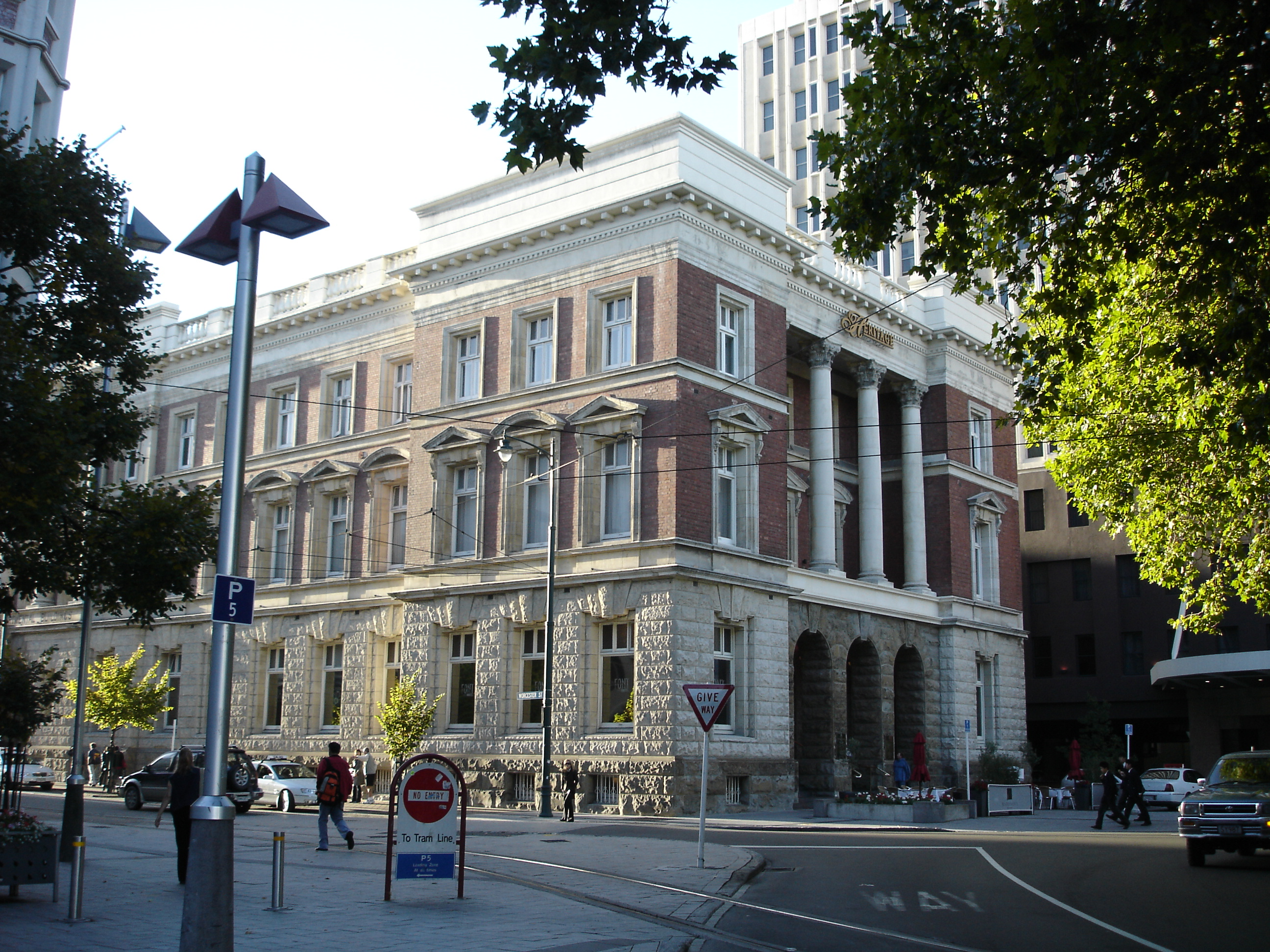
Old Government Building in Christchurch

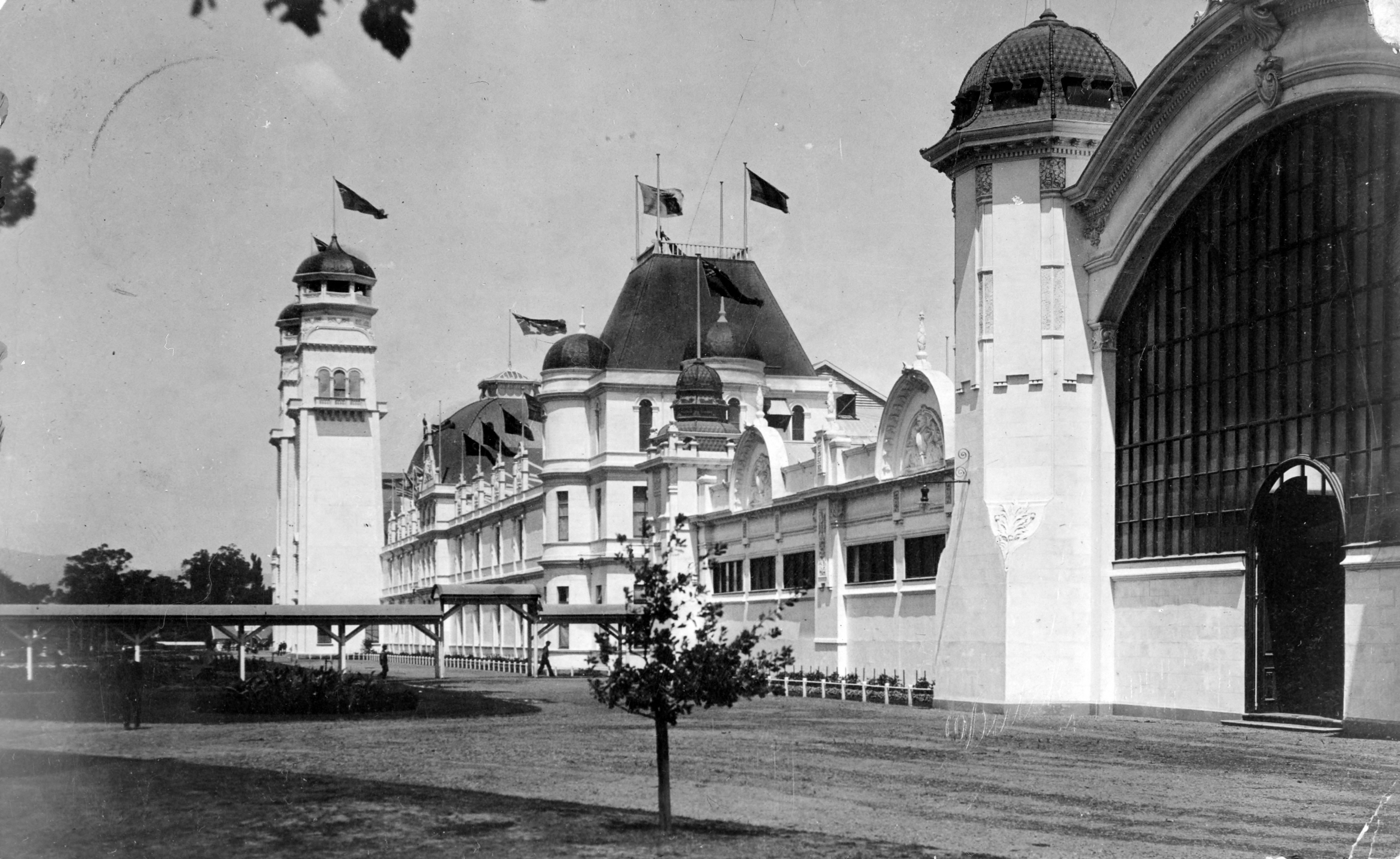
International Exhibition in Christchurch, main building

From age 17, Maddison studied in England under architect George Morris and at the National Art Training School. He apparently emigrated to Christchurch, New Zealand in 1872 on the Charlotte Gladstone (the source calls the ship the Gladstone, but only a Charlotte Gladstone came to Lyttelton) but his name does not appear on the shipping list. He initially had an office in Cashel Street, but from 1878 to 1916 worked from an office in Hereford Street approximately opposite Liverpool Lane.

He won two major competitions with his designs, including taking both first and second place in a competition to design Christchurch Town Hall in 1879. This success led to commissions from a variety of clients throughout the 1880s. During the 1890s, he worked primarily on the design of freezing works and abattoirs. In 1887, he was made a Fellow of the Royal Institute of British Architects.

In the early twentieth century, having established a national reputation for his work, Maddison designed the Christchurch Government Building, the Clarendon Hotel and the temporary exhibition buildings for the 1906 International Exhibition. The exhibition building was constructed in Christchurch's Hagley Park and had massive dimensions: the frontage measured 399 m, it was 113 m deep and the two towers were 49 m tall. The building, erected at a cost of £54,000, was removed again after the International Exhibition finished. The Government Building in Cathedral Square, which exemplify Maddison's restrained and pragmatic style, is modelled on Italian palazzo architecture.

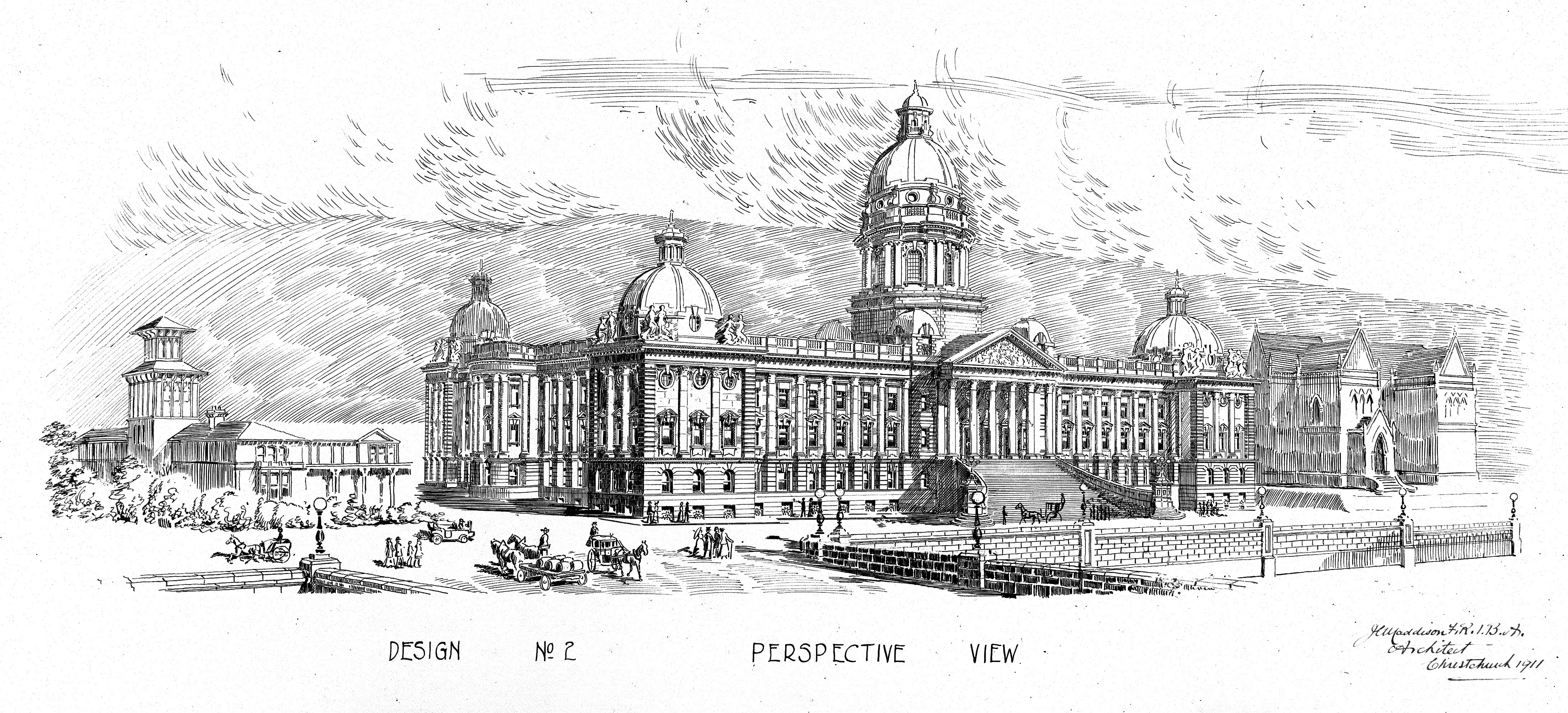
Maddison's unsuccessful competition entry for the New Zealand Parliament Buildings

Maddison entered the competition for the new Parliament Buildings in Wellington, after the original building burned down in 1907. The competition received 33 entries, and Maddison's entry did not get amongst the first nine. Government architect John Campbell's entries won first and fourth prize, and the building that was constructed combines elements of those two designs.

Due to his preference for functionality over ornament, Maddison designed only two churches in his career, St Paul's Church at Port Levy and Holy Innocents' Church at Amberley, in 1888 and 1890 respectively.

=== NZHPT and Christchurch earthquake ===
A remarkable number of Maddison's designs are (or were) recognised by Heritage New Zealand (NZHPT) as notable heritage buildings. Many of the Christchurch buildings were damaged in the 2010 Canterbury earthquake and after further deterioration in the 2011 Christchurch earthquake, at least half of them were demolished.

The following buildings in the Christchurch area are or were listed by the NZHPT:

Photo	Category	Name	Status	Address	Description
	II	Carlton Hotel	demolished in 2011	1 Papanui Road, Merivale	Hotel built for the 1906 International Exhibition
	II	Clarendon Hotel	demolition is under-way	78 Worcester Street, Christchurch Central City	Hotel façade retained for 1987 office high rise
	I	Mona Vale	damaged by earthquake; future unknown	63 Fendalton Road, Riccarton	Restaurant, café and function centre in the centre of a public park
	II	Linwood Public Library (former)	mostly collapsed in the February 2011 earthquake	388 Worcester Street, Linwood	Former public library used as a community centre
	I	Old Government Building	apparently ok, but located within the red zone	28 Cathedral Square, Christchurch Central City	These days a luxury hotel and apartments
	II	St Luke's Chapel (Christchurch City Mission)	?	275 Hereford Street, Christchurch Central City	Chapel relocated to the grounds of the Christchurch City Mission
	Historic Area	St Mary the Virgin vicarage	?	Church Square, Addington	1877 vicarage
	II	Warner's Hotel	demolished in 2011	50 Cathedral Square, Christchurch Central City	Hotel built in 1901
	II	Wood Bros Flour Mill	most buildings demolished in 2011	14-24 Wise Street, Addington	Former flower and grain mill, with the main building designed successively by Maddison in the 1890s
	II	Zetland Hotel	demolished in 2011	88-92 Cashel Street, Christchurch Central City	Hotel built in 1903

The following buildings outside of Christchurch are listed by the NZHPT:

Photo	Category	Name	Address	Description
	II	Presbytery	58 Sealy Street, Allenton, Ashburton	Presbytery of the Holy Name Parish, built in 1907
	I	Merchiston Station homestead	Putorino Road, Rata (near Hunterville)	Homestead built in 1908
	II	St Paul's Church	Port Levy	Church built in 1887/88

== Style ==
Maddison was known for his plain and utilitarian style, which suited the industrial design field in which he preferred to work. He tended to specialise in the classical Italian mode, rarely expanding into other, more baroque areas of architecture. He made forays into domestic gothic architecture with the Nurses' Home at Christchurch Hospital and the Zetland Arms Hotel, but these buildings were not as well-received as his usual work.

== Personal life ==
Maddison married Jane Midmore, the daughter of a surveyor, in 1873. They had three daughters together. For the last few years of his life, Maddison lived with one of his daughters in Napier. His wife Jane died in 1920. He died on 11 December 1923 at Napier at age 73.
