= Merivale, Christchurch =

Suburb of Christchurch, New Zealand

Merivale
- Suburb
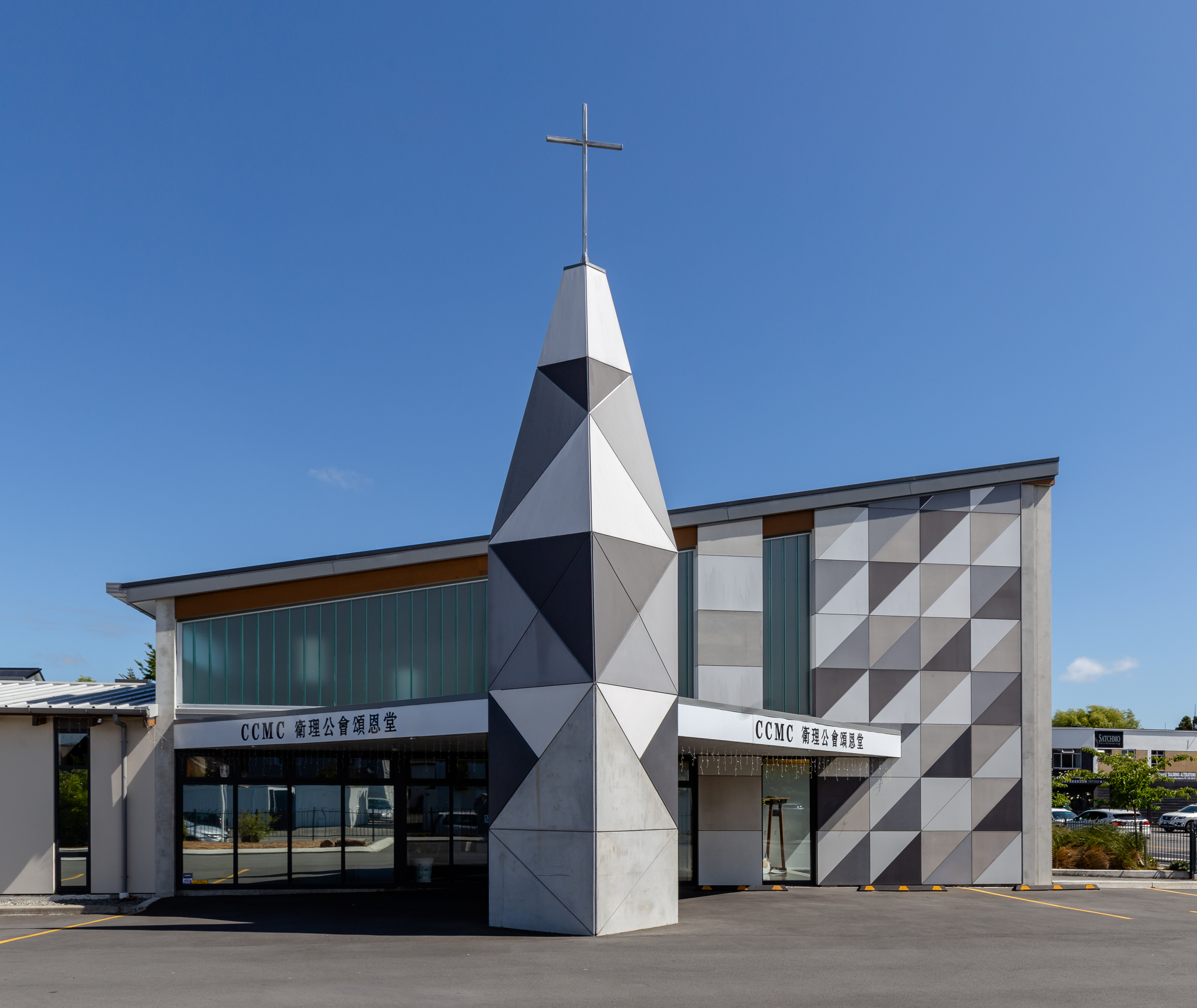
- Chinese Methodist Church
- Interactive map of Merivale
- Coordinates: 43.517031°S 172.616522°E
- Country: New Zealand
- City: Christchurch
- Local authority: Christchurch City Council
- Electoral ward: Fendalton
- Community board: Waimāero Fendalton-Waimairi-Harewood

Area
  - Land: 223 ha (550 acres)

Population (June 2025)
  - Total: 5,560
  - Density: 2,490/km^{2} (6,460/sq mi)

	Strowan
Fendalton	Merivale	St Albans
Riccarton	Hagley Park	Christchurch Central City

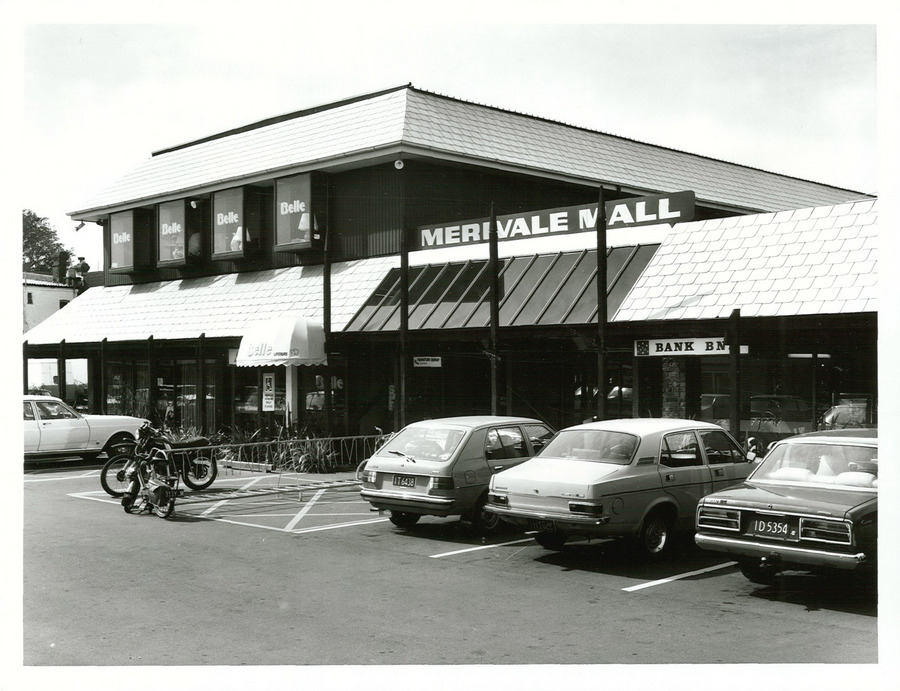
Merivale Shopping Centre (1983)

Merivale is a suburb of Christchurch, New Zealand, north of the city centre. Like all suburbs in Christchurch, it has no defined boundaries and is a general area, but for the purposes of statistical analysis only, Statistics New Zealand defines it as being Heaton Street to the north, Papanui Road to the east, Harper and Bealey Avenues to the south and Rossall Street to the west, although Real Estate advertising often will claim residences outside this area, especially St Albans to the east of Papanui Road, as being Merivale due to the perceived desirability of the area. The area directly west of Rossall Street, which is called Holmwood by Statistics New Zealand, is sometimes considered part of Merivale.

The area is predominantly residential.

== Early history ==
Charlotte Jackson of Rugby arrived in 1851 for her two rural sections which went from Merivale Lane to Aikmans Road and from Papanui Road to Boundary Road. She named the 100 acres (0.40 km^{2}) block Merevale. Her brother-in-law, the Rev. Thomas Jackson, was the vicar of Merevale, near Atherstone in Warwickshire. Charlotte Jackson later sold the sections. In December 1859 she sold the northern 50 acres (200,000 m^{2}) to Capt. T. H. Withers of Deptford, and in 1862 the southern 50 acres (200,000 m^{2}) to William Sefton Moorhouse. Moorhouse built a magnificent home on Merevale farm at 31 Naseby Street, which was demolished after the Christchurch earthquakes of 2010/2011. Subsequent owners of the property included John Studholme, John Thomas Peacock and Alfred Louisson.

A hotel has stood at the intersection of Papanui Road and Bealey Avenue since 1865. Carlton Hotel was built in its place in 1906 in time for the New Zealand International Exhibition. The hotel was demolished in April 2011 and has since been rebuilt to a contemporary design.

There are still a few of the narrow streets and lanes and many of the original cottages have been restored.

== Demographics ==
Merivale, comprising the statistical areas of Merivale and Holmwood, covers 2.23 km^{2} (0.86 sq mi). It had an estimated population of 5,560 as of June 2025, with a population density of 2,493 people per km^{2}.

Historical population
Year	Pop.	±% p.a.
2006	5,553	—
2013	5,019	−1.43%
2018	5,031	+0.05%
2023	5,349	+1.23%

Merivale had a population of 5,349 in the 2023 New Zealand census, an increase of 318 people (6.3%) since the 2018 census, and an increase of 330 people (6.6%) since the 2013 census. There were 2,409 males, 2,919 females, and 18 people of other genders in 2,277 dwellings. 3.5% of people identified as LGBTIQ+. The median age was 44.7 years (compared with 38.1 years nationally). There were 792 people (14.8%) aged under 15 years, 1,041 (19.5%) aged 15 to 29, 2,379 (44.5%) aged 30 to 64, and 1,137 (21.3%) aged 65 or older.

People could identify as more than one ethnicity. The results were 83.7% European (Pākehā); 4.9% Māori; 1.5% Pasifika; 13.5% Asian; 1.7% Middle Eastern, Latin American and African New Zealanders (MELAA); and 2.1% other, which includes people giving their ethnicity as "New Zealander". English was spoken by 96.9%, Māori by 1.1%, Samoan by 0.3%, and other languages by 16.5%. No language could be spoken by 1.3% (e.g. too young to talk). New Zealand Sign Language was known by 0.2%. The percentage of people born overseas was 27.1, compared with 28.8% nationally.

Religious affiliations were 36.1% Christian, 1.2% Hindu, 0.5% Islam, 0.8% Buddhist, 0.3% New Age, 0.3% Jewish, and 1.2% other religions. People who answered that they had no religion were 54.1%, and 5.4% of people did not answer the census question.

Of those at least 15 years old, 2,016 (44.2%) people had a bachelor's or higher degree, 1,944 (42.7%) had a post-high school certificate or diploma, and 588 (12.9%) people exclusively held high school qualifications. The median income was $53,500, compared with $41,500 nationally. 1,131 people (24.8%) earned over $100,000 compared to 12.1% nationally. The employment status of those at least 15 was 2,172 (47.7%) full-time, 726 (15.9%) part-time, and 96 (2.1%) unemployed.

Individual statistical areas
Name	Area (km^{2})	Population	Density (per km^{2})	Dwellings	Median age	Median income
Merivale	1.11	3,135	2,824	1,425	42.4 years	$50,900
Holmwood	1.13	2,211	1,957	852	48.7 years	$58,200
New Zealand					38.1 years	$41,500

== Economy ==
=== Merivale Mall ===
Merivale Mall, the local shopping centre, covers 7,580 m^{2}. It has 55 retailers including FreshChoice.

== Education ==
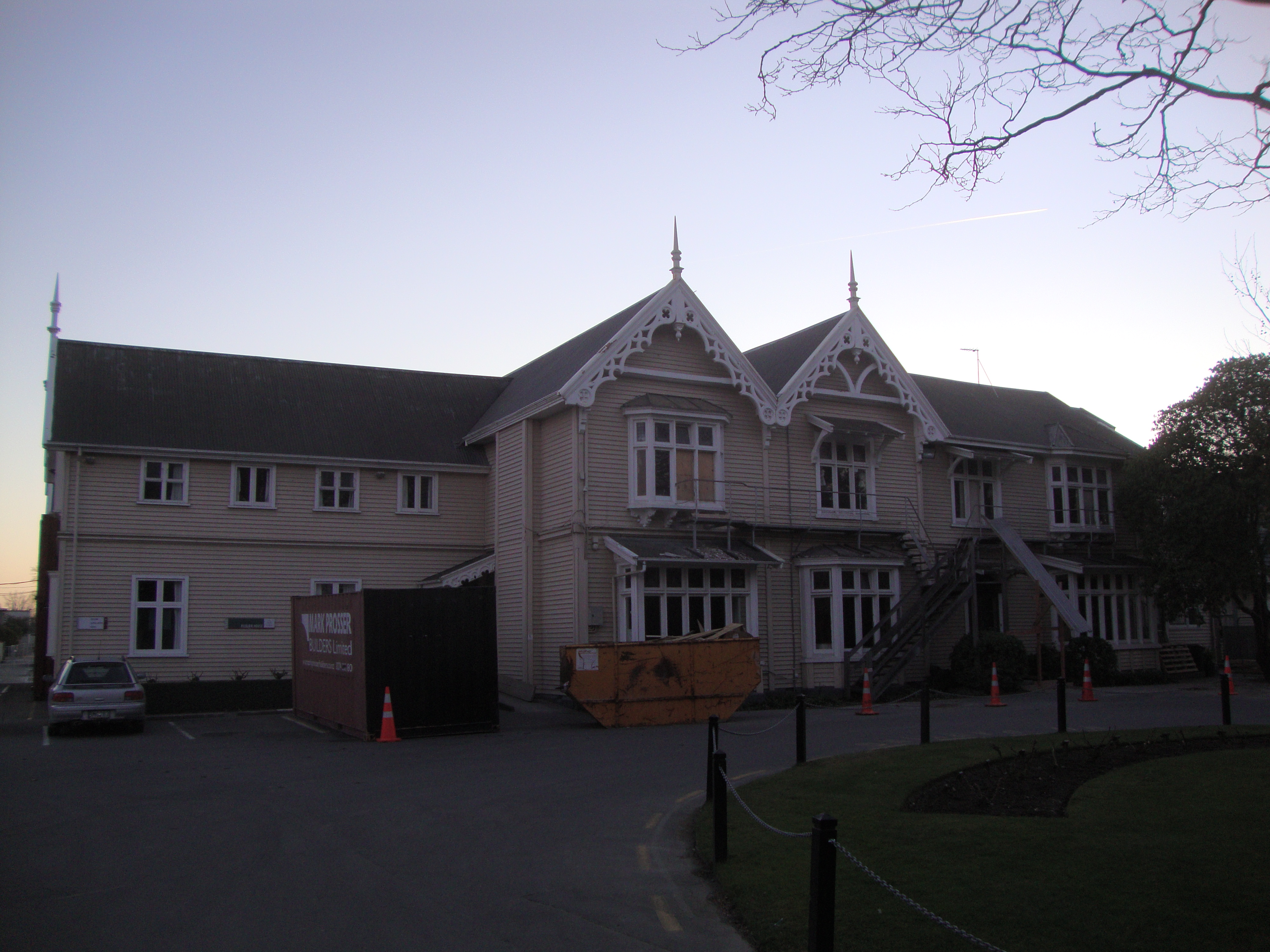
Kilburn House at St Margaret's College

Elmwood Normal School is a coeducational contributing primary school catering for years 1 to 6. It has a roll of 541. The school opened in 1882.

St Margaret's College is a private Anglican girls' school for years 1 to 13. It has a roll of 867. The school opened in 1910.

Rangi Ruru Girls' School is a private Presbyterian girls' school for years 7 to 13. It has a roll of 705. The school opened in 1889.

Selwyn House School is a private full primary girls' school for years 1 to 8. It has a roll of 294. It opened in 1929, with the forerunner Miss Sanders' School founded in 1875.

Ferndale School is a special school with a roll of 141.

Rolls are as of July 2026.
