= OGB (disambiguation) =

OGB may refer to:

- Österreichischer Gewerkschaftsbund, a labour union of employees
- ogb, the ISO 639-3 code for Ogbia language
- Order of the Golden Bear, an honor society at the University of California, Berkeley
- Orangeburg Municipal Airport, the IATA code OGB
- Odisha Gramya Bank, a Regional Rural Bank
- Old Government Building, Christchurch, a heritage building in Christchurch, New Zealand
- Old Gold & Black, the student-run newspaper of Wake Forest University
