= George Maddison =

George Maddison may refer to:

- George Maddison (footballer, born 1902) (1902–1959), English footballer
- George Maddison (footballer, born 1930) (1930–1987), English footballer
- George Maddison (British politician) (died 1783), joint Parliamentary Under-Secretary of State for Foreign Affairs 1782–83
- George Maddison (priest) (1809–1895), Archdeacon of Ludlow from 1877 to 1892

== See also ==
- George Madison (1763–1816), Governor of Kentucky
- George T. Madison (c. 1830–1868), Confederate colonel
