= Carlton Hotel, Christchurch =

Carlton Hotel
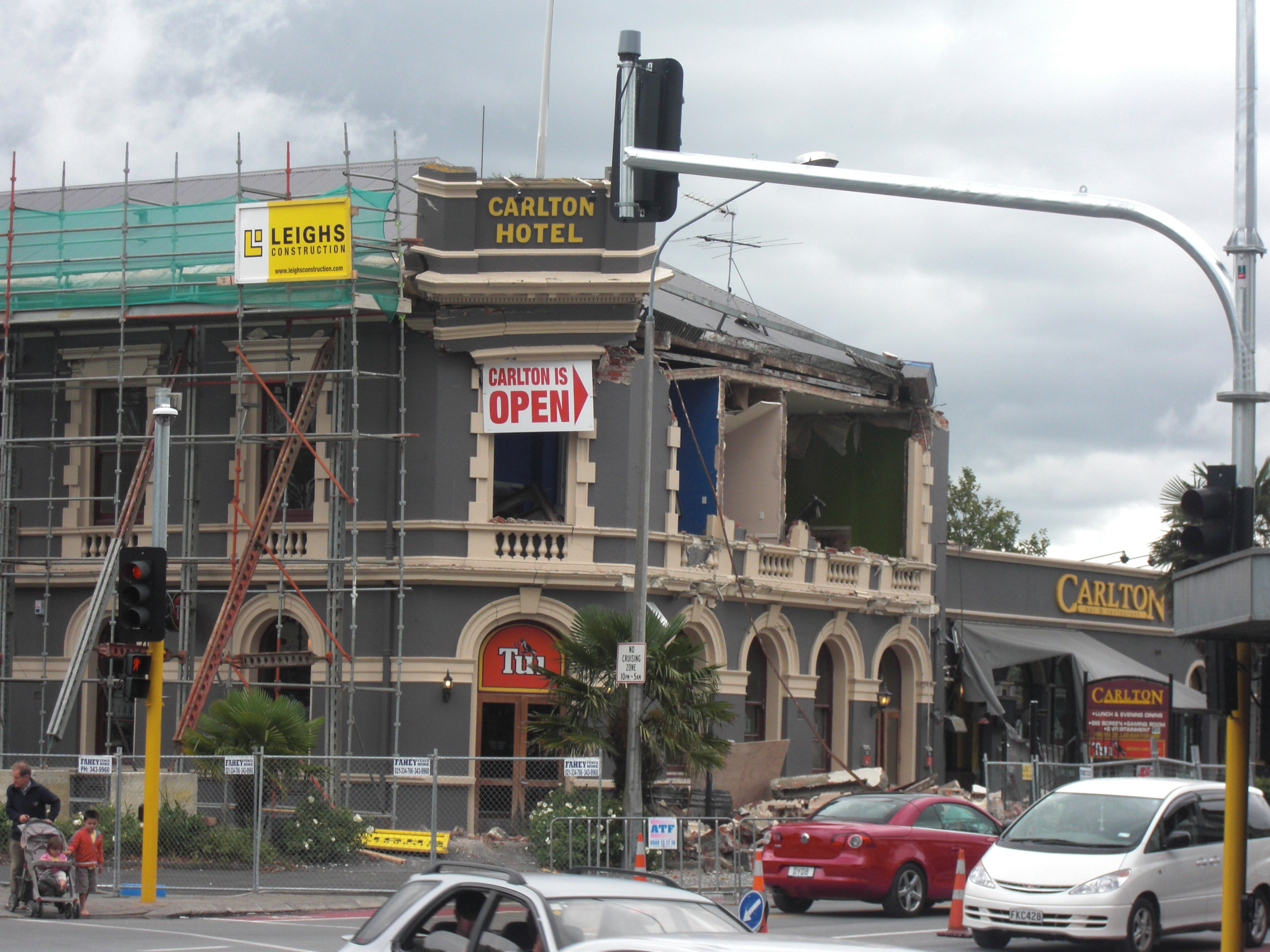
- Carlton Hotel in scaffolding for repairs of 2010 Canterbury earthquake damage, but with significant new damage visible from the February 2011 Christchurch earthquake

General information
- Type: Hotel
- Location: Merivale, 1 Papanui Road, Christchurch, New Zealand
- Coordinates: 43.52060°S 172.62749°E

Technical details
- Floor count: three

Design and construction
- Architect: Joseph Maddison

Heritage New Zealand – Category 2
- Designated: 26 November 1981
- Reference no.: 1841

References
- "Carlton Hotel". New Zealand Heritage List/Rārangi Kōrero. Heritage New Zealand.

The Carlton Hotel in Christchurch was a historic pub on the corner of Papanui Road and Bealey Avenue. Built in 1906 for the New Zealand International Exhibition, it was registered by the New Zealand Historic Places Trust as a Category II heritage building. The building was damaged in the February 2011 Christchurch earthquake and demolished on 9 April 2011.

== History ==
Papanui Road, linking to Main North Road, was the traditional route for travellers from the north. Cobb & Co travelled north via Victoria Street and Papanui Road, and one of the first tram routes in Christchurch was built along this corridor.

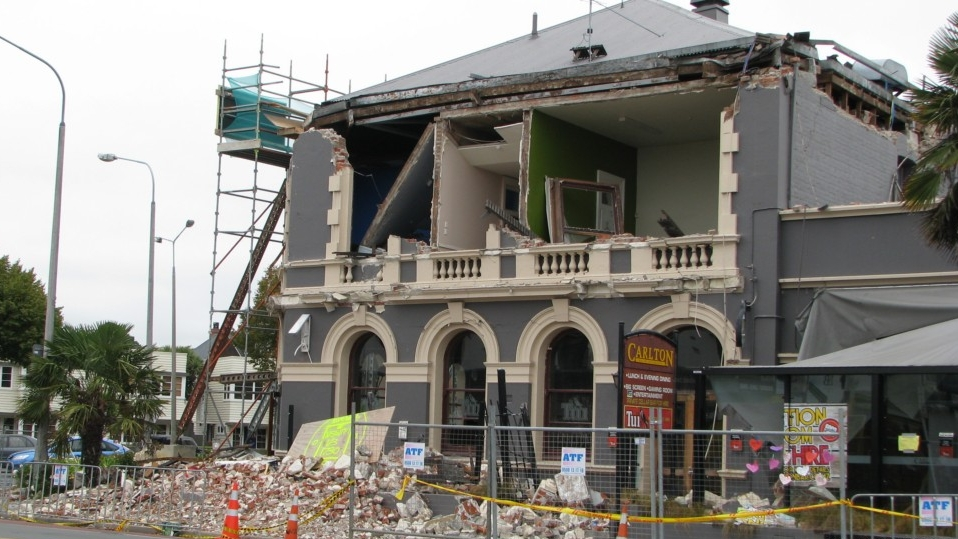
Carlton Hotel with February 2011 Christchurch earthquake damage

The first hotel was built on the site in 1865, only 15 years after the organised settlement of Christchurch began by the Canterbury Association. Ward's Brewery commissioned architect Joseph Maddison to design a new hotel, to be opened in time for the International Exhibition that was held in Christchurch's Hagley Park from November 1906 to April 1907. Maddison also designed the buildings for the International Exhibition, which attracted nearly two million visitors at a time when New Zealand's population was only one million.

The Carlton Hotel was the first place in New Zealand to serve beer on tap in 1939–1940, and it had the country's first beer garden in 1947. It opened New Zealand's first drive through bottle store in 1954. Burger King opened a fast food restaurant in September 1999 and took up much of the ground floor of the building.

Carlton Hotel suffered damage in the 2010 Canterbury earthquake, but remained open. It was heavily damaged in the subsequent earthquake on 22 February 2011, when part of the façade facing Papanui Road collapsed. Engineers found that the building was prone to failure in another strong aftershock, and it was demolished on 9 April 2011. The building's owner has replaced the building with a modern structure, but the new complex has been criticised as "unsympathetic".

== Heritage listing ==
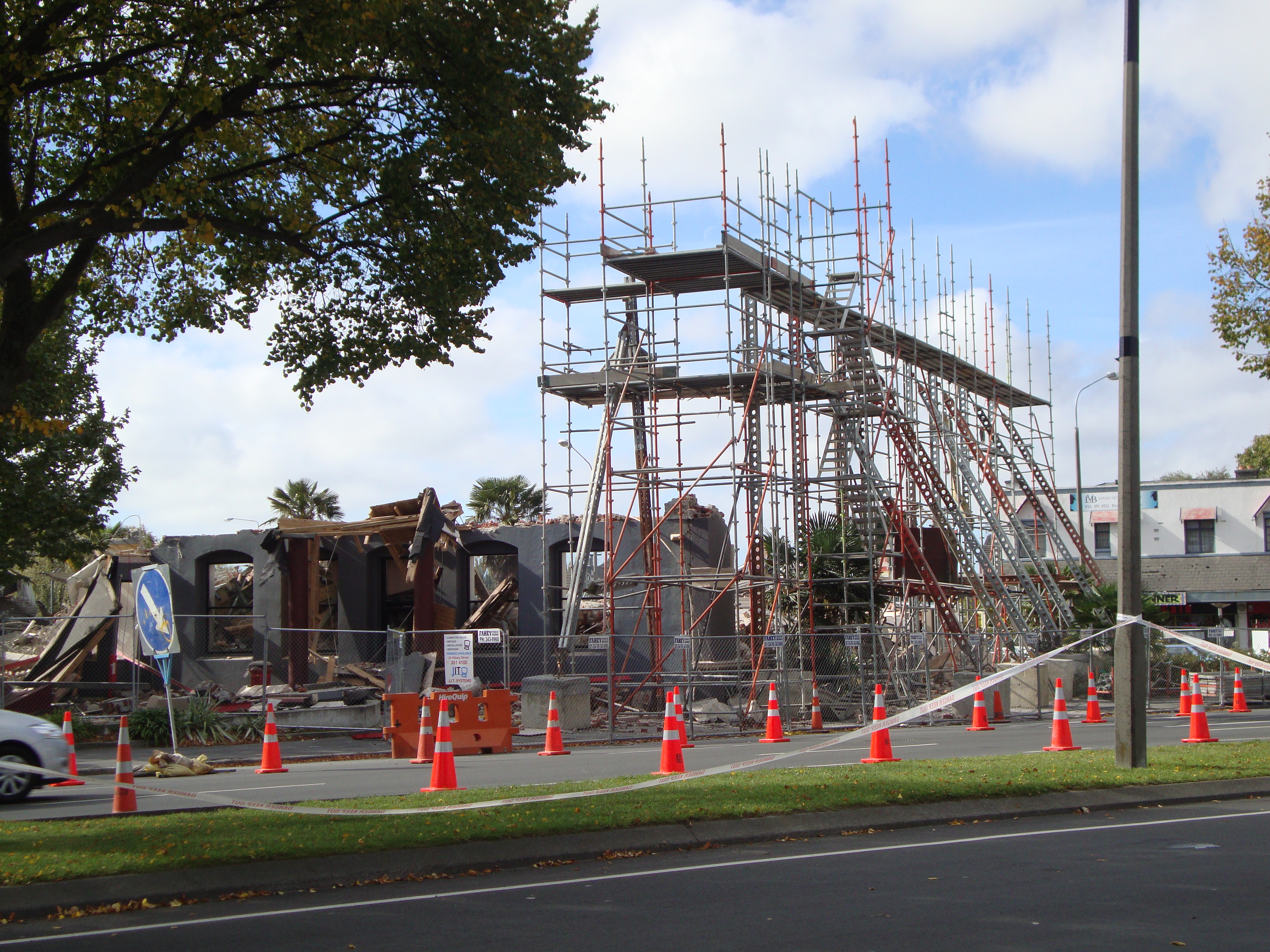
Carlton Hotel post demolition

On 26 November 1981, the building was registered by the New Zealand Historic Places Trust as a Category II historic place, with the registration number 1841. The building was recognised as an example of Maddison's work, who designed many hotels. It was located on a busy junction and regarded as a landmark. Due to several New Zealand firsts, it was an important part of the country's brewing industry.

The building was removed from the register during 2011.
