= Philip Robert Presants =

New Zealand painter

Presants, Philip Robert, 1867–1942. Chromolithograph on cover of Weekly Press, 1902. Alexander Turnbull Library

Philip Robert Presants (18 December 1867 – 27 October 1942) was a chromolithographer, designer and painter in New Zealand. He became Chief Artist of The Press in Christchurch, New Zealand. He was heavily involved in the New Zealand International Exhibition, as a member of the Decorative Committee and the Fine Arts Committee. He also designed the programme booklet and exhibited his own work. He died in 1942 in London.

== Early years in Norwich ==
Philip Robert Presants was born on 18 December 1867 in Norwich, England to Philip Thomas Presants and Emma née Gibbs. In 1890 Philip R. Preasants [sic], an apprentice architectural draughtsman, gained a Government Scholarship and a Third Prize for a 'Head from the Antique in Sepia'. He worked at Page Brothers (commercial lithographers) in Norwich, where a colleague (Alfred Munnings, later Sir Alfred) recollected: "He was an enthusiast and he helped me on". Like Alfred Munnings, Presants had studied at the Norwich School of Art and Design (now Norwich University of the Arts), and one of his studies is available online. Presants was living at Ethel Terrace, Hall Road, Lakenham at the time of his marriage in 1892 and had business premises in 7 Bury St, Norwich, as indicated on some extant letterhead, referring to himself as a 'chromolithographic artist & designer to the trade.' The family emigrated to New Zealand on the 'SS Rimutaka', operated by the New Zealand Shipping Company, in 1897.

== Christchurch years ==
Presants worked for The Press in Christchurch, New Zealand from about 1898 to 1909 as a chromolithographer and became Chief Artist by 1899. Four promotional photos from this period, held at Alexander Turnbull Library, show Presants at work with the large fine-grained stone blocks he imported from Germany. He printed a calendar for the New Zealand Shipping Company in 1899 and a copy is held at the Museum of New Zealand Te Papa Tongarewa.

Presants, Philip Robert, 1867–1942: New Zealand Shipping Co. Ltd. Calendar 1899. Ref: Eph-F-SHIP-1899. Alexander Turnbull Library, Wellington, New Zealand. http://natlib.govt.nz/records/22830327

Presants was responsible for a series of full-page colour lithographs in the Christmas editions of the Weekly Press ca. 1899–1907. Many of these works depict Māori subjects surrounded by endemic flowers and foliage and are available for inspection at the Alexander Turnbull Library. Although he was best known for his skills in chromolithography he was a designer and painter, working in watercolours and oils. One of his own art works entitled 'Young New Zealand at play: cricket in a mining town' was used as a colour supplement to The Press in 1899.

Presants' contribution to the emerging consciousness of New Zealanders is discussed in a PhD thesis by Cathy Tuato'o Ross. Ross concludes her review of Presants' contribution with the following statement: "Presants’ contribution to the newspaper and to the visual culture of the time was a model of professional excellence, working with and adapting established design and thematic conventions in a New Zealand context."

Philip was involved with the Canterbury Jubilee Exhibition of 1900–1901 for which he designed the certificates, including an award presented to T.J. Edmonds, later known for the Edmonds Cookery Book. Oral tradition records that Presants was the designer of the cover of the iconic second edition of the cookery book, published in 1910. Presants had a larger role in the organisation of the International Exhibition (1906) in Christchurch. He served as a member of the Decorative Committee and the Fine Arts Committee. Presants prepared the watercolour illustrations for the exhibition booklet, available for inspection at the Alexander Turnbull Library. He also exhibited some of his own work as a graphic artist.

After retiring from The Press in 1909, Presants worked out of his own studio in High St, Christchurch, 1912–1919, before moving to Belmont, Lower Hutt. During this period, he applied for a patent for a "container, folding or collapsible".

== Belmont ==
Presants took up a role with CM Banks Ltd in Wellington as factory manager, artist and designer. He remained there until 1921, when he resigned and accepted a position with Turnbull, Hickson and Gooder. Presants had purchased a large block of land in Norfolk St, Belmont and his wife, Eliza, re-opened the grounds as the Belmont Picnic Grounds. His health then began to deteriorate and he went on a sketching tour of the South Island. Presants unsuccessfully advertised the picnic grounds for sale in 1924 "on account of the vendor going away" but they were still owned and operated by Eliza in 1928.

== Later life ==
Presants travelled almost every year between New Zealand and England from 1925 to 1935, as attested by port arrival and departure records in Australia, Canada, the USA and England, leaving his family behind in Belmont. He settled in the UK just before the second World War, with his health continuing to deteriorate until he became a patient at University College Hospital, London in 1941. Presants was found drowned in the Serpentine, 27 October 1942, "on the way to, and near, St Mary's Hospital"; the coroner recorded an open verdict.
