= Victoria Lake (New Zealand) =

Lake in Christchurch, New Zealand

Coordinates: 43°31′39″S 172°37′20″E

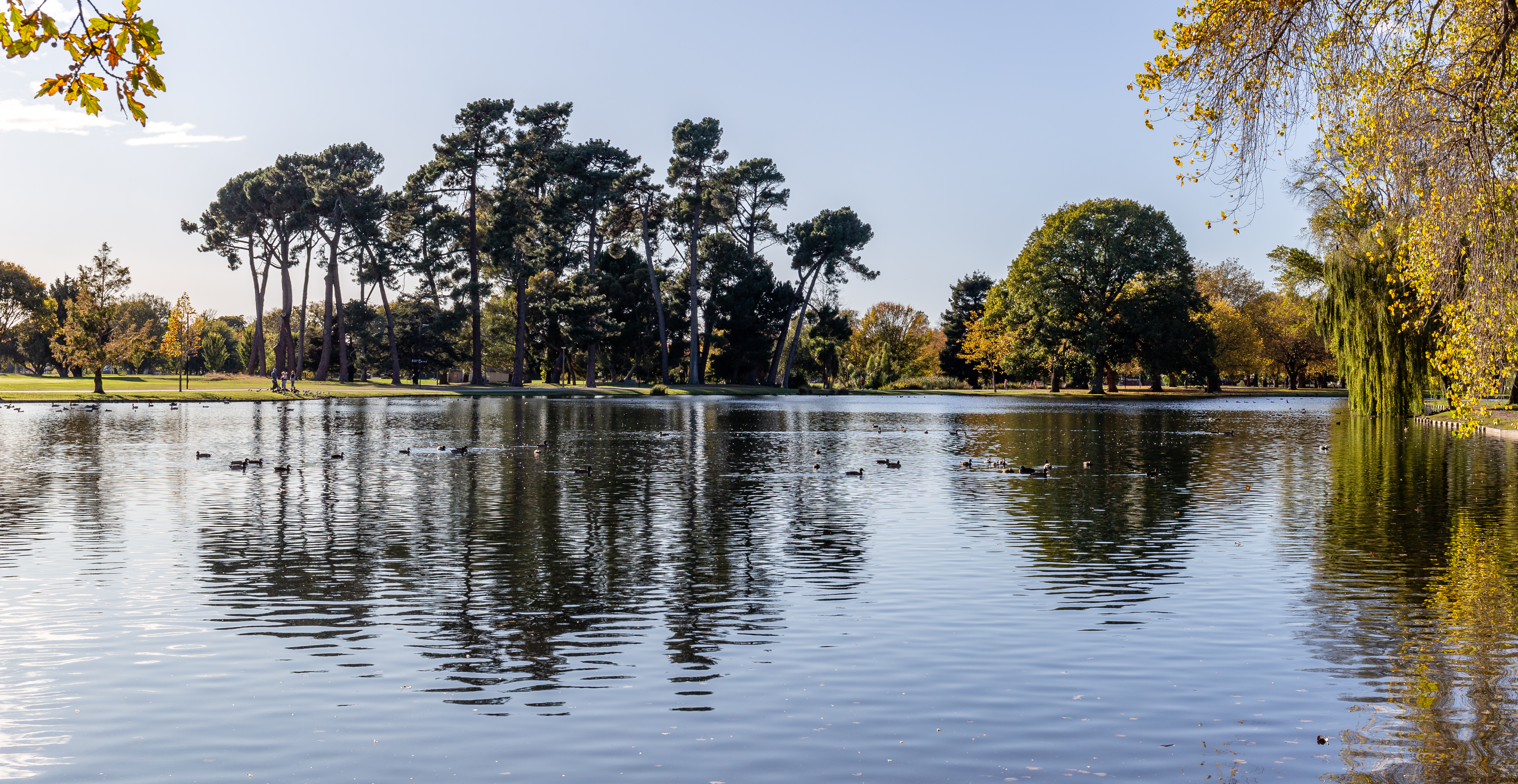
Lake Victoria in 2020

Victoria Lake is a small artificial lake in Hagley Park, Christchurch. Victoria Lake is a 19,294.63 square metres (207,685.7 sq ft) lake in the centre of Christchurch, New Zealand, immediately west of Albert Lake. Hagley Park was established by the Canterbury Provincial Council and began to take shape in the 1860s, but a small swamp in North Hagley Park remained. Victoria Lake was created in 1897 in celebration of Queen Victoria’s Golden Jubilee, by turning the swamp into a lake. A variety of native trees and sand were removed from the swamp to turn it into a lake. Historic photos of Victoria Lake are available on Te Papa's online archive here.

In February 2011, the Christchurch earthquakes damaged Victoria Lake and it had to be drained to remove debris. It reopened in May 2012. Now, it is used privately by the Christchurch Model Yachting Club, who build and test model yachts on the lake's water.
