= Ken Maddison =

Australia international rugby league footballer

Personal information
- Full name: Kenneth Alan Maddison
- Born: 13 March 1944 (age 82) Sydney, New South Wales, Australia

Playing information
- Position: Second-row
Club
Years	Team	Pld	T	G	FG	P
1965–71	St. George	101	24	0	0	72
1972–75	Cronulla-Sutherland	78	17	0	0	51
	Total	179	41	0	0	123
Representative
Years	Team	Pld	T	G	FG	P
1974	New South Wales	1	0	0	0	0
1973	Australia	4	3	0	0	9
- Relatives: Keith Maddison (brother)

Ken Maddison was an Australian rugby league footballer who played in the 1960s and 1970s. He played in the New South Wales Rugby Football League premiership for the St. George Dragons (with whom he won the 1966 premiership) and later the Cronulla-Sutherland Sharks (whom he captained). He was also a state and national representative, playing four Tests for Australia in 1973.

== Playing career ==
=== St. George ===
Maddison started his first-grade football career with St. George in 1965 and the following year appeared in his first grand final, the last of the Dragons' record-breaking 11 consecutive premiership wins. He won that first premiership as a centre but later moved into the forwards and enjoyed success in his career as a wide running second-rower.

In the late 1960s after St George had lost the stars of their long reign, Ken Maddison's work ethic (along with the stellar brilliance of Billy Smith and Graeme Langlands) was a factor in keeping the club competitive, regularly finishing in the top five. Maddison played in the 1971 Grand Final loss to South Sydney, again in the centres. Ken's younger brother Keith Maddison also played alongside him at the Dragons in six seasons from 1966 to 1971.

=== Cronulla-Sutherland ===
In 1972 Maddison moved to the young Cronulla-Sutherland club, playing in the second-row.

1973 was Maddison's career high-point when he became the first forward to win the Rothmans Medal for best and fairest player in the League, edging out Ron Coote by just one point. He also scored a personal best eight tries that year before playing in Cronulla's first Grand Final, the 1973 loss to Manly-Warringah 7 – 10.

Although Maddison played at a time when the loose forwards of the Souths' pack – Coote, Bob McCarthy, Gary Stevens and Paul Sait – dominated representative selections, he managed his Australian debut at the end of a great club season in 1973 when he was selected for the 1973 Kangaroo tour of Great Britain and France. He was one of the form forwards of the tour scoring two tries in the third and deciding Test against Great Britain. He played in all three Ashes Tests, in one Test against France and in nine minor tour matches scoring six tries in all. The following year he made his sole state appearance for New South Wales Blues.

Maddison continued playing for Cronulla-Sutherland until 1975. In 2006, he was named at second-row in a Sharks dream team.
