= John Maddison (architectural historian) =

John M. Maddison FSA (born 1952) is a Scottish architectural historian and artist. He was an architectural adviser to the Victorian Society and then a historic buildings representative to the National Trust in East Anglia. He is a fellow of the Society of Antiquaries of London. He is a former chair of the governors of Norwich School of Art and Design and a trustee of the Cambridgeshire Historic Churches Trust. He designed a new altarpiece in eight panels for Bishop Alcock's Chapel at Ely Cathedral.

== Selected publications ==
- Blickling Hall. National Trust, 1987. ISBN 0707800862
- Medieval archaeology and architecture at Lichfield. British Archaeological Association, 1993. (Editor) ISBN 0901286362
- Felbrigg Hall. National Trust, 1995. ISBN 0707802202
- Ely Cathedral design and meaning. Ely Cathedral Publications, Ely, 2000. ISBN 1873027036
