= Keith Maddison =

Australian rugby league footballer

Personal information
- Full name: Keith Maddison
- Born: Sydney, New South Wales, Australia

Playing information
- Position: Centre, Second-row
Club
Years	Team	Pld	T	G	FG	P
1966–72	St. George	68	8	0	0	24
- Relatives: Ken Maddison (brother)

Keith Maddison is an Australian rugby league footballer who played in the 1960s and 1970s.

Maddison came to the St. George Dragons from Newcastle Wests and was graded in 1966. Maddison was the brother of Ken Maddison, who was also at the club during this time. After seven seasons at St. George, Maddison retired from first grade at the conclusion of the 1972 NSWRFL season.
