= International Exhibition (1906) =

1906/07 world fair held in Christchurch, New Zealand

New Zealand International Exhibition
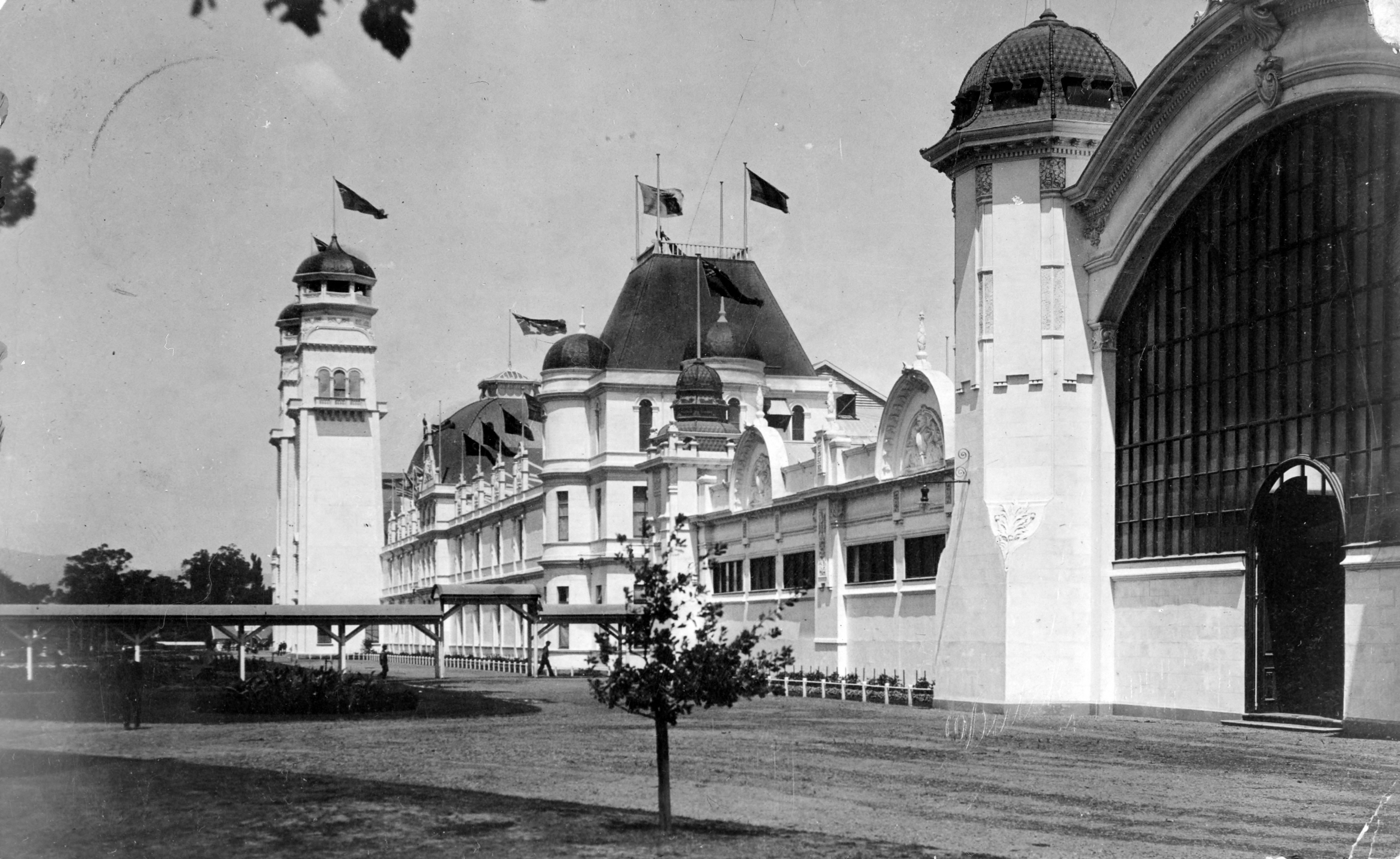
- Main building

Overview
- BIE-class: Unrecognized exposition
- Name: New Zealand International Exhibition
- Area: 164 hectares (410 acres)
- Visitors: 1,967,632

Location
- Country: New Zealand
- City: Christchurch
- Venue: Hagley Park
- Coordinates: 43°31′48″S 172°37′12″E

Timeline
- Opening: 1 November 1906
- Closure: 15 April 1907

Universal expositions
- Previous: Liège International Exposition (1905) in Liège
- Next: Brussels International Exposition (1910) in Brussels

Simultaneous
- Other: Milan International (1906)

The New Zealand International Exhibition (the biggest in the country to that time) opened on 1 November 1906 in Hagley Park, Christchurch, New Zealand. Nearly two million people visited the exhibition during the next few months.

The idea for the International Exhibition came from the prime minister, Richard Seddon, who was working on the government's 1903 budget and noticed a line item for the country to be represented at the St. Louis World's Fair in 1904. In Parliament, Seddon announced his idea as an intercolonial fair for New Zealand "on a scale unprecedented south of the Line". The initiative approved by cabinet contained just three facts: it was to be larger than any prior event, to be held in Christchurch's Hagley Park, and be held soon. The government financed the exhibition and would cover any losses. When public servants queried about the scale of the proposed event, Seddon clarified his expectations:

I thought I made it clear when I said it was to surpass anything hitherto held in the colony.

A 90 chains (1,800 m) branch railway line was built in late 1905 across North Hagley Park starting at the Riccarton station to service the exhibition (goods traffic only) and a temporary tram line was built in Peterborough Street, Park Terrace and Salisbury Street to connect with the Victoria Street tram. The attractions included New Zealand's first professional symphony orchestra (conducted by Alfred Hill), and the first Dominion pipe band contest, which was won by the Dunedin Highland Pipe Band.

Amusements included a water chute on Victoria Lake, a dragon train, a toboggan course, a helter-skelter and a gondola. The Pike featured penny in the slot machines, a maze, and Professor Renno and his Palace of Illusions. Visitors were also able to view a 360 degree panoramic painting of the Battle of Gettysburg, accompanied by a history of the battle, at the Cyclorama.

The exhibition closed on 15 April 1907 and the remaining buildings had been removed by the end of August 1907.

The architect for the buildings was Joseph Maddison. He also designed the Carlton Hotel, which was commissioned by the Wards's Brewery to be built in time for the International Exhibition.

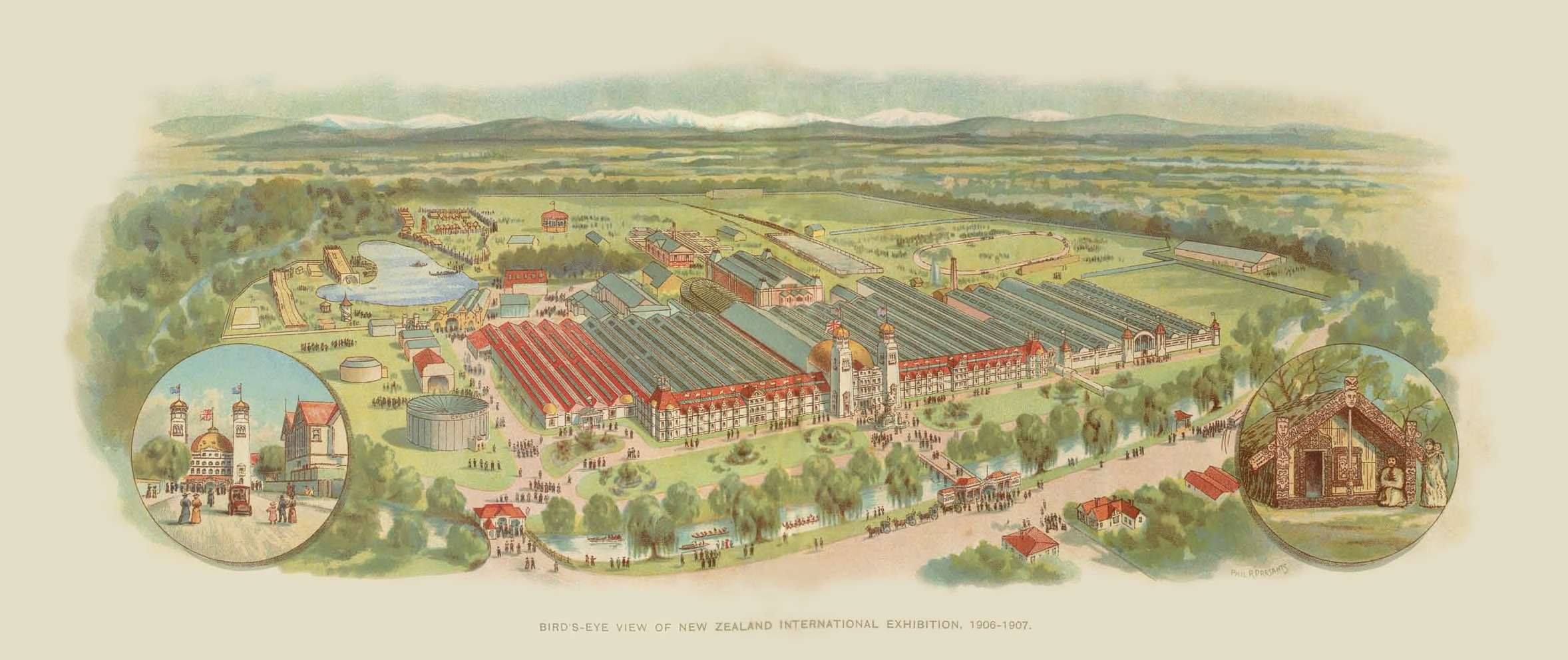
Chromolithograph of the Exhibition Buildings in Hagley Park by Philip Robert Presants

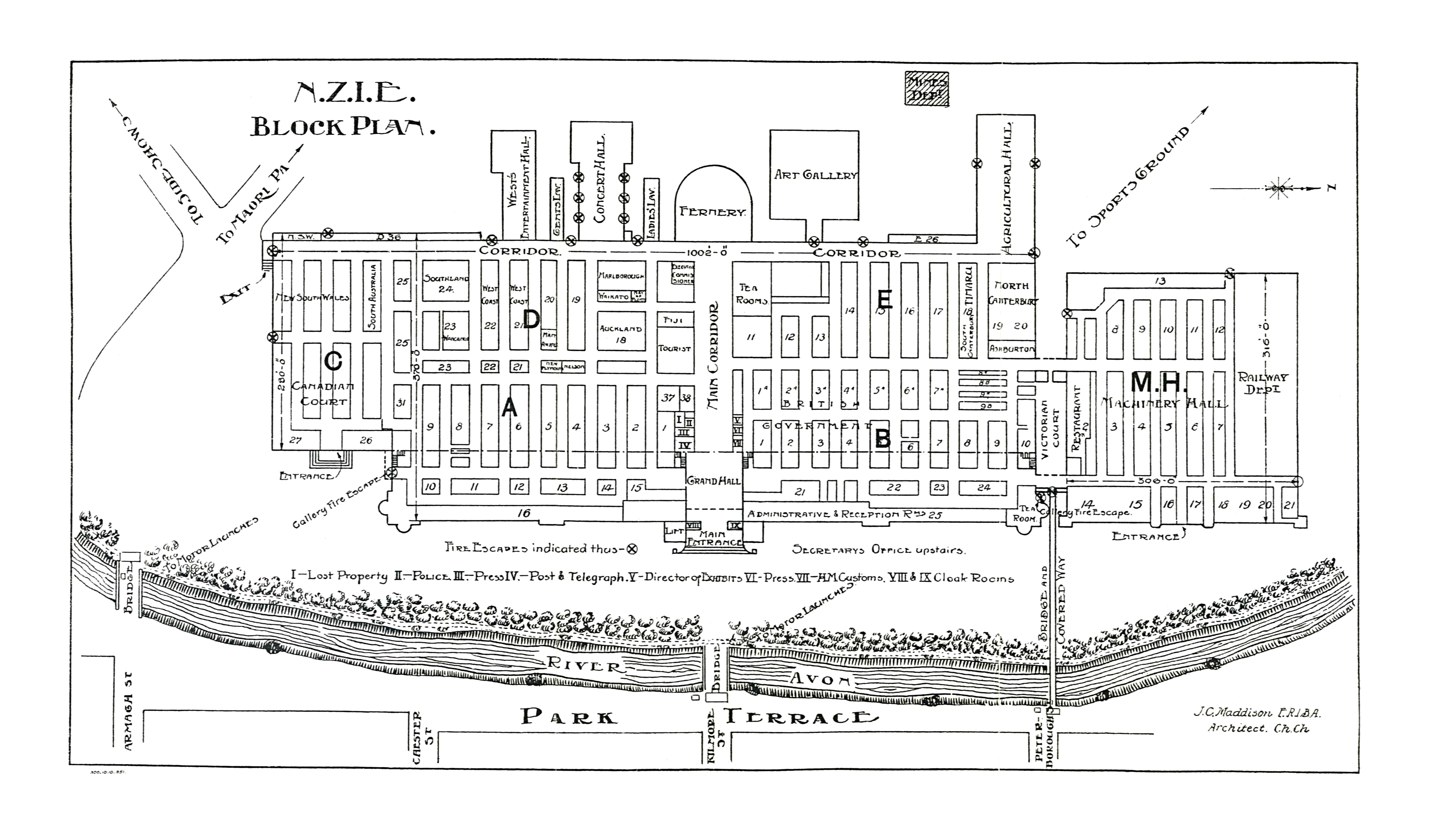
Plan of the Exhibition Buildings in Hagley Park
