= Old Government Building, Christchurch =

Historic building in Christchurch, New Zealand

Old Government Building
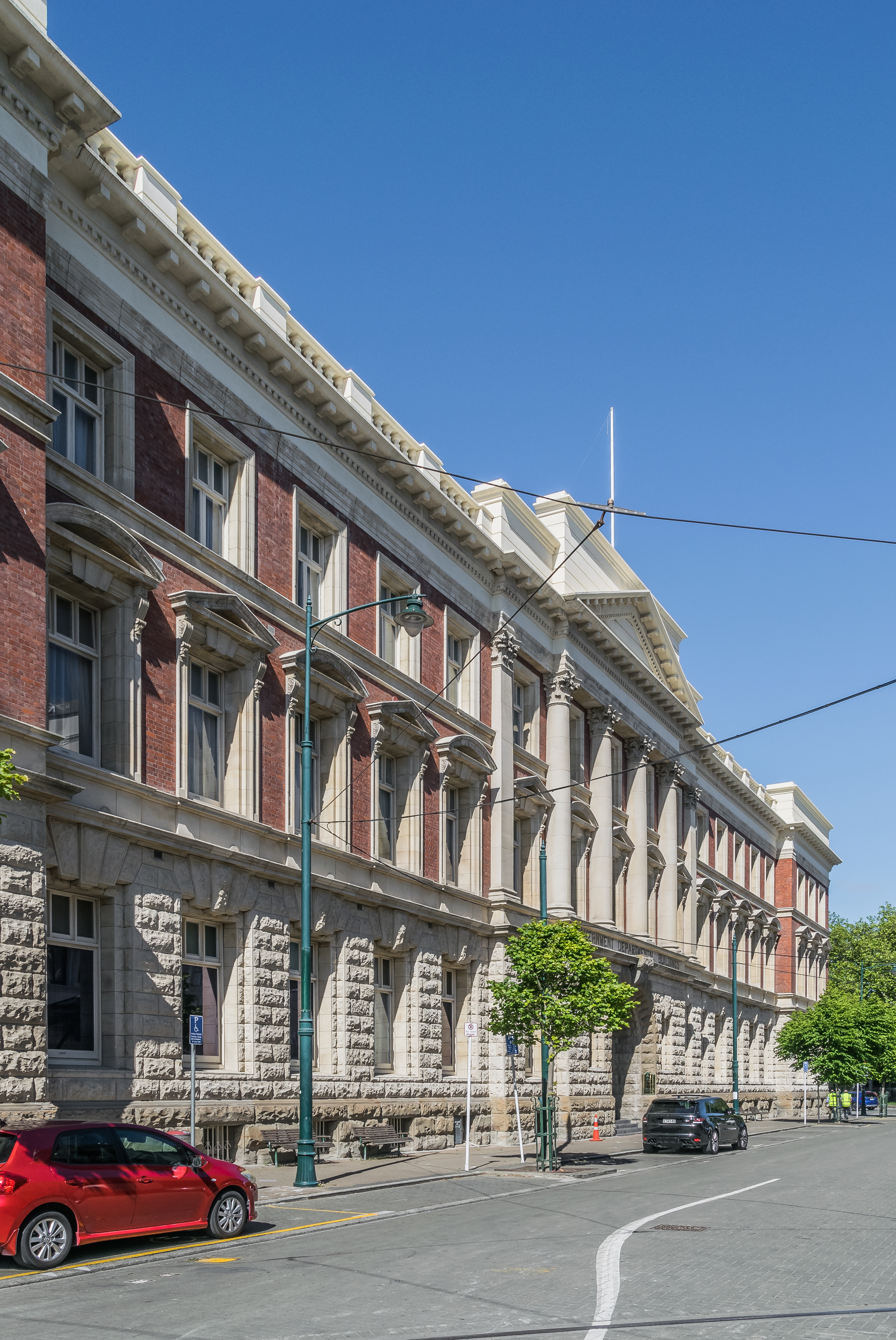
- The building in 2017
- Alternative names: Government Buildings; Government Building; Old Government Buildings

General information
- Architectural style: Italian High Renaissance palazzo
- Location: Christchurch Central City, 98 Worcester St, Christchurch, New Zealand
- Coordinates: 43°31′52″S 172°38′17″E
- Construction started: 1910
- Completed: 1913

Design and construction
- Architect: Joseph Maddison
- Awards: Canterbury Heritage Awards – Seismic category winner in 2012 and Built Heritage Award winner in 2010

Heritage New Zealand – Category 1
- Designated: 5 April 1984
- Reference no.: 301

The Old Government Building (also known as the Government Buildings and formerly the New Government Building; sometimes pluralised) is a heritage building complex in Christchurch, New Zealand. It was designed by Joseph Maddison in 1909 for use by government departments. It is a Category I heritage building listed with Heritage New Zealand.

== History ==
The building was designed to centralise various government departments in Christchurch that had previously been housed in the Canterbury Provincial Council Buildings and other rented spaces throughout the city. The building originally opened in 1913 and housed various Government departments up until the 1980s. The last Government department to occupy the building was the Ministry of Works and Development.

The complex has been known by different names throughout its history. It was colloquially referred to as the New Government Building when it was first developed and opened. Later, it became the Old Government Building, a name which it is now commonly known by. The building has also been referred to more generally as the Government Buildings in some academic, historical, and architectural documents.

After being vacant for some time the building was threatened to be demolished in 1991. On 11 July 1991 the Christchurch City Council purchased the building from the government for $735,000. The council then sold it to the ‘Symphony Group’ in 1995 and it was converted into a hotel with the conditions to strengthen and conserve the building. It is now home to the Heritage Hotel Christchurch and the bar O.G.B.
