= George Maddison (footballer, born 1930) =

English footballer

Personal information
- Date of birth: 6 October 1930
- Place of birth: Sculcoates, England
- Date of death: 1987 (aged 56–57)
- Position: Goalkeeper

Senior career*
Years	Team	Apps	(Gls)
1948–1952	Aldershot	2	(0)
1952–1953	York City	11	(0)
	Corby Town	?	(?)
- * Club domestic league appearances and goals

George Maddison (6 October 1930 in Sculcoates, England – 1987) was an English footballer.
