= Hagley Park, Christchurch =

Park in Christchurch, New Zealand

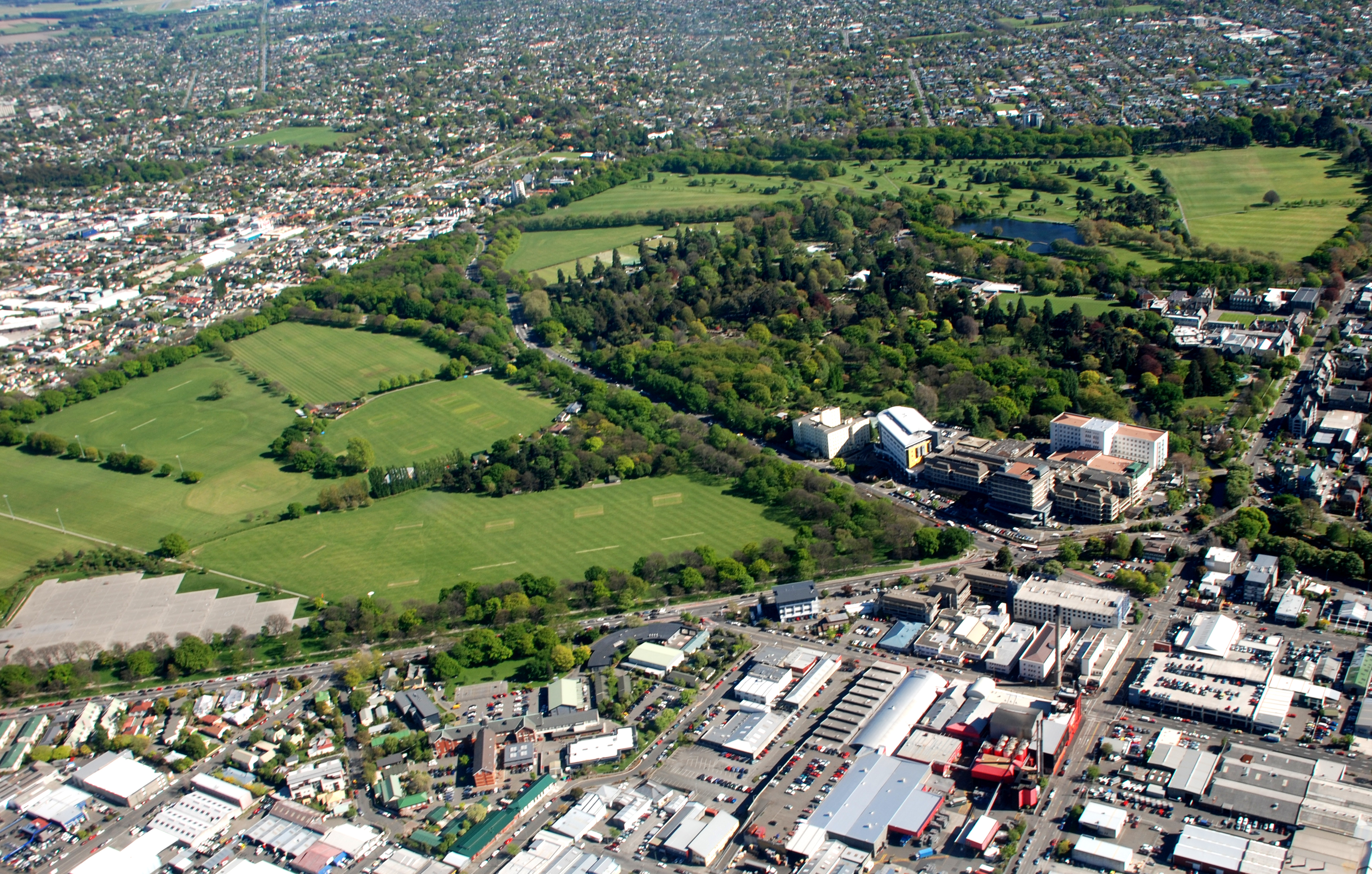
- Aerial view of Hagley Park, showing (from top) North Hagley Park, the Botanic Gardens, and South Hagley Park
- Interactive map of Hagley Park, Christchurch
- Type: Public park
- Location: Christchurch
- Coordinates: 43.53°S 172.62°E
- Area: 1.65 km^{2} (0.64 sq mi)
- Created: 1856
- Operator: Christchurch City Council
- Status: Open all year

Hagley Park is the largest urban open space (164.637 hectares) in Christchurch, New Zealand, and was established in 1855 by the Provincial Government. According to the government's decree at that time, Hagley Park is "reserved forever as a public park, and shall be open for the recreation and enjoyment of the public." Hagley Park is characterised by its trees and broad open spaces. Hagley Park was named after Hagley Park, the country estate of Lord Lyttelton, who became chairman of the Canterbury Association in March 1850.

== Location ==
The park lies to the west of the central city. The longest road boundary is that along Deans Avenue, often regarded as one of The Four Avenues which delimit central Christchurch. On the western side adjacent is the suburb of Riccarton.

To the north and northeast, the natural path of the Avon River bounds the park. Moorhouse Avenue and Hagley Avenue form the south and south-eastern boundaries, respectively. Along the eastern boundary, the Park is defined by the two kilometre loop of the Avon River, which extends into the side of Hagley Park.

The Christchurch Botanic Gardens (21.14 hectares) are located within this loop and frequent bridges provide connections. The Botanic Gardens contain a collection of beautiful flowers and trees from around the world. The gardens attract many birds to the park, and sightseers frequently visit the park to view the plants and the wildlife.

The Canterbury Museum and Christ's College are the two other land uses that take up the balance of the land within the river's loop.

Two major avenues subdivide the park into three units. The northern unit is Little Hagley Park (6.96 hectares), with North Hagley Park (87.17 hectares) lying to the south of Harper Avenue. South Hagley Park (70.507 hectares) lies to the south of North Hagley Park, separated by Riccarton Avenue.

== Road proposals ==
At various times, it was proposed to build additional roads through the park. In the 1860s, it was considered to connect Armagh Street with the Great South Road (now called Riccarton Road).

== Usage ==
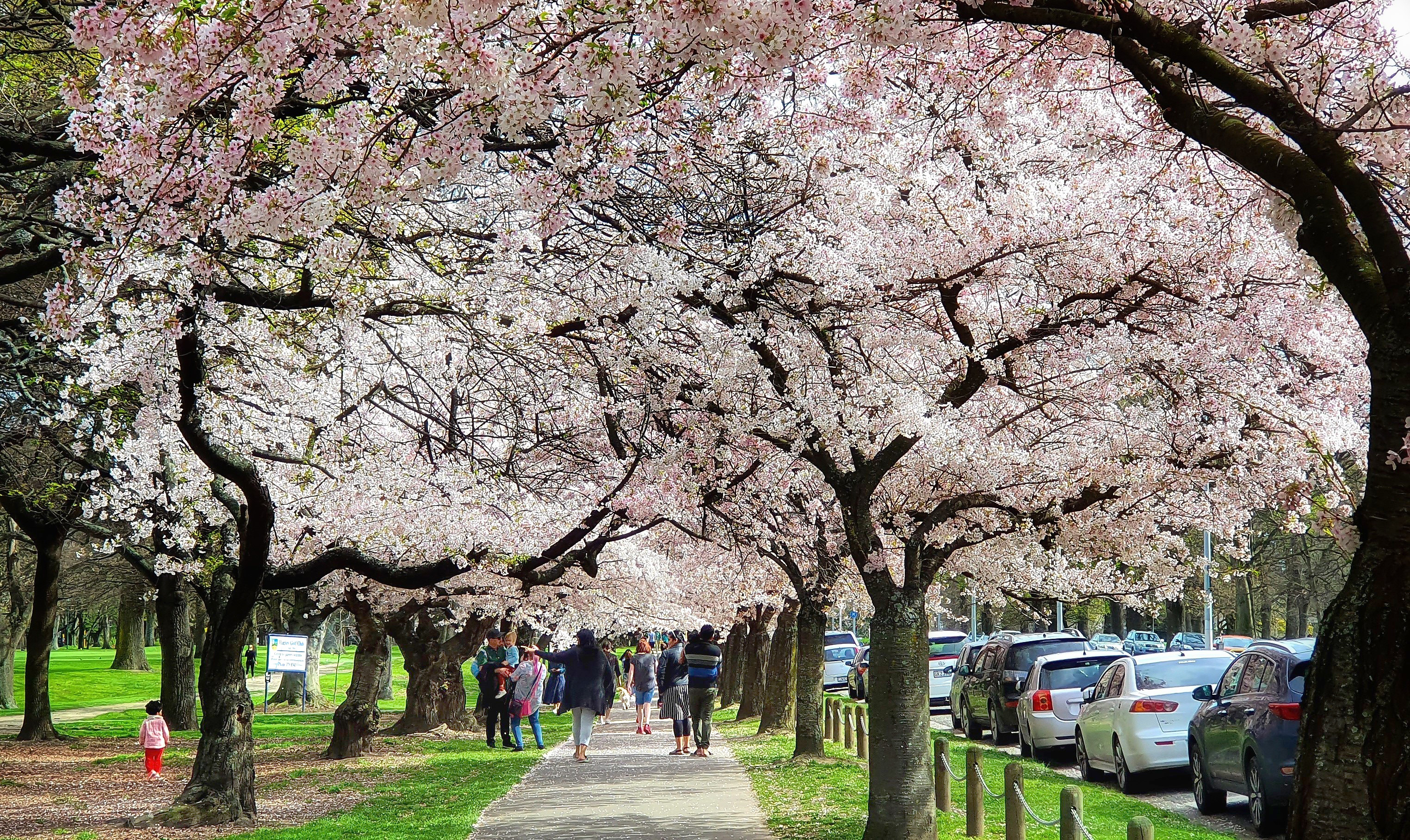
Cherry blossoms flowering during springtime in Hagley Park

In its early days, Hagley Park was used for horse races. Hagley Park has frequently been a site for gathering large crowds together: it served as the location for the Great Industrial Exposition of 1882; the New Zealand International Exhibition in 1906–1907; and a 2019 national memorial of 20,000 people for the victims of the Christchurch mosque shootings. The park has also hosted the Electric Avenue Music Festival.

In 1906, the Australasian tennis championships (now known as the Australian Open) were held in Hagley Park as part of the Grand Slam. The singles event was won by Tony Wilding, who defeated Francis Fisher in three sets.

There is a golf course in North Hagley Park. South Hagley Park contains several netball courts, the Hagley Oval cricket ground and a heliport for Christchurch Hospital, although as of 2019 there are calls to build a helipad on the roof of the hospital itself.

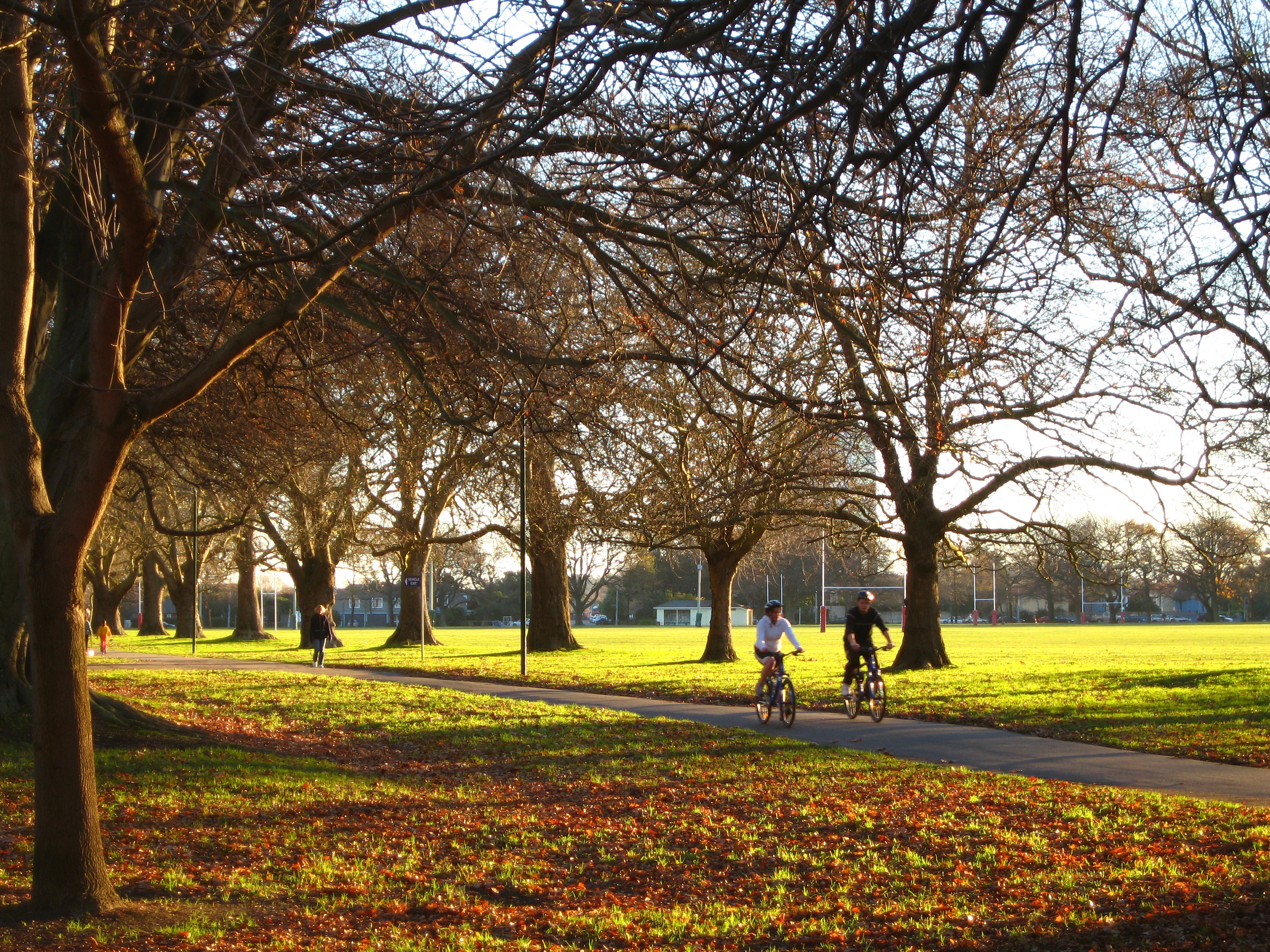
North Hagley Park, late afternoon in winter

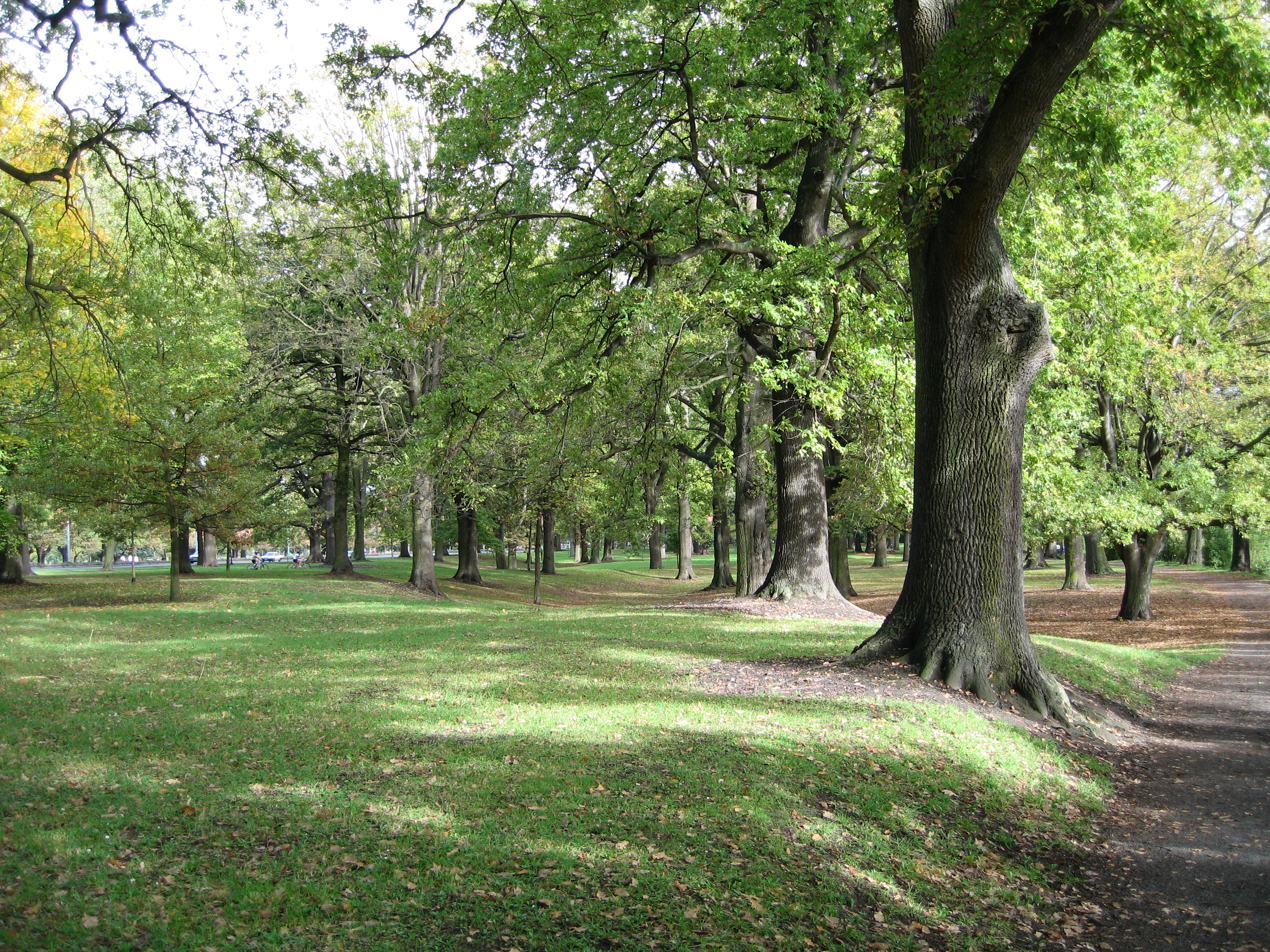
Little Hagley Park (north of Harper Ave) in summer

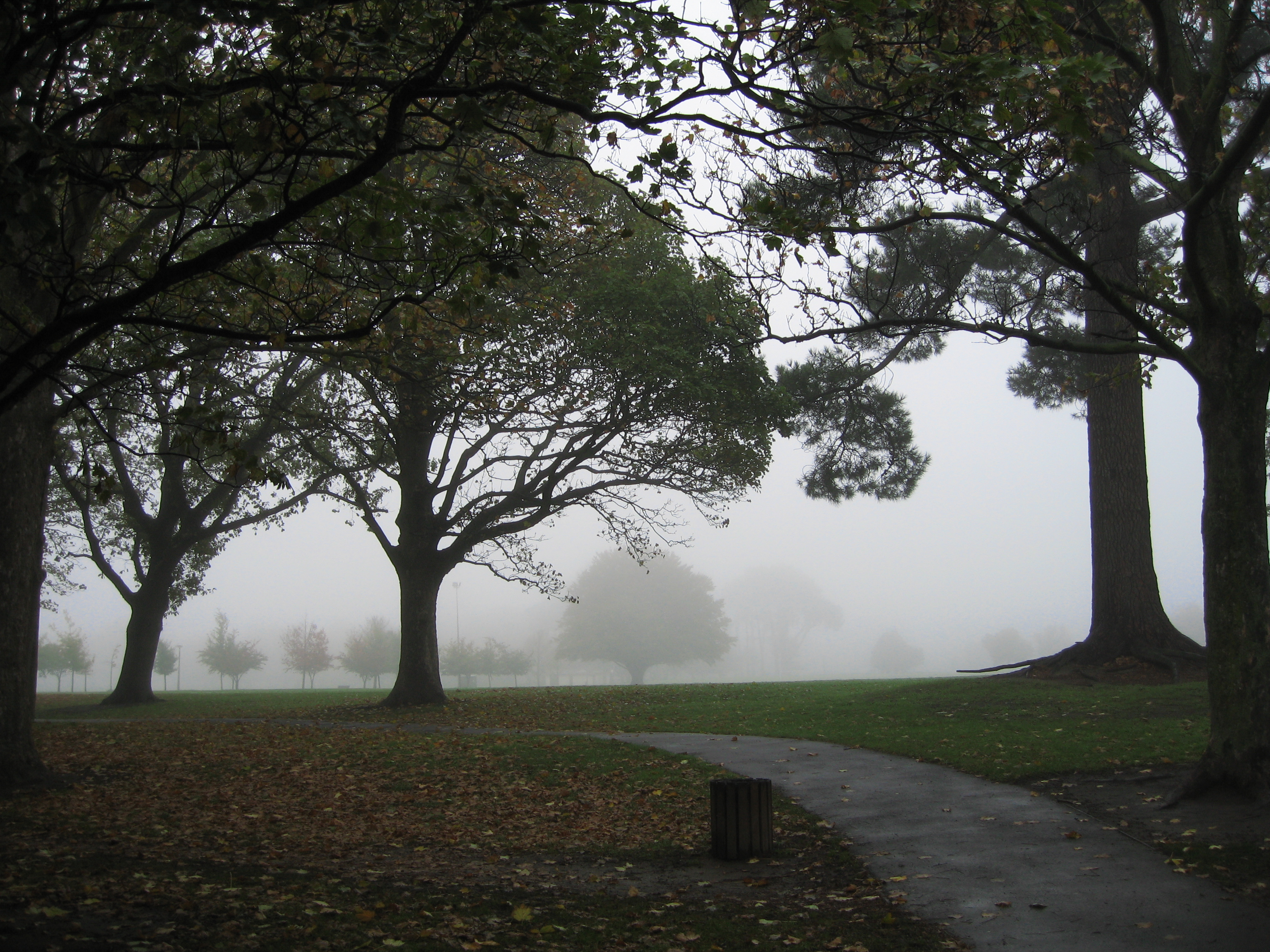
Foggy morning, North Hagley Park

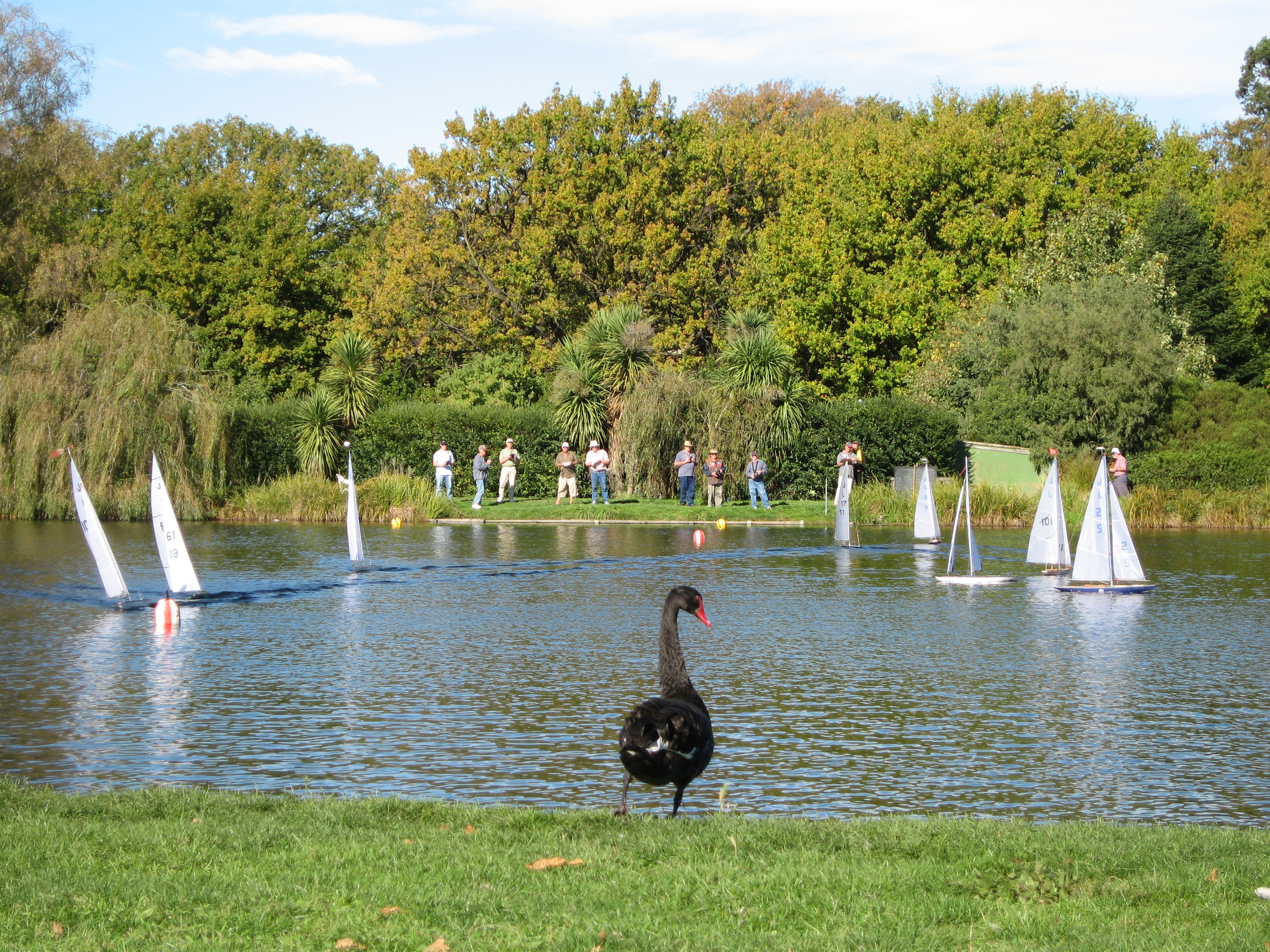
A black swan and model yachts on Victoria Lake

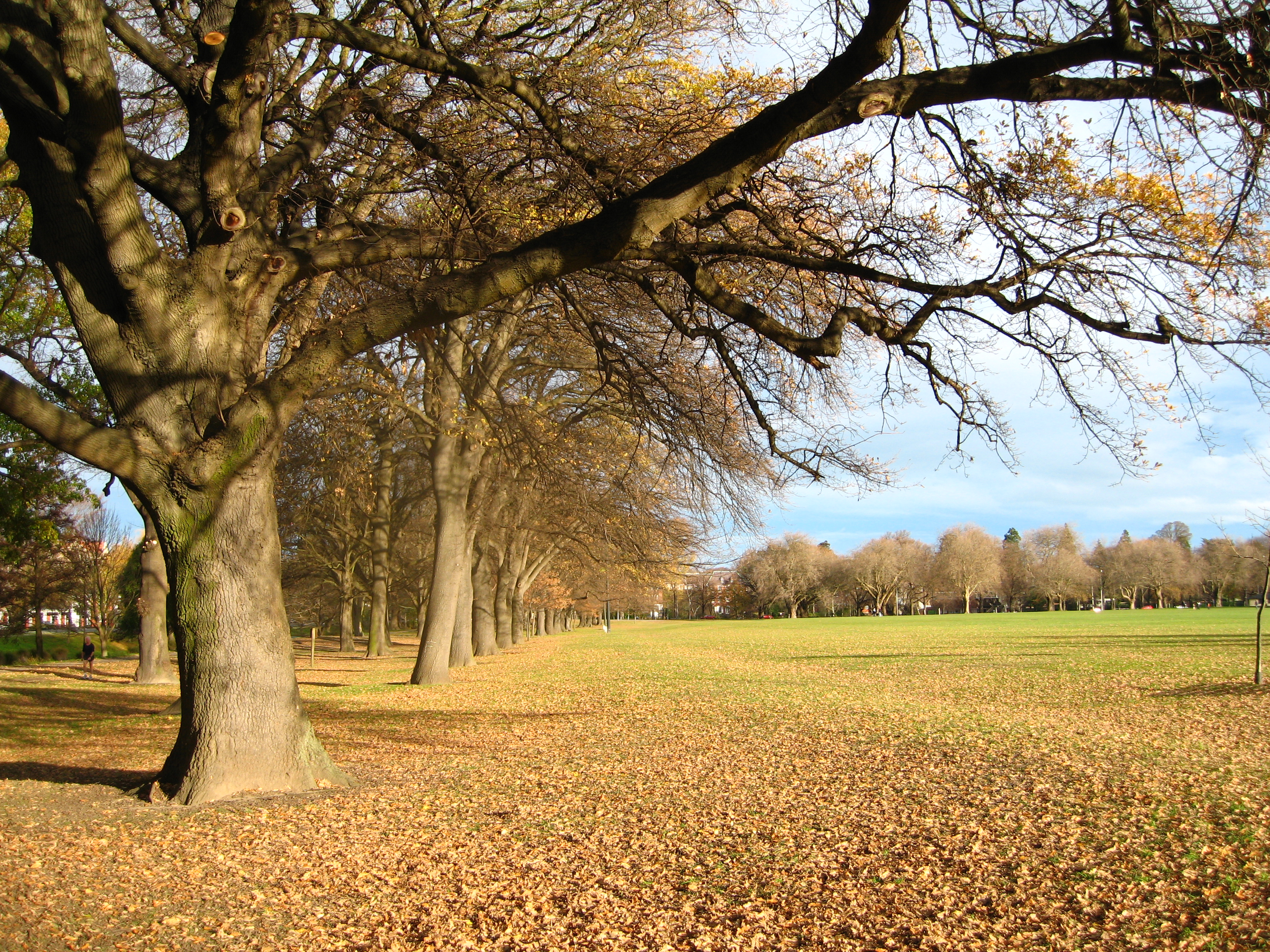
North Hagley Park in autumn

The weekly Saturday parkrun takes place at the North Hagley Park.
