= Aorangi School =

Location
- Colwyn Street, Bryndwr, Christchurch; 43.50600°S 172.59500°E

Information
- Type: State non-integrated co-educational contributing primary school
- Closed: 28 January 2010
- Ministry of Education Institution no.: 3278
- Principal: Stephanie Thompson
- Enrolment: 87
- Socio-economic decile: 3
- Website: https://web.archive.org/web/20090926142030/http://www.aorangi.ac.nz/

Aorangi School was located in the suburb of Bryndwr in Christchurch, Canterbury, New Zealand. The school was closed by the government on 27 January 2010.

About 40 of the former Aorangi School students transferred to Burnside Primary School. The last principal was Stephanie Thompson. The school's roll before closure was 87.

Former prime minister, John Key, was a student at Aorangi.

== See also ==
- List of schools in the Canterbury Region
