= St Albans, New Zealand =

Suburb of Christchurch, New Zealand

St Albans
- Suburb
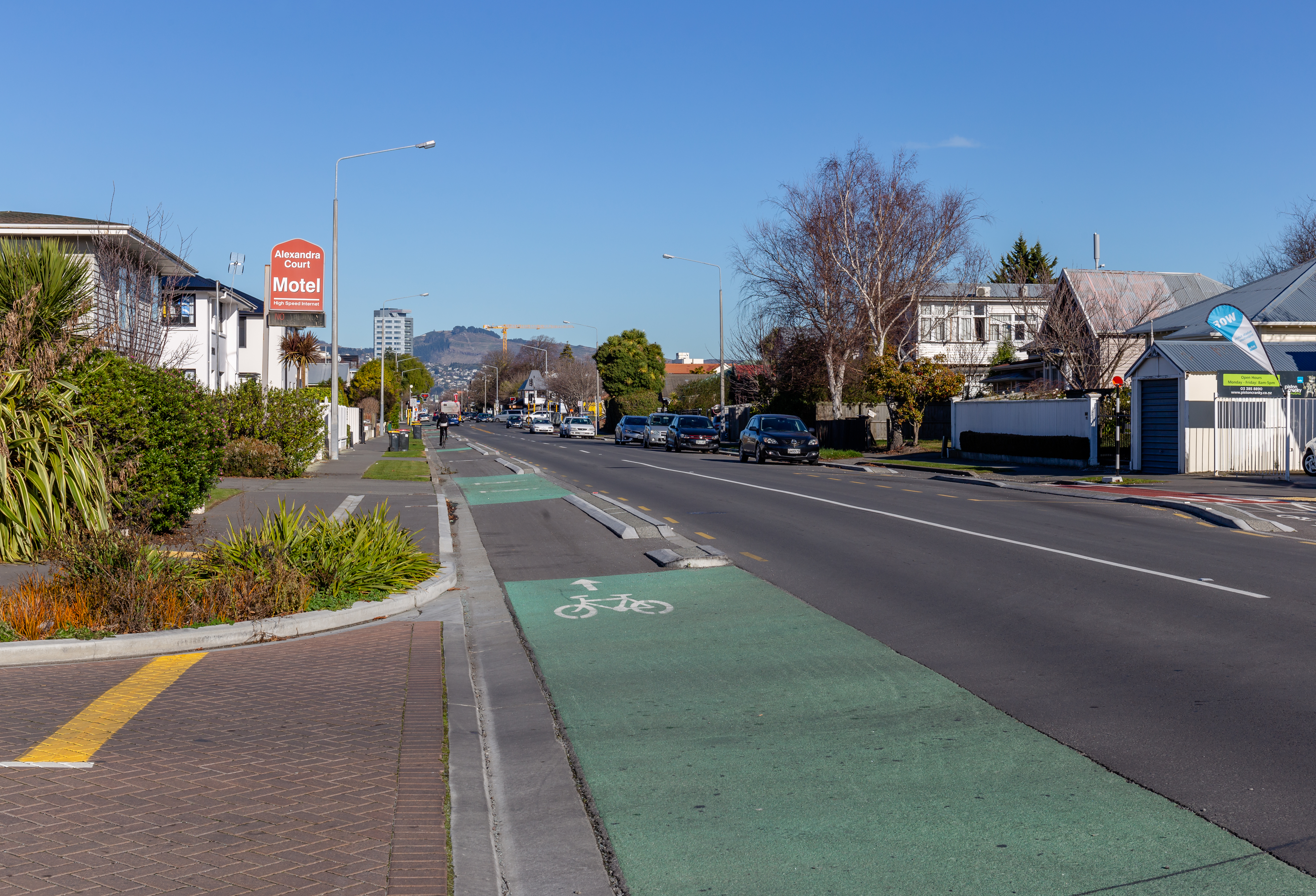
- Colombo Street, St Albans, looking south towards the city centre
- Interactive map of St Albans
- Coordinates: 43.508°S 172.630°E
- Country: New Zealand
- City: Christchurch
- Local authority: Christchurch City Council
- Electoral ward: Fendalton; Papanui; Innes
- Community board: Waimāero Fendalton-Waimairi-Harewood; Waipapa Papanui-Innes-Central

Area
  - Land: 397 ha (980 acres)

Population (June 2025)
  - Total: 15,010
  - Density: 3,780/km^{2} (9,790/sq mi)
- Postcode: 8014

Papanui	Northcote	Mairehau
Strowan; Merivale	St Albans	Edgeware
	Christchurch Central City

St Albans is a large, inner-northern suburb of Christchurch, New Zealand, located directly north of the Christchurch Central Business District. It is the second largest suburb in the city by population (behind Halswell), with a population of 13,137 at the 2018 Census. The suburb falls within the Christchurch Central electorate and is represented by Duncan Webb, who has been the member of parliament since the 2017 general election.

Its population largely consists of European New Zealanders. St Albans contains two primary schools and three recreational parks. The suburb is one of the most diverse residential neighbourhoods in Christchurch, with a wide range of densities, architectural styles and housing ages throughout the suburb. It includes rundown high-density council-owned flats, modern luxurious high-density flats and apartments, old mid-density workers’ cottages, and large low-density estates of various ages.

== History ==
The Māori were the first settlers in the area occupying modern-day Christchurch, the area was predominantly wetlands with patches of grasslands, the nearest permanent settlement was Puāri near Victoria Square, an important food-gathering place for local Māori.

Later, a working-class settlement, St Albans was a separate borough from 1881 until 1903 when it became part of Christchurch City. St Albans was named after George Dickinson's farm, which lay to the south of the St Albans Creek. He had called his farm St Albans in memory of his cousin Harriet Mellon, an actress, who had become the Duchess of St Albans.

=== Earthquake damage ===
The suburb escaped severe damage in the 2010 Canterbury earthquake. Many chimneys came down but only a few complete houses were affected. In the 22 February 2011 earthquake, however, the suburb was hit hard. Many houses, supermarkets, and shops were significantly damaged with a lot ending up totally demolished. In July 2011, the demolition of the former library, which houses the community centre, was ordered by the Canterbury Earthquake Recovery Authority. By 2014 the extent of the damage to drainage systems and lowered ground levels had become apparent, with the regular flooding of a series of streets known as the Flockton Basin.

== Boundaries ==
The suburb of St Albans is bordered by:

- Merivale to the west (west of Papanui Road – south of Innes Road)
- Strowan to the north-west (west of Papanui Road – north of Innes Road)
- Papanui to the north (north of Tomes Road)
- Mairehau to the north-east (east of Jamieson Avenue, Severn Street and Forfar Street – north of Warrington Street)
- Edgeware to the east (east of Forfar Street – south of Warrington Street and east of Madras Street – north of Bealey Avenue)
- Christchurch Central City to the south (south of Bealey Avenue)

These correspond roughly to the NZ localities area maintained by Fire and Emergency NZ.

=== Inconsistencies ===
The borders of St Albans are often disputed, particularly by real estate agents who often list higher-priced properties that lie within western St Albans as belonging to Merivale instead. The original borough of St Albans stretched to include most of modern-day Edgeware, Mairehau and Merivale as well as the current St Albans suburb. There is a sign off of Bealey Avenue which points to St Albans down Barbadoes Street which is actually in the middle of the suburb of Edgeware instead of St Albans.

In 2013, geography students at the University of Canterbury conducted a survey asking St Albans residents where they thought the boundaries lay. The findings differed from Christchurch City Council boundaries and New Zealand Post boundaries, in that residents perceived the boundary to be Innes Road to the north, Hills Road to the east, Bealey Avenue to the south and Papanui Road to the west.

== Demographics ==
St Albans covers 3.97 km^{2} (1.53 sq mi). It had an estimated population of 15,010 as of June 2025, with a population density of 3,781 people per km^{2}.

Historical population
Year	Pop.	±% p.a.
2006	12,987	—
2013	12,771	−0.24%
2018	13,137	+0.57%
2023	13,983	+1.26%

St Albans had a population of 13,983 in the 2023 New Zealand census, an increase of 846 people (6.4%) since the 2018 census, and an increase of 1,212 people (9.5%) since the 2013 census. There were 6,687 males, 7,209 females, and 87 people of other genders in 6,021 dwellings. 5.9% of people identified as LGBTIQ+. The median age was 36.0 years (compared with 38.1 years nationally). There were 2,085 people (14.9%) aged under 15 years, 3,402 (24.3%) aged 15 to 29, 6,441 (46.1%) aged 30 to 64, and 2,055 (14.7%) aged 65 or older.

People could identify as more than one ethnicity. The results were 81.1% European (Pākehā); 9.2% Māori; 2.7% Pasifika; 14.5% Asian; 2.4% Middle Eastern, Latin American and African New Zealanders (MELAA); and 2.0% other, which includes people giving their ethnicity as "New Zealander". English was spoken by 96.6%, Māori by 1.8%, Samoan by 0.4%, and other languages by 15.3%. No language could be spoken by 1.9% (e.g. too young to talk). New Zealand Sign Language was known by 0.4%. The percentage of people born overseas was 27.8, compared with 28.8% nationally.

Religious affiliations were 30.2% Christian, 2.2% Hindu, 1.5% Islam, 0.1% Māori religious beliefs, 1.2% Buddhist, 0.7% New Age, and 2.3% other religions. People who answered that they had no religion were 56.7%, and 5.3% of people did not answer the census question.

Of those at least 15 years old, 4,566 (38.4%) people had a bachelor's or higher degree, 5,421 (45.6%) had a post-high school certificate or diploma, and 1,908 (16.0%) people exclusively held high school qualifications. The median income was $48,100, compared with $41,500 nationally. 1,902 people (16.0%) earned over $100,000 compared to 12.1% nationally. The employment status of those at least 15 was 6,693 (56.3%) full-time, 1,599 (13.4%) part-time, and 282 (2.4%) unemployed.

Individual statistical areas
Name	Area (km^{2})	Population	Density (per km^{2})	Dwellings	Median age	Median income
Malvern	0.99	2,586	2,612	966	34.2 years	$50,400
Rutland	0.99	3,024	3,055	1,146	43.4 years	$51,400
St Albans North	0.64	2,325	3,633	1,083	36.8 years	$46,800
St Albans West	0.68	2,532	3,724	1,239	37.8 years	$46,400
St Albans East	0.68	3,519	5,175	1,587	32.7 years	$46,600
New Zealand					38.1 years	$41,500

== Community facilities ==
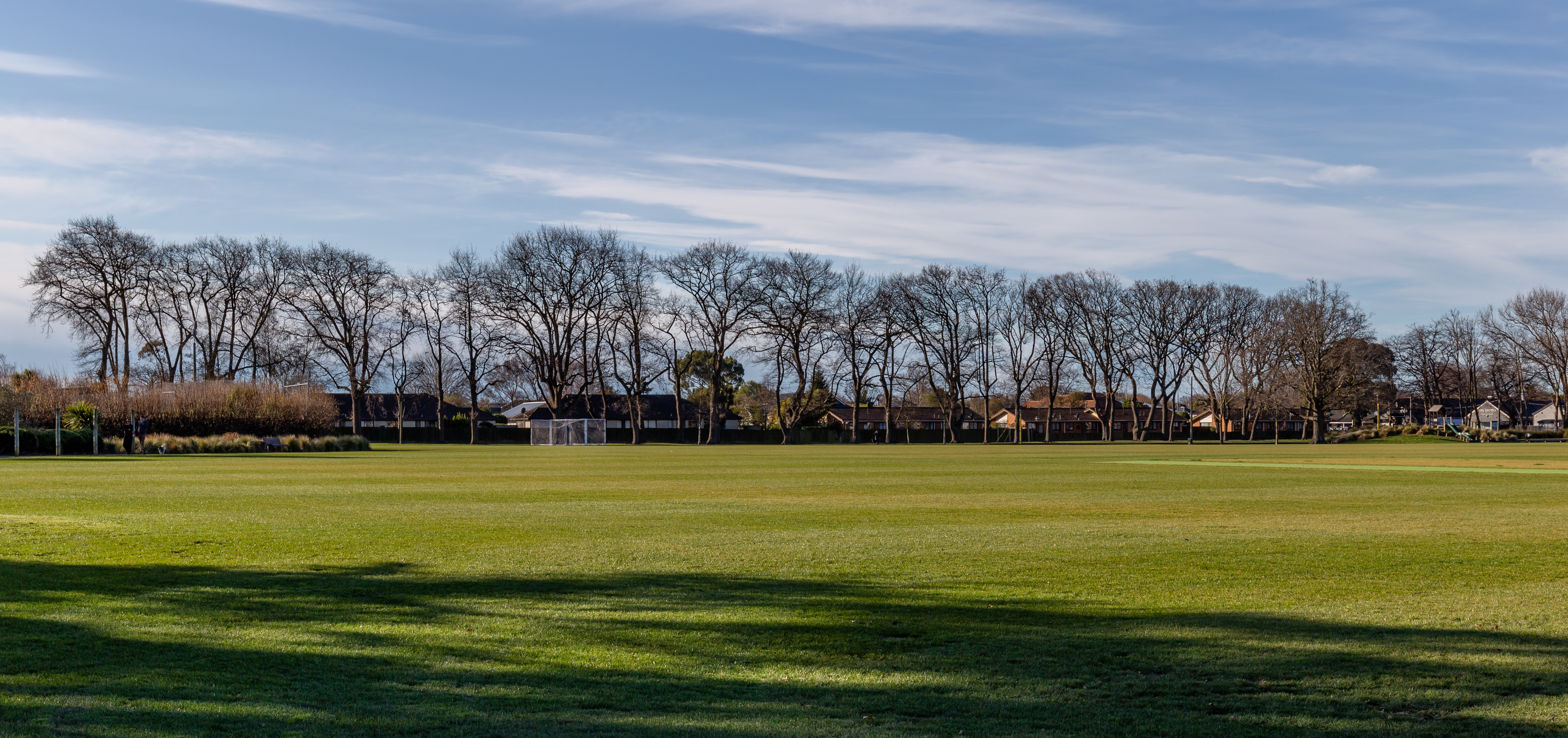
St Albans Park

The hub of St Albans is Edgeware Village on Edgeware Road which contains a small number of well-supported shops. The three main parks in the suburb are St Albans Park, Abberley Park, and Malvern Park. Sports facilities include Canterbury United Football Club's stadium, English Park, and Rugby Park, the home of the Crusaders professional rugby union team.

=== Education ===
The suburb contains two primary schools, St Albans Primary School and St Albans Catholic School, which both provide education for years 1 to 6. As of July 2026, they have rolls of 572 and 111 students, respectively. St Albans School opened in 1873 and St Albans Catholic School opened in 1955.

== St Albans News ==
St Albans is known for its sense of cohesiveness and community spirit. This has manifested itself in the local monthly paper, the St Albans Neighbourhood News, which was first published by a group of local residents in 1993 and is still going to this day under the name of St Albans News. Distributed to 5,000 homes and businesses, the paper has recently been expanded to fill 16 pages. Over the years it has been central in numerous community-related issues including local planning, Packe Street Park, the Edgeware Road Tragedy, and the closure of Edgeware swimming pool (to which it was editorially opposed). After the community regained control of the pool site, it was announced that the pool would be rebuilt with a generous donation from a local resident.

== Notable residents ==
- Hugh Acland (1874–1956), prominent surgeon and later owner of Chippenham
- John Evans Brown (1827–1895), first MP for St Albans, after whom Browns Rd is named, and resident at Chippenham
- Richard Hadlee (born 1951), international cricketer
- Tane Norton (1942–2023), All Black, local resident and businessowner
- Violet Targuse (1884–1937), playwright, lived on Bretts Road at time of death
- The Wizard of New Zealand (born 1932), lived in the suburb until his Cranford Street home was destroyed by fire in September 2003
