= Papanui =

Suburb of Christchurch, New Zealand

- Suburb
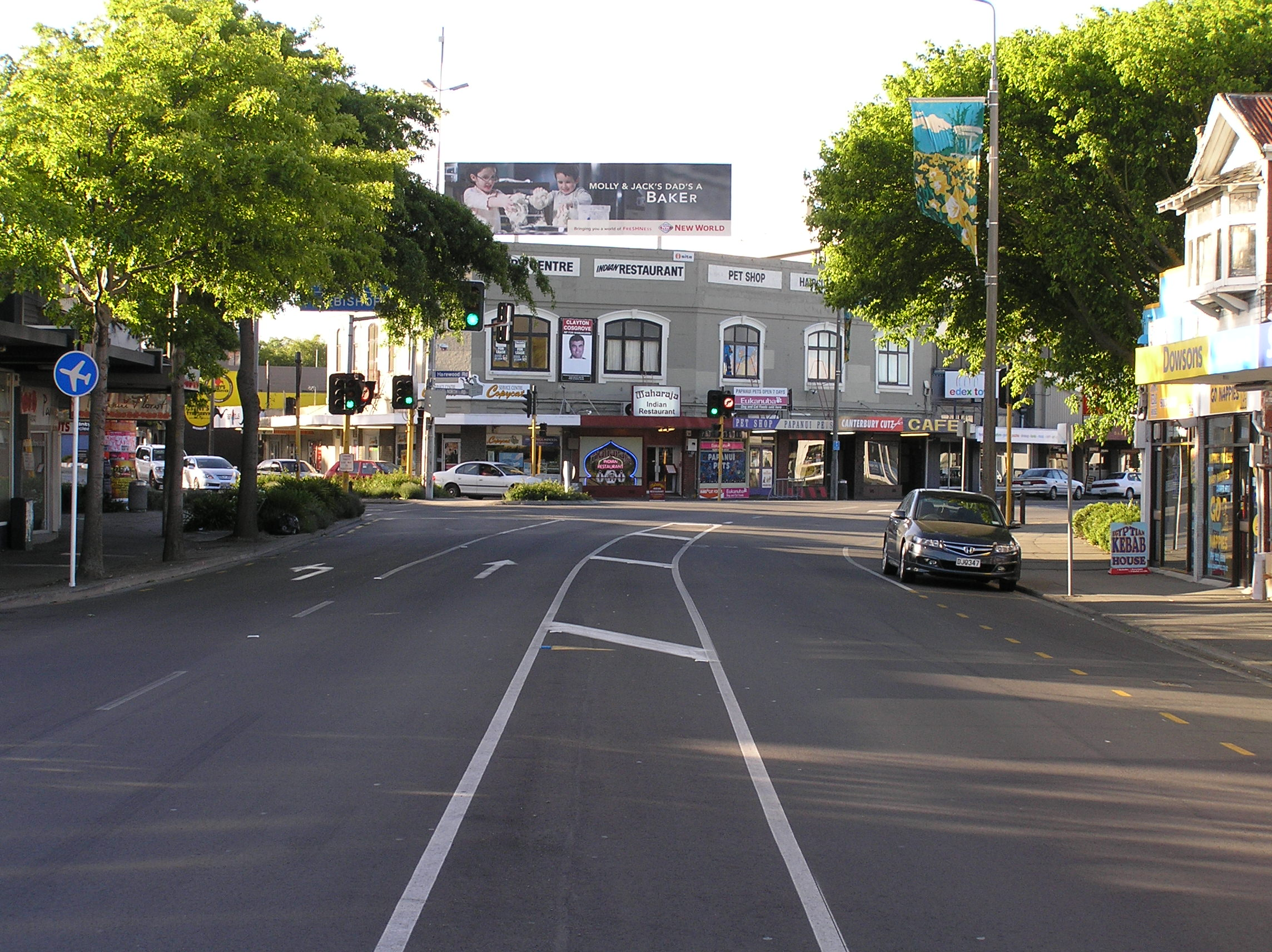
- Papanui Junction with the 99-year-old Papanui Building centred. Taken from Papanui Road with the Main North Road leading away to the right and Harewood Road leading away to the left. (2008)
- Interactive map of Papanui
- Coordinates: 43°30′S 172°37′E
- Country: New Zealand
- City: Christchurch
- Local authority: Christchurch City Council
- Electoral ward: Papanui
- Community board: Waipapa Papanui-Innes-Central

Area
  - Land: 306 ha (760 acres)

Population (June 2025)
  - Total: 7,740
  - Density: 2,530/km^{2} (6,550/sq mi)

	Casebrook	Northcote
Bishopdale	Papanui	Mairehau
Bryndwr	Strowan	St Albans

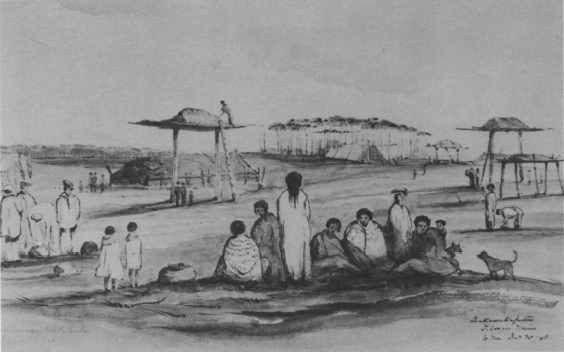
Rakawakaputu Māori village on the Canterbury Plains with the surveyors Capt. Thomas, Heaphy, White and Torlesse on the left (sketched by William Fox in 1848)

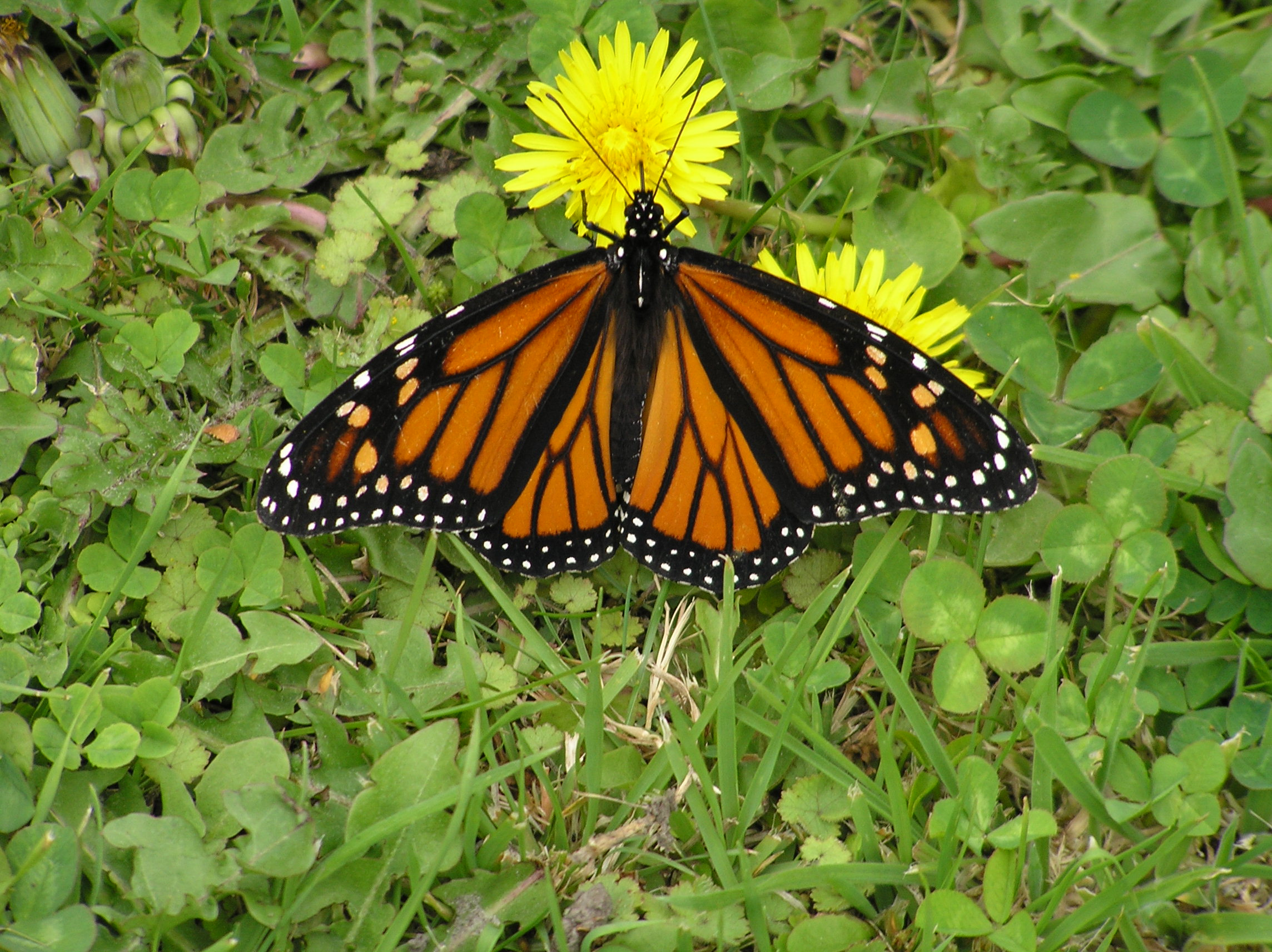
Monarch butterflies can be seen in great abundance in St James Park in late autumn and early winter

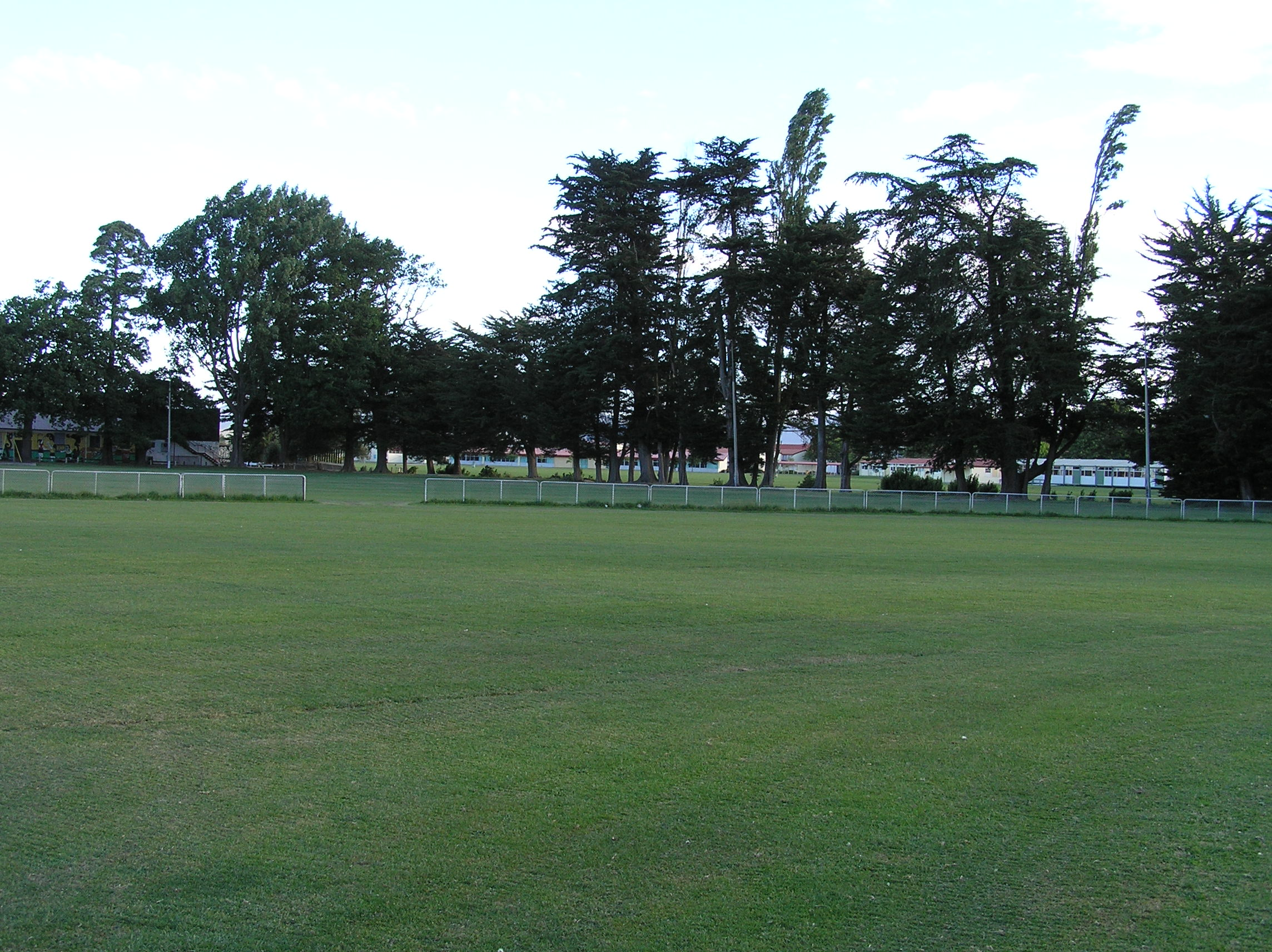
Papanui in spring 2008 showing the domain where the pre-colonisation bush once stood with Papanui High School in the background

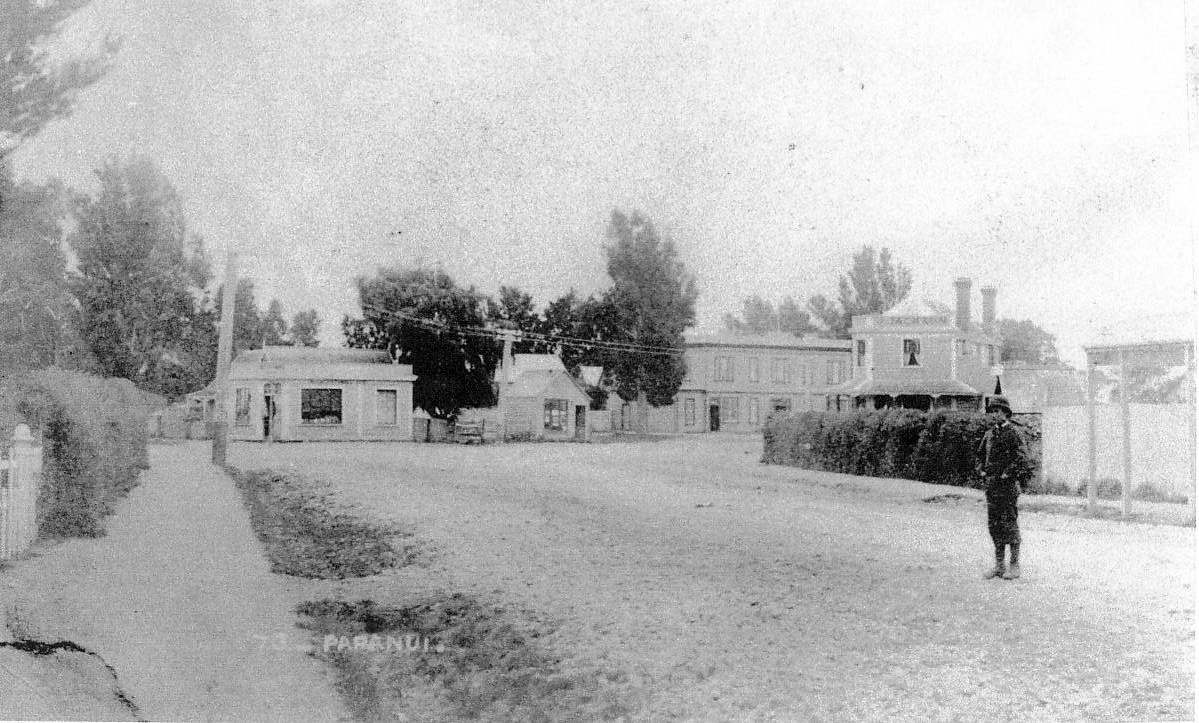
Papanui Junction looking from Papanui Road towards the Papanui Hotel sited on the Main North Road and Jacksons Seven Oaks Butchery (with two chimneys) in the late 1870s

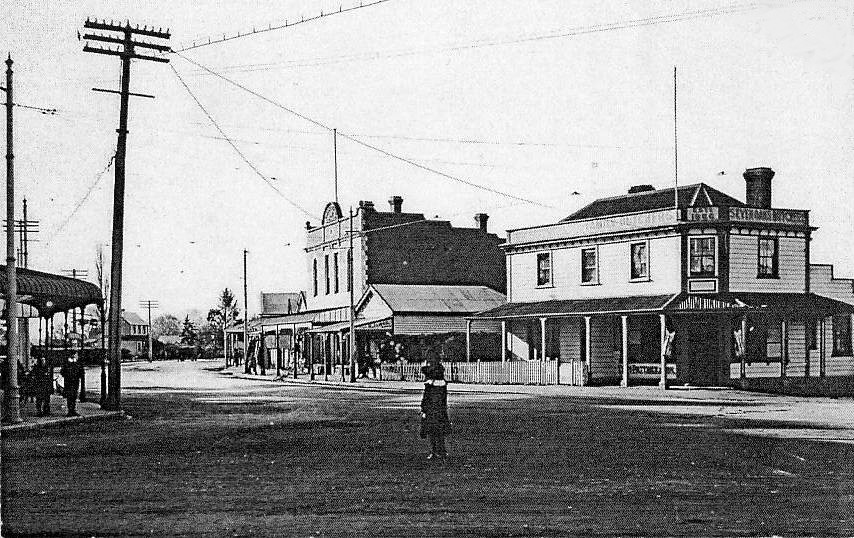
Papanui Junction circa 1913 looking up Main North Road, showing the Seven Oak Butchery to the right; tram tracks and overhead power wires can also be seen

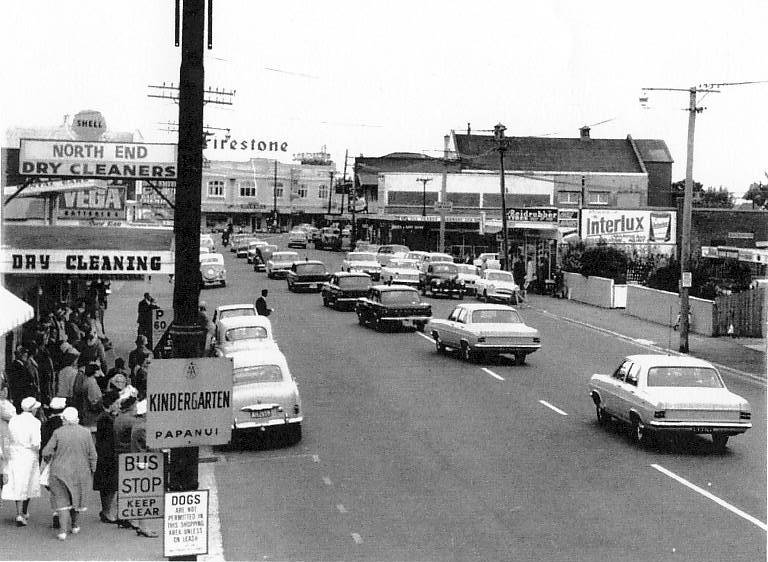
Looking towards Papanui Junction (c. 1967); a Police funeral cortège leaves St Giles Church; note the Firestone Tyre sign that dominated the skyline for several decades

Papanui is a suburb of Christchurch, New Zealand. It is situated five kilometres to the northwest of the city centre. Papanui has a population of 3,645 consisting predominantly of Pākehā (New Zealand European & Others) 86.9%, Asian 7.6%, Māori 5.3%, Pacific peoples 3.1%, Middle Eastern/Latin American/African 0.7% (2013 census). The suburb is located at the junction of three busy thoroughfares; Papanui Road leading to the city, the Main North Road that leads to North Canterbury and Harewood Road that leads to Christchurch International Airport. However, as with most Christchurch suburbs, Papanui has no defined borders.

Over the last 160 years Papanui has developed into a major suburban centre and is a satellite centre for Government and City Council services. These include the central government 'Super Centre' in Winstone Avenue, Housing New Zealand in Restell Street and the Council Service Centre and Library on Langdons Road. The area has two high schools and five primary schools. There is little farm land left in the suburb with most of it having been developed into residential and commercial properties.

== Etymology ==
The Māori name Papanui literally translated means 'Big plain' (papa means flat and nui means big), a name which would aptly suit most of central Christchurch, which is one of New Zealand's flattest cities. Another meaning, equally applicable to the district in the early days, is a platform set in the branches of a tree to accommodate a bird-spearer. A third meaning for the word Papanui comes from a Māori Legend and refers to a large funeral pyre. According to the legend, Tuhaitara, a Ngāi Tahu princess, sent her eldest son, Tamarairoa to Papanui to kill her former husband Marukore. But Marukore was aware of his son's intentions and when Tamarairoa and his younger brother arrived, Marukore killed them both and burnt their bodies on a huge pyre.

== History ==
=== Pre-European ===
Before European settlement Papanui, like much of Christchurch, was mostly marshy ground covered with native flax, toetoe and raupō brush. There was an abundance of forest birds which were hunted for food by the area's Māori inhabitants. It is believed in 1800 possibly as many as 5000 Māori lived in Canterbury, but from disease like measles and influenza, introduced through the early whaling settlements on Banks Peninsula, and through tribal wars the number had fallen to around 500 in 1840. While most of the plains in the South Island of New Zealand were deforested by either the Māori or Pākehā, Papanui Bush was one of the few stands of pine and tōtara left in the Canterbury region at the time of European colonisation.

=== European colonisation ===
The Canterbury Association's surveyor Captain Joseph Thomas and his team of surveyors arrived in Lyttelton (originally named Port Cooper) on 15 December 1848 on the ship Fly. They began to survey the Port Hills and Canterbury Plains around what would become Christchurch and its suburbs. As chief agent for the association Thomas was also responsible for preparing the infrastructure for the arrival of the first settlers at Lyttelton in December 1850. The First Four Ships, Charlotte Jane, Randolph, Sir George Seymour and Cressy landed 773 colonists. By the first anniversary of the first landing fifteen more ships had arrived bringing the colonist population to 3,000. By 1876 the estimated population of the city and suburbs was around 23,000 with the number increasing to 44,000 by 1886.

=== Papanui Bush ===
When the pilgrims first began to settle in Christchurch in the early 1851, Papanui Bush attracted a number of sawyers who made a living from milling tōtara and pine timber for construction and fire wood. Near the bush a settlement sprung up along on the old Māori track leading north to Kaiapoi which eventually became the Main North Road. The settlement soon boasted a hotel, store, blacksmiths, clothing shop, butchers, chemist, dispensers, and a school room appeared in 1853. Due to the pressing need for building materials in Christchurch, Papanui Road was one of the first roads built outside the city boundaries. The Papanui Bridge was also built over the Avon River in March 1852 to allow the timber to be brought by bullock drawn wagons directly into the Market Square near the city centre. In 1857 sawmilling had attracted a population of 692 to the Papanui village compared with 953 in Christchurch in the same year.

=== Farm land ===
By 1857 most of the trees in the area were felled and market gardening and orchards began to flourish. The land around Papanui proved to be remarkably fertile for farming once ditches and drains were dug to relieve the swampy areas. Gradually more immigrants settled in Papanui, crops were sown and sheep and dairy farms were established in the surrounding areas. Exports of wheat and wool soon became the main source of income for the province. From the mid-1880s frozen mutton shipments, from the nearby Canterbury Frozen Meat Company in Belfast, to the U.K. grew steadily and eventually surpassed other exports to become the main export earner. In the 1890s butter shipments joined the export trade with the Fernleaf brand becoming as well known as 'Canterbury Lamb'. As settlement of Christchurch continued farms were sold for residential and commercial developments with Papanui being transformed into a suburb which became part of Christchurch city in 1923.

=== Hotels ===
One of the first buildings in the area was the Sawyers Arms Hotel which was opened by an American named Robert Carr. The hotel was built on the Main North Road near the corner of Sawyers Arms Road which derived its name from the hotel. Henry Roil was also "mine host" at the hotel in the early years as a partner of Carr's. The hotel burnt down twice, firstly in November 1874 and was reopened by the current licensee John Wild in June 1875. The second fire occurred in September 1898 and was rebuilt by the licensee John Cooper and was renamed The Phoenix (the beautiful bird rising from the ashes) for its third incarnation. This building was finally demolished in February 1989 in a Supermarket redevelopment with the site eventually being encompassed by the Northlands Shopping Centre.

The Papanui Hotel was originally built in the early 1850s as a parsonage for the Reverend Bradley. The building was bought in 1859 by William Meddings, a local blacksmith and store keeper, who opened it as a hotel. In 1865 the hotel was bought by William Lawrence who rebuilt the front section in 1871. Lawrence passed the hotel on to his son William in 1898, and it is believed it remained in the Lawrence family ownership until 1906. The grounds boasted gardens, lawns, fruit trees, walkways and a skittle bowling alley. In 1957 a new public and lounge bar complex was built on the corner of the Main North Road and Winstone Avenue adjacent to the old building which was finally demolished in March 1969 having served as a landmark for 110 years.

=== 2010–2011 earthquakes ===
Papanui's location in the north western area of the city saved it from the worst of the liquefaction that was suffered by the eastern and southern areas. The Papanui Building (the first photo on this page) at 1 Main North Road was severely damaged by the first two main earthquakes and demolition commenced on 23 February 2011, the day after the second earthquake. All of the churches in the area were damaged to some extent. The St Paul's Vicarage was particularly badly damaged and has been demolished. St Paul's Anglican Church is still under repair with the scaffolding now being removed from the bell tower. A source close to the parish says it will reopen in September 2013. St Giles Presbyterian Church was also un-repairable and has been demolished. Only the parish centre now remains there. The status of St Joseph's Catholic Church and the Papanui North Methodist Church repair or demolition has still not been resolved. The Sanitarium factory was also significantly damaged and although production was halted for a while it is online with repairs being made. Many of the older shops in the Papanui Village were substantially damaged and demolished.

== Demographics ==
Papanui comprises four statistical areas. Papanui North, Papanui West and Papanui South are primarily residential, and Northlands is mostly commercial. It covers 3.06 km^{2} (1.18 sq mi) and had an estimated population of 7,740 as of June 2025, with a population density of 2,529 people per km^{2}.

Individual statistical areas
Name	Area (km^{2})	Population	Density (per km^{2})	Dwellings	Median age	Median income
Papanui North	0.60	2,037	3,395	798	39.5 years	$28,700
Papanui West	1.00	2,988	2,988	1,146	40.3 years	$39,800
Papanui East	0.83	2,286	2,754	984	45.7 years	$42,500
Northlands	0.63	123	195	51	41.1 years	$34,700
New Zealand					38.1 years	$41,500

=== Residential Papanui ===
The residential areas of Papanui, comprising the statistical areas of Papanui North, Papanui West and Papanui East, cover 2.43 km^{2} (0.94 sq mi). They had an estimated population of 7,590 as of June 2025, with a population density of 3,123 people per km^{2}.

Historical population for residential areas
Year	Pop.	±% p.a.
2006	6,984	—
2013	7,230	+0.50%
2018	7,260	+0.08%
2023	7,311	+0.14%

The residential areas had a population of 7,311 in the 2023 New Zealand census, an increase of 51 people (0.7%) since the 2018 census, and an increase of 81 people (1.1%) since the 2013 census. There were 3,339 males, 3,939 females, and 36 people of other genders in 2,928 dwellings. 3.7% of people identified as LGBTIQ+. There were 1,188 people (16.2%) aged under 15 years, 1,320 (18.1%) aged 15 to 29, 3,114 (42.6%) aged 30 to 64, and 1,686 (23.1%) aged 65 or older.

People could identify as more than one ethnicity. The results were 76.2% European (Pākehā); 10.1% Māori; 3.7% Pasifika; 17.3% Asian; 1.8% Middle Eastern, Latin American and African New Zealanders (MELAA); and 2.0% other, which includes people giving their ethnicity as "New Zealander". English was spoken by 96.4%, Māori by 1.7%, Samoan by 0.9%, and other languages by 17.4%. No language could be spoken by 1.5% (e.g. too young to talk). New Zealand Sign Language was known by 0.5%. The percentage of people born overseas was 27.4, compared with 28.8% nationally.

Religious affiliations were 38.8% Christian, 2.5% Hindu, 1.2% Islam, 0.2% Māori religious beliefs, 1.0% Buddhist, 0.4% New Age, 0.1% Jewish, and 1.9% other religions. People who answered that they had no religion were 48.7%, and 5.3% of people did not answer the census question.

Of those at least 15 years old, 1,737 (28.4%) people had a bachelor's or higher degree, 2,847 (46.5%) had a post-high school certificate or diploma, and 1,542 (25.2%) people exclusively held high school qualifications. 627 people (10.2%) earned over $100,000 compared to 12.1% nationally. The employment status of those at least 15 was 2,781 (45.4%) full-time, 837 (13.7%) part-time, and 144 (2.4%) unemployed.

=== Northlands ===
Northlands covers 0.63 km^{2} (0.24 sq mi). It had an estimated population of 150 as of June 2025, with a population density of 238 people per km^{2}.

Historical population for Northlands
Year	Pop.	±% p.a.
2006	120	—
2013	123	+0.35%
2018	123	+0.00%
2023	123	+0.00%

Northlands had a population of 123 in the 2023 New Zealand census, unchanged since the 2018 census, and unchanged since the 2013 census. There were 57 males and 66 females in 51 dwellings. 4.9% of people identified as LGBTIQ+. The median age was 41.1 years (compared with 38.1 years nationally). There were 27 people (22.0%) aged under 15 years, 18 (14.6%) aged 15 to 29, 48 (39.0%) aged 30 to 64, and 30 (24.4%) aged 65 or older.

People could identify as more than one ethnicity. The results were 70.7% European (Pākehā); 14.6% Māori; 2.4% Pasifika; 26.8% Asian; and 7.3% Middle Eastern, Latin American and African New Zealanders (MELAA). English was spoken by 95.1%, Māori by 2.4%, and other languages by 22.0%. The percentage of people born overseas was 31.7, compared with 28.8% nationally.

Religious affiliations were 26.8% Christian, 7.3% Hindu, 7.3% Islam, and 2.4% other religions. People who answered that they had no religion were 53.7%, and 2.4% of people did not answer the census question.

Of those at least 15 years old, 18 (18.8%) people had a bachelor's or higher degree, 51 (53.1%) had a post-high school certificate or diploma, and 30 (31.2%) people exclusively held high school qualifications. The median income was $34,700, compared with $41,500 nationally. 6 people (6.2%) earned over $100,000 compared to 12.1% nationally. The employment status of those at least 15 was 42 (43.8%) full-time, 18 (18.8%) part-time, and 3 (3.1%) unemployed.

== Economy ==
From the 2013 census, the median income in Papanui is NZ$34,100 compared to a median of $24,800 for Christchurch. In the higher income bracket, 34.0% of the population earns more than $50,000 compared to 27.1% which is the Christchurch average. Most of the population is employed in retail, distribution, sawmills, the apparel industry and the meat works. Unemployment in Papanui is currently low — 3.4% according to figures from the Ministry of Social Development (end of 2007).

=== Industry ===
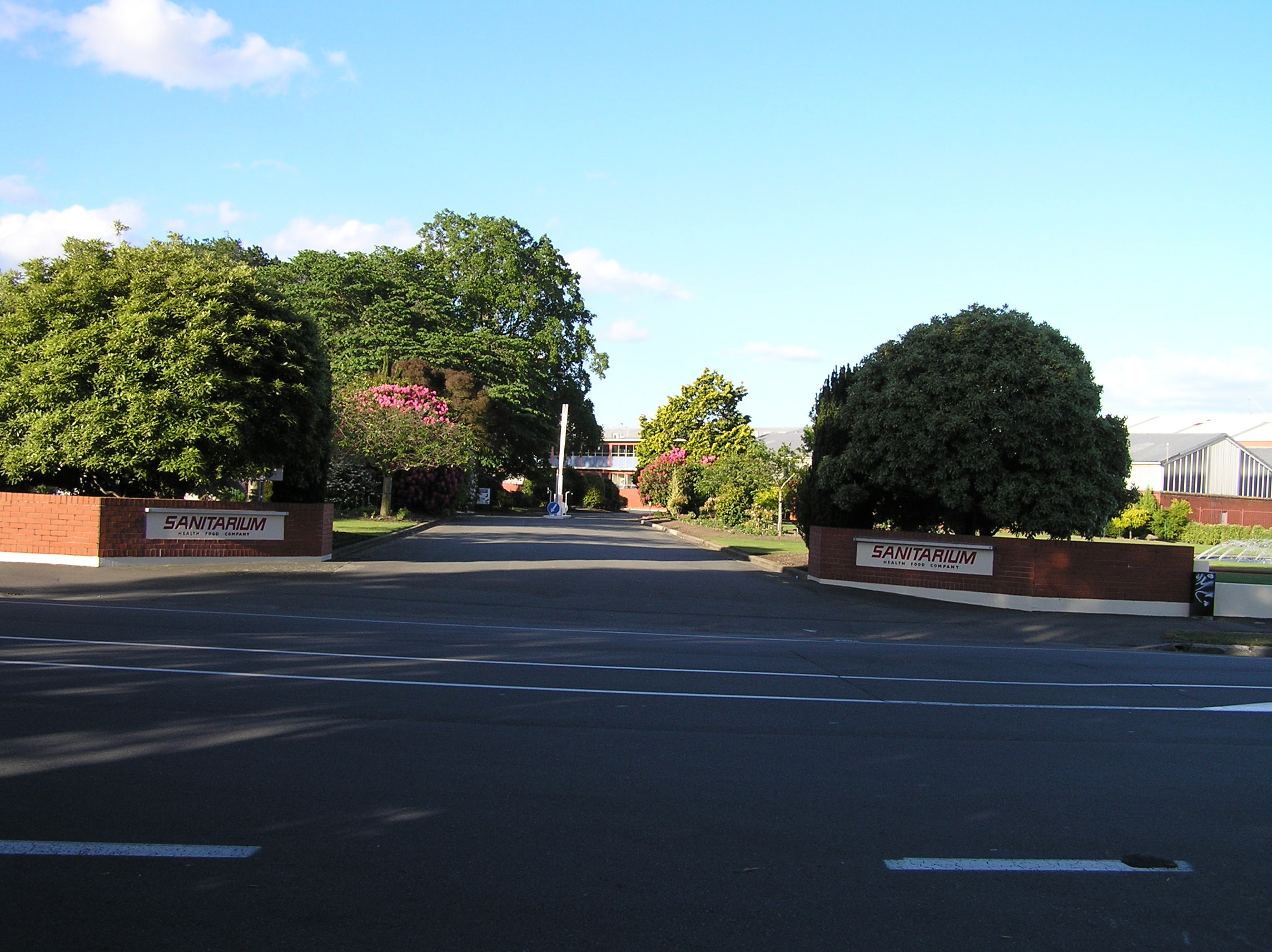
Sanitarium Factory and gardens (2008)

For much of the 20th century, Papanui was a light industrial area. In 1900, Edward Halsey, a baker trained at Sanitarium in Michigan in the United States, emigrated to New Zealand and began making health foods in a wooden shed in Papanui, including Granola, New Zealand's first breakfast cereal. Halsey's business was successful, and the Sanitarium Health Food factory was built on the side of Halseys shed in 1919. It is still in operation today; however it was rebuilt in 1966 after being destroyed in a fire. Over recent decades Sanitarium's Harewood Road factory has been awarded many honours for its prize winning gardens.

The building of the Firestone (now Bridgestone) tyre factory, in Langdons Road, was commenced on land, some of which was a 5-acre orchard purchased from the Cone family, in 1945. Firestone produced New Zealand's first pneumatic tyre in 1948. This factory remained the only tyre manufacturer in the South Island.
On 23 October 2009, it was announced that Bridgestone's Australia and New Zealand manufacturing operations were to close. The announcement affected 275 jobs in Christchurch. In November 2010 the company has returned 3.2 acres of the former orchard land alongside the railway line to the city to be used as a public wetlands.

The delicatessen meat company, Verkerks, built a factory on Vagues Road in 1961, and has been stocking the small goods shelves ever since.

Though both of these factories are still in operation today but not so for the Ovaltine factory on the Main North Road and the Birdseye Frozen Foods factory which used to be sited next to the railway line in Harewood Road.

=== Retail ===
The original Papanui shopping village is located at the Papanui Junction.

Northlands Shopping Centre opened in Papanui in 1967. It covers 32,201 m^{2}, with 103 shops and 1,251 carparks. The mall's anchor tenants are The Warehouse, Pak'nSave, Countdown and Farmers.

== Features ==
=== Churches ===
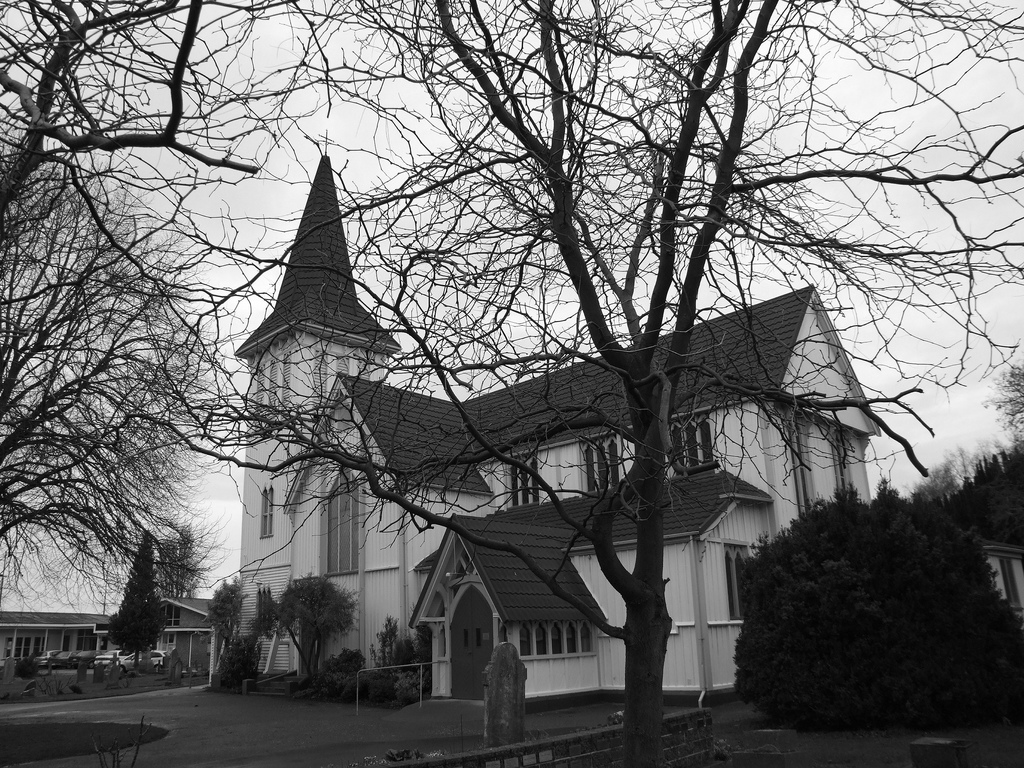
St Paul's Anglican Church and grave yard as seen in winter 2008

The area is home to one of the oldest parishes on the Canterbury plains. Established in 1853, St Paul's Anglican Church on Harewood Road was enlarged twice before being rebuilt using kauri timber in 1877 to the design of the notable architect Benjamin Mountfort. In 1880 a peal of five bells was presented to the church by Mr J T Matson. This was the first ring of bells suitable for change ringing to be installed in New Zealand and is the only ringable set in the country of eight bells housed in a wooden tower. St Paul's has the additional distinction of being the only parish church in New Zealand with bells for change ringing – the other rings are in cathedrals. The original ring of five bells was ordered in 1878. Some time later, ringing was suspended because the tower was no longer strong enough but a new one was constructed in 1912 and it was again strengthened in 1981 by an internal steel frame. The set is a light weight ring for change ringing with the tenor at 317 kg which protects the tower. A sixth bell was added in 1970 and two more in 1983.

The second oldest church in the area is the Papanui Methodist Church which was established in 1859. The second church was built in 1870 and the third and present church was opened in 1913 on the corner of Harewood Road and Chapel Street.

This was followed By St Giles Presbyterian Church which was first built in 1877 on the Main North Road three doors past the current Catholic church. In 1895 the church was further enlarged but this eventually proved to be insufficient and in 1924 a new church was built on the corner of Papanui Road and Frank Street.

St Joseph's Catholic Church conducted services in the St Josesph's School Chapel, designed by Mr Jacobson and built on Vagues Road, from 1878 until the current church was built on the corner of the Main North Road and Vagues Road in March 1922. The Parish was formally established in 1924 with Fr Hanrahan as the first incumbent priest.

The Papanui Baptist Church was established in 1958 and is located on Sawyers Road opposite to Morrison Avenue.

The Papanui Seventh-day Adventist Church is located on Grants Road adjoining the Christchurch Adventist School.

=== Parks ===
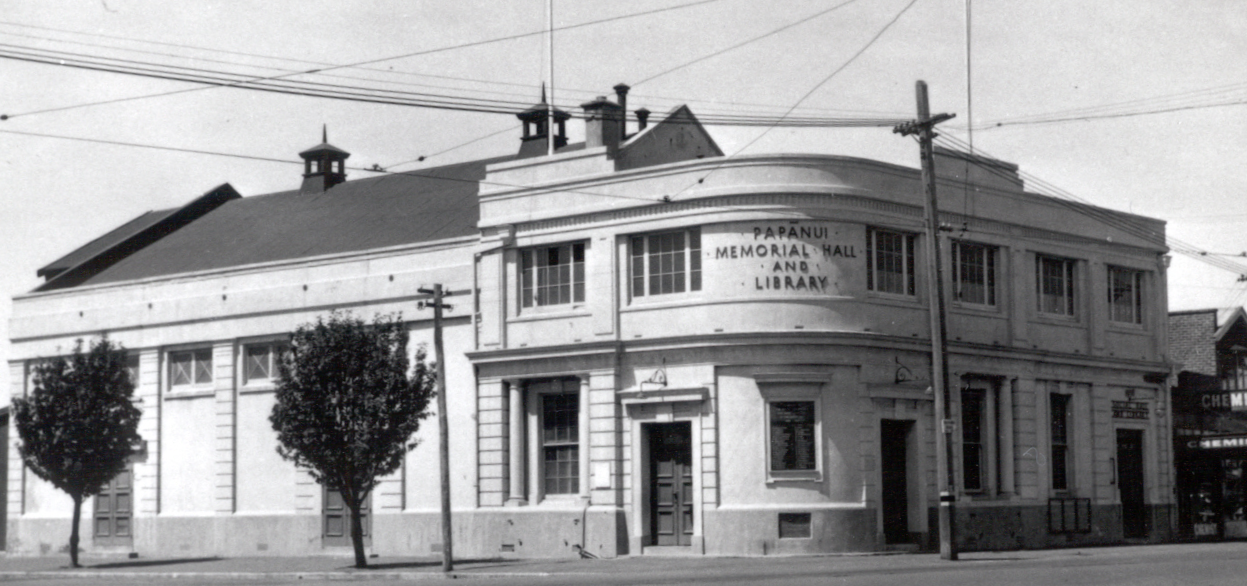
Papanui Memorial Hall and Library opened in 1923 to commemorate the fallen of World War I; it was sited at the Papanui Junction on the corner of Horner Street

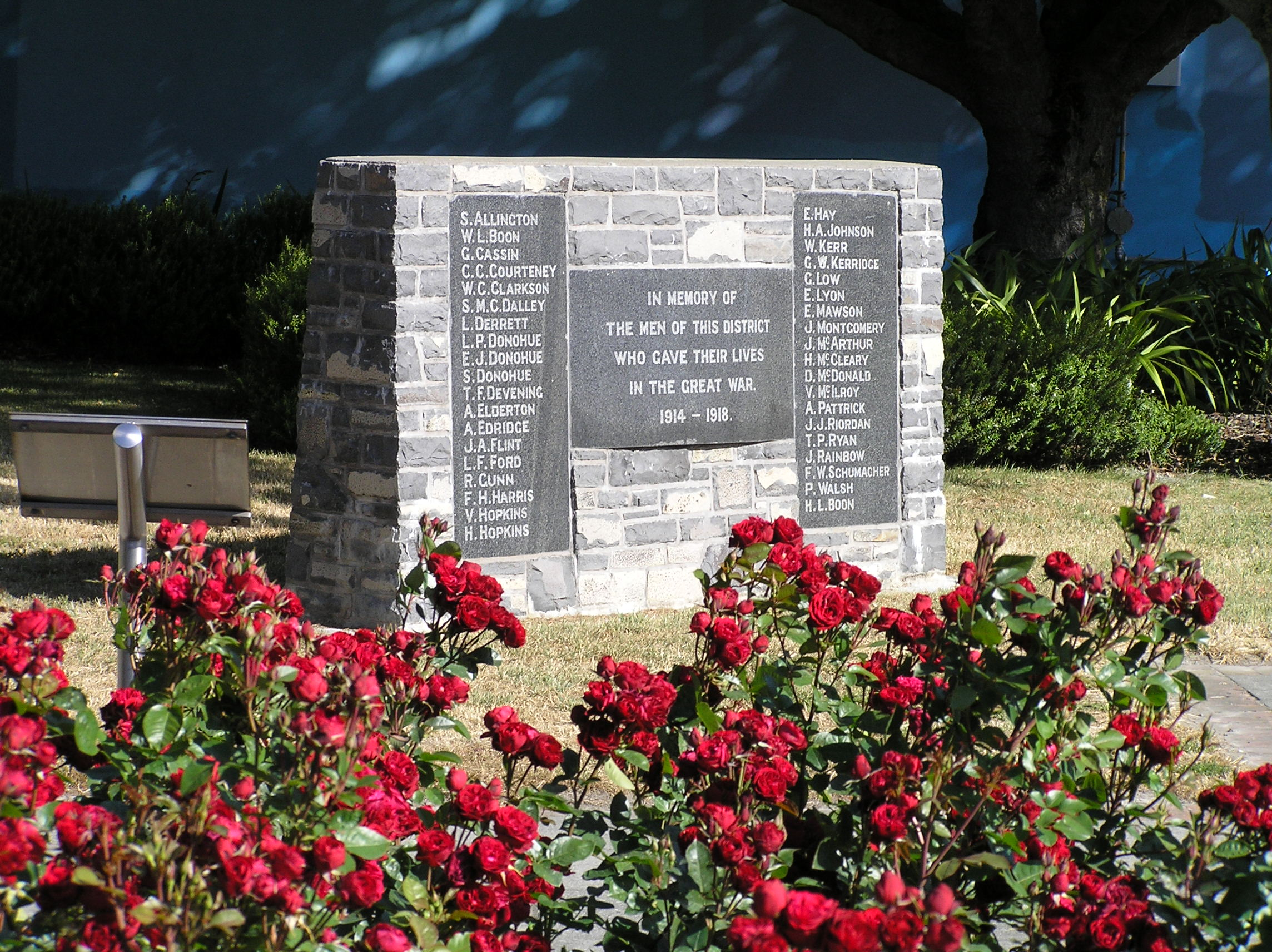
Papanui War Memorial and Rose Garden on the corner Papanui Road and Horner Street, December 2008

There are numerous reserves and parks within the suburban boundaries, the two most notable of these are as follow:

The Papanui Domain sited on Sawyers Arms Road where the Papanui Bush was clear felled in the 1850s. It is predominantly used for rugby league and softball, with the rugby league clubrooms adjoining on the southern boundary. In the early days it was also used for cycle racing.

St James Park, most likely named after its road frontage, is predominantly used for croquet, cricket and soccer. With its lush tree lined walkways and gardens, it alongside other parks in Christchurch serve as the over-wintering location for monarch butterflies usually starting late autumn to early winter.

=== Landmarks ===
In the 1920s the residents wanted a fitting memorial to the fallen soldiers of World War I. Duly the Memorial Hall and Library (pictured above) was built and opened in the heart of Papanui 1923. This building served as the Town Hall, library and picture theatre for over 50 years, until it was demolished in the late 1970s with the land reverting to a reserve. In 1997 the Returned Services Association prevailed upon the council to redevelop the site as a war memorial reserve and to include the names of the fallen soldiers from World War II.

== Transportation ==
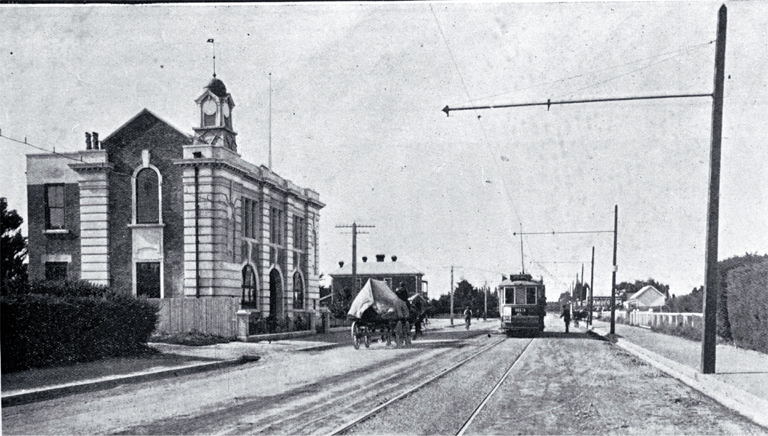
The first Tram on the Northcote line near Papanui. On the left is the Waimairi County Council Chambers and the Phoenix Hotel can be seen in the background. (1913)

From the first days of colonisation horses and bullocks provided the pulling power for wagons, drays, coaches, cabs, vans, traps, gigs and carts of all dimensions. This gave rise to stable, blacksmith, farrier and saddlery businesses in the Papanui area. Hitching posts and water troughs were common place especially at 'watering holes' like the Papanui Hotel.

When Canterbury's first railways were built the Main North Line was opened through Papanui on 27 April 1872. The current Railway Station, though planned and designed in 1872 was not opened until 1900. In the 28 intervening years a 25x8 foot shed did 'Station' duty. A tram line was laid on Papanui Road in 1880 terminating at the Papanui Railway Station. The first Trams were steam and horse drawn until the introduction of electric trams on the Papanui line in 1905.

The Northcote extension to St Bede's College was opened on 28 February 1913 and closed on 30 September 1930. With the exception of the first few tram-cars, which were brought from the United States, the trams were made by a local firm, Boon & Co. The last tram to Papanui ran in 1954 with the trams being replaced by bright red buses run by the Christchurch Transport Board (later Red Bus Ltd.).

== Policing ==
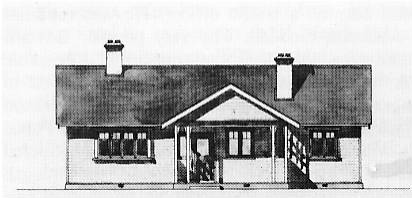
Papanui Police Station (1879)

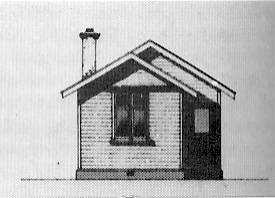
Police Watch House (1879)

As the city expanded a police station was built in Papanui in proximity to the railway line on the corner of Winstone Ave. It was opposite to the current railway station in Restell Street and was opened on 8 October 1879. The buildings erected were a watch house with two cells, and a six-room cottage at a cost of £824. The Papanui police area was huge at that time and went westward to Sheffield and Colgate. The first officer in charge was Constable Daniel Flanagan and he held the post for nearly seven years.
In 1949 the police operations were moved to 103 St James Avenue using the existing house on the section (dating from 1925) and the original watch house(1879). In 1959 a new police station and residence was opened on Papanui Road just south of the Blighs Road intersection. In 1979 the senior sergeant's residence was converted into offices with a CIB office being opened in the same year. Detective Sergeant Roy Powell was the first appointee. The first policewoman stationed at Papanui, in September 1978, was Constable Diane Smith.
For Papanui residents in the 1950s and 1960s the name 'Handlebar Harry' will bring back memories of a tall policeman on a push bike. Constable Ronald Miles was the local enquiry officer and had the habit of riding the streets of Papanui with his typewriter strapped to the handlebars of his cycle. However it was not the position of the typewriter that earned him the nickname, it was his wonderful 'Jimmy Edwards' style flowing moustache.
The current police station is opposite Langdons Road on the corner of the Main North Road and Mary Street and was opened on 30 October 1991.
As an interesting foot note the Watch House has survived the years and can now be seen amongst Lady Isaac's collection of heritage buildings at McArthurs Road, Harewood.

== Parks ==
St James Park was originally 'glebe land' belonging to St Paul's church and was divorced from the main church property by the laying of the Main North Railway line in the early 1870s. It is believed to have been farmed by James Triggs, the St Paul's Church verger, and part of it was developed as a cricket ground by the Papanui Cricket Club under the captaincy of John Matson with the permission of Rev. Lorenzo Moore. By 1874 the new incumbent at St Paul's, the Rev Brittan, had joined the Cricket Club as a player, but had also leased some of the land to Mr Jackson, another club member, for stock grazing. The land appears in an 1880 map as a cricket ground, but was later abandoned by the cricket club and sold to Ivorys Cool Stores in 1916. The land was purchased by the City in 1924 after residents, led by Rev Griffin, petitioned the council for a park and has both main entrances sited on St James Avenue. It was named in a Public Notice drawn up by the Christchurch City Council Bylaws and Finance committee chaired by Councilor Andrews on 30 April 1924. Rev Griffin did not live to see the park opened, and as a mark of respect Memorial Gates and a rose garden we jointly funded by the residents and the Council in his honour.

== Education ==
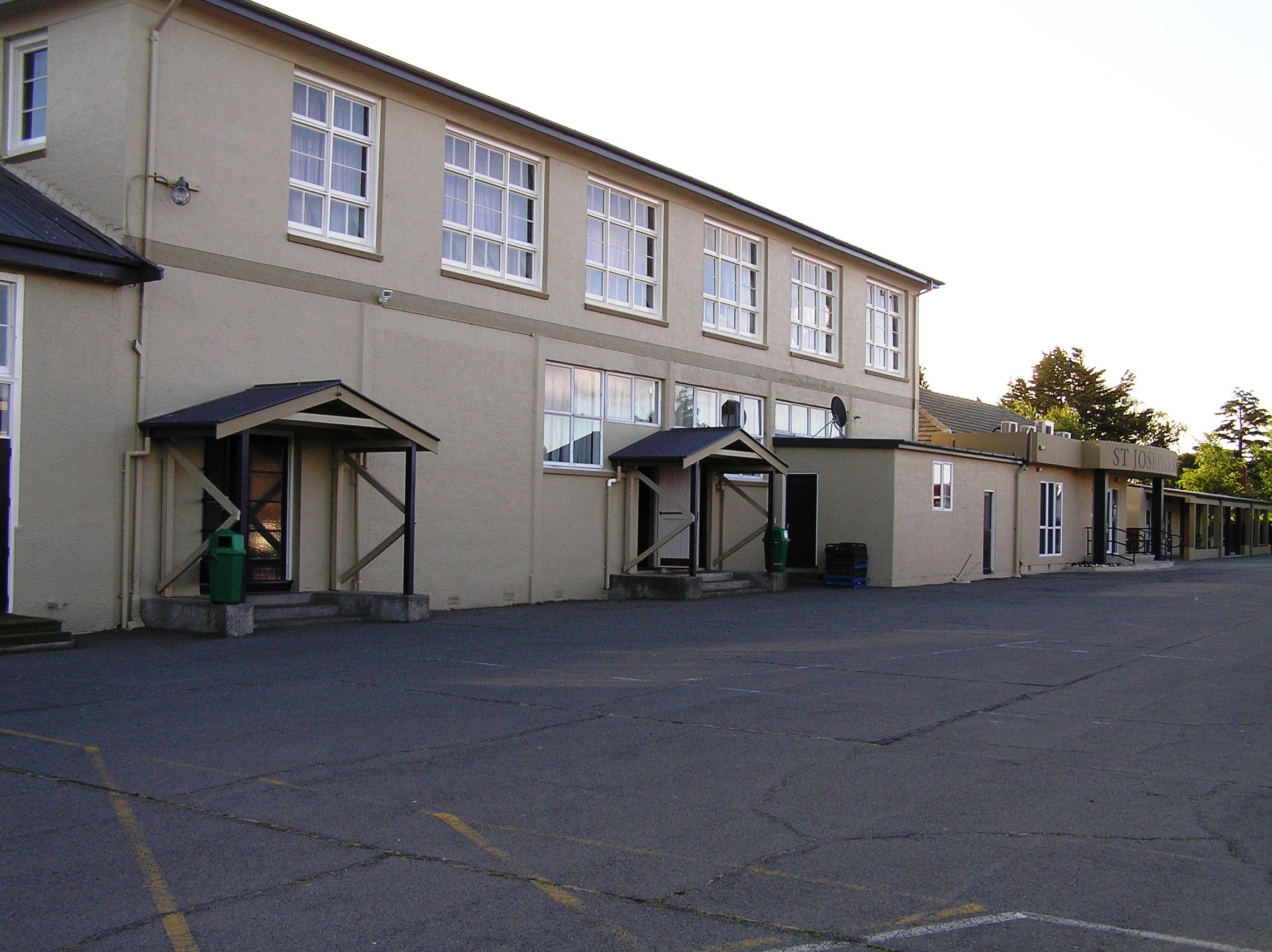
St Joseph's Primary School established 1878. (2008)

The main educational centre is Papanui High School, opened in 1936 as Papanui Technical College, and renamed in 1955, which is located adjacent to the rear of Northlands Shopping Centre on Langdons Road. It has a roll of 1,416 students.

The other high school in the area is St Bede's College, a Catholic state-integrated school which was established in 1911 on Ferry Road and relocated to its current site on the Main North Road in 1920 as a day and boarding school. It has 802 students.

Papanui Primary School was established in 1871 on Winters Road. The school was rebuilt further along Winters Road on 6 acres (24,000 m^{2}) of land in September 1926. It has 230 students. Paparoa Street Primary School opened in 1953. It has 332 students.

St Joseph's Primary School (Catholic) opened on Vagues Road in 1878. Christchurch Adventist School opened on Grants Road in 1925. They have rolls of 433 and 285 students, respectively. Loreto College (Catholic) opened on Windermere Road in 1930 but was closed in 1978.

All these schools except St Bede's and Loreto are coeducational. Rolls are as of July 2026.

== Temperatures ==
Climate data for Papanui
Month	Jan	Feb	Mar	Apr	May	Jun	Jul	Aug	Sep	Oct	Nov	Dec	Year
Mean daily maximum °C (°F)	22.5 (72.5)	22.2 (72.0)	20.4 (68.7)	17.8 (64.0)	14.6 (58.3)	11.7 (53.1)	11.3 (52.3)	12.4 (54.3)	14.9 (58.8)	17.4 (63.3)	19.2 (66.6)	21.2 (70.2)	17.1 (62.8)
Mean daily minimum °C (°F)	12.2 (54.0)	12.1 (53.8)	10.6 (51.1)	7.7 (45.9)	4.5 (40.1)	2.1 (35.8)	1.9 (35.4)	2.9 (37.2)	5.1 (41.2)	7.2 (45.0)	8.9 (48.0)	10.9 (51.6)	7.2 (45.0)
Average precipitation mm (inches)	42 (1.7)	39 (1.5)	54 (2.1)	54 (2.1)	56 (2.2)	66 (2.6)	79 (3.1)	69 (2.7)	47 (1.9)	53 (2.1)	44 (1.7)	49 (1.9)	648 (25.5)
Source: NIWA Science climate data
