= Strowan =

Suburb of Christchurch, New Zealand

- Suburb
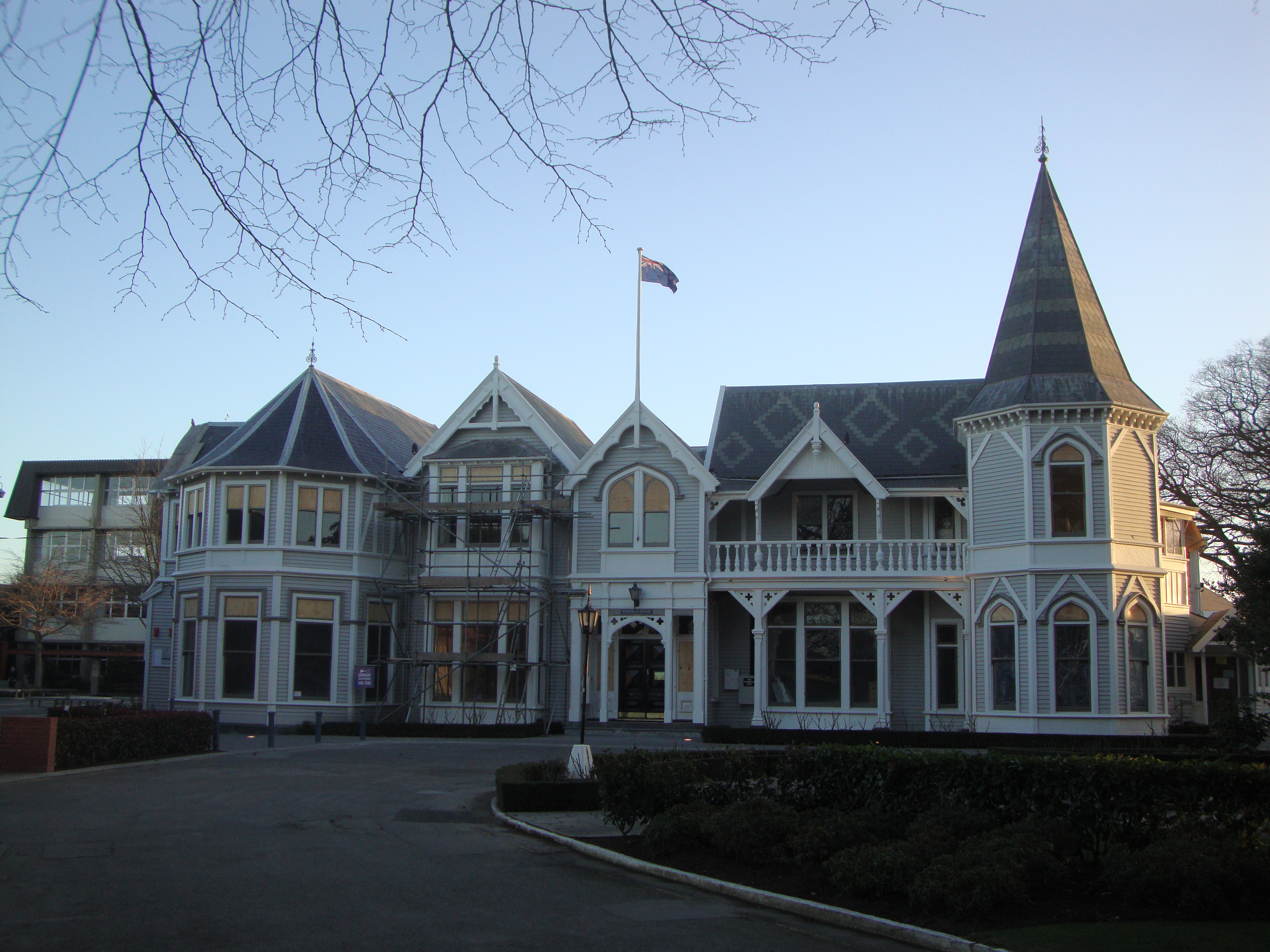
- Strowan House, the administration building of St. Andrew's College
- Interactive map of Strowan
- Coordinates: 43°30′30″S 172°36′35″E
- Country: New Zealand
- City: Christchurch
- Local authority: Christchurch City Council
- Electoral ward: Fendalton
- Community board: Waimāero Fendalton-Waimairi-Harewood

Area
  - Land: 144 ha (360 acres)

Population (June 2025)
  - Total: 3,620
  - Density: 2,510/km^{2} (6,510/sq mi)
- Hospitals: St George's

	Papanui
Bryndwr	Strowan	St Albans
Fendalton	Merivale

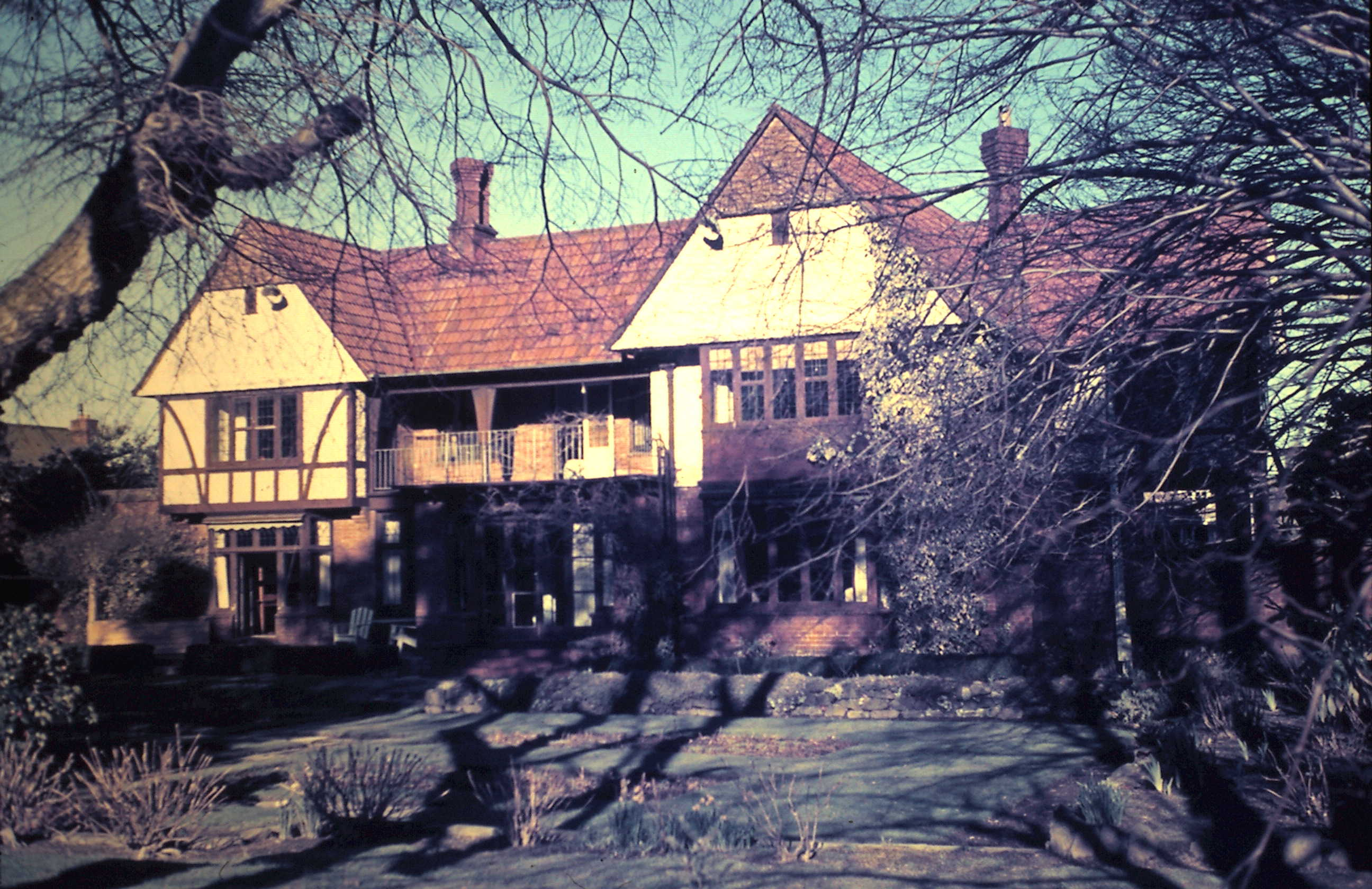
Elizabeth House, since demolished

Strowan is an inner city suburb of Christchurch, New Zealand, located approximately 5 km north-west of Christchurch's central business district. It had a population of 3,705 at the 2013 census. It is located between the suburbs of Merivale, Papanui, Bryndwr, Fendalton, and St Albans.

The area is predominantly residential, containing mostly parks and schools and few retail or commercial buildings. A small shopping centre exists at the intersection of Wairakei and Normans Roads, in the centre of the suburb. There is a private hospital located in the south-eastern corner of Strowan near the border of Merivale, called St. George's Hospital. The main train line north of Christchurch runs through the western part of the suburb - crossings exist on Blighs, Wairakei and Glandovey Roads.

Most of the suburb's housing is large and expensive, with a generally older architecture than many newer areas of Christchurch. There was little earthquake damage in Strowan after the 2011 Christchurch earthquake.

St George's Hospital, opened in 1928 and now one of New Zealand's largest private hospitals, is at 249 Papanui Road.

== Demographics ==
Strowan covers 1.44 km^{2} (0.56 sq mi). It had an estimated population of 3,620 as of June 2025, with a population density of 2,514 people per km^{2}.

Historical population
Year	Pop.	±% p.a.
2006	3,645	—
2013	3,399	−0.99%
2018	3,507	+0.63%
2023	3,558	+0.29%

Strowan had a population of 3,558 in the 2023 New Zealand census, an increase of 51 people (1.5%) since the 2018 census, and an increase of 159 people (4.7%) since the 2013 census. There were 1,743 males, 1,806 females, and 12 people of other genders in 1,278 dwellings. 3.0% of people identified as LGBTIQ+. The median age was 42.7 years (compared with 38.1 years nationally). There were 705 people (19.8%) aged under 15 years, 636 (17.9%) aged 15 to 29, 1,599 (44.9%) aged 30 to 64, and 621 (17.5%) aged 65 or older.

People could identify as more than one ethnicity. The results were 88.3% European (Pākehā); 7.0% Māori; 1.9% Pasifika; 8.3% Asian; 1.3% Middle Eastern, Latin American and African New Zealanders (MELAA); and 2.0% other, which includes people giving their ethnicity as "New Zealander". English was spoken by 97.8%, Māori by 1.8%, Samoan by 0.4%, and other languages by 11.2%. No language could be spoken by 1.3% (e.g. too young to talk). New Zealand Sign Language was known by 0.3%. The percentage of people born overseas was 21.8, compared with 28.8% nationally.

Religious affiliations were 34.7% Christian, 0.6% Hindu, 0.5% Islam, 0.1% Māori religious beliefs, 0.9% Buddhist, 0.1% New Age, 0.2% Jewish, and 0.8% other religions. People who answered that they had no religion were 57.6%, and 4.9% of people did not answer the census question.

Of those at least 15 years old, 1,152 (40.4%) people had a bachelor's or higher degree, 1,290 (45.2%) had a post-high school certificate or diploma, and 408 (14.3%) people exclusively held high school qualifications. The median income was $47,700, compared with $41,500 nationally. 645 people (22.6%) earned over $100,000 compared to 12.1% nationally. The employment status of those at least 15 was 1,404 (49.2%) full-time, 447 (15.7%) part-time, and 57 (2.0%) unemployed.

== Education ==
Waimairi School is a contributing primary school catering for years 1 to 6. It has a roll of 301. The school opened in 1914 as Blair's Road School and was renamed Waimairi School in 1920.

He Tīwai Mātauranga, Heaton Normal Intermediate School is an intermediate school catering for years 7 to 8. It has a roll of 531. Heaton was established as a boys' school in 1948, and became coeducational in 1953.

St Andrew's College is a private Presbyterian composite school catering for years 1 to 13. It has a roll of 1,636. It opened as a boys' school in 1917 and became coeducational in 1991.

All these schools are coeducational. Rolls are as of March 2026.
