= Bryndwr =

Suburb of Christchurch, New Zealand

- Suburb
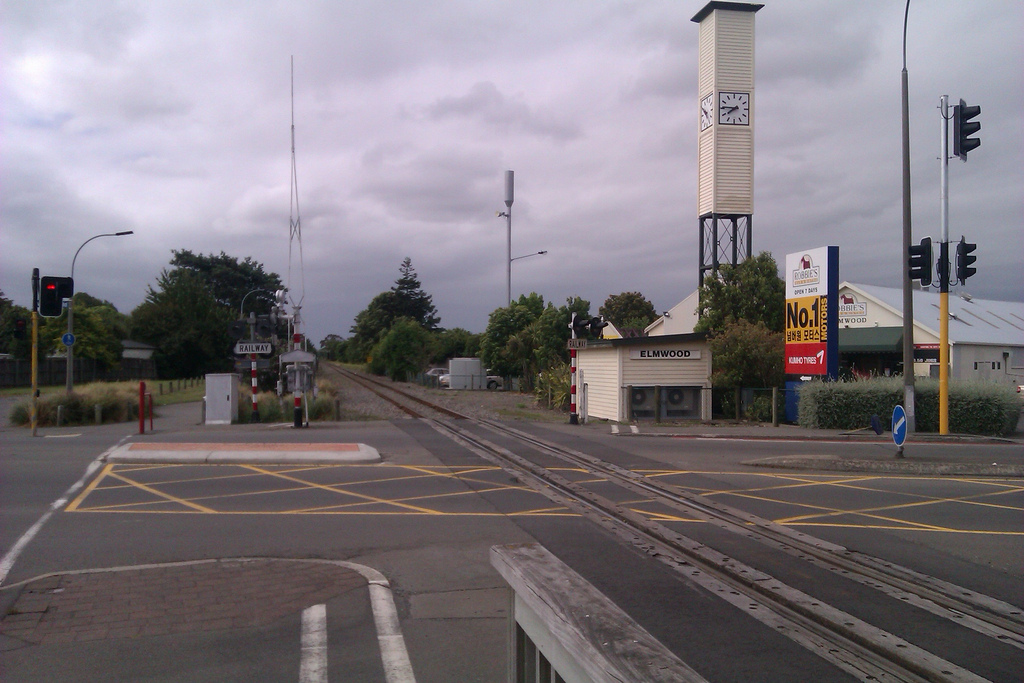
- The former Bryndwr railway station at Elmwood corner
- Interactive map of Bryndwr
- Coordinates: 43.5035°S 172.5940°E
- Country: New Zealand
- City: Christchurch
- Electoral ward: Fendalton; Papanui
- Community board: Waimāero Fendalton-Waimairi-Harewood; Waipapa Papanui-Innes-Central

Area
  - Land: 331 ha (820 acres)

Population (June 2025)
  - Total: 9,850
  - Density: 2,980/km^{2} (7,710/sq mi)

	Bishopdale	Papanui
Burnside	Bryndwr	Strowan
	Ilam	Fendalton

Bryndwr (/ˈbrɪndwər/ BRIND-wər; Welsh: [brənˈduːr]) is a suburb in the north-west of Christchurch, New Zealand.

== Development ==
Bryndwr, meaning 'hillside by water' (from Bryn "hillside" + dŵr "water"), and probably named for the slopes beside the Wairarapa and Waimairi streams which run through the suburb, is one of the few places in New Zealand with a name of Welsh origin. It was given this name by Charles Alured Jeffreys, (1821–1904) of Glandyfi, Cardiganshire, Wales. He farmed this area after being given 100 acres (40 ha) freehold by his father-in-law Thomas Parr in 1851, who was granted Rural Section 188 from the Canterbury Association. Jeffreys also took a further 100 acres (40 ha) leasehold. He and his wife Clara Ellen emigrated on the Tasmania arriving in Lyttelton in 1853.

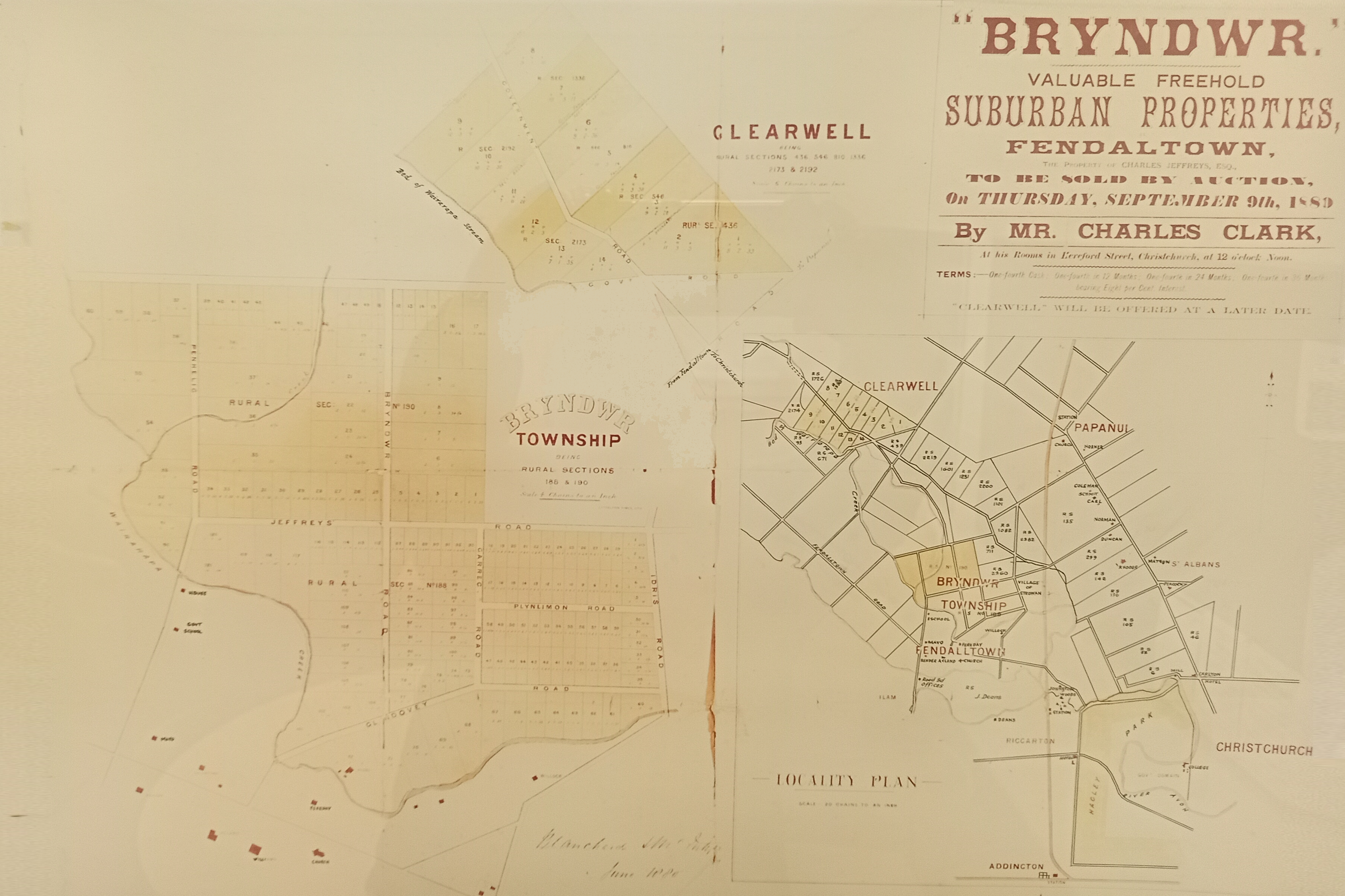
Photo of promotional document advertising sections for sale in the original Bryndwr subdivision in 1880.

His land, sections 503 and 504, was known as Bryndwr Farm, Fendall Town. Jeffreys subdivided the land, selling 180 lots at auction as the "valuable suburb of Bryndwr", in 1880. Many streets he named in the area have Welsh associations including Jeffreys, Plynlimon, Penhelig, Glandovey (Anglicised version of Glandyfi), Idris, (from Cadair Idris), Snowdon, Garreg, and Bryndwr Road. Jeffreys, his wife and daughter returned to Glandyfi castle after his elder brother, Edward, died in 1888.

A 1922 map of Christchurch shows "Bryndwr Station" railway station north of the intersection of Normans Road and Wairakei Road (then Wairarapa Road). The farm owned by William Warner of Warner's Hotel in the Norman's Road area of Bryndwr was subdivided, and the Normans Road shops included the Warner farmhouse. In about 1957, the Roper's Foodmarket in this group of shops was designed by local architect Paul Pascoe.

Land was further subdivided during the 1940s, 1950s and 1960s, and these streets were laid out in the sinuous nested form of the Radburn design. The subdivision included the land that was the Bateman farm, on Greers Road, and extended between what is now Memorial Avenue, and Wairakei Road, and north of Wairakei Road including around the Greer homestead built in 1878, at what is now 302 Greers Road, and land owned by Christ's College, Christchurch. Street names from this period of subdivision included notable politicians (Attlee, Truman, Evatt, Eden), Otago landmarks (Earnslaw, Hollyford, Hooker, Aorangi, Lyall, Sealy), names associated with Christ's College, (Blanch, Bourne, Condell, Hudson, Flower, Harris, Merton, Moreland, Richards, Tothill), and HMS Bounty, (Bounty, Resolution, Pitcairn, Christian). The houses along Wayside Avenue included exhibition homes.

== Demographics ==
Bryndwr, comprising the statistical areas of Bryndwr North, Bryndwr South and Jellie Park, covers 3.31 km^{2} (1.28 sq mi). It had an estimated population of 9,850 as of June 2025, with a population density of 2,976 people per km^{2}.

Historical population
Year	Pop.	±% p.a.
2006	9,000	—
2013	9,069	+0.11%
2018	9,288	+0.48%
2023	9,339	+0.11%

Bryndwr North had a population of 9,339 in the 2023 New Zealand census, an increase of 51 people (0.5%) since the 2018 census, and an increase of 270 people (3.0%) since the 2013 census. There were 4,572 males, 4,719 females, and 51 people of other genders in 3,432 dwellings. 4.2% of people identified as LGBTIQ+. There were 1,656 people (17.7%) aged under 15 years, 2,097 (22.5%) aged 15 to 29, 4,002 (42.9%) aged 30 to 64, and 1,581 (16.9%) aged 65 or older.

People could identify as more than one ethnicity. The results were 71.2% European (Pākehā); 10.8% Māori; 4.0% Pasifika; 21.7% Asian; 2.5% Middle Eastern, Latin American and African New Zealanders (MELAA); and 2.2% other, which includes people giving their ethnicity as "New Zealander". English was spoken by 95.0%, Māori by 2.3%, Samoan by 1.0%, and other languages by 22.0%. No language could be spoken by 1.6% (e.g. too young to talk). New Zealand Sign Language was known by 0.6%. The percentage of people born overseas was 31.2, compared with 28.8% nationally.

Religious affiliations were 32.8% Christian, 1.4% Hindu, 1.5% Islam, 0.5% Māori religious beliefs, 1.4% Buddhist, 0.3% New Age, 0.2% Jewish, and 1.8% other religions. People who answered that they had no religion were 54.2%, and 6.1% of people did not answer the census question.

Of those at least 15 years old, 2,571 (33.5%) people had a bachelor's or higher degree, 3,480 (45.3%) had a post-high school certificate or diploma, and 1,623 (21.1%) people exclusively held high school qualifications. 996 people (13.0%) earned over $100,000 compared to 12.1% nationally. The employment status of those at least 15 was 3,501 (45.6%) full-time, 1,215 (15.8%) part-time, and 222 (2.9%) unemployed.

Individual statistical areas
Name	Area (km^{2})	Population	Density (per km^{2})	Dwellings	Median age	Median income
Bryndwr North	1.09	3,342	3,066	1,206	34.2 years	$37,800
Bryndwr South	0.91	2,886	3,171	1,125	42.5 years	$33,900
Jellie Park	1.31	3,111	2,375	1,101	39.7 years	$40,700
New Zealand					38.1 years	$41,500

== Facilities ==
As an older suburb, Bryndwr has well established cultural, sporting and commercial facilities, including a Council Service Centre, several schools and parks, and two supermarkets.

=== Shopping areas ===
- "Elmwood Village" at the intersection of Norman's Road and Wairakei Road, (which in 1938 included the Bryndwr Bakery and the Bryndwr Butchery)
- "Fendalton Village" at the intersection of Ilam Road and Clyde Road,
- shops at the intersection of Wairakei Road and Aorangi Road,
- the Wairakei Road shopping centre, at the intersection of Greers Road and Wairakei Road,
- shops at the intersection of Harris Crescent and Blanch Street.

=== Community ===
- The Christchurch City Council Fendalton Service Centre and Public Library are at the intersection of Jeffreys Road and Clyde Road.

=== Parks, sports and recreation ===
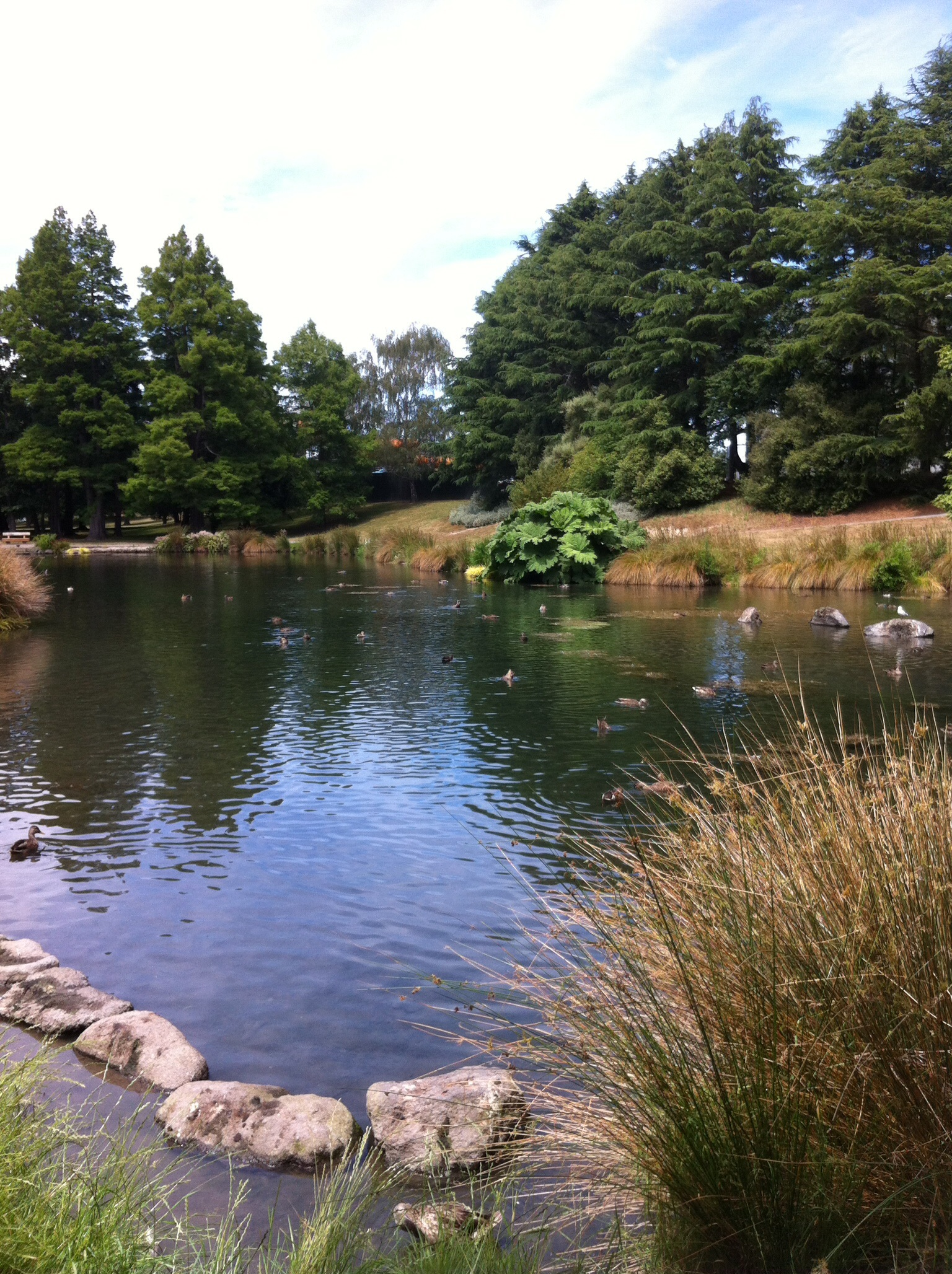
An artificial lake in Jellie Park

- 26 acres (11 ha) of land for Jellie Park, in the Bryndwr/Burnside area, were donated in 1960 to the Waimairi County Council by James Jellie. The park, now 12 ha in area, has a large pond, sports fields, a skate park, and a swimming and gym complex, and a High Performance Sports Centre within a setting of lawn and large trees.
- Edgar MacIntosh Park has sports fields, a playground, and an open-air paddling pool.
- Derwent Reserve on Derwent Street is a local reserve with playground equipment.
- Morley Reserve on the corner of Morley Street and Clyde Road is a local reserve with playground equipment, a Community Garden and a hall.
- Pitcairn Playground on Pitcairn Crescent is a local reserve with playground equipment.
- Jeffreys Reserve on Jeffreys Road has sports fields, playground equipment and tennis courts.
- Otara Reserve on Clyde Road is a small reserve that provides a pedestrian connection between Otara Street and Clyde Road.
- Plynlimon Park on Plynlimon Street has sports fields and playground equipment.

=== Schools ===
Wairakei School is located on Wairakei Road in Bryndwr, and teaches children from Year 1 to Year 6. It has 202 students. The school opened in 1950.

Allenvale School at 14A Aorangi Road teaches children from throughout Christchurch from Years 1–13 for those with specialist needs requiring Ongoing Resourcing under the Ongoing Resourcing Scheme (ORS). It has 135 students.

St Patrick's School at 57 Plynlimon Road is a Catholic state-integrated school for Years 1–8. It has 171 students. It opened in 1951.

Aorangi School, a primary school that was closed by the government in early 2010, was located in Bryndwr.

All these schools are coeducational. Rolls are as of July 2026.

=== Elderly housing and care ===
There are several privately owned rental developments in Bryndwr available to residents 60 years old and over, as well as:

- Aorangi Courts, 110 Aorangi Road, has Council owned rentable retirement housing
- Jennifer Street, 21 Jennifer Street, has Council owned rentable retirement housing
- Manor Place, 22a Manor Place, has Council owned rentable retirement housing
- Torquay Place, 28 & 29 Torquay Place, has Council owned rentable retirement housing
- Resolution Courts, 5 Resolution Place, has Council owned rentable retirement housing
- Elmswood Retirement Village, 131 Wairakei Road, has Rest home care and purchasable residential units
- Fendalton Retirement Village, 73 Bryndwr Road, has Rest home care and purchasable residential units
- Radius Hawthorne, 10 St Winifreds Place, has hospital residential care, and specialist hospital and dementia residential care

=== Churches ===
- Bryndwr Baptist Church, 309 Clyde Road
- Bryndwr Chapel, 179 Idris Road
- Christchurch Chinese Church, 286 Greers Road
- Christ the King Catholic Church, 90 Greers Road
- Elim Church, 193 Grahams Road
- Saint Aidan's Anglican Church, 63 Brookside Terrace
- St John's Methodist Church, at 49 Bryndwr Road, built in 1927, was most recently used by the Moraia Fijian Congregation, as part of the Christchurch North Methodist Parish, but has been closed because of damage in the 2011 Christchurch earthquake.
- Saint Matthew's Catholic Church, 108 Jeffreys Road, which features a maquette "Angel of St Matthew" (1967) by Ria Bancroft
- Saint Stephen's Presbyterian Church, 365A Ilam Road
- Saint Thomas's Anglican Church, 17 Strowan Road

=== Waterways ===
Waterways that begin in or pass through the suburb are tributaries to the Avon River. They include:

- Dudley Creek which begins in the suburb of Bishopdale, crosses Greers Road and parallels Condell Avenue while meandering toward the suburb of Papanui
- Wai iti Stream which begins near Sealy Place, parallels Brookside Terrace and Wai iti Terrace, crossing Clyde Road to join the Wairarapa Stream
- Hewlings Stream which passes through the Burnside High School grounds, crosses Greers Road to Jellie Park where it swells to become the lake, then joins Wairarapa Stream
- Jellie Park artesian bore that spills through a water feature into Jellie Park Lake
- Jellie Park Lake fed by the bore and Hewlings Stream
- Wairarapa Stream which runs from the west side of Grahams Road, paralleling Wayside Avenue and crossing Greers Road to parallel Truman Road beside the north side of Jellie Park then crosses and briefly parallels Ilam Road, runs alongside the Cobham Intermediate School grounds, crosses Clyde Road, runs to the Waiwetu reserve then turns to cross Glandovey Road then Idris Road.

== Notable residents ==
- C. E. Beeby ONZ CMG, educationalist, lived at 15 Wairarapa Tce.
- Wing Commander Johnny Checketts, RNZAF
- John Key, Prime Minister of New Zealand (2008–2016), grew up in a state house on Hollyford Avenue in Bryndwr.
