= George Dickinson (Canterbury cricketer) =

New Zealand cricketer (1828–1913)

Personal information
- Born: 1828; Sheffield, Yorkshire, England
- Died: 14 June 1913 (aged 84–85); St Albans, Christchurch, New Zealand
- Bowling: Round-arm slow

Domestic team information
- Years: Team
- 1863-64 to 1873-74: Canterbury

Career statistics
Competition	First-class
Matches	9
Runs scored	88
Batting average	6.28
100s/50s	0/0
Top score	30
Balls bowled	658
Wickets	20
Bowling average	12.80
5 wickets in innings	0
10 wickets in match	0
Best bowling	4/43
Catches/stumpings	6/0
- Source: Cricinfo, 5 September 2020

George Dickinson (1828 – 14 June 1913) was a New Zealand cricketer who played first-class cricket for Canterbury from 1864 to 1874. He was later a first-class umpire.

== Cricket career ==
Born in Yorkshire, Dickinson played in the first recorded cricket match in Christchurch in December 1851, when he was 23. The match took place in Hagley Park, between a Working Men's Eleven (Dickinson's team) and a Christchurch Cricket Club Eleven, as part of the celebrations marking a year since the foundation of Christchurch. Dickinson was one of the most successful batsmen and bowlers in the match. He appeared in a similar celebratory match 20 years later, this time for Old Chums against New Chums, and once again succeeded with both bat and ball.

An accurate slow round-arm bowler, able to break the ball either way off the pitch, Dickinson played in the first seven first-class matches in New Zealand, representing Canterbury in their annual match against Otago beginning with the inaugural match in January 1864. His best figures against Otago included 3 for 7 in 1864 and 3 for 17 in 1867, but his most successful match was in 1869, when he scored 30 in the first innings, took 4 for 43, then made 8 not out in the second innings to help Canterbury avert defeat.

Dickinson umpired four first-class matches in New Zealand between 1873 and 1885. He built his own cricket practice pavilion in Christchurch, enabling cricketers to practice indoors during winter and in wet weather.

== Personal life ==
Dickinson was one of the first settlers in St Albans, which is now a northern suburb of Christchurch, where he had a farm to the south of the St Albans Creek. He called his farm St Albans in memory of his cousin Harriet Mellon, an actress, who had become the Duchess of St Albans in England. When residents were looking for a name for the district, he suggested St Albans, and it was adopted. He served on the St Albans borough council for 14 years.

Dickinson's first wife, Marianne, died in April 1884. His second wife, Janet, died in March 1895. He died suddenly at his home in Westminster Street, St Albans, on 14 June 1913, aged 85. He was survived by his third wife, Jessie.
