= Timeline of the Canterbury earthquakes =

Series of earthquakes in New Zealand

The Canterbury earthquakes in New Zealand started with a moment magnitude 7.1 earthquake on 4 September 2010 at 4:35 am with an epicentre near Darfield. It caused widespread damage and was followed by several aftershocks, including a magnitude 4.7 earthquake on Boxing Day 2010, and a magnitude 6.2 earthquake on 22 February 2011. The February earthquake had a much closer epicentre to the Christchurch city centre and was the most destructive and deadly earthquake of the entire sequence, causing 185 fatalities. Major events following this include a M6.0 earthquake in June 2011, a few earthquakes in December 2011 and a magnitude 5.7 earthquake in February 2016. The unrelated 2016 M_{w} 7.8 Kaikōura earthquake occurred in November and caused further damage to Canterbury, but is not included in this timeline as it is not a part of the sequence.

== 2010 ==
=== September ===
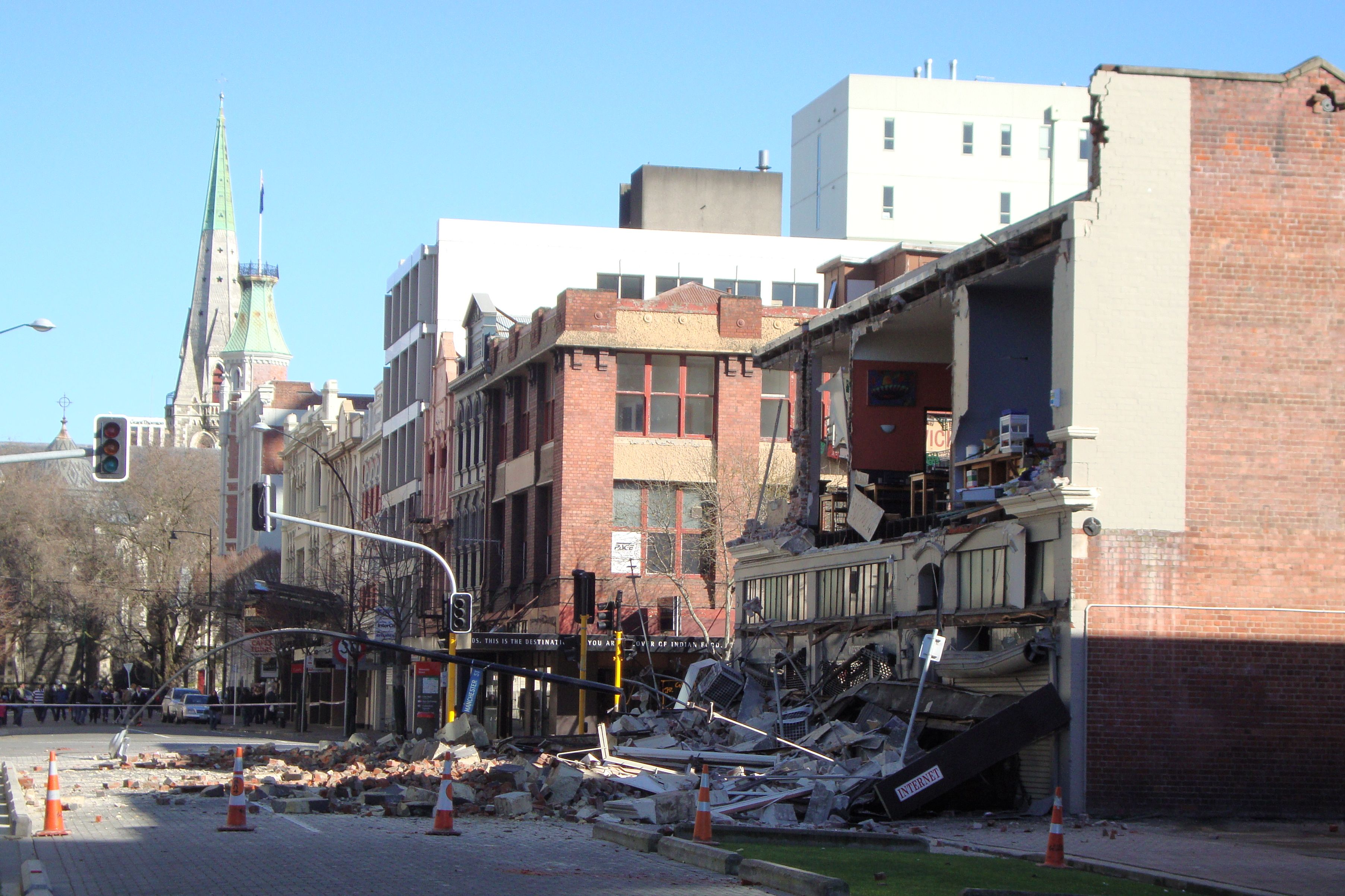
Building damage in Worcester Street, corner Manchester Street, with Christ Church Cathedral in the background

- 4 September
  - 4:35 am – The magnitude 7.1 2010 Canterbury earthquake strikes with an epicentre near Darfield.
  - 4:37 am – A magnitude 5.8 aftershock occurs.
  - 4:37 am – A magnitude 5.1 aftershock occurs.
  - 4:38 am – A magnitude 5.4 aftershock occurs.
  - 4:38 am – A magnitude 5.2 aftershock occurs.
  - 4:39 am – A magnitude 5.3 aftershock occurs.
  - 4:43 am – A magnitude 5.1 aftershock occurs.
  - 4:44 am – A magnitude 5.4 aftershock occurs.
  - 4:52 am – A magnitude 5.5 aftershock occurs.
  - 4:59 am – A magnitude 5.5 aftershock occurs.
  - 5:18 am – A magnitude 5.0 aftershock occurs.
  - 7 am – The National Crisis Management Centre under the Beehive is activated.
  - 8:30 am – Power is restored to Kaiapoi and Shirley.
  - 10 am – A state of emergency is declared in Canterbury.
  - 10:30 am – St John has received a total of 687 calls.
  - 1:30 pm – Christchurch Airport reopens.
  - 3 pm – A portable repeater station is placed on the Port Hills to provide VHF communications due to unreliable electrical and phone lines.
  - 3:30 pm – 70% of Christchurch gains power again.
  - 4 pm – Residents of Christchurch Central City are told to be evacuated.
  - 6 pm – Residents of Selwyn, especially those in Rolleston, are asked to conserve water after the supply got contaminated.
  - 7 pm – Contact Energy says that gas is safe to be used.
  - 7:00 pm – A curfew is enacted and lasts until 7:00 am the following day.
  - 7:30 pm – Power is restored to 90% of urban Christchurch.
- 5 September
  - 8:30 am – 85% of Christchurch has water supply.
  - 10 am – Christchurch pay phones become free for local, national and international calls.
  - 11 am – KiwiRail finishes transporting 280,000 litres of water from Temuka to Ashburton.
  - 11 am – The council starts inspecting buildings within the cordon.
- 6 September
  - The government gives $5 million to what became the Red Cross Canterbury Earthquake Commission Fund.
  - 11:40 pm – A magnitude 5.0 aftershock occurs.
- 7 September
  - Two families are reported to have contracted gastroenteritis. It is not immediately clear whether or not these were caused by a contaminated water supply.
  - Queen Elizabeth II sends a message to the prime minister, which asks to send her good wishes to those affected by the earthquake and those helping with the recovery.
  - Gerry Brownlee is made the Minister for Canterbury Earthquake Recovery.
  - The government allocates $15 million to a new wage support subsidy announced on this date, to help businesses in Canterbury with less than 20 employees.
- 8 September
  - 7:49 am – A magnitude 4.7 aftershock occurs. Measured peak ground accelerations range from 13%g to 25%g.
  - The Minister of Social Development pledges $2.5 million for giving earthquake victims counselling.
  - The Christchurch water boil notice is lifted after over 500 tests return negative.
- 9 September
  - Applications for wage subsidies open for people who lost work due to the earthquake.
  - Allan Baird is appointed Rural Emergency Coordinator for the Canterbury area to assist with the recovery of rural farm properties.
- 13 September

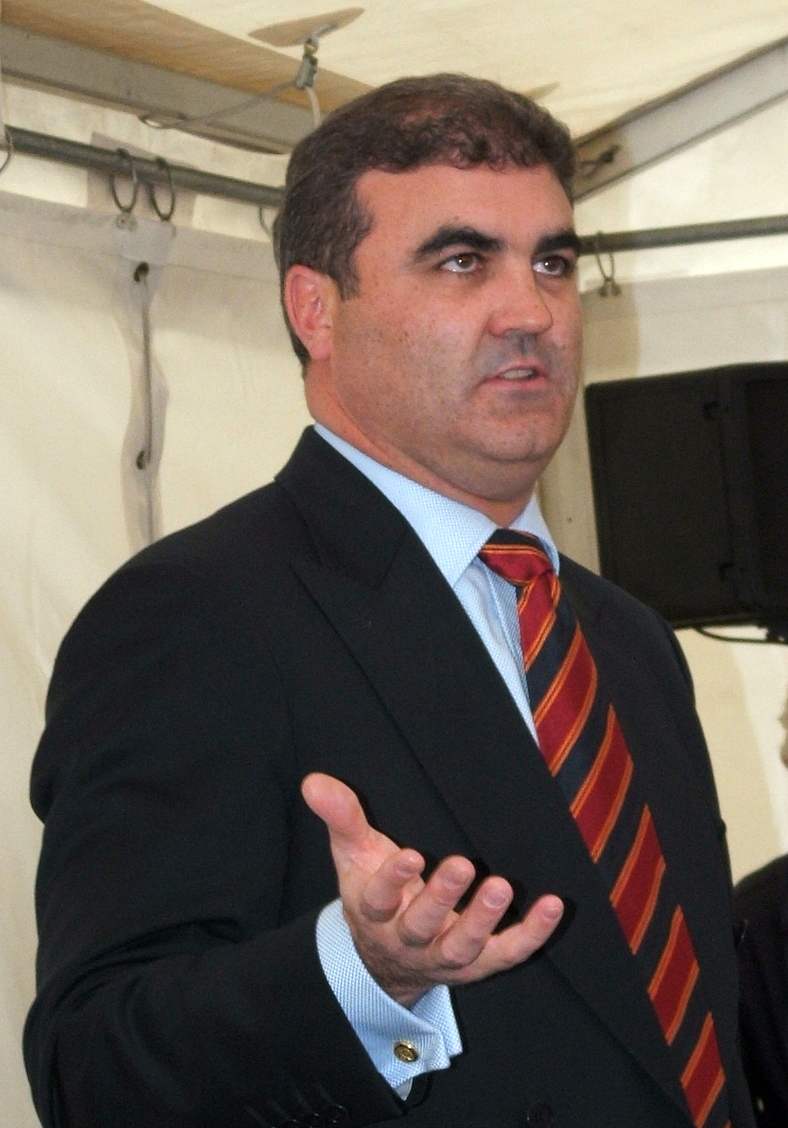
Hon Clayton Cosgrove in 2006

  - Hon Clayton Cosgrove is appointed as the Labour Party spokesperson for Canterbury Earthquake Recovery.
  - Most schools in Canterbury reopen. The others stay closed due to earthquake damage.
  - E. coli is detected in the Kaiapoi water supply.
  - 10 Salvation Army trauma counsellors arrive from Australia.
- 14 September – The Canterbury Earthquake Response and Recovery Act 2010 receives royal assent.
- 15 September
  - The Minister of Energy and Resources announces a programme which gives free heaters to those who lost their fireplaces or logburners in the earthquake.
- 16 September
  - The Canterbury state of emergency is lifted.
  - Seven new orders and regulations come into force.
- 17 September – The government pledges $10 million for the restoration of heritage buildings.
- 20 September – Cabinet approves the delay of three welfare reforms until 1 March 2011.
- 21 September – Police charge a demolition digger driver for an alleged attack on an engineer on 15 September after being asked to stop working.
- 23 September – The Canterbury Earthquake (Historic Places Act) Order 2010 takes into effect.
- 24 September – The members of the Canterbury Earthquake Recovery Commission are announced by the Hon Gerry Brownlee.
- 27 September – The Canterbury Earthquake (Social Security Act) Order 2010 takes into effect.

=== October ===
- October – The Earthquake Commission publishes the stage 1 Darfield Earthquake 4 September 2010 Geotechnical Land Damage Assessment & Reinstatement Report.
- 4 October
  - By this date, GeoNet has recorded a total of 1,400 aftershocks in Canterbury.
  - The wage support subsidy for small businesses is extended by four weeks.
  - A regulation and order takes into effect. These are the Canterbury Earthquake (Local Government Official Information and Meetings Act) Order 2010 and the Earthquake Commission Amendment Regulations 2010.
- 19 October
  - 11:32 am – A magnitude 4.8 aftershock occurs. Measured peak ground accelerations range from 7%g to 17%g.
  - Demolition begins on Manchester Courts.
- 23 October – The benefit concert Band Together is held.

=== November ===
- 14 November – A magnitude 4.7 earthquake occurs at 1:34 am. Initially there were no reports of damage, but damage claims rose to 1,996 by 14 January.
- 30 November – The Earthquake Commission publishes the stage 2 Geotechnical land damage assessment and reinstatement report.

=== December ===
- 6 December – The Earthquake Commission's claim deadline has been reached. It has received a total of 160,641 claims, and has paid out $450 million for 60,686 claims.
- 26 December
  - 10:30 am – A shallow local magnitude 4.9 aftershock occurs. Known as the Boxing Day earthquake, it is followed by a swarm of shallow and strong aftershocks, and causes further building damage, power outages, and water supply issues. Measured peak ground accelerations range from 22%g to 35%g.
  - Noon – Power is restored to the approximate 40,000 properties that lost power.
- 28 December – The restaurant of Trinity Congregational Church reopens.

== 2011 ==
=== January ===
- 6 January – By this date, the Earthquake Commission has received 165,203 claims for the 4 September, 19 October, 14 November and Boxing Day earthquakes.
- 14 January – It is reported that the Earthquake Commission has received 6895 claims for the Boxing Day earthquake.
- 19 January – Damage claims for the 19 October aftershock are due.
- 20 January – A magnitude 4.8 aftershock occurs at 6:03 am.
- Late January – Demolition of Manchester Courts is finished.

=== February ===
- 12 February – A re-run of Boxing Day sales is held in Christchurch to compensate for lost revenue caused by the Boxing Day aftershock.
- 14 February
  - Ken Ring tweets an earthquake prediction for 18 February, plus and minus three days. This gathers media attention after the earthquake on 22 February occurred.
  - Damage claims for the 14 November aftershock are due.
- 17 February
  - By this date, the Earthquake Commission has received 181,107 claims.
  - The government's Temporary Accommodation Allowance is made available.
- 18 February – By this date, the Earthquake Commission has paid out $740 million.
- 21 February – Four Canterbury Earthquake Temporary Accommodation Service offices open, in Christchurch, Linwood, Papanui, and Kaiapoi.
- 22 February

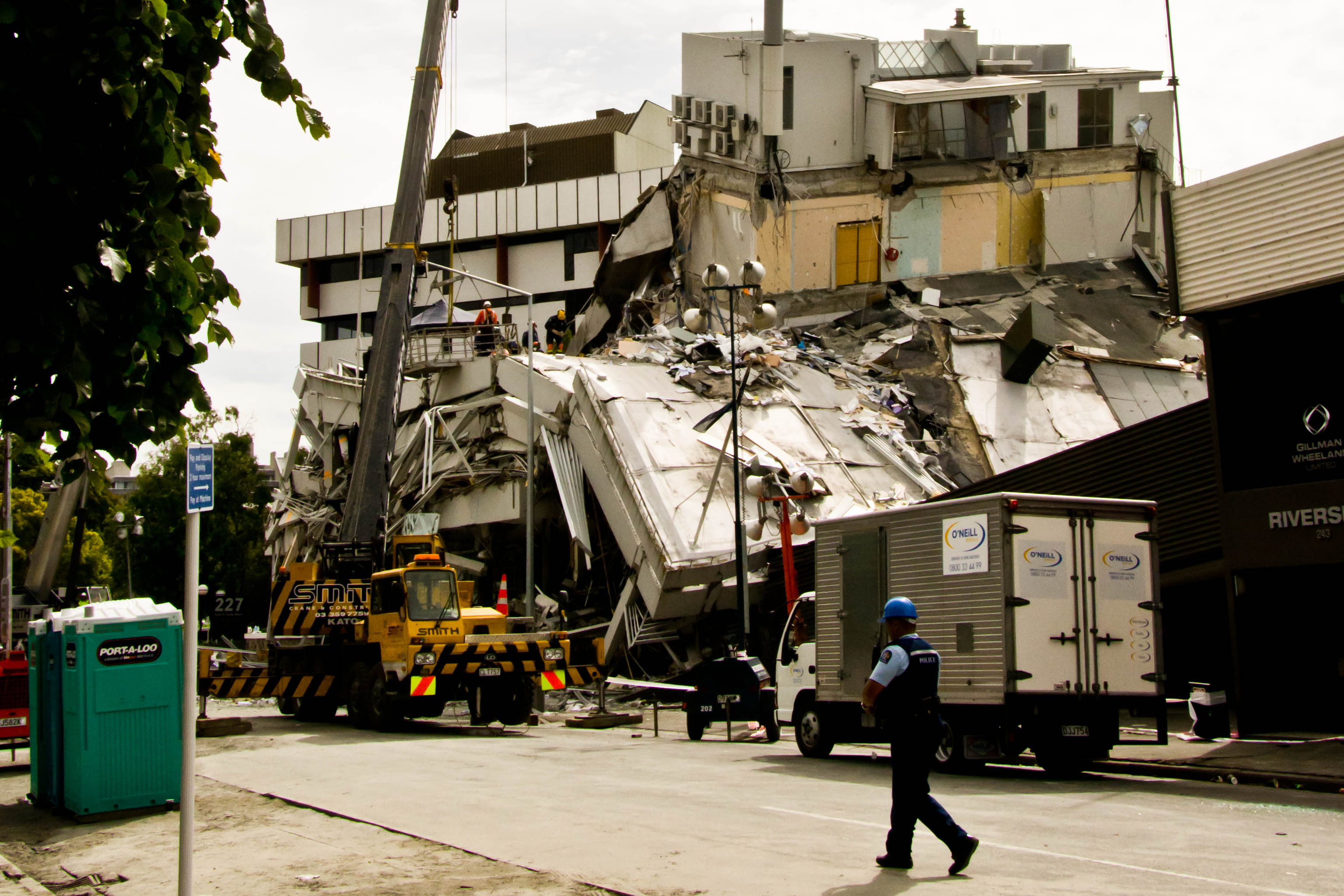
The collapsed PGC House

  - 12:51pm – A magnitude 6.2 earthquake strikes, which results in 185 deaths.
  - The CTV Building collapses.
  - The National Crisis Management Centre is activated.
  - 1:04 pm – A magnitude 5.5 aftershock occurs.
  - A state of emergency is declared in Christchurch.
  - 2:50 pm – A magnitude 5.6 aftershock occurs.
  - Queen Elizabeth II sends Prime Minister John Key a letter which includes "Please convey my deep sympathy to the families and friends of those who have been killed".
  - It is announced that Christchurch's twin town Christchurch, Dorset, will create four books of condolences.
- 23 February
  - 5:30 am – Civil Defence holds a press conference in the National Crisis Management Centre.
  - 10:30 am – The state of emergency is upgraded to a national level.
  - 1:30 pm – Search and rescue at the CTV Building stops after it was realised that the Grand Chancellor Hotel had safety issues. Work continued at the CTV site in the evening, but this was recovery work as it was decided that there was a low chance of there being any remaining survivors.
  - ~2 pm – A woman is rescued from the PGC Building, and becomes the last person to be rescued in Christchurch.
- 24 February
  - c. 24 February – Sydenham Heritage Church is demolished without proper consent.
  - A Taiwanese rescue team of 22 arrives.
  - A welfare centre is opened in Rolleston Community Centre with a capacity of 150 people.
  - Water is being delivered by 34 tankers in Christchurch.
  - Two water vats holding 4,500 litres of water are delivered to Christchurch.
  - A 75-bed Australian Army Field hospital arrives.
  - 8 am – Power has been restored to 60% of Christchurch.
  - 12 pm – Auckland Council announces the donation of $1.5 million to earthquake relief.
  - 3 pm – It is announced that the government will give $20,000 to the Student Volunteer Army.
- 25 February

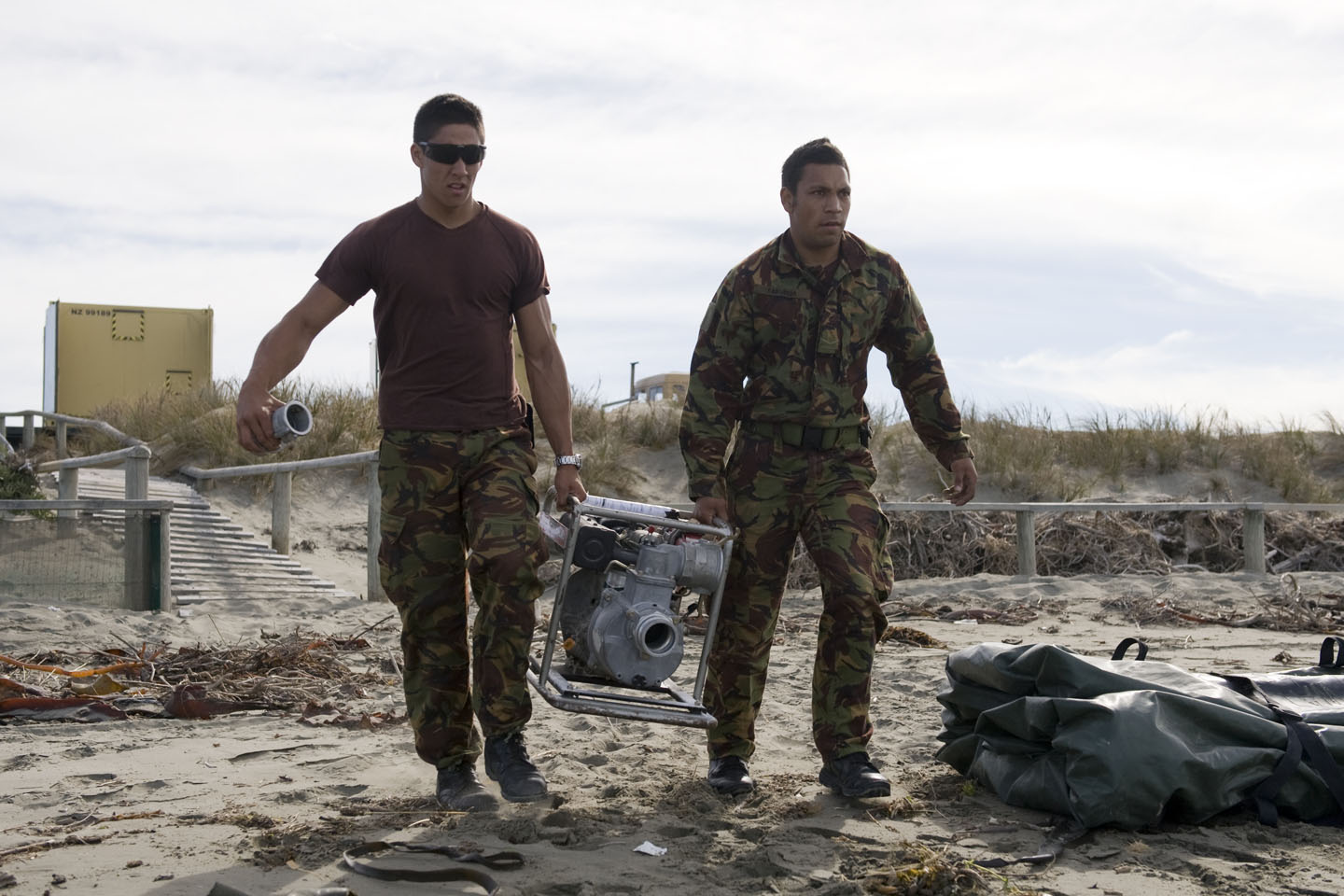
Army engineers setting up a desalination system

  - 6 am – Power has been restored to 75% of Christchurch, and mains water is able to be accessed by 50% of the city.
  - 7 am – Desalination plants in Lyttelton and New Brighton start up, which process 5,000 litres of water per hour.
  - 10:36 am – Telecom says that phone lines have been restored. It wants the public to text rather than call.
  - 10:55 am – The death toll rises to 113.
  - 10:00 am – The national census on 8 March is cancelled.
  - 12:25 pm – Prince Philip signs the book of condolences in London.
  - 2:45 pm – By this time, 780 portaloos have been distributed around the city, and 1200 are to arrive from overseas.
  - 5:30 pm – Prince Charles signs the book of condolences in London.
  - Over 300 Australian police officers are sworn in to help with recovery efforts. Teams from China, the United Kingdom and the United States also arrive.
  - Prince William and Kate Middleton sign the condolences book in London.
  - The Samoan government donates $100,000 to recovery efforts.
- 26 December – TelstraClear makes international and national phone calls free for Christchurch residents, which will last two weeks.
- 27 February
  - HMNZS Canterbury sails from Lyttelton to Wellington to pick up supplies.
  - 3 pm – Lyttelton tunnel reopens.
  - 10 pm – A pigeon is rescued from the rubble of Christ Church Cathedral and is named Barney Rubble.
- 28 February – Prime Minister John Key confirms that there will be an inquiry into the collapse of Christchurch's buildings.

=== March ===
- 1 March
  - Two minutes of silence are held nationwide at 12:51 pm, which marks one week since the February earthquake.
  - Fiji Prime Minister Voreqe Bainimarama signs the book of condolences at the New Zealand High Commission.
- 2 March – There are 1796 uniformed personnel around Christchurch, which is its peak.
- 3 March – Avonside and Dallington get 86 more portaloos.
- 4 March
  - By this date, 56,000 buildings have been inspected. Half of the listed heritage buildings have been marked unsafe.
  - Eastern suburbs get 120 more portaloos.
  - The Australian Army Field Hospital stops providing free primary care.
- 7 March – Elective surgery resumes in Christchurch Hospital.
- 10 March – The Reserve Bank drops the official cash rate from 3% to 2.5%, partly in response to the earthquake.
- 11 March – The magnitude 9.0 2011 Tōhoku earthquake and tsunami occurs off Japan, which causes the Japanese search and rescue teams to return for their country.
- 14 March
  - The Canterbury Earthquake Commemoration Day Act 2011 receives royal assent, which creates a public holiday in parts of Canterbury on 18 March.
  - The Royal Commission of Inquiry into Building Failure caused by Canterbury Earthquakes is announced.
  - The University of Canterbury partially opens, with lectures being held outside in marquees.
- 16 March – The last of the Singapore Armed Forces leaves Christchurch.
- 18 March
  - Some parts of Canterbury observe a commemoration day as a public holiday.
  - A national memorial service is held in Hagley Park which is attended by thousands, including Prince William.
- 19 March – Some residents flee the city in response to Ken Ring's prediction that there will be another big earthquake on 20 March.
- 21 March – About 100 CBD businessowners protest at the Christchurch Art Gallery (the temporary headquarters of Civil Defence) and within the cordon about a lack of communication from Civil Defence, and not being able to access business properties.
- 22 March – The government issues a press release stating "Business owners need to exercise patience and consider their need to access their businesses, bearing in mind that in doing so without authorisation they may not only endanger their own lives, but also the lives of others."
- 24 March – The creation of the Canterbury Earthquake Recovery Authority (CERA) is announced.
- 28 March – Damage claims for the Boxing Day earthquake are due.
- 29 March – The Canterbury Earthquake Recovery Authority is established, and recovery work is transferred from Civil Defence to CERA.

=== April ===
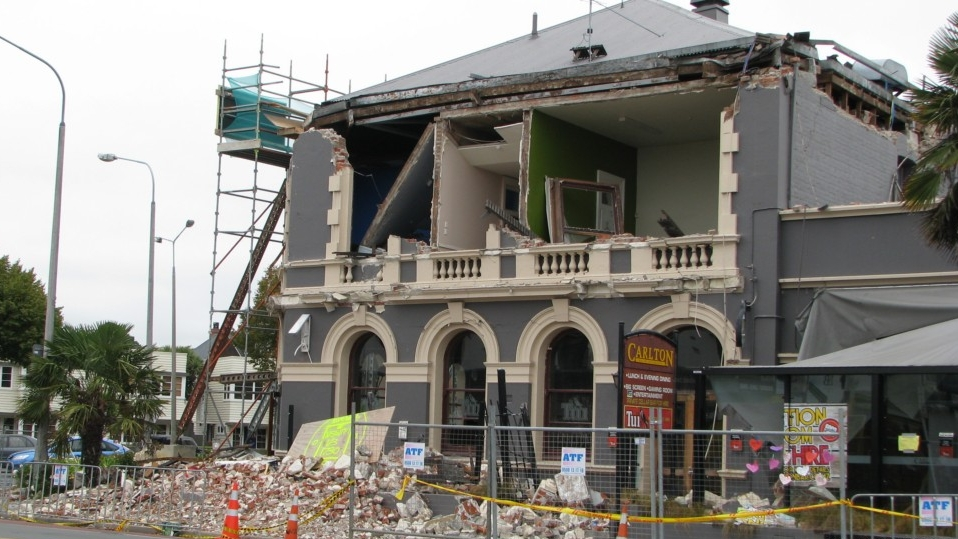
Damage of Calton Hotel after the February earthquake

- 9 April – The Carlton Hotel is urgently demolished.
- 11 April – The Burwood Hospital Birthing Unit reopens.
- 12 April – Three time capsules previously found in earthquake ruins are opened. One came from The Civic, and two came from under the Statue of John Robert Godley.
- 14 April
  - The Royal Commission of Inquiry into Building Failure caused by Canterbury Earthquakes is gazetted.
  - It is announced that the GDP figures for the quarter will be delayed by up to two weeks due to the February earthquake.
- 16 April
  - A magnitude 5.0 aftershock occurs at 5:49 pm. It causes 20,000 homes to lose power, and the eastern suburbs to experience liquefaction and flooding.
  - The last report on the Christchurch Recovery Map is made.
- 18 April – The Canterbury Earthquake Recovery Act 2011 receives royal assent. The Canterbury Earthquake Response and Recovery Act 2010 is repealed.
- 30 April – The nationwide state of emergency is lifted.

=== May ===
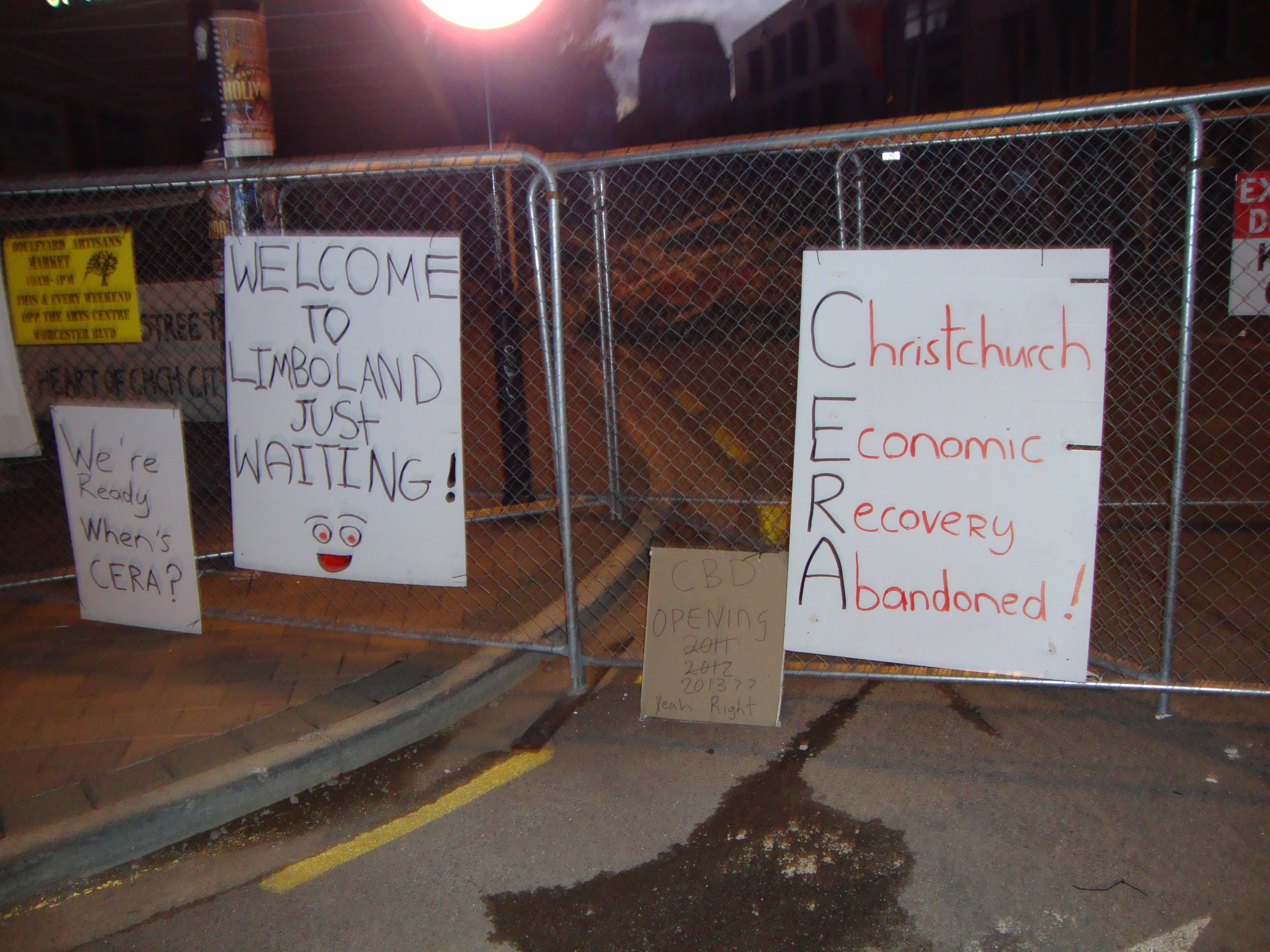
Signs on the red zone cordon placed by unhappy business owners

- 3 May – An interim agreement is signed for the alliance that will rebuild and repair Christchurch. Its members include CERA, the Christchurch City Council, Fletcher Construction, Fulton Hogan, Downer Construction, MacDow New Zealand and City Care.
- 14 May – Share an Idea expo is held throughout the weekend and is attended by 10,000 people. It gives the public an opportunity to share ideas for the central city rebuild.
- 27 May – It is announced that the next census, which was originally scheduled for 8 March 2011 but was cancelled due to the February earthquake, will take place in March 2013.
- 30 May – The first tenants move back into the HSBC building.

=== June ===
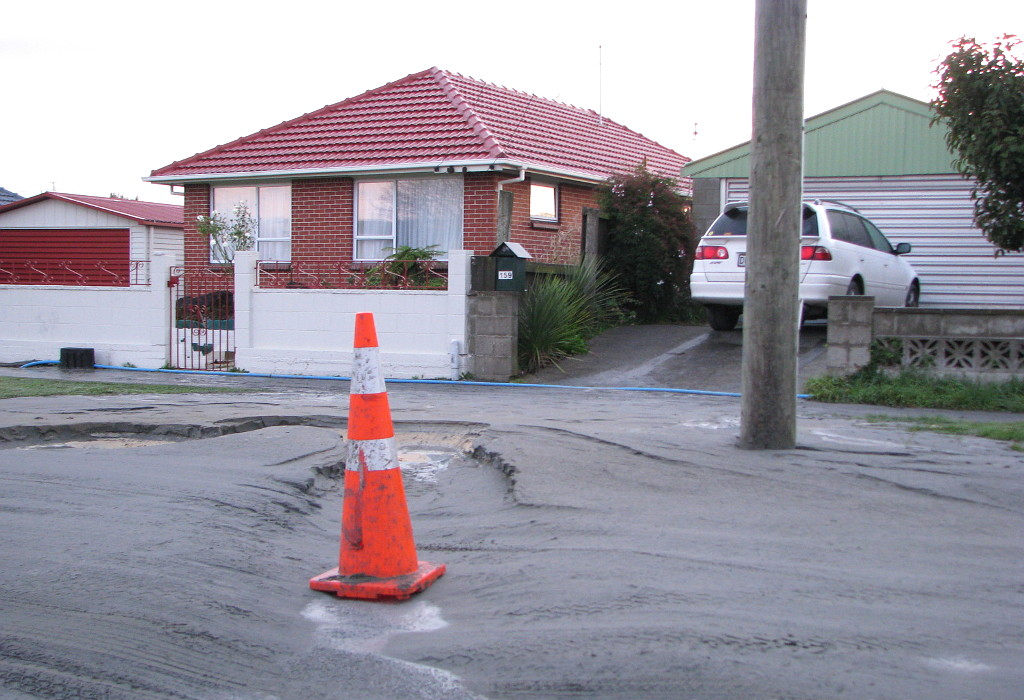
Soil liquefaction caused by the magnitude 6.0 earthquake on 13 June

- 6 June – A magnitude 5.1 aftershock occurs at 9:09 am.
- 9 June – It is announced that by July, the three programmes for accessing the central city Red Zone will be merged into one programme. These programmes are the business access programme, the residents' access programme and the temporary access programme.
- 13 June
  - 1:01 pm – A magnitude 5.3 aftershock occurs.
  - 1 pm – Orion reports a power outage covering 10,000 buildings.
  - 2:20 pm – A magnitude 6.0 aftershock occurs.
  - 2:21 pm – A magnitude 5.2 aftershock occurs.
  - The tower of Lyttelton Timeball Station collapses.
  - 3 pm – Orion reports that the power outage is now affecting 54,000 customers.
  - 3 pm – The National Crisis Management Centre is activated.
- 21 June – A magnitude 5.2 aftershock occurs at 10:34 pm, which causes the airport to close to inspect for damage, and more building damage to occur.
- 23 June
  - The system for residential zoning is announced, which includes the green zone, where properties can be repaired and rebuilt; the red zone, where rebuilding is infeasible; the orange zone, where further assessment is required; and the white zone, "which [is] still being mapped or [is] not residential land."
  - The mapping website landcheck.org.nz is released. It allows residents to enter their address and learn what zone their property is in. Trade Me designed it in four days.
- 28 June – The remaining New Zealand Defence Force personnel leave Christchurch, after 857 days working around the cordon.
- 30 June – The last of city centre cordon is removed. A subsequent ceremony is held where John Key thanks about 120 people of the Defence Force, Navy and Air Force for their work in Christchurch.
- June – 40 temporary homes in Linwood Park become available to tenants.

=== July ===
- 1 July – The government gives up to $16 million to the Canterbury District Health Board to fund earthquake relief.
- 4 July – It is announced that claims paid out by the Earthquake Commission have passed $1 billion. It is also announced that there have been a total of 370,000 claims, including 22,000 from the 13 June aftershock.
- 7 July – The Canterbury District Health Board allocates $1.5 million to funding mental health care services.
- 12 July – New economic indicators are released which shows that before the June earthquakes, retail sales decreased by 8% in Canterbury and 11% in Christchurch.
- 22 July
  - 5:39 am – A magnitude 4.7 aftershock occurs 35 km west of Christchurch.
  - 9:30 am – The red zone opens at a delayed time after being checked following the aftershock. No damage was found.
- 30 July – The "My Housing Options Expo" is held in Addington Events Centre and continues the following day. It is held to inform residential red zone residents about their options. It is attended by 15,000 people.

=== August ===
- August – Forty buildings are added to the demolition list, including the Bus Exchange.
- August – Insured residential property owners are given nine months to select two options for buyout offers from the Crown. Option 1 is "Crown purchase of the property based on the most recent rating valuation for the land, buildings and fixtures, with the Crown taking over all insurance claims for damage to the property." Option 2 is "Crown purchase of the property at the most recent rating valuation of the land, and the Crown taking over the EQC claim for land damage only. Property owners retain the benefit of all insurance claims for the damage to their buildings and fixtures, and continue to deal with EQC and their private insurer to settle those claims."
- 1 August – Otahuna reopens after repairs.
- 16 August – The city's red zone is temporarily closed due to hazards from a snowstorm.
- 19 August – It is announced that in the coming days, the first of the 3000 properties zoned red on 23 June will be mailed buyout offers from the Crown.

=== September ===
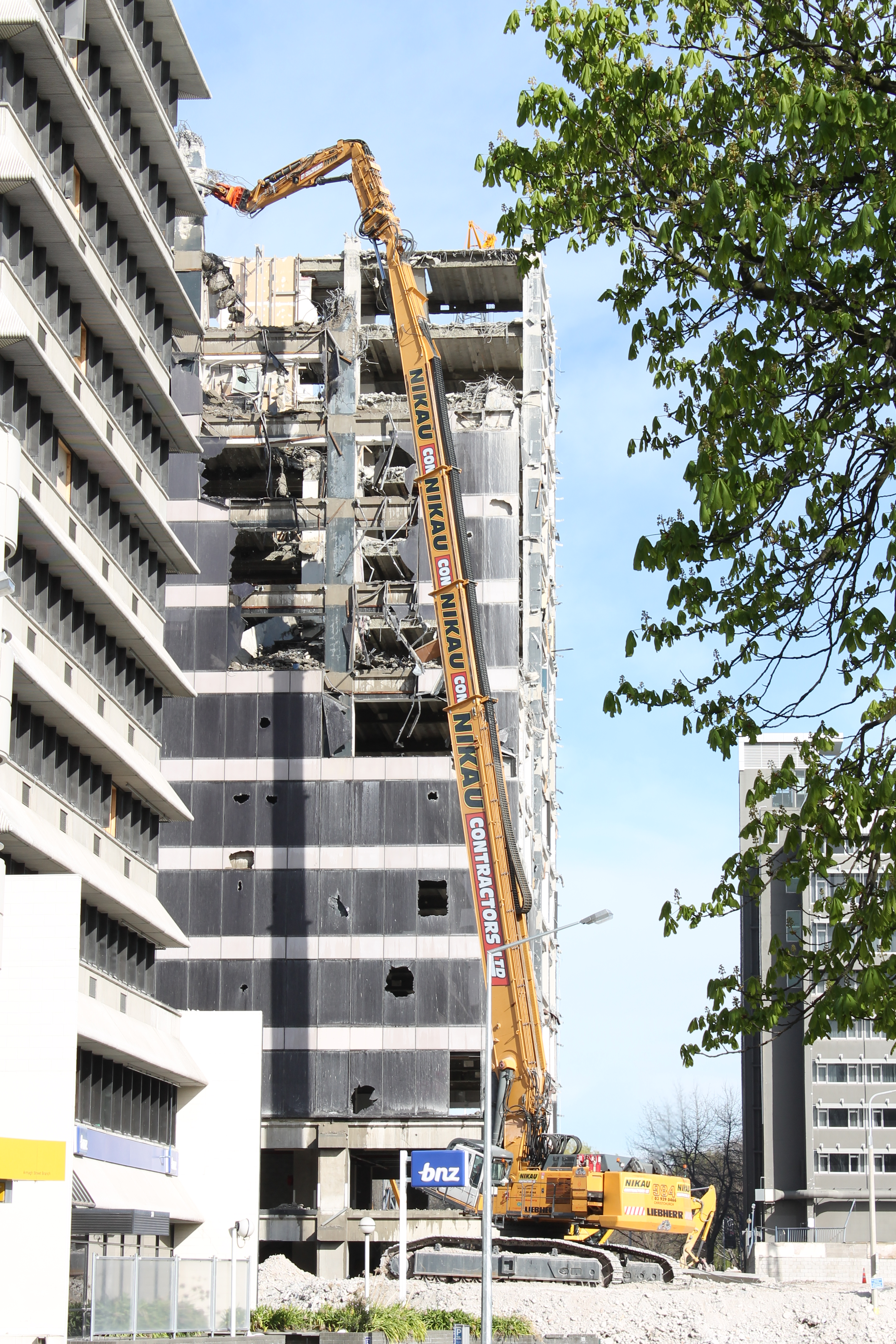
Twinkle Toes demolishing the PricewaterhouseCoopers building in 2012

- September – The excavator Twinkle Toes arrives in the port of Lyttelton to aid in demolition.
- 2 September – Canterbury Museum reopens.
- 5 September
  - 9,700 properties in the Port Hills are rezoned from white to green, which is most of the area. There are 3,700 properties still zoned white.
  - New economic indicators are released showing that "the large earthquakes on 13 June have not had a significant impact on Canterbury's recovery".
  - It is announced that Cabinet has signed off Cera's draft recovery strategy for public consultation.
- 8 September – The Palms Shopping Centre reopens.
- 10 September —The draft recovery strategy opens to public submissions. It sets the goal of having all demolitions finished and cordons removed by 1 April 2012, and have the Central City Red Zone halved by Christmas 2011.
- 13 September – The first owner of a residential red-zoned property receives a payout. It is located in Dallington, and was paid by the government with its land value, which is option two. By this date CERA has sent out 4,853 letters to residential red zone owners, of which, 246 responses have been made choosing option one, and 285 choosing option two.
- 16 September – It is announced that landcheck.org.nz (the website showing which residential zone a property is in) has passed 10 million visits.
- 22 September – The final agreement (after an interim agreement on 3 May 2011) is signed for the alliance managing $2 billion for Christchurch's rebuild. It includes CERA, the New Zealand Transport Agency, the Christchurch City Council, Fulton Hogan, Fletcher Construction, McConnell Dowell, Downer Construction, and City Care.
- 30 September – The Expert Panel Report on the PGC, Forsyth Barr and Hotel Grand Chancellor buildings are released.

=== October ===
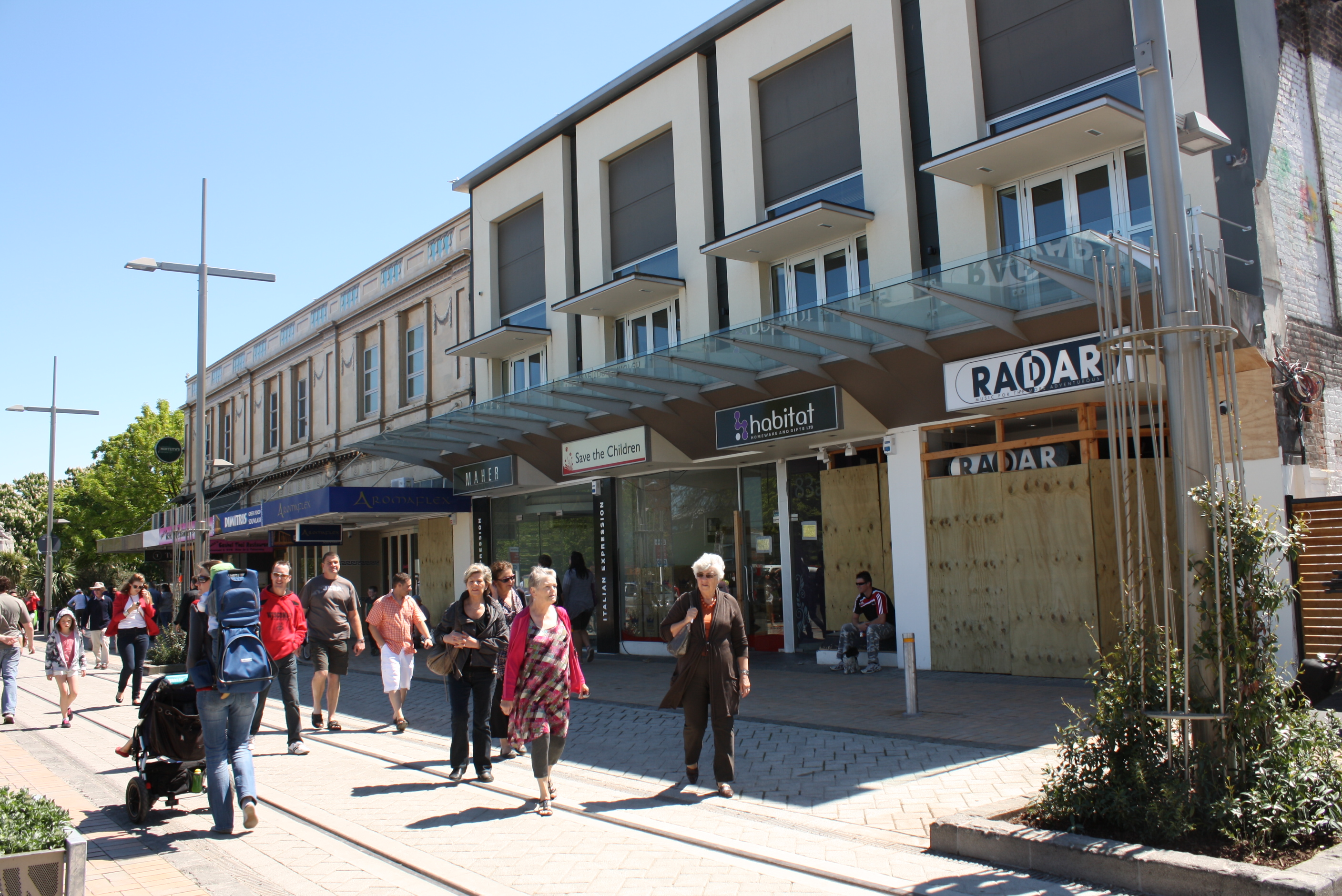
City Mall on opening day: 29 October 2011

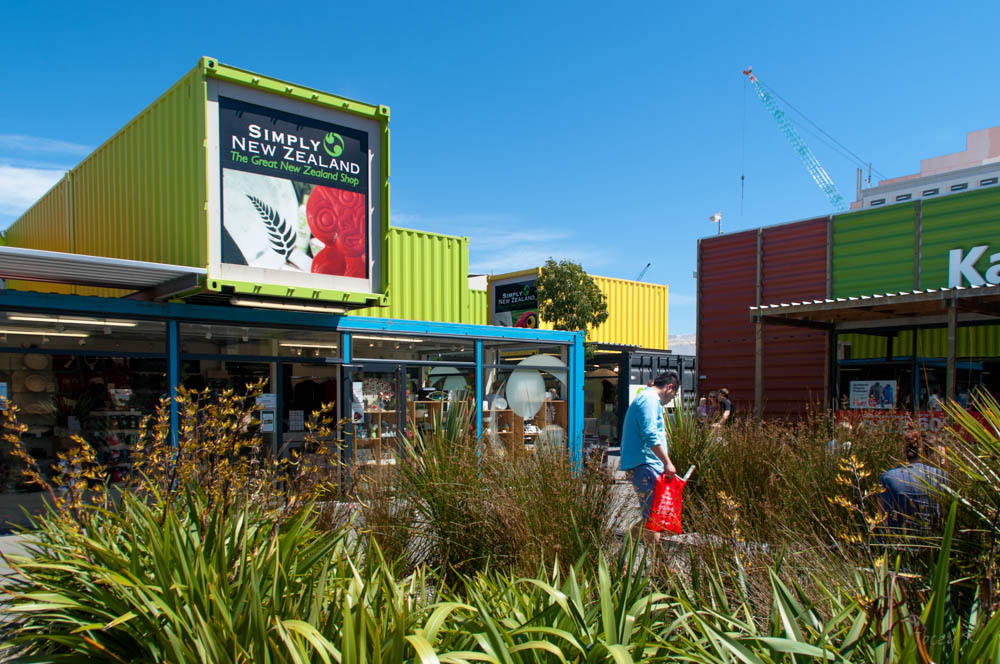
Re:START in November 2013

- October – The civic offices reopen.
- 11 October – The government's response to the draft Central City Recovery Plan is released.
- 14 October
  - New economic indicators are released, showing that spending is around 90–95% of that before the earthquakes.
  - All properties in Banks Peninsula except for 20 are rezoned from white to green (5443 properties). The remaining 20 are still zoned white and require further assessment.
  - After previously been considered for demolition, it is announced that the Nurses' Memorial Chapel will be restored.
  - It is announced that the Canterbury Regional Policy Statement has been changed for residential development.
- 28 October – 6430 residential properties are rezoned from orange to green, which was almost 80% of Canterbury's orange zone.
- 29 October – The pop-up mall Re:START opens.

=== November ===
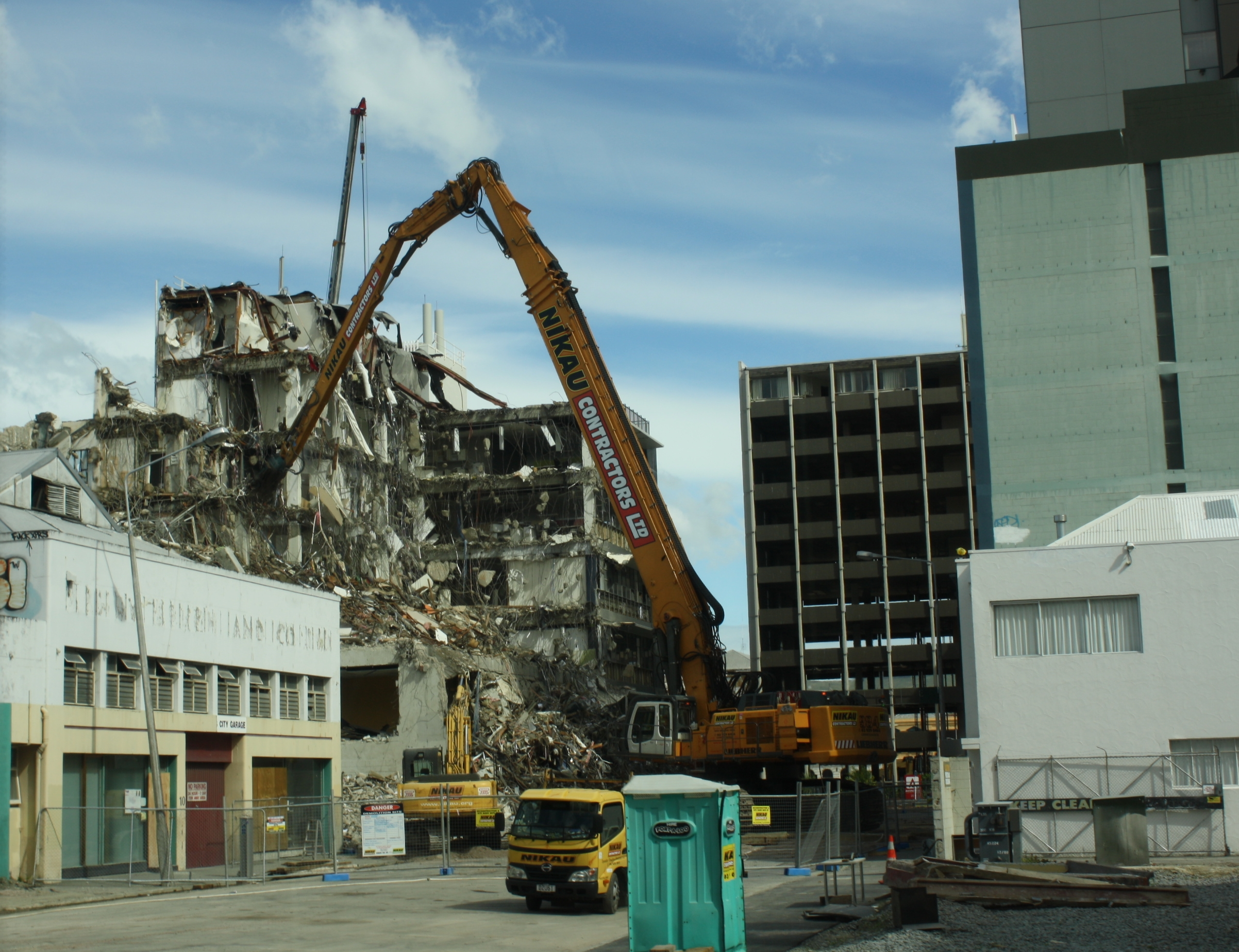
Twinkle Toes demolishing a building in Liverpool Street

- 3 November – CERA announces a new photography competition for local primary, intermediate and secondary school students to show their recovery vision.
- 4 November – All of CERA's documents relating to the ChristChurch Cathedral are released.
- 5 November – Bus tours of the CBD's red zone begin.
- 9 November – Christ Church Cathedral is deconsecrated.
- 17 November – 8,300 non-residential properties are zoned green after previously in the white zone. 417 properties are zoned red in Brooklands and 341 are zoned green. Over 90% of the residential orange zone has now been rezoned.
- 22 November – Bus trips in the CBD's red zone are made available on Saturdays between 1 pm and 7 pm and Sundays between 9 am and 7 pm.
- 26 November – A walkway surrounded with security fences opens between Cathedral Square and Cashell Mall opens for the first time. It is opened during weekends and closed during weekdays until 24 December.

=== December ===
- 2 December – Tickets for the red zone bus tours sell out.
- 9 December – A revised guide for the repairing and reconstruction of houses is published by the Department of Building and Housing.
- 10–11 December – The MainPower My Housing Options Expo is held at Kaiapoi High School.
- 11 December – The final red zone bus tour takes place. They begin again in July 2012.
- 12 December
  - Entries close to CERA's school student photography competition.
  - The tender to demolish the Crowne Plaza Hotel is awarded.
- 13 December – A door-to-door programme starts, to contact 6,000 of Christchurch's homes in the orange and red zones. It is done to "ensure people living in the city's suburban red and orange zones are able to access services and support," and make people aware about services available and how to use them.
- 14 December – CERA launches its cordon reduction map website, which displays a timelapse of the cordon. At this date, it measures 0.7 km^{2} (0.27 sq mi), down from 3.9 km^{2} (1.5 sq mi) in February.
- 15 December – The door-to-door programme ends.
- 16 December – Part of the eastern section of the CBD's red zone cordon reduced at 4 pm, opening up Latimer Square.
- 17 December – 1:31pm – A panel discussion about the earthquakes and insurance is aired on Maori Television for 29 minutes. It is broadcast again the following day.
- 19 December – 1,600 properties in the Port Hills area are rezoned from white to green.
- 23 December
  - 1:58 pm – A magnitude 5.8 aftershock occurs, and is followed by several earthquakes within the same day. They cause sewage overflows, water supply issues, liquefaction and 26,000 buildings to lose power. All council buildings are temporarily closed.
  - 2:00 pm – A magnitude 5.0 aftershock occurs.
  - 2:06 pm – A magnitude 5.4 aftershock occurs.
  - 3:18 pm – A magnitude 5.9 aftershock occurs.
- 24 December – The Cathedral Square Walkway is open for the final time of 2011. At the time it is reported that this would be the last time it would ever open.

== 2012 ==
=== January ===
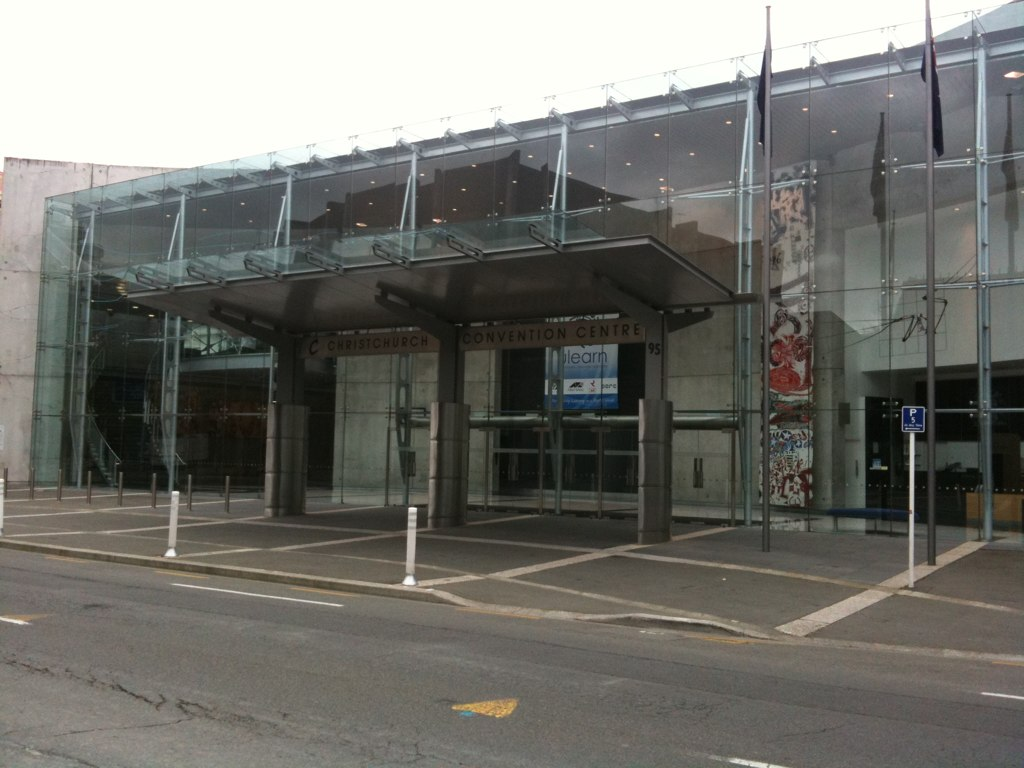
Christchurch Convention Centre in 2009

- Undated – Demolition of the BNZ building begins.
- Undated – Demolition of the Christchurch Convention Centre begins.
- 2 January
  - 1:27 am – A magnitude 5.1 earthquake occurs offshore.
  - 5:45 am – A magnitude 5.5 earthquake occurs offshore. It causes 10,000 homes to lose power. Electricity was restored by 8 am.
- 4 January – The CERA office reopens following the closure after the December aftershocks. Inspections declare the building safe.
- 7 January – A magnitude 5.2 earthquake occurs at 1:21 am.
- 12 January – CERA adds 27 buildings to the demolition list, including five heritage buildings such as Odeon Theatre. By this date, there have been 719 building demolitions in Canterbury.
- 20 January – A construction worker is taken to hospital after being injured on the Hotel Grand Chancellor's demolition site.
- 21 January – A discussion about the 23 December earthquakes is televised on Maori television. With a runtime of 29 minutes, it starts at 1:31pm and is broadcast again the following day.

=== February ===
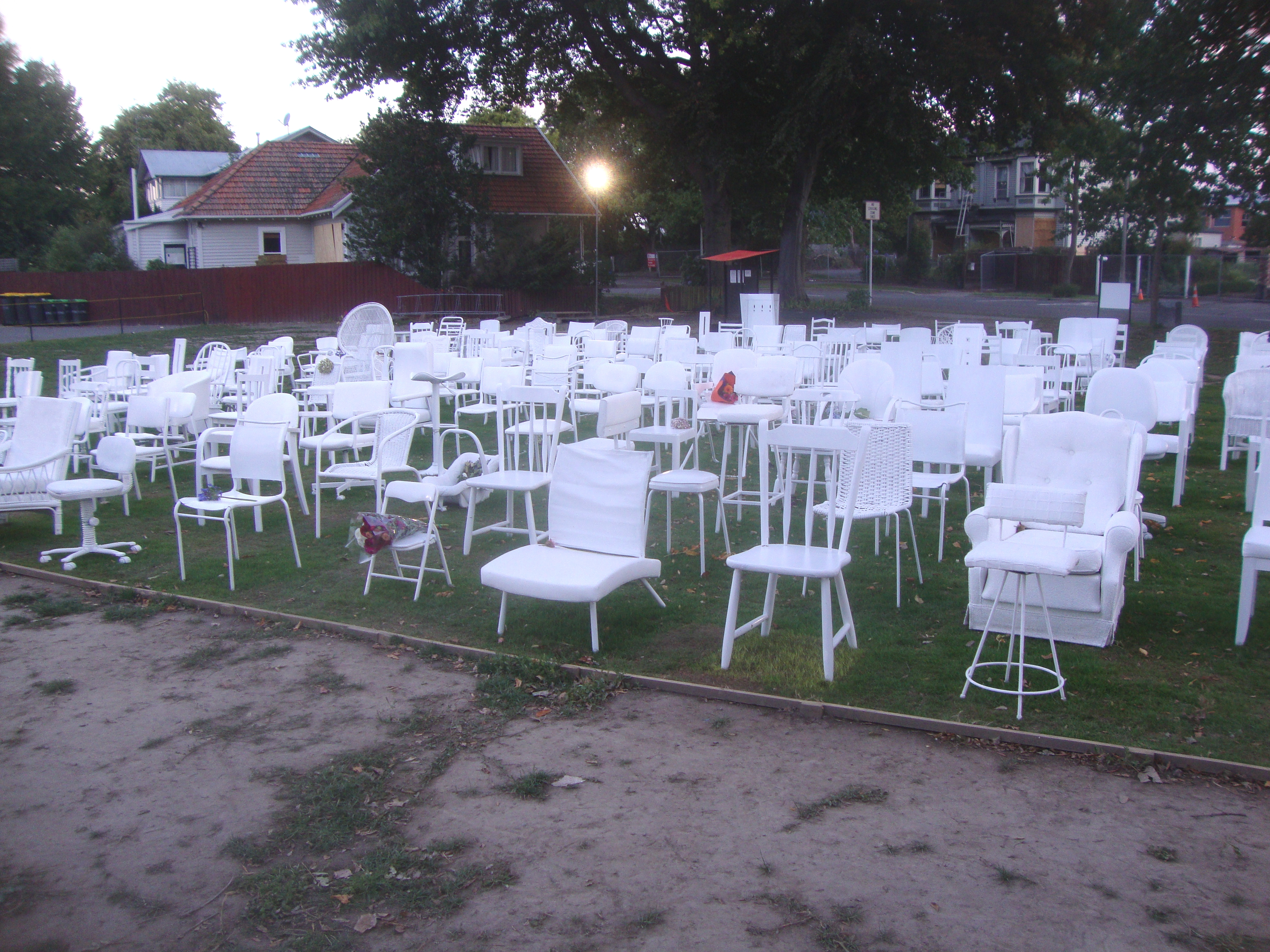
185 empty chairs

- 4 February – Demolition starts on two buildings of the Terrace on the Park apartment complex following damage from the 23 December earthquakes. Demolition started 'urgently' under the Cera Act.
- 9 February – The technical report about the collapse of the CTV Building is released. It found that the CTV Building did not meet building standards when it was built.
- 10 February – 255 residential properties are rezoned from orange. Of these, 213 are zoned red and 42 are zoned green. There are 653 properties still zoned orange, with 401 being in Southshore.
- 13 February – Park Terrace has one lane out of three temporarily closed, and traffic is closed to Salisbury Street. This is due to the demolitions of the Terrace on the Park buildings.
- 15 February – The owner of the Holiday Inn confirms that the building will be demolished.
- 17 February – After concerns were made about the structural integrity of a building on Riccarton Road, it is cordoned off. This caused Rotheram Street to become one-way.
- 21 February – The interment site for the February 2011 earthquake is unveiled at Avonhead Park Cemetery.
- 22 February – The 185 empty chairs memorial is unveiled.

=== March ===
- March – Partial demolition of Christ Church Cathedral starts.
- March – By this date, there are 7000 red zoned properties, of which, 5000 have accepted buyout offers from the Crown. 2590 home owners had already moved after being paid a total of $487 million.
- 2 March – Bishop Victoria Mathews announces that Christ Church Cathedral will be demolished.
- 14 March – Demolition of the PricewaterhouseCoopers building begins.
- 18 March – The Cathedral Square walkway opens for the final time due to demolition of the BNZ building. On this day, 18,700 people went through the walkway, and 13,300 people walked through it on the previous day.
- 23 March
  - 250 orange zoned properties next to Avon River are rezoned to red. This includes 144 in south Richmond, 78 south of the central city and 29 in Linwood.
  - A new temporary village to ease the demand for short-term housing is announced. It will be located at Rawhiti Domain.
  - A delay is announced for the rezoning of the 401 Southshore properties that are still in the orange zone.
  - 251 residential properties are rezoned from orange to red. They are located near the Avon River, and were zoned red due to widespread liquefaction. Of these properties, 144 are located in Richmond South, 78 in Central City South and 29 in Linwood.

=== April ===
- 18 April – The establishment of the Central Christchurch Development Unit (CCDU) is announced, as a division of CERA. It will be "responsible for the implementation of the Central City Plan".
- 20 April – The deadline for the Crown's offers to buy red-zoned residential properties is extended by three months. This was made due to the effects of aftershocks on insurance details of option 2.
- 22 April – Remains of Christ Church Cathedral's tower starts being pulled down.
- 24 April – A magnitude 6.2 earthquake occurs 35 kilometres south-east of Saint Arnaud at 3:36 pm.
- 26 April – Demolition of Crowne Plaza Hotel is described as almost complete.
- 27 April
  - CERA's documents about the ChristChurch Cathedral are released to the public. This follows a similar move in November 2011.
  - A four-week trial for placing "prohibited access" signs on vacated Crown-owned properties in the North East Kaiapoi Red Zone is announced, aiming to deter crime.

=== May ===
- 1 May – Despite CERA aiming for a decision by the end of April, it is announced that Southshore's rezoning decision had not yet been reached.
- 8 May – Hotel Grand Chancellor finishes being demolished.
- 18 May
  - 198 properties in Southshore West are zoned red and 203 properties are zoned green, resulting in there being no more orange-zoned properties in Christchurch.
  - 421 properties in the Port Hills are zoned green.
  - It is announced that after analysis of the Parklands East land following the 23 December earthquakes, it will continue to be zoned green. It will also continue being in Department of Building and Housing Technical Category 3.
- 25 May – A magnitude 5.5 earthquake occurs at 2:44 pm.
- 31 May – CERA releases the Recovery Strategy.
- May – Zoning of flat residential land is completed.

=== June ===
- 6 June – The Avondale Earthquake Assistance Centre temporarily closes due to heavy snow.
- 8 June – Canterbury Club, a historic gentlemen's club, reopens.
- 14 June – Durham North reopens, initially operating one way from east to west. This splits the red zone in two.
- 15 June
  - A review process for the land zoning of residential flat land properties is announced.
  - It is announced that the residential red zone buyout offers will include properties that were being constructed at the time of the February earthquake, including a few not-for-profit non-residential buildings.
  - Gloucester Street reopens.
- 25 June – The Royal Commission of Inquiry starts hearing evidence about the CTV Building collapse.
- 29 June
  - 1,107 residential Port Hills properties are rezoned from white to green. 285 properties are zoned red due to collapsing cliffs or rock fall, or the possibility for that to occur. There are still 166 properties zoned white, as further assessment is needed regarding these hazards.
  - The Royal Commission of Inquiry delivers part one of its final report.
- 30 June – Applications for the flat land zoning review are due.
- June – The 5000th residential red zone property owner agrees to sell to the Crown.

=== July ===
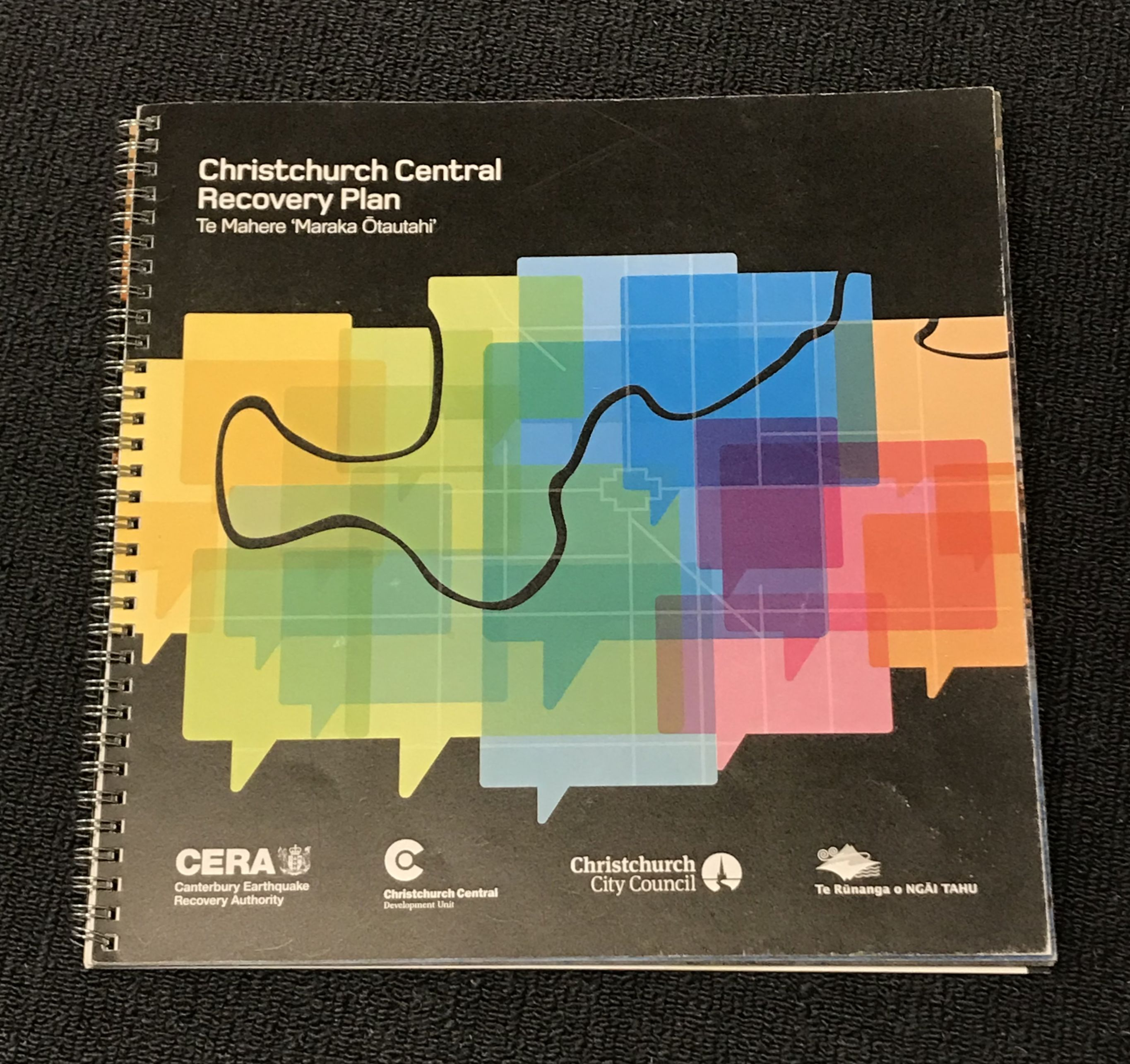
Hard copy of the Christchurch Central Recovery Plan

- 11 July – A half-hour panel discussion is held, to discuss heating quake-damaged homes in a safe manner, and how to reduce the power bill.
- 15 July – The part of Gloucester Street between Manchester Street and Durham St North is closed from 1pm to 5pm, allowing only pedestrians through.
- 17 July – Bus tours of the CBD's red zone begin, which operate daily from 10am to 2am. They are operated by Red Bus and tickets cost $15.
- 24 July – Construction starts on Cardboard Cathedral.
- 30 July – The Christchurch Central Recovery Plan is published.
- 31 July – John Key attends a tree planting ceremony in Victoria Square, and is assisted by students from Discovery 1 School and Unlimited Paenga Tawhiti.
- July – The Rawhiti Domain Temporary Accommodation Village opens with 20 temporary units. The total number of government-funded temporary units is now 83.

=== August ===
Implosion of Radio Network House

- 5 August – Radio Network House is imploded, becoming the first building demolished by implosion in New Zealand.
- 6 August – CERA holds a community meeting about the Christchurch Central Recovery Plan from 2 to 4 pm.
- 8 August
  - After previously refusing, Gerald Shirtcliff, a supervisor to the construction of the CTV Building, gives evidence to the royal inquiry about the building's collapse.
  - CERA holds a community meeting about the Christchurch Central Recovery Plan from 6 to 8 pm.
- 9 August – CERA holds a community meeting about the Christchurch Central Recovery Plan from 6 to 8 pm.
- 10 August – CERA holds a community meeting about the Christchurch Central Recovery Plan from 2 to 4 pm.
- 17 August – 121 Port Hills properties are rezoned from white to red, and five properties are rezoned green.
- 15 August – Demolition begins on the old Christchurch railway station.
- 16 August – An interactive 3D display, known as Liquid Galaxy, shows the future of Christchurch to the public. It is open daily from 8:30 am to 5 pm until 24 August.
- 23 August – The government releases part one of the Royal Commission of Inquiry's final report.

=== September ===
- 6 September – Tuam Street reopens for the first time since February 2011.
- 7 September – A five-year schedule for the rebuild of damaged roads and underground services is released.
- 13 September – 37 residential properties in the Port Hills are zoned red. This marks the end of rezoning the white zoned properties in the Port Hills at risk from rock roll.
- 15 September – The Press runs a story accusing Gerald Shirtcliff of identity theft and faking his engineering degree.
- 20 September – CERA releases a request for proposal for a philanthropic consultancy to "link the region with opportunities offered by the variety of philanthropic and corporate organisations wanting to aid the recovery".
- 24 September – Gloucester Street is temporarily closed due to demolitions.
- 27 September
  - The government extends its Temporary Accommodation Allowance.
  - CERA releases geotechnical data, including ground cracking, liquefaction, lateral spread, and ground elevation.
- September – It is reported that a total of 1350 buildings have been totally or partially demolished.
- September – Deconstruction of the Edmonds Band Rotunda is finished.

=== October ===
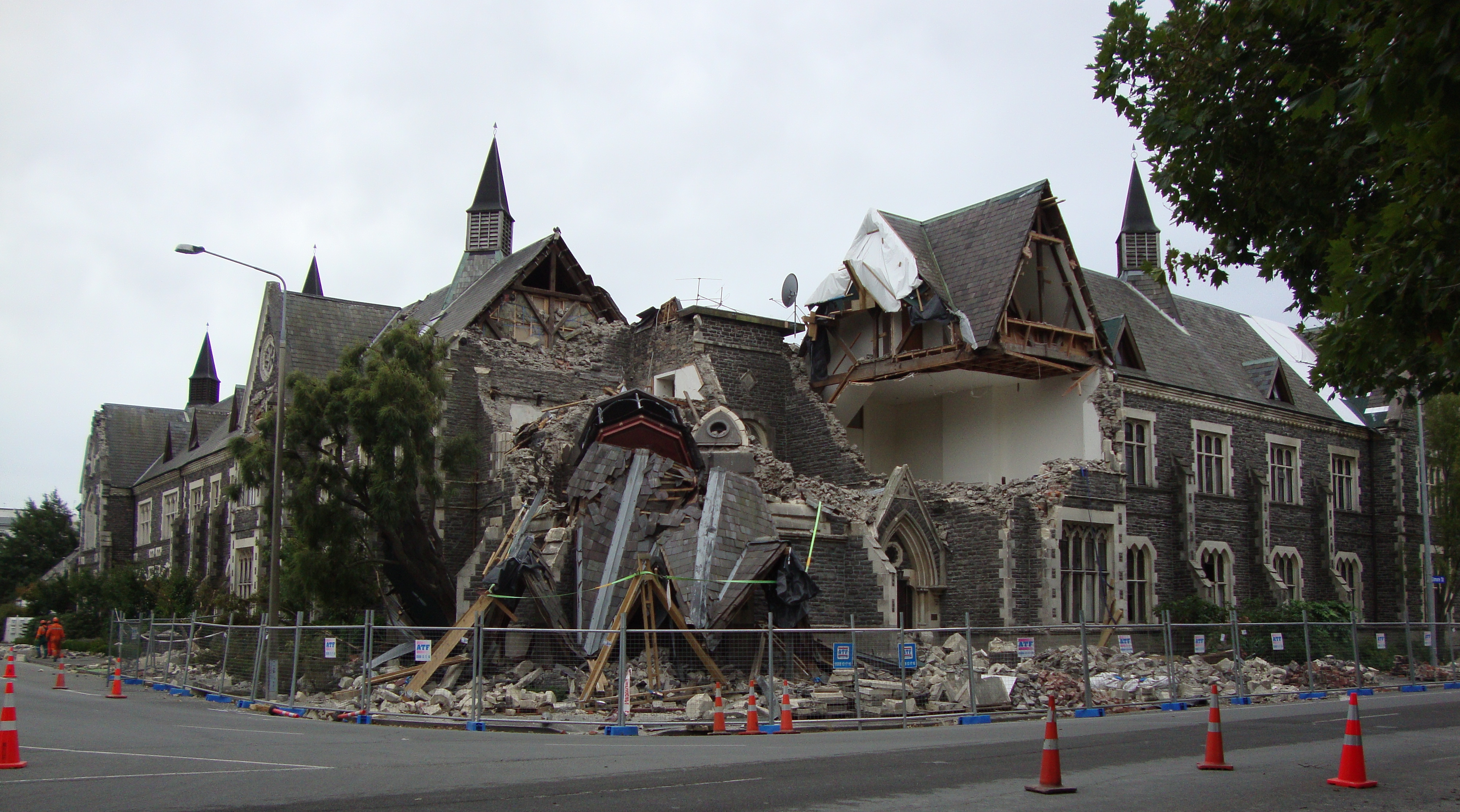
Cranmer Court in March 2011

- October – Demolition of the Farmers car park building begins.
- October – Two men steal a dishwasher from an unoccupied residential red zone property in Dallington, and are later respectfully sentenced to imprisonment, home detention and community work.
- 4 October – Cranmer Court, one of Christchurch's oldest buildings, starts being demolished. This is met with protests.
- 9 October
  - It is announced that over 6,000 residential red zone property owners have agreed to sell their properties to the Crown. This is over 88% of all properties that have received offers. Of these, 4775 sales have been settled for a total of about $947 million.
  - The Port Hills land-zoning review is announced. The deadline for the applications of property owners to participate in the review is 26 October.
- 10 October
  - The Royal Commission of Inquiry delivers part two of its final report, outlining recommendations for buildings that are earthquake-prone.
  - Brownlee hosts a workshop session for over 100 rebuild stakeholders to work on issues regarding the rebuild on Technical Category 3 land.
- 11 October – The council votes to pause the demlition of Cranmer Court for one month, but demolition still continues.
- 29 October – Ballantynes and City Mall are officially reopened, becoming the first significant central Christchurch area to reopen.
- 26 October:
  - Applications for the Port Hills zoning review are due.
  - A Port Hills 3D rockfall study is released by CERA.
- 31 October
  - Eight final residential Port Hills properties are rezoned from white to green. All properties in Christchurch are now either zoned green (181,000 properties) or zoned red (7,860 properties).
  - Applications for the Port Hills Zoning Review have been counted up. There were 132 applications, with 72 applicants being zoned Red but wanting to be zoned Green, and 60 applicants zoned Green but wanting to be zoned Red.

=== November ===
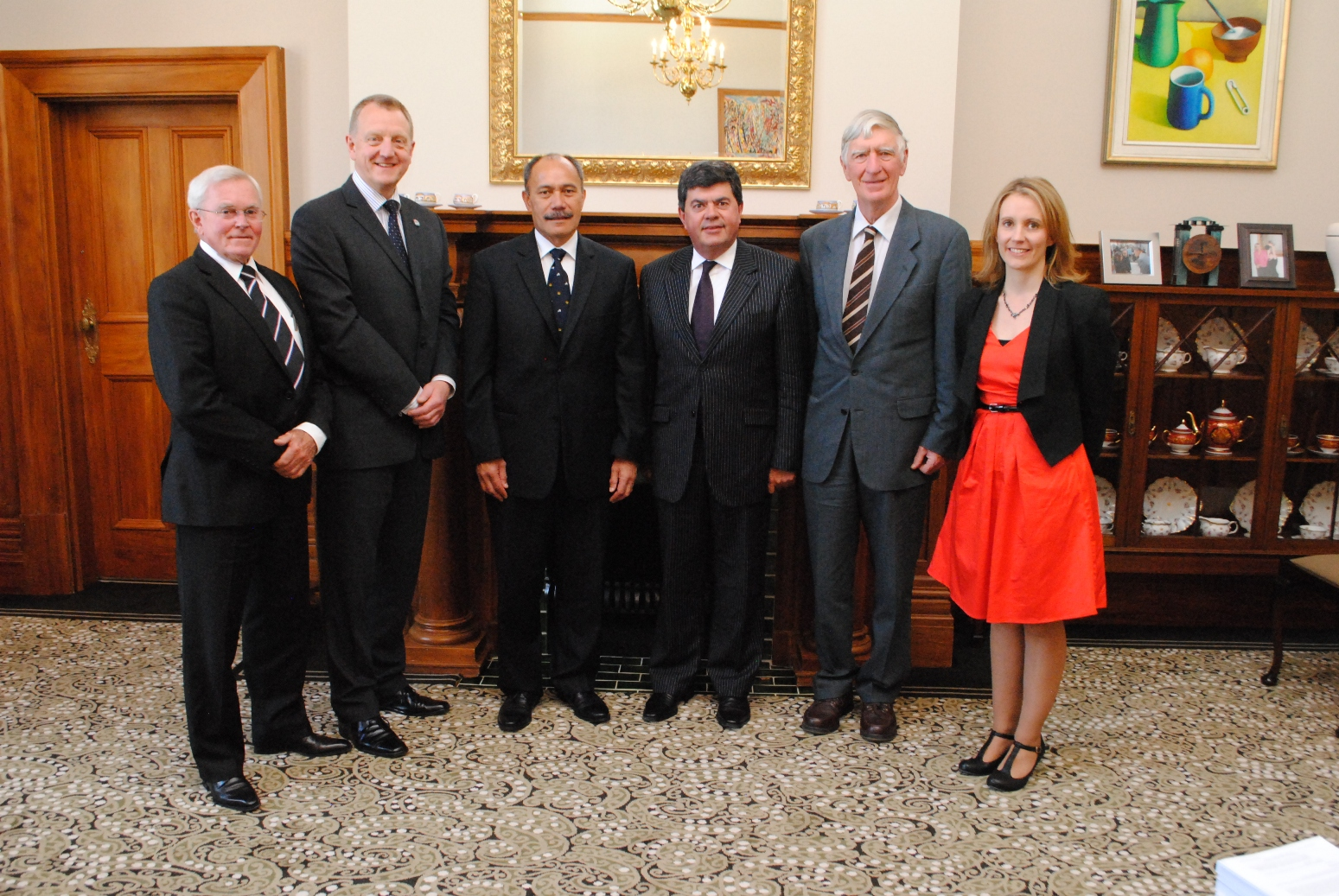
Handover of the final report of the Canterbury Earthquakes Royal Commission, at Government House, Wellington, on 29 November 2012. Left to right: Sir Ron Carter; Colin McDonald (secretary and chief executive of the Department of Internal Affairs); the governor-general, Sir Jerry Mateparae; Mark Cooper; Richard Fenwick; and Justine Gilliland (executive director of the Royal Commission).

- 9 November – C1 Espresso is reopened by Gerry Brownlee.
- 15 November – The draft Transport Plan is opened for public consultation, with submissions either being made physically or on the Christchurch Central Development Unit website.
- 23 November – The Canterbury Skills and Employment Hub opens to assist employers with finding workers for the rebuild.
- 24 November – Demolition of the eight-story URS House, an office block on the corner of Gloucester and Durham Streets, begins with the expectation of finishing in under 48 hours.
- 29 November – The Royal Commission of Inquiry into Building Failure caused by Canterbury Earthquakes delivers part three of its final report. It says that the CTV Building did not meet the building standards when it was built, and should have never been given a resource consent in 1986.
- November – Twinkle Toes finishes demolishing the Centra Building.

=== December ===
- 6 December —The Economic Recovery Programme for Greater Christchurch is launched, which was developed by CERA and the Ministry of Business, Innovation and Employment.
- 7 December – The government releases part two of the Royal Commission of Inquiry's final report.
- 10 December —The government releases part three of the Royal Commission of Inquiry's final report.
- 20 December – It is announced that a multi-company consortium, led by Opus, has been selected to design and develop the Avon River Precinct and the North and East Frames.

== 2013 ==
=== January ===
- 30 January – 2,000 cubic metres of soil is donated to the CBD rebuild from Prestons Roads Ltd.

=== February ===
- 1 February – Public consultation submissions for the draft Transport Plan chapter An Accessible City are closed.
- 8 February – CERA releases a timelapse video of the CBD rebuild from 1 February 2012 to 31 January 2013, facing Cathedral Square.
- 16 February – The Red Zone cordon is officially renamed to the Rebuild Zone.
- 21 February – A delay is announced for the Port Hills zoning review.
- 28 February – Foundations start being laid for a new four-storey office block on the corner of High and Lichfield Streets.
- February – Restoration on the Puaka–James Hight Building of the University of Canterbury finishes.
- February – Demolition of Clarendon Tower finishes.
- February – The Durham Street Front of House opens.
- February – The Quake City exhibition at the Canterbury Museum opens.
- February – Housing New Zealand announces the Repair 5000 scheme, which has the goal of repairing or rebuilding 5,000 homes by 2015.

=== March ===
- 6 March – Tourism operators are asked to start submitting proposals for rebuild zone tours.
- 23 March – Construction begins on the Avon River Precinct.
- 27 March – It is announced that three companies have been selected to give tours inside the CBD Rebuild Zone.
- 28 March – The Rebuild Zone is reduced "on Hereford Street, west of the Colombo Street intersection, and the Triangle Centre area and upper section of High Street".

=== April ===
- 10 April – It is announced that the Port Hills zoning review has been postponed, meaning that decisions will not be announced in the following week.
- 19 April
  - The Residential Advisory Service, a free advisory service for residential property owners with rebuild or repair problems, is announced.
  - The Rebuild Zone cordon is reduced through a section of Cambridge Terrace, making the PGC site accessible to the public. The "city-side of the Avon River between Hereford and Armagh Streets" is opened to pedestrians.
- 20 April – New Regent Street and the area surrounding it reopens.

=== May ===
- May – Repair work begins on the Bridge of Remembrance.
- 1 May – The Rendezvous Hotel in the Pacific Tower reopens.
- 3 May – By this date, there have been a total of 1909 residential red zone clearances. Sales and Purchase Agreements have also been signed for 7057 properties, of the 7433 that are eligible.
- 14 May – "[P]arts of High Street, between Cashel and Lichfield Streets, and between Lichfield and Tuam Streets, [are] reopened to pedestrians", and a temporary pedestrian corridor in Cathedral Square is opened.
- 15 May — By this date there have been 2074 demolitions in the residential red zone, and 6059 properties in the zone have been sold to the Crown.
- 16 May – The Residential Advisory Service becomes available to property owners.
- 21 May – Sutton delivers a speech at a United Nations forum, the Global Platform for Disaster Risk Reduction. He describes the damage in Canterbury and the response.
- 25 May – It is announced that the Lyttelton Timeball will be restored after the project received a $1 million donation.
- 28 May – It is confirmed that residential red zone property owners under certain circumstances will be able to apply for an extension for their settlement dates for buyout offers.
- 31 May
  - It is announced that residents of Lucas Lane in the Port Hills will be able to move in soon, as the removal of 40,000 cubic metres of loose fill from the above quarry was completed.
  - A $170 million programme is announced, named the 700 New Builds programme, to build 700 new homes in Housing New Zealand land.

=== June ===
- 6 June – Demolition of the Craigs Investment Partners House begins.
- 7 June – The area north of Gloucester Street reopens.
- 10 June – The deadline for Port Hills property buyout offers is extended to 31 January 2014.
- 14 June – Cordon reductions to some areas west of Manchester Street is completed. A few dangerous buildings in that area are kept fenced off.
- 21 June – Out of 316 requests, 92 residential red zone property owners who have agreed to sell to the Crown have their settlement dates extended.
- 26 June – CERA releases the Canterbury Wellbeing Index.
- 27 June – The Amazing Place playground winners are announced by the prime minister.
- 30 June
  - The last of the Rebuild Zone cordon is removed.
  - At this date there are 1,092 employers registered with the Canterbury Skills and Employment Hub.
- June – Demand for temporary accommodation is at its peak.

=== July ===
- July – Demolition of the Copthorne Hotel begins.
- 17 July – The Crown buys the CTV site, which will end up being used for the East Frame.

=== August ===
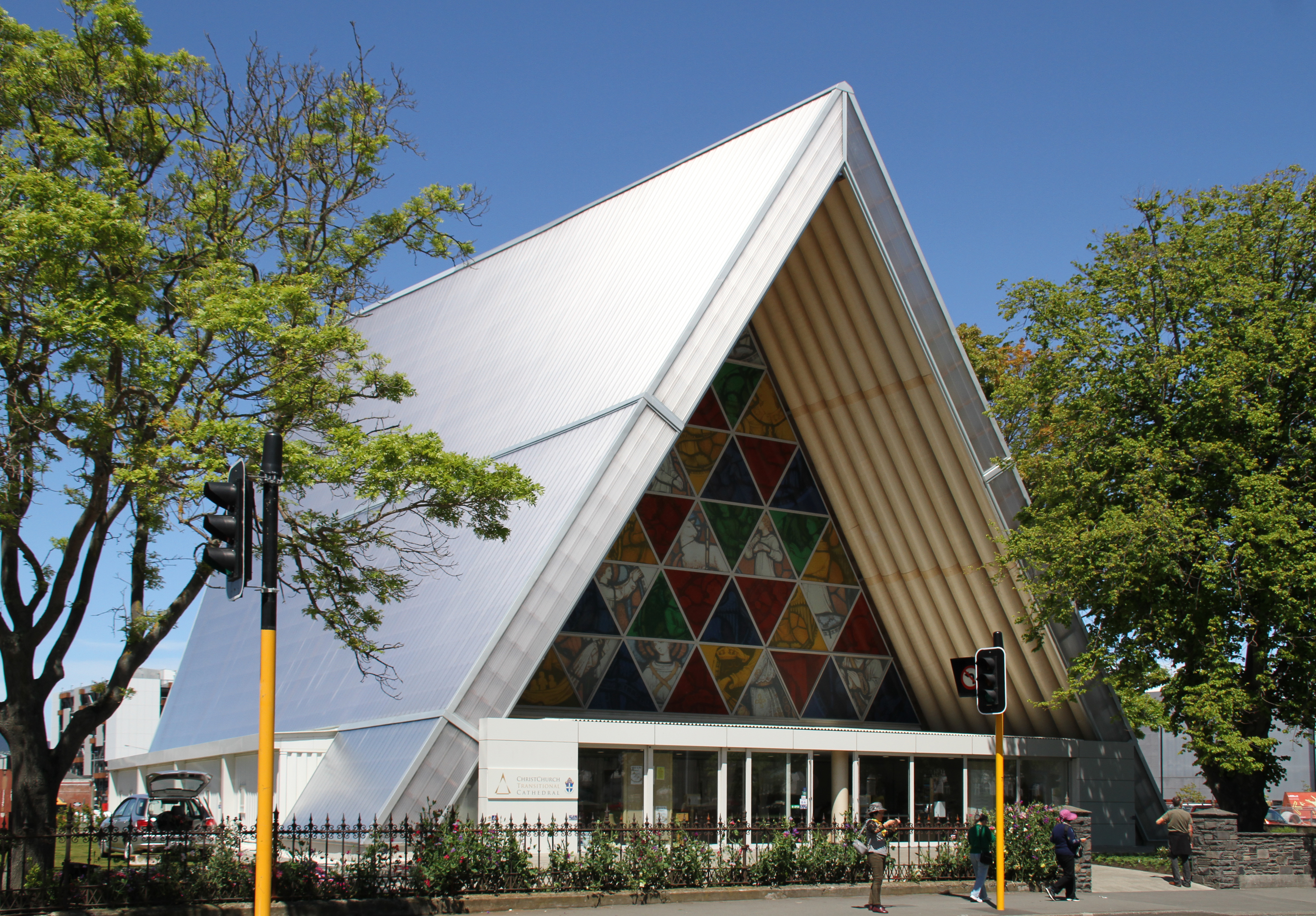
Cardboard Cathedral in 2016

- 6 August – The Cardboard Cathedral (the transitional cathedral for the ChristChurch Cathedral) opens to the public.
- 9 August – The Crown begins sending out final purchase offers for central city properties that are located within the bounds of priority anchor projects.
- 19 August – Novotel Hotel reopens.
- 28 August – The Port Hills land-zoning review announcement is delayed due to the Quake Outcasts High Court decision on 26 August.
- 29 August
  - City councillors unanimously vote to restore the Christchurch Town Hall.
  - The first part of the Te Papa Ōtākaro/Avon River Precinct is officially opened.
  - The CCDU releases updated timelines for the anchor projects.

=== September ===
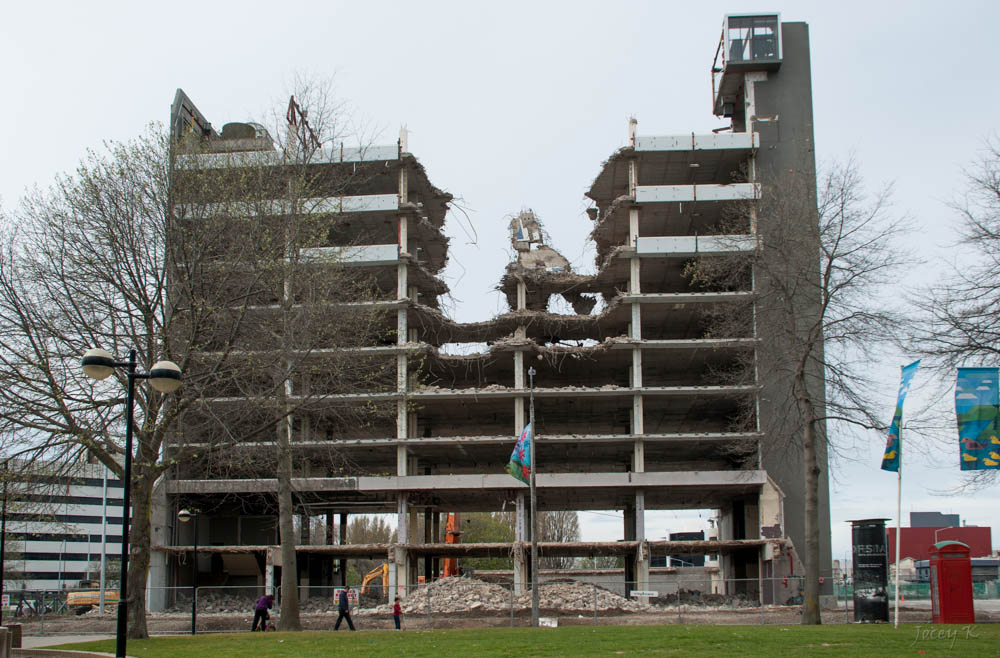
Copthorne Hotel an hour before its collapse

- 2 September – An online interactive map showing the city's progress is released ot the public.
- 5 September – It is announced that the Christchurch Central Development Unit has decided that certain properties in the North and East frames will need to be acquired by the Crown, and some properties will not.
- 18 September – John Key unveils new temporary housing in Linwood Park.
- 19 September – The Crown acquires the property of the former PGC building, which collapsed in the February 2011 earthquake.
- 20 September – Images of The Terraces, the next stage of the Avon River Precinct, are unveiled.
- 23 September – Responses to expressions of interests for being the main construction contractor for the new Justice and Emergency Services Precinct are due.
- 25 September – This year's CERA wellbeing survey opens, targeting youth aged 12–24.
- 28 September – The former Copthorne Hotel collapses unexpectedly during its demolition. No one is injured.

=== October ===
- 2 October – It is announced that the Crown has made its first compulsory land acquisition in the CBD. By land area, it now owns 55% of what it needs for the Anchor Projects.
- 17 October – The design of the Justice Precinct is unveiled by John Key.
- 25 October – Another delay is announced for the Port Hills zoning review, and the expiry date of Crown buyout offers is extended from 31 January 2014 to 31 March 2014.
- 30 October
  - Winners of the Amazing Place competition are announced, with the Year 12/13 team (who made a design for the Retail Precinct) winning $10,000 and their school being awarded $5,000.
  - The Christchurch Central Recovery Plan transport chapter "An Accessible City" is released.
- October – St Paul's Anglican Church in Papanui reopens.

=== November ===
- 1 November – The Youth Wellbeing Survey of 2013 closes.
- 6 November – The Canterbury Earthquakes 2010/11 Port Hills Slope Stability: mass movement Stage One Report is released, which outlines 36 areas of land in the Port Hills that had moved.
- 15 November – The Christchurch Schools Rebuild programme is announced. Over $1.1 billion is allocated to the rebuilding and repairing of 115 severely damaged schools in greater Christchurch within ten years, which accounts for 80 per cent of classrooms in the region.

=== December ===
- Early December – The fence in New Regent Street is removed.
- 3 December
  - The Court of Appeal rules that most residential red zoning of Greater Christchurch was lawful, and that CERA should review their decisions regarding "vacant and uninsured improved properties on the flat land in Christchurch" to check if they were made in accordance with the Canterbury Earthquake Recovery Act.
  - The Waimakariri District Council and the Crown reaches a cost-sharing agreement for council-owned land and horizontal infrastructure repairs. The Crown will contribute $37 million.
- 5 December – The results of the Port Hills Zoning Review are announced. 270 properties are re-zoned, with 237 green-zoned properties being re-zoned red, and 33 are re-zoned from red to green.
- 24 December – CERA's office closes for the holiday period.

== 2014 ==
=== January ===
- 6 January – CERA's office reopens.
- 20 January – Demolition begins on Victoria Apartments.

=== February ===
- 22 February – Scott Base holds a minute of silence at 12:51 pm, marking the three year anniversary of the February 2011 earthquake.

=== April ===
- 11 April – The 1000th repair to a state house in Christchurch is completed.
- 28 April – Demolition of the Civic Offices on Tuam Street begins; the land will be used for the Bus Interchange.

=== May ===
- 5 May – URS begins phase one of its work on delivering the An Accessible City plan.

=== June ===
- 13 June – The northern part of Re:START reopens after being relocated.
- 23 June – The 2014 New Zealand bravery awards are announced to honour acts of bravery after the February 2011 earthquake.
- 24 June – Construction of the new Bus Interchange begins.

=== July ===
- 1 July – It is announced that Fletcher Construction has been awarded the main contract to build the new $300 million Christchurch Justice and Emergency Services Precinct.
- 30 July – A 'public engangement campaign' begins, allowing the public to submit ideas for the Waimakariri District residential red zone.

=== August ===
- Late August – Submissions of Ideas to Remember for the upcoming Canterbury Earthquake Memorial closes; 339 submissions were received.

=== September ===
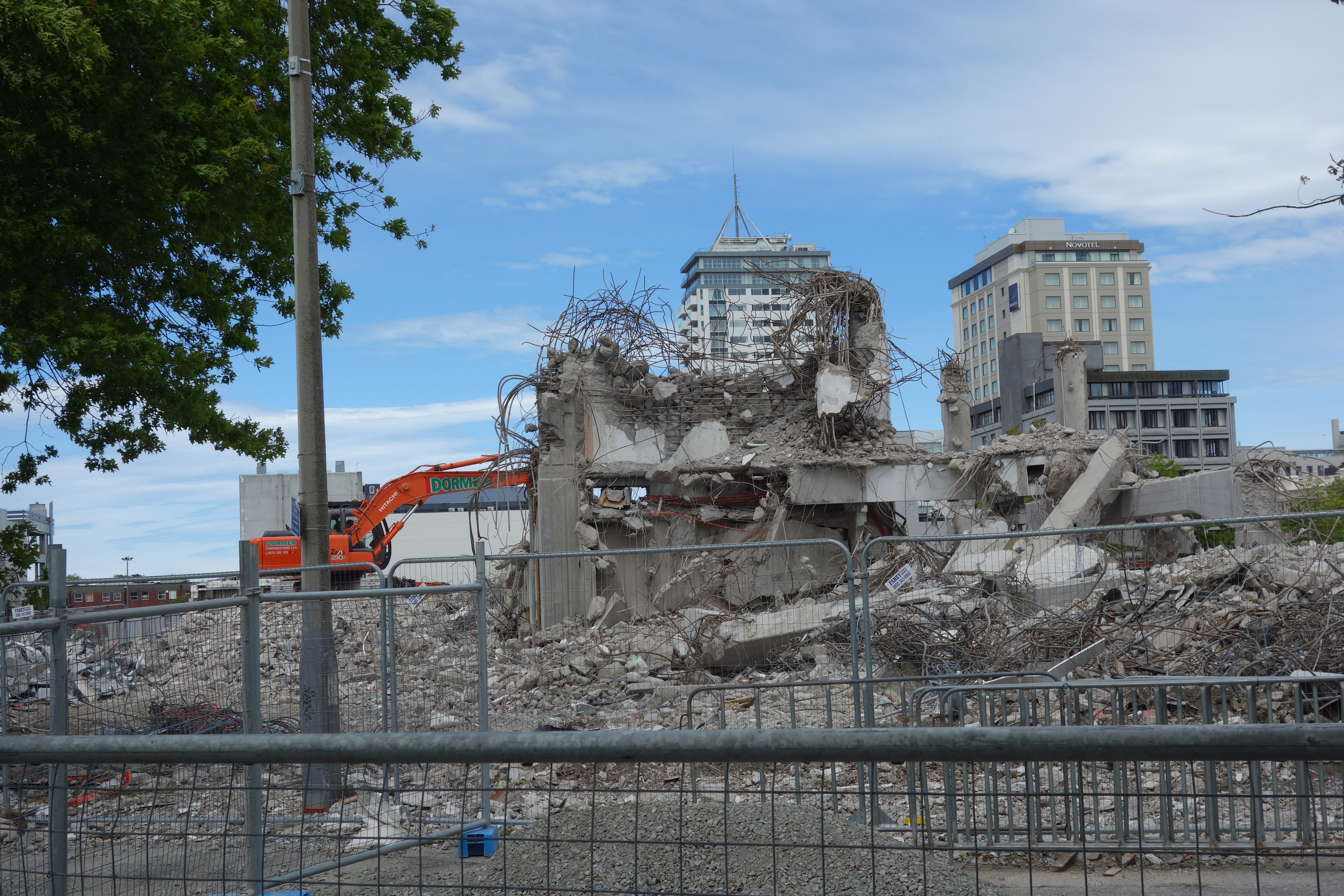
Christchurch Central Library being demolished in November 2014

- 2 September – Brownlee makes several announcements relating to the earthquake recovery, including that CERA will become a Departmental Agency of the Department of Prime Minister and Cabinet.
- 4 September – A five-part mini-documentary series called Christchurch – The Ever Evolving City is released after four months of production and an investment of about $90,000.
- 15 September – It is announced the CERA will move the Detailed Engineering Evaluations programme to local authorities by the end of the year. The programme had classified 13,000 buildings in Greater Christchurch as either high, medium or low risk.
- September – Demolition of the Christchurch Central Library begins.

=== October ===
- October – Construction begins on The Terraces, in the Te Papa Ōtākaro/Avon River Precinct.
- 22 October – The Victoria Clock Tower is unveiled after being restored.

=== November ===
- 13 November – The city council approves two designs for the transport chapter in the Christchurch Central Recovery Plan.
- 19 November – John Ombler is appointed as the acting chief executive officer of CERA.

== 2015 ==
=== February ===
- 20 February – By this date, there have been about 1240 demolitions in central Christchurch.

=== May ===
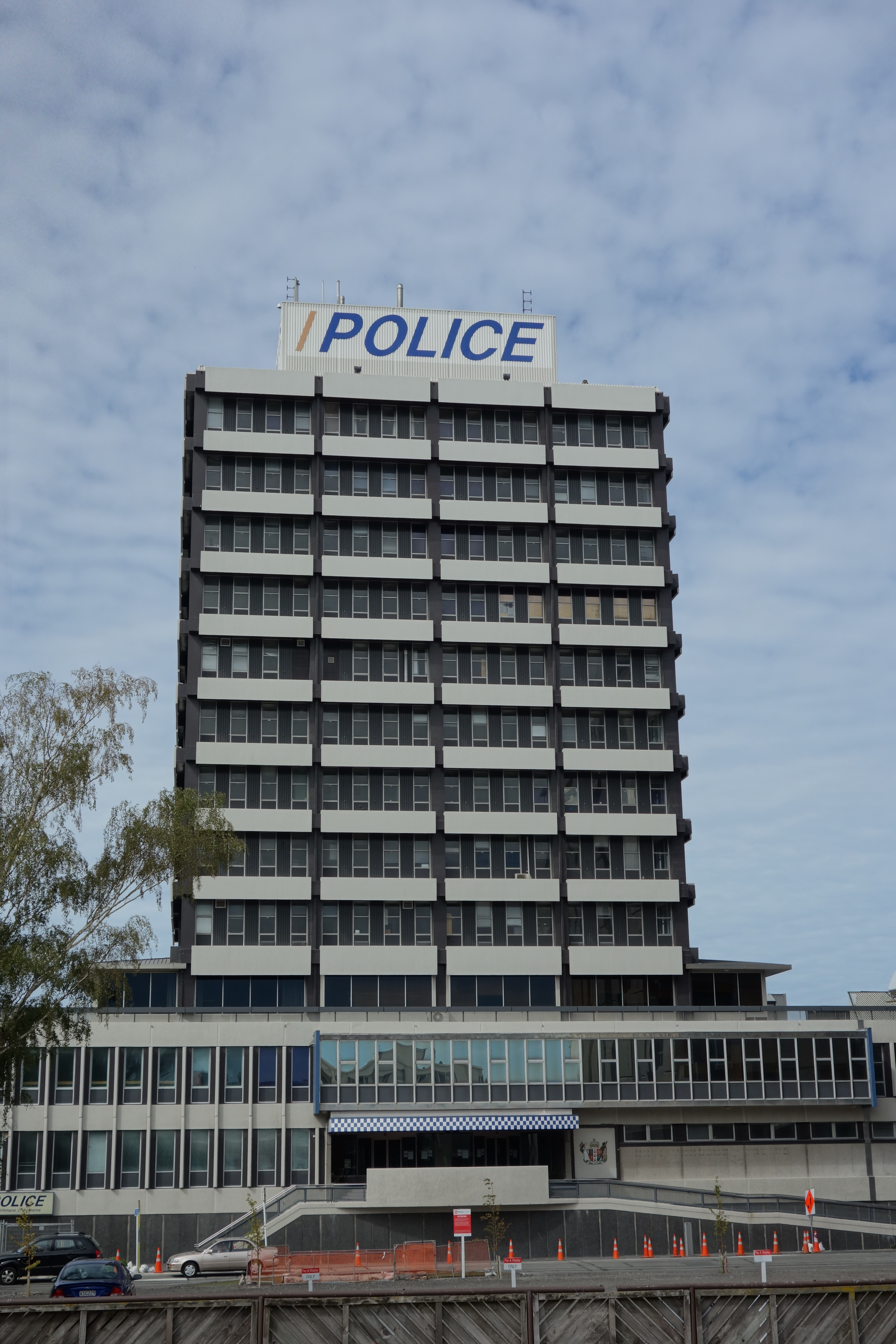
Christchurch Central Police Station in February 2013

- 31 May – The Christchurch Central Police Station is demolished by implosion.

=== June ===
- Offices connected to Alan Reay, who was involved in the construction of the CTV Building, are raided by police to find documents for an investigation on the building's collapse.

=== November ===
- 27 February – The 5000th repair to social housing is completed, several weeks ahead of schedule.

=== December ===
- 19 December – The Christchurch Art Gallery reopens.
- 22 December – The new Margaret Mahy Playground opens.

== 2016 ==
=== February ===
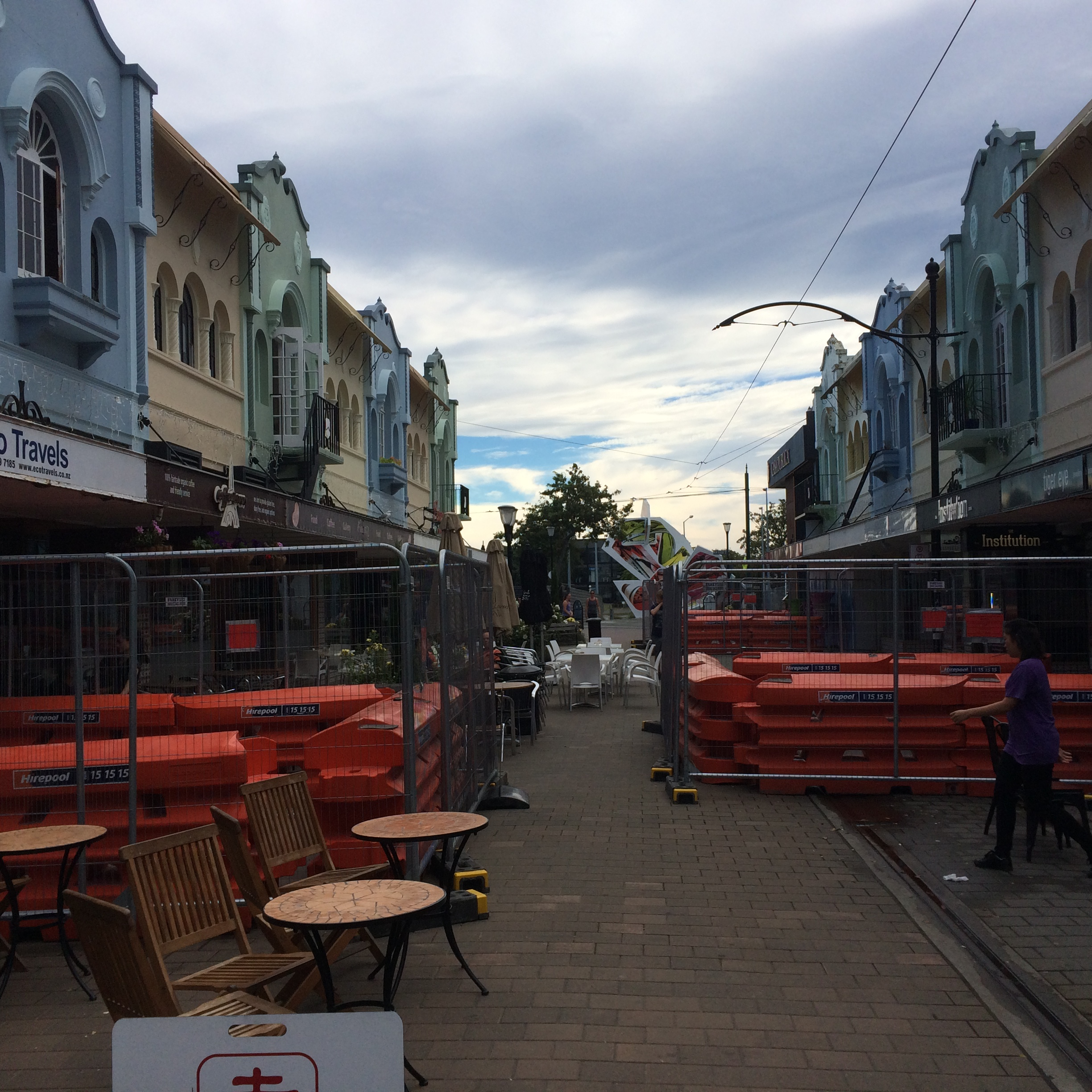
Parts of New Regent Street were cordoned off following the earthquake on 14 February.

- 14 February
  - 1:13 pm – A magnitude 5.7 earthquake occurs, which often referred to the Valentine's Day earthquake.
  - The National Crisis Management Centre is activated and soon stood down.

=== April ===
- 5 April – After originally being scheduled to close in June 2016, the Canterbury Skills and Employment Hub's closure is extended to June 2018.
- 18 April – The Canterbury Earthquake Recovery Authority is disestablished.
- 19 April – The Canterbury Earthquake Recovery Act 2011 is repealed by the Greater Christchurch Regeneration Act 2016.
- 25 April (Anzac Day) – The Bridge of Remembrance is re-opened and re-dedicated.

=== May ===
- 2 May – Trams return to New Regent Street after they stopped operating in the area due to the Valentine's Day earthquake.
- 30 May – It is announced that $168 million will be allocated to the Christchurch Rebuild Schools programme, as part of the 2016 New Zealand budget.

=== June ===
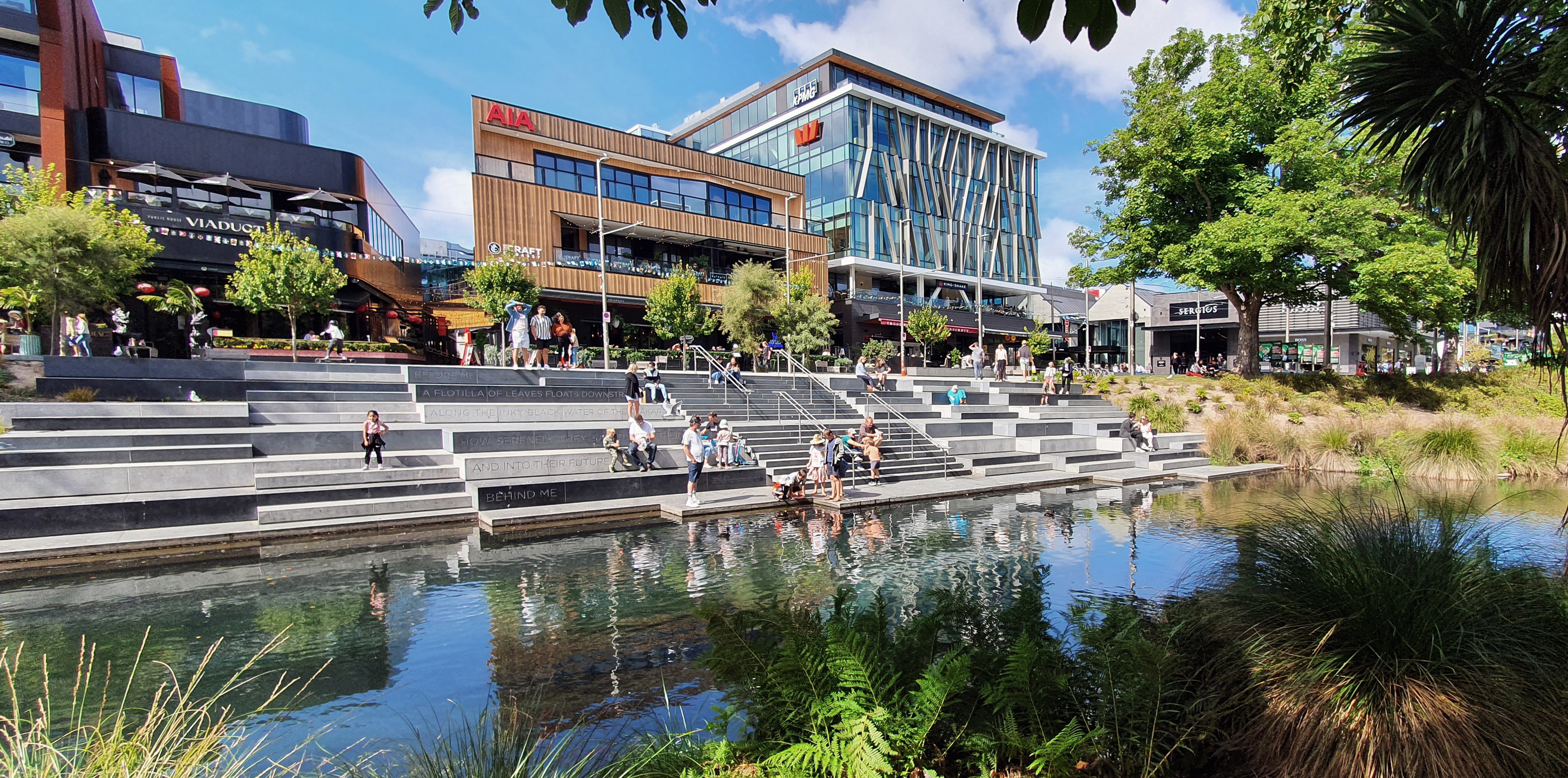
The Terraces in 2022

- 23 June – John Key opens the first stage of The Terraces.

=== November ===
- 14 November – The unrelated 7.8 M_{w} Kaikōura earthquake occurs, which causes further damage to Canterbury.
- 29 November – The MBIE releases Rockfall: Design considerations for passive protection structures.

=== December ===
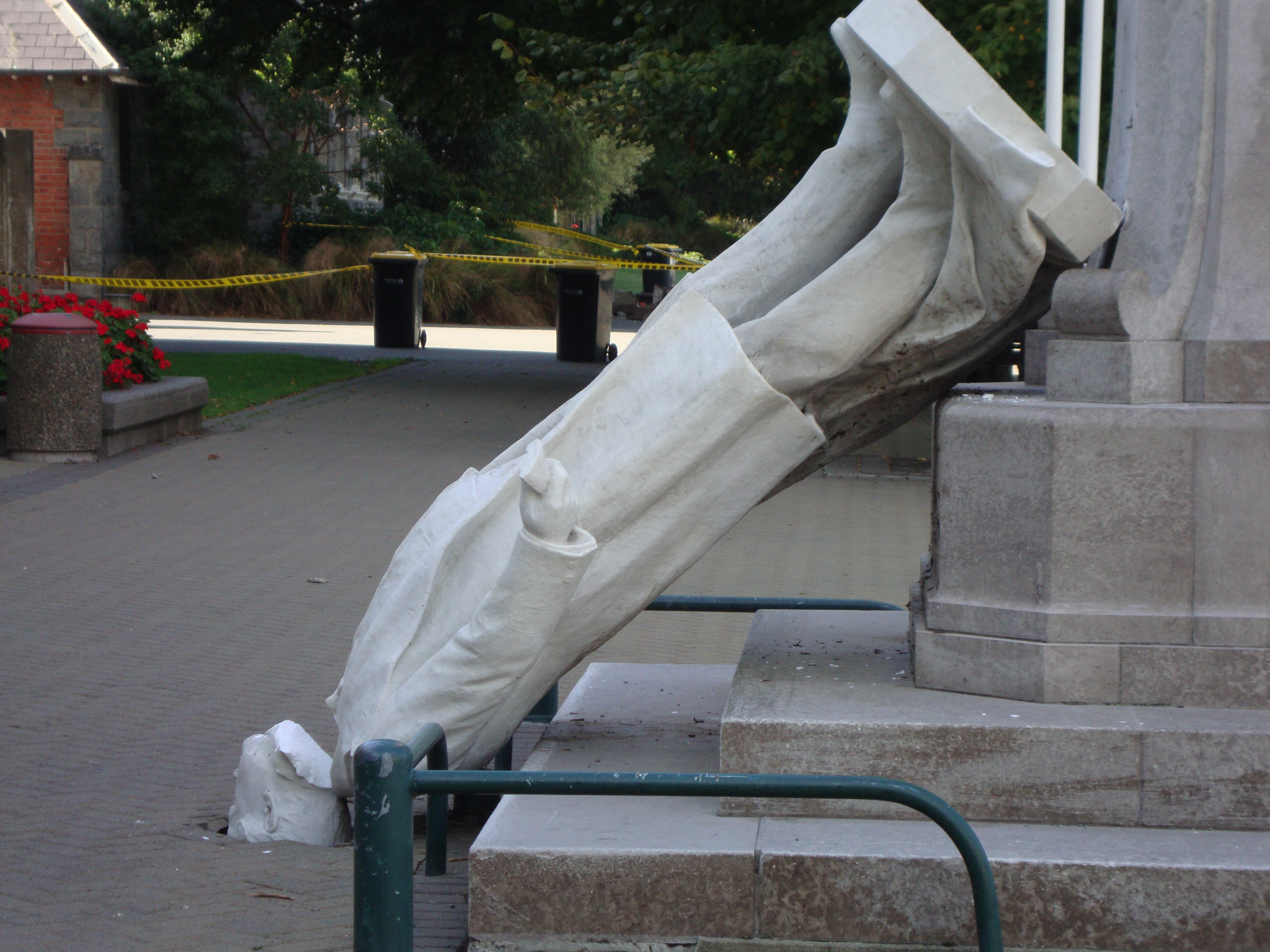
The Rolleston Statue in February 2011

- 21 December – The Statue of William Rolleston is unveiled after being toppled in the 2011 earthquake.

== 2017 ==
=== January ===
- 18 January – It is announced that 20 of Rawhiti Domain's temporary houses will be able to be sold to and relocated by farmers affected by the 2016 Kaikōura earthquake.
- 23 January – Sign of the Kiwi reopens.

=== February ===
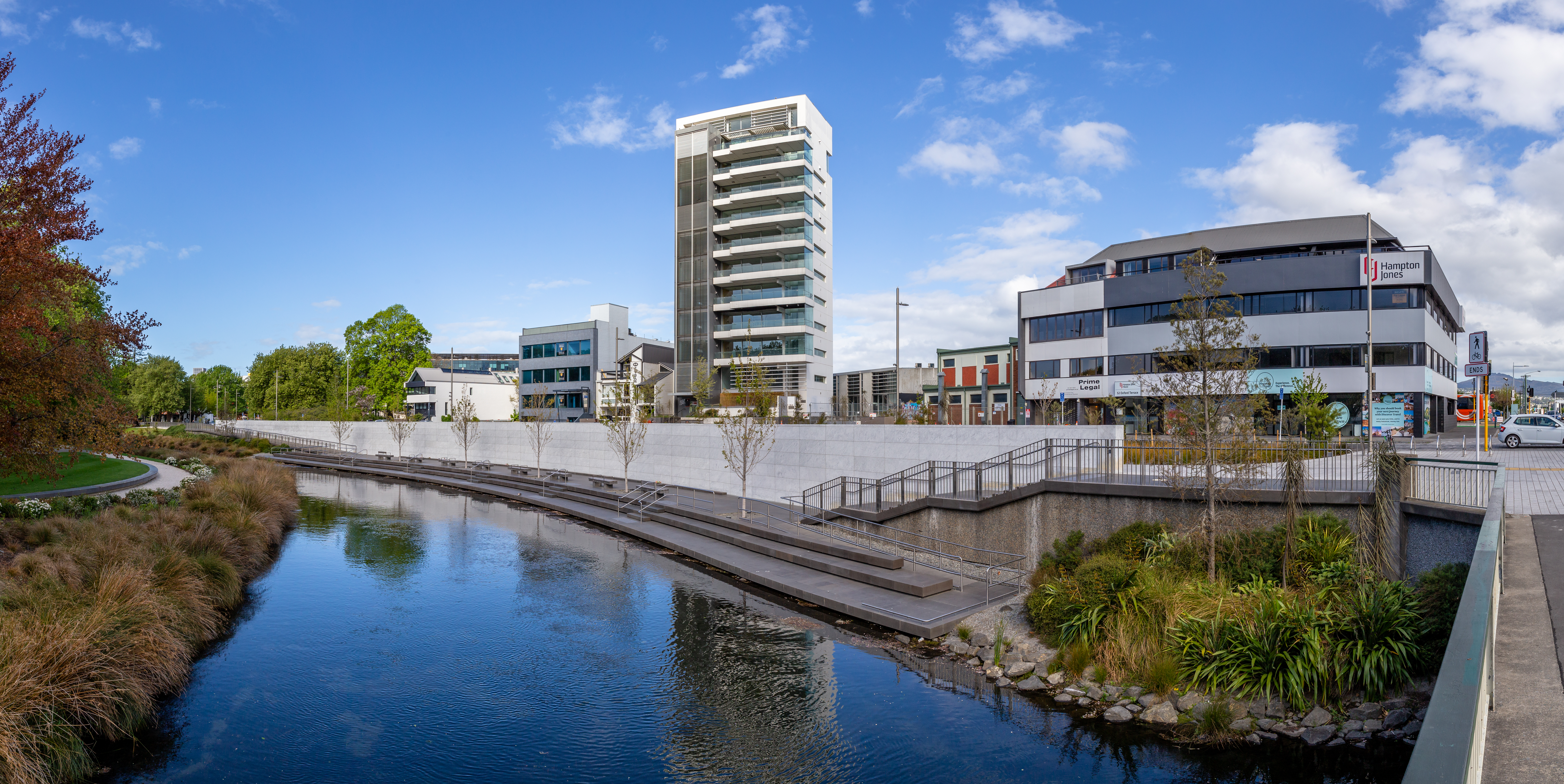
Canterbury Earthquake National Memorial

- February – The MBIE releases its Responses to the Canterbury Earthquakes Royal Commission recommendations final report.
- 19 February – St Barnabas Church reopens after restorations.
- 22 February – The Canterbury Earthquake National Memorial opens.

=== March ===
- March – The rebuild of Opawa Community Church is finished.
- 27 March – The city council decides to demolish Lancaster Park Stadium.

=== April ===
- 24 April – Gerry Brownlee resigns from his portfolio of Minister for Supporting Greater Christchurch Regeneration.
- 30 April – The Christchurch City Council buys the 42 temporary houses in Linwood Park from the Ministry of Business, Innovation and Employment. It subsequently gifts these to the Ōtautahi Community Housing Trust.

=== May ===
- 17 May – The site of the temporary village in Kaiapoi Domain is handed back to the Waimakariri District Council.

=== June ===
- The demolition rubble of Sydenham Heritage Church, which had been laying in its place since 2011, starts to be removed.

=== July ===
- 1 July – The Forsyth Barr Building reopens with the new Crowne Plaza hotel.
- 5 July – A blessing ceremony is held to mark the beginning of onsite work on the Lyttelton Timeball Station.
- 25 July – After about two years of repairwork, the Rose Historic Chapel reopens.
- 30 July – The government publishes its report Lessons from the Canterbury earthquake sequence.

=== August ===
- 1 August – The Crowne Plaza Hotel reopens for booking.

=== September ===
- 9 September – The synod of Christ Church Cathedral vote to restore the cathedral.
- September – Restoration starts on the Nurses' Memorial Chapel.

=== October ===
- 6 October – The Statue of Robert Falcon Scott is unveiled after being toppled in the 2011 earthquake.

=== November ===
- 30 November – It is announced that the Police will not prosecute anyone who was involved in the construction of the CTV Building.

== 2018 ==
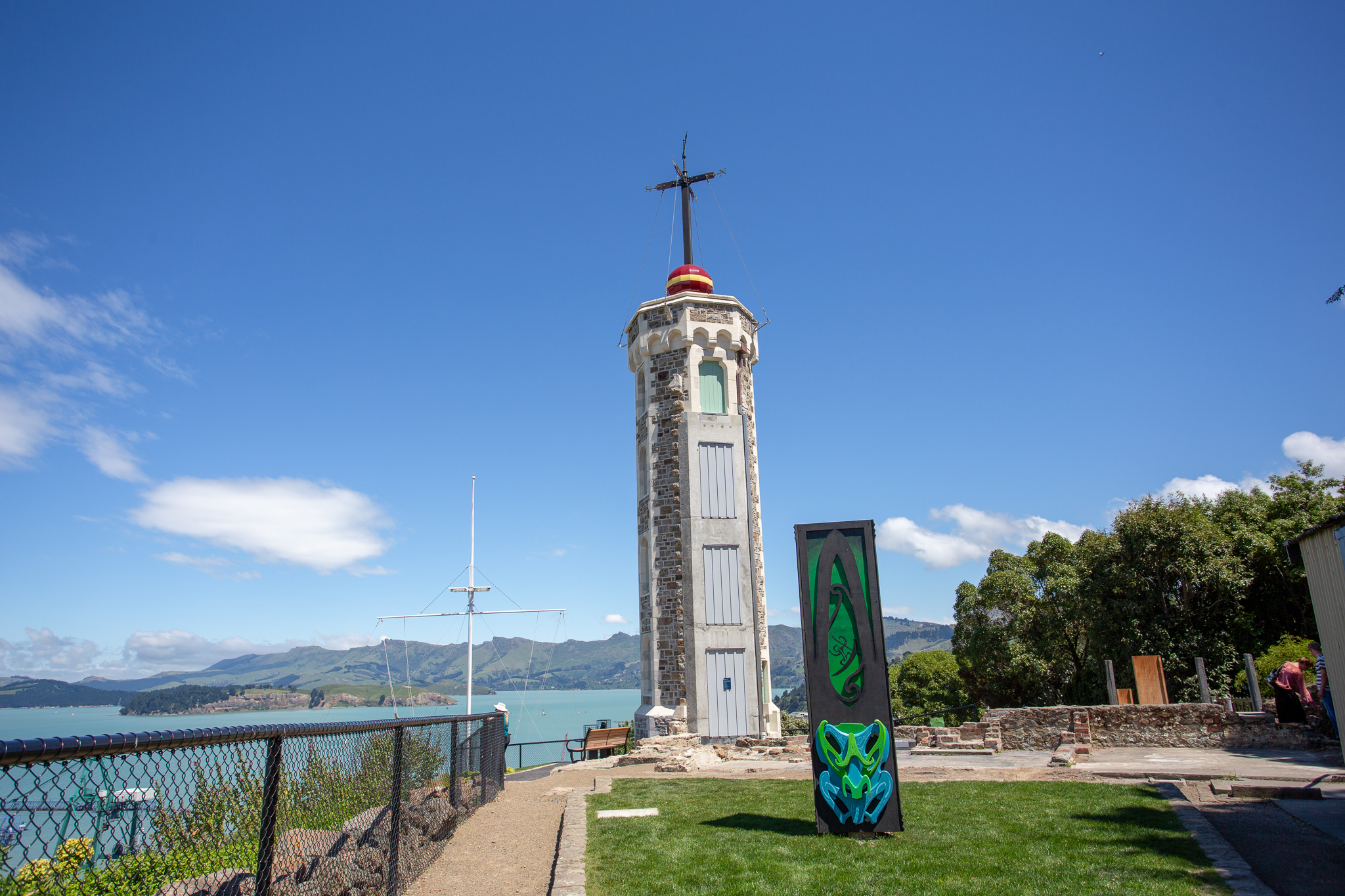
Lyttelton Timeball Station in November 2018, with the foundations of the former building visible on the right

- 31 January – The container mall, originally named Re:START, closes.
- March – The Distinction Hotel opens in the Millenium Building after the Millenium hotel did not reopen.
- 22 August – A joint venture agreement is signed to reinstate Christ Church Cathedral.
- 12 October – Tūranga, the replacement of the demolished Christchurch Central Library, opens.
- 27 October – The Nurses' Memorial Chapel is reopened.
- 2 November – The Lyttelton Timeball Station is reopened.

== 2019 ==
- 24 February – The first part of the Christchurch Town Hall reopens after restoration.
- 8 March – Ngā Puna Wai Sports Hub is officially opened and functions as a replacement for several sport facilities that were demolished following the earthquakes.
- 23 April – Minister for Greater Christchurch Regeneration Megan Woods announces the approval of the plans to turn the residential red zone in the Ōtākaro Avon River Corridor into a green corridor park.
- 26 April – Prince William pays his respects to the Canterbury Earthquake National Memorial.
- 30 April – A court decision concludes a long insurance dispute, allowing Emmons Developments to access up to $190 million in insurance cover to fund the restoration, rebuild and demolition of three buildings: the old Rydges Hotel, the then-demolished Grant Thornton Building and a car park.
- 4 August – It is announced that the Cathedral of the Blessed Sacrament will be demolished.
- 15 August – A grant is announced for owners of on-sold homes without private insurance access with over $100,000 in earthquake damage.
- 10 September – Demolition of Lancaster Park Stadium is announced as almost finished, with expectations to finish by December.
- 22 September – The Sign of the Takahe reopens.
- September – The rebuild of Opawa Public Library starts.

== 2020s ==
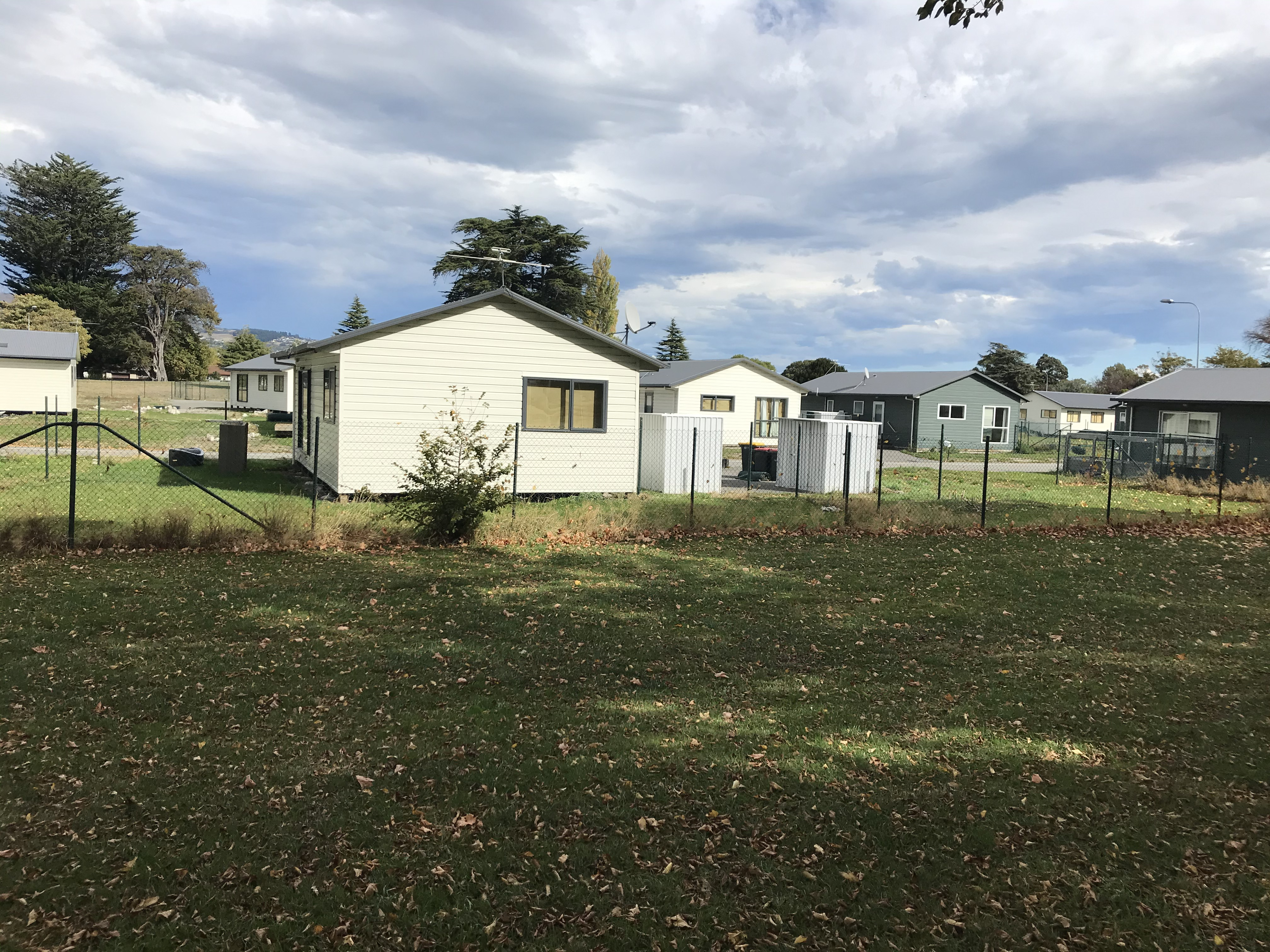
Linwood Park's temporary housing in 2020

- 2020 – A 2018 study is published in the journal Earthquake Spectra, suggesting that ground shaking from the 2010 Darfield earthquake caused a death.
- February 2020 – The temporary housing in Linwood Park starts being removed.
- 23 February 2020 – Christchurch mayor Lianne Dalziel formally apologises for the council allowing dangerous buildings to be built and quake-damaged buildings to remain standing, particularly the CTV Building.
- 27 February 2020 – In Toyama, Japan, mayor Dalziel apologises to the families of the Japanese people who died in the CTV Building.
- August 2020 – Environment Canterbury buys Odeon Theatre.
- 1 September 2020 – The demolition of the Cathedral of the Blessed Sacrament begins.
- 4 September 2020 – The last temporary house in Linwood Park is removed.
- October 2020 – Applications for the On-sold Support Package close.
- 22 February 2021 – An online exhibition of the Christchurch City Council Libraries' digital heritage collection is run for the 10th anniversary of the earthquake, which includes photos that the public had not seen before.
- 28 February 2021 – St Peter's Church in Riccarton reopens.
- October 2021 – The last demolition in the residential red zone is completed.
- 17 December 2021 – Te Pae Christchurch Convention Centre, a replacement of the demolished Christchurch Convention Centre, officially opens. The public will get access on 13 February.
- May 2022 – The replacement Medway Street footbridge, which was twisted in the September earthquake, opens.
- 16 August 2022 – People legally enter Christ Church Cathedral for the first time since the earthquakes. Urban explorers had already entered the building beforehand.
- 3 March 2023 – The Christchurch Schools Rebuild programme is given another $301 million, which increases the total investment to $1.6 billion.
- 1 April 2023 – The 185 empty chairs memorial is dismantled by the public at the request of its creator.
- 6 May 2023 – The public is allowed into the Canterbury Provincial Council Buildings for the first time since the earthquakes.
- December 2023 – Demolition begins on the old Rydges Hotel and empty shops adjoining it.
- January 2024 – Shipping containers are finished being removed from Odeon Theatre, after being there for over a decade.
- 19 February 2024 – Demolition begins on the car park at the back of Rydges Hotel.
- April 2024 – Scaffolding is removed from the Municipal Chambers.
- 9 August 2024 – The government decides that it will no longer fund the rebuild of the Christ Church Cathedral, which is in a funding shortfall.
- 25 September 2024 – The Engineering New Zealand Disciplinary Committee upholds a complaint against senior engineer Alan Reay for inadequately supervising the construction of the CTV Building.
- November 2024 – Due to rising costs, the payout criteria for the On-sold Support Package is made stricter.
- 17 December 2024 – Music is played in Christ Church Cathedral to visitors for the first time since the earthquakes.
- 3 May 2025 – The new Court Theatre building opens in the Performing Arts Precinct.
- 25 June 2025 – Environment Canterbury decides to sell Odean Theatre.
- February 2026 – The disestablishment of Gap Filler begins, with surplus assets being given to Life in Vacant Spaces Charitable Trust.
- April 2026 – Construction on the $130 million 'Downtown' precinct with 18 buildings begins.
- July 2026 – Plans for the rebuild of the demolished Cathedral of the Blessed Sacrament are revealed.

== Predicted and scheduled ==
- March 2025 – Demolition of the South Library is expected to begin.
