= 2016 Christchurch earthquake =

Earthquake in New Zealand

2016 Valentine's Day earthquake
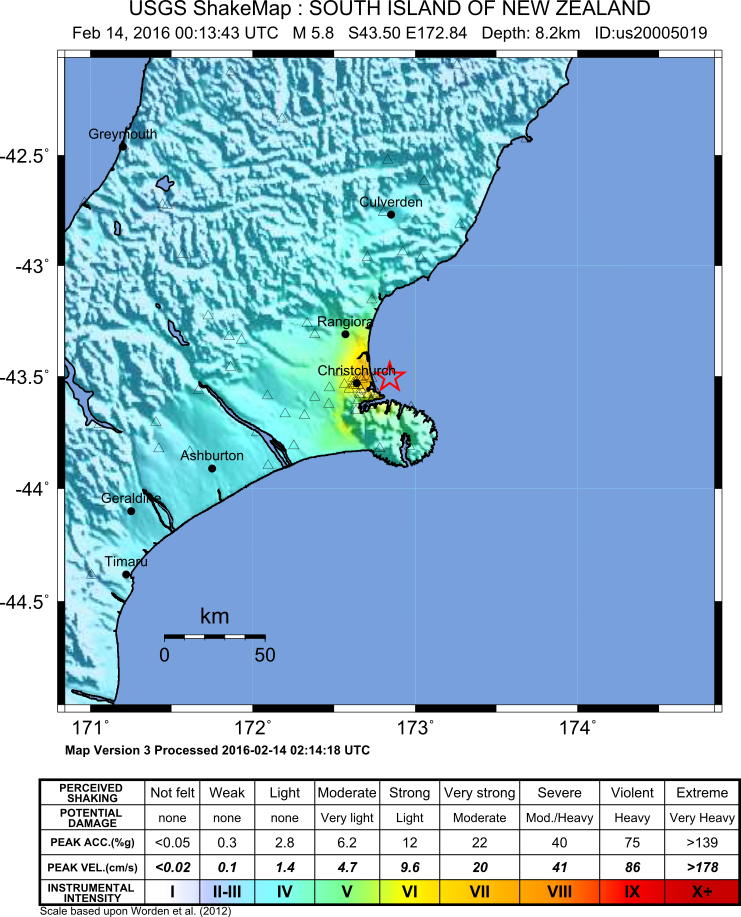
- Map of the earthquake and its intensity

- Location within New Zealand
- UTC time: 2016-02-14 00:13:44
- ISC event: 608330826
- USGS-ANSS: ComCat
- Local date: 14 February 2016
- Local time: 01:13 PM NZDT (UTC+13:00)
- Magnitude: 5.7 M_{L}
- Depth: 8 km (5 mi)
- Epicentre: 43.50°S 172.83°E
- Type: Strike-slip
- Areas affected: New Zealand
- Total damage: Building collapse, power outages, rockfall, sinkhole
- Max. intensity: MMI VIII (Severe)
- Peak acceleration: 0.4 g
- Tsunami: No

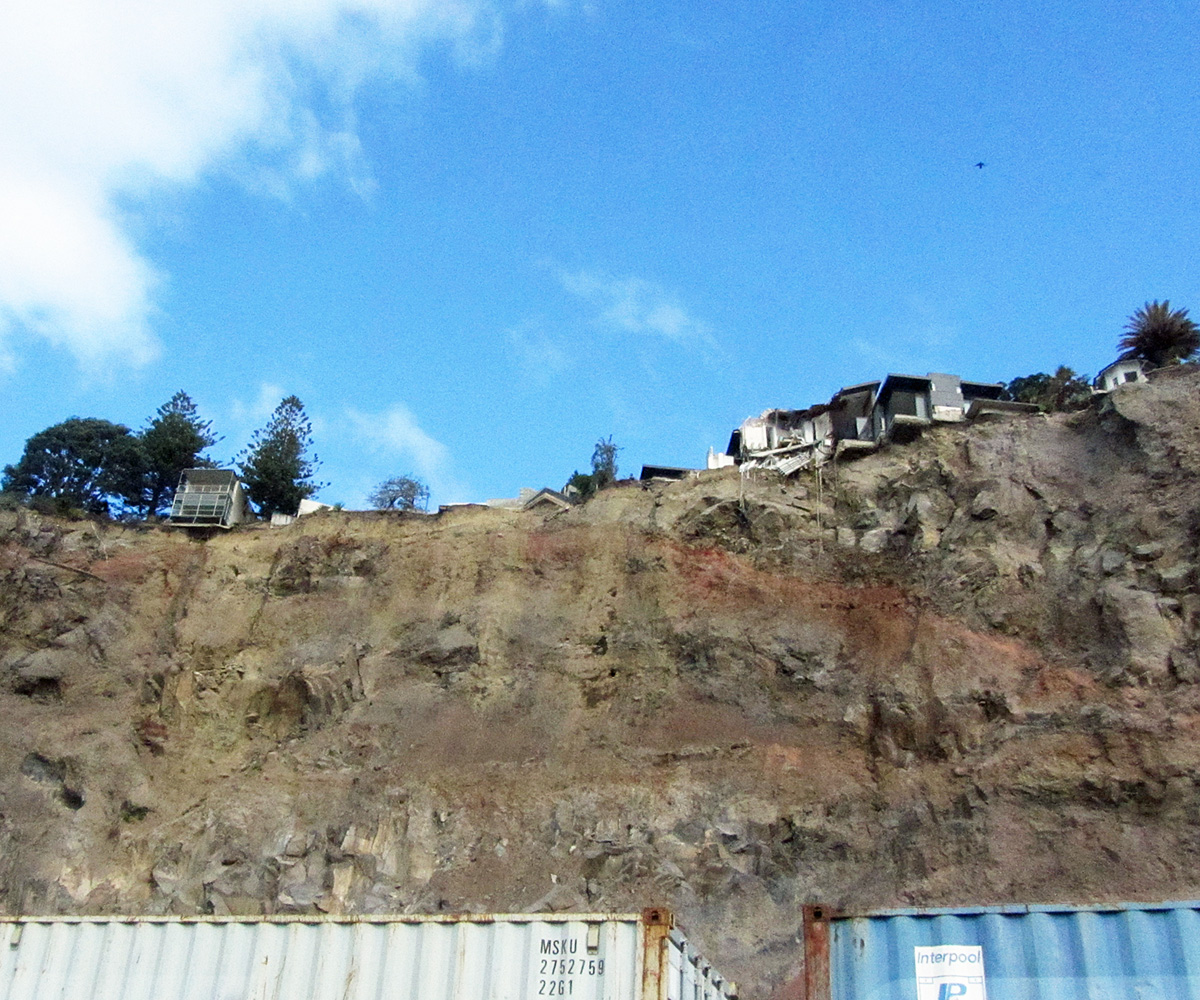
The cliffs of Peacock's Gallop were separated from the road to Sumner by shipping containers stacked two high (photo 2012).

An earthquake occurred in Christchurch on 14 February 2016 at 1:13 p.m. local time (00:13 UTC) and initially recorded as 5.9 on the Richter scale, but subsequently reviewed as 5.7. Often referred to as the Valentine's Day earthquake, it was centred in the sea off New Brighton at a depth of 15 kilometres (9.3 mi). It was the first large earthquake that the Christchurch area had experienced since May 2012, and it was part of the earthquake sequence that started with the 4 September 2010 Canterbury earthquake.

A number of cliffs collapsed at Scarborough (Godley Head and Whitewash Head), Richmond Hill, and Sumner (Peacock's Gallop). The shipping containers that were still placed along Peacock's Gallop on Main Road stopped falling rocks from hitting passing cyclists. Two surfers were below Whitewash Head and had car-size rocks crash into the sea around them.

== Impact ==
Westfield Riccarton, Eastgate Mall, The Palms, and Ballantynes were evacuated and closed for engineering inspection. There was confusion at Northlands Shopping Centre as police encouraged some shopkeepers to evacuate, but the alarm was not sounded as is otherwise done when the mall is to be cleared. Some shop keepers were told by mall management staff that there would be financial penalties if they did not keep their shop open. Nearly 50 shops in the mall closed, partially due to the fact that stock had fallen out of shelves and into the aisles. On the Saturday after the earthquake, The Press in its editorial was very critical of mall management, stating that "management's response to the entire incident profoundly and completely misses the point". Shortly after the earthquakes, it was found that seven of the forty historic façades in the central city's New Regent Street were unstable. The buildings were cordoned off, and that stopped the heritage tram from running, which had a major impact on those businesses that remained open. The tram started operating again in May 2016.

Liquefaction occurred in Bexley, Parklands, and New Brighton. Power was lost to around 500 houses. The CoCA Art Gallery, which had opened for the first time since the 2011 Christchurch earthquake on 13 February 2016, the day prior to this earthquake, was closed again. Little structural damage has been reported in the Christchurch Central City. There were no reports of serious injury, and St. John Ambulance deactivated its emergency operations centre later in the day. The National Crisis Management Centre in Wellington was also stood down, with the emergency response to be managed by Christchurch City Council. Some tracks in the Port Hills were closed due to rockfall, including Rāpaki Track and the Bridle Path.

Psychologists argued that survivors of the 2011 Christchurch earthquake, especially those who lost their homes or friends, experience painful memories during aftershocks. The Canterbury District Health Board (CDHB) had sought additional funding for mental health since shortly after the February 2011 earthquake. Despite the proven need of the area, the Ministry of Health proposed to further cut the mental health budget of the CDHB while on average, other district health boards were to receive increased funding; this information was revealed two days after the Valentine's Day earthquake. Responding with an editorial, The Press called the situation "both disgraceful and distressing" and challenged the health minister, Jonathan Coleman, to come to Canterbury and see for himself. In early March, Coleman announced that officials were working on a package that would assign millions in additional funding to Canterbury for mental health. Coleman cited the February 2016 as the reason for the additional funding:

As soon as the Valentine's Day quake hit I was sitting up in Auckland and thought, this is going to be big in terms of the health sector.

Christchurch mayor Lianne Dalziel talked about her reaction to the Valentine's Day earthquake:

You know, it was a shock. I haven't been proud to admit to everyone that I did scream. I didn't expect to be shocked by an earthquake. I actually got so used to them that I don't mind them ... but this one came from nowhere.

The Earthquake Commission received almost 14,000 damage claims.

== See also ==
- Geology of Canterbury, New Zealand
- List of earthquakes in New Zealand
- Timeline of the Canterbury earthquakes

=== Similar earthquakes ===
- December 2010 Christchurch earthquake
- June 2011 Christchurch earthquake
