= National Crisis Management Centre =

New Zealand government centre

General information
- Location: Wellington, New Zealand
- Coordinates: 41.2784°S 174.7767°E
- Opened: 1972 (54 years ago)
- Governing body: National Emergency Management Agency

The National Crisis Management Centre (NCMC), also known as the Beehive Bunker, is the New Zealand government crisis management command centre situated under the Beehive government building in Wellington.

The centre is designed to be self-sufficient in the event of a disaster. It is designed to withstand earthquakes rated 'Intense' (X) on the Modified Mercalli scale, and is maintained by the National Emergency Management Agency to be always ready for an emergency. It has emergency electricity, water and food supplies; security systems, etc. It also has sleeping accommodation, first aid facilities and a cafeteria with a feeding capacity of 100 people.

== History ==
The National Crisis Management Centre opened in 1972.

An Alternative National Crisis Management Centre was established in Auckland following the 2016 Kaikōura earthquake. It is intended to be activated if the facility in Wellington was damaged, in the event of a wide-spread emergency or if the national government has been forced to relocate to Auckland. The 2024 Report of the Government Inquiry into the Response to the North Island Severe Weather Events described the Auckland facility as "totally inadequate", and the Wellington one "not fit for purpose." A new centre under the Beehive is expected to be built by 2026; it has been given budget of $10.6 million. In 2024 deputy chief executive and director for the National Emergency Management Agency (NEMA) John Price said that for an emergency of the scale of an Alpine Fault earthquake, there would need to be 350 people to manage the disaster, but the facility can only house 120 people.

== Activations ==
The centre was activated following the 2007 Gisborne earthquake, the September 2010 Canterbury, February 2011 June 2011, December 2011 and the February 2016 Christchurch earthquakes. It was also activated in April 2011 after flooding in the Hawke's Bay and in December 2011 after flooding in Nelson Tasman, for 2015's Cyclone Pam, and in 2020 due to the COVID-19 pandemic.
