= Majestic Theatre, Christchurch =

Former Art Deco cinema in Christchurch

Majestic Theatre
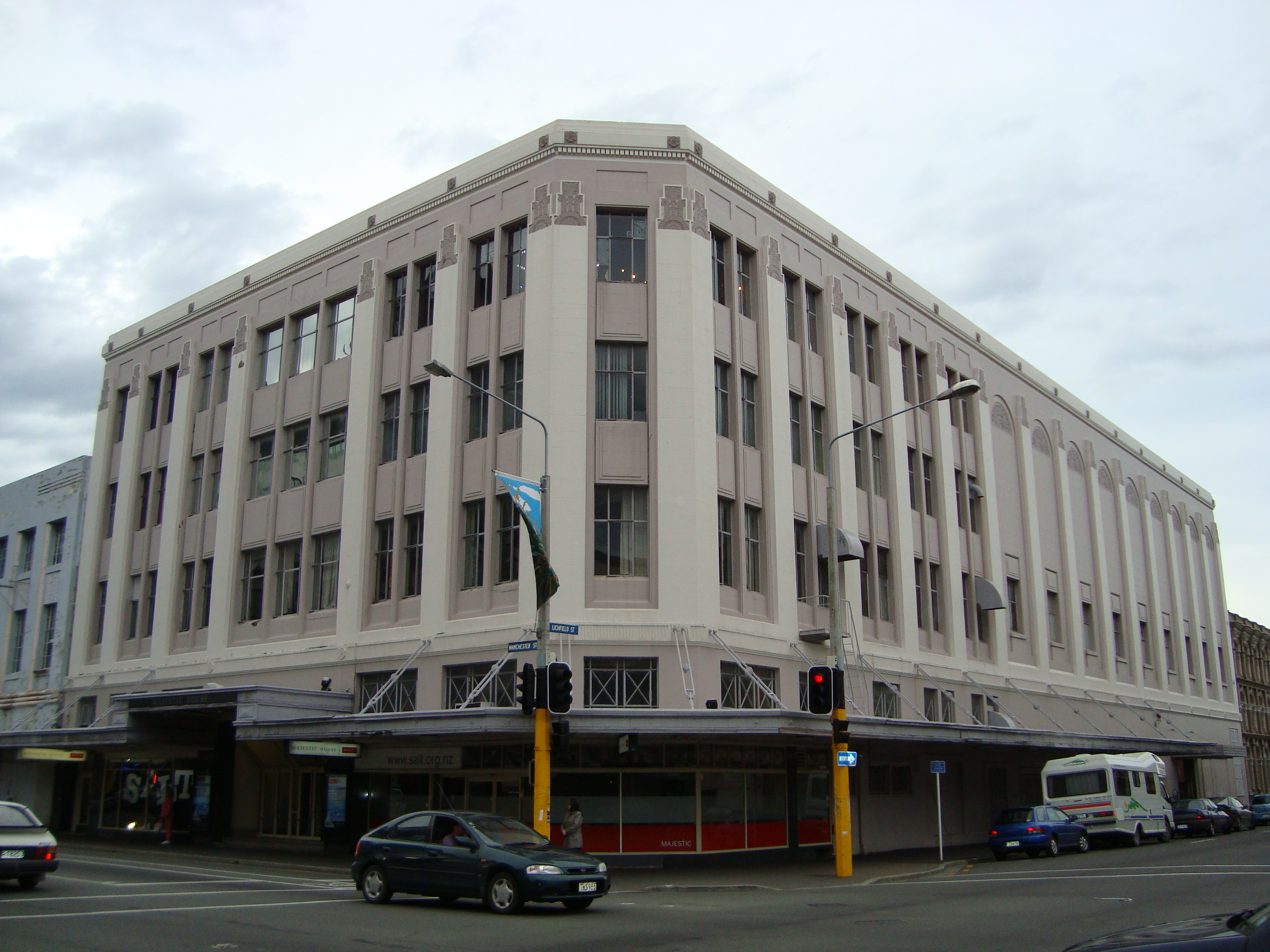
- Majestic Theatre in August 2008
- Interactive map of the Majestic Theatre area
- Alternative names: Majestic House, Majestic Church

General information
- Status: Demolished
- Architectural style: Art Deco
- Location: Christchurch Central, New Zealand, 124–126 Manchester Street, Christchurch Central
- Coordinates: 43.5339°S 172.6400°E
- Year built: Late 1920s
- Completed: Early 1930
- Opened: 1 March 1930
- Renovated: 1946
- Demolished: May 2014
- Cost: £NZ45000–60000

Design and construction
- Architecture firm: Sidney and Alfred Luttrell
- Main contractor: P. Graham and Son

Renovating team
- Architect: Harry Francis Willis
- Main contractor: J. and W. Jamieson Limited

Majestic Theatre was an Art Deco cinema building in Christchurch, New Zealand. Majestic Theatre opened on 1 March 1930, and for almost 40 years, operated as a cinema and theatre venue. Designed by the architectural firm of Sidney and Alfred Luttrell in the late 1920s, it was the final project in the Majestic Theatre programme, which saw several cinemas built across New Zealand.

Majestic Theatre opened as the largest cinema in the city, and was the first building in Christchurch to be built with a complete steel frame. It housed a two-tier auditorium with 1650 seats, and also featured office space (originally tenanted by the Department of Labour) and shops on the ground floor. In 1946, shortly after being acquired by Sir Robert Kerridge, the building was damaged in a fire, and underwent renovations overseen by architect Harry Francis Willis.

Following the growth of television in New Zealand in the 1960s, which impacted cinema ticket sales, Majestic Theatre utilised its large space to increasingly host stage performances. Notable performers included The Beatles, The Kinks, Manfred Mann and The Dave Clark Five, as well as successful long-running shows such as Startime Spectacular.

In August 1970, Majestic Theatre officially closed following a second fire started in the dress circle. It was remodelled into a nightclub named Moby Dick’s Nite Spot, which operated until the mid-1970s when a third fire damaged the venue. The building was acquired by the Christchurch Revival Fellowship and reopened in 1978, and became known as Majestic Church in its later years.

Majestic Theatre incurred moderate damage in the 2011 Christchurch earthquake and was immediately closed. As a Category 2 scheduled heritage building, heritage advocates and members of the Christchurch City Council argued the building should be saved. However, in a controversial decision, the CCDU department of the Canterbury Earthquake Recovery Authority (CERA) decided to demolish the building as part of their central city rebuild plan. Small protests and campaigns were held in attempt to save the building, but demolition went ahead in May 2014.

== Design and construction ==
Majestic Theatre was designed for Sir Benjamin Fuller of John Fuller & Sons Ltd., by the architectural firm of the late Australian brothers Sidney and Alfred Luttrell. The firm's design work had largely been passed to Jack Hollis and Allan Manson following the death of Alfred in 1924. The building was designed in Art Deco style, influenced by Chicago skyscraper design. The original design featured a three-tiered auditorium with 4000 seats, but the final version was two-tiers with 1650 seats. The entrances had swinging glass doors surrounded by extensive use of granite, and a luxury interior design inspired by Hispano-Moresque tradition.

Majestic Theatre was the final project as part of the Majestic Theatre programme, and was modelled on Majestic Theatre, Auckland (1925–1961). In addition to the cinema, the building also had office space, with a separate entrance on Manchester Street, and ground floor shops. It was the first building in Christchurch to be built with a complete steel frame, weighing 380 tonnes, and surrounded by ferro-concrete. The building was constructed on 124–126 Manchester Street by P. Graham and Son, completed in early 1930. The construction cost was estimated between £NZ45000–60000.

== History ==
Majestic Theatre officially opened on 1 March 1930 by Mayor John Kendrick Archer, becoming the largest cinema in the city. The office space was first tenanted to the Department of Labour, with the rest of the building leased by Christchurch Cinemas Limited. The first screening was the film Welcome Danger (1929).

In 1946, Christchurch Cinemas Limited was sold to Sir Robert Kerridge. That same year, the building was damaged in a fire. It was renovated in a project undertaken by architect Harry Francis Willis and soon reopened. However, both Willis and J. and W. Jamieson Limited were fined for altering the building without a permit. The renovation was also criticised by the Christchurch Returned Services' Association for its heavy use of plaster, during a time when housing projects were delayed due to the shortage of the material.

Majestic Theatre began holding stage performances from 1954. This was particularly important during the 1960s, in response to the growth of television impacting cinema attendance. The theatre saw success with the Startime Spectacular music shows in the 1960s, and held notable shows by artists including The Beatles, The Kinks, Manfred Mann and The Dave Clark Five.

On 28 August 1970, Majestic Theatre permanently closed as a cinema and theatre venue, following a second fire which started in the dress circle. It was purchased on 16 October 1972 by Demeter Holdings Limited. In 1973, Standby Enterprises acquired a leasehold and remodelled Majestic Theatre into a nightclub named Moby Dick’s Nite Spot. The nightclub featured a discotheque, dining area, and games room. On 5 July 1975, the building was damaged in another fire caused by a cleaner, Adrian Neal Bolt. Standby Enterprises was liquidated the following year, unable to claim insurance.

In 1976, the Christchurch Revival Fellowship purchased the building and restored it, opening it in 1978 as the City New Life Centre. The new venue operated as a church and had a reduced capacity of 1100 seats. In its later years, it was known as Majestic Church. The organisation had intended to complete further restoration in the late 2000s.

In February 2011, Majestic Theatre was damaged in the Christchurch Earthquake and was permanently closed.

== Demolition ==
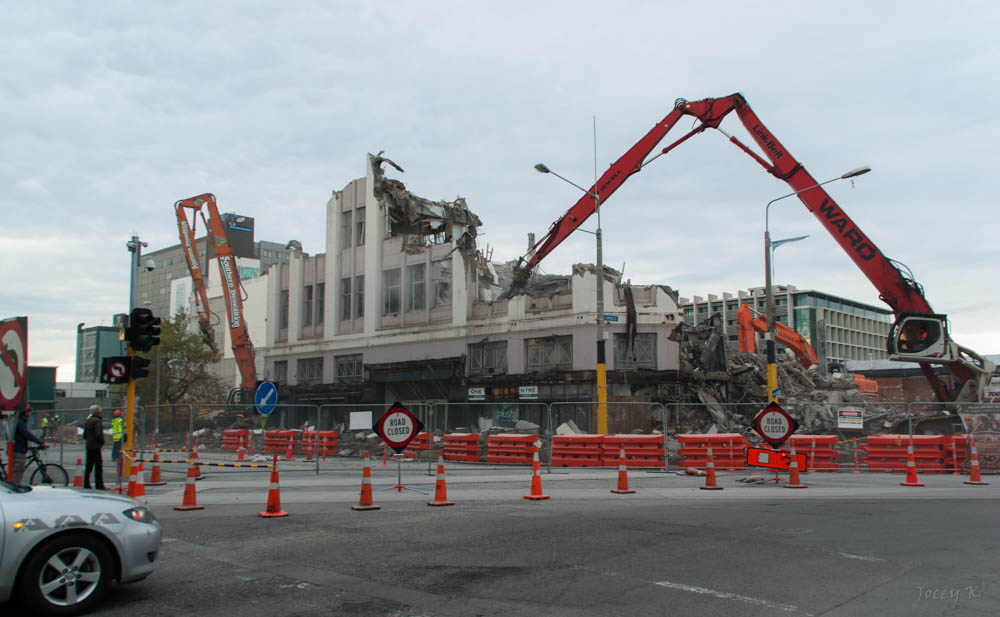
Demolition of Majestic Theatre, 18 May 2014

Majestic Theatre incurred moderate damage in the 2011 Christchurch Earthquake. The damage was deemed repairable. As a Group 2 scheduled heritage building, heritage advocates and members of the public argued that the building should be saved. Historic Places Canterbury requested a pause on plans to demolish the building by the Canterbury Earthquake Recovery Authortiy (CERA), so that an engineering report could be conducted.

An organisation named Save The Majestic was formed to campaign against demolition plans. Some small protests were held outside of the theatre and the group planned to take legal action, believing the building was being sacrificed so that Manchester Street could be widened as part of the eastern frame plan.

In December 2013, the Christchurch City Council vowed it would save the building and would meet with the Canterbury Earthquake Recovery Authortiy (CERA) to discuss it. However, the Christchurch Central Development Unit, tasked with selecting projects to demolish in the inner city, issued a section 38 notice and went ahead with the demolition, which took place in May 2014. The decision was signed off by Warwick Isaacs who led the department, prompting public criticism.

In response to the criticism of his approach to heritage buildings in general, Isaacs stated he found the heritage issue "challenging" but that his focus was to keep the rebuild moving. In a retrospective investigation by Stuff in 2021, Isaacs refused to comment. Baden Ewart, who was CERA director of planning and worked closely with Isaacs, stated that buildings were demolished as they were a safety risk, and in many cases, the owners did not have the finances to save them.
