= Warwick Isaacs =

New Zealand chief executive

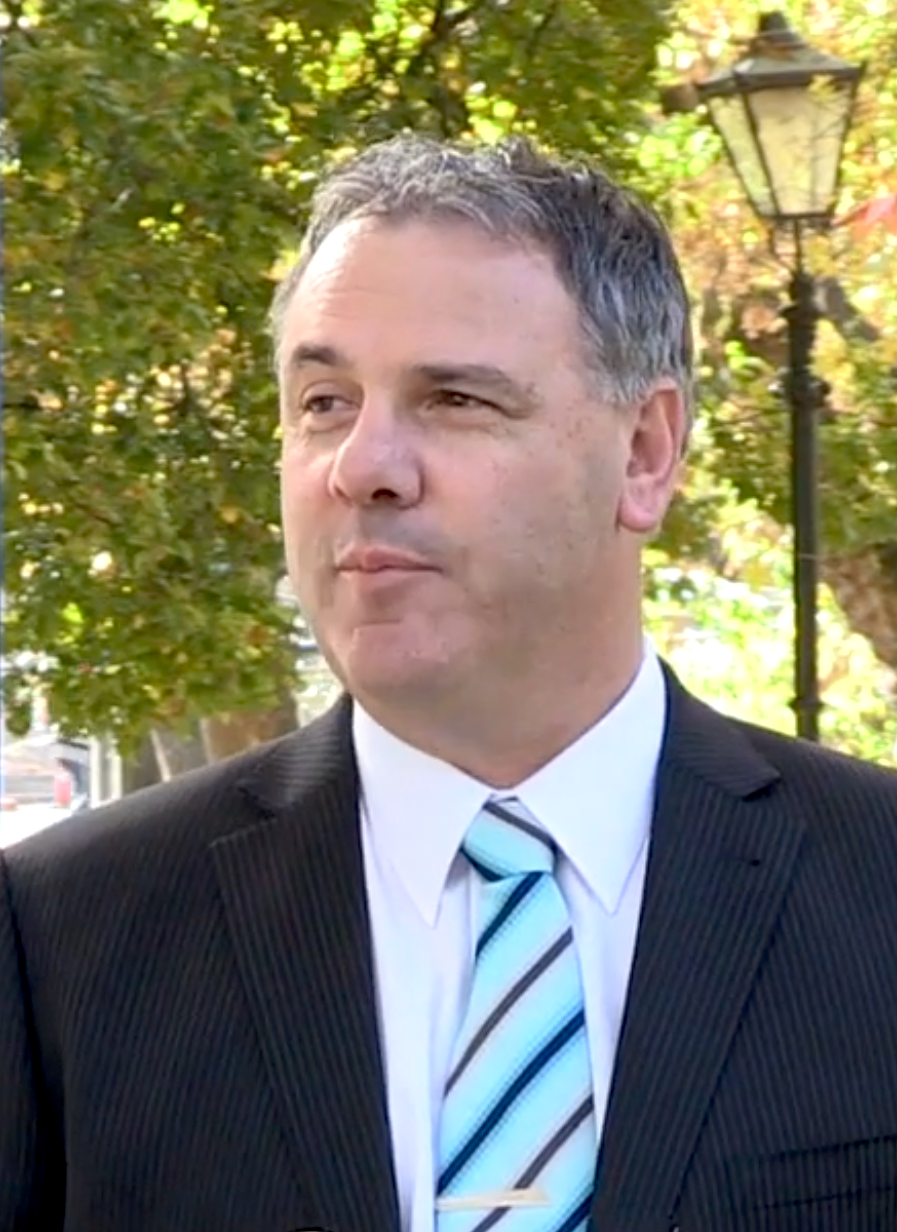
- Isaacs in 2012
- Born: Warwick Albert Isaacs
- Education: University of Otago (BCom)
- Occupation: Chief executive officer
- Known for: Director of CCDU at Canterbury Earthquake Recovery Authority
- Children: 3

Warwick Albert Isaacs is a New Zealand chief executive officer. He was the former chief executive of Timaru District Council, which he led throughout the 2000s. Isaacs became prominent in Canterbury in the 2010s for his role in the Christchurch rebuild effort, as part of the Canterbury Earthquake Recovery Authority (CERA), which saw him overseeing demolition projects and making decisions on key building plans.

In the late 1980s, Isaacs joined the Clutha District Council working in corporate services management. In the late 1990s, he became the chief executive of the Buller District Council. In 2000, Isaacs move to Timaru and was the chief executive of Timaru District Council until 2011.

From 2010 to 2011, Isaacs took a management role in civil defence, responding to both the 2010 Canterbury earthquake and 2011 Christchurch earthquakes. Following the latter, he relocated to Canterbury, and held various positions within the Canterbury Earthquake Recovery Authortiy (CERA) overseen by Gerry Brownlee, most notably as director of the Christchurch Central Development Unit. Isaacs was tasked with developing the final blueprint for the rebuild of the Christchurch central city, including making decisions on which buildings would be demolished, overseeing a NZ$4b work programme. Some of the decisions made during Isaac's leadership were met with criticism by heritage advocates, who criticised a perceived lack of consultation, while some business leaders challenged Brownlee and the CCDU on its processes. Isaacs maintained his role after a review and restructure, and advocated for expediting recovery efforts in the interest of the rebuild.

In 2015, Isaacs resigned from CERA and became the chief executive of Stonewood Homes. Less than a year after accepting the position, Stonewood Homes faced collapse and was bought out by Inno Capital. Isaacs claimed his concerns about Stonewood Homes' financial position had been "allayed" by executives shortly after he took the role. He signed a 6-month contract as acting chief executive to help the company transition to new ownership. In 2017, Isaacs and James Parker jointly took over the Christchurch branch of the Stonewood Homes franchise. In 2024, Transport Minister Simeon Brown announced Isaacs would join the NZ Transport Agency board.

== Biography ==
Isaacs grew up in Mosgiel. He left school aged 16 and joined New Zealand Railways in Dunedin, as his father and grandfather had worked for. Isaacs had considered becoming a mechanic, but chose not to due to his father's disapproval, and took up car restoration and tinkering as a hobby instead. In the 1980s, Isaacs began studying part-time while working. He received a BCom in Accountancy and Finance in 1988. (Note: Available via University of Otago alumni verification database) A year later, he began his career working for various councils in the south island.

In 2000, Isaacs moved to Timaru and became the chief executive of Timaru District Council, a role he held for 10 years until transitioning in 2011. Following the 2010 Canterbury earthquake, he spent increasing amounts of time in Christchurch, initially involved as chairman of a civil defence management group. Isaacs became more involved in Canterbury following the 2011 Christchurch earthquake, prompting him to leave Timaru and move his family to Christchurch; in 2012, he was living in Rolleston, a township on the outskirts of the city. He has a partner, Kaye, and a son and two daughters.

== Career ==
=== Early career and council work (1982–1999) ===
Isaacs joined New Zealand Railways aged 16, following in the footsteps of his father and grandfather. He began studying part time in 1982 at the University of Otago. In the mid-1980s while still studying, Isaacs ran his own part-time accountancy business, then worked for Audit New Zealand from around 1986. After graduating in 1988, he joined Clutha District Council as a corporate services manager, a role he held for 6 years. In the late 1990s, he became the chief executive for Buller District Council, and held the role for four years.

=== Timaru District Council (2000–2011) ===
Isaacs moved to Timaru in 2000 where he was appointed chief executive of Timaru District Council, a role he held for little over a decade. During his time as chief executive, the council constructed a new office on time and budget, introduced a three-bin kerbside collection service to improve rubbish and recycling services, and planned an upgrade of Caroline Bay and other water management and infrastructure policy, among other projects.

Isaacs began phasing out of the chief executive role in 2011, with Peter Nixon acting as chief executive, as he spent more time in Christchurch working on earthquake recovery projects. Nixon would fully assume the role after Isaacs departure.

=== CERA and earthquake projects (2010–2015) ===
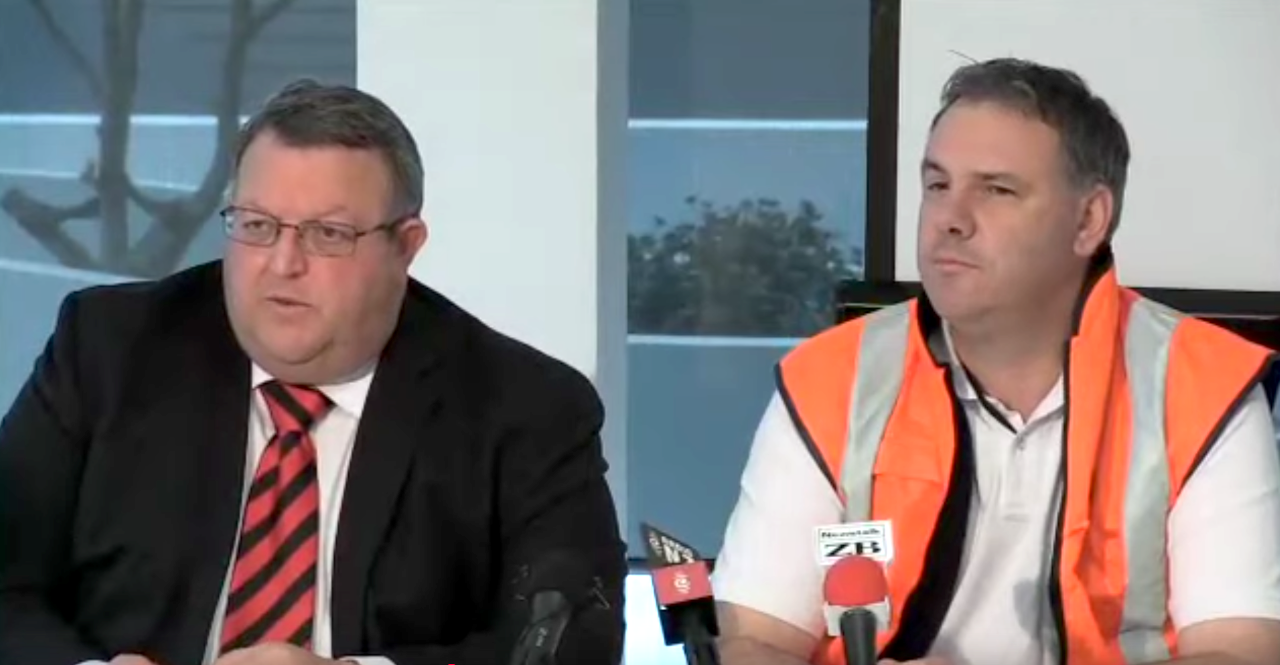
Brownlee and Isaacs at a CERA media briefing, July 2011

In late 2010, following the 2010 Canterbury earthquake, Isaacs spent several weeks in Christchurch in his role as chairman of a co-ordinating executive group which was part of Canterbury's civil defence management operations. He returned to Christchurch again, one day after the 2011 Christchurch earthquake, and resumed the role.

In 2012, Isaacs oversaw demolition projects in the central city, and was among those who made decisions about which buildings would be demolished in keeping with Christchurch's rebuild plans. In April that year, Canterbury Earthquake Recovery Minister Gerry Brownlee announced that Isaacs would be the director of the Christchurch Central Development Unit, which had then just been formed. The unit, part of CERA, was created to finalise a blueprint for the rebuild of central Christchurch following the 2011 Christchurch earthquake. Isaacs was tasked with creating a plan for how and where major development projects would be constructed in the central city. Isaacs' team was given an NZ$7m budget and was composed of 25 people, including Environment Canterbury staff and specialists in transport planning and the Resource Management Act, among others. Isaacs was also responsible for courting overseas investment in the city's projects, and effectively oversaw an NZ$4b recovery work programme.

In March 2015, Isaacs resigned from his position as director of the Christchurch Central Development Unit (CCDU), believing it was the right time for him to move on, stating in an interview: "when I look at the areas for which I'm responsible they are all sufficiently advanced".

==== Criticism of process ====
Isaacs made final decisions on the demolition of buildings in the central city, including heritage properties. Some of his decisions were controversial and drew criticism from organisations such as the New Zealand Historic Places Trust, particularly Isaacs' consultation process and decision to sign demolition notices for Christ Church Cathedral and Majestic Theatre. Some business and community leaders, including Humphry Rolleston and Tony Sewell, questioned the experience and potential conflicts of interest in CCDU leadership and processes, challenging Isaacs by implication. Following a review and restructuring, Isaacs continued to lead the CCDU.

Isaacs told media he did not regret his decisions, and described the heritage issues as "the hardest part of my job", stating "I've had to make those decisions so we could move on with the recovery of the central city".

=== Stonewood Homes (2015–present) ===
Following his departure from CERA, Isaac's immediately moved into the role of chief executive for Stonewood Homes, a residential construction company. Stonewood also hired Jim Boult and Neil Cochrane, two other prominent business figures in Canterbury. Isaacs remained in Christchurch but oversaw all 21 franchises across the country.

In 2016, Stonewood Homes faced collapse due to financial issues. Isaacs claimed he had raised concerns about the company's financial state shortly after taking the role as chief executive, but his concerns were "allayed" by executives. The company was bought out by Inno Capital, who rehired Isaacs on a 6-month contract as acting chief executive to help with the transition to new ownership.

In 2017, Isaacs and James Parker jointly took over the Christchurch branch of Stonewood Homes.

=== Other work ===
Isaacs has been director of a series of companies, mainly related to property. Isaacs was on the South Canterbury District Health Board. In 2024, government Transport Minister Simeon Brown announced Isaacs would join the NZ Transport Agency board for a 3-year term.
