= Rose Historic Chapel =

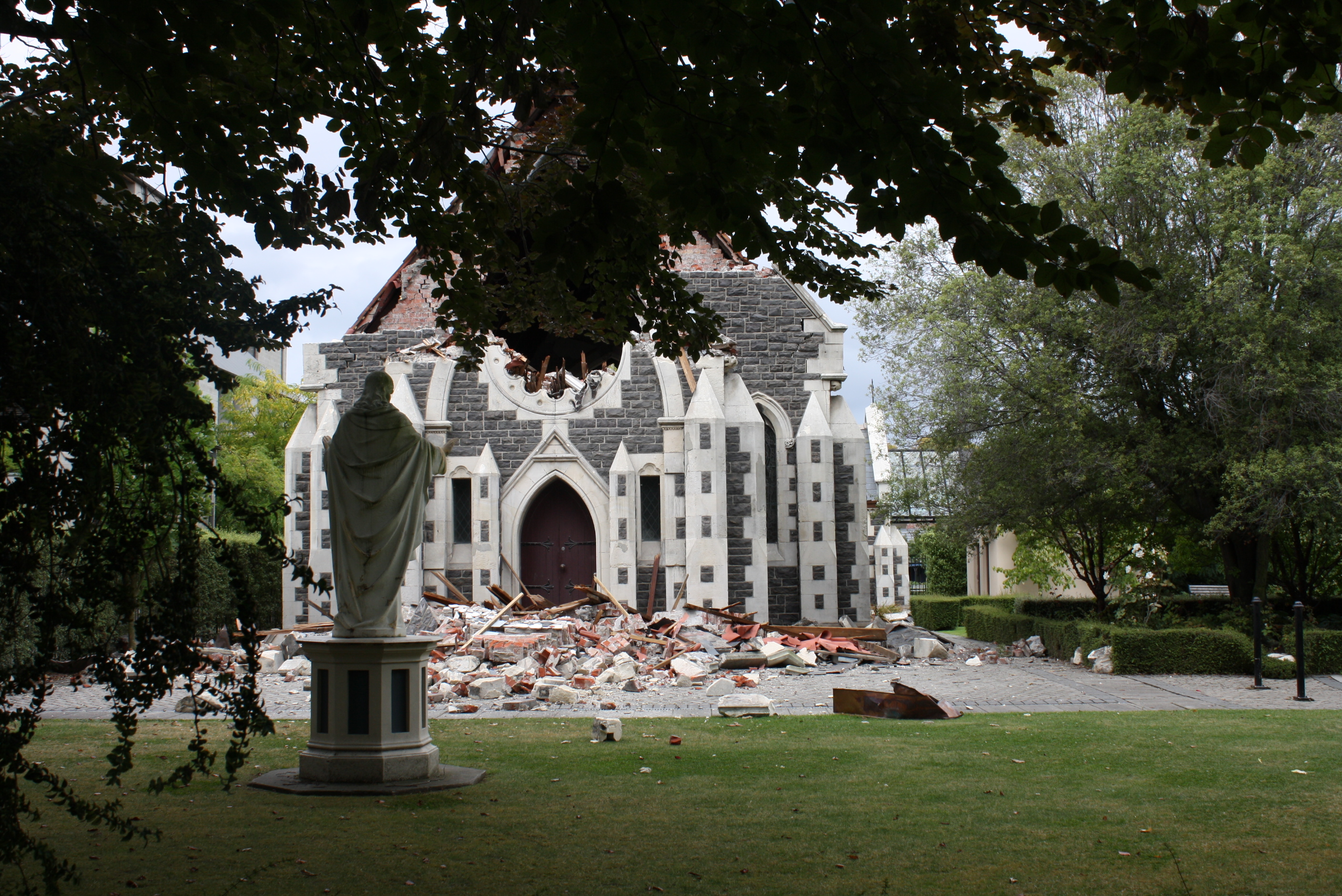
- The Rose Historic Chapel following the February 2011 earthquake
- Rose Historic Chapel
- 43.52312°S 172.6371°E
- Location: Christchurch Central City, Christchurch
- Country: New Zealand
- Denomination: Non-denominational
- Previous denomination: Catholic
- Website: rosehistoricchapel.co.nz

History
- Former name: St Mary's Convent Chapel
- Status: Catholic chapel (1910 – c. 1994); Non-denominational chapel (since c. 1994)
- Founder: Bishop John Grimes
- Events: 2011 Christchurch earthquake

Architecture
- Functional status: Preserved
- Architect: Sidney and Alfred Luttrell
- Architectural type: Church
- Style: Gothic Revival
- Completed: 1910
- Closed: 1994 (as a Catholic chapel)

Specifications
- Materials: Hoon Hay and Oamaru stone

Heritage New Zealand – Category 2
- Official name: St Mary's Convent Chapel
- Designated: 14 July 1995
- Reference no.: 7239

The Rose Historic Chapel, formerly the St Mary's Convent Chapel, is a heritage-listed stone former Roman Catholic chapel located in Colombo Street in Christchurch, New Zealand. It is registered as a "Historic Place – Category II " by the New Zealand Historic Places Trust. The building was designed in the Gothic Revival style and erected in 1910.

== History ==
The first Bishop of Christchurch, John Grimes (1842–1915), arrived in Christchurch in February 1888. He provided leadership to the Catholic community, and worked towards uniting the class differences, political opinions and different nationalities of the settlers. During his reign, many churches and buildings were constructed, including the Sisters of Mercy St Mary's Convent. For his silver jubilee as a bishop, he was invested with several ecclesiastical honours for his contributions.

The Sisters of Mercy arrived in Christchurch in 1894, when under the guidance of Mother Mary Bernard (1810/1811?–1895), St Marys Parish School and Convent was established. The chapel, built in 1910, is the last remaining building of the St Mary's Convent, the rest of the complex having been demolished in 1994. The chapel was designed by the brothers Alfred Edgar Luttrell and Edward Sidney Luttrell; this was their first commission by the Diocese of Christchurch and they became their unofficial diocesan architects, designing many more churches and other buildings.

It was purchased by the Christchurch City Council, who renovated the building in association with the Rose Chapel Trust and Friends of the chapel. The chapel was damaged during the 2011 Christchurch earthquake. After about two years of repairwork, the chapel reopened in July 2018.

== Heritage listing ==
On 14 July 1995, the chapel was registered by the New Zealand Historic Places Trust as a Category II historic place, with the registration number being 7239. The chapel is significant for its aesthetics (especially the stained glass windows), its architecture (the Luttrell brothers are known for their well designed churches), cultural importance (as a religious teaching place) and spiritual life for the nuns.
