= Isaac Theatre Royal =

Theatre in Christchurch, New Zealand

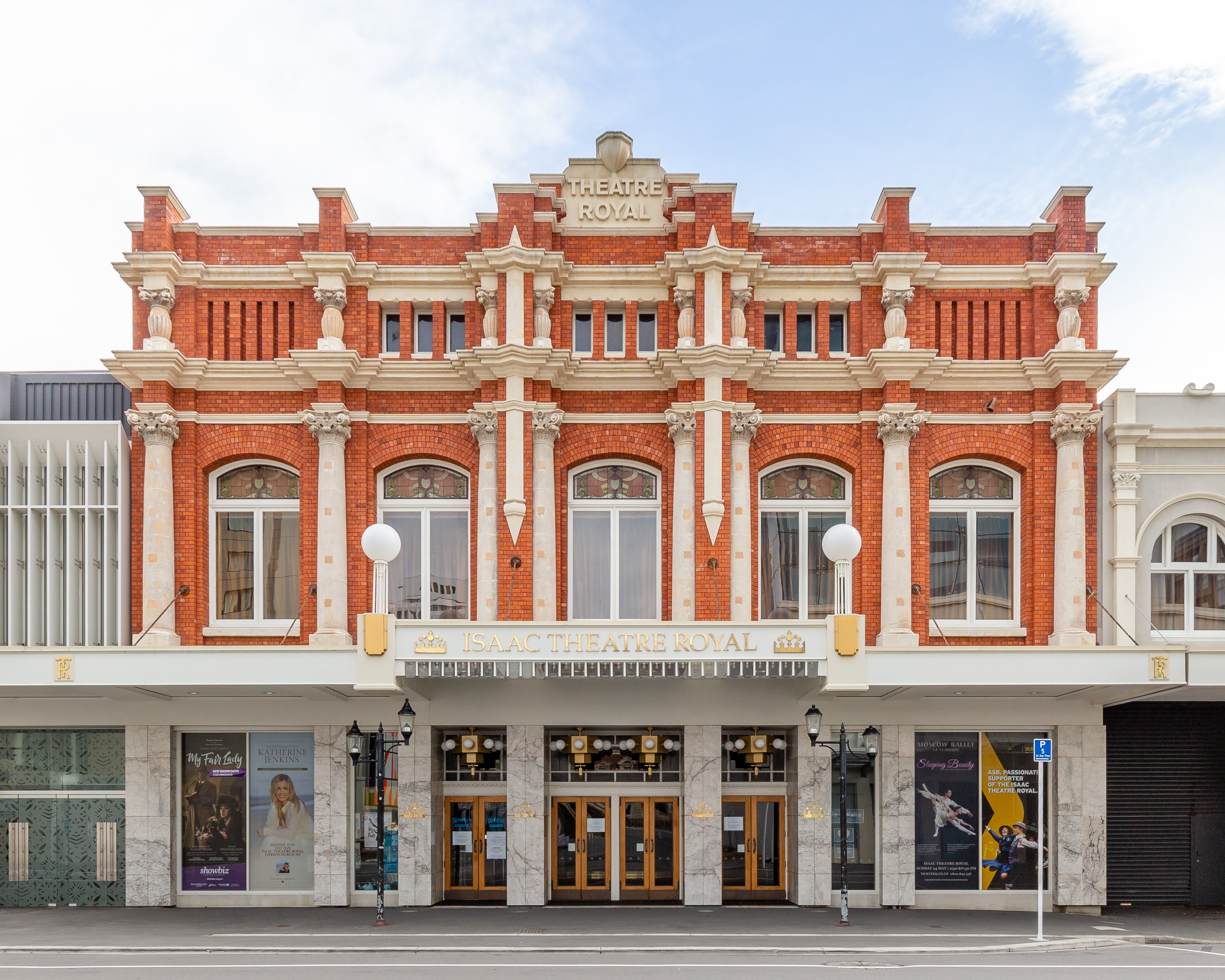
- Isaac Theatre Royal in April 2020
- Interactive map of the Isaac Theatre Royal area

General information
- Type: Theatre
- Architectural style: Edwardian
- Location: Christchurch Central City, 145 Gloucester Street, Christchurch, New Zealand
- Coordinates: 43°31′47″S 172°38′18″E
- Construction started: 1906
- Completed: 1908

Technical details
- Lifts/elevators: 1

Design and construction
- Architect: Sidney and Alfred Luttrell

Renovating team
- Other designers: Warren and Mahoney

Other information
- Seating capacity: 1,290

Website
- www.isaactheatreroyal.co.nz

Heritage New Zealand – Category 1
- Designated: 16 November 1989
- Reference no.: 1936

The Isaac Theatre Royal (formerly known as the Theatre Royal) is a heritage building in Christchurch, New Zealand, designed by brothers Sidney and Alfred Luttrell. Built in 1908, it is the only operational Edwardian-style theatre remaining in New Zealand.

== History ==
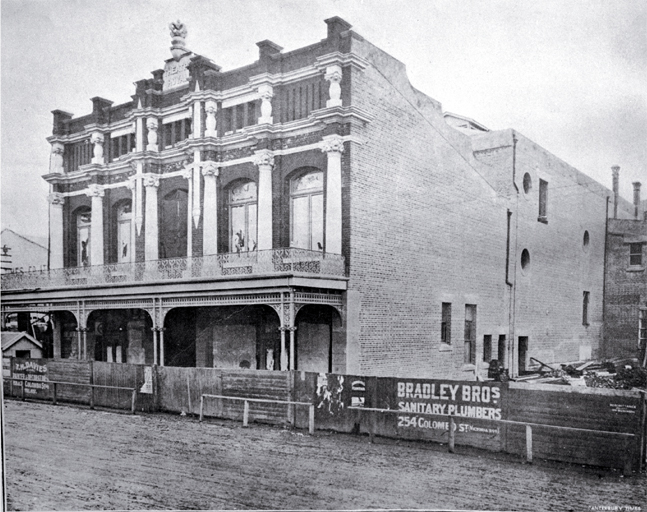
Theatre Royal in 1907

The current Theatre Royal is the third theatre of its name on Gloucester Street. The first theatre, built in 1861, was on a site across the road from the current Theatre Royal. It was originally called the Canterbury Music Hall. That building was replaced by a newer theatre on the same site in 1876. Five years after the new theatre was completed it was renamed the Theatre Royal. When the current theatre was built in 1908 the old theatre across the road was sold to The Press, which owned it up until the Canterbury earthquakes.

== Renovations ==
In 1928 the theatre was refitted as a cinema. During the refit the current marble staircase replaced the original wooden one. Significant structural earthquake strengthening was carried out in 1999 and 2000. Between 2004 and 2005 major work was done to the theatre over a nine-month period at a cost of $6.2 million. The whole backstage was demolished to make room for a modern concrete fly tower and dressing room facilities. The Proscenium arch was also widened by 1.5m and the stage and fly tower were made wider and deeper. The facilities within the existing front of house areas were also upgraded. It was during the 2004/5 renovation that the theatre became the Isaac Theatre Royal, to honour supporter Lady Diana Isaac.

== Canterbury earthquakes and restoration ==
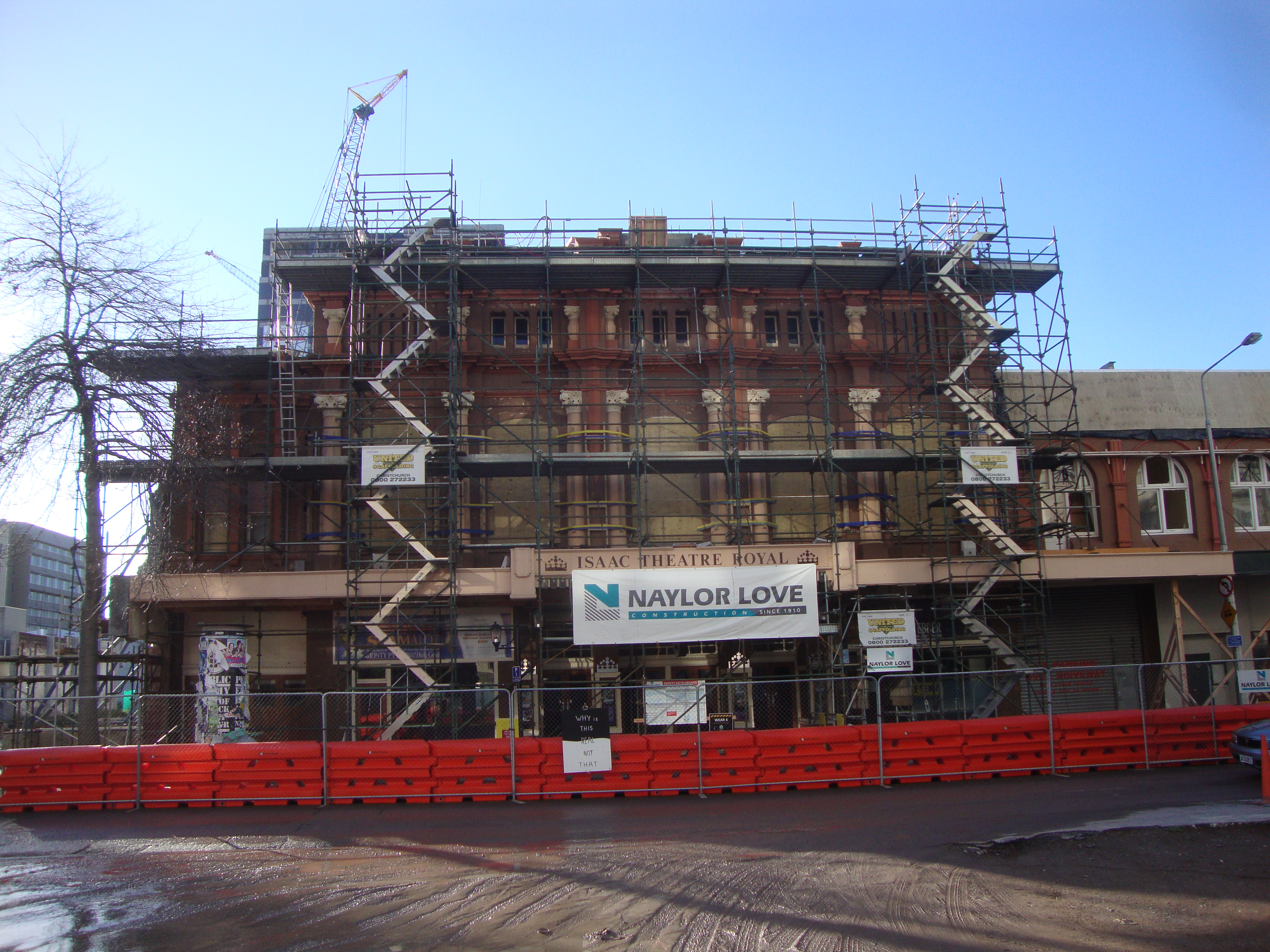
Isaac Theatre Royal during renovation/earthquake repair

The 1908 auditorium and foyer sustained considerable damage during the February 2011 Christchurch earthquake and the June aftershock. The Theatre was closed for nearly four years while the restoration took place. At a cost of $40 million the Theatre was completely restored and brought up to current building code requirements. All of the significant architectural elements were rescued and restored by skilled craftsmen; including a completely rebuilt auditorium dome made from carbon fibre using the original 1908 painted mural by Studio Carolina Izzo. The newly restored Theatre opened on 17 November 2014.

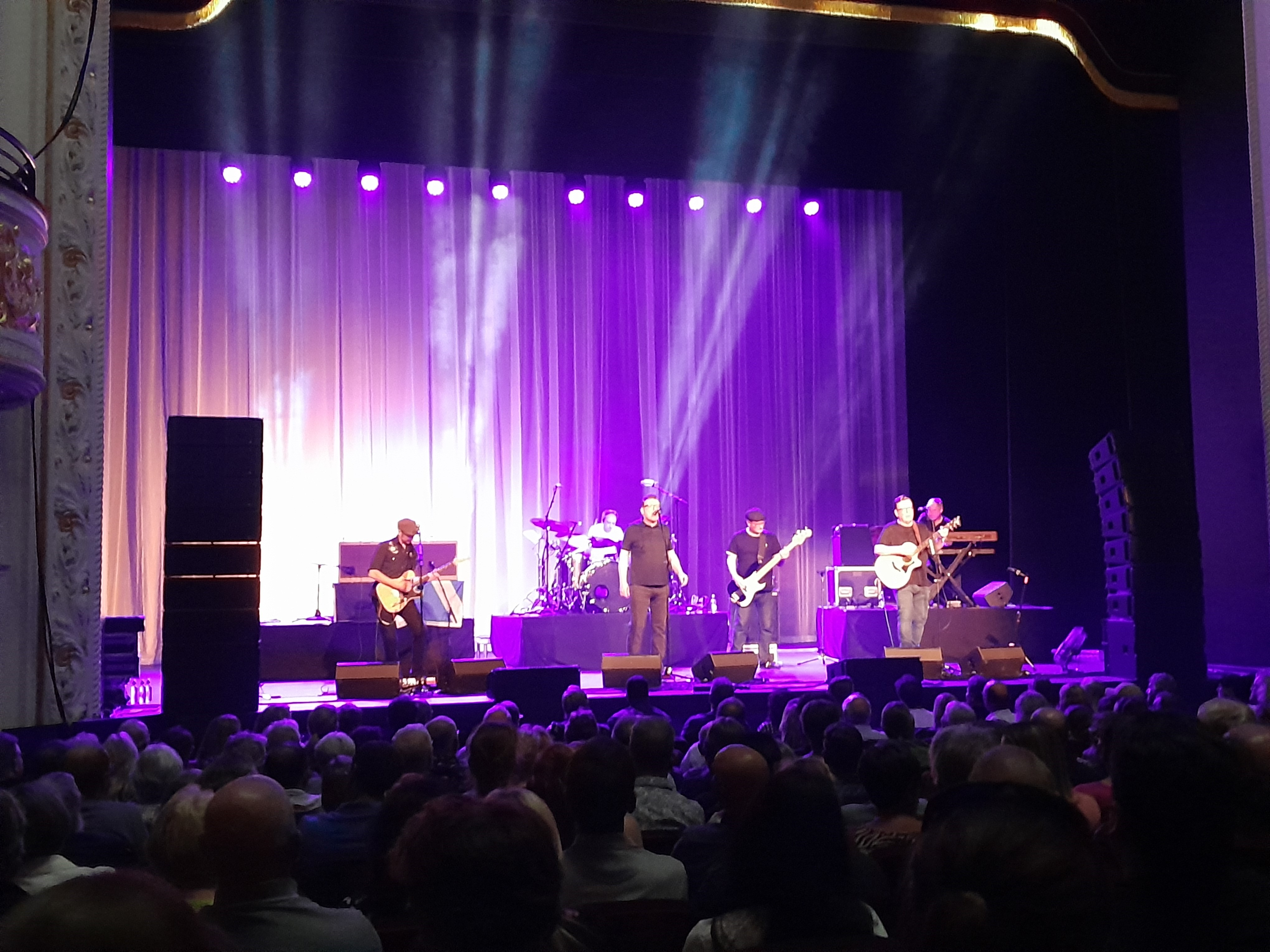
The Proclaimers performing at the Isaac Theatre Royal, March 2023
