= John Ombler =

New Zealand public servant

John Ombler CNZM QSO
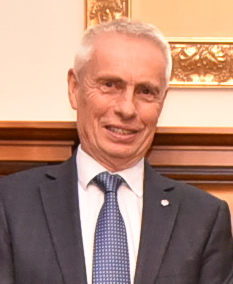
- Ombler in 2020
- Born: John Stewart Ombler
- Occupation: Public servant

John Stewart Ombler CNZM QSO is a New Zealand public servant. He served as deputy State Services Commissioner from 2008 until 2014, and briefly in 2019, and as the controller of the all-of-government response during the 2020 COVID-19 pandemic.

== Career ==
Ombler joined the New Zealand National Parks and Reserves Authority (part of the Department of Lands and Survey) in 1975, transitioning to the Department of Conservation when it was formed in 1987. He was a conservator in Whanganui, Hawke's Bay and Auckland, before being appointed as a regional general manager in 1997. While based at Pipiriki on the Whanganui River in the early 1980s, Ombler and his then-wife Kathy co-wrote books about both the river and the Whanganui River Road.

In 2007, Ombler joined the State Services Commission. The following year, he was appointed acting deputy State Services Commissioner, and he was confirmed in that role in 2009.

As deputy State Services Commissioner, Ombler was the interim chief executive officer of the Canterbury Earthquake Recovery Authority (CERA) at its establishment following the 2011 Christchurch earthquake. Ombler returned to CERA as acting chief executive officer on 1 December 2014, taking over from Roger Sutton, and remained in that role until the agency was dissolved in 2016.

In November 2017, Ombler was appointed to conduct an inquiry under the auspices of the State Services Commission into financial irregularities at the Waikato District Health Board. In 2019, Ombler returned as deputy State Services Commissioner on a temporary basis between February and June while a permanent appointee was sought. In June 2019, he carried out an investigation into the actions and statements of chief executive and secretary to the Treasury, Gabriel Makhlouf, regarding unauthorised access to sensitive material related to the 2019 New Zealand budget.

During the 2020 COVID-19 pandemic in New Zealand, Ombler was appointed controller of the all-of-government response and, in that capacity, was a deputy chief executive of the Department of the Prime Minister and Cabinet. He left that role in late 2020.

In April 2021, Local Government Minister Nanaia Mahuta announced Ombler would be a panel member of the Government's independent review of local government.

== Honours ==
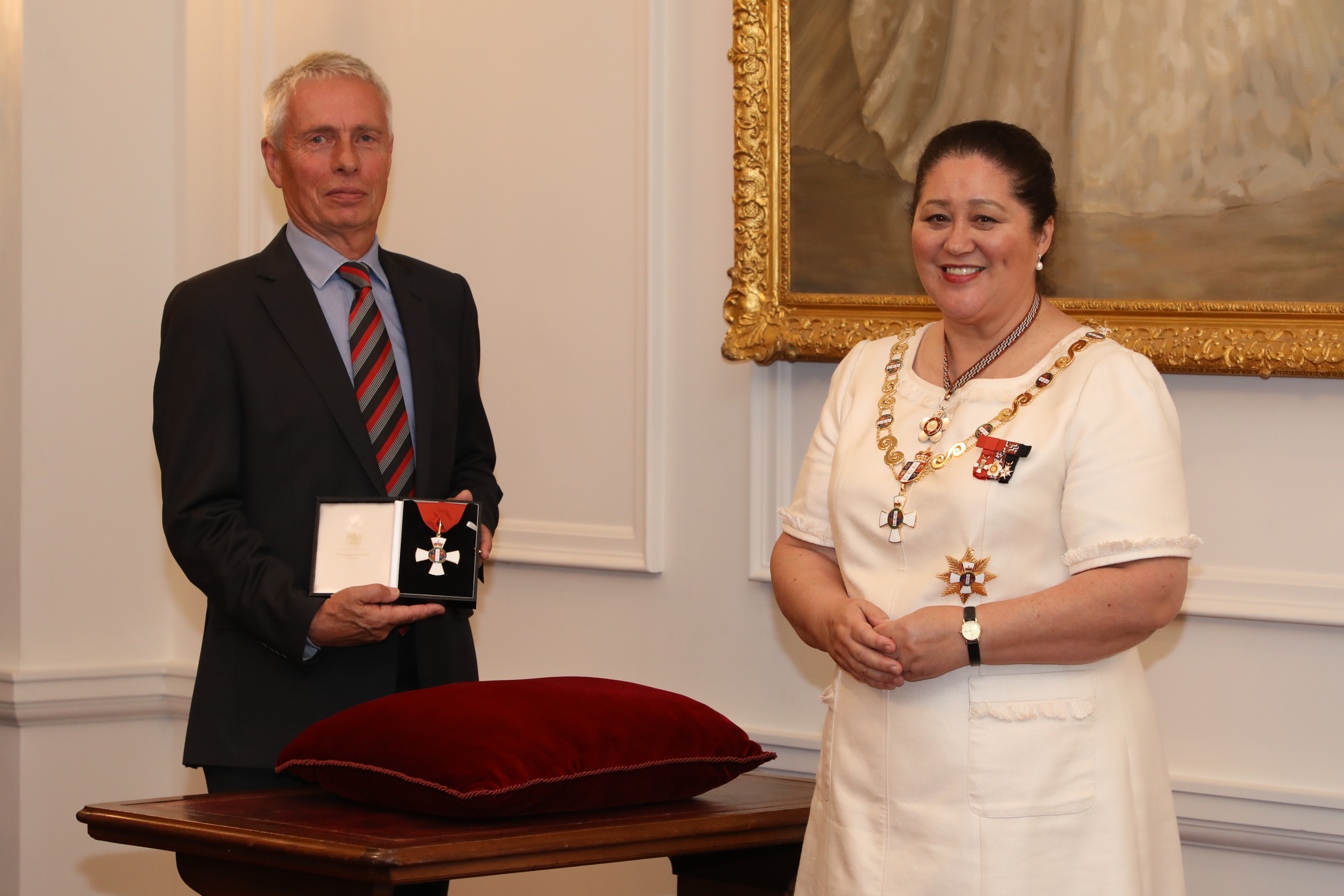
Ombler (left), after his investiture as a Companion of the New Zealand Order of Merit by the governor-general, Dame Cindy Kiro, at Government House, Wellington, on 13 December 2021

In the 2013 Queen's Birthday Honours, Ombler was appointed a Companion of the Queen's Service Order, for services to the State. In the 2021 Queen's Birthday Honours, he was appointed a Companion of the New Zealand Order of Merit, for services to the public service.
