= Sidney and Alfred Luttrell =

New Zealand architectural firm

Edward Sydney "Sidney" Luttrell (20 June 1872 – 17 July 1932) and his brother Alfred Edward Luttrell (1865–1924) were partners of S. & A. Luttrell, a firm of architects and building contractors noted for its contributions to New Zealand architecture, both in terms of style and technology. The practice was established in Launceston, Tasmania, in 1897 when Alfred who was operating his own architectural practice, went into partnership with his younger brother and former apprentice Sidney, under the original name A. & S. Luttrell. The brothers moved to Christchurch, New Zealand, and by 1902 were submitting tender notices there. Sidney Luttrell was also noted for his keen interest in horse racing. He was a part-owner of Sasanoff, winner of the Melbourne Cup in 1916.

== Selected works ==
=== Christchurch ===
- King Edward Barracks
- Royal Exchange building (later known as the Regent Theatre)
- New Zealand Express Company building (later known as the MLC Building and Manchester Courts)
- Theatre Royal
- Chapel for the Sisters of the Good Shepherd at Mount Magdala
- Bandsmen's Memorial Rotunda
- St Mary's Convent Chapel (currently known as Rose Historic Chapel)
- Warner's Hotel; 1910 addition of a fourth storey
- the interior of the Odeon Theatre was remodelled by Sidney Luttrell in 1927
- Majestic Theatre, opened in 1930, was designed and planned by their practice

=== Elsewhere ===
- New Zealand Express Company building, Dunedin (currently known as Consultancy House)
- St Mary's Catholic Church, Hokitika

== Gallery of buildings ==
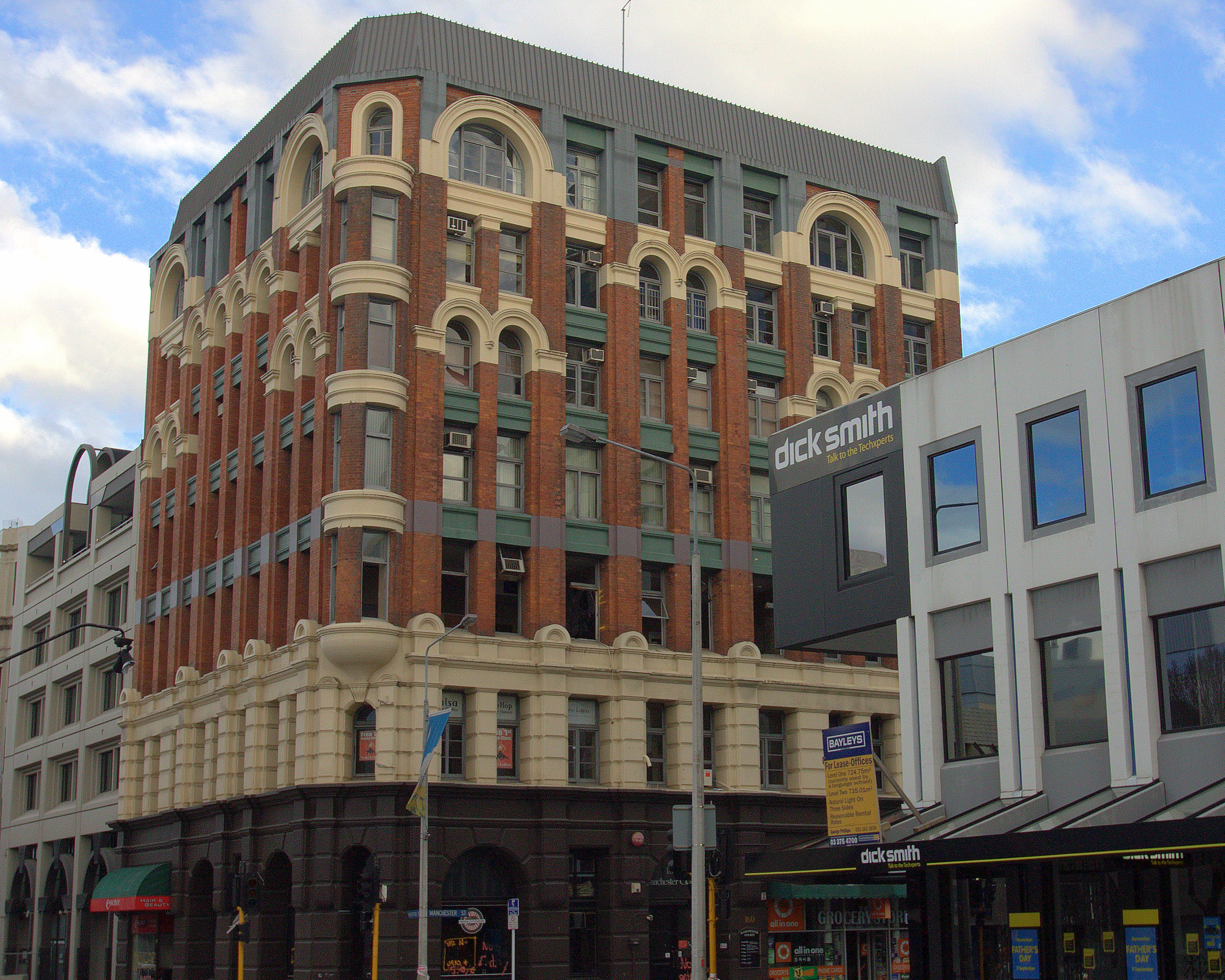
Manchester Courts

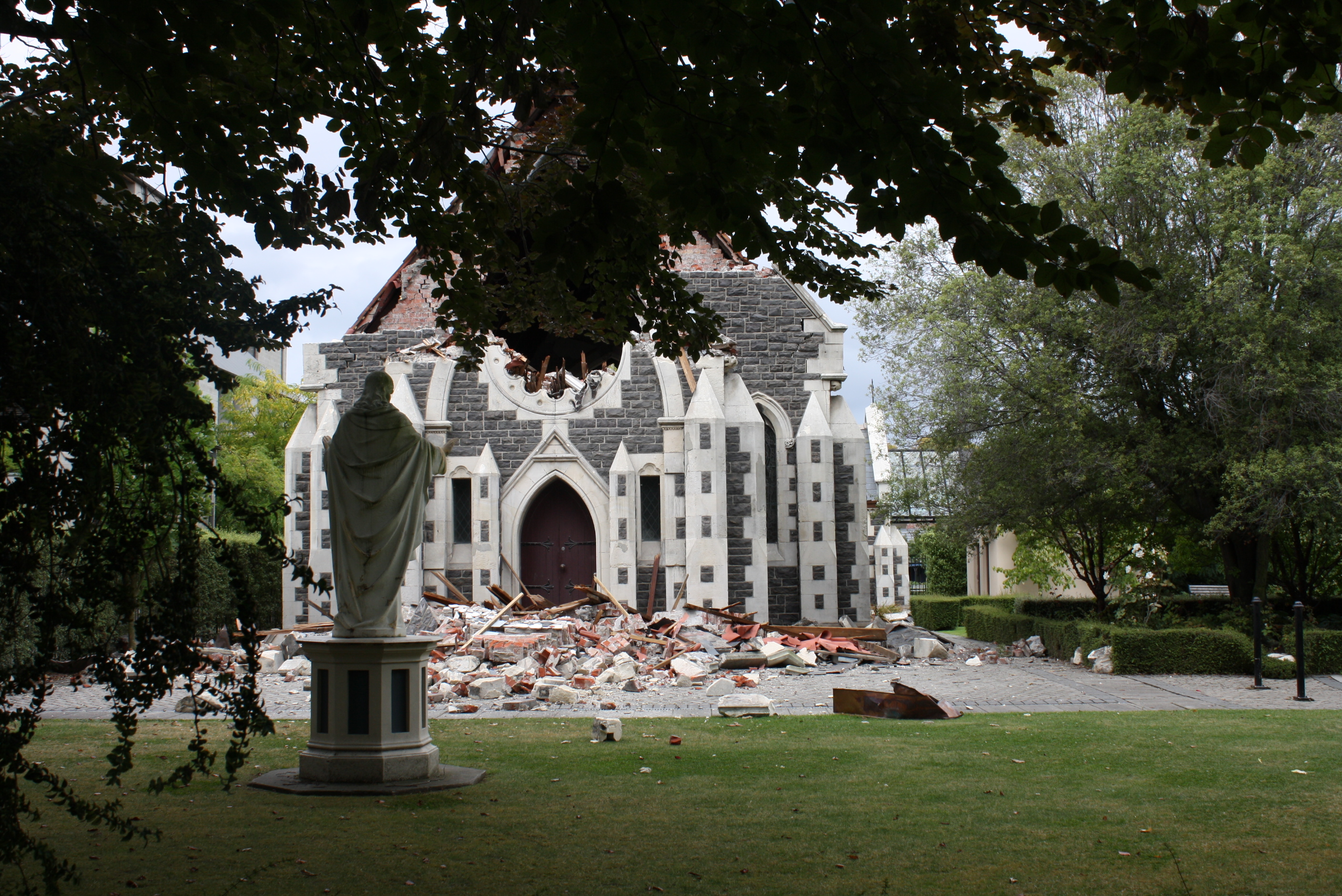
Rose Historic Chapel

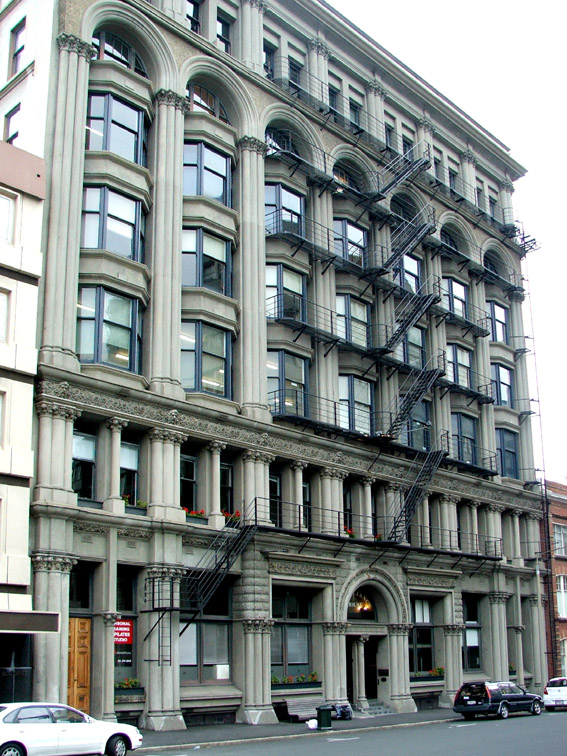
Consultancy House

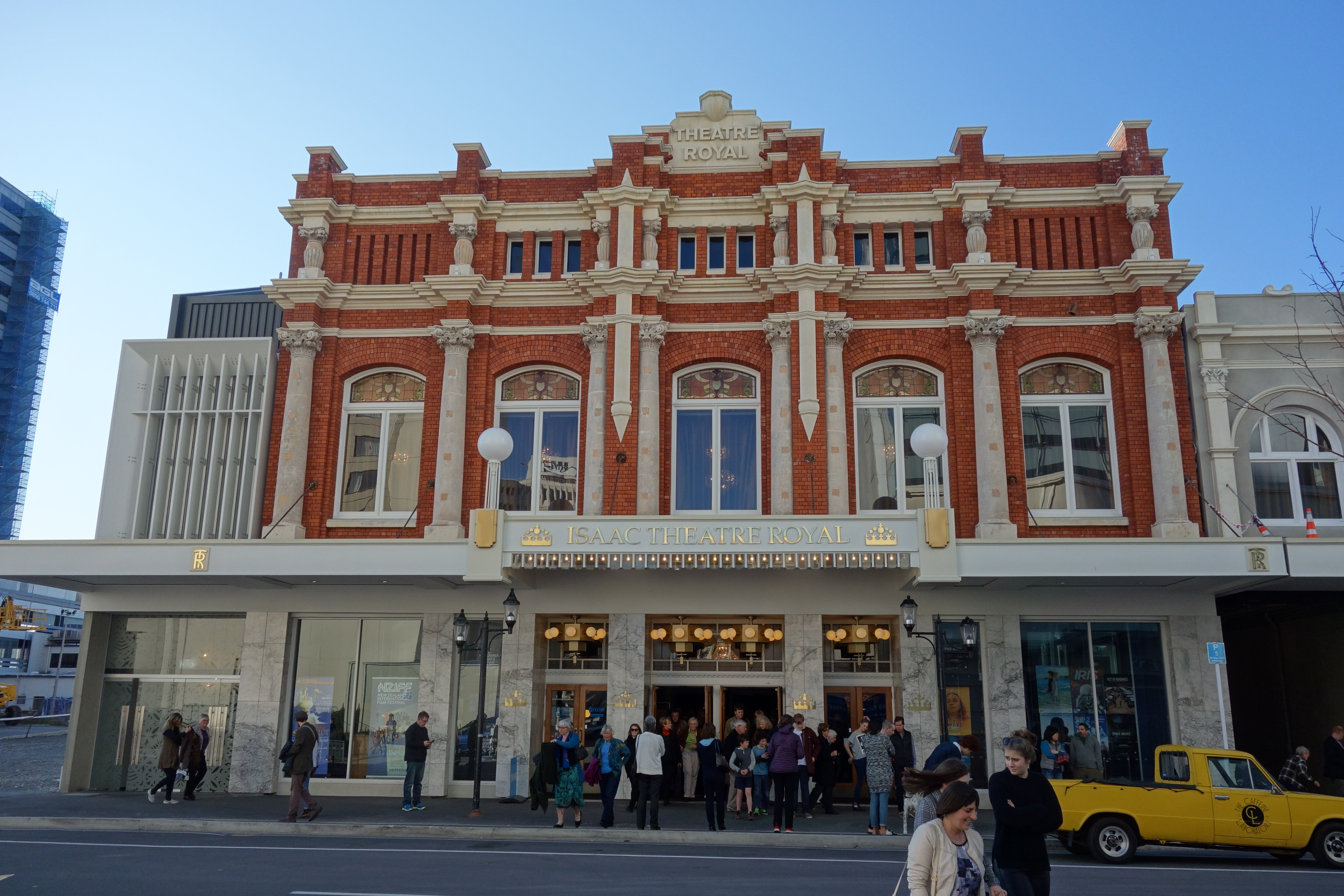
Isaac Theatre Royal

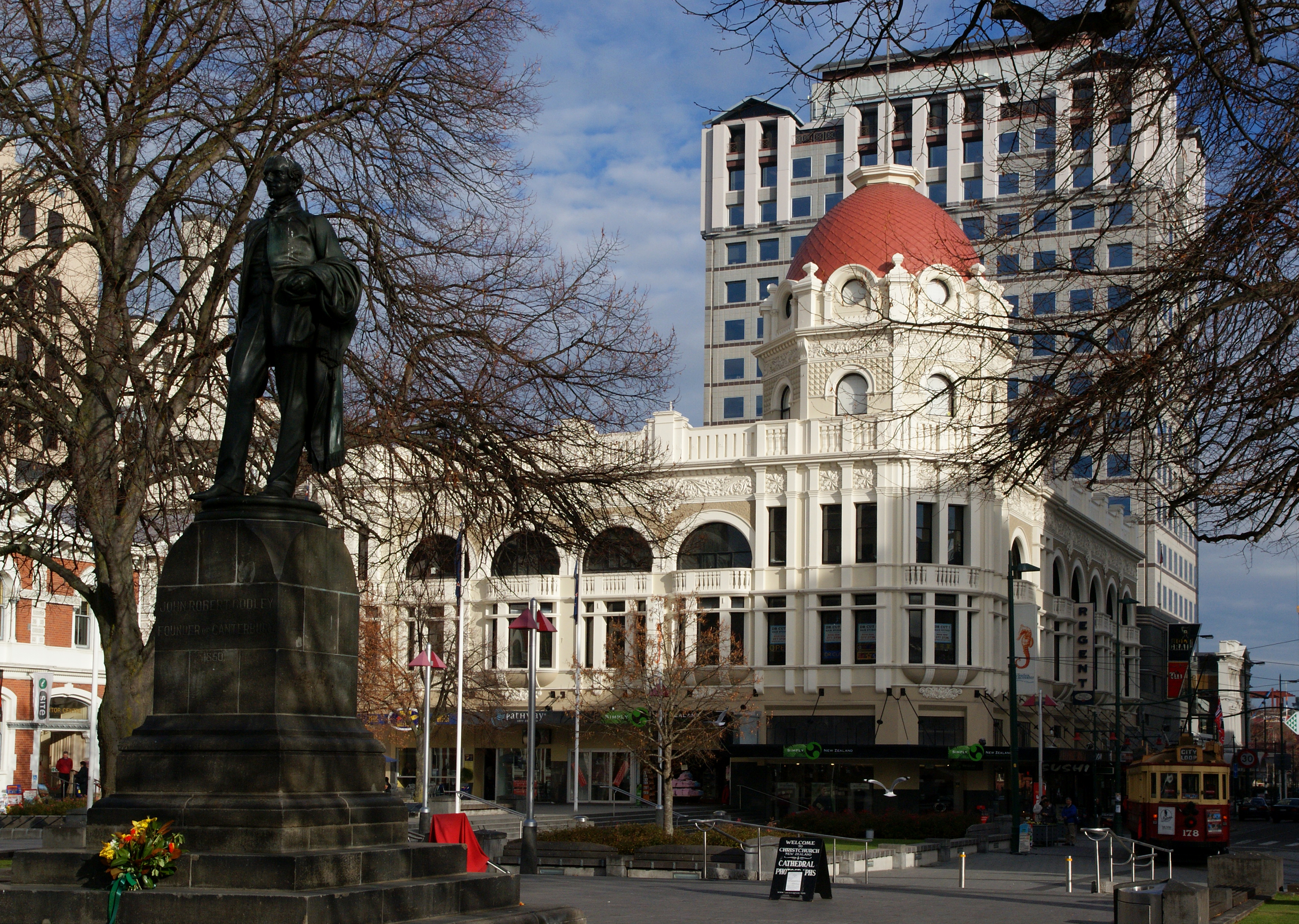
Royal Exchange building

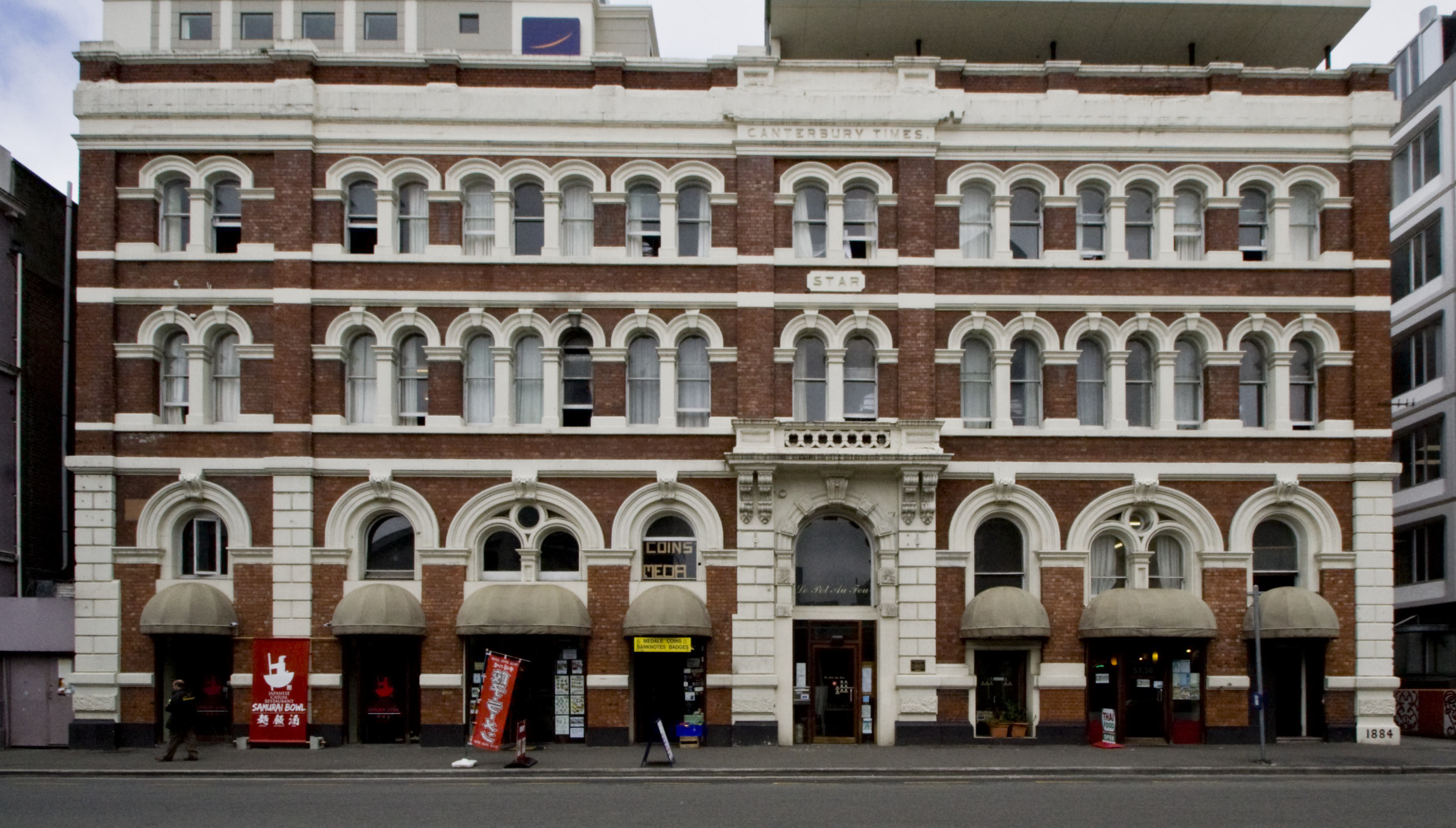
Lyttelton Times building

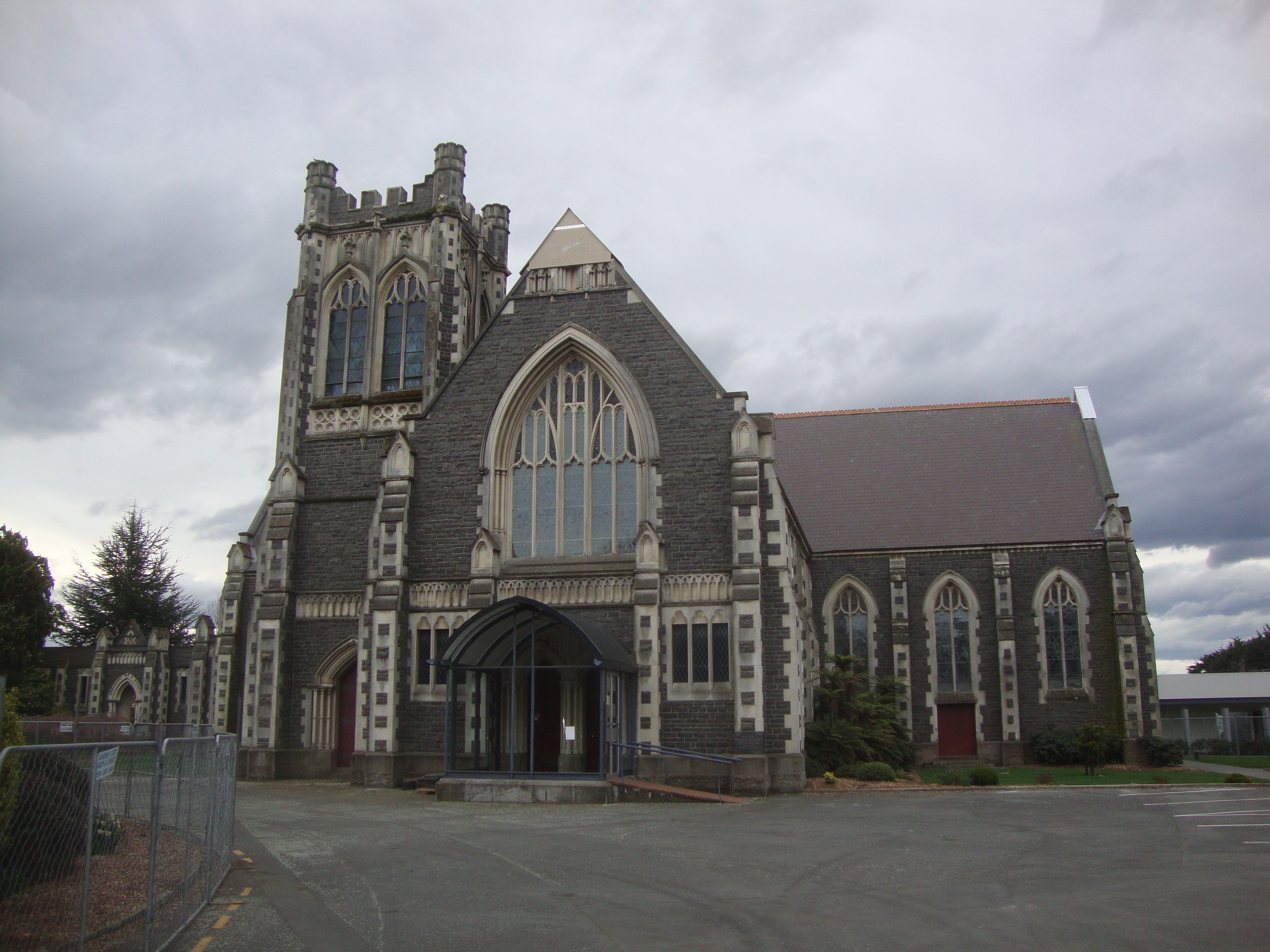
St John of God chapel
