= Bandsmen's Memorial Rotunda =

War memorial bandstand in Hagley Park, Christchurch

- New Zealand
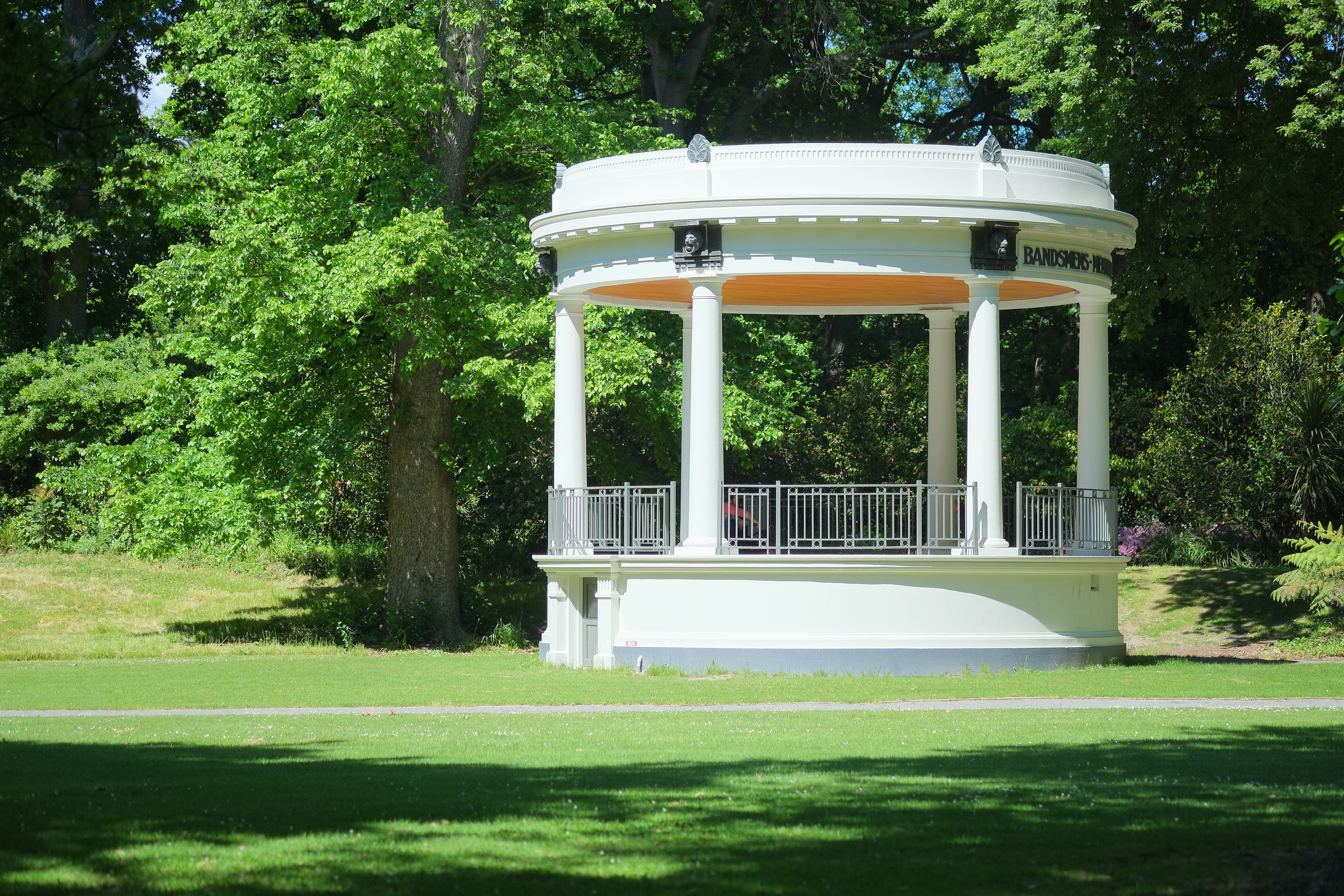
- Bandsmen's Memorial Rotunda
- For World War I
- Established: 1926
- Unveiled: 19 September 1926
- Location: 43°31′57.5″S 172°37′19″E; Hagley Park, Christchurch
- Designed by: Sidney and Alfred Luttrell

Heritage New Zealand – Category 2
- Designated: 11 November 1981
- Reference no.: 3093

The Bandsmen's Memorial Rotunda is a memorial bandstand in Hagley Park, Christchurch. Built in 1926 to commemorate armed forces bandsmen that died during World War I, the rotunda is on the south-side of the Avon River / Ōtākaro, opposite the Christchurch Botanic Gardens and close to Christchurch Hospital.

== History ==
Prior to World War I, there had been some money raised to form a brass band in Addington. However, the outbreak of war interrupted these plans, and in 1920 the money raised was instead put forward for the establishment of a memorial to bandsmen killed in the war. A band rotunda had been suggested as early as 1917 to provide a place for public music performances in the Christchurch Botanic Gardens, and this was seen as an appropriate memorial. Fundraising for the rotunda took over five years, and in 1923 it was believed the total required was £NZ700. A major reason for the delay was the desire of the organising committee to build it in the "ideal" place, which they considered to be the Archery Lawn in the centre of the gardens. In 1924, possibly in an attempt to speed up the process, a location on the banks of the Avon River between Colombo and Manchester streets was made available, with the Christchurch City Council setting aside £NZ400 to build a municipal band rotunda. It was suggested that the memorial rotunda project should be moved to this location, so that the funds could be combined to build a grander structure. The organising committee apparently declined the offer, and the site was later used for the Edmonds Band Rotunda.

The rotunda was designed by Sidney and Alfred Luttrell and constructed by the Rennell Brothers. The roof is supported by Doric columns. The design was intended to include a dome on the roof, which was never built.

In November 1925 the ceremony to lay the foundation stone was held, despite the rotunda being mostly complete by that stage. The rotunda was officially opened on 19 September 1926 at a ceremony led by Heaton Rhodes.

The columns were replaced in the 1990s due to extensive water damage. The structure sustained significant damage in the 2011 Christchurch earthquake, but was subsequently restored.

== Gallery ==
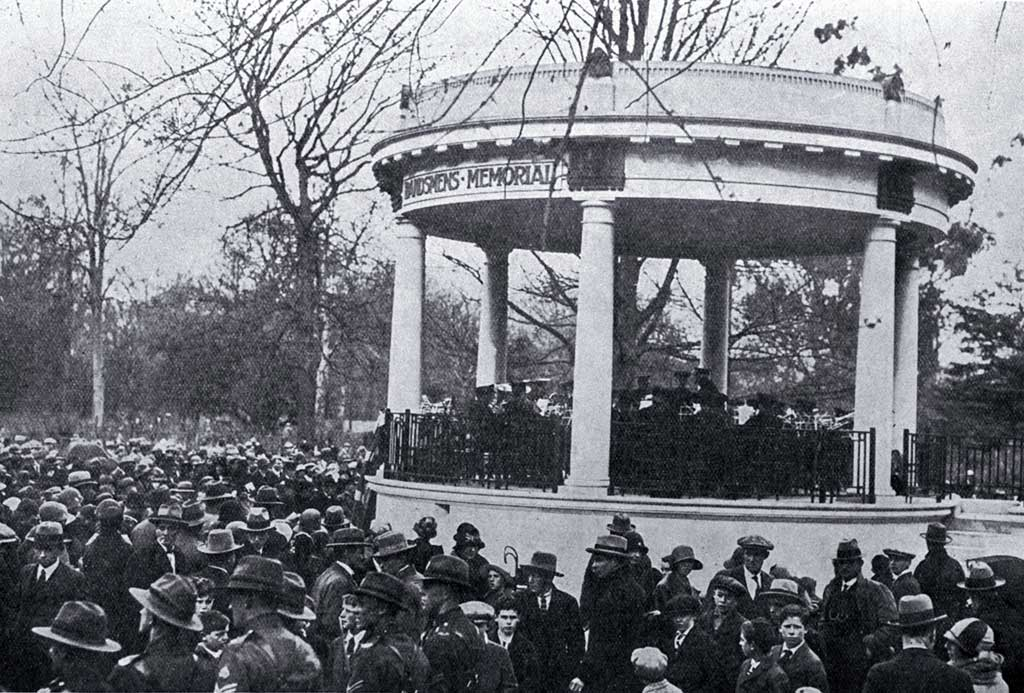
The rotunda during the opening ceremony in September 1926

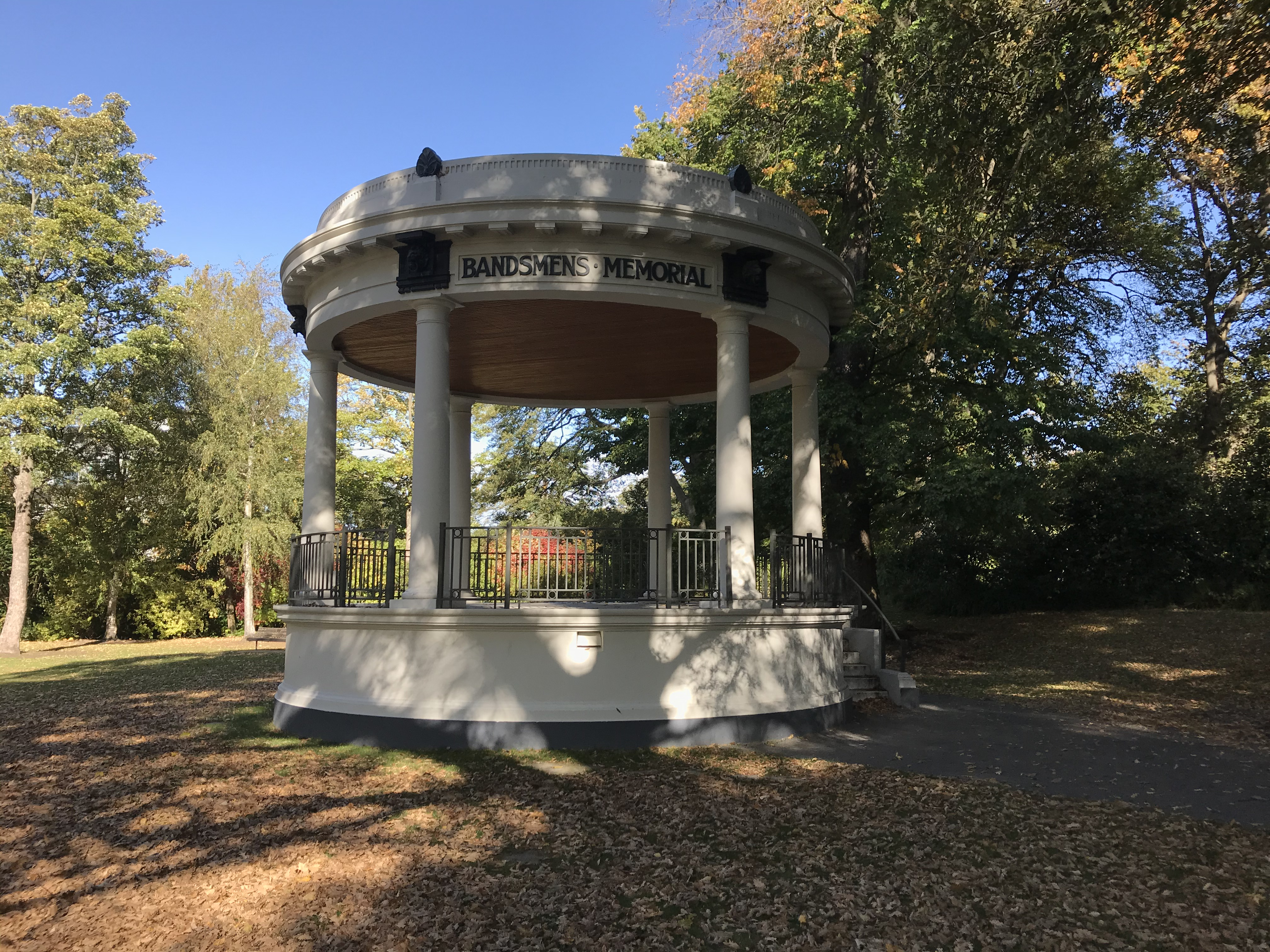
The rotunda surrounded by fallen Turkish oak leaves in autumn

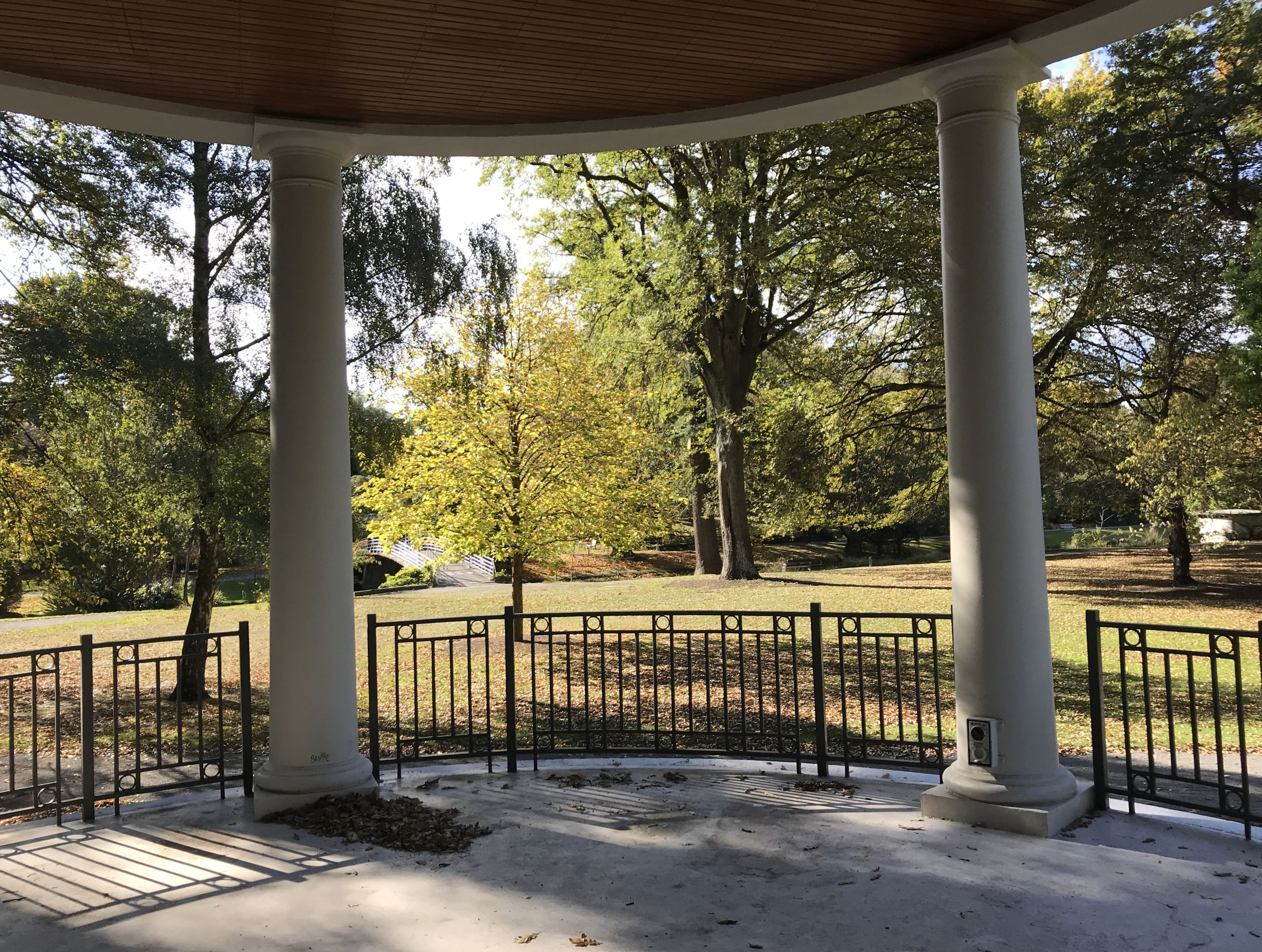
View from the stage looking north-east

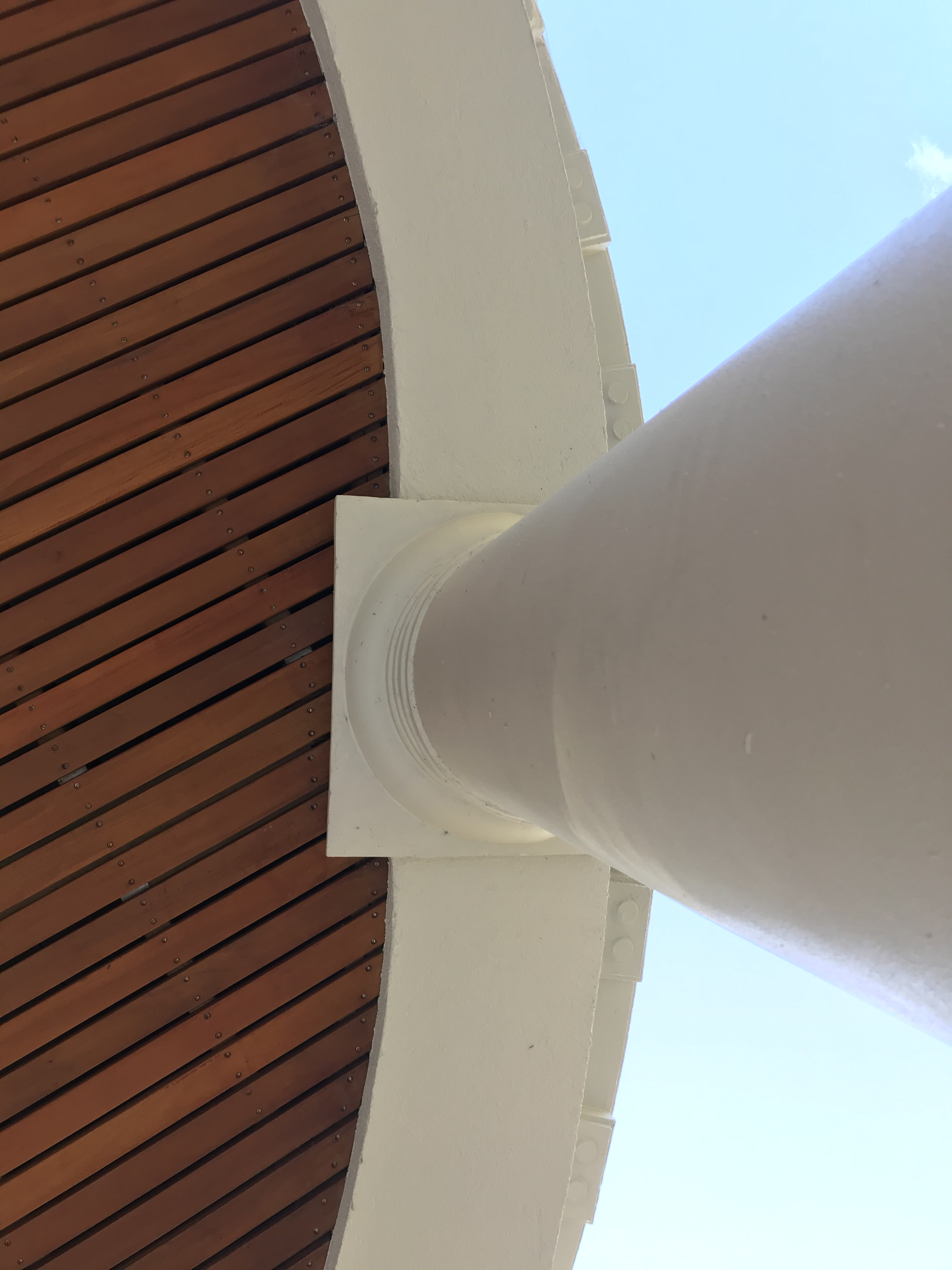
Detail of the Doric-style columns that support the roof

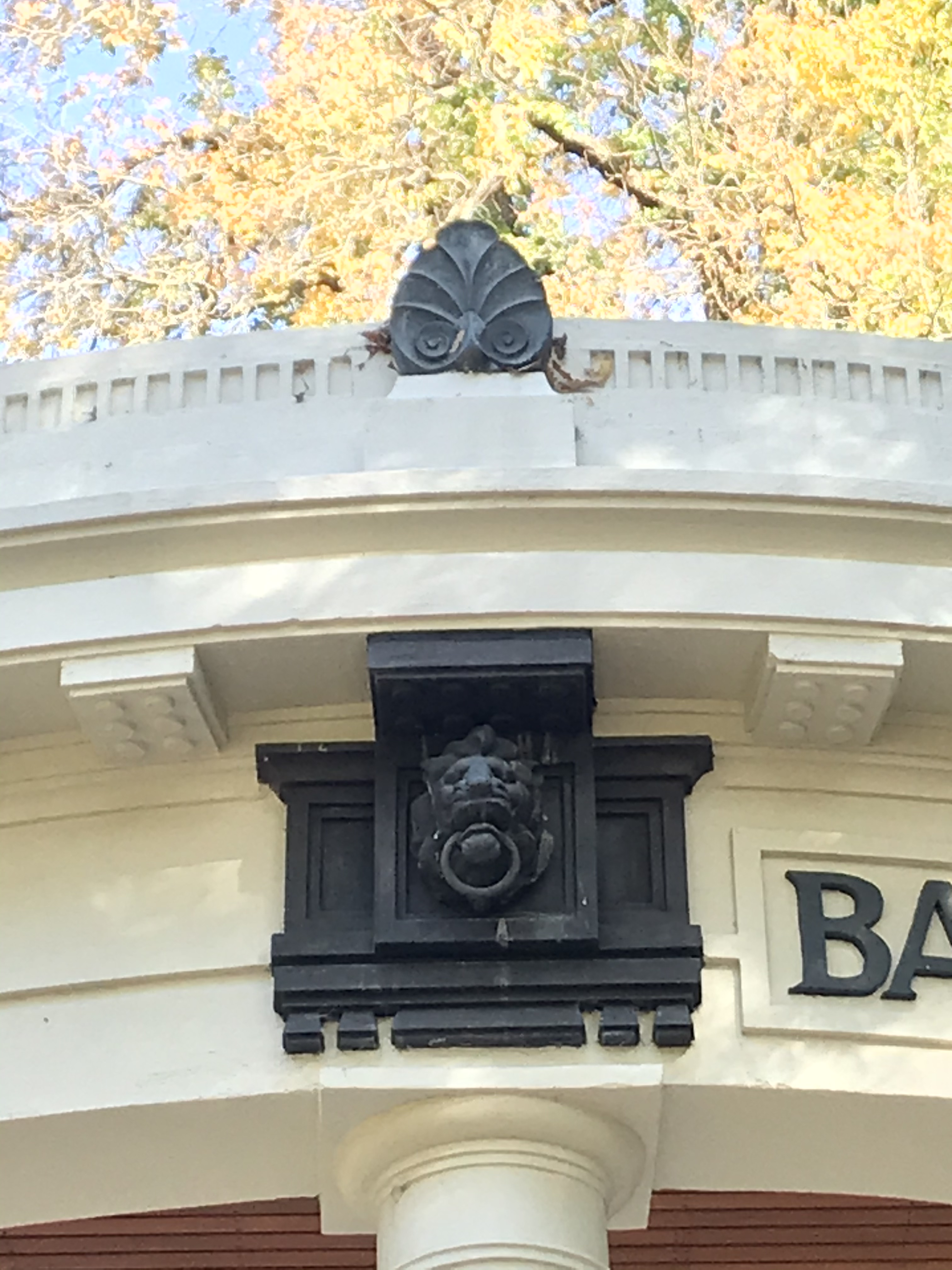
The rotunda is adorned with lion-head reliefs above each of the six columns
