= Roger Sutton =

New Zealand businessman

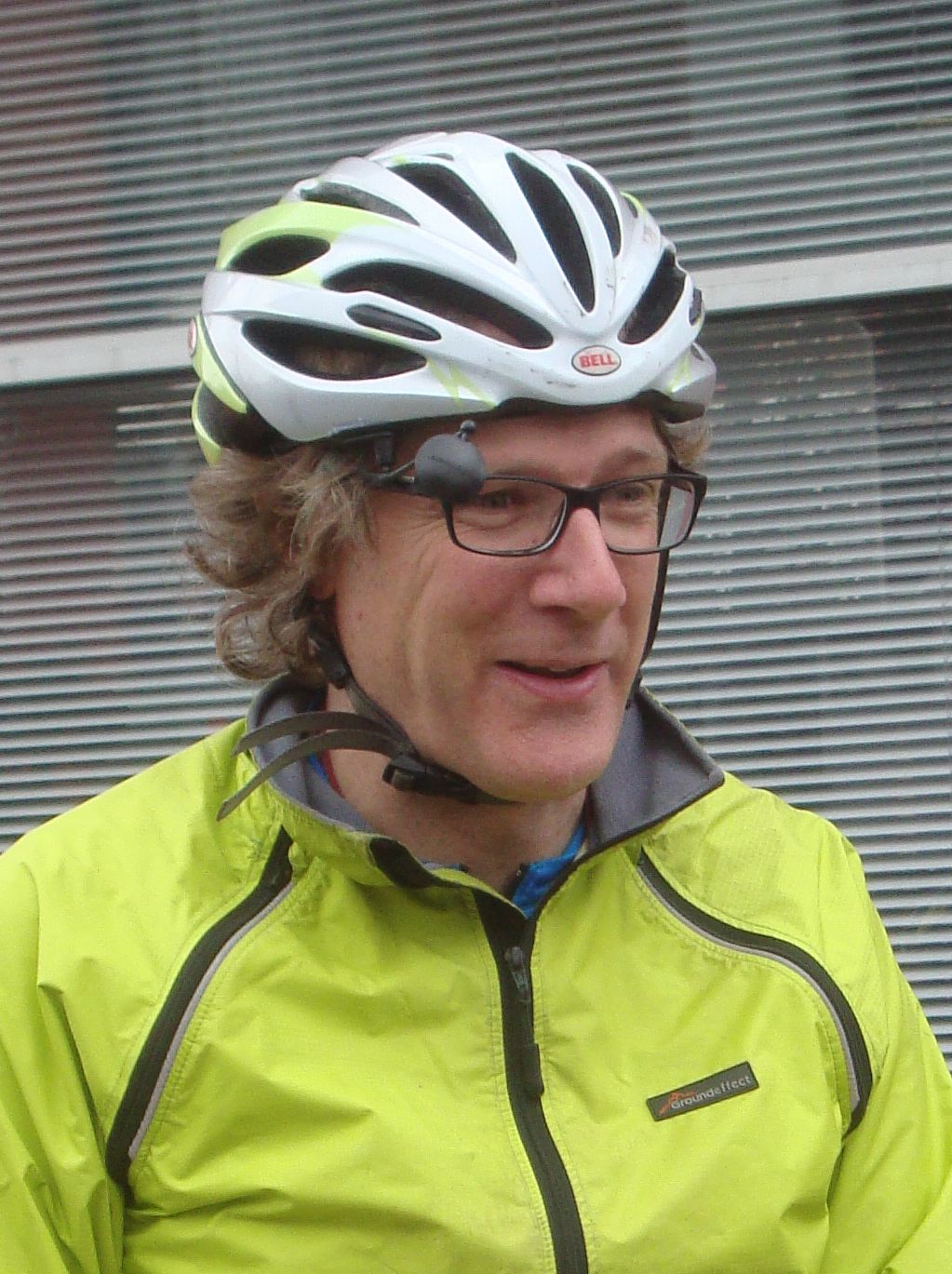
- Roger Sutton in August 2012
- Born: 1964 or 1965 (age 61–62)
- Education: University of Canterbury
- Occupation: Energy sector
- Years active: since 1988
- Employer: Canterbury Earthquake Recovery Authority
- Spouse: Jo Malcolm
- Children: 3
- Relatives: Robyn Malcolm (sister in law)

Roger Sutton (born 1964 or 1965) is a business leader in Christchurch, New Zealand. He was chief executive of power lines company Orion New Zealand Limited from 2003 until 13 June 2011, when he commenced as CEO of the Canterbury Earthquake Recovery Authority. He resigned in 2014 after being found guilty of serious misconduct by the State Services Commission.

== Professional career ==
Sutton grew up in Wellington, Gisborne and Hamilton. He graduated in 1986 from the University of Canterbury with a Bachelor of Engineering (Mechanical).

=== Energy sector ===
Sutton began his career with the Electricity Corporation of New Zealand (ECNZ) as a mechanical engineer at New Plymouth Power Station in 1987. From 1988 to 1989, he worked for ECNZ as a business analyst. From 1996 to 1998, he was general manager trading at Southpower, the electricity generation and distribution arm of Christchurch City Council.

As a consequence of Max Bradford's reform of the electricity sector, Southpower had to be split, and Sutton remained with the energy distribution part of one of its successors, Orion New Zealand Ltd, majority-owned by Christchurch City Holdings. From 1998 to 2002, he was general manager commercial at Orion. In December 2002, he was appointed general manager operations. In early March 2003, he became acting CEO of Orion, and took the position of CEO on 1 May 2003, being responsible for 500 staff. In 2011, his salary was $700k. As of May 2011, he is chairman of Connetics, a fully owned Orion subsidiary. He is chair of the Energy Efficiency and Conservation Authority.

In the late 1990s, Sutton was a member of the New Zealand Energy Market rules committee and the market rules structure groups. During 2001, Sutton was seconded to the office of the Minister of Energy, Pete Hodgson, during the country's electricity crisis.

=== Canterbury Earthquake Recovery Authority ===
On 12 May 2011, Earthquake Recovery Minister Gerry Brownlee announced Sutton as the first permanent CEO of the Canterbury Earthquake Recovery Authority (CERA). The appointment was for a five-year period. Sutton replaced the interim CEO John Ombler. On 13 June 2011, Sutton commenced the new role, which had a remuneration of $500k. The new role, where he had a staff of about 50, paid $200k less than his previous role at Orion.

Sutton's appointment was widely praised and welcomed from all sectors of society, with the popularity gained by Sutton's reaction to the way power was restored, staff praised and information communicated after the February 2011 Christchurch earthquake. Christchurch mayor Bob Parker said that Sutton "would be very popular". The CEO of the Canterbury Employers' Chamber of Commerce, Peter Townsend, said it was the "most important Government appointment of the year" and that Sutton had all the right attributes for the job. The Central City Business Association manager Paul Lonsdale said that Sutton had shown through his reaction to three earthquakes (this counts the Boxing Day aftershock as a separate event) that he was very pragmatic.

The chairman of the Canterbury Communities' Earthquake Recovery Network (CanCERN), Tom McBrearty, said that Sutton "brings two key ingredients – leadership around business and emphatic values around the community." Labour MP Ruth Dyson, whose Port Hills electorate covers the area in east Christchurch worst affected by the last earthquake, said that Sutton was the perfect choice and gave him "12 out of 10".

Sutton was first suggested to lead the city's rebuild by former mayor Garry Moore and Wigram MP Jim Anderton in early March 2011. In 2011 he was an award winner at the Energy Excellence Awards for outstanding contribution to the sector.

=== Resignation ===
Sutton resigned as CEO of CERA on 17 November 2014, after a complaint from a female staffer about inappropriate behaviour. An investigation by the States Services Commission found Sutton guilty of 'serious misconduct' but did not recommend that he should be dismissed. State Services Commissioner Iain Rennie subsequently came under fire for his handling of the investigation. He allowed Sutton to give his version of events at a press conference announcing his resignation - even though Sutton and the complainant were both bound by a confidentiality agreement. Several high-level Government officials also attended the press conference giving the impression that the Government supported Sutton.

== Family ==
Sutton is married to the former journalist Jo Malcolm. They have three sons. Actress Robyn Malcolm is his sister in law.
