= St Mary's Catholic Church, Hokitika =

St Mary's Catholic Church
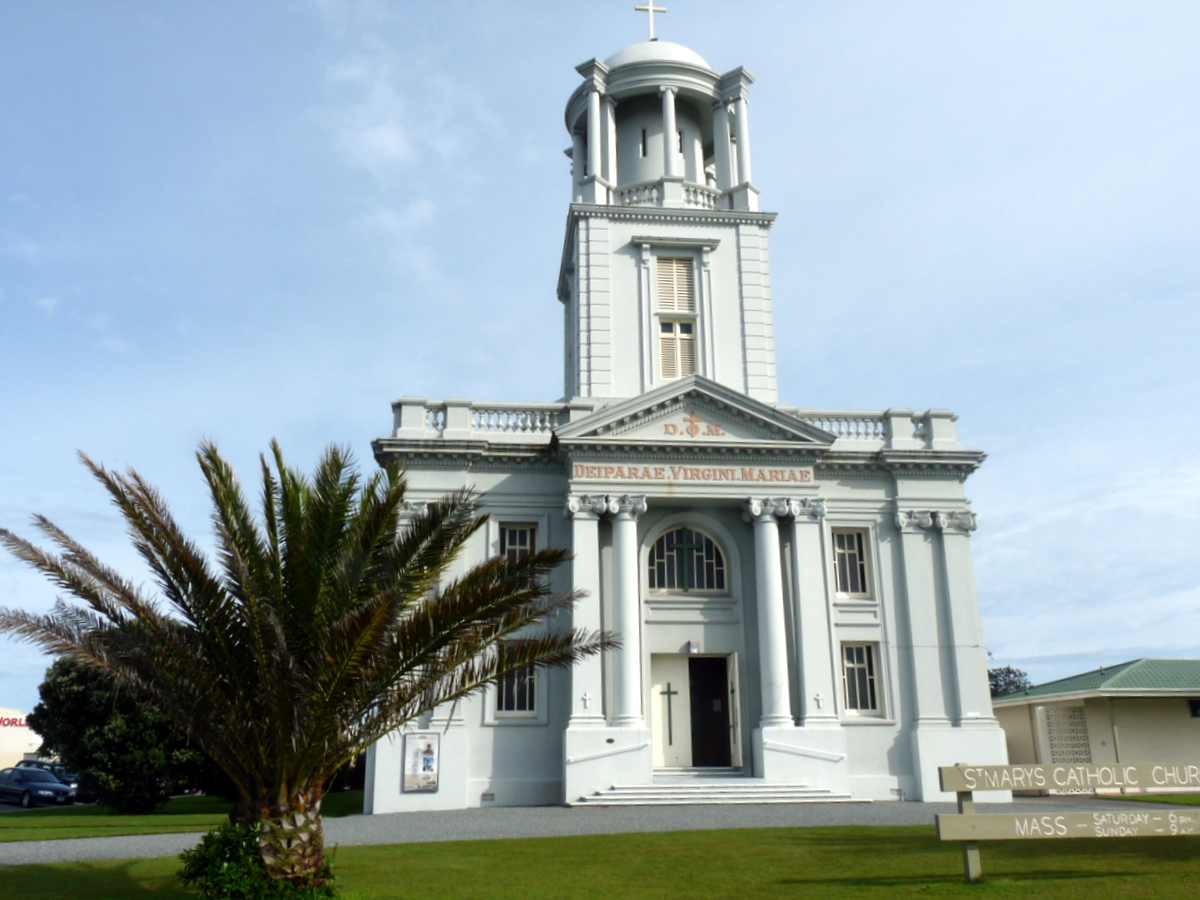
- St Mary's Catholic Church
- 42°42′58″S 170°57′54″E
- Location: 71 Sewell Street, Hokitika
- Country: New Zealand
- Denomination: Catholic

History
- Status: Parish church

Architecture
- Functional status: Closed to the public
- Architect: Sidney and Alfred Luttrell
- Architectural type: Neoclassical
- Groundbreaking: 1914
- Completed: 1928

Specifications
- Materials: Plastered brick

Administration
- Archdiocese: Wellington
- Diocese: Christchurch
- Parish: Hokitika St Mary's

Heritage New Zealand – Category 1
- Designated: 2 April 2004
- Reference no.: 1705

St Mary's Catholic Church in Hokitika, New Zealand, is a Roman Catholic church. It is a landmark on the country's West Coast.

== Background ==
Irish Catholics, mostly miners attracted to the West Coast by its natural resources, made up a large proportion of the area's population. A 2.5-acre (1.0 ha) Roman Catholic Reserve was designated for the Catholic community in the town's survey, bordered by Tancred, Stafford, and Sewell streets. Church buildings with Saint Mary as the patron saint were built on this reserve in 1865 and, when it soon proved too small, in 1866. In 1912, the former church was in poor condition.

== Architecture and construction ==
The parish building committee resolved on 15 July 1912 that a call be made for tender and specification for a new church. A Greymouth architect, John Thomas Watson, prepared a concept design for the parish in Roman or neoclassical architecture. This was a departure from Gothic architecture that had been prevailing until then, and was guided by the architectural style chosen for the Christchurch Basilica that had been consecrated in 1905. Alfred Luttrell of the Luttrell brothers won the tender for the detailed design and construction of the church, and the Luttrells were guided by Watson's work but introduced significantly different aspects.

The 1866 church was demolished in February 1914. Bishop John Grimes laid the foundation stone on 23 March 1914. The new church occupied the site of the previous church, but with the entrance facing Sewell instead of Tancred Street. The nave of the church was first used on Christmas Eve in 1914. Owing to the outbreak of World War I and funding difficulties, it was not until 1920–21 that the portico and tower were added. The portico is adorned with the Latin phrase Deiparae Virgini Mariae ("Mother Virgin Mary") and the abbreviation D.O.M., which refers to the Latin phrase Deo optimo maximo ("to the greatest and best God").

Internally, the church is simpler and less decorated than its exterior, but this is typical of other neoclassical basilicas built in Canterbury during the same period. The interior includes a large organ and choir loft cantilevered above the nave.

The church was built in double brick, but it was not until 1927/28 that plaster was applied, and the building achieved its final appearance.

== Current status ==
In 2004, the church, which belongs to the Roman Catholic Diocese of Christchurch, was registered by the New Zealand Historic Places Trust (now Heritage New Zealand) as a Category I structure, with registration number 1705.

Following a structural assessment triggered by the February 2011 Christchurch earthquake, the church was closed to the public in June 2012.

== Gallery ==
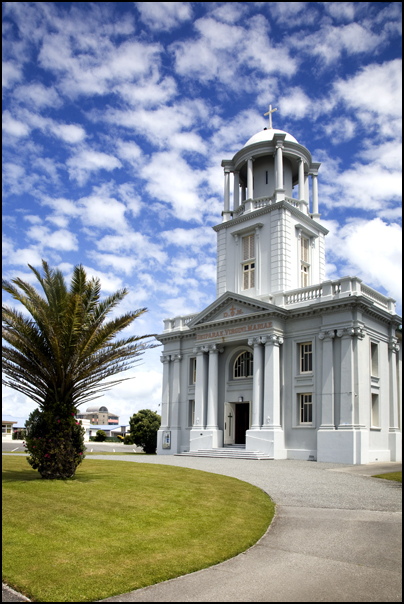

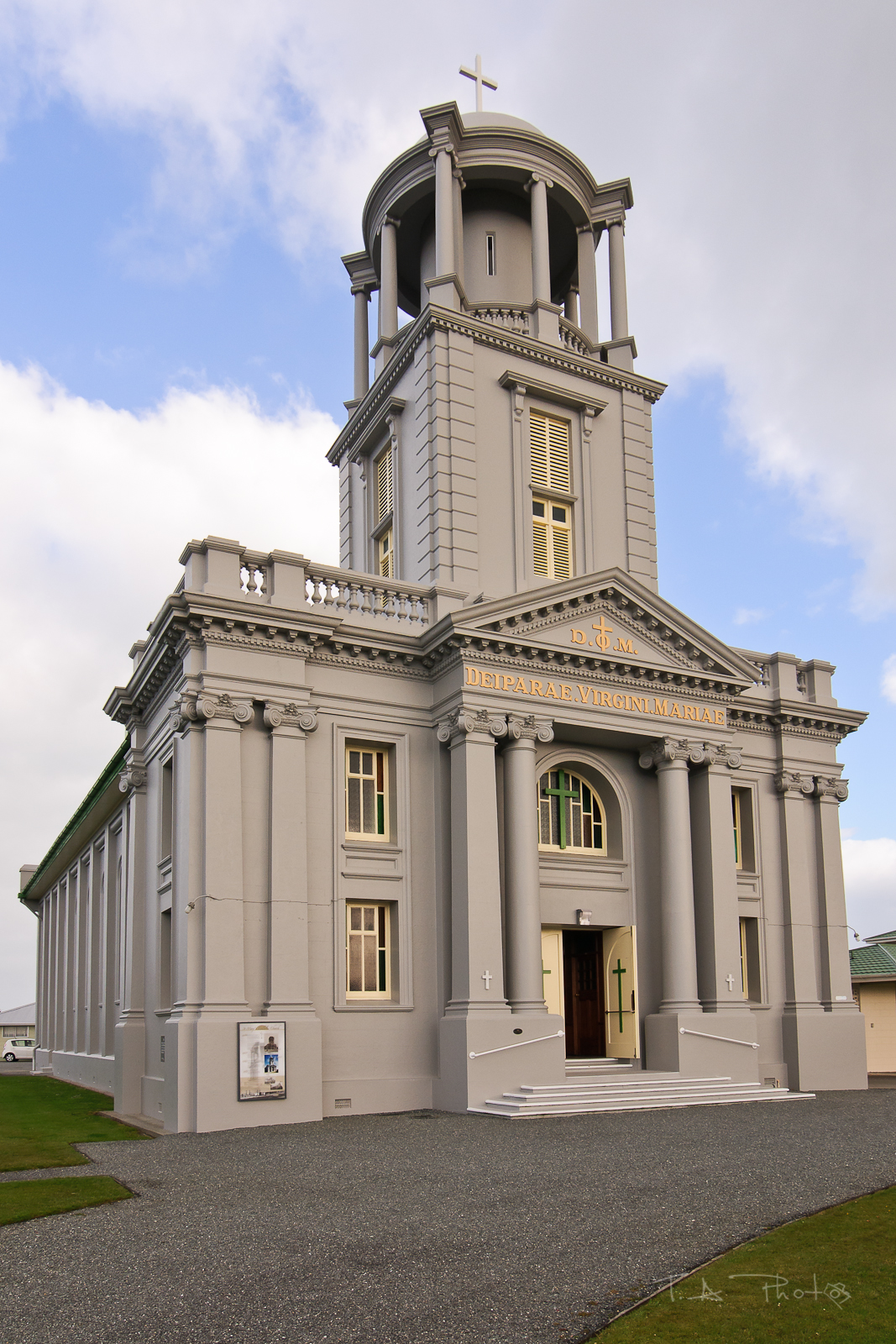

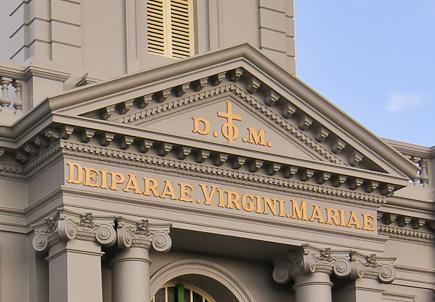

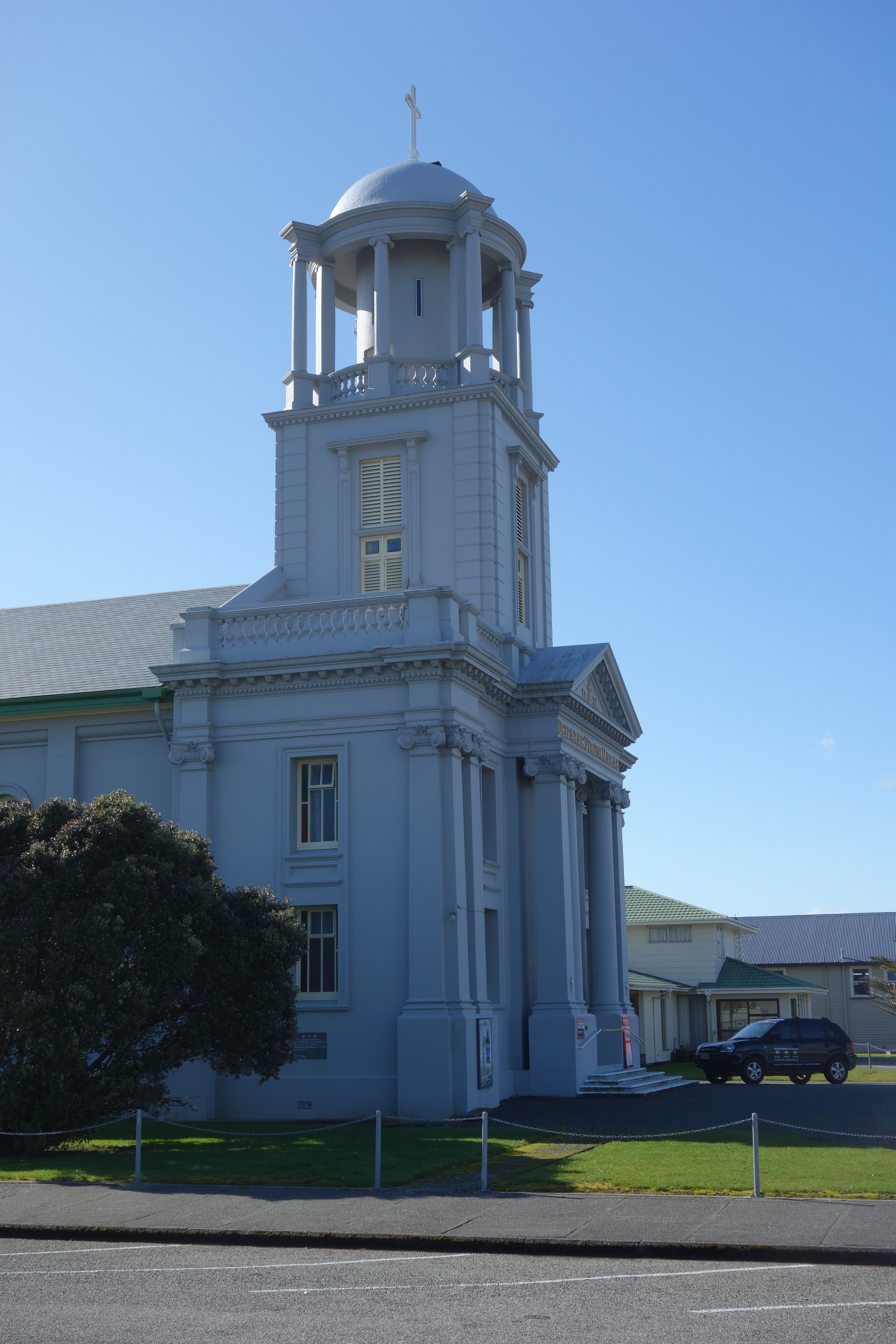

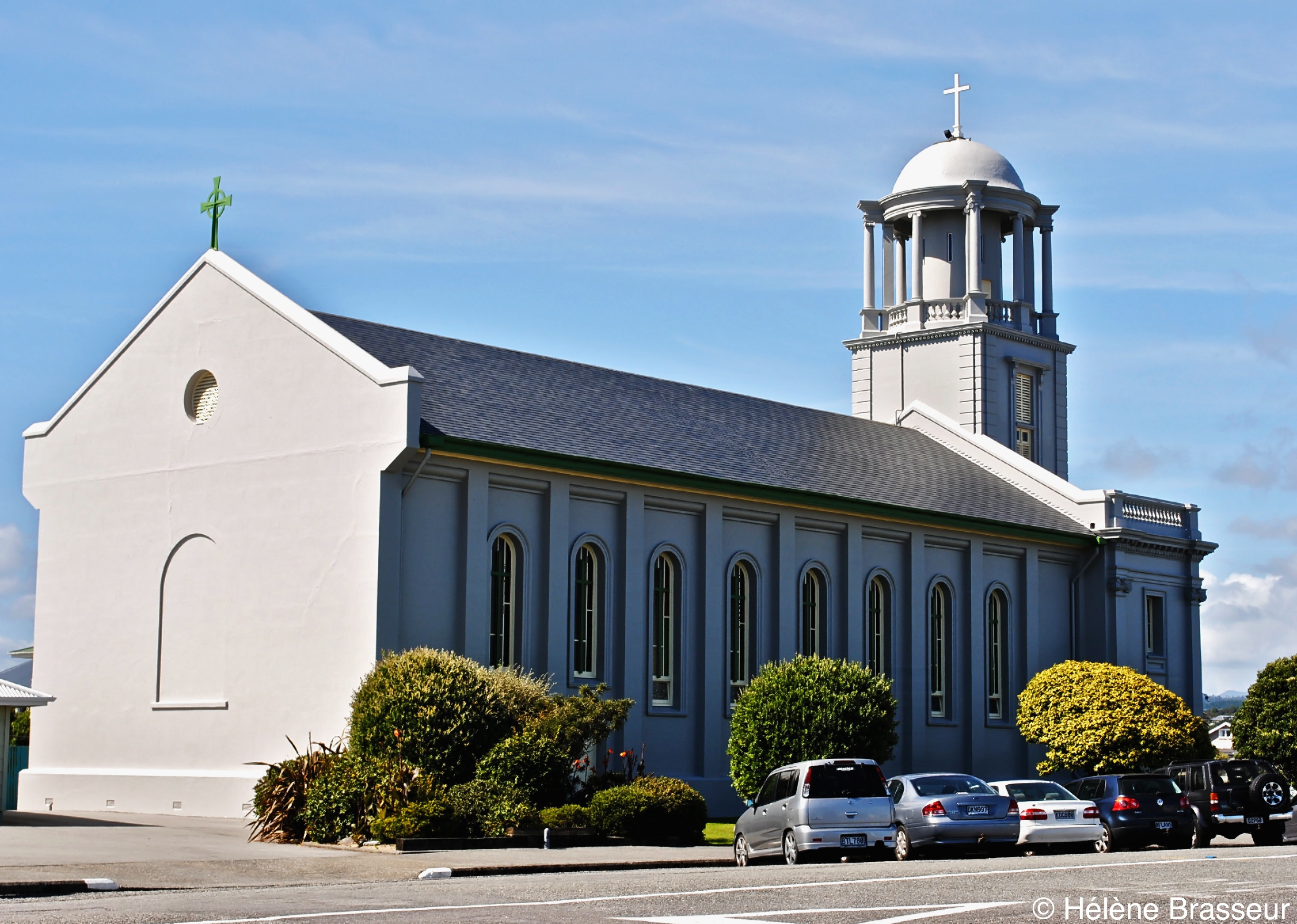

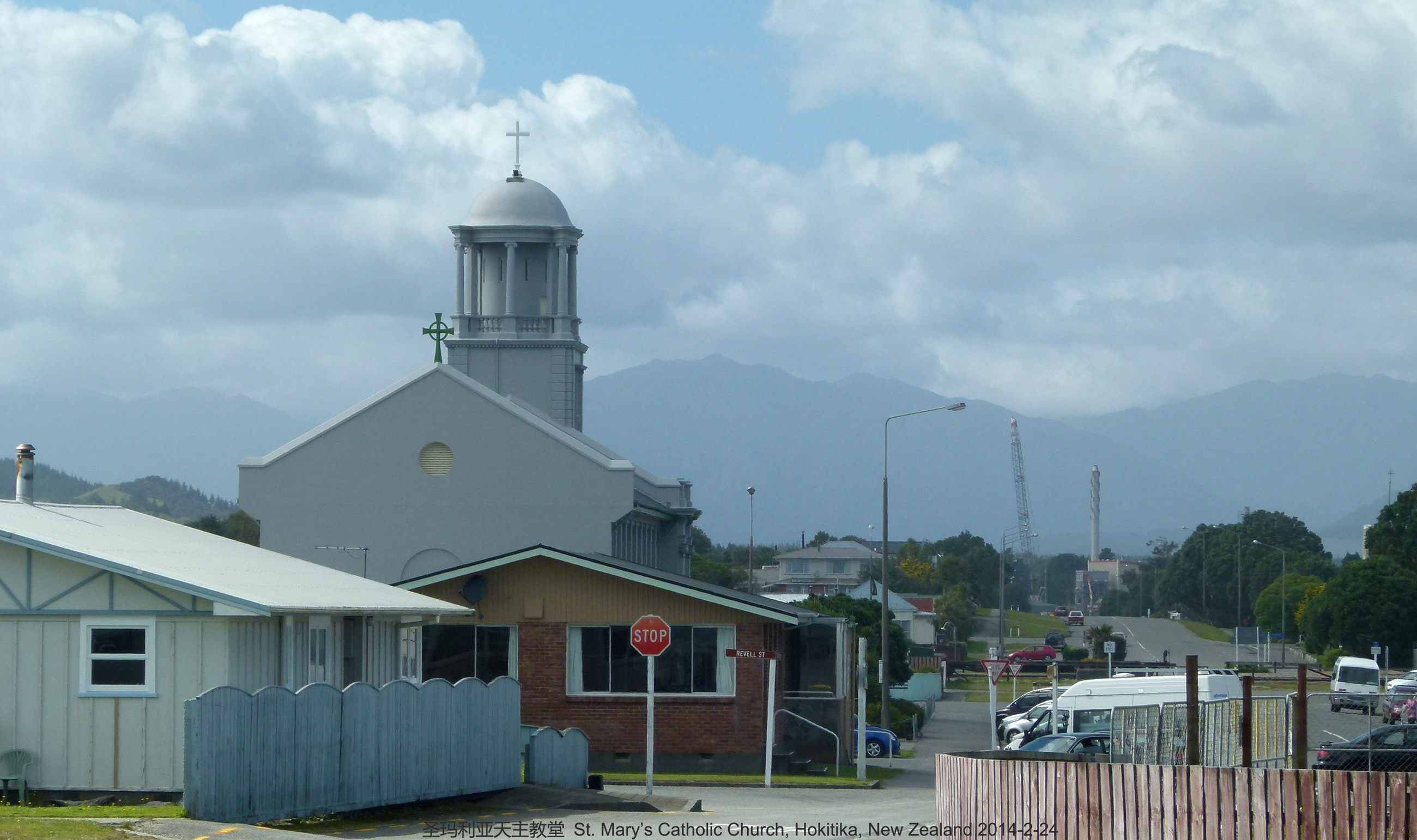

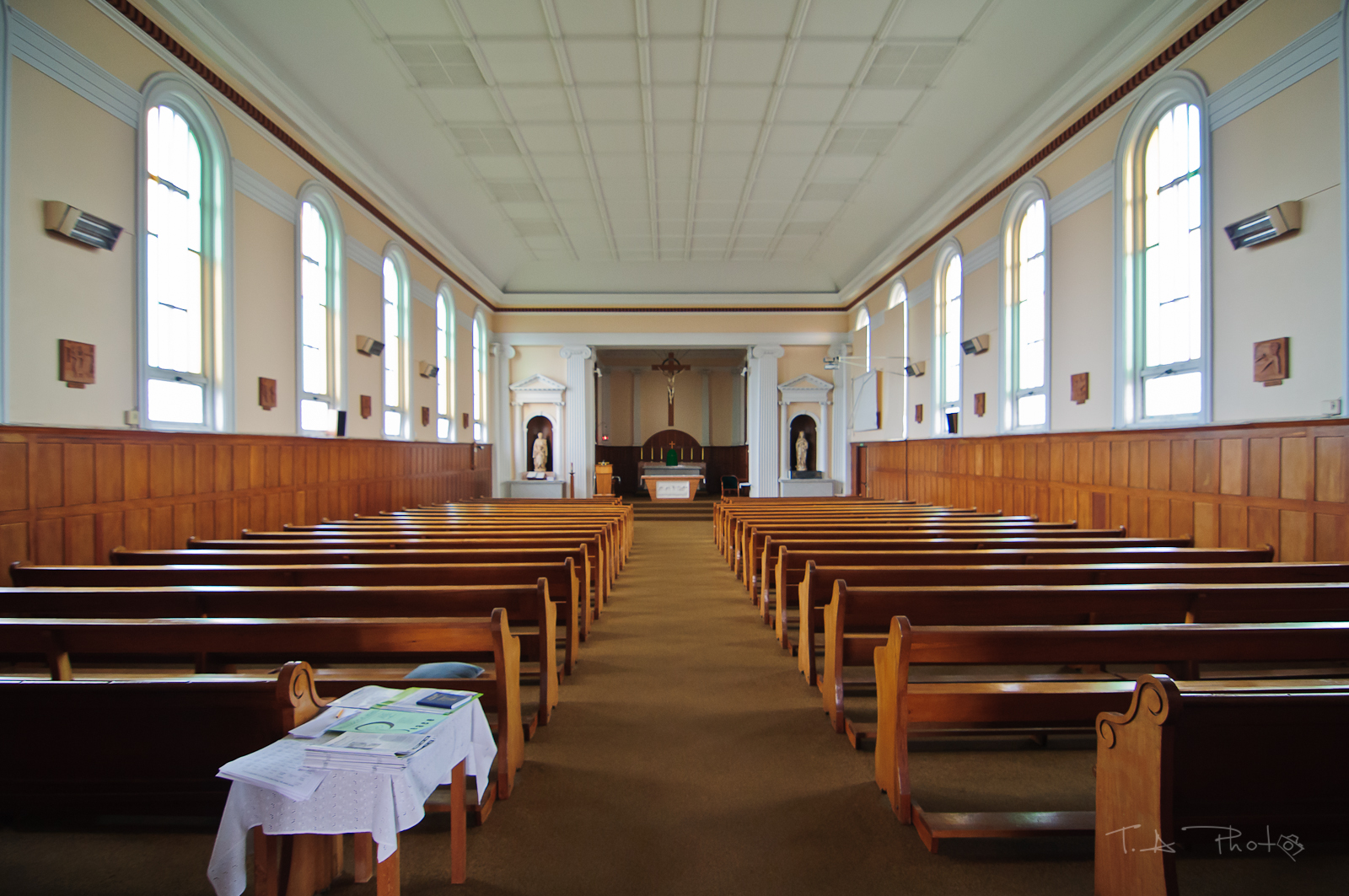
