= Orion New Zealand =

New Zealand electric utility

Orion
- Industry: Electricity distribution
- Predecessor: Southpower
- Founded: December 1998
- Headquarters: Christchurch, New Zealand
- Key people: Rob Jamieson, CEO
- Website: Official website

Orion New Zealand Limited (Orion) is an electricity distribution company, based in Christchurch, New Zealand.

The company was formed under its current name in December 1998. Orion is owned by Christchurch City Council (89.3%) and Selwyn District Council (10.7%). In 2013, Orion posted a $49m profit, with $32m in dividends going to the shareholding councils. Roger Sutton was CEO until he resigned to become CEO of the Canterbury Earthquake Recovery Authority on 13 June 2011.

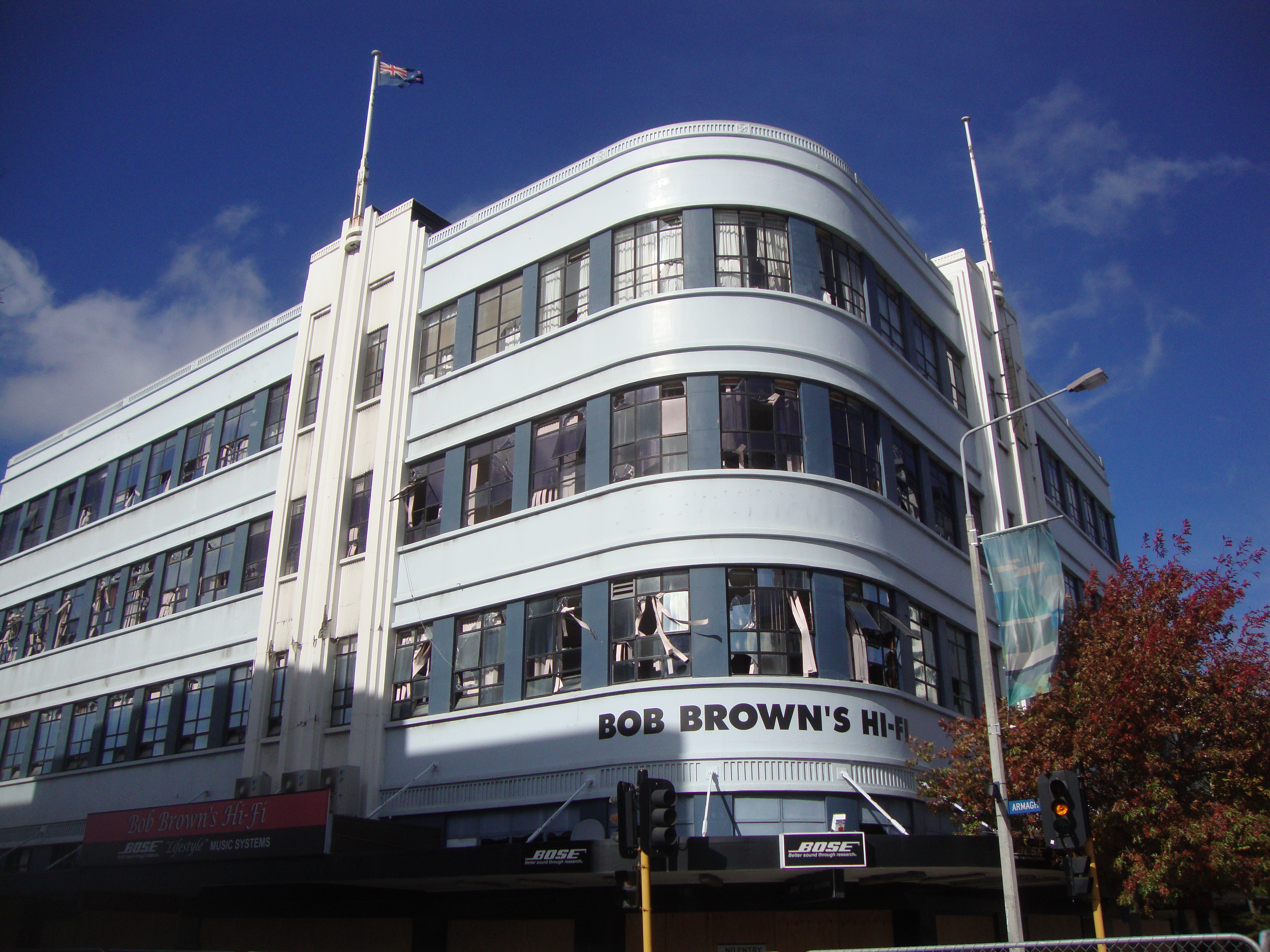
Former Orion Building in Christchurch (since demolished)

Orion is responsible for electricity distribution in Christchurch and the Selwyn District, bounded to the north and south by the Waimakariri and Rakaia Rivers and to the east and west by the Southern Alps and the Pacific Ocean respectively. Within this region, it delivers 3,165 gigawatt-hours of electricity per year to 190,000 customers.

== History ==
Prior to 1989, electricity distribution and retailing in Christchurch and Selwyn was the responsibility of four entities: the Christchurch City Council Municipal Electricity Department (MED), Riccarton Electricity, the Port Hills Energy Authority, and the Central Canterbury Electric Power Board. In 1989, all four companies entered a joint venture, named Southpower.

The 1998 electricity sector reforms required all electricity companies to separate their distribution and retailing businesses. Southpower retained its distribution business and sold its retail business to Meridian Energy. In December 1998, the lines business was renamed Orion New Zealand.

== Electricity network ==
The Orion network consists of over 11,000 kilometres (6,800 mi) of lines and cables, 52 zone substations, 10,972 distribution substations and 10,828 transformers. Orion takes power from seven Transpower grid exit points (from east to west): Bromley, Islington, Kimberley, Hororata, Coleridge, Castle Hill and Arthur's Pass. The majority of Christchurch is served by a 66 kV subtransmission network and an 11 kV distribution network. Some western parts of Christchurch, Banks Peninsula and the Selwyn district are served by a mixture of 66 kV and 33 kV subtransmission and 11 kV distribution. As is standard in New Zealand, electricity is delivered to homes at 230/400 volts (phase-to-neutral/phase-to-phase).

Orion New Zealand Limited network statistics for the year ending 31 March 2024
Parameter	Value
Regulatory asset base	$1,566 million
Line charge revenue	$238.1 million
Capital expenditure	$136.9 million
Operating expenditure	$81.6 million
Customer connections	223,047
Energy delivered	3,479 GWh
Peak demand	692 MW
Total line length	11,992 km
Distribution and low-voltage overhead lines	4,834 km
Distribution and low-voltage underground cables	6,504 km
Subtransmission lines and cables (66/33 kV)	654 km
Poles	87,065
Distribution transformers	12,156
Zone substation transformers	81
Interruption duration (SAIDI)	85 minutes
Interruption frequency (SAIFI)	0.71

=== Network development ===
Orion's distribution network suffered significant damage following the 2011 Christchurch earthquake, especially in the eastern suburbs of Christchurch. In addition, new post-earthquake developments in the northern and southwestern suburbs of Christchurch and the Rolleston-Lincoln area of the Selwyn district are increasing demand on the network in those areas.

The liquefaction from the 2011 earthquake damaged the New Brighton zone substation and the duplicated 66 kV cables linking Dallington and New Brighton zone substations with the Bromley GXP beyond repair. As a temporary solution to get power into the northeastern suburbs, a transformer was brought in to replace New Brighton zone substation and single 66 kV overhead lines were constructed to link the New Brighton transformer and Dallington zone substation to Bromley. To backup the single line supplies, four 1 MW diesel generators were installed at Queen Elizabeth II Park.

A new zone substation was built in the Rawhiti Domain to replace New Brighton zone substation, with the temporary overhead line extended to reach it. Replacement single 66 kV cables from Bromley to Dallington and Rawhiti were completed in 2015, allowing the temporary overhead lines to be removed. A new single 66 kV cable was also constructed from Dallington to the McFaddens Road zone substation in Saint Albans to provide a second supply route for Dallington.

With the increasing demand in the northern suburbs, a new zone substation was constructed at Waimakariri Road in Harewood, connected to Papanui (Greers Road) zone substation by a single 66 kV cable. This offloaded the northwestern suburbs of Christchurch from Papanui. To secure a second supply to both Waimakariri and Rawhiti zone substations, a new single 66 kV cable will be constructed to link them via Marshland. This will allow the QEII Park generators to be removed and reinstalled in the Belfast area to secure supply in the northern suburbs. Eventually, a new zone substation at Marshland will be built to offload some northern suburbs from Papanui.

This excludes the 22kv transmission lines around Coutts Island and Kainga areas which are supplied by MainPower.

== Subsidiaries ==
- Connetics Limited, electrical contracting business

== See also ==
- Electricity sector in New Zealand
