= Kaisik Wong =

Chinese-American fashion designer

- Born: 1950; San Francisco, California, U.S.
- Died: July 13, 1990 (aged 39–40); San Francisco, California, U.S.
- Occupation: Fashion designer

Kaisik Wong (1950 – July 13, 1990) was a Chinese-American fashion designer. He was best known for his patchwork vest, which was plagiarized for Balenciaga's Spring/Summer 2002 collection.

Wong emerged from San Francisco wearable art movement in the early 1970s and was active until his death from leukemia in 1990. He created avant-garde garments for celebrities such as Salvador Dalí, Anjelica Huston, Elton John, and Tina Turner. His clothing was sold at Henri Bendel, I. Magnin, and Obiko.

== Life and career ==
Wong was born and raised in San Francisco's Chinatown neighborhood. His father was an accountant and his mother a homemaker from New Orleans. By the age of 14, Wong was silk-screening fabrics and making his own clothes, shoes, and accessories. At the urging of his art teacher, Wong dropped out of high school at 15 and studied at the Pacific Fashion Institute in San Francisco.

At 17 years old, Wong moved to New York where he worked with designer Adele Simpson in 1967. He traveled to Paris where he met Salvador Dalí, Yves Saint Laurent, Thierry Mugler, and Pierre Cardin. He turned down a position to work for Cardin. In the early 1970s, Wong returned to San Francisco to launch his own fashion label, Muuntux, which was sold in his own boutique until 1973. He made stage costumes for Tina Turner, Anjelica Huston, and Elton John.

Wong collaborated with filmmaker Steven F. Arnold, protégé of Salvador Dalí, to create costumed for the Cockettes. This led to collaborations with Dali himself. Wong created costumes for Dali and exhibited his creations at the opening of Dalí Theatre and Museum in Figueras, Spain in 1974. Wong often appeared in public dressed in full costume as a mythological Chinese trickster called the Monkey King, a role he played for Dali.

Wong's aesthetic was described as "bridging a prevalent gap between the hippie movement and an era of glam-rock." His designs were often inspired by ancient civilizations, incorporating kimono, tunics, tapestries, and the embroideries and appliques of South America and Asia. He also fused futurism with mythic themes. His garments were entirely handmade without any use of patterns. His partner Jesus Santiago also designed with him. 1978 interview for New York Magazine, Kwon quotes Wong's own words that his clothing served a purpose: “The idea is to get people together and get them in touch with the changing of the seasons. The clothes in the collection are merely functional versions of what we do in the theater.”

Wong worked for the San Francisco art-to-wear boutique Obiko, owned and operated by Sandra Sakata where he made one-of-a-kind pieces. In 1977, he created a ready-to-wear collection under the Pitash Rhok label that was available at I. Magnin. He also produced garments for Henri Bendel. Wong designed the costumes for the 1981 film Fruits of Passion, directed by Shūji Terayama and starring Klaus Kinski.

Wong, who was HIV positive, died of leukemia at age 40 on July 13, 1990 at St. Luke's hospital. He is buried at Holy Cross Catholic Cemetery in Colma, California.

From December 1995 to March 1996, the exhibit True Couture: The Wearable Art of Kasik Wong was on display at the M.H. de Young Memorial Museum in San Francisco.

In 2002, Balenciaga designer Nicolas Ghesquière was forced to admit he copied a design from Wong for his Spring/Summer 2002 collection. The design was a 1973 patchwork vest that appeared in a 1974 reference book Native Funk & Flash. "I'm very flattered that people are looking at my sources of inspiration. This is how I work. I've always said I'm looking at vintage clothes." Ghesquière said. After the controversy, Cameron Silver's vintage boutique Decades on Melrose Avenue in Los Angeles celebrated the work of Wong. Silver assembled Live the Fantasy, a retrospective exhibit and sale of pieces from the Wong family collection. The patchwork vest was the only garment not for sale, it was later included in the exhibition Iconic to Ironic: Fashioning California Identity at the Oakland Museum of California.
