= Free Theatre Christchurch =

Theatre company in New Zealand

Free Theatre Christchurch in Christchurch, New Zealand, was established in 1979, and is New Zealand’s longest running producer of avant-garde experimental theatre. Peter Falkenberg is the theatre's Founder and Artistic Director.

== History ==
The Free Theatre was established by a group of students and staff from the University of Canterbury in 1979. Through experimentation in performance, they aimed to create a new, entertaining and vibrant theatre in Christchurch. The company's Mission Statement reads "to stage old and new rarely staged European plays in original translations, new New Zealand plays, and classical English texts in an unusual and experimental style". The name Free Theatre was chosen in homage to European predecessors Freie Bühne in Germany and Théâtre Libre in France, groups who were striving for productions to be free from social, political and aesthetic conventions.

In 1982, Free Theatre registered as an incorporated society That same year they built a 100-seat theatre in the Christchurch Arts Centre, Christchurch, as a space for their experimentation. It was originally known as the Free Theatre and later became called the University Theatre. The Free Theatre has served as a launching pad for a number of other groups (Pacific Underground for example) and supported a number of smaller groups to present new work. In 2008, to celebrate the company's contribution to Christchurch, bringing together past and present members, the arts editor of the Christchurch Press wrote: "For quarter of a century Free Theatre has refined cultural horizons and shaped Christchurch's perceptions of contemporary theatre".

In February 2011, the 2011 Christchurch earthquake destroyed several theatre work spaces used by Free Theatre. Due to damage from the earthquake, both the University Theatre and Nibelheim have been deemed inaccessible, while Old Queens Theatre has been demolished. However the company has continued to produce a number of productions – The Earthquake in Chile, Hereafter, and Canterbury Tales, Free Theatre members have also been involved in post-earthquake initiatives such as Gap Filler, Greening the Rubble and Arts Voice.

In May 2014, Free Theatre in collaboration with Arts Circus signed a two-year lease for The Gym, taking up the first arts-practice tenancy in the new Arts Centre. Here they presented a series of Ubu Nights and major productions including a season of Kafka's Amerika, The Black Rider, Footprints/Tapuwae, The Mauricio Kagel Project, Frankenstein and Alice.

After filming the company over several years New Zealand filmmaker Shirley Horrocks released a documentary Free Theatre: 37 Years in the 2017 New Zealand International Film Festival.

In 2018, the Arts Centre Trust Board ended Free Theatre's lease.

In 2023, Free Theatre found a new home at the Climate Action Campus where they performed the first English language production of Caren Jeẞ's play The Cat Eleonore.

== Productions ==
In the 1980s, Free Theatre became known for a series of productions that included: Woyzeck, King Ubu, Round Dance, King Lear, The Joffongract, 1984, A Ride Across Lake Constance, Cowboy Mouth, The Rise and Fall of the City of Mahagonny and Lulu.

The Free Theatre Group also staged a number of cabarets in the 1980s, presented in what was known as Nibelheim, the basement space below Te Puna Toi and the SoFA Gallery in the Christchurch Arts Centre. This led to complaints from Arts Centre residents, who went to court with the aim to expel Free Theatre as tenants. The case was eventually thrown out of court.

In the 1990s, Free Theatre performed: Hamlet Machine, Salome, Medea Material, Crusoe, Murderer Hope of Woman/The Philosopher's Stone and Bakkhai/Diotek.

In the 2000s Free Theatre performed Last Days of Mankind, Footprints/Tapuwae, Samson Airline, Fantasia, Philoctetes, Diana Down Under, Ella and Susn, Faust Chroma, Distraction Camp, Doctor Faustus, The Earthquake in Chile, Hereafter, I Sing the Body Electric.

In 2009, Free Theatre released a feature-length film titled "Remake" based on the Parker–Hulme murder case.

Free Theatre often performs in non-traditional theatre spaces. The 2011 production The Earthquake in Chile was performed inside and around an Anglican church. Their 1999 production of Bakkhai/Diotek was performed in Ministry Nightclub. In 2012 Hereafter premiered in The Tannery, Woolston. In October 2013 as part of FESTA, Free Theatre took to the streets of Christchurch at night with the carnivalesque Canterbury Tales, a collaboration with local artists, hospitality and architectural schools from Christchurch, Auckland and Sydney.

Since 2023 they've performed a series of works at the historic Pumphouse in Phillipstown, including Woyzeck, The Deadbeat Opera and The Passionate Puritan.

== Training and education ==
Over the years a wide range of emerging and established artists, including poets, filmmakers, sculptors, writers, musicians, dancers and actors, have collaborated within the Free Theatre to perform in various spaces around the North and South Island of New Zealand. From the start, the emphasis of Free Theatre's work has been on non-verbal action and high production standards, discouraging the star system and encouraging long rehearsal and training periods in a company context.

In most cases, Free Theatre productions are 'physical theatre' in the sense that the starting point for each actor is not psychology (as in naturalism) but the body and voice. Training is therefore ongoing, even when no project is currently in rehearsal. The exercises used in training have evolved from a diverse range of sources, including the theory and practice of Vsevolod Meyerhold, Bertolt Brecht, Jerzy Grotowski, Peter Brook, Richard Schechner, Augusto Boal, Eugenio Barba and Tadashi Suzuki.

The success of the Free Theatre in the 1980s led to the development of a dedicated drama programme at the University of Canterbury in 1988. In 1997, it gained department status becoming Theatre and Film Studies and was the first in the country to run a postgraduate programme in theatre and film. Recent publications by Free Theatre members on Free Theatre work include Ryan Reynolds Moving Targets, Emma Johnston's Healing Maori Through Song and Dance and Marian McCurdy's Acting and its Refusal in Theatre and Film

Free Theatre runs classes in Pataphysical Theatre, a physical theatre training and devising programme.

== Awards and honors ==
Free Theatre have received the following awards and nominations:

- 2012 Best Theatre (I Sing the Body Electric), The Press 'Best Of the Year: Theatre'
- 2012 'Get to Adelaide Fringe' Award (Hereafter), Dunedin Fringe Festival
- 2009 Nominee for The Montana Award, Most Original Production (Faust Chroma), Chapman Tripp NZ Theatre Awards
- 2009 Award for Best Theatre (Ella and Susn), Dunedin Fringe Festival
- 2009 Nominee for Best Production Design (Ella and Susn), Dunedin Fringe Festival
- 2009 Award for Best Production Design (Faust Chroma), Wellington Fringe Festival
- 2008 Award for Best Theatre (Faust Chroma), Dunedin Fringe Festival
- 2008 Nominee for Best Production Design (Faust Chroma), Dunedin Fringe Festival
