= K. Lee Manuel =

American fiber artist & painter (1936–2003)

K. Lee Manuel (1936–November 5, 2003) was an American fiber artist and painter. She was an important figure in the field of wearable art, also known as "artwear" and "art-to-wear." She is best known for her hand-painted feather collars, clothing, and accessories, including kimono.

Born in Loma Linda, California, she studied at the University of California, Los Angeles, and received her bachelor of fine arts from the San Francisco Art Institute. She lived and worked in Santa Cruz, California.
