= Coralie Winn =

New Zealand artist and community activist

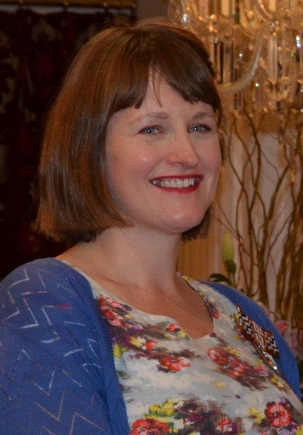
Winn in 2015

Coralie Diane Winn QSM is an urban arts director based in Christchurch, New Zealand. Following the 2010 Canterbury earthquake she co-founded Gap Filler, a community organisation to create arts spaces and activities in the city.

== Biography ==
Winn is originally from Adelaide, Australia. She moved to Christchurch and became involved in the performing and creative arts. She performed with the Free Theatre Christchurch, managed the SOFA public art gallery and was employed by the Christchurch Arts Centre as public programmes co-ordinator. Made redundant after the 2010 earthquake, Winn co-founded Gapfiller to focus on creating arts spaces in the city.

Winn was awarded the Queen's Service Medal, for services to the arts, in the 2015 New Year Honours.
