= Greening the Rubble =

New Zealand organisation

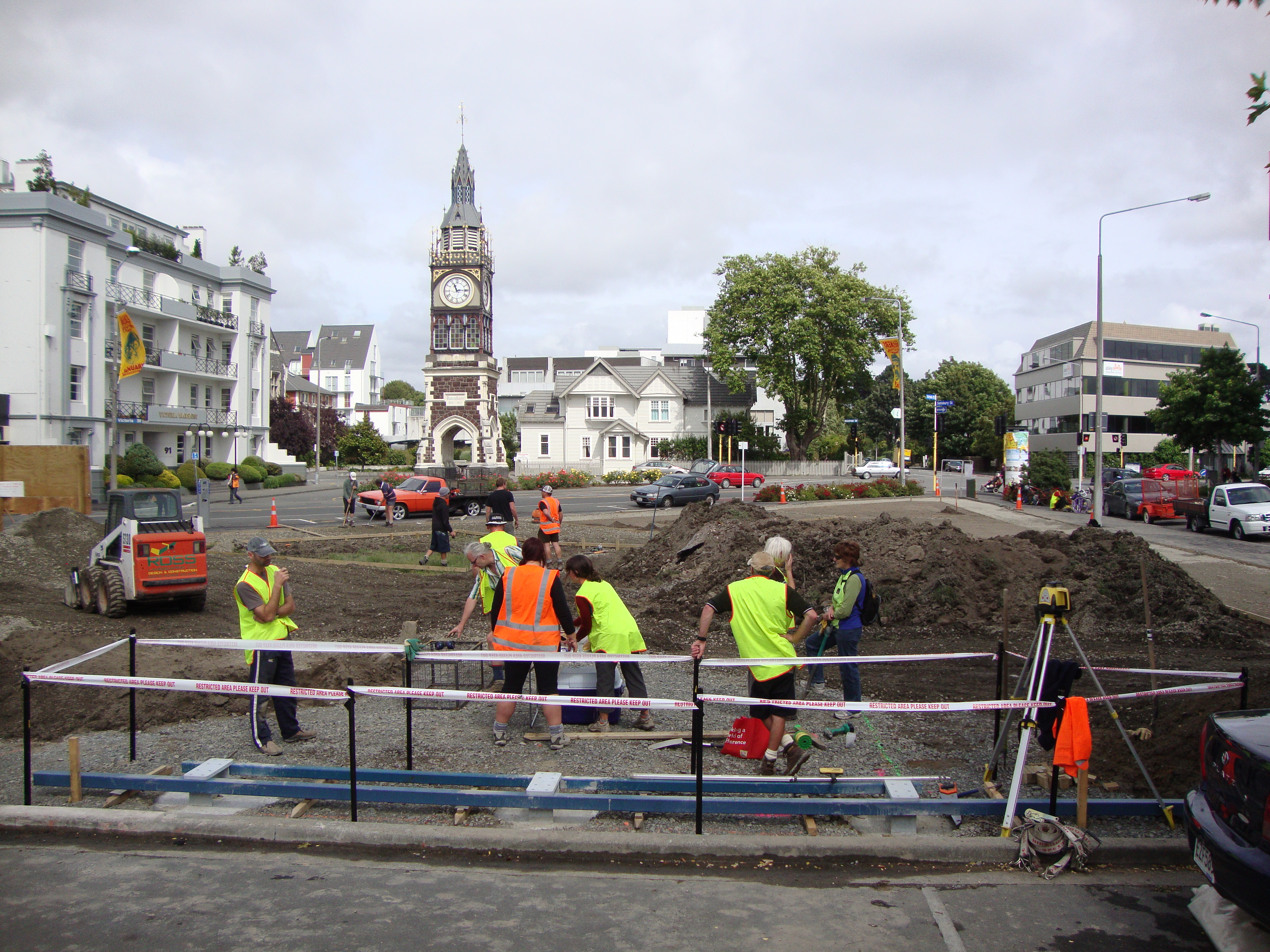
People working on the Victoria Street project, January 2011

The Green Lab, formerly known as Greening the Rubble, is an organisation in Christchurch, New Zealand. It was founded to create temporary gardens and parks in sites vacated after the 2010 and 2011 Canterbury earthquakes, due to building demolitions. The organisation made the sites useful until the property owners re-developed them. The Green Lab is funded through donations and sponsorships and is helped by volunteers, particularly students of high schools and Lincoln University's Landscape Architecture programme.

== History ==
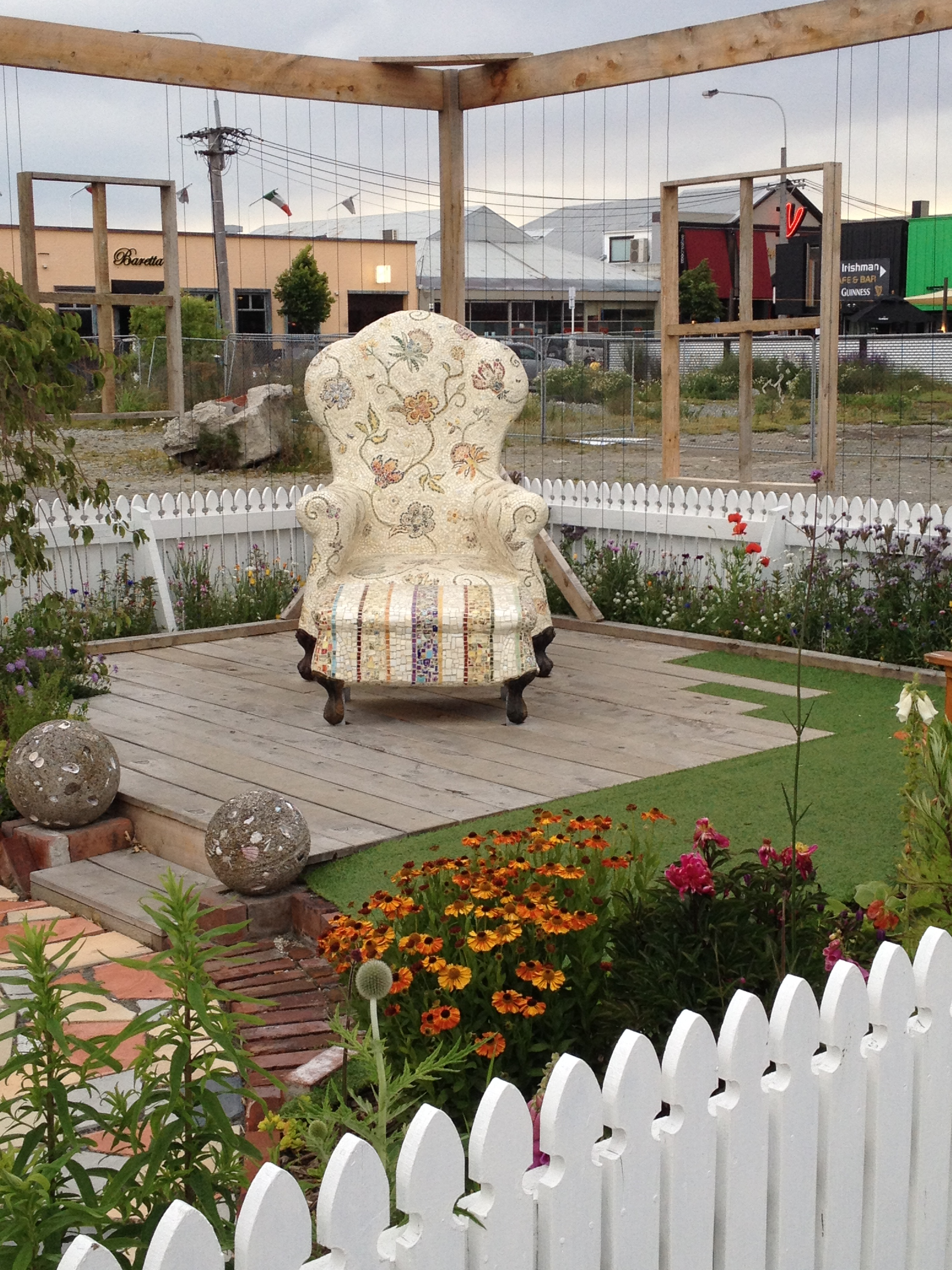
The Green Room in 2014, a project in Colombo Street. The chair, designed by Crack'd for Christchurch, used china that was broken in the earthquakes.

Greening the Rubble was formed in November 2010, one month after the 2010 Canterbury earthquake, with the intention of filling city spaces that had become vacant due to the quake. The group decided on filling the spaces with temporary projects involving landscaping, plants and biodiversity, similarly to what Gap Filler was doing but more focussed on nature. Their intention was that locals would later look after the gardens. One of the founding members was Roy Montgomery.

The organisation's first park was on the corner of Victoria and Salisbury streets, but it had to be closed after the February 2011 earthquake occurred as it became located in the Central City Red Zone; it took until May 2011 for it to be re-opened. In December the Greening the Rubble was removing the garden so that the property's owners could use it again. In July 2011 the Christchurch City Council gave Greening the Rubble and Gap Filler $100,000 in funding for at least eight projects. By June 2012 Greening the Rubble worked on ten projects.

In February 2013 Greening the Rubble and Gap Filler gifted Charles, Prince of Wales (later Charles III) the book Christchurch: The Transitional City Part IV. In May Greening the Rubble opened a plant exchange on Barbadoes Street so that owners of properties in the residential red zones who could not keep their pot plants, could give them away. At the time of its opening, the exchange was expected to be closed in winter. It was re-opened in February 2015 in another location: The Commons, in the central city.

In October 2013 Greening the Rubble and the Department of Conservation (DOC) opened the Nature Play Park near Latimer Square. A family park, it featured a small river, podocarp, beech and kōwhai trees. The land was leased from the Canterbury Earthquake Recovery Authority until June 2014; it was later used for the East Frame. During the October 2013 Festival of Transitional Architecture, Greening the Rubble and DOC volunteers hosted children's activities at the Nature Play Park. Also for the festival, a small park opened two months prior hosted Gap Filler's Sound Garden installation. In March 2014 Greening the Rubble participated in the Ellerslie Flower Show for the first time.

In October 2014 Greening the Rubble opened a 1,200-square-metre (13,000 sq ft) garden, the first of their Places of Tranquility, each based on six winning designs of a Lincoln University competition in 2012. This new garden was the organisation's biggest garden yet and featured Māori, Pasifika and Asian designs and flora, including a "whare-fale" and Japanese maples. The organisation planned on opening four more Gardens of Tranquility.

In February 2015 Greening the Rubble said that they had a shortage of land to use for their projects. In 2019 Greening the Rubble renamed to The Green Lab to reflect the city's moving on from earthquake recovery; around that time the organisation started producing what they call "indoor greening products". From September to October 2019 Christchurch library Tūranga had a "green connection pod", made by The Green Lab. In June 2024 Te Kohanga Taiao Sensory Nature Play Park was opened after The Green Lab and the Christchurch City Council collaborated on restoring an old playground in the residential red zone in Burwood.
