= Mioni =

Mioni is a surname of Italian origin. Notable people with the surname include:

- Fabrizio Mioni (1930–2020), Italian actor
- Mascha Mioni (born 1941), artist name of a Swiss painter and textile artist
