= Sandra Sakata =

American fashion designer

Sandra Akemi Sakata (August 24, 1940 – September 21, 1997) was an American fashion designer and fashion retailer.

She was a proponent of the art to wear movement and featured one-of-a-kind creations at her boutique Obiko. Which she co-founded in 1972 with Kaisik Wong, Alex Mate and Lee Brooks on Sacramento Street, San Francisco. She sought to showcase the work of artists she met in the San Francisco Bay Area. A Japanese-American, she was known for being an "exquisitely dressed" "dynamo" and who traveled in the Far East. In her apartment she displayed some the goods she found during her travels.

== Background ==
Sakata was born in Watsonville, California in 1940. She spent her early years in the Poston internment camp in Arizona following the enforcement of Executive Order 9066.

Sakata graduated from California State University, Chico and received a teaching certificate from the University of Hawaiʻi. She worked as a flight attendant for Pan Am for six years before returning to San Francisco. In the mid-1970s she "found her true metier" and became a boutique owner.

== Life and career ==
The Obiko boutique featured avantgarde window displays and sold the works of many San Francisco designers. Items sold included tie-dyed dresses, handwoven scarves, hand-painted jackets and handcrafted jewelry. "I had met so many talented artists in San Francisco, and I wanted to showcase their work", Sakata recounted in a 1995 interview. "I didn't want to just line the clothes up on a rack. I created a total environment of paintings, antiques, sculpture and flowers to set a mood for the clothing and jewelry."

Sakata played an important role in promoting the wearable art movement. She both inspired and mentored designers to produce jewelry, hand knits, woven fabrics, and hand-dyed silks inspired by ethnic influences worldwide. Some of those pieces became emblematic of the "art-to-wear" movement. These designs were included at the flagship store, located on Sutter Street near Union Square. She expanded Obiko in 1983 with an outpost at the Bergdorf Goodman store in New York, which closed in 1997.

== Death ==
Sakata died of breast cancer at her home in San Francisco on September 21, 1997 at age 57. She was survived by her mother, her brother and a niece and nephew.

== Legacy ==
One of Jean Cacicedo's shibori designs is called "For Sandra" in homage to Sakata and Obiko. In 2014 the aforementioned Cacicedo along with Ana Lisa Hedstrom, fiber artist and former colleague at Obiko, compiled an archive of the artists and the work they made during their time at the boutique. It was presented at the Biennial Symposium for the Textile Society of America.This archive documents the Art Wear Movement in Obiko from the 1980s to the 1990s.
