= Janet Lipkin =

American clothing designer, artist, educator (b. 1948)

- Born: Janet Iva Lipkin; July 24, 1948 (age 76); Jersey City, New Jersey, United States
- Education: Pratt Institute (BFA)
- Occupation(s): Clothing designer, visual artist, educator
- Known for: Coat and jacket design, textile art, printmaking, painting
- Movement: Artwear
- Spouse(s): Arthur Decker (m. 1969–1974; div.), Barry Lee Shapiro (m. 1981–2009; his death)
- Children: 2
- Website: www.janetlipkin.com

Janet Lipkin (born July 24, 1948) is an American clothing designer, visual artist and educator. She is known for her crocheted and mixed media apparel and is a leading figure in the Artwear movement from the 1970s and 1980s. Lipkin also works in textile art, painting, and printmaking. She lives in the San Francisco Bay Area in Richmond, California.

== Early life, family, and education ==
Janet Iva Lipkin was born on July 24, 1948, in Jersey City, New Jersey, to parents Ruth (née Jacobson) and Milton Lipkin. She graduated with a BFA degree in 1970 from Pratt Institute in Brooklyn. One of Lipkin's classmates at Pratt Institute was Jean Cacicedo. Additionally she took classes at Penland School of Craft in Penland, North Carolina.

Lipkin was married to Arthur Decker from 1969 until 1974, ending in divorce. She remarried in 1981 to photographer Barry Lee Shapiro, together they had two children. Shaprio died from cancer in 2009.

== Career ==
In her early career she is known for her crocheted clothing, specifically coats and jackets. She later used in her clothing design work the knitting machine, beading, hand knitting, and ikat dyeing. Her apparel work combine textures, colors, and materials. Lipkin also started painting and printmaking in her later career. She is considered a leading figure within the Artwear movement.

She worked for many years teaching art classes at the private Jewish day school Tehiyah Day School in El Cerrito, California, before its closure in 2018. She also taught at the University of California, Santa Cruz Extension Program in the 1970s.

Her artwork is in museum collections, including at the Metropolitan Museum of Art in New York City; the Museum of Arts and Design in New York City; the Philadelphia Museum of Art; the Museum of Fine Arts, Boston; and the Los Angeles County Museum of Art.
