= Susanna Lewis =

American textile artist (1938–2021)

Susanna E. Lewis
- Born: 1938
- Died: July 15, 2021 (aged 82–83); Monroe, New York
- Occupation: Fiber Artist
- Years active: 1970s–1980s
- Movement: Art to Wear

Susanna E. Lewis (1938 – July 15, 2021) was an American fiber artist, teacher and author known for her contributions to the Art to Wear movement.

== Biography and Work ==
The daughter of an Army Air Forces officer, Lewis received a BA from University of Michigan and an MA from the Teachers College of Columbia University. She later attended the Pratt Institute.

Lewis was active in Art to Wear movement in the 1970s and 1980s. Inspired by Mary Walker Phillips she bought a knitting machine (the Passap Duomatic 5) in 1971 and taught herself, beginning to create hangings and garments in the late 1970s. She is known for her highly decorated textile wearable pieces, a direction she was encouraged to take by Julie Schafler Dale, her gallerist. For instance, the Moth Cape represented a nightmare, "wherein a feeling of death enveloped her like the wings of a giant moth". The weight and shape of the piece meant the wearer could share that experience.

Lewis was also an author of knitting books, and contributor to knitting magazines, including A Machine Knitter’s Guide To Creating Fabrics (with Julia Weissman), considered foundational to the craft, and Knitting lace. She taught at Parsons School of Design about machine knitting in the 1980s.

== Collections and exhibitions ==
Lewis' work can be found in the collections of:

- The Philadelphia Museum of Art
- The Metropolitan Museum of Art
- The Brooklyn Museum
