= Damselfrau =

Norwegian artist, mask maker (born 1978)

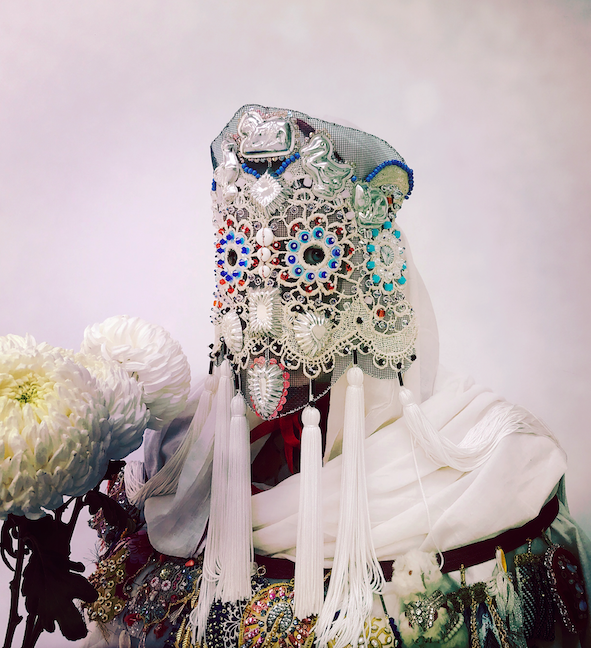
«Self portrait». The artist wearing one of her masks

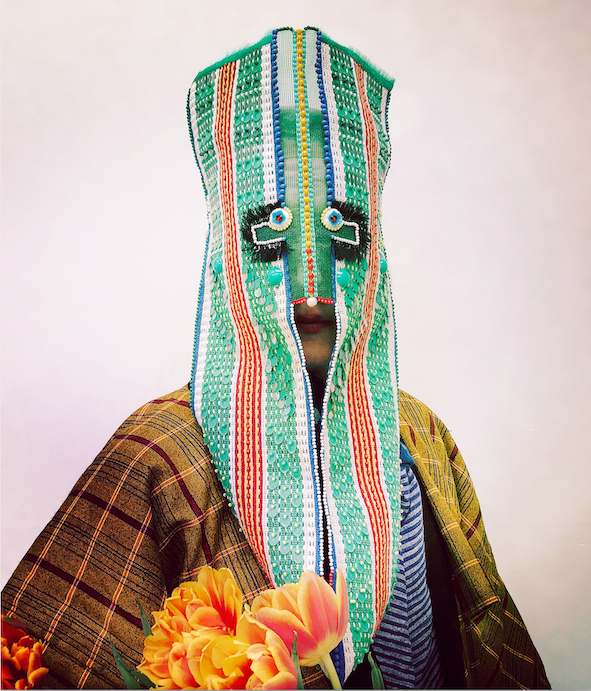
The Damselfrau mask «Virpir»

Magnhild Kennedy (born 1978 in Trondheim, Norway), better known professionally as Damselfrau, is a London-based Norwegian artist. She creates wearable art, mostly masks and jewellery. Her masks are presented on her own Instagram account and on several other websites; in magazines and exhibitions – and they are used by internationally known singers and other artists in their videos or on stage, as parts of their own projects.

== Background and education ==
Kennedy grew up in Trondheim. Both her parents are artists. Her mother, Heidi Kennedy Skjerve, makes experimental textile art, while her father, Stein Rønning, is a sculptor.

Kennedy herself is self-taught as an artist. According to herself, she has never studied anything relevant to design or to mask making. She considers growing up in a home where both parents were artists, her schooling. She has no formal training in crafts or textile work, those skills she has developed over the years, learning through looking at clothes and crafts, trial and error, and watching YouTube tutorials.

== Career ==
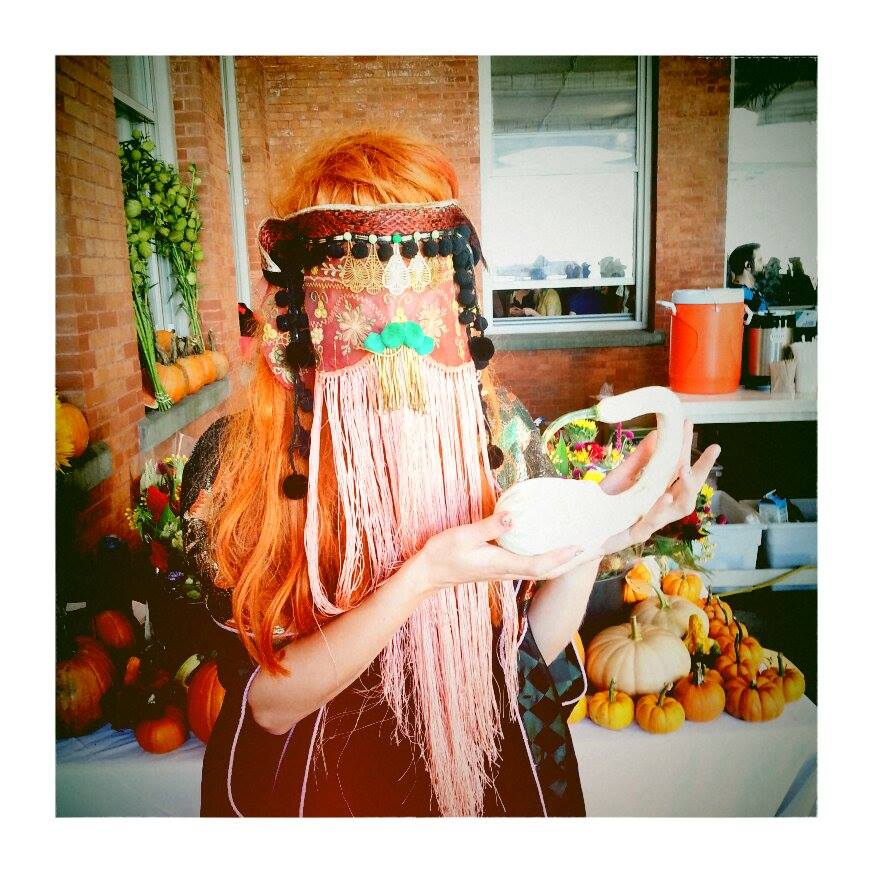
The Norwegian artist Lisa C.B. Lie in her own play Skogsunderholdning, wearing a Damselfrau mask

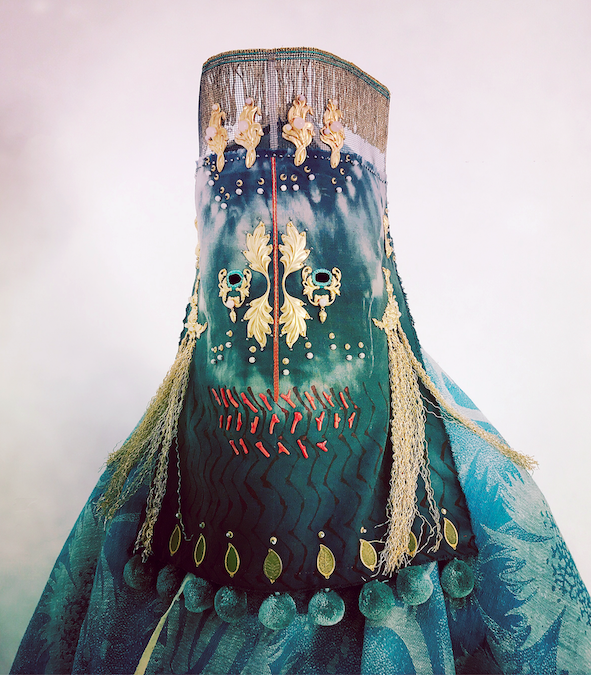
Self portrait with mask

When she and her husband Robert Kennedy moved to London in 2007, she made masks only for herself and her husband, as parts of outfits to be used in parties, but from 2009 on she works as a professional mask maker under the name Damselfrau. Damselfrau consists of the English word «Damsel» (unmarried woman) and the German word «Frau» (woman). Kennedy interprets this inherently paradoxical pseudonym as «married to oneself». A journalist called it «a fitting mantle for an artist who has become renowned for her masks; a craft that involves placing another ‘self’ on top of your own, creating both a combination of the two and suggesting something entirely new altogether».

Kennedy's first commission was for the Norwegian singer Anneli Drecker and the band Røyksopp for one of their tours. Since then she has made masks for artists like MØ, Beyoncé and Daphne Guinness, and collaborated with Louis Vuitton.

=== Materials, inspiration, technique ===
All Damselfrau masks are made, mostly sewn, by hand. Kennedy uses all kinds of materials she can find, literary. The materials range from pearls, old tea towels and gold confetti to plastic trinkets and old laces. She never sketches or decides the design of a mask on beforehand. The materials she combines decide the design and expression of each mask, which she sculpts on mannequin heads. The process sometimes takes a day or a week. At other times the mannequin head sits on a shelf wearing a half finished mask for a year, until the right material «surfaces» in her studio.

Kennedy's masks transgress the borders between art, fashion and costume design. She is not particularly interested in masks as a category. What interests her, is to work with all sorts of materials, preferably materials with a history, and organize them in a small area, «so that in the end, they communicate something. I’m really more interested in decorating a space than a body or a face».

== Exhibitions and presentations ==
While Instagram has been the main platform for presenting her art, her masks are also shown on art and fashion websites and magazines, like Vanity Fair, Another Man and Vogue. The masks are also frequently shown in solo and group exhibitions.

=== Selected solo exhibitions ===
- 2011 – Damselfrau, Doors Showcase, London.
- 2015 – Damselfrau ll, Idios. Dalston Pier, London.
- 2017 – Damselfrau lll, Dalston Pier, London.
- 2018 – Damselfrau, Rake Visningsrom, Trondheim, Norge.
- 2019 – Damselfrau, National Museum of Decorative Arts and Design, Trondheim.

=== Selected group exhibitions ===
- 2013 – MoBA 13, Mode Biennale Arnhem, Holland.
- 2018 – Deviations, Musee Bargoin, Clermont-Ferran, Frankrike.
- 2019 – International Festival of extraordinary textiles, Musee Brasov, Brasov, Romania.
- 2020 – Adornment, Albert van Abbehuis, Eindhoven, Holland.

== Memberships and honours ==
Kennedy is a member of the Norwegian Association for Arts and Crafts.

In 2019 Damselfrau was included, by Vogue, in their VogueWorld 100 pushing boundaries list, as one of the «100 fearless, talented individuals who have captured our attention of late and are poised to transform style, beauty, and culture globally in the months to come».

In 2019 she was also chosen as one of the «Top 100 wearable art designers on Instagram» by the Beautiful Bizarre Magazine.
