= Mascha Mioni =

Swiss textile artist

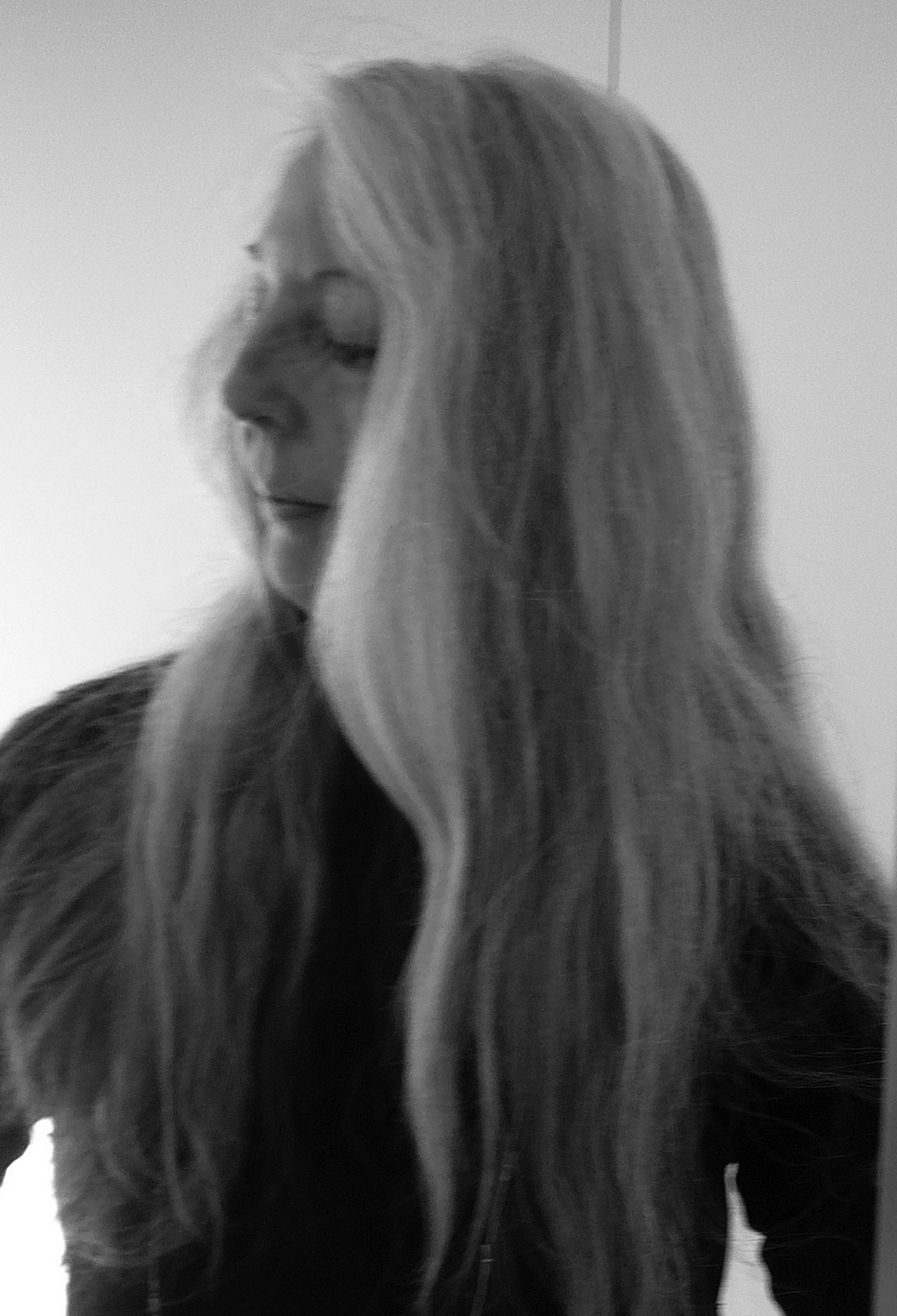
- Born: Marianne Bissig; 17 April 1941; Zurich, Switzerland
- Other names: Marianne Mittelholzer
- Known for: textile art, installation art, painting
- Notable work: Rooibos Teabag Dress, Installation "Lismete"
- Website: www.maschamioni.ch/en

Marianne Mittelholzer, artist name Mascha Mioni (born 17 April 1941 in Zurich) is a Swiss painter and textile artist. Her best known creations are in the area of art to wear, the design of garments as an object of art, and wearable art.

== Life ==
Mascha Mioni was born Marianne Bissig and is the daughter of a taylor/dressmaker and a railroad electrician. She grew up in Brugg and Rapperswil SG Switzerland. Following her mother she became a dressmaker. After her apprenticeship she lived as an Au Pair-girl in Paris, France and Exeter, England. Then she studied in Florence, Italy. In 1967 she married the ophthalmologist Kurt Mittelholzer, who died 1976. They had two daughters.

Since 1981 she has lived with the mathematician Heiner Graafhuis. In 2001 they built together their atelier-house in Meggen LU, Switzerland, where they live today. Mascha's studio is in the house and from time to time she curates exhibitions there.

== Work ==
Mascha Mioni has used many different techniques and materials in her artwork. The book Kunstkleiderkunst, by Julie Schafler Dale, inspired her to become a co-founder of the Swiss Art to Wear Team. She became a pioneer of this artform for Europe. On the significance of a dress as an art-form she comments as follows:

To create art to wear you take a picture from the wall, to cover your body with it. This changes the approach and the meaning of the art-work. The focus switches from an isolated object, that represents "art", to a piece of art, that can also be used as a dress.

Through her experiments with the dyeing of silk she contributed significantly to repositioning the Shibori-technique in the artistic field.

Her interest in worldwide current affairs inspired her to make work like Green Piece / Green Peace which spread its wings at UNESCO in Paris or the minacious dark golf dress, which she conceived at the beginning of the Gulf War.

In 2012/13, using Texaid plastic bags, distributed in Switzerland to all households to collect used textiles, she knitted the 18x9x10ft large installation "Lismete" (Swiss-German for "knit-work"), It warns future generations of the plastic waste covering the world.

== Exhibitions ==
1977–1988 Between 1977 and 1988 she showed her oil painting on canvas at group and solo exhibitions, until her textile art found greater recognition in a group-exhibition at the Landhaus Solothurn, Switzerland.

1991 In 1991 she had a solo exhibition at the Textile Museum in St. Gallen, Switzerland. This led to a group exhibition in Auburn/NY, United States and in Cologne, Germany.

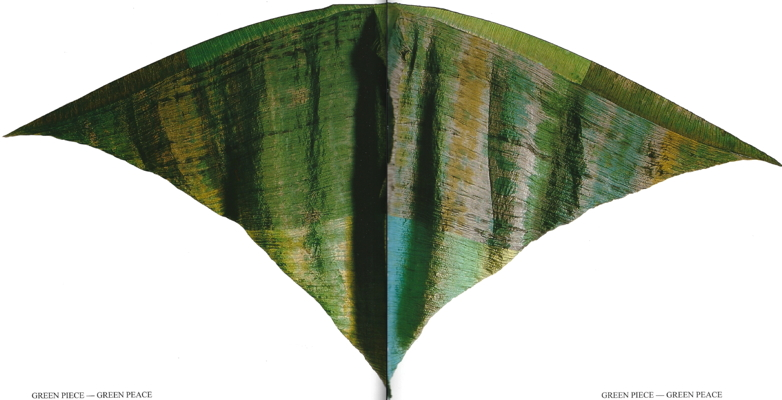
Green Peace: Parachute-silk colored with Dupont-colors, folded, 1994, 12ft6in x 5ft3in, photo: Asy Asendorf, Zurich

1995 After a small solo exhibition at the World Economic Forum in Davos, Switzerland and a group exhibition at the House of Art (Dom Umenia) in Bratislava, Slowakia, and again at the Textile Museum St. Gallen, she published, in 1995, the first book about her Art to Wear with her own publishing company greina Verlag. This was followed every five years by a new book.

1998– Her long-standing friendship with the US-American sculptor Lawrence McLaughlin led to joint expositions of his sculptures and her oil paintings beginning in 1998 at the Gallery In der Loft, Dietlikon/Zurich. They had additional joint exhibitions in 2007, at the Gallery of the city of Beaugency, France, and in 2012 at the Bareiss Gallery in Taos, New Mexico, USA, and in 2014 at the Zoepfli Gallery in Lucerne, Switzerland.

2002 Several group exhibitions in Tiflis, Georgia, at the UNESCO in Paris, France and in Italy made clear to her, that Wearable Art was best shown worn on the body in a performance. In 2002 she showed her first performance at Fashionation, Musée Suisse, Zurich, Switzerland. Performances at the 4th International Shibori Symposium in Harrogate, England, and in Melbourne, Australia, as well as a group exhibition at the Tama Art University Museum, Tokyo, Japan, and again at the Textile Museum St. Gallen, followed. Some of her art to wear is also set in scenes all over Europe by the dancers of the Compagnie Irene K.

2008 After a solo exhibition at the Museum Sursilvan, Trun/GR, Switzerland, followed a room-installation at a group exhibition at the Aarberghaus, Ligerz, Switzerland, and a performance at the 7th International Shibori Symposium at the Musée du Quai Branly, Paris in the year 2008.

2010 Besides the continuing work in oil on canvas and with mixed media, the curating of exhibitions for international artist friends like Shinzo Kajiwara, Tokyo, and Werner Bitzigeio, Winterspelt, Germany, she also created an installation on the Art Path along the young Rhine in Trun, Switzerland.

2013 She was part of a group exhibition together with Yoshiko Iwamoto Wada, Ana Lisa Hedstrom, Junichi Arai and other internationally acclaimed artists at the Hong Kong Polytechnical University, China, and from August 2013 until February 2014 at the Jim Thompson Art Center, Bangkok.

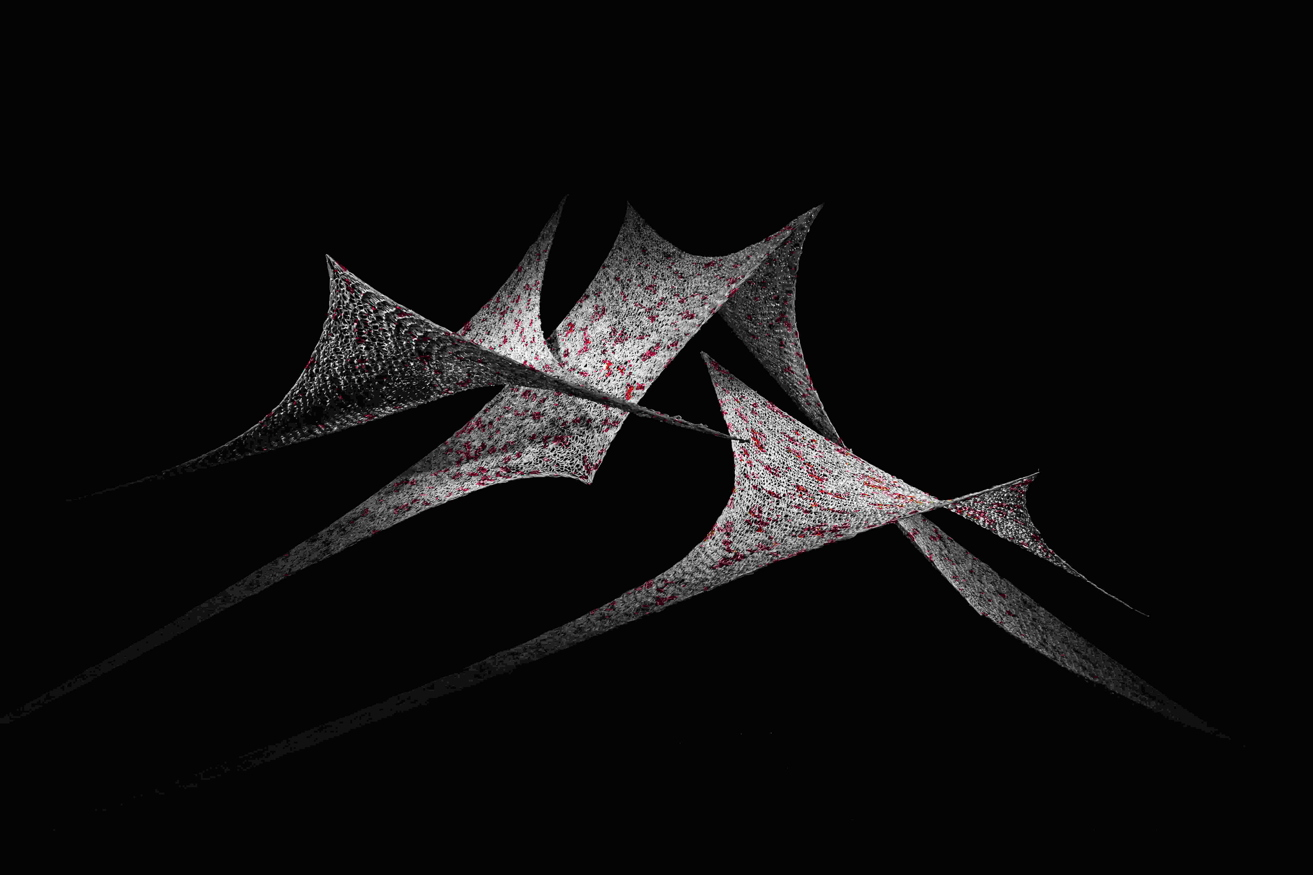
Lismete: red and white Texaid plastic bags, cut, knitted, stretched, 20x10x10ft, installation at studio, photo: Carlos Rieder, Luzern

2014 Her major projects In 2014 were two large installations "Lismete" (30x15x10ft) and "Dance of Life" at the China National Silk Museum, Hangzhou, while being Artist in Residence at the Jin Ze Art Center, in Shanghai during October and November.

== Publications ==
- Mioni, Mascha (1995). Art to Wear 1. Greina Verlag. ISBN 3-9520943-0-7.
- Mioni, Mascha (2001). Art to Wear 2. Greina Verlag. ISBN 3-9520943-3-1.
- Mioni, Mascha (2005). Art to Wear 3. Greina Verlag. ISBN 3-9520943-5-8.
- Mioni, Mascha; Rieder, Carlos (2011). Art to Wear 4: vor der Kamera von Carlos Rieder – Textil Art Mascha Mioni. Greina Verlag. ISBN 3-9520943-7-4.
- Mioni, Mascha; Rieder, Carlos (2017). Art to Wear 5: Augenblick Mal – Kunstschmuck von Mascha Mioni, fotografiert von Carlos Rieder. Greina Verlag. ISBN 3-9520943-8-2
