= Festival of Transitional Architecture =

Festival in New Zealand

- Status: Defunct
- Locations: Christchurch, New Zealand
- Most recent: 2018
- Website: festa.org.nz

The Festival of Transitional Architecture, or FESTA for short, occurred in Christchurch, New Zealand. It involved temporary architectural installations and events such as workshops, walks and talks. The festival was annual from 2012 to 2014 inclusive and was biennial (occurred every two years) from then until 2018, when it took place for the final time. Each of the festivals were produced and directed by Jessica Halliday.

== History ==
The festivals included carnivals featuring temporary architectural installations made by New Zealand and Australian architectural students. The installations are examples of "transitional architecture", temporary projects made to transition the city from pre-to-post 2010 and 2011 Canterbury earthquakes, using spaces that had become vacant after earthquake-damaged buildings were demolished. The festival also included several smaller events including workshops, walks and talks. Each of the festivals from 2012 to 2018 were produced and directed by the architectural historian Jessica Halliday. Festa was succeeded by the charity Te Pūtahi – Christchurch Centre for Architecture and City-making, which creates city architectural events. In 2019 the organisation ran 11 events in 11 weeks, called Open Christchurch.

== 2012 ==
The 2012 festival lasted for 10 days and had 16 temporary structures involving light, making up what was called LuxCity. Components of these included projectors, lasers, balloons and demolition cranes with fabric hanging from them. Events included a tour of the replacement of Lancaster Park, lectures and workshops. Between 20 and 30 thousand people attended. According to Stuff, the event "was viewed as the most successful creative public event of the year" in Christchurch.

== 2013 ==
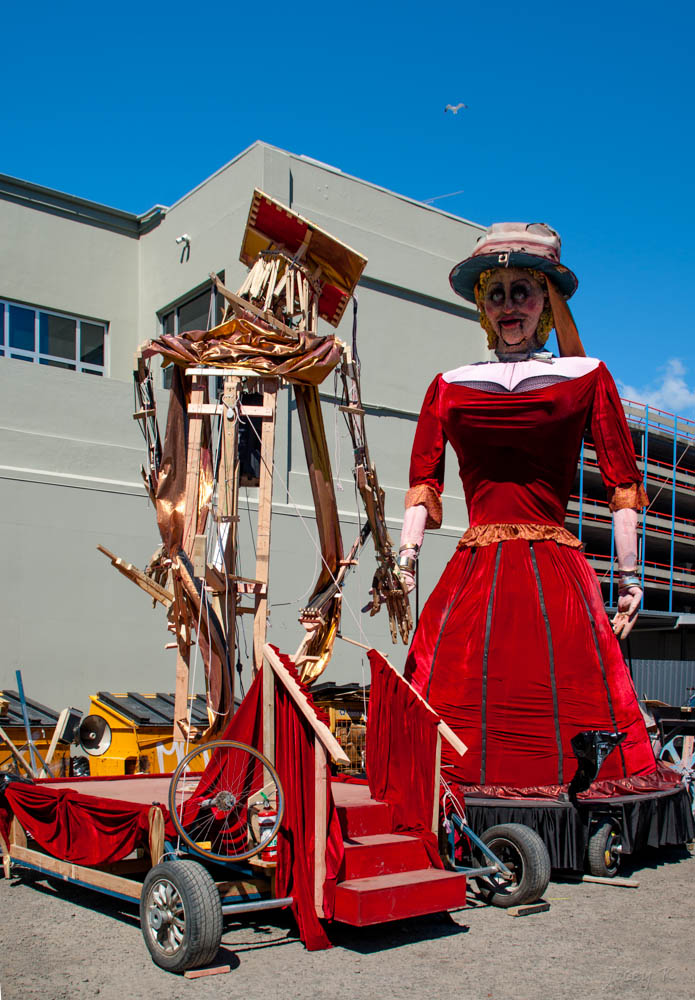
Puppets used for the Canterbury Tales event

The 2013 festival included a Canterbury Tales parade in view of under 2,000 spectators who could walk on the streets that the parade was happening on. It included five large puppets, including a six-metre-tall Wife of Bath and a five-metre-tall Scholar, as well as six smaller friar puppets. The parade happened on two separate nights and went from the Bridge of Remembrance to Cathedral Square. The festival included several other smaller elements, such as Picture House, a trailer-mounted cinema that could fit two people. It travelled to sites that had picture theatres before the earthquakes. There was also an communal garden called Agropolis in the former Poplar Lane that started with seven planter boxes and composted green waste from two nearby restaurants. On empty land at 136 Manchester Street there was a pop-up sauna.

== 2014 ==
External image
- Road cone installation
- https://www.canterburystories.nz/collections/photohunt/2019/ccl-cs-14109

The 2014 festival's flagship event was called CityUps, a "street party" on High Street which had installations designed by over 250 university and polytechnic students. The festival had 14 major installations, including:

- Orbis, which had water balloons that rarely broke hanging off a ceiling using cloth sleeves. People would swing the balloons around.
- Equilibrium, a large cube made of waving white cloth. It was a night club for dancing and had projectors projecting images onto the cloth and had music playing.
- Another installation, created by students of the University of Auckland, was called AntiGravity and a ball made of traffic cones arranged into a sphere and several other cones on walls in a wavy pattern. It also had flashing lights, rock and roll music and fake smoke.

A goal was that the materials used in the installations would be recycled after they were finished being used for the festival. An event at Cathedral Junction was called Jelloucity where people would sculpt cities out of jelly. At The Arcades the organisation Gap Filler had the Light Up Your Life parade of glowing wearable art, which people could make at a public maker space. Other small events included the use of Gap Filler's Dance-O-Mat. There was no Festa in 2015; the event became biennial.

== 2016 ==
The 2016 Festa had a "We Have the Means" theme, where the materials used in the installations were made from materials that were originally intended on being disposed of. The flagship event for this year was Lean Means, which had artistic installations in sites that had been vacant since the earthquakes. There were 18 of these installations, designed by students from seven New Zealand and Australian universities. The festival lasted for four days and included over 30 smaller events which included Zero Waste Village of Resourcefulness where people in tempoary shelters made zero-waste crafts. Other events included walking tours and talks, and there was a food market at Cathedral Square and Gap Filler's Dance-O-Mat was a part of the festival. Superuse Studio made a children's playground using old wind turbines. The 2016 festival included work by the artist Julia Morison.

== 2018 ==
The 2018 festival ran from 19 to 22 October. The theme was the intersection of food and temporary architectural installations, leading to the name of the signature event being FEASTA. Over 130 architecture and design students created the installations; this was the first year that professional architects worked with the students on the designs. There were over 50 events. The festival started with a children's parade with wearable art made from food packaging. There was an Asian food market, a giant coffee pot and a "bar of the future". There was also a workshop on growing food and another teaching how to reduce waste and financial cost with respect to food. The festival ended with the playing of the film SEED: The Untold Story, about food production. For small children, the film WALL-E was played.
