= Jean Cacicedo =

American clothing designer, textile artist (b. 1948)

Jean Williams Cacicedo
- Born: 1948 (age 77–78); Orange, New Jersey, United States
- Education: Pratt Institute (BFA)
- Occupations: Visual artist, clothing designer, educator
- Known for: Coat design, appliqués, fiber art, collage, papermaking
- Movement: Art to wear
- Website: jeancacicedo.com

Jean Williams Cacicedo (born 1948) is an American clothing designer, visual artist and educator. She is known for her crocheted and mixed media coats, and is a notable figure in the art to wear movement in the 1970s and 1980s. Cacicedo is also recognized in the fiber arts community for her decorative wall pieces that are crafted from wool, linen, and other fibers, and she also works in collage, and paper making. Cacicedo lives in Berkeley, California.

== Biography ==
Jean Williams Cacicedo was born in 1948, in Orange, New Jersey. She received a B.F.A. degree in 1970 from Pratt Institute. One of her classmates at Pratt Institute was Janet Lipkin.

Cacicedo has been involved in the art to wear movement since college. She is known for her crocheted and mixed media coats, with designs inspired by myths, symbolic imagery, and spiritual journeys. She teaches out of her studio, and has been a visiting artist at California College of Arts, Penland School of Craft, and Split Rock Arts Program at the University of Minnesota.

Cacicedo's work is held by the de Young Museum in San Francisco; the Oakland Museum of California; the Museum of Fine Arts, Boston; the Philadelphia Museum of Art; and the Museum of Arts and Design in New York City.
