= Julie Schafler Dale =

American curator and gallerist

Julie Schafler Dale is a gallerist, curator and craft historian known for supporting the American Art to Wear or art-as-fashion movement.

== Biography ==
Schafler founded Julie: Artisans' Gallery on Madison Avenue in New York City in 1973, in response to the growing interest in the use of fiber techniques, and more generally for crafts, in the American art world and art education. She encouraged and supported fiber artists based in New York, such as Susanna Lewis, Jo-Ellen Trilling or Diana Prekup. She encouraged fiber artists, who often focused on hangings, to explore the potential of worn textile shapes and their movements.

Schafler wrote and published Art to Wear, a book foundational to the movement and to its influence abroad, for instance on artist Mascha Mioni. She closed her gallery in 2013.

Schafler married actor Jim Dale in 1981.
