= Gap Filler =

New Zealand non-profit

- Formation: 2010; 16 years ago
- Dissolved: 2026
- Headquarters: Christchurch, New Zealand
- Website: gapfiller.org.nz

Gap Filler was a New Zealand non-profit organisation founded in Christchurch, New Zealand, after the September 2010 and February 2011 earthquakes which hit the city. The organisation was co-founded by artist Coralie Winn and University of Canterbury lecturer Ryan Reynolds to create temporary public spaces in places that became vacant as a result of the earthquakes. The group operated for 15 years, in which time they created a series of temporary installations and held events across the central city, including a small events venue constructed out of recycled wooden pallets and a coin-operated dance floor. In April 2023, Gap Filler announced that they would reduce their staff to one employee, and in 2026 they announced that operations as a whole would end.

== City Putt and Cruise ==
A mini golf course was opened in 2017 using parts of earthquake-damaged heritage buildings. It also included part of the old Medway Street footbridge, which crossed the Avon River / Ōtākaro. The mini golf course was closed in 2023 to free up space for new homes, and the parts of heritage structures were returned to the Christchurch City Council.

== Dance-O-Mat ==
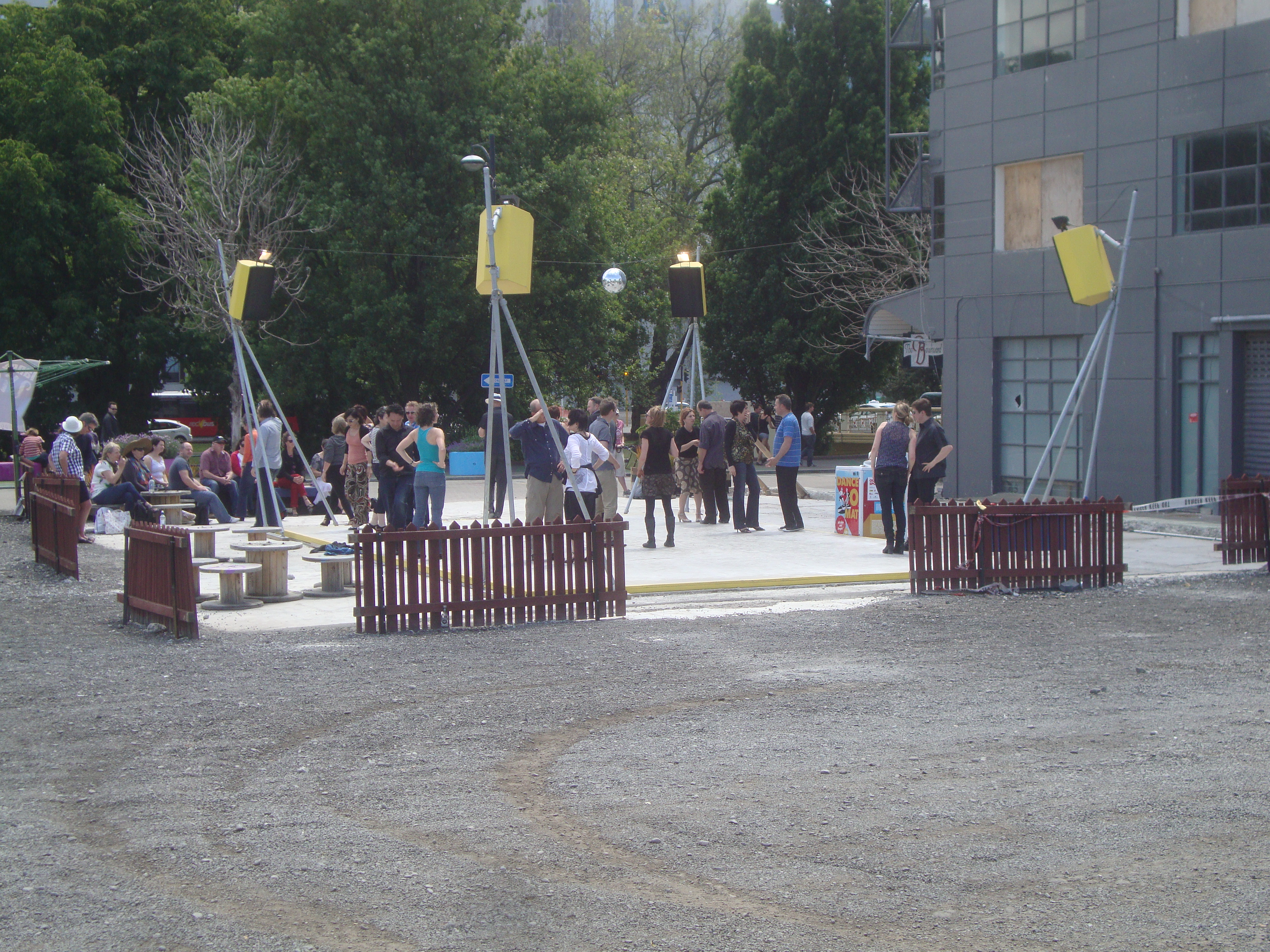
Dance-O-Mat in November 2012

Dance-O-Mat is a coin-operating mat that members of the public dance on. It has speakers, a glitter ball and lights. Music can be chosen by connecting a music player to the audio jack. By inserting $2 into an old washing machine, the mat will turn on for 30 minutes. In 2012 Prince Charles danced on it. From 4 July 2014 to 24 July 2015, people danced on the mat for approximately 934 hours. In 2015 Gap Filler was considering franchising it, and was communicating with two cities in Australia and one in Canada to bring a Dance-O-Mat there. In 2016 people gathered on Dance-O-Mat to hold a vigil for the victims of the Pulse nightclub shooting in Orlando, Florida, United States.

In 2012 the mat was in the corner of Manchester Street and St Asaph Street, and was later moved to Gloucester Street. In 2021 the mat was moved from to another location, to give space for the construction of the new Court Theatre.

== Giant spray cans ==
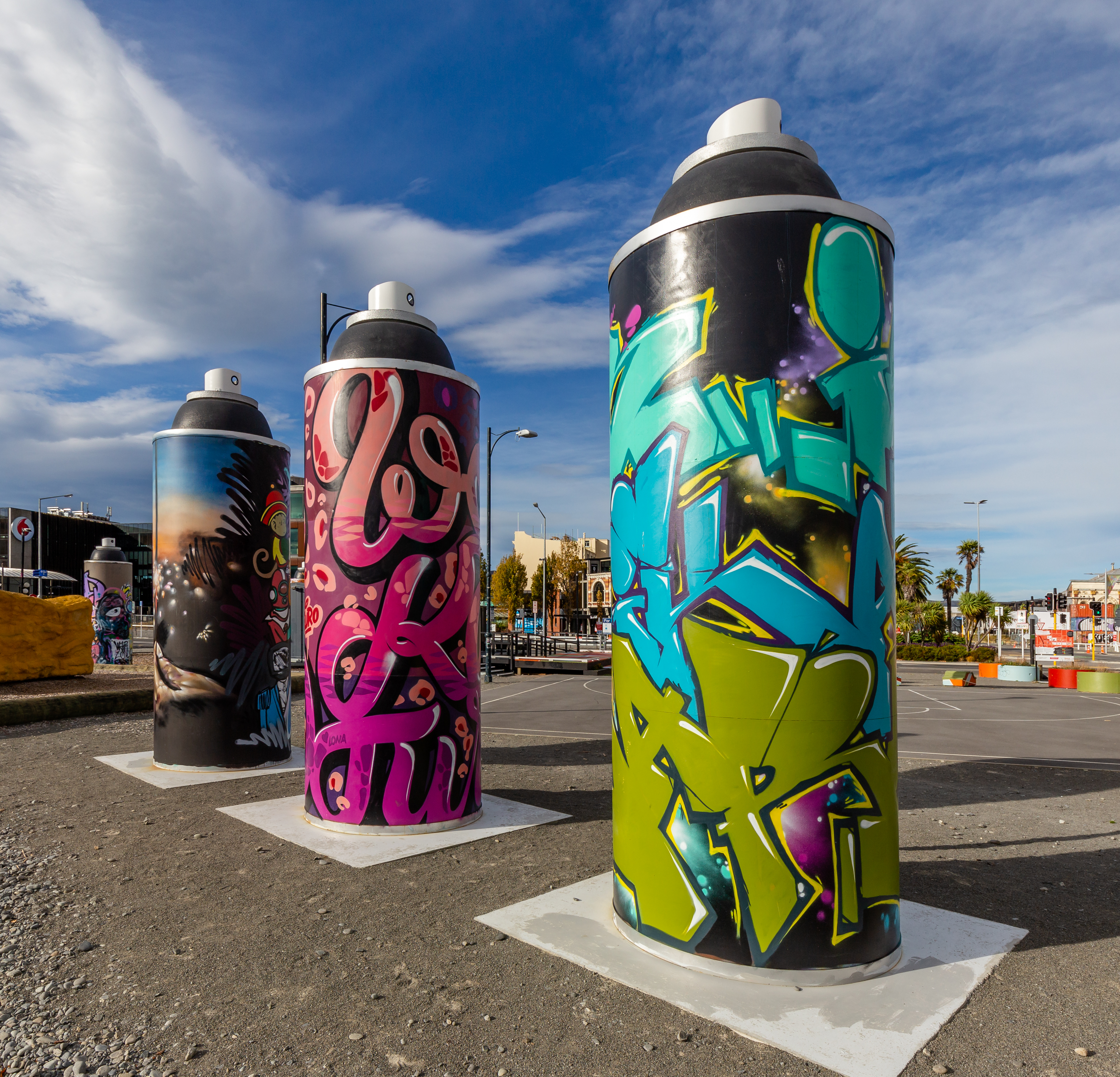
Giant spray cans in 2020

In 2017 Gap Filler, in collaboration with Fletcher Living, placed eight giant spray cans in the corner of Lichfield and Manchester Streets. They were originally made for the Spectrum Street Art Festival and kept after the festival ended. Young street artists were allowed to practise on a few of the cans during graffiti art workshops.

Beside the cans is half a basketball court, also by Gap Filler.

== Good Spot ==
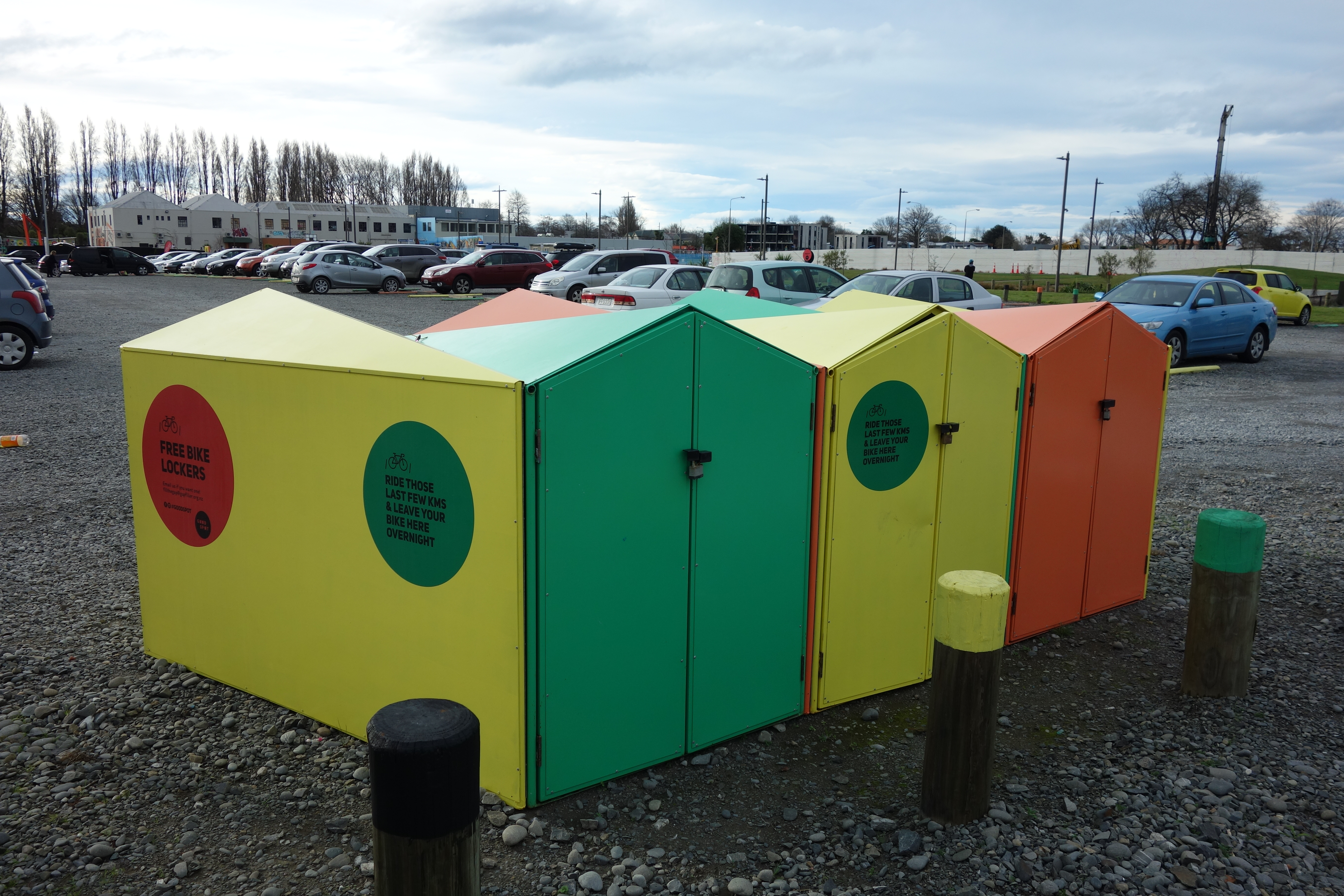
Good Spot bicycle lockers in 2020

Good Spot, a car park with 67 parking spaces, opened in December 2017. Users had to pay to park their cars there, and the proceeds went to the East Frame, where it was located. A point of the project was that its revenue remained in the local community rather than going overseas, as several landowners of sites that had buildings demolished due to the earthquakes would lease their land to international parking companies. In August 2018 another Good Spot car park opened with 130 parking spaces.

== Pallet Pavilion ==
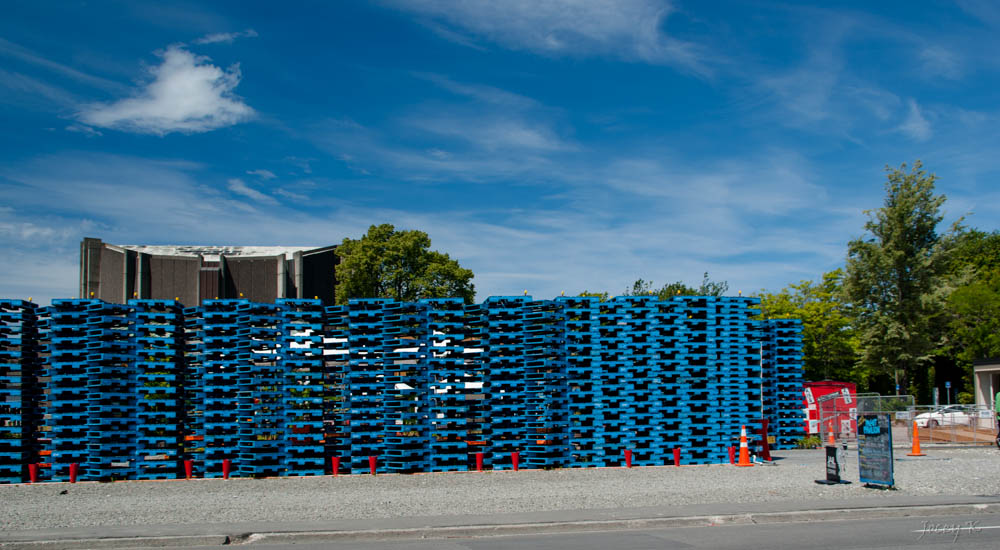
Pallet Pavilion in 2013

After the earthquakes, many venues for performances were closed or demolished.

Pallet Pavilion opened in December 2012 on the corner of Durham and Kilmore Streets after about 250 volunteers had spent 3,000 hours making it out of over 3,000 recycled wooden pallets. It hosted events including concerts, had seating for up to 200 people and had a garden.

By March 2014, the pavilion had hosted over 250 events. In April 2014 the pavilion was removed, a year later than originally planned, as the public donated $80,000 to the project to keep it running, and did so within 30 days. Over 25,000 people visited the pavilion while it existed.

== Super Street Arcade ==
The Super Street Arcade was a giant 1980s-style arcade machine that was placed on Tuam Street in December 2016. It had a big LED screen on the Vodafone (later rebranded One NZ) building, and on the other side of the street was a large joystick over a metre tall as well as two large buttons. The games required two players, where one used the joystick and the other operated the buttons. A tournament was held in May 2017. Eight games were added in September 2017. They were designed by Christchurch high school students and one of them called The Last Kiwi was inspired by the Laser Kiwi flag.

== Think Differently Book Exchange ==
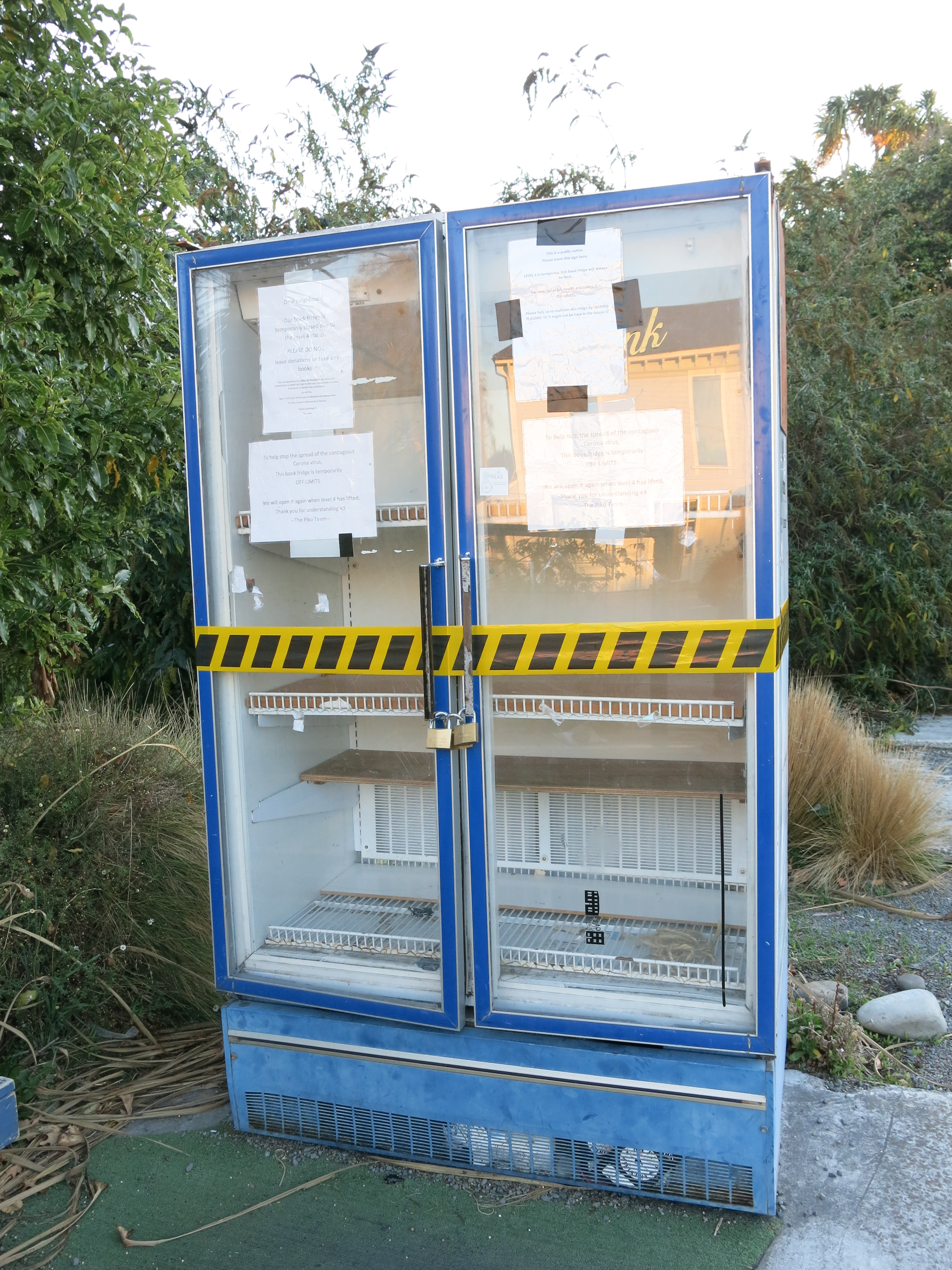
Book fridge in 2020, closed due to the COVID-19 pandemic

The Think Differently Book Exchange is a fridge with glass doors on the corner of Barbadoes and Kilmore Streets. It acts as a book exchange, where the public take books out to read and replace them with other books. The exchange was opened in July 2011.

== Other projects ==
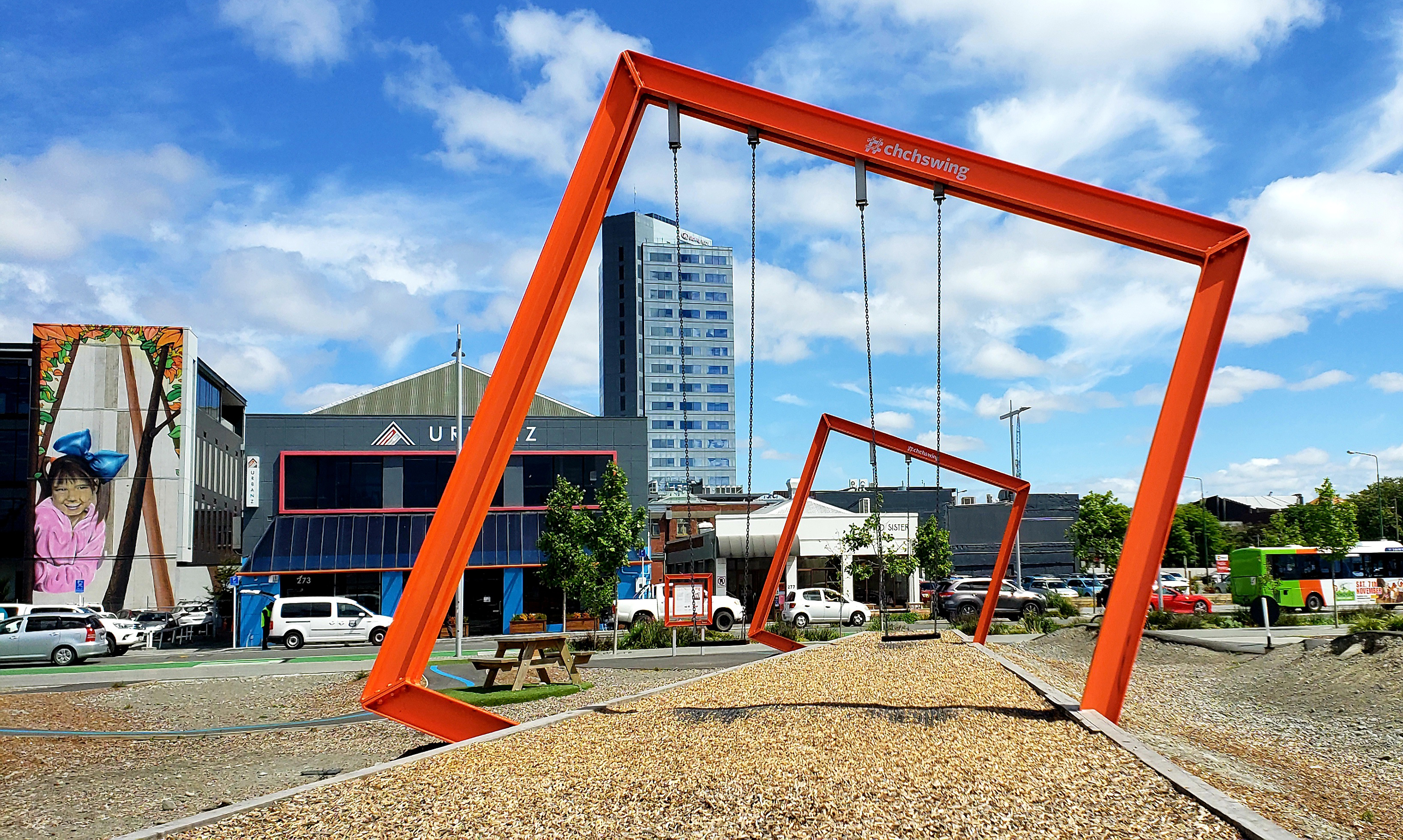
#chchswing in 2020

Other projects included #chchswing, a shed for lending tools, a hammock area, a slackline park, public art made from living willow trees, a bicycle pump track, a cycle-powered cinema and five painted pianos placed on empty land.

== See also ==
- Festival of Transitional Architecture
- Greening the Rubble
