= The Frame (Christchurch) =

Area in Christchurch, New Zealand

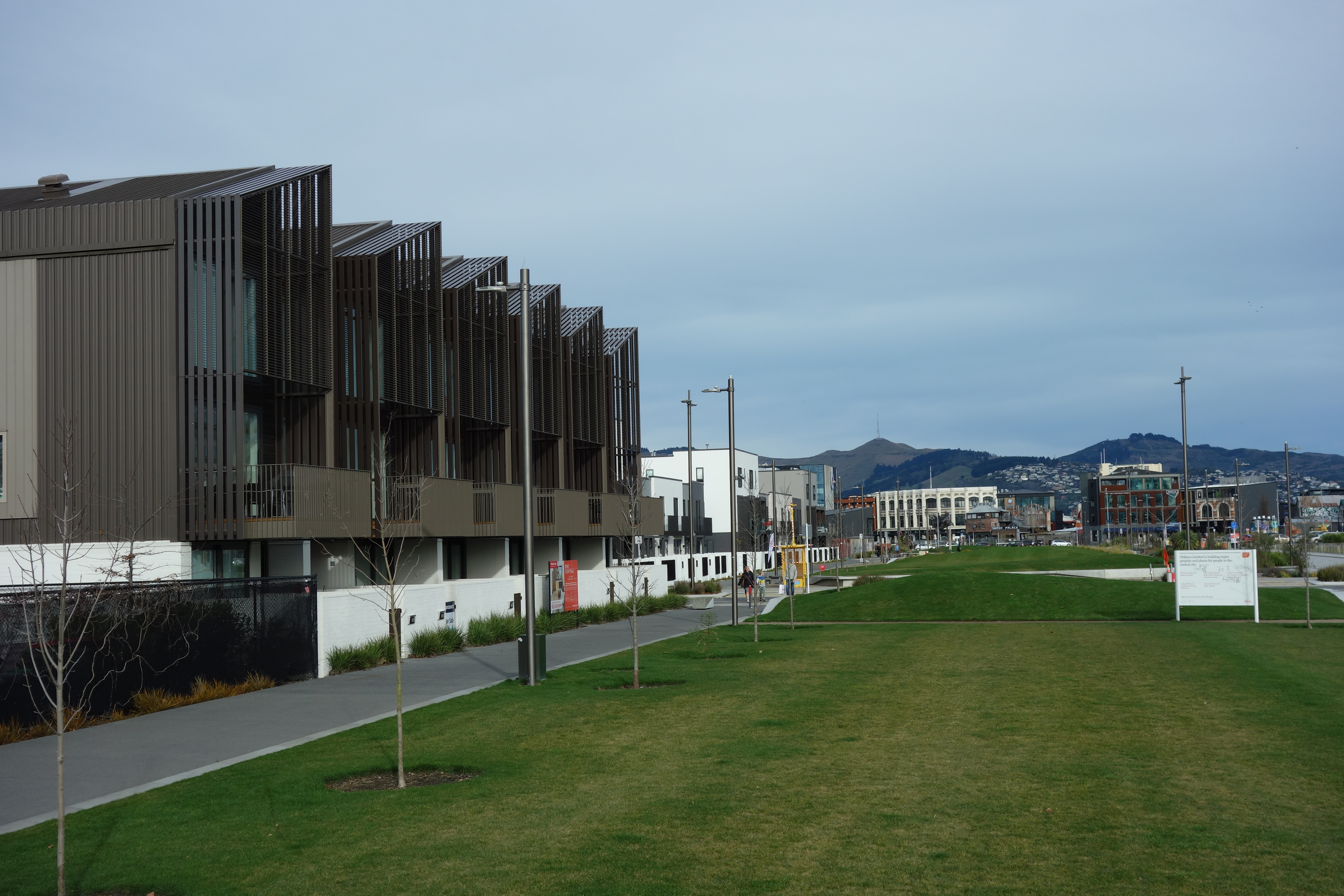
East Frame 460

The Frame is an urban renewal project in Christchurch, New Zealand, with three parts: the East Frame, North Frame and South Frame. The plan for the Frame was published in 2012 in the Christchurch Central Recovery Plan, the plan for recovering the central city after the 2010 and 2011 Canterbury earthquakes. The East Frame is the largest segment, which is being developed into a residential area with Rauora Park down the middle. The South Frame has a walkway, known as the Greenway, running east-west.

== Overview ==
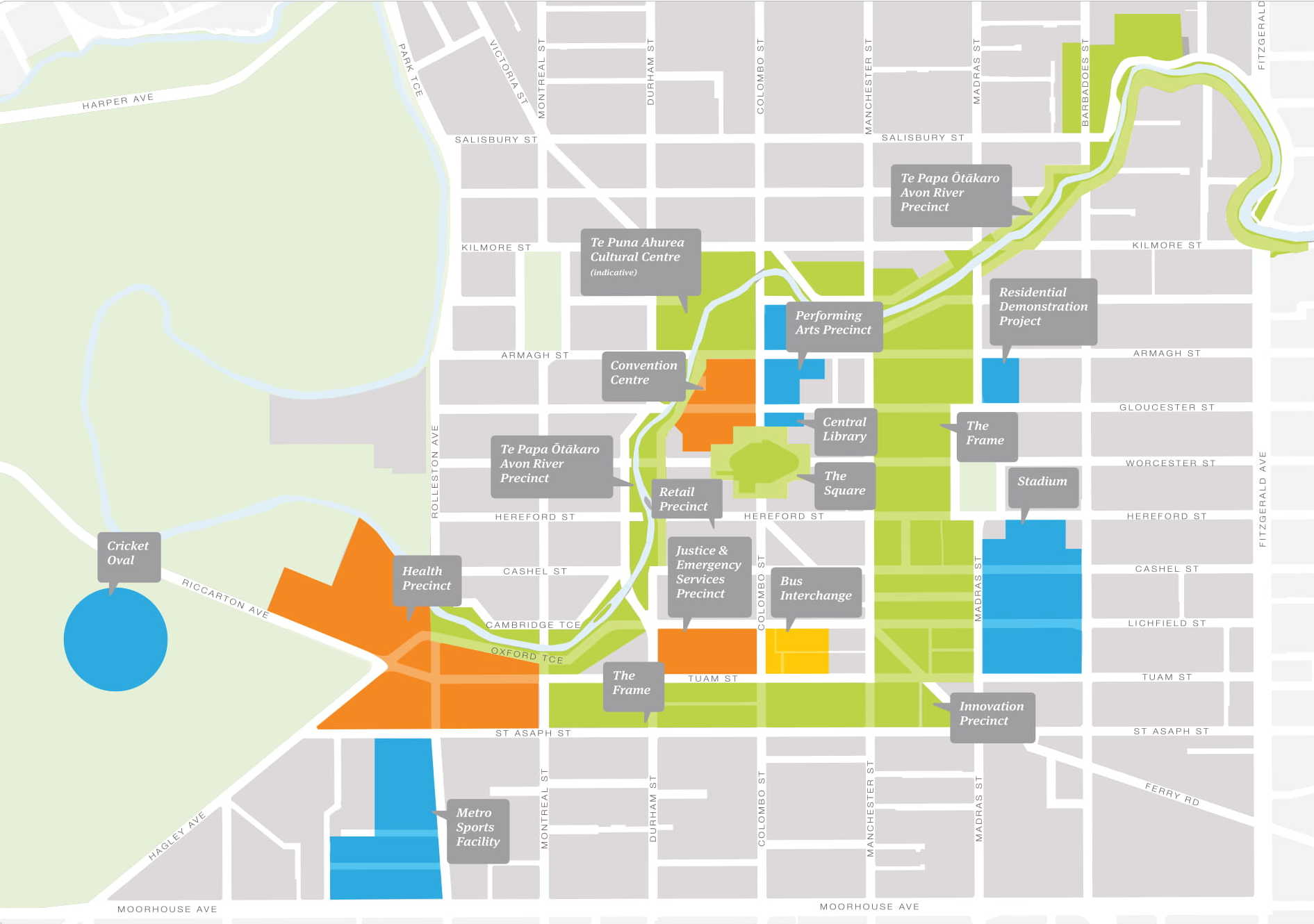
The anchor projects of the recovery plan

The Frame is a part of the Christchurch Central Recovery Plan, published in 2012 to serve as the plan for recovering the central city after the 2010 and 2011 Canterbury earthquakes. The Frame was created to help define a central area known as "the Core", which was to be of a scale appropriate to current demand. The Frame (Māori: Te Tāparepare) was to be in three parts (north, east and south) and was to allow for short to medium term expansion and development of central Christchurch. The development of the Frame was led by the Canterbury Earthquake Recovery Authority.

Part of the Health Precinct is in the south-west corner of the Frame and the Innovation Precinct is on the south-east corner. Both of these precincts are anchor projects of the recovery plan.

== East Frame ==
=== Residential development ===
The East Frame is expected to eventually have 900 homes built for a total of 2,000 residents. Of these 900 homes, Fletcher Living is building 614 homes and Williams Construction 100 homes.

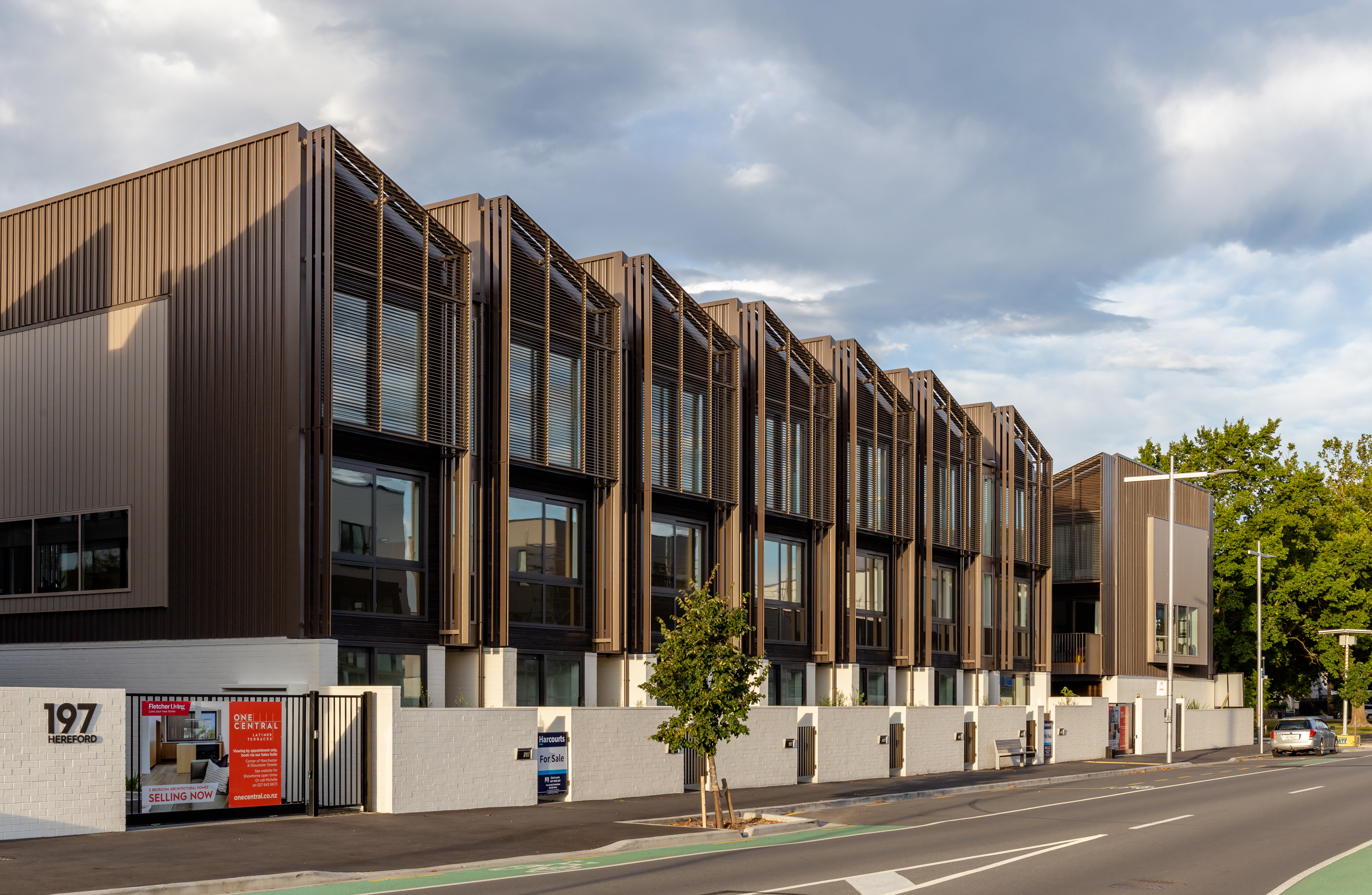
197 Hereford Street

In 2015, the Crown signed a contract with Fletcher Living to build flats and terraced houses in the East Frame. The Crown sold east frame land to Fletcher and Fletcher called their development One Central. The development comprises six city blocks and has Rauora Park in the middle. After many delays, the first residents moved into the development in early 2019. As of May 2025, Fletcher has finished building 350 homes.

=== Rauora Park ===
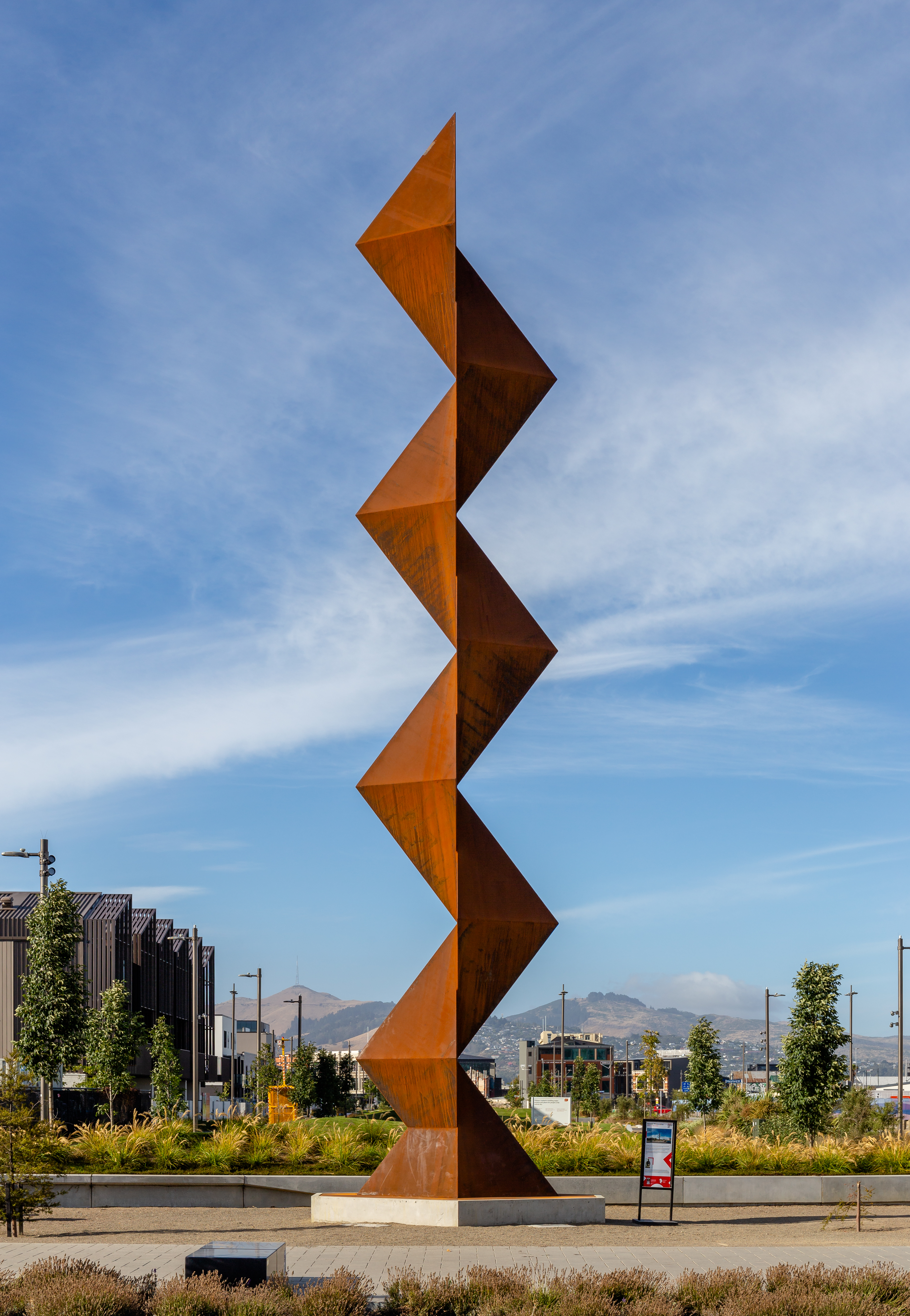
Vaka 'A Hina

Rauora Park opened in December 2017 after $30 million had been spent on it. Comprising six city blocks and going 660 metres (2,170 ft) north-south, the park has 9,000 square metres (97,000 sq ft) of grass and 2,300 square metres (25,000 sq ft) of pavement. Along with gardens and plants, it has a cycleway and walkway and half a basketball court at the northern side.

In 2019, two small pieces of the Berlin Wall were placed in the East Frame. They arrived in the city in 2017 after they had been gifted by a German company that had been deconstructing the wall. They had previously been considered for placement in Victoria Square. The two segments have murals on them.

In September 2019 the 16-metre-tall sculpture Vaka 'A Hina was placed in the park. It was designed by Sēmisi Fetokai Potauaine and commissioned by SCAPE Public Art.

=== Temporary spaces ===
Fletcher Living has spent $1 million on temporary public spaces for the East Frame during its construction. Some of this money went to Gap Filler, a non-profit organisation making temporary public spaces for land that had become vacant due to the Canterbury earthquakes.

In 2017 Gap Filler, in collaboration with Fletcher Living, placed eight giant spray cans in the corner of Lichfield and Manchester Streets. They were originally made for the Spectrum Street Art Festival and kept after the festival ended. Young street artists were allowed to practise on a few of the cans during graffiti art workshops. Beside the cans is half a basketball court, also by Gap Filler.

==== Good Spot ====
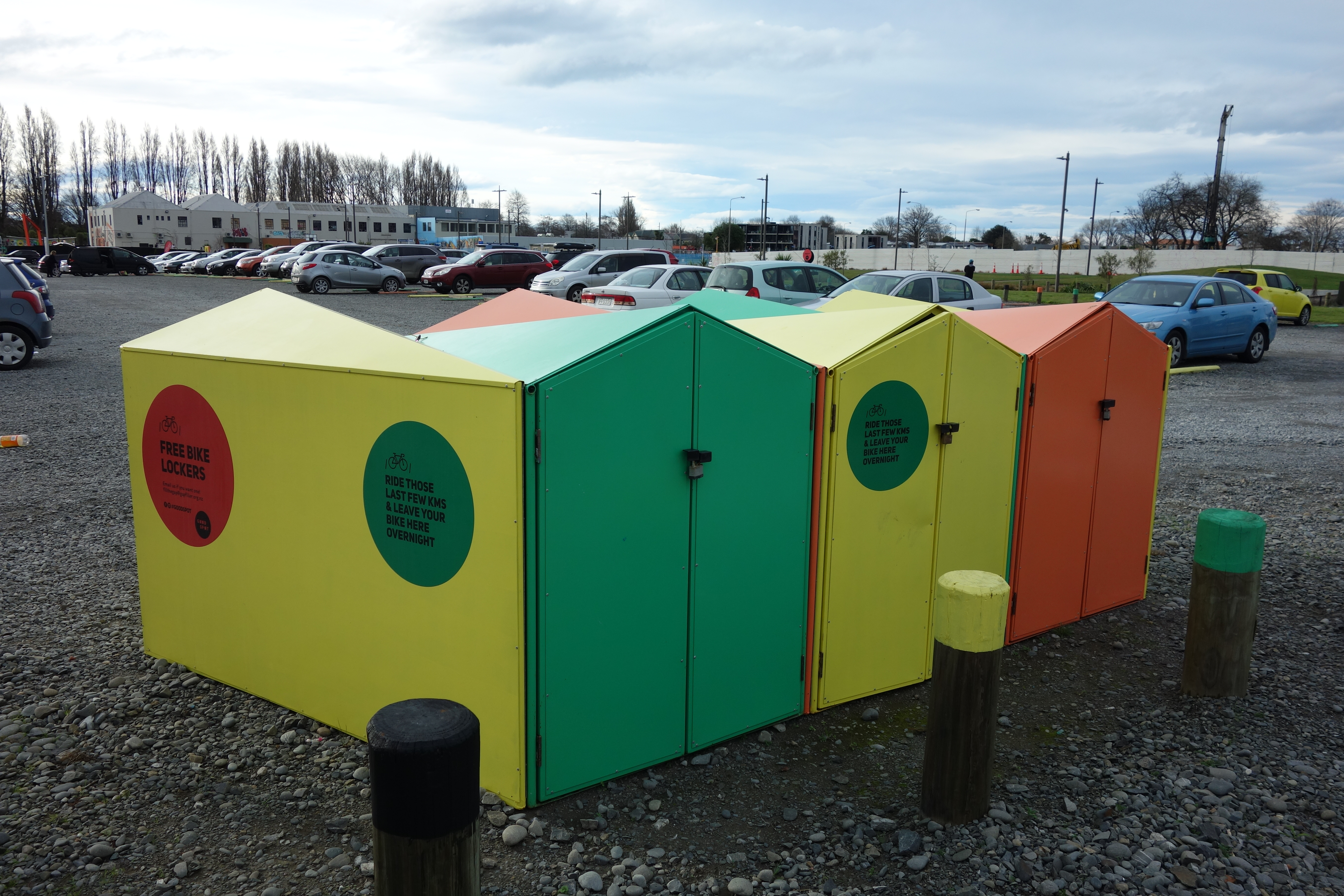
Good Spot bicycle lockers in 2020

Good Spot, a car park with 67 parking spaces, opened in December 2017. Users had to pay to park their cars there, and the proceeds went to the East Frame, where it was located. A point of the project was that its revenue remained in the local community rather than going overseas, as several landowners of sites that had buildings demolished due to the earthquakes would lease their land to international parking companies. In August 2018 another Good Spot car park opened with 130 parking spaces.

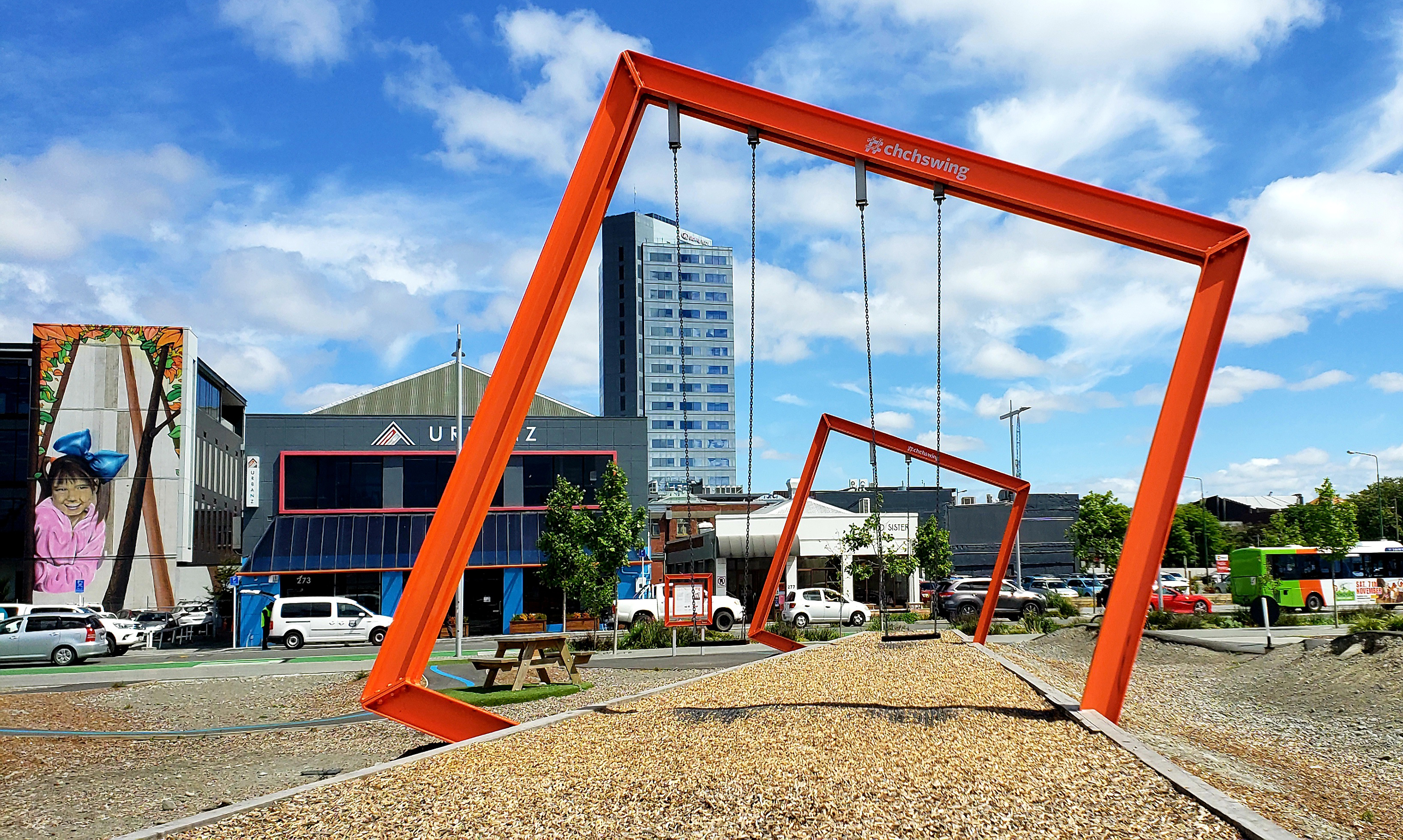
#chchswing is in the East Frame.

=== Margaret Mahy Playground ===
The Margaret Mahy Playground is in the northern edge of the East Frame. It was listed in the Christchurch Central Recovery Plan and was opened in December 2015. Named after the children's author Margaret Mahy, the playground itself cost $3 million, but the costs including land acquisitions and demolitions brought it up to approximately $41 million according to The Press.

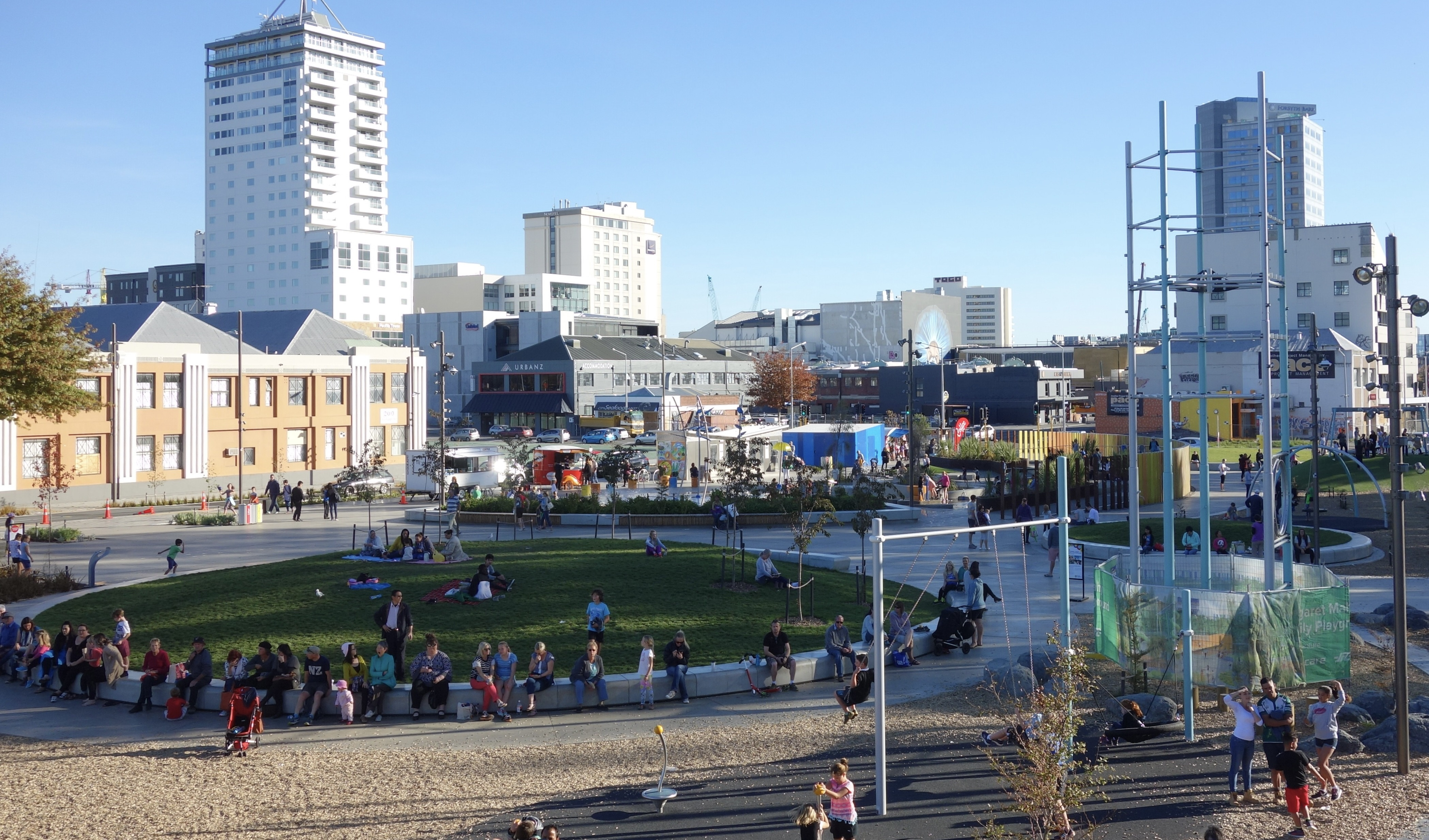
Margaret Mahy Playground in 2016

== North Frame ==
The land of the former PGC Building, which collapsed in the February 2011 earthquake and killed 18 people, is in the North Frame. The land is used as a park.

=== Pedestrian bridge ===
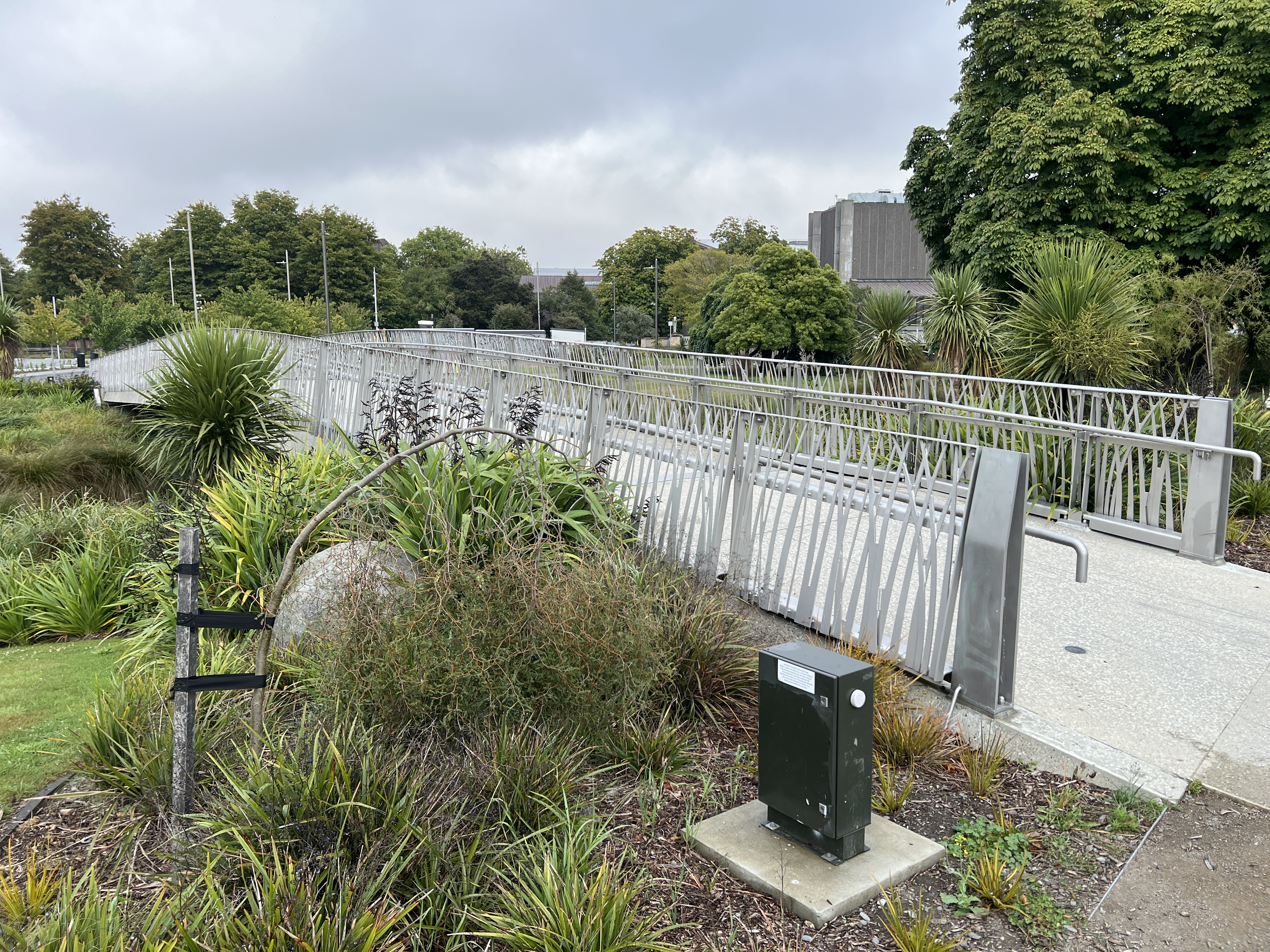
The North Frame pedestrian bridge in 2025

The North Frame pedestrian bridge crosses the Avon River / Ōtākaro. The bridge was built and funded by the earthquake rebuild agency Ōtākaro Limited. It is 32 metres long and is located within Te Papa Ōtākaro Avon River Precinct.

A $90,000 design competition for the bridge in 2017 received 13 designs. To the disappointment of the designers, the Christchurch City Council decided not to use any of them due to concerns about maintenance costs. The bridge was opened in November 2021. In December 2023 the bridge's ownership was transferred from the Crown to the city council.

== South Frame ==
Projects built in the South Frame include a pedestrian and cycle walkway known as the Greenway, as well as a few lane ways and gathering spaces. When the recovery plan was released, 113 properties were designated in the South Frame. However, in January 2015, 60 properties had their South Frame designation removed due to high land prices. By November 2015, the Crown had spent $37 million on compulsory land acquisitions for the South Frame.

In June 2017 the first block of the South Frame opened, between Te Puhoe Lane and Sugarloaf Lane.

=== The Greenway ===
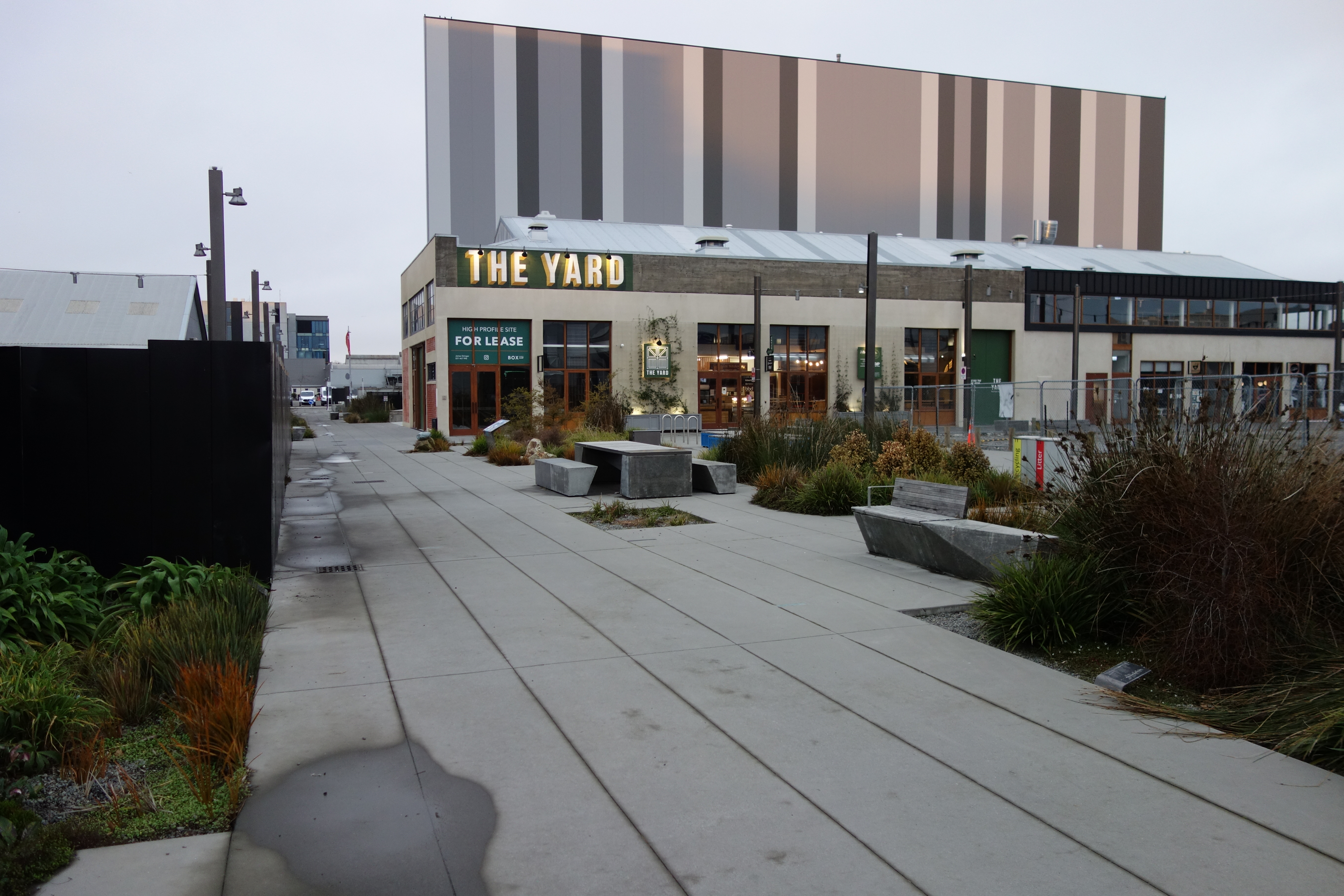
Looking east at Mollett Street, in the Greenway, 2020

The Greenway is an approximate 900-metre-long walkway in the South Frame, between Tuam Street and St Asaph Street. It runs east-west, from near Antigua Street to Manchester Street. The walkway goes through several buildings, which caused problems for the development of the project as a few car dealerships declined to hand over their land. The eastern side of the walkway is near the walkway of the East Frame. The South Frame walkway cost about $92.8 million, of which $61.8 million was spent on land acquisitions. The walkway cost about $100,000 per metre.

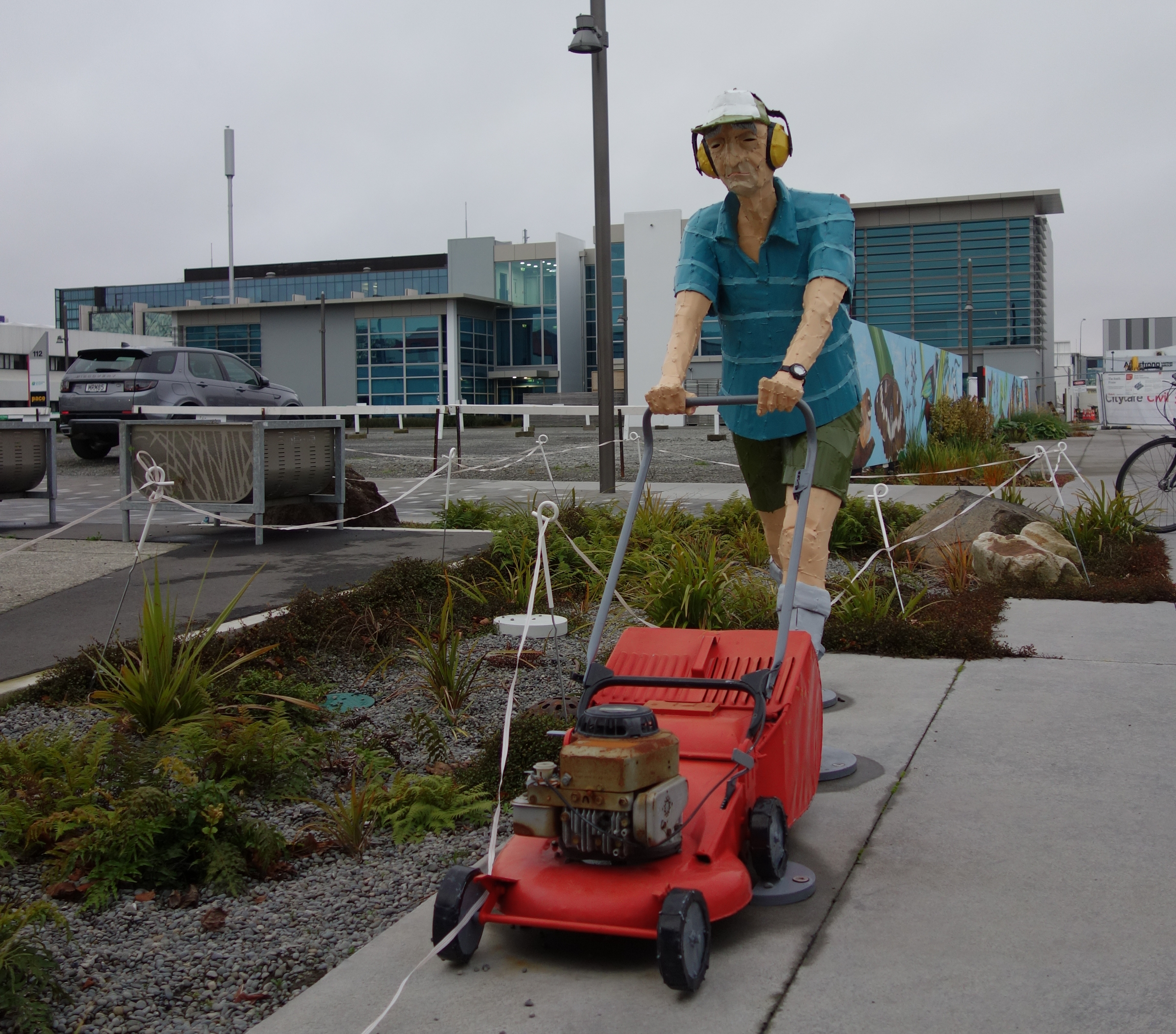
A sculpture of a man and a lawn mower, by Hannah Kidd

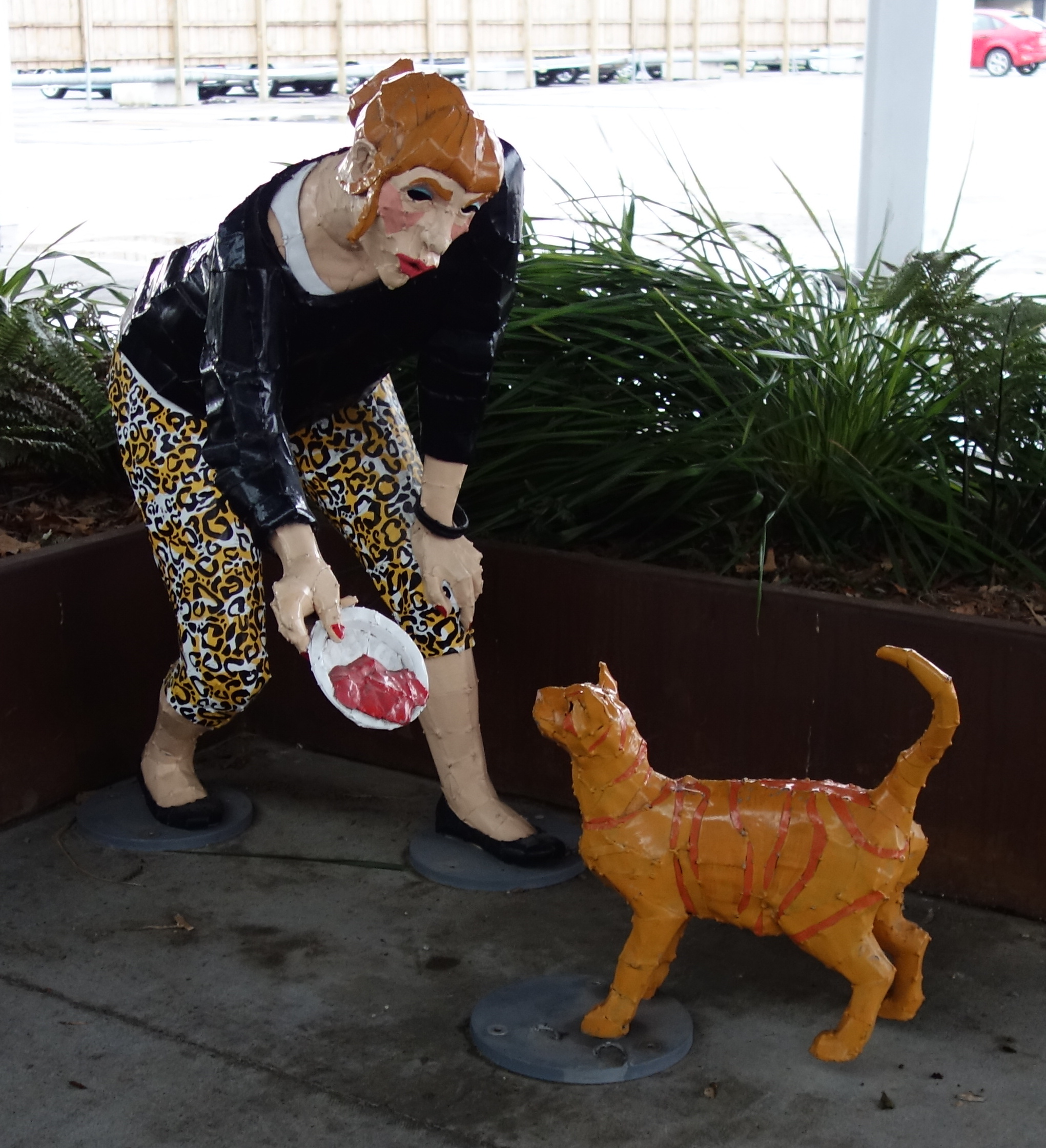
A sculpture of a woman feeding a cat
