= Wearable art =

Designed pieces of clothing or jewelry created as fine or expressive art

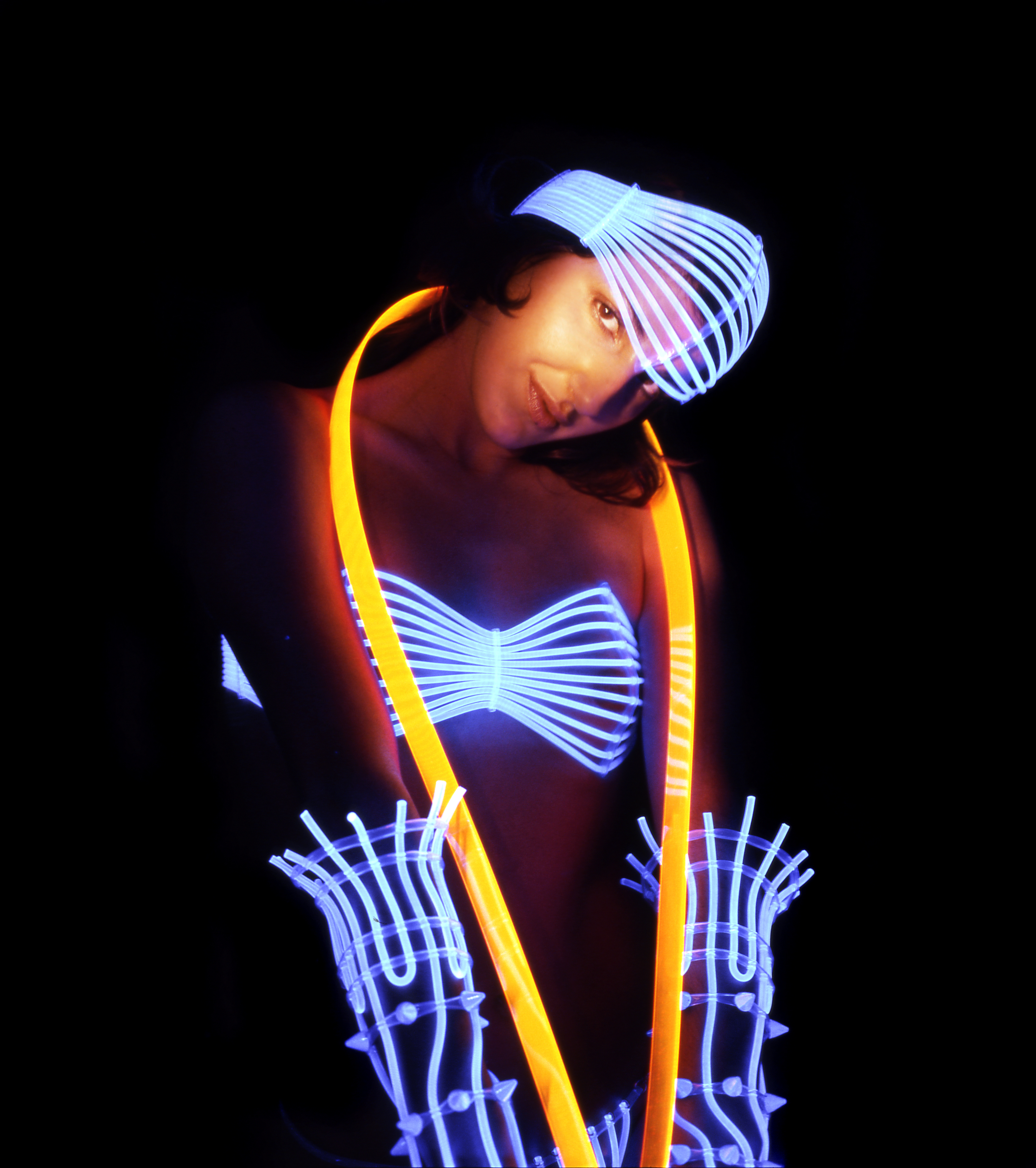
Wearable art by the artist Beo Beyond

Wearable art, also known as Artwear or "art to wear", refers to art pieces in the shape of clothing or jewellery pieces. These pieces are usually handmade, and are produced only once or as a very limited series. Pieces of clothing are often made with fibrous materials and traditional techniques such as crochet, knitting, quilting, but may also include plastic sheeting, metals, paper, and more. While the making of any article of clothing or other wearable object typically involves aesthetic considerations, the term wearable art implies that the work is intended to be accepted as an artistic creation or statement. Wearable art is meant to draw attention while it is being displayed, modeled or used in performances. Pieces may be sold and exhibited.

Wearable art sits at the crossroads of craft, fashion and art. The modern idea of wearable art seems to have surfaced more than once in various forms. Jewellery historians identify a wearable art movement spanning roughly the years 1930 to 1960. Textile and costume historians consider the wearable art movement to have burgeoned in the 1960s, inheriting from the 1850s Arts and Crafts.

It grew in importance in the 1970s, fueled by hippie and mod subcultures, and alongside craftivism, fiber arts and feminist art. Artists identifying with this movement are overwhelmingly women. In the late 1990s, wearable art became difficult to distinguish from fashion, and the 2000s-2010s began integrating new materials such as electronics.

== History ==
=== Origins ===
The wearable art movement inherits from the Arts and Crafts movement, which sought to integrate art in everyday life and objects. Carefully handmade clothing was considered as a device for self-articulation and furthermore, a strategy to avoid the disempowerment of fashion users and designers by large-scale manufacturing.

The term wearable art emerges around 1975 to distinguish artworks made to be worn from body art and performance. It was used alongside the terms Artwear and "Art to Wear". An artistic movement primarily based in the United States due to a combination of financial and educational support, it found echoes in fiber and feminist arts around the world.

=== In the United States ===
In the United States, the Wearable Art movement can be traced to the early twentieth century American Craft Revival. The American Craft Revival draws on different movements seeking to unify art and craft and empower craftspersons and artists such as Japonisme, Art Nouveau, the Vienna Secession and later the Bauhaus. During and shortly after World War Two, wealthy patrons set up educational and museum institutions, in particular the American Craft Council and the Museum of Contemporary Crafts, to support the renewal of crafts education. It enabled artists focused on crafts to support themselves and train new generations. For instance, famed Bauhaus weaver Anni Albers taught weaving at Black Mountain College from 1938, before chairing the craft department of California College of Arts and Crafts from 1960 to 1976.

Art schools were essential to the development of the Art to Wear movement. In the late sixties, a group of students at Cranbrook Academy of Art and the Pratt Institute began integrating textile techniques in their design projects. They counted among their ranks several major figures of the Art to Wear movement, including designer Jean Cacicedo. The best known galleries supporting Wearable Art were Obiko (founded in 1972 by Sandra Sakata) in San Francisco, and Julie: Artisans' Gallery (founded in 1973 by Julie Schafler-Dale) in New York.

=== Outside the United States ===
Crafts and art education being more separated outside of the United States, it is harder to identify wearable art as an independent artistic movement. However, renewed interest in traditional textile crafts such as shibori dyeing sparked the interest of artists worldwide.

==== Japanese avant-garde fashion ====
Japan played a significant role in defining wearable art during the 1970s and 1980s through the work of designers such as Rei Kawakubo, Issey Miyake, and Yohji Yamamoto. Scholars have described these designers as part of an "anti-fashion" movement that transformed garments into conceptual and sculptural forms.

==== African ceremonial dress and beadwork ====
Across Africa, wearable artistic traditions have historically combined aesthetic, ceremonial, spiritual, and political functions. Beadwork, textile arts, and body adornment often communicate identity, social status, lineage, and religious meaning.

==== European conceptual fashion ====
European designers contributed significantly to the development of conceptual and wearable fashion during the late 20th and early 21st centuries. Designers such as Iris van Herpen became known for sculptural garments incorporating 3D printing, digital fabrication, and unconventional materials. Museum exhibitions described her work as a fusion of "artistic expression, craftsmanship and creativity". Designer Alexander McQueen developed theatrical runway presentations frequently described as forms of performance art. The Metropolitan Museum of Art noted that his work expanded fashion "beyond utility to a conceptual expression of culture, politics, and identity".

== Contemporary Wearable Art ==
Wearable art declined as a distinct movement in the late 1990s due to competition from industry, which enabled customization at scale, the migration of artists towards haute couture or the production of small series, and the broader availability of handcrafted garments from around the world. Contemporary takes on wearable art may focus on integrating technologies in garments; using new manufacturing technique to expand possible silhouettes, such as Iris Van Herpen and Damselfrau; revisiting motifs from the art world in couture such as the 2015 Fall couture show Viktor and Rolf; or works used in performance arts such as Nick Cave's Soundsuits. Moreover, works originating from fashion may question everyday wear with provocative pieces. One example is trashion, with artists creating outrageous art garments out of trash.

== Materials and Shapes ==
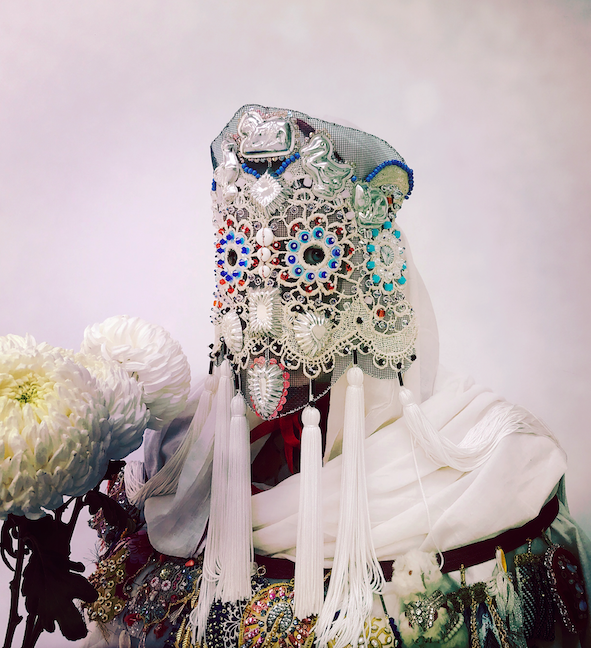
Damselfrau's mask «Jule», made from mixed materials

While wearable art may use any materials or shapes that are worn, there are trends in the techniques and types of pieces produced due to their affordances for artists.

=== Materials ===
==== Fibers ====
Crochet, embroidery, knitting, lace, quilting and felting are all commonly found in wearable art pieces. Crochet remained a homemaker's art until the late 1960s, as new artists began experimenting with free-handed crochet. This practice allowed artists to work in any shape and employ the use of colors freely, without the guidance of a pattern. The work of Janet Lipkin in the 1970s and 1980s is a good example of this technique. Machine knitting, because it enabled the rapid creation of complex knitted designs, was similarly popular as exemplified by the work of Susanna Lewis.

===== Electronics =====
As wearable computing technology develops, increasingly miniaturized and stylized equipment is starting to blend with wearable art esthetics. Low-power mobile computing allows light-emitting and color-changing flexible materials and high-tech fabrics to be used in complex and subtle ways. Some practitioners of the Steampunk movement have produced elaborate costumes and accessories which incorporate a pseudo-Victorian style with modern technology and materials.

=== Shapes ===
==== Kimonos and capes ====
Two recurring shapes in the Art to Wear movement were the kimono and the cape. The kimono enables to rapidly turn a piece of custom fabric into a garment. The cape is similarly easy to assemble and opens many opportunities for performance. The book Cut my cote, presenting patterns from historical folk wear, had a strong influence on the 1970s Art to Wear.

==== Jewelry ====
Some 20th-century modern artists and architects sought to elevate bodily ornamentation — that is, jewellery — to the level of fine art and original design, rather than mere decoration, craft production of traditional designs, or conventional settings for showing off expensive stones or precious metals. Jewelry was used by surrealists, cubists, abstract expressionists, and other modernist artists working in the middle decades of the 20th century.

== Relationship to Fine Arts, Fiber Arts and Performance ==
Wearable artworks can be worn or designed for performances, while artists and sculptors working with fibers or other materials may create wearable pieces. The borders of wearable art are thus fuzzy, apart from artists' self-identification to a given movement or artistic community.

For instance, Electric Dress is a ceremonial wedding kimono-like costume consisting mostly of variously colored electrified and painted light bulbs, enmeshed in a tangle of wires, created in 1956 by the Japanese Gutai artist Atsuko Tanaka. This extreme garment was something like a stage costume, designed only for performance. Similarly, in Nam June Paik's 1969 performance piece called TV Bra for Living Sculpture, Charlotte Moorman played a cello while wearing a brassiere made of two small operating television sets.

== Major exhibitions, events and organizations ==
=== Exhibitions ===
- The Museum of Arts and Design has hosted exhibitions related to Wearable art since 1965
- Art for Wearing, 1979, San Francisco Museum of Modern Art
- Art to Wear, 1987, Museum of Contemporary Art Cleveland
- Artwear: Fashion and Anti-fashion, 2005, De Young Memorial Museum in San Francisco
- Off the Wall: American Art to Wear, 2019-2020, Philadelphia Museum of Art

=== Events ===
- World of Wearable Art Awards, held annually since 1987 and run by Suzie Moncrieff.
- Australian Wearable Art Festival, held annually since 2019.

=== Organizations ===
- Fiberworks Art Center for Textile Arts, founded in 1973, closed 1987 in Berkeley
- World Shibori Network
- World Textile Art

== See also ==
- Fashion accessories
- Steampunk
- Wearable computing
