= Memorials and services for the Canterbury earthquakes =

Memorials for the 2010 and 2011 Canterbury earthquakes include the Crown's official Canterbury Earthquake National Memorial. Unofficial memorials have included the 185 empty chairs and several sculptures and plaques throughout the city of Christchurch. The sites of the former CTV and PGC Buildings, which both collapsed in the 2011 earthquake, serve as memorials. At the Avonhead Park Cemetery in Christchurch, there is an interment site for the unidentified remains of four people who died in the 2011 quake.

Services and commemorative events have included a vigil on the foregrounds of Parliament on 1 March 2011, one week after the earthquake. A memorial day on 18 March was held in Canterbury after the passing of the Canterbury Earthquake Commemoration Day Act 2011. In the River of Flowers ceremony, which is held annually on 22 February, people drop flowers into the Avon River / Ōtākaro in memory of those who died during the 2011 earthquake. Another remembrance tradition is to place flowers in road cones. Several condolence books have been created and signed, including in Parliament House.

== Memorials ==
=== Canterbury Earthquake National Memorial ===
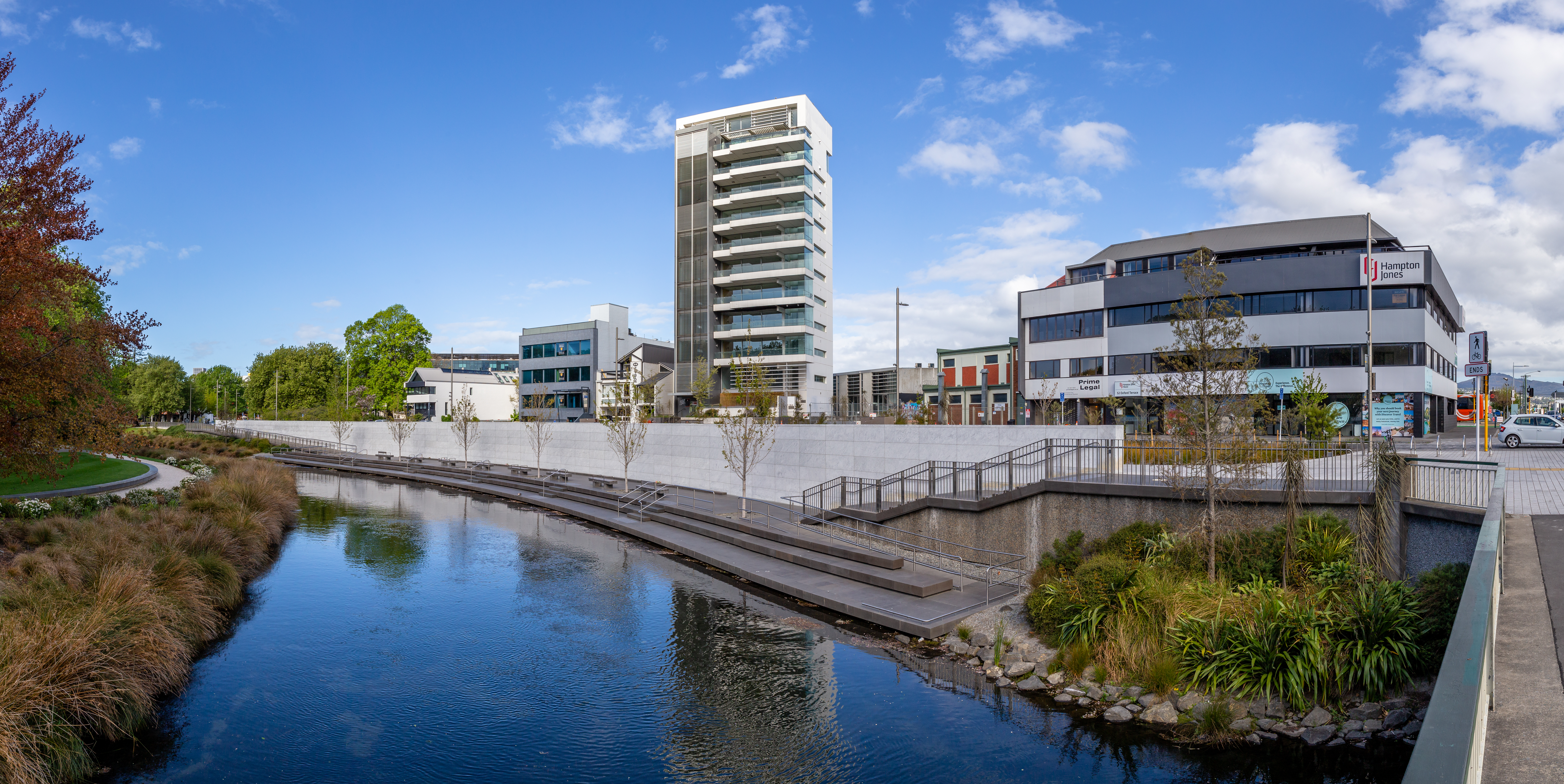
The Canterbury Earthquake National Memorial in 2020

The Canterbury Earthquake National Memorial (Māori: Oi Manawa) is the Crown's official memorial for those killed or seriously injured in the February 2011 earthquake. It is located on both sides of the Avon River / Ōtākaro downstream from the Montreal Street bridge. The memorial opened on 22 February 2017, the sixth anniversary of the earthquake.

Each year at 12:51 pm at 22 February, the anniversaries of the 2011 earthquake, a minute of silence is held. Afterwards the names of all the 185 people who died in the earthquake are read out, with the bell of HMNZS Canterbury being tolled for each name. A wreath is then laid at the memorial and when the ceremony ends, members of the public are encouraged to lay floral tributes.

=== CTV Building site ===
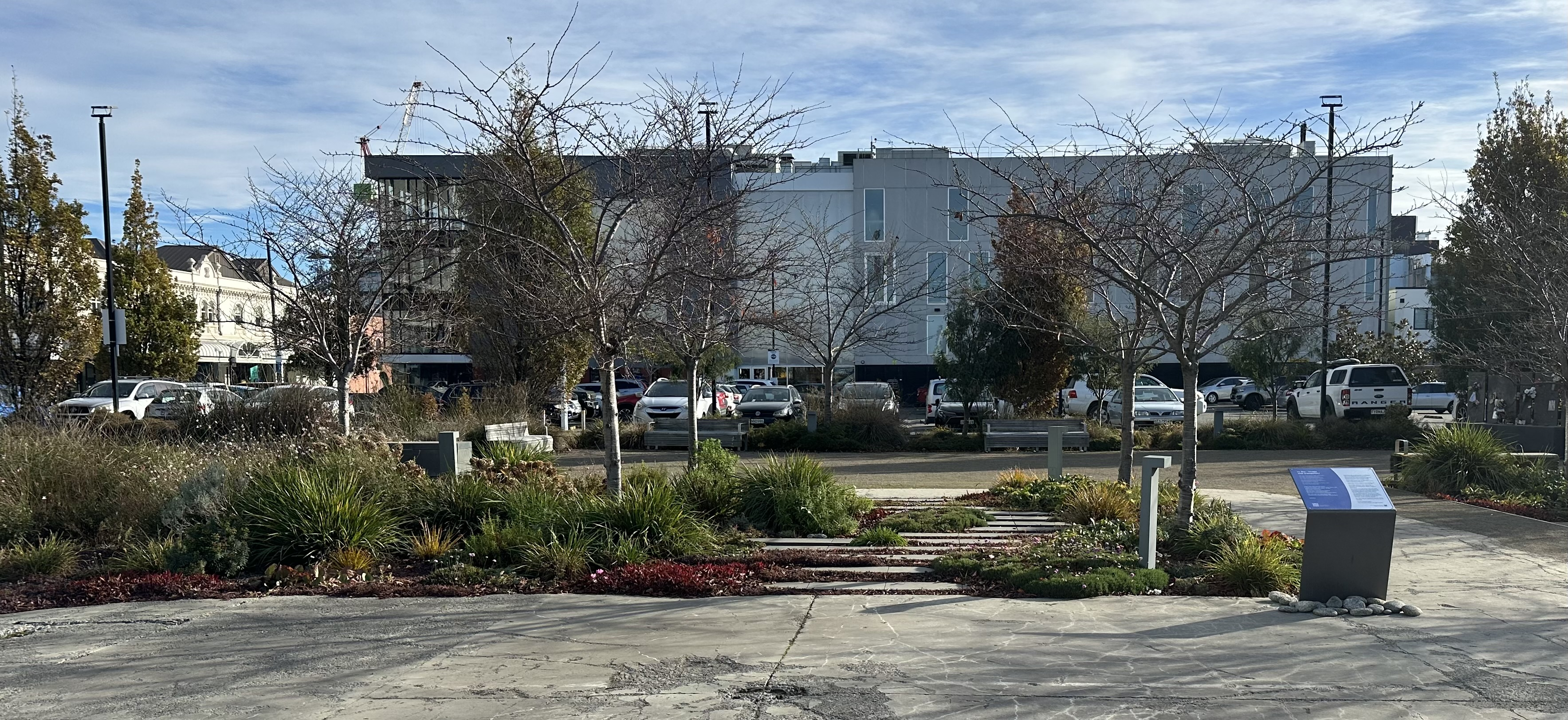
The CTV Building memorial

The collapse of the CTV Building in the February 2011 earthquake resulted in 115 deaths, 62 per cent of the total fatality count of 185 in that earthquake. The site reopened on 21 February 2018, the day before the earthquake's seven year anniversary, as a quiet memorial space, at the request of the families of the victims. Some of the building's foundations were kept in places and there is a memorial plinth on the northwest corner of the former building.

=== PGC Building site ===
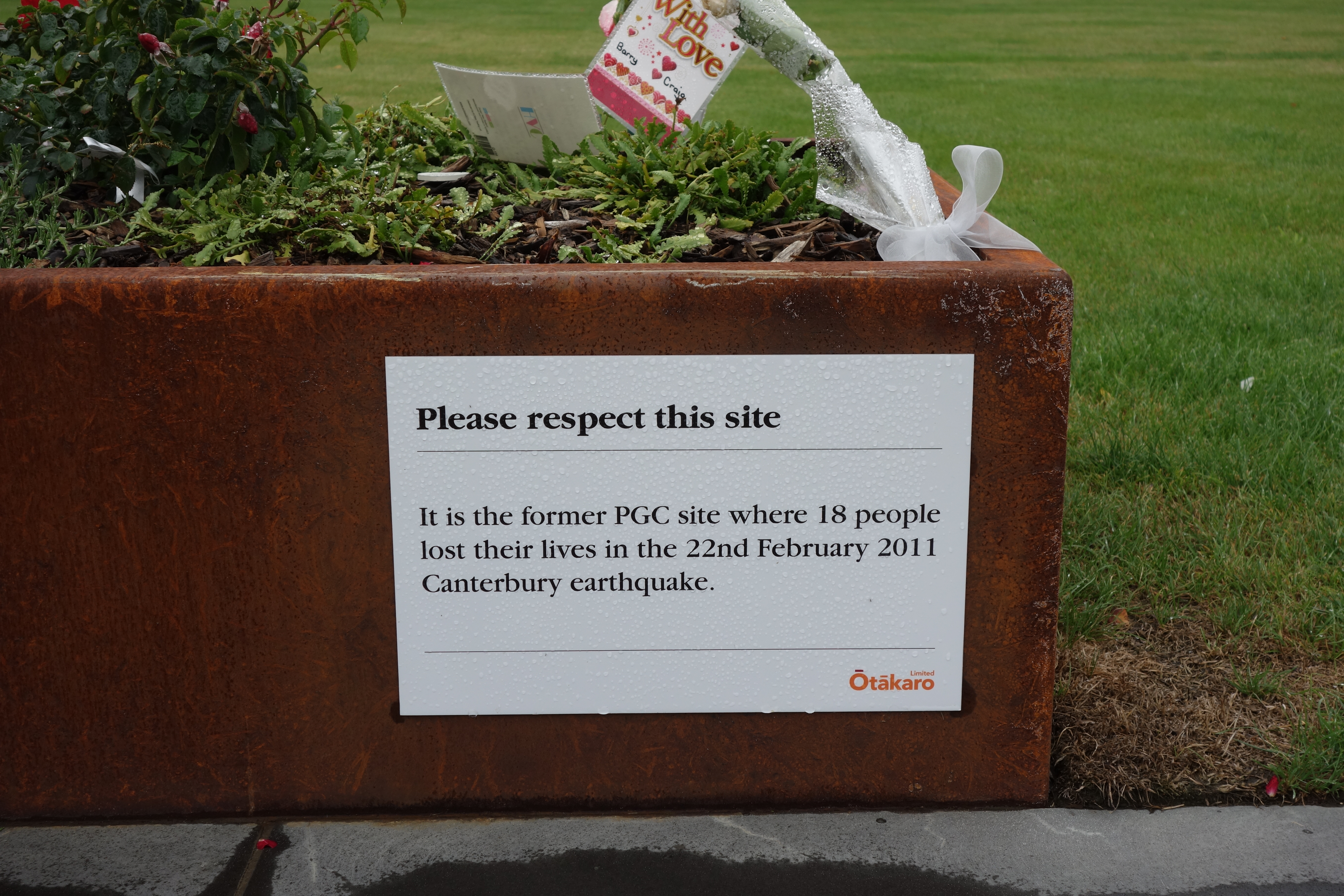
A sign at the PGC Building site telling people to respect the site

The PGC Building collapsed in the February 2011 earthquake, resulting in 18 deaths. The site later became a lawn with a small garden and a few benches. There is a sign at the edge of the site telling people to respect it.

=== 185 empty chairs ===
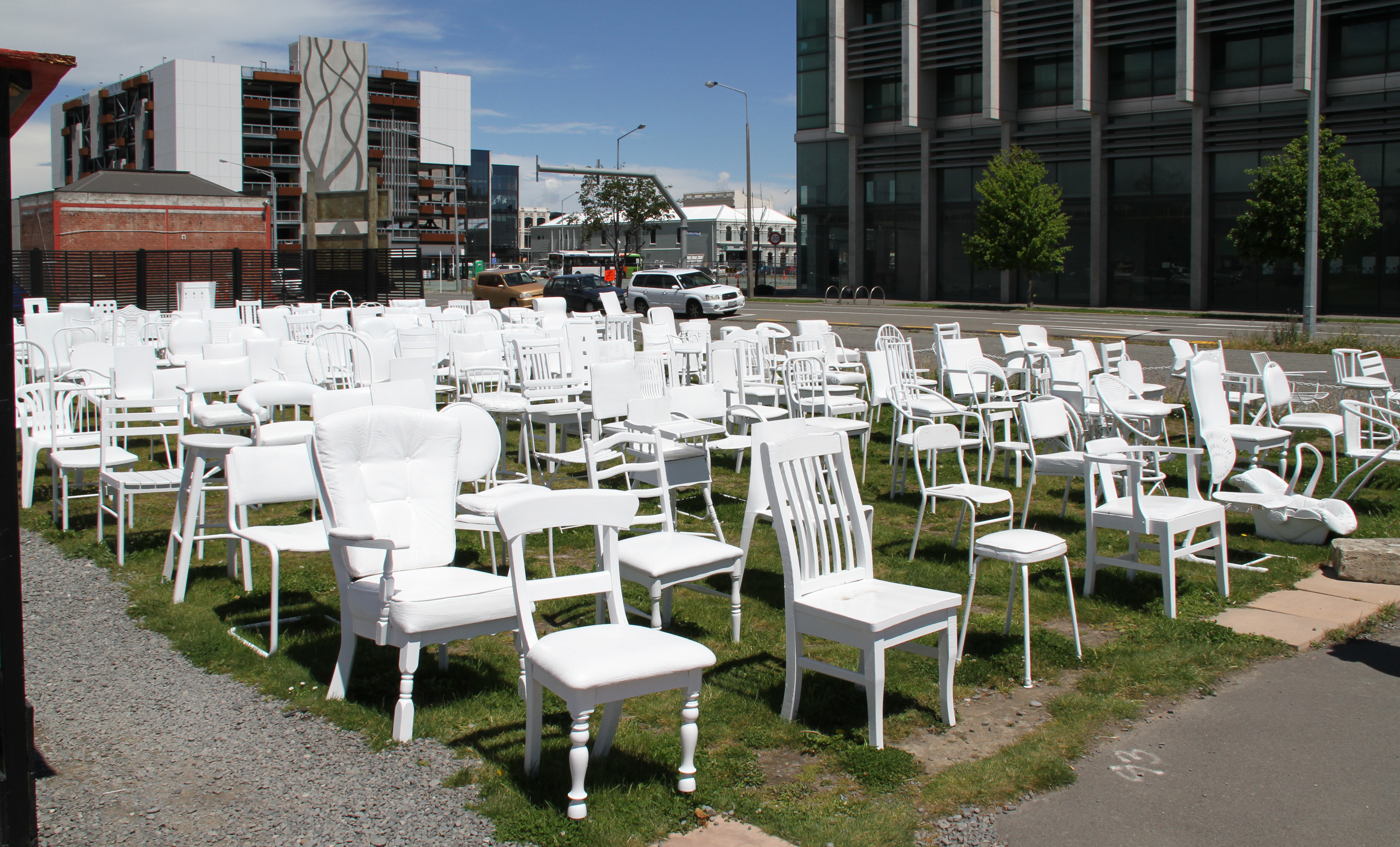
185 empty chairs in 2016

185 empty chairs, also known as 185 white chairs or 185 empty white chairs or simply as 185 chairs, was an unofficial memorial for the 185 individuals who died in the 2011 Christchurch earthquake. Envisaged as a short-term installation made from chairs painted white, it became a major tourist attraction in Christchurch, New Zealand. Installed at the day of the earthquake's first anniversary, it preceded the official earthquake memorial—the Canterbury Earthquake National Memorial—by five years. As of 2017, there was a desire to turn the temporary installation into a permanent fixture. The memorial was closed and the chairs dispersed in April 2023.

=== Art ===
The Spires sculpture in Latimer Square was installed in 2014. Made by sculptor Neil Dawson, it was inspired by the former spire of Christ Church Cathedral, destroyed in the February 2011 earthquake.

The sculpture Extant by Graham Bennett was designed for and dedicated to the victims of the CTV Building collapse. It was installed at Knox Plaza in June 2015.

At the University of Canterbury is a sculpture named Roimata, made by Riki Manuel. On the sculpture is a plaque that says that the university's cycleway is dedicated "to the courage and contribution of the University community following the 2010–2011 Canterbury earthquakes."

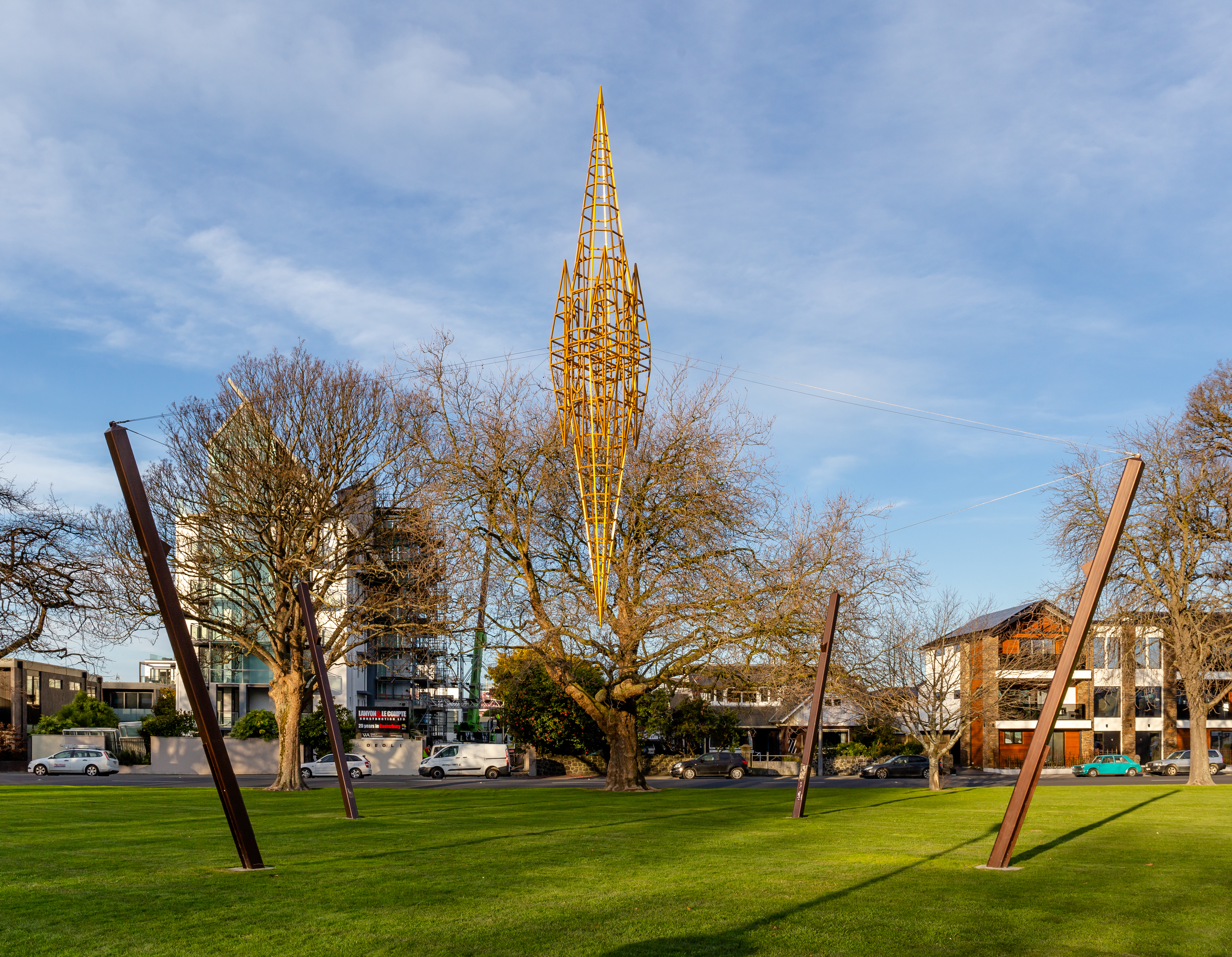
Spires in 2019

=== Interment site ===
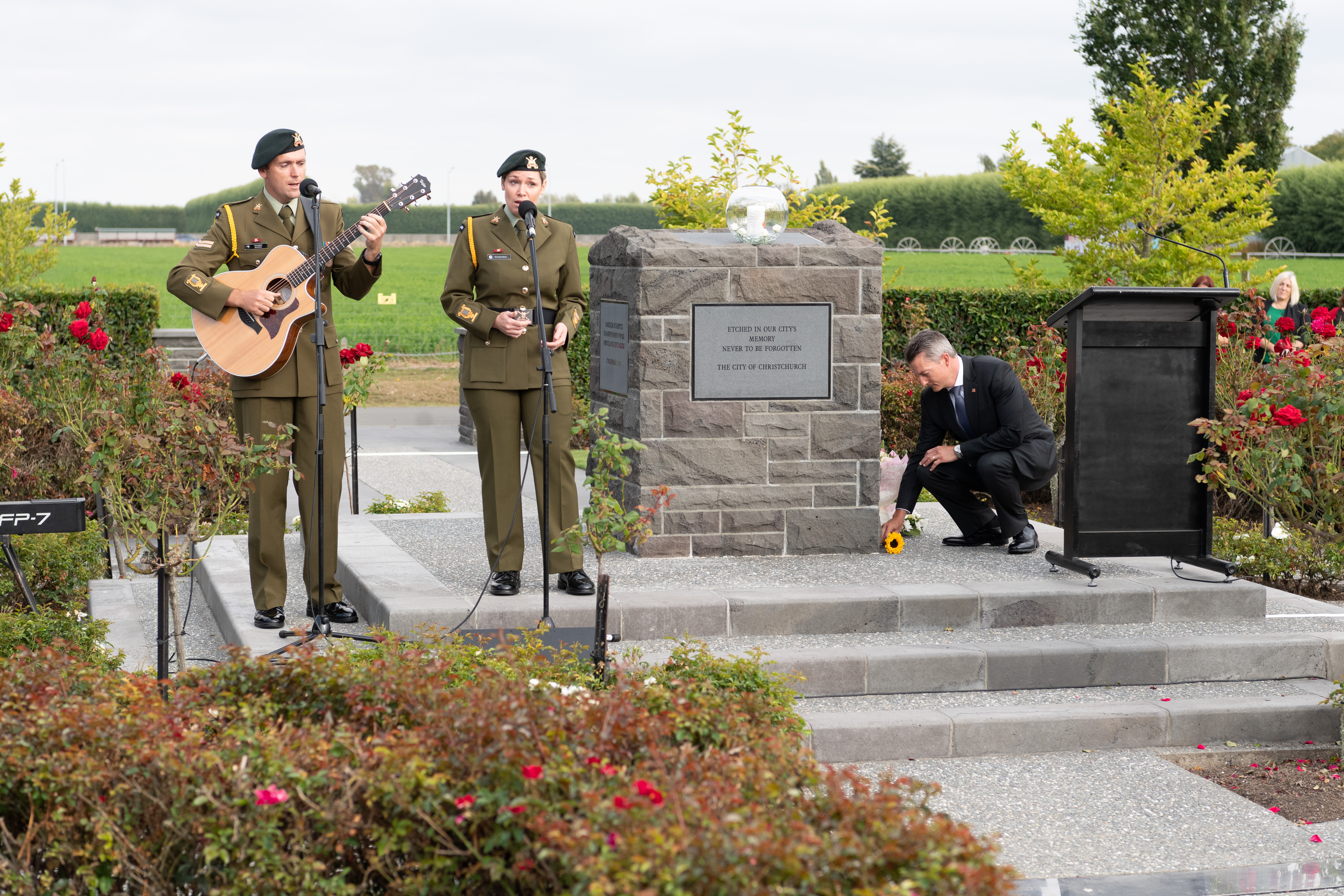
The interment site on the 10th anniversary of the 2011 earthquake

There is an interment site at the Avonhead Park Cemetery for the unidentified remains of four people who died in the February 2011 earthquake. The remains could not be identified because they were burnt by the fire in the CTV Building after it collapsed. The gravesite was unveiled on 21 February 2012, the day before the earthquake's first anniversary. On the day afterwards, it was opened to the public.

The centrepiece of the site has six plaques, each with the text "Etched in our City’s memory, never to be forgotten. The City of Christchurch". Each plaque is written either in English, Māori, Filipino, Spanish, Russian or Braille.

=== Miscellaneous ===
A section of the former Medway Street footbridge, which became twisted in the September 2010 earthquake, sits on the bank of the Avon River / Ōtākaro to serve as a memorial. It was placed there in 2018. There are signs on both sides of the river providing information about the old bridge.

At City Mall there is a plaque dedicated to the 22 February earthquake.

In February 2023 Our Stories Project Trust created a 30-minute audio walk that goes from Quake City (a part of Canterbury Museum) to the Canterbury Earthquake National Memorial. It has stories told by 30 people who experienced the earthquake, was made in collaboration with Arts Digital Lab of University of Canterbury and was made using some content from the Canterbury Earthquakes Digital Archive (CEISMIC).

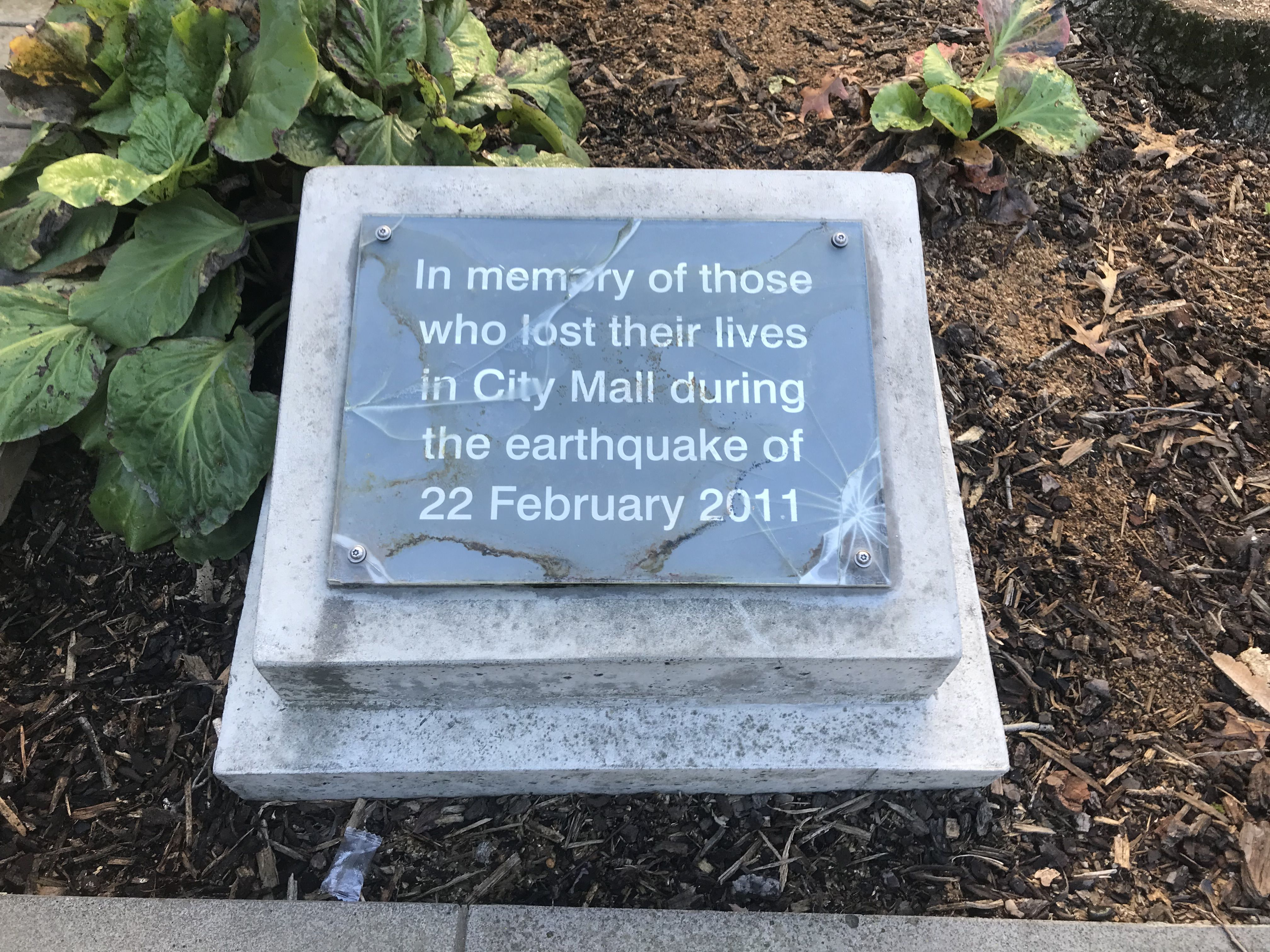
The plaque at City Mall

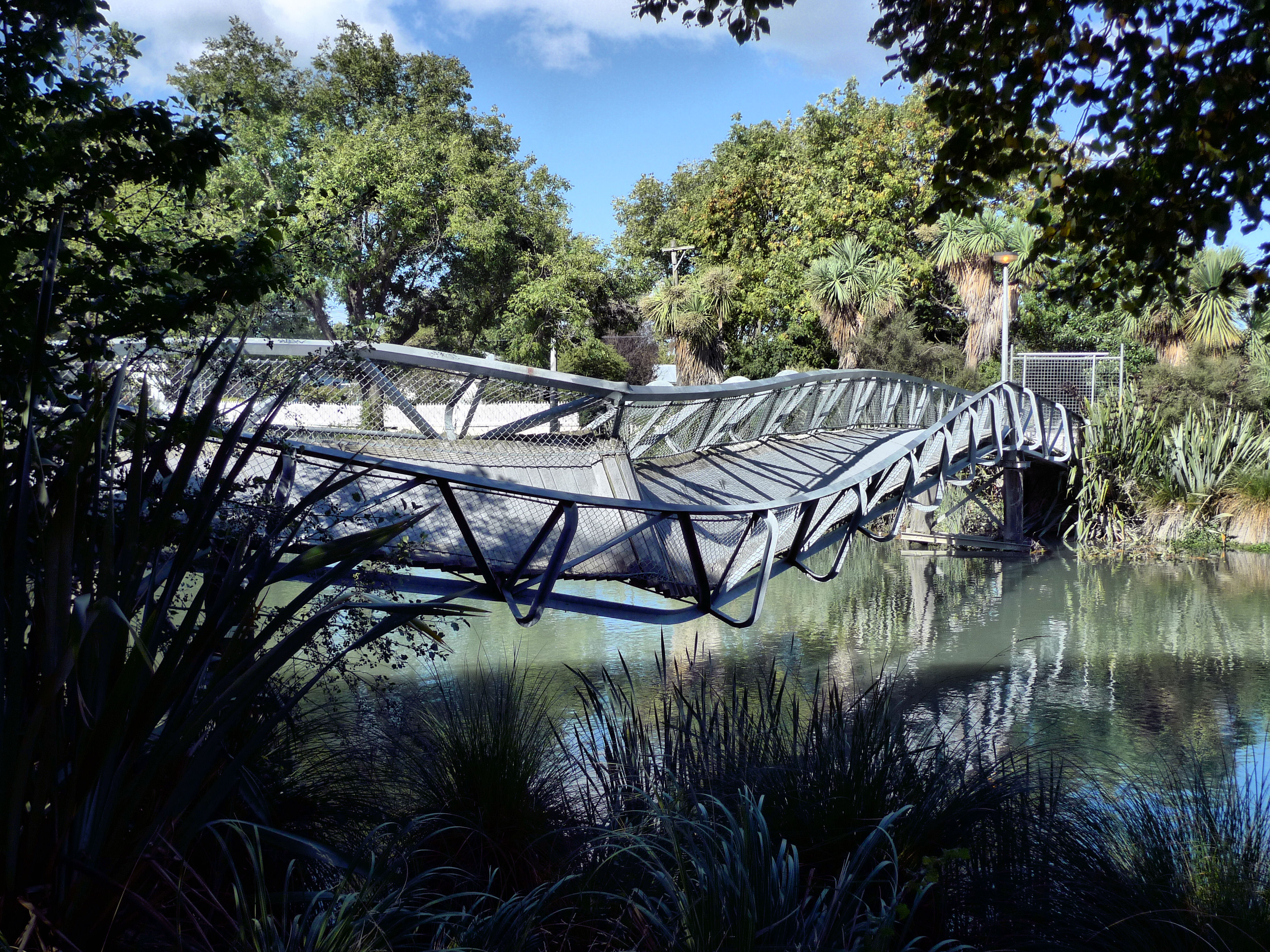
The Medway Street bridge in March 2011, before it was removed

== Services and commemorative events ==
=== First week ===
On 1 March, one week after the February 2011 earthquake, a vigil was held at the forecourt and grounds of Parliament. Over 5,000 members of the public attended at Parliament, as did Governor General Anand Satyanand and Deputy Prime Minister Bill English. A two-minute silence was nationally held at 12:51 pm, exactly a week after the earthquake struck. Church bells were struck throughout the country to signify the beginning and the end of the silence. In Christchurch, over 200 firefighters and rescue workers congregated around the A Tribute to Firefighters memorial for the September 11 attacks for the silence. At the Hanmer Springs Thermal Pools, water slides and spas were turned off and in Wellington, buses and cars were reportedly stopped and pulled over.

Starting at 12:56 pm, the bells of the Wellington Cathedral of St Paul rang a half-muffled peal for 10 minutes. Flags were also flown at half-mast, including at Parliament.

=== Public holiday ===
A national memorial service was held on 18 March at North Hagley Park, coinciding with a one-off provincial holiday for Canterbury, which required the passing of the Canterbury Earthquake Commemoration Day Act 2011 to legislate. Prince William made a two-day trip to the country to tour the areas affected by the earthquake and attended on the Queen's behalf and made an address during the service. New Zealand's governor-general, Sir Anand Satyanand, attended, along with John Key, Bob Parker, and a number of local and international dignitaries. Australia's official delegation included Governor-General Quentin Bryce, Prime Minister Julia Gillard, and Opposition Leader Tony Abbott.

=== 22 February 2012 ===
On the first anniversary of the February 2011 earthquake, a memorial service was held at Hagley Park, which was attended by thousands. The New Zealand flags on government and public buildings throughout the country were flown at half-mast.

=== September 2020 ===
On 3–4 September 2020, for the 10th anniversary of the 2010 Canterbury earthquake, several structures in Christchurch were lit up with green lights at night. Green was chosen because it "is associated with growth and renewal". The structures included New Regent Street, the Christchurch Town Hall Ferrier fountain, the East Frame's Vaka 'a Hina sculpture, Neil Dawson's Fanfare sculpture, Christchurch Airport, and the New Brighton Pier and the State Highway 1 Memorial Bridge. There was initially going to be an event, but it was cancelled due to the COVID-19 pandemic.

=== 2021 memorial service ===
A memorial service was held at the Canterbury Earthquake National Memorial on 22 February 2021 to mark ten years since the earthquake and was attended by Christchurch Mayor Lianne Dalziel, Governor-General Dame Patsy Reddy and Prime Minister Jacinda Ardern. A minute's silence was held at 12:51 pm, and the names of all the victims were read aloud by Christchurch residents and first responders, before a wreath laying ceremony at the memorial. At the request of the prime minister, the New Zealand flags on all government and public buildings throughout the country were flown at half-mast.

=== River of Flowers ===
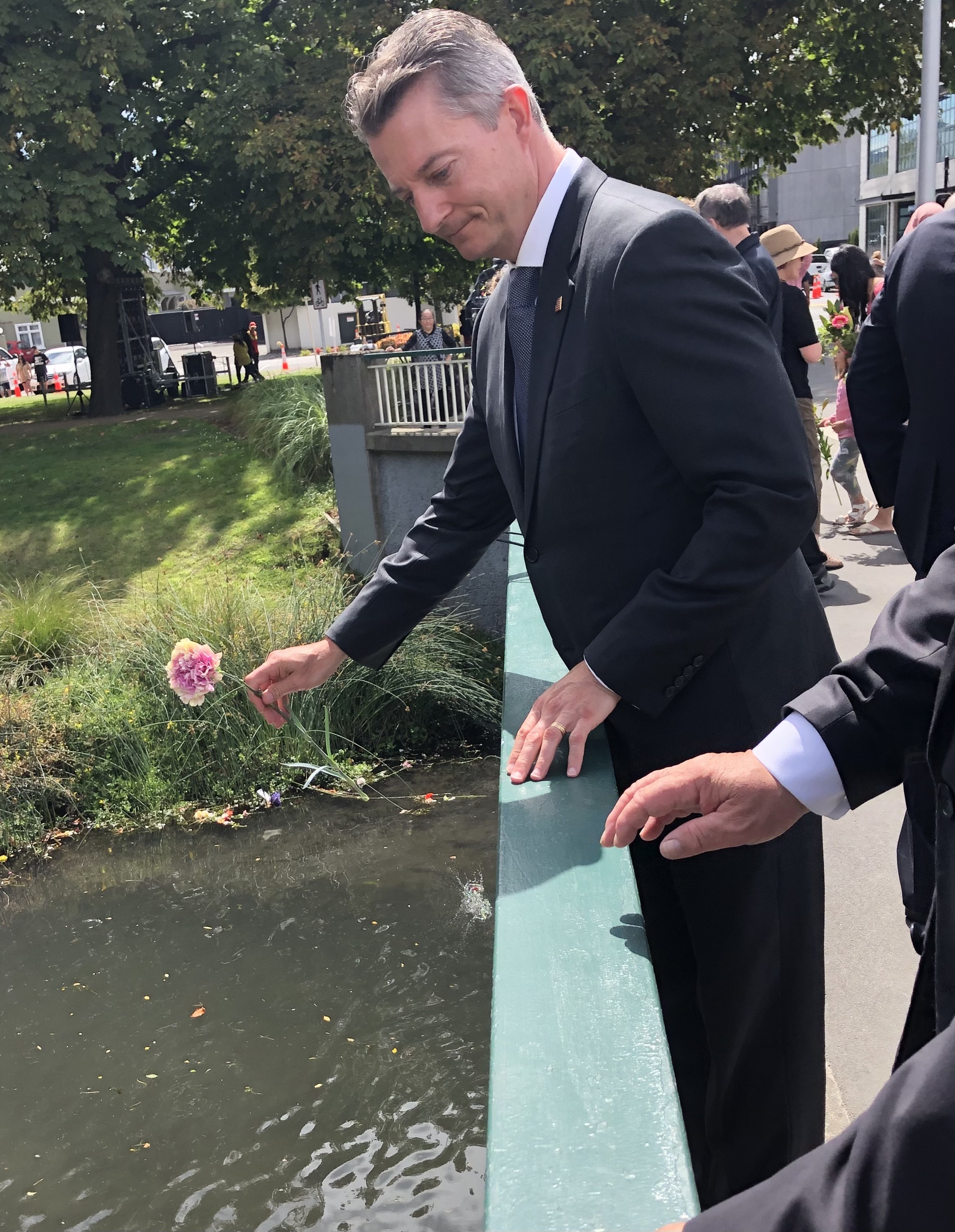
A man dropping a flower into the Avon River / Ōtākaro

The River of Flowers ceremony, in which members of the public drop flowers into the Avon River / Ōtākaro in memory of those who died during the earthquake, was inaugurated on the first anniversary of the event (22 February 2012) and remains an annual commemorative ritual. The event was created by Michelle Whitaker of Healthy Christchurch and Evan Smith of Avon-Otakaro Network.

The events have included people writing messages and placing them on several Trees of Hope.

In the 2013 ceremony, the quake-damaged Medway Street footbridge was farewelled. It was removed a few months later.

=== Flowers in road cones ===
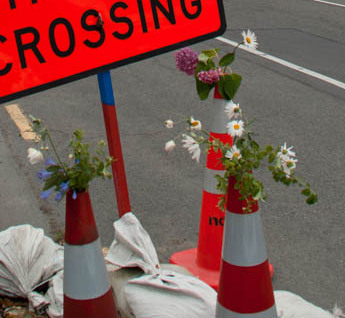
Flowers in road cones, 2014

Before the first anniversary of the February 2011 earthquake, Christchurch artist Henry Sunderland created a cartoon that encouraged people to place flowers in road cones on the first anniversary, as an act of remembrance. After Sunderland posted the cartoon on facebook and it received over 4,000 shares within a few days, people in several countries followed the suggestion on 22 February 2012.

In 2021, the University of Canterbury put wheelbarrows with roses in them on University Drive so that people could place them in road cones.

== Condolence books ==
A condolence book was set up in Parliament House, which was signed by both the public and the Diplomatic corps. The council of Christchurch, Dorset, in England, which is a twin town with New Zealand's Christchurch, created four condolence books. In the High Commission of New Zealand in London, Prince Charles, Prince Philip, Prince William and his fiancée Kate Middleton, as well as Prince Harry signed the condolence book. Fiji Prime Minister Frank Bainimarama signed the condolence book in the high commission in Fiji.
