= Oxford Terrace Baptist Church =

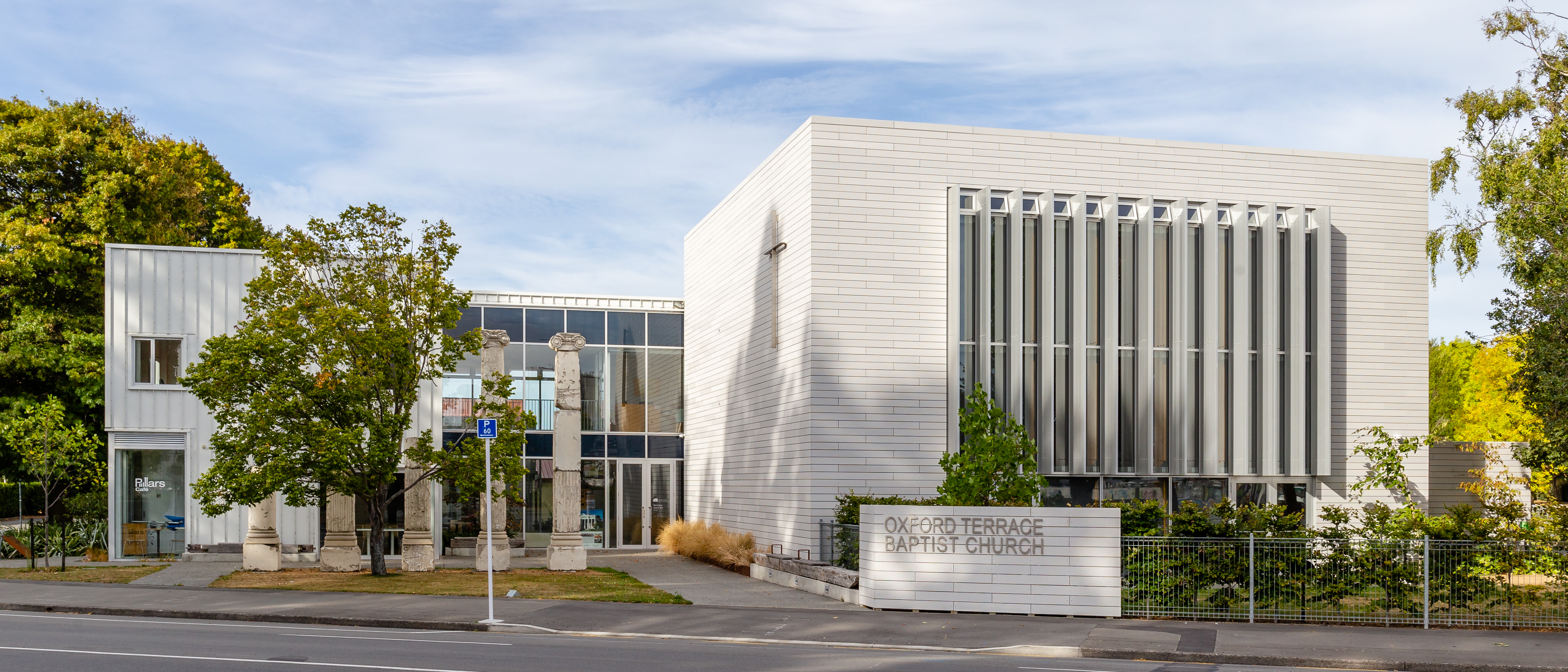
- Oxford Terrace Baptist Church in 2020
- Oxford Terrace Baptist Church
- 43°31′38″S 172°38′35″E
- Address: 286 Oxford Terrace, Christchurch Central City, Christchurch
- Country: New Zealand
- Denomination: Baptist
- Website: otbc.org.nz

History
- Status: Church

Architecture
- Functional status: Active
- Architectural type: Church
- Style: Modernist
- Completed: 24 December 2017
- Construction cost: NZ$8.5 million

Specifications
- Capacity: 250 people

Oxford Terrace Baptist Church (former)
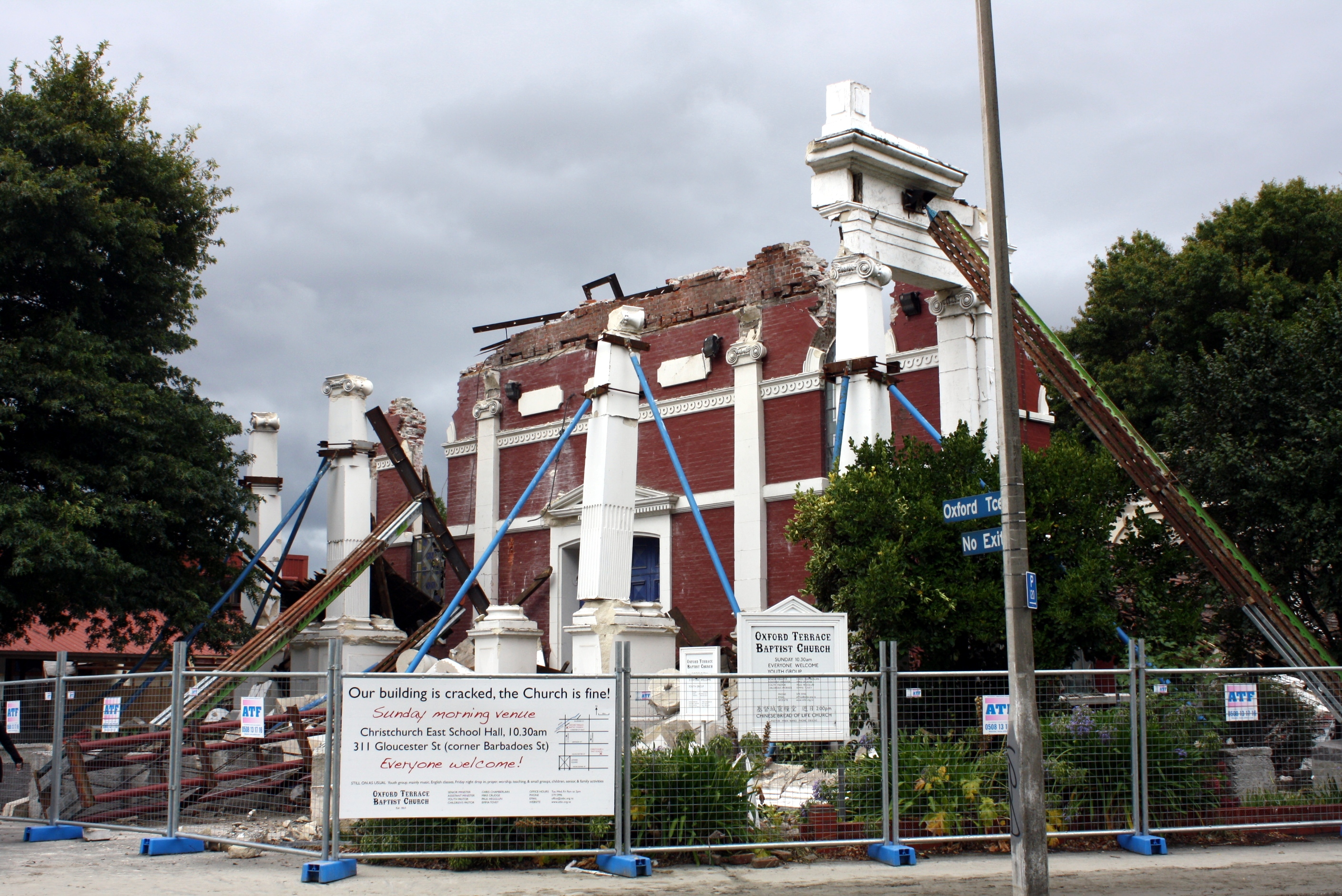
- The building after the collapse caused by the February 2011 Christchurch earthquake
- Oxford Terrace Baptist Church (former)
- 43°31′38″S 172°38′35″E
- Country: New Zealand
- Previous denomination: Baptist

History
- Status: Church (1882 – 2010)
- Events: 2010 Canterbury earthquake; 2011 Christchurch earthquake

Architecture
- Functional status: Building collapsed
- Architect: Edward J. Saunders
- Architectural type: Church
- Style: Neoclassical style
- Completed: 9 July 1882
- Construction cost: NZ£3,130
- Closed: 4 September 2010
- Demolished: 22 February 2011

Specifications
- Capacity: 600 people

Heritage New Zealand – Category 2
- Official name: Oxford Terrace Baptist Church
- Designated: 10 September 2004
- Delisted: June 2011
- Reference no.: 1853

Oxford Terrace Baptist Church is a Baptist church located in the Christchurch Central City on a prominent corner property fronting the Avon River. It is affiliated with the Baptist Churches of New Zealand.

The original building was significantly damaged in the 2010 Canterbury earthquake and collapsed in the subsequent February 2011 Christchurch earthquake. This building had a Category II listing by the New Zealand Historic Places Trust. A new building was opened on Christmas Eve 2017.

== History ==
The Christchurch Baptist congregation was founded in 1863 by 19 settlers from England. Decimus Dolamore, who was instrumental for establishing the Baptist faith in New Zealand, was the first minister. The congregation first met in the town hall in High Street. In 1864, a church was built in Lichfield Street opposite where the Bus Exchange is located (as of 2011). The congregation split in 1867, but reunited in 1870 and built a church in Hereford Street. The congregation decided to build larger premises and purchased land for £1,325 on the corner of Oxford Terrace and Madras Street, overlooking the Avon River.

=== Demolished church building ===
A design competition was won by local architect Edward J. Saunders. The congregation decided, though, that the total costs of the project was beyond their means. As an interim measure, the Hereford Street church was transported to the new site. Much public amusement was caused when the church sat on a wagon next to ChristChurch Cathedral for a weekend in 1879. Three weeks after arriving at the new site, the building was damaged by fire, but opened again some months later. The older building was in use until 1903, when it once again caught fire.

Tenders for the new church were called for in August 1881, but the prices submitted were too high, ranging from £3,956 to £5,337. A revised tender in September 1881 received a quote of £3,130 by Morey and McHale, which was accepted. The Reverend C. Dallaston laid the foundation stone on 14 October 1881 and the project was completed and opened to the public on 9 July 1882. At that point, it was the largest Baptist church in the country. An organ was imported from England and installed in 1915.

The main building was significantly damaged in the 4 September 2010 earthquake and collapsed in the subsequent 22 February 2011 earthquake. It was demolished in late June 2011 following further collapse in the 13 June 2011 earthquake.

==== Heritage listing ====
On 10 September 2004, the church was registered by the New Zealand Historic Places Trust as a Category II historic place, with the registration number being 1853. It is significant for its Neoclassical architecture, which is unusual for Christchurch. The church had the last remaining temple frontage in the city.

In 2011, Peter Beck, the dean of ChristChurch Cathedral, listed the Oxford Terrace Baptist Church as one of the "iconic churches of the city".

Following the 2011 Christchurch earthquakes, the building was removed from the heritage list and categorised as Lost Heritage.

== Current church building ==
The former site of the church of the church was used for a temporary art installation by Peter Majendie, unveiled at the first anniversary of the February 2011 earthquake. The installation, called Reflection of Loss of Lives, Livelihoods and Living in Neighbourhood, used 185 chairs all painted in white but of different shapes, reflecting the different personalities of those who died. The artwork became known as 185 empty chairs. Within a year, the installation moved to a different site, and in 2017, discussions started to make the artwork permanent.

In March 2016, The Press revealed that a modern replacement church had gained resource consent. The NZ$8.5 million project will create a two-storey building with an auditorium for 250 people; NZ$1.5 million has yet to be fund-raised. The church was reopened on Christmas Eve 2017.

== Gallery ==
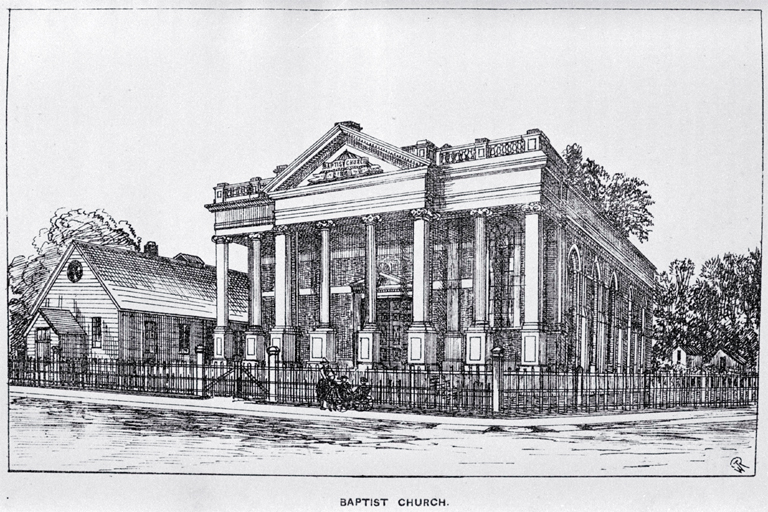
View of the church in 1885. The wooden building on the left is the older church transported to here from the Hereford Street site

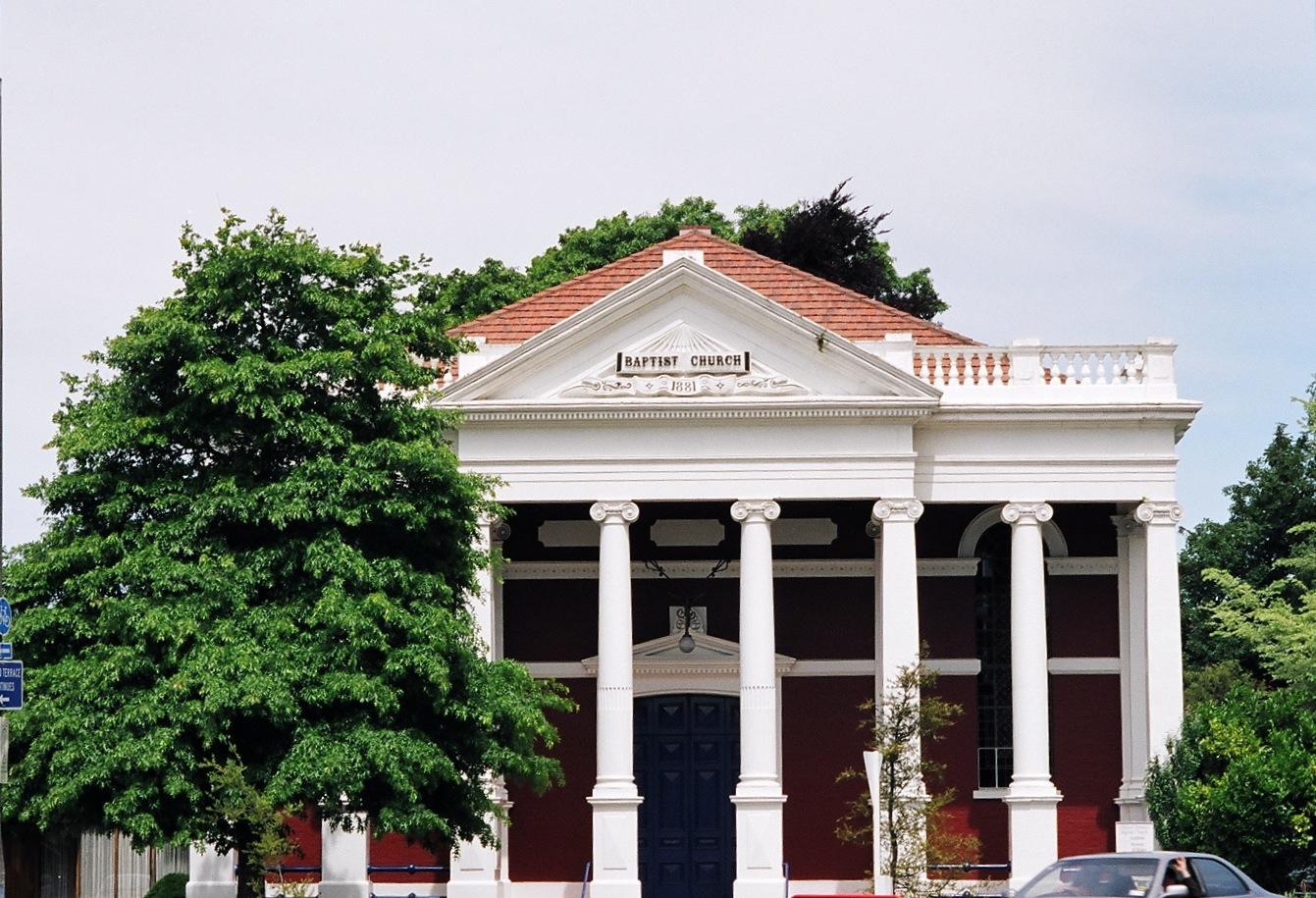
Oxford Terrace Baptist Church in 2008

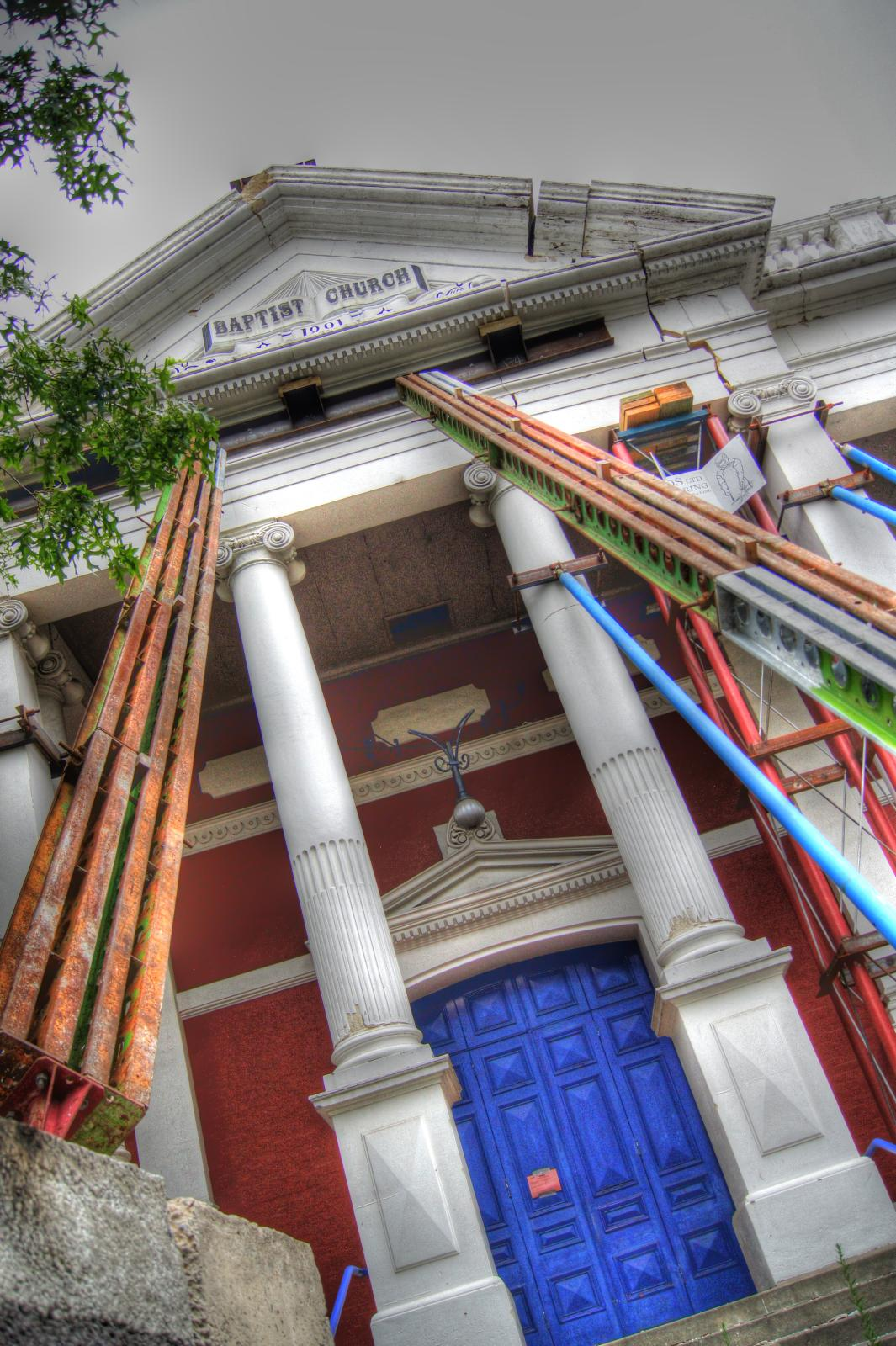
View of the church after the 2010 Canterbury earthquake, with props holding up the facade

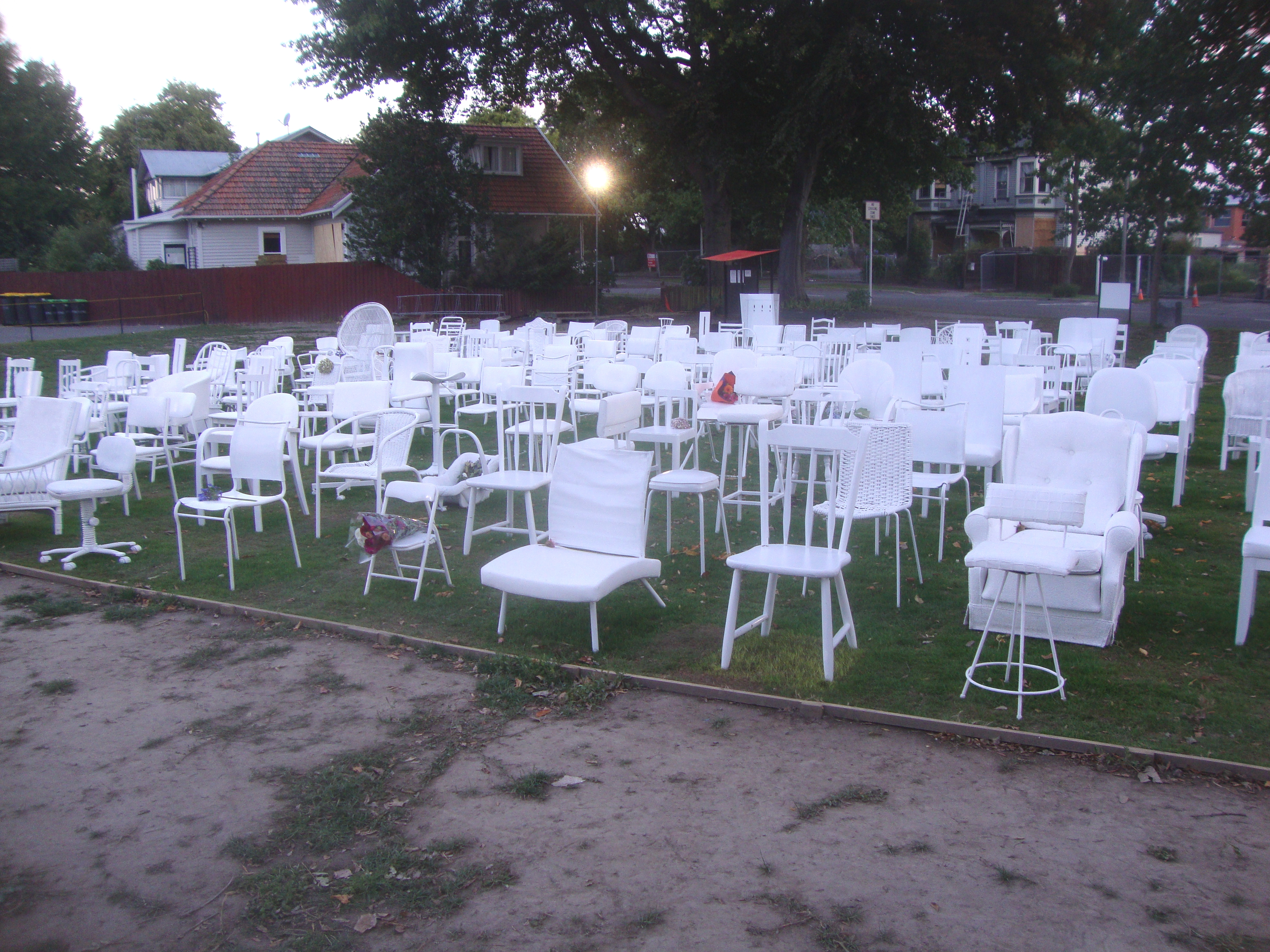
Installation of 185 empty chairs
