= Canterbury Earthquake National Memorial =

Official memorial for victims of the Christchurch earthquake

Coordinates: 43°32′04″S 172°37′53″E

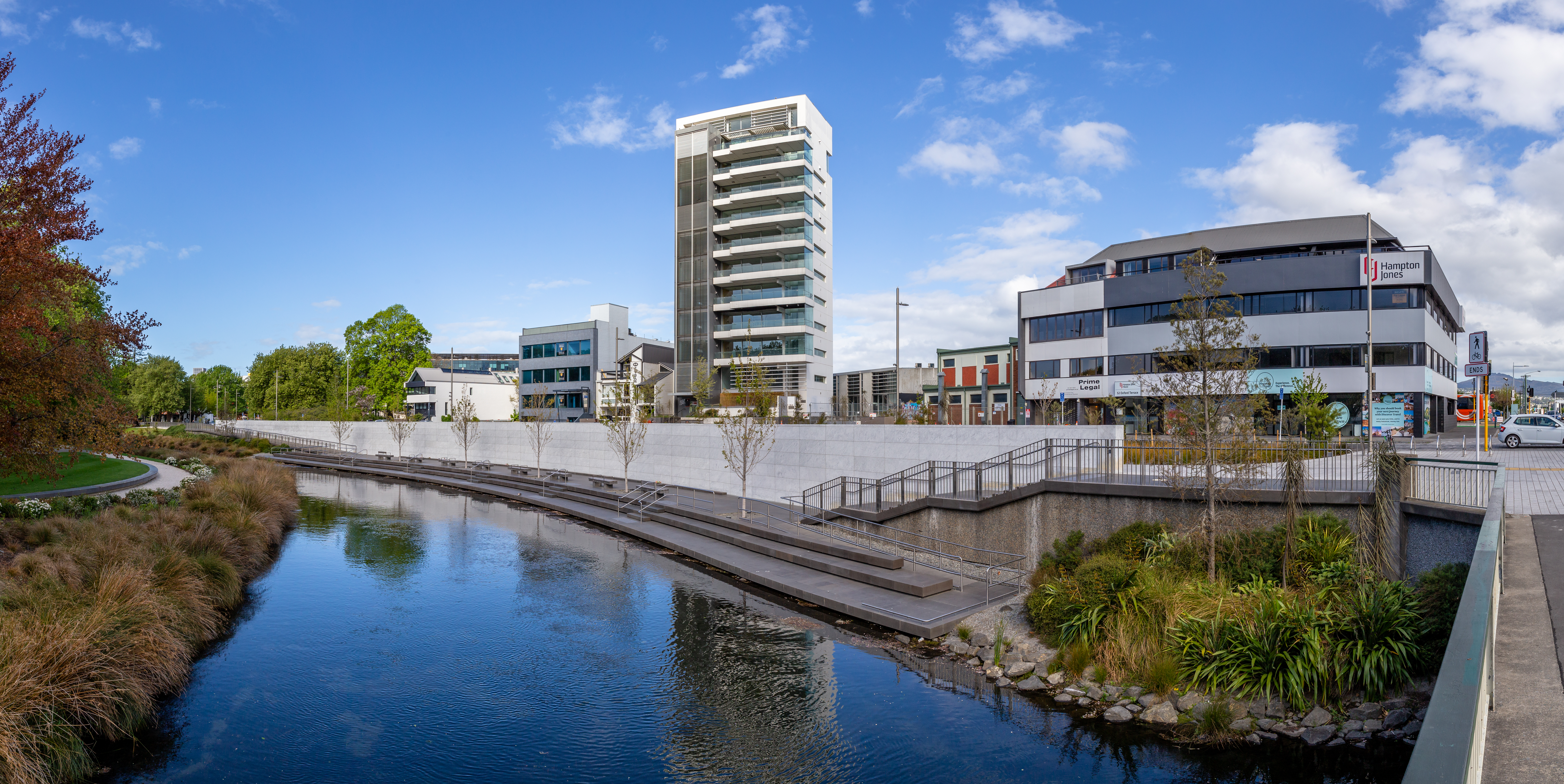
Canterbury Earthquake National Memorial

The Canterbury Earthquake National Memorial (Māori: Oi Manawa) is the Crown's official memorial for those killed or seriously injured in the 22 February 2011 Christchurch earthquake. It is located on both sides of the Avon River / Ōtākaro downstream from the Montreal Street bridge. The memorial opened on 22 February 2017, the sixth anniversary of the earthquake.

== Project development ==
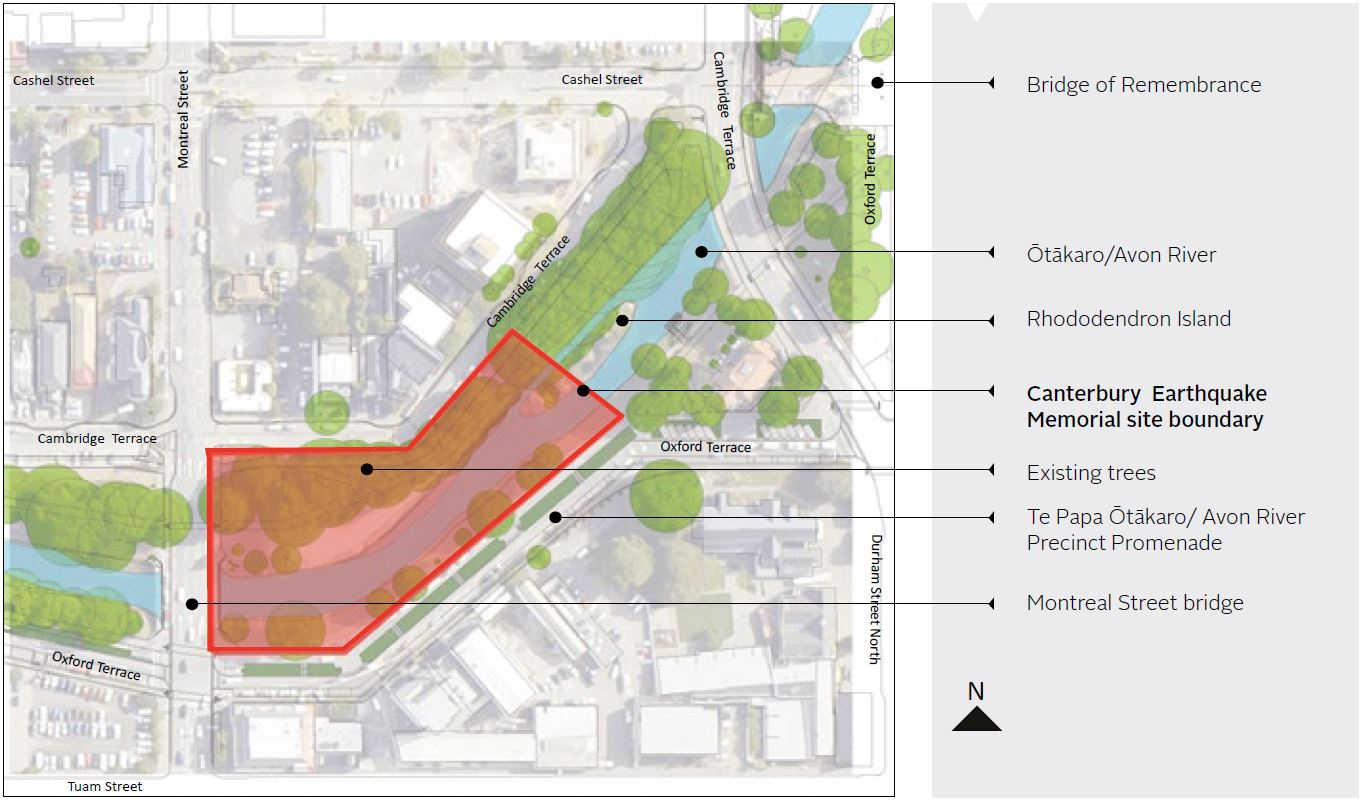
Memorial site

The memorial was one of the projects identified in the Christchurch Central Recovery Plan, commonly referred to as the Blueprint, released on 30 July 2012 by the Canterbury Earthquake Recovery Authority (CERA). The Blueprint gave the first quarter of 2016 as the project finish date in its indicative time line. The project was led by the Ministry for Culture and Heritage, with project partners CERA, Christchurch City Council, and Te Rūnanga o Ngāi Tahu. The purpose of the memorial is described as follows in the Blueprint:

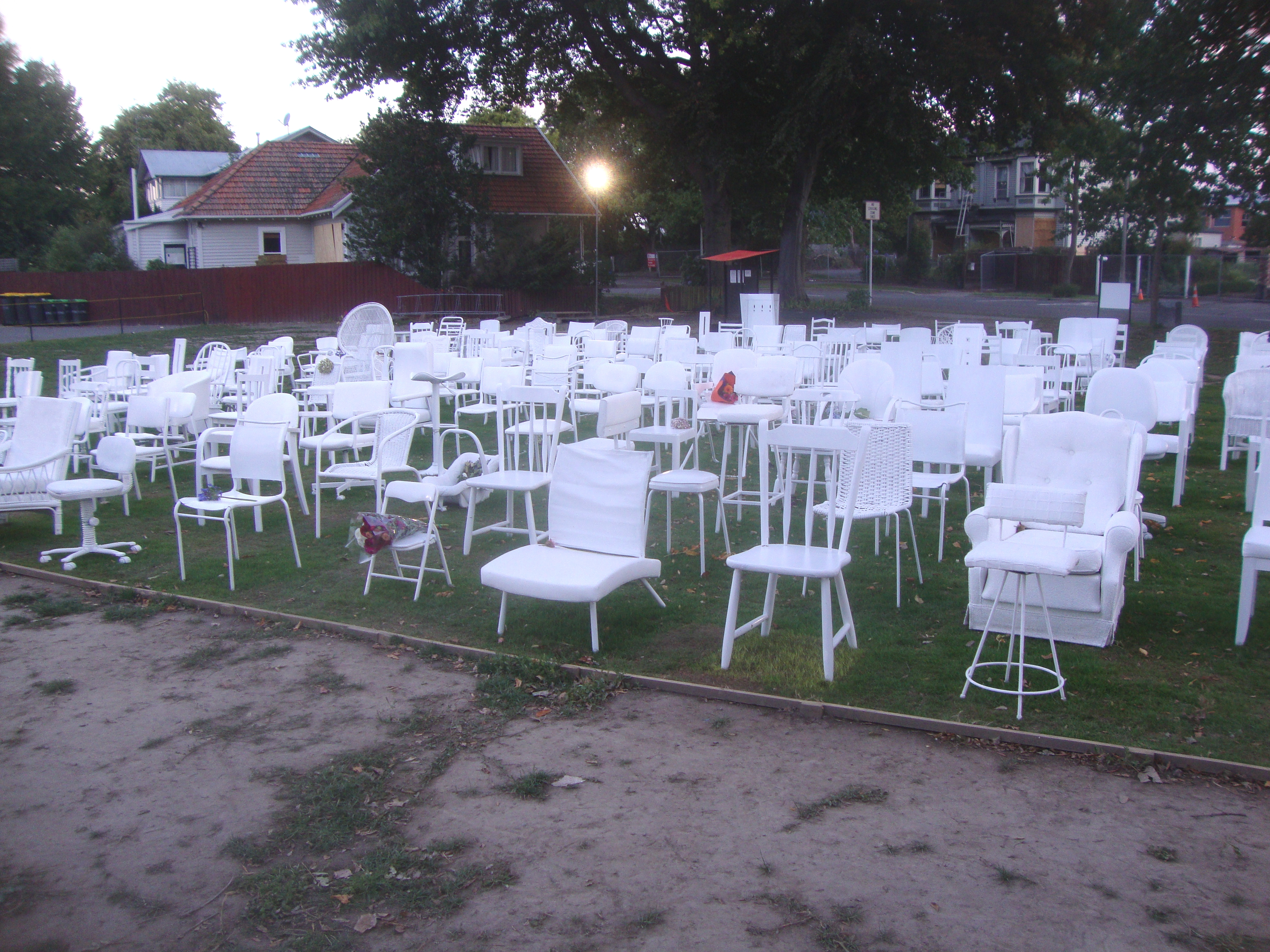
185 empty chairs as installed in February 2012

A place where people can spend time in reflection and honour those who lost their lives or were injured in the earthquakes will be developed in central Christchurch. The national Earthquake Memorial will be a place of local, national and international significance where individuals can reflect and large groups can gather. Because this is such a significant project, it should begin early, not be rushed and involve the community and families of those who died.

— Canterbury Earthquake Recovery Authority,

At the time the Blueprint was released, an informal earthquake memorial, 185 empty chairs, had already been created by local artist Peter Majendie. However, it was expected that it was to be an installation for the short term only.

=== Site for the memorial ===
The site for the official memorial, both sides of the Avon River downstream from where Montreal Street crosses the river, was revealed in July 2014 as part of the design brief. The following site description was given as part of the brief: (Note: Copy-edited for clarity, and to show converted units.)

The site for the memorial is on a stretch of Ōtākaro / Avon River, between the Montreal Street bridge and Rhododendron Island. As part of the development of Avon River Precinct, Oxford Terrace (to the south of the river) will be reduced in scale and become a shared street where pedestrians have priority. This means the river bank can be contoured on this side, as part of the design of the memorial. This bank is sunny and sheltered, and has an amphitheatre form. The opposite river bank is relatively flat, large and open. The overall area of the site is about 9,800 square metres (105,000 sq ft). The main riverside parkland area is about 60 by 30 metres (197 ft × 98 ft). For large events, a crowd of around 2,000 could fit on the site. If roads were closed around the site, this number could be increased considerably. The site connects to the inner city via a pathway through mature plane trees, leading towards the Bridge of Remembrance, and to the west along Ōtakaro / Avon River to the Botanic Gardens and Hagley Park.

— Canterbury Earthquake Recovery Authority,

=== Design competition ===
The objectives for the memorial were for a design that:

- Honours the 185 people who lost their lives, as well as those who were injured in the Canterbury earthquakes
- Remembers and gives thanks to the many organisations from around the country and around the world that assisted in the rescue and recovery
- Recognises the shared human experiences of those involved in the events, and the effects of the earthquakes on the city and Canterbury including the loss of many treasured heritage buildings, as well as the familiar everyday cityscape
- Provides a space for hosting formal civic events, such as an annual memorial gathering on 22 February
- Allows for reflection and contemplation on a day-to-day basis, including for small groups or individuals
- Becomes the anchor point for remembering in the city and Canterbury and part of the wider context of the impact of the earthquakes

Parties interested in the competition had to register with the Christchurch Central Development Unit (CCDU) to obtain a registration number, which had to be shown on all submitted material as an identifier. Company logos or other branding were not allowed, ensuring that the evaluation panel would not be biased. The invitation to submit designs drew 330 responses from 37 countries. Of these, six were short-listed and in October 2014, people injured and families of those who died were asked for feedback. On 10 December 2014, CERA informed the public via a press release that six designs had been short-listed and that the finalists had been asked to further develop their designs. At that time, the intention of having the memorial finished in 2016 was reiterated. A week later, the designs were leaked to The Press, with the local newspaper publishing the preliminary design plans on 18 December 2014. The official release of the short-list with finalised plans happened on 17 February 2015, just before the fourth anniversary of the earthquake, when Nicky Wagner in her role as Associate Earthquake Recovery Minister presented them to the public. At the release, Wagner expressed the hope that the memorial "would be at least partially built" by the 2016 anniversary, indicating that the original time line would not be met.

=== Construction ===
As part of the work, part of Oxford Terrace will be turned into a pedestrian precinct; prior to the earthquake, it was part of the central city's one-way system. Construction of the memorial started with a groundbreaking ceremony by the Prime Minister – John Key, Earthquake Recovery Minister – Gerry Brownlee, Mayor of Christchurch – Lianne Dalziel, and Ngāi Tahu chairperson – Mark Solomon, on 12 November 2015. During rain in May 2016, the construction site flooded and a spokesman stated: "It will flood occasionally and it is designed to cope with this."

The memorial was opened on 22 February 2017. The costs of the memorial were reported to be NZ$11m, with $10m from the government, and $1m from the Christchurch Earthquake Mayoral Relief Fund.

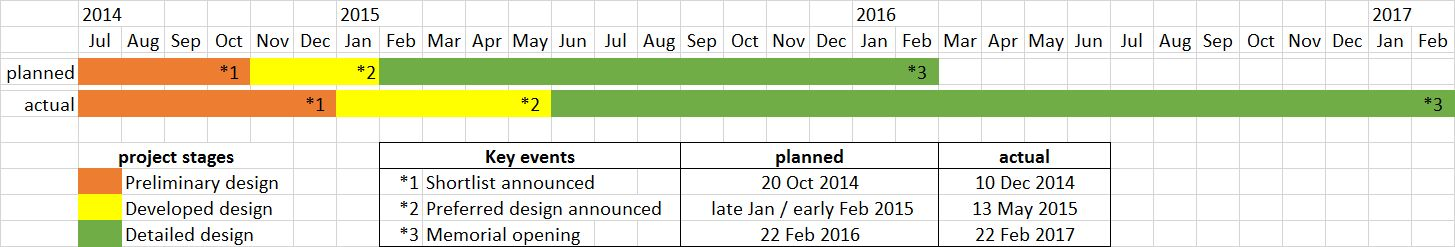
Project development time line

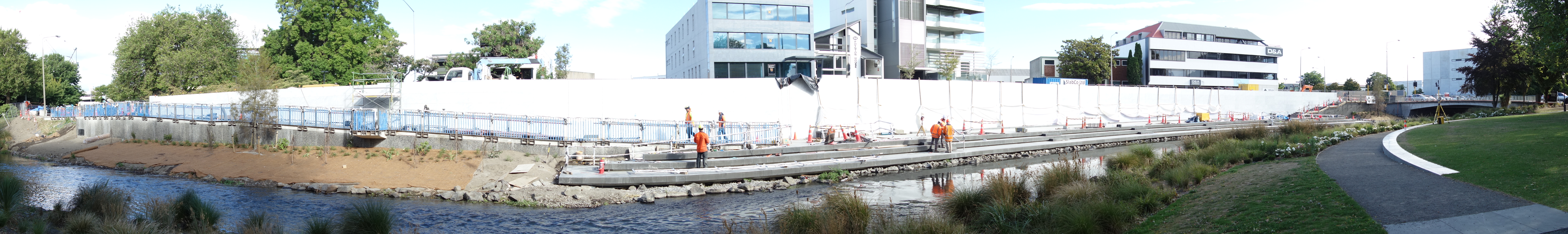
Canterbury Earthquake National Memorial under construction two weeks before its opening

== Status ==
As of 2023, the government has registered the memorial as one of its 21 National Memorials. It is administered by the Ministry for Culture and Heritage.

== Memorial services ==
Each year at 12:51 pm at 22 February, the anniversaries of the 2011 earthquake, a minute of silence is held. Afterwards the names of all the 185 people who died in the earthquake are read out, with the bell of HMNZS Canterbury being tolled for each name. A wreath is then laid at the memorial and when the ceremony ends, members of the public are encouraged to lay floral tributes.

== See also ==
- Memorials and services for the Canterbury earthquakes
