= 185 empty chairs =

Memorial in Christchurch, New Zealand

Coordinates: 43°32′00″S 172°38′35″E

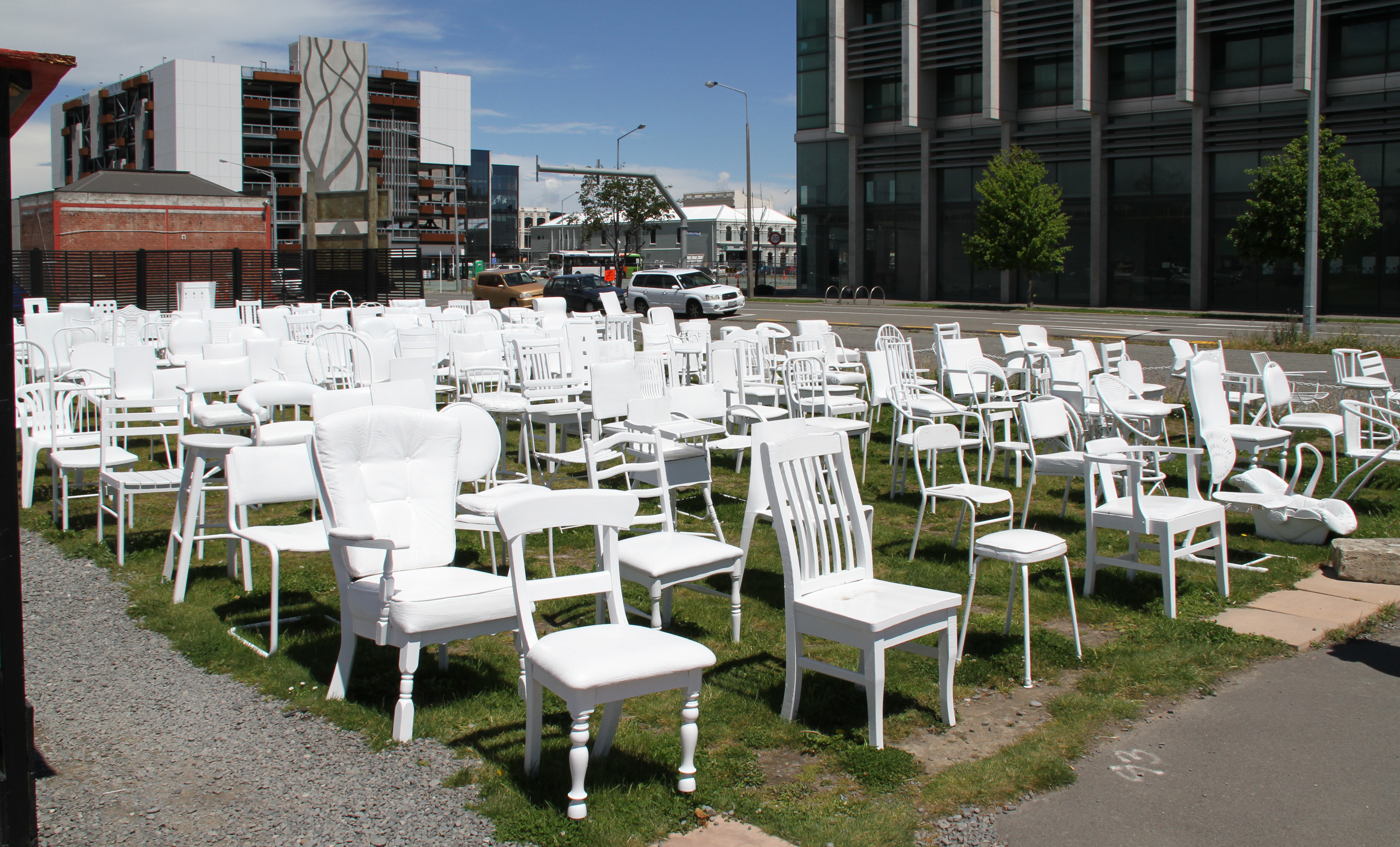
185 empty chairs in 2016

185 empty chairs, also known as 185 white chairs or 185 empty white chairs or simply as 185 chairs, was an unofficial memorial for the 185 individuals who died in the 2011 Christchurch earthquake. Envisaged as a short-term installation made from chairs painted white, it became a major tourist attraction in Christchurch, New Zealand. Installed at the day of the earthquake's first anniversary, it preceded the official earthquake memorial—the Canterbury Earthquake National Memorial—by five years. As of 2017, there was a desire to turn the temporary installation into a permanent fixture. The memorial was closed and the chairs dispersed in April 2023.

== History ==
Christchurch was struck by an earthquake on 22 February 2011 that killed 185 people. On the day of the earthquake's first anniversary, local artist Peter Majendie arranged 185 empty chairs that he had painted white on the site of the demolished Oxford Terrace Baptist Church. The day after the installation, the local newspaper The Press reported that the artist's intention was for the memorial to stay for a week. The artist himself said later that he thought the chairs should stay for three weeks.

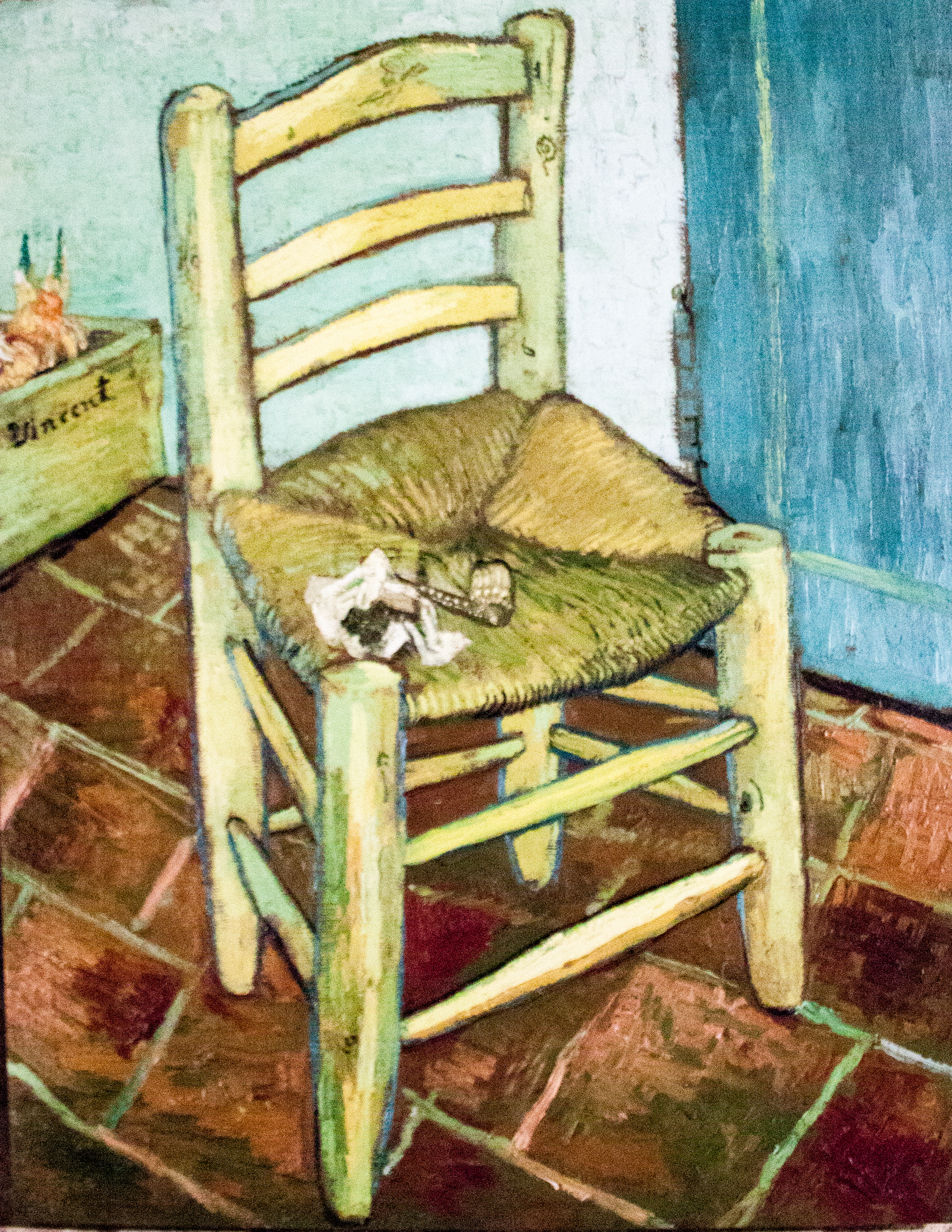
Vincent's Chair with his Pipe

Majendie's main inspiration for the installation came from paintings by Vincent van Gogh of empty chairs, representing their owners' different personalities. When he created his artwork, Majendie was aware of the Field of Empty Chairs as part of the Oklahoma City National Memorial, and the chairs in New York's Bryant Park.

In October 2012, the installation moved a few hundred metres south to the site of the demolished St Paul's Church, as building activity was to start at the Baptist Church site. This second site is diagonally opposite the CTV Building site where 115 people died. It was then moved to the old St Luke's Anglican Church site on the corner of Kilmore and Manchester streets in 2021.

When the winning design for the Canterbury Earthquake National Memorial was announced in May 2015, Majendie started considering the future of his temporary installation. He pondered the idea of having the chairs made into a permanent fixture. In January 2017, Majendie firmed up on the idea and proposed to turn the temporary installation into a permanent one by casting chairs in aluminium and having them powder-coated white. It was also necessary to find a new site, as the St Paul's Church site was designated by the government for the proposed Christchurch Stadium. Majendie favoured the CTV site for the installation. The placement at the CTV site was rejected by some of the relatives of the victims.

The official earthquake memorial was unveiled on 22 February 2017, six years after the earthquake causing the 185 deaths, and five years after Majendie installed his installation.

On 1 April 2023, the exhibition was closed when the artist invited people to take a chair home to disperse them around the city.

== Reception ==
In 2017 the American travel website TripAdvisor listed 185 empty chairs as the city's top landmark attraction (ahead of the Christchurch Gondola and the Cardboard Cathedral), and put it in fourth place across New Zealand.

== See also ==
- Memorials and services for the Canterbury earthquakes
