= Canterbury Earthquake Commemoration Day Act 2011 =

Act of Parliament in New Zealand

Canterbury Earthquake Commemoration Day Act

New Zealand Parliament
- Royal assent: 14 March 2011
- Commenced: 15 March 2011

Legislative history
- Introduced by: Hon Kate Wilkinson
- Passed: 10 March 2011
- Status: Expired

The Canterbury Earthquake Commemoration Day Act 2011 is an Act of Parliament passed into law in New Zealand in 2011. It created a one-off public holiday in parts of Canterbury to commemorate the effects of the Canterbury earthquakes, starting with the first shock on 4 September 2010, but in particular the aftershock on 22 February 2011 that killed 185 people.

== Bill history ==
The bill was introduced by Hon Kate Wilkinson as Minister of Labour on behalf of the government, and it had all three readings on 10 March 2011; just over two weeks since the earthquake that caused the government to draft the bill. Members who gave speeches in the first reading were Kate Wilkinson (National), Annette King (Labour), Judith Collins (National), Trevor Mallard (Labour), Keith Locke (Greens), Te Ururoa Flavell (Māori), Jo Goodhew (National), Darien Fenton (Labour), Tau Henare (National), Charles Chauvel (Labour), and David Bennett (National). Members who gave speeches in the second reading were Wilkinson, Mallard, Allan Peachey (National), Maryan Street (Labour), Locke, Michael Woodhouse (National), Fenton, Nikki Kaye (National), Chauvel, and Colin King (National). Members who gave speeches in the third reading were Wilkinson, Mallard, Hekia Parata (National), Locke, and Flavell. Parliament passed the bill unanimously.

== Impact ==
The public holiday, set for 18 March 2011, was "to be observed in those parts of Canterbury that observe Christchurch Show Day as Canterbury Anniversary Day for the purposes of the Holidays Act 2003". The rationale for such a complicated definition is that South Canterbury observes its provincial holiday on a different day (Dominion Day) and as it was not significantly affected by the earthquake, the public holiday was not to apply there. There was discussion whether Kaikōura should join in with the celebrations or not. The town had originally belonged to Marlborough Province and for this historic reason, it observes the Marlborough Anniversary Day. Following boundary adjustments in 1992, Kaikōura is located within the area covered by the Canterbury Regional Council, and many residents feel a stronger connection to Christchurch than to Blenheim, the main city in Marlborough. The Kaikōura District Council discussed the situation and confirmed that, in accordance with the legislation, the public holiday would not apply in their town.

== Commemoration day ==
18 March 2011, a Friday, was set for the commemoration. Schools and offices were closed, and the formal event was held in North Hagley Park. Overseas dignitaries at the event included Prince William (who represented the Queen), Julia Gillard (Prime Minister of Australia), Tony Abbott (Leader of the Opposition in Australia), and Quentin Bryce (Governor-General of Australia).

== Expiry ==
The act expired at the end of 18 March 2011, the date of the commemoration.

== See also ==
- Memorials and services for the Canterbury earthquakes
