= Medway Street footbridge =

Bridge in Christchurch, New Zealand

- Coordinates: 43°30′56″S 172°39′56″E
- Crosses: Avon River / Ōtākaro
- Locale: Christchurch, New Zealand

Location
- Interactive map of Medway Street footbridge

The Medway Street footbridge crosses the Avon River / Ōtākaro, connecting the Christchurch, New Zealand, suburbs of Richmond and Avonside. The original bridge became twisted in the 2010 Canterbury earthquake, leading to its removal in 2013. Part of the structure was placed on the river bank in October 2018 to serve as a memorial. In 2022, a new bridge was opened just to the south of the old bridge.

== Old bridge ==
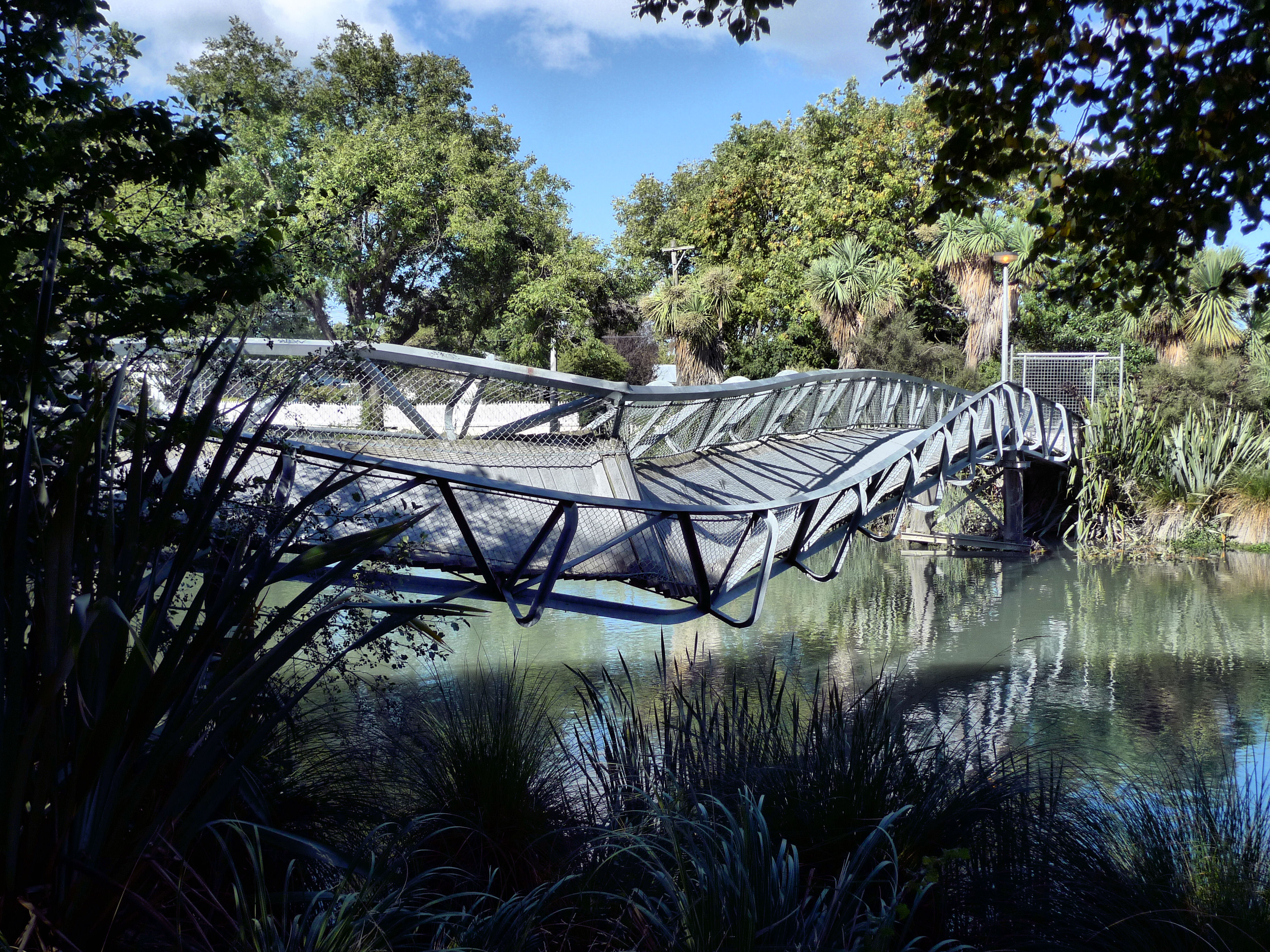
Bridge in March 2011

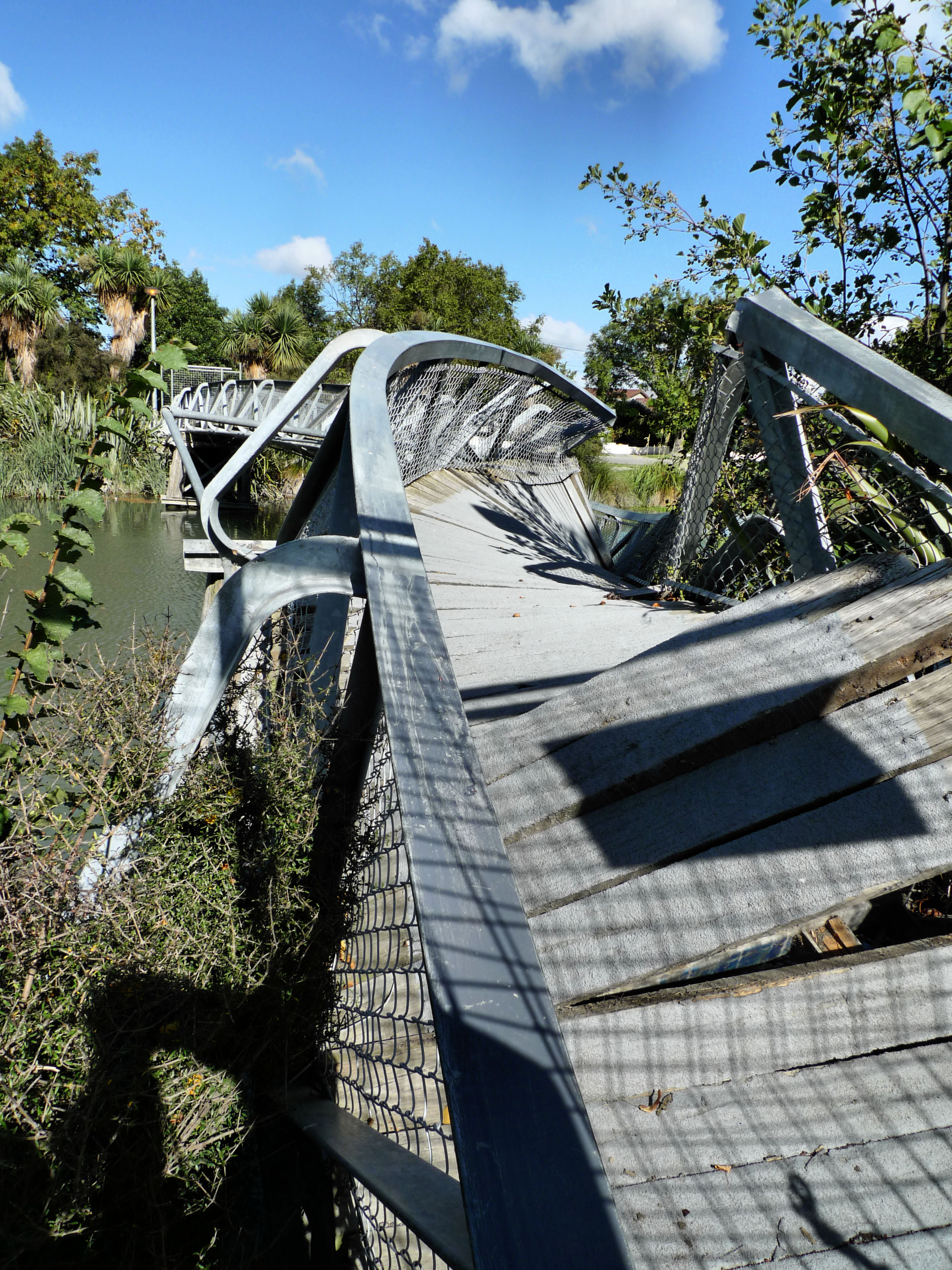
Bridge in March 2011

The September 2010 Canterbury earthquake caused the bridge to become twisted and unsafe. In April 2013, it was lifted by crane and cut into three pieces, and put in storage at Ferrymead Heritage Park, before a place could be found where it could serve as an earthquake memorial. In 2017, part of it was used in a temporary golf course using parts of earthquake-damaged heritage structures. The course was made by Gap Filler and Serious Fun Partnership. There was some controversy over this use, with locals suggesting that there may have been a better way to tell the bridge's story, as it was seen as an earthquake icon. They were also concerned that the council had not consulted them on the matter. The mini golf course closed in 2023 and the bridge section was returned to the Christchurch City Council.

In October 2018, a different section of the bridge was placed on the river bank to serve as a memorial. There are signs on both sides of the river providing information about the former bridge.

== Current bridge ==
In November 2020, the Christchurch City Council approved the construction of three new bridges in the area, which had become a part of the residential red zone. One of these bridges included a replacement Medway Street footbridge, which is made of steel, 45 metres (148 ft) long and 4.5 metres (15 ft) high. The colours of the three bridges were changed from their original designs after public consultation. The new bridges cost an estimated $11.5 million, paid by the Christchurch Earthquake Appeal Trust. The Medway bridge was opened in May 2022.
