= PGC Building =

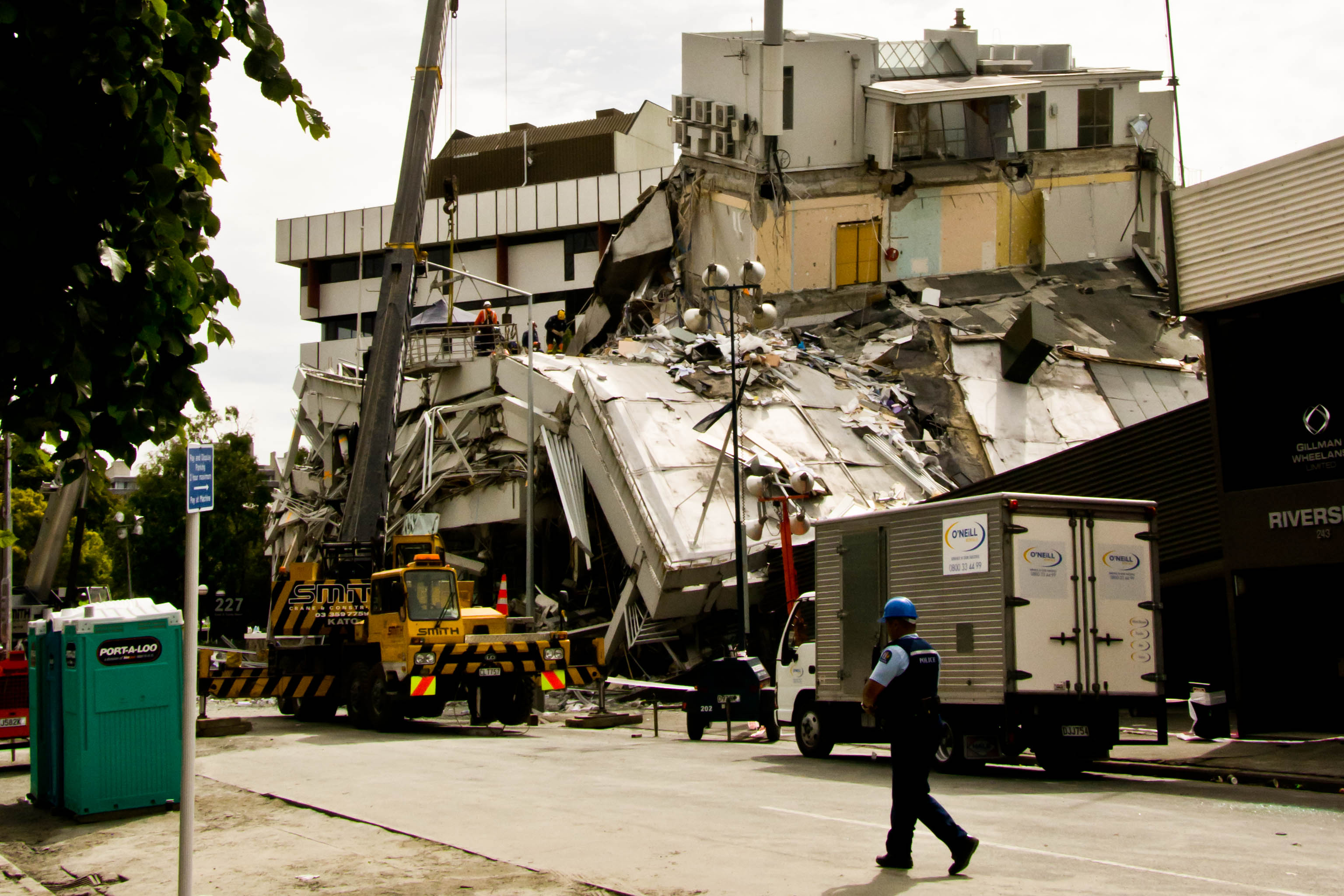
- The PGC Building on 24 February 2011
- Alternative names: Pyne Gould Corporation building, PGC House

General information
- Status: Destroyed
- Type: Commercial
- Architectural style: Postmodern
- Location: Christchurch Central, New Zealand, 233 Cambridge Terrace, Christchurch
- Coordinates: 43°31′39.08″S 172°38′19.43″E
- Year built: 1964–1966
- Renovated: 1997–1998
- Destroyed: 22 February 2011
- Owner: Stephen Collins

Design and construction
- Architecture firm: Paul Pascoe & Linton Architects
- Structural engineer: I.L. Holmes Structural Engineers

Renovating team
- Architect: Warren and Mahoney
- Structural engineer: Holmes Consulting Group
- Main contractor: William Fox

The PGC Building (also known as the Pyne Gould Corporation building or PGC House) was a five-storey postmodern office building in Christchurch, New Zealand. It became infamously associated with the 2011 Christchurch earthquake, with images of the failed structure and stories of trapped survivors having been widely broadcast. Eighteen people were killed in the building during the earthquake, and many more were injured, in what was described as a "catastrophic collapse." It was the second most deadly incident in the earthquake after the CTV Building collapse.

Built in the mid-1960s, it was originally used as an office space for the Christchurch Drainage Board. Ownership was transferred to Pyne Gould Corporation in 1997. Over the next decade, the company undertook several projects to renovate the building and also explored options to structurally strengthen it.

In 2011 at the time of its collapse, the PGC Building was home to several related companies: PGC, Marac Finance, Perpetual Trust, Leech and Partners, and Marsh Insurance, which operated across different levels. The building had been declared safe to open after four assessments following the 2010 Canterbury earthquake and subsequent aftershocks, but some staff in the building raised concerns after noticing cracks appearing in columns.

A Royal Commission report found that the ductility of the building was poor and the design could not have legally been built according to 2011 building code standards. At the time it was designed, ductile detailing processes had not been introduced as standard. Consequently, the PGC Building was earthquake-prone by modern standards.

Despite structural performance having been investigated during the renovation in the late 90s, the standards of the time did not flag the PGC Building as being at risk, and subsequent renovations were considered to be of good standard. After earthquake performance standards were changed in the 2000s, Holmes Consulting Group performed a full seismic assessment in 2007 on the structure and deemed it would perform "reasonably well" in a report that was accepted by the Christchurch City Council. Other structural assessments also did not find the building posed a risk.

The commission concluded that the main factor in the failure of the building was the intense force in the east–west direction of the building overwhelming the structure, which met less than 40% of the building code in 2011.

== Construction and renovations ==
The PGC Building was designed in 1963 by Paul Pascoe & Linton Architects. Applications for a building permit were lodged the follow year, with construction taking place in March 1964 and completing in 1966.

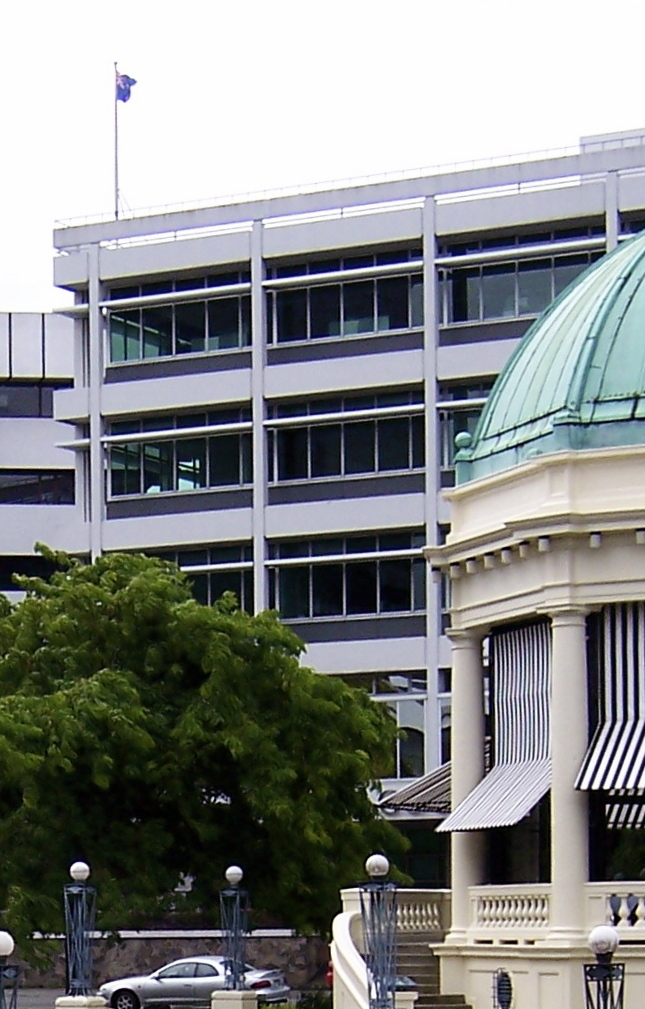
PGC Building in 2008 shortly after additional renovations

The building was originally constructed as an administrative office for what was then the Christchurch Drainage Board. After the department was dissolved in 1989, various options were explored for the future of the building, including a sale that fell through in 1993 after a disagreement about who should be liable for a structural analysis.

In 1997, Christchurch City Council transferred the property to Pyne Gould Corporation. Over the next two years, following a report by Holmes Consulting Group, the company was given consent approval to modify the facade and renovate offices on level four. The company was also considering structural strengthening work as part of its plans. A predecessor of Holmes had been involved in the design of the building, and some of the original structural drawings and calculations had been retained; in the 1997 report, Holmes advised that bringing the building fully to code was not legally required.

A renovation project to address some of the concerns around the building proceeded under the direction of William Fox, Warren and Mahoney and Holmes Consulting Group, including the use of steel prop reinforcement; at the time, the work was considered in excess of the required new standards of the time.

From 2001 through to 2007, various alternations were made on the building, including a roof support beam, work on levels three and four, and a redesign of the ground floor, with further redesign options considered. In 2009, Pyne Gould Corporation transferred the property to a company named Cambridge 233 Limited. The building was owned by property developer Stephen Collins at the time of collapse, who had acquired it less than two years prior.

== Collapse and investigation ==
The PGC Building was rapidly assessed following the 2010 Canterbury earthquakes. From September through to January 2011, the building was assessed four times by Holmes. It was subsequently reopened after various reports into the building, including by engineering firm Beca, found it suffered minor damage but did not pose immediate risk. Some of those in the building allegedly raised concern after noticing cracks appearing on columns.

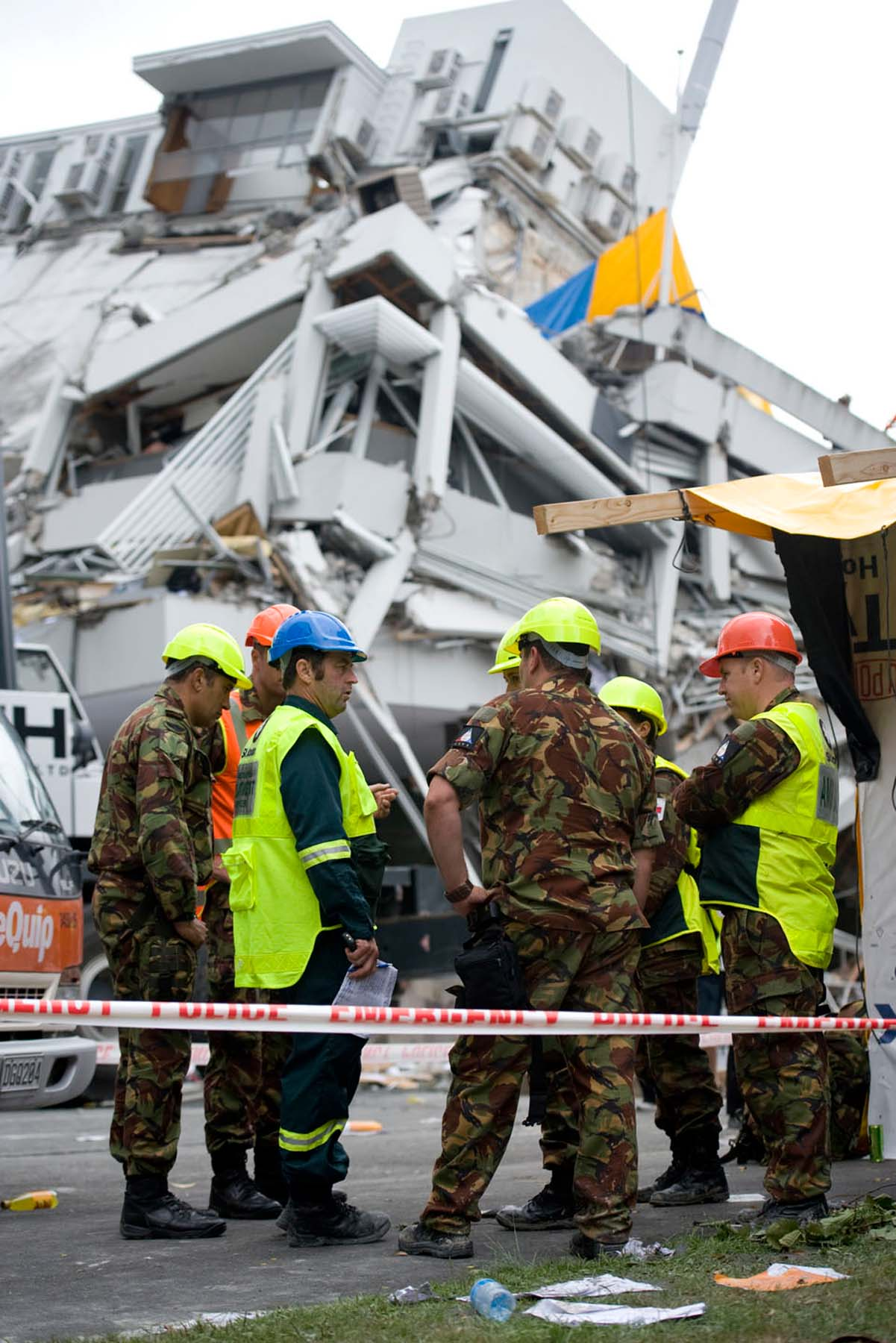
NZ Army medics provide support at the collapsed PGC Building, 24 February 2011

During the 2011 Christchurch earthquake the building collapsed in what was later described as a "severe failure" of the structure. A witness claimed the collapse happened within several seconds of the earthquake starting, and pancaked in the style of a controlled demolition.

The collapse killed eighteen people and trapped and injured a number of others, some severely. Due to the urgency of the situation and ongoing aftershocks, at least one hacksaw amputation was performed on site to free a victim. Some survivors of the collapse waited several hours in the rubble before they were rescued. Some of the victims' families gathered outside overnight; the last survivor was freed 26 hours after the collapse.

A number of specialists were brought in to help with the rescue effort, including the New Zealand Army and Australian Urban Search Rescue.

=== Royal Commission findings ===
A Royal Commission investigation into the building noted that the building had several "critical structural issues" including poorer seismic resistance on the upper floors compared to the ground floor and a lack of ductility in the structure which predated ductile detailing used in modern design. By modern standards, the building would have been illegal to construct in 2011.

Both the engineers who assessed the building before its collapse, and the Harcourts property manager, defended their decisions and processes after being scrutinised for putting the victims at risk.

The collapse was determined to have started by the failure of reinforced concrete core walls in the eastern and western area of the building on the first two levels, with the failure of the west section causing catastrophic vertical compression and increased horizontal deflections on the eastern walls. On some floors, the connections between the shear core and the floor slabs failed, causing the pancake effect seen by witnesses. The ground floor stayed relatively intact due to its stronger seismic strength compared to the upper floors.

In the final report, the commission concluded that the 2010 Canterbury earthquake did not significantly weaken the building, and that neither liquefaction nor foundation instability were a factor. Rather, the intense force in the east–west direction was several times stronger than the building could withstand, and the building was not up to code for new building standards.

== Legacy ==
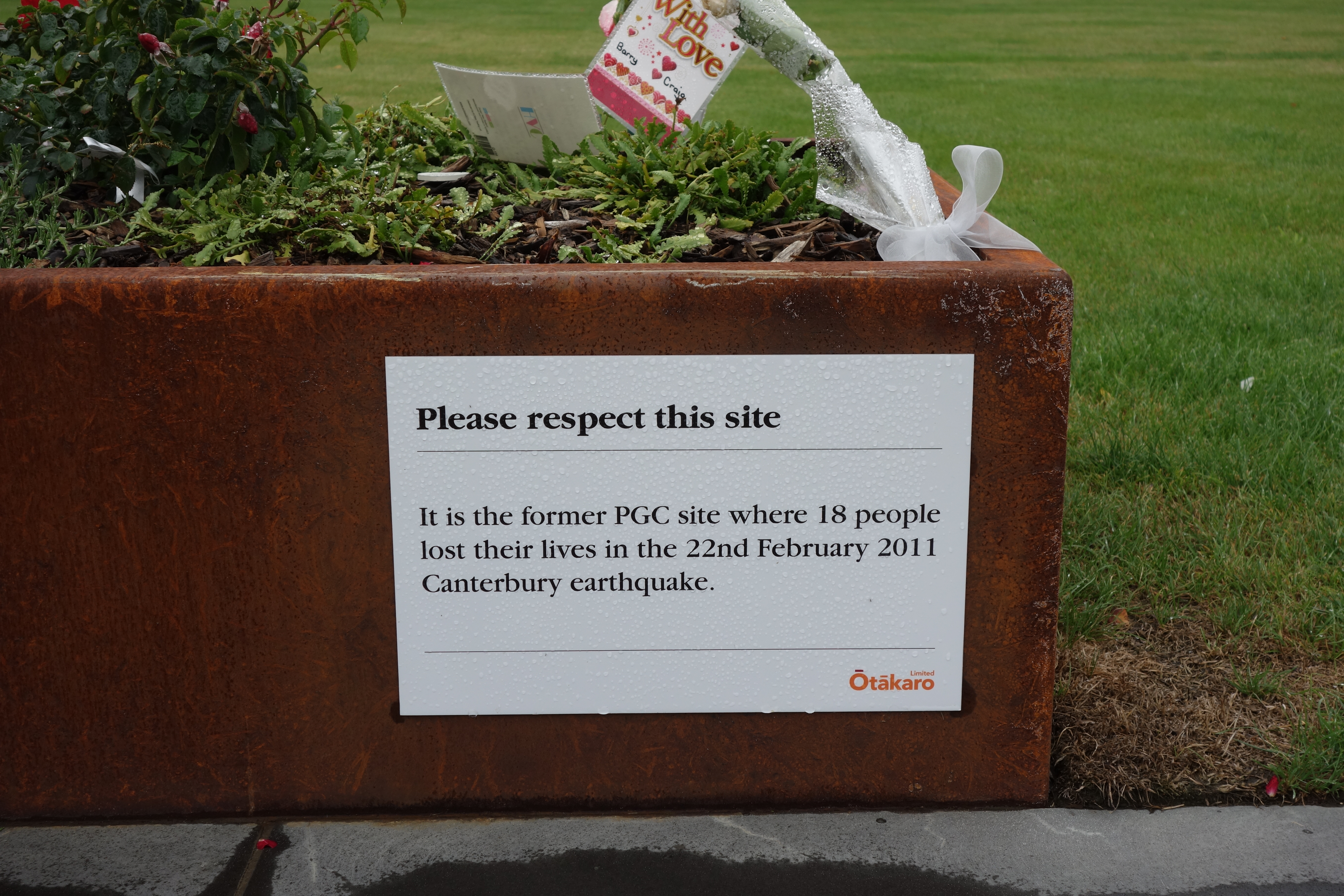
A memorial sign in the former PGC building site

The visual image of the collapsed PGC Building remains closely linked to the 2011 Christchurch earthquake. As the second most deadly incident in the earthquake, the PGC Building and the memories of the victims are a notable part of anniversary memorials.

The PGC building was demolished soon after the earthquake in February 2011. The site was purchased by The Crown and turned into a park with benches, a lawn, and a commemorative plaque requesting that visitors respect the site.
