= List of tallest buildings in Christchurch =

Tall buildings in Christchurch
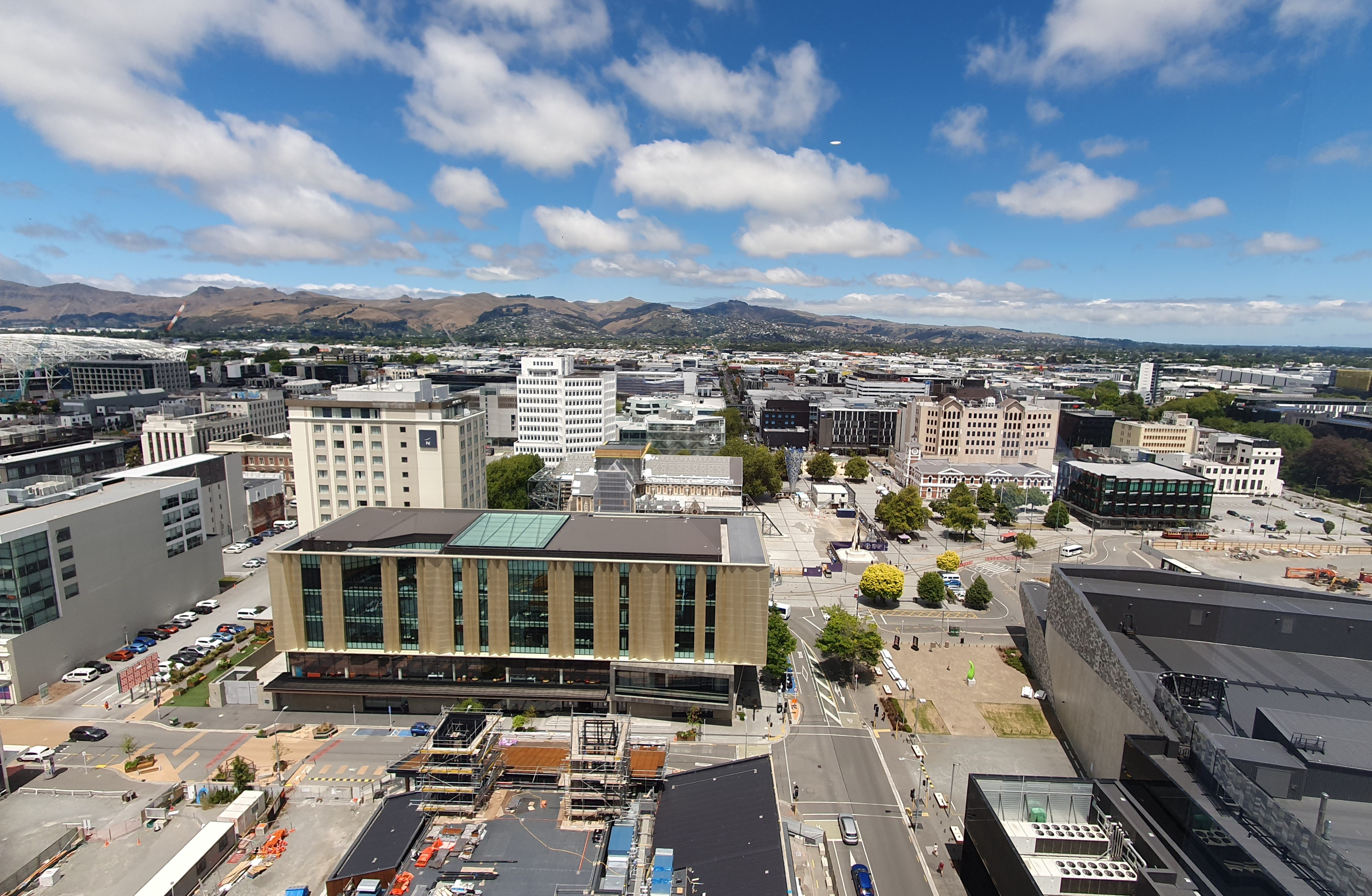
- Central Christchurch in 2025
- Tallest building: Pacific Tower
- Tallest building height: 86.5 m (284 ft)

Number of tall buildings
- 10 stories or more: 14 (2025)
- 20 stories or more: 1 (2025)

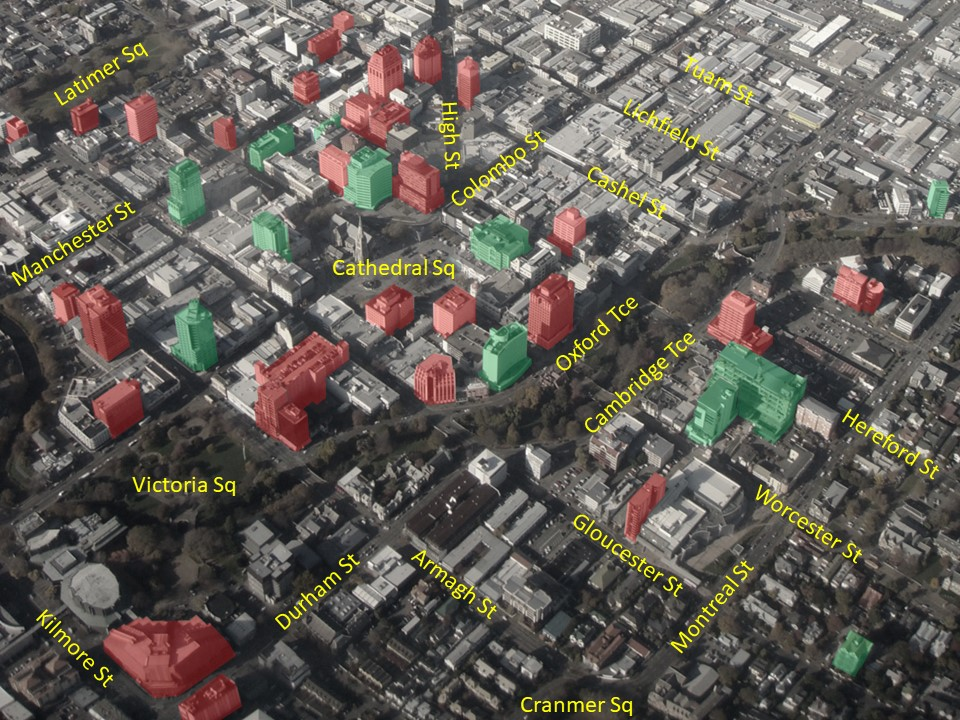
43 of the 54 Christchurch high-rises colour-coded as per the list below, with their status shown as of August 2024

This list of tallest buildings in Christchurch ranks high-rise buildings in Christchurch, New Zealand, by height.

Although New Zealand's second-largest city, Christchurch is predominantly low-rise. The current tallest building is the Pacific Tower, which was completed in 2010 and rises to 86.5 metres (284 ft). It is the seventh building to have held this title.

Many high-rise buildings were demolished following the February 2011 Christchurch earthquake, making it the single worst event for high rise destruction in history.

Of the 54 buildings standing at least 35 metres (115 ft) before the earthquakes only 18 remain, with the remainder having been demolished.

== Background ==
=== 1900–1979 ===
Manchester Courts, earlier known as the MLC Building, was the city's first commercial high-rise building. Built in 1905–1906 for the New Zealand Express Company, it was at the time the tallest commercial building in Christchurch. A Category I heritage building since 1991, it suffered serious structural damage in the 2010 Canterbury earthquake and was condemned to be demolished. Demolition began on 19 October 2010, and was completed in February 2011.

The BNZ Building in Cathedral Square has one of the oldest histories of the buildings listed here, as it replaced the earlier BNZ Building from 1866. The replacement was begun in 1961 as a four-storey building designed by Christchurch architect G. W. Bucknell. Work ceased abruptly in 1963, when the bank announced that they would redevelop the whole site (which included the removal of the historic bank building) and incorporate the four-storey building into the high-rise. The 51 metres (167 ft) high-rise was designed by Sydney firm Stephenson and Turner and completed in 1967.

=== 1980–1999 ===
Throughout the 1980s Christchurch saw a high-rise boom, with some of the cities tallest, and most recognisable, buildings constructed during this period. Notable structures include:

Hotel Grand Chancellor, was completed in 1986, and at the time held the title of tallest building. Rising to 85 metres (279 ft), the 26-storey hotel suffered critical structural failure following the 2011 earthquakes and was subsequently demolished shortly after.

Clarendon Tower, designed by Warren and Mahoney, was constructed during 1986/87 on the site of the former Clarendon Hotel. It retained most of the historic hotel's façade, which was the first example of facadism in Christchurch. The 17-storey structure failed in the February 2011 earthquake, with the internal staircases collapsing and the building 'ballooning' in the middle by some 100 millimetres (3.9 in).

Forsyth Barr Building (now Crowne Plaza Hotel) is one of only two high-rise structure of those constructed throughout this period which still remain. The 19-storey tower is now the second-tallest building in Christchurch. After suffering staircase collapse in the earthquakes, The building was sold "as is where is" in August 2014 to a local consortium who have since repaired and converted it into a hotel.

Radio Network House, a 14-storey building in Worcester Street was completed in 1986. Following the earthquakes it was imploded on 5 August 2012 and was New Zealand's first ever controlled building demolition by explosives.

Also constructed during this time were the Westpac Canterbury Centre, PricewaterhouseCoopers centre, and the Centra Building.

=== 2000–2010 ===
The 2000s saw continued high-rise development across the city, with many buildings having been constructed during this time still remaining. Notable structures include:

Pacific Tower, rising 86.5 metres (284 ft), is the city's tallest building. Following the earthquakes, it was repaired and reopened on 1 May 2013 and currently houses the Fable Hotel.

Club Tower, designed by Weirwalker Architecture in Worcester Boulevard, which first opened in 2009. This was the first high-rise to open again after the February 2011 earthquake, with the first tenants moving back in on 30 May 2011. The Canterbury Earthquake Recovery Authority later moved into the top floors of the building, with CEO Roger Sutton's office the "highest office in town".

Novotel Hotel at Cathedral Square was completed in 2010. Rising 15-storeys, it was repaired following the earthquakes and reopened on 19 August 2013.

Also constructed during this time were the Gallery Apartments, Victoria Square Tower, and Oxford Apartments.

=== 2011–present ===
High-rise construction following the 2010/2011 earthquakes has largely been blocked due to height-limits imposed by the Christchurch City Council. Buildings were restricted to 28 metres (92 ft), unless a structure which exceeded this height had previously stood on the site.

In the decade following 2011, only two buildings standing above 35 metres (115 ft) have been constructed, with a further three currently under construction.

In September 2024, Council voted to remove height restrictions within certain areas of the CBD, and loosened requirements surrounding the need for developers to apply for resource consent. This was in response to the central governments push for the development of intensive housing.

As of September 2024, there are currently two active proposals to develop buildings standing taller than 35 metres (115 ft) and numerous more which, while inactive, have yet to be officially cancelled.

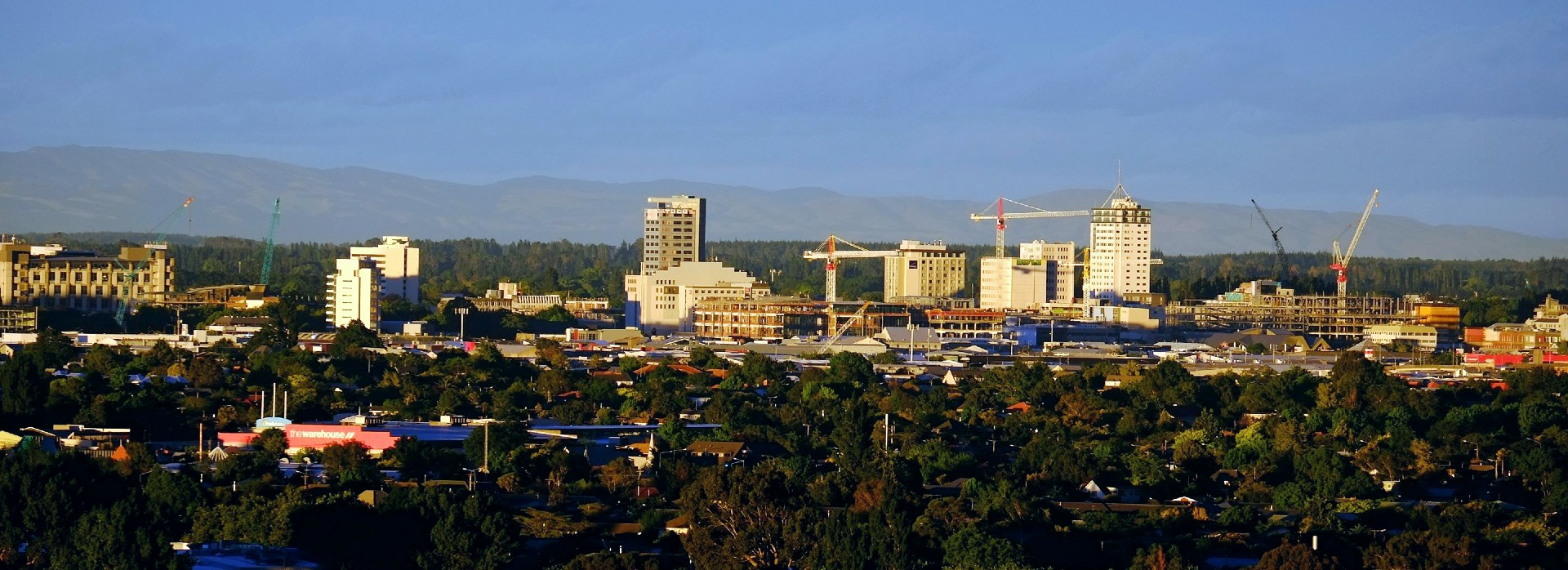
Central city seen from the Port Hills in December 2015 looking north, with most of the earthquake-damaged tall buildings demolished; the Civic Offices in Hereford Street are on the far left

== Lists ==
=== Tallest buildings ===
This lists ranks Christchurch high-rises that stand at least 35 metres (115 ft) tall, based on standard height measurement. This includes spires, architectural details, and antenna masts.

Colour key

Building constructed prior to the earthquakes
Building yet to be repaired
Building constructed following the earthquakes
Building under construction

Rank	Name	Height m (feet)	Floors	Year	Purpose	Architect	Builder	Notes	Refs
1	Pacific Tower, 166 Gloucester St	86.5 (284)	23	2010	Hotel & Apartments	Rob Campbell	AMC Construction	Reopened 1 May 2013	
2	Crowne Plaza Hotel (former Forsyth Barr Building), 764 Colombo St	71 (233)	19	1989	Hotel	Warren and Mahoney	Paynter Construction	Reopened 1 July 2017 as Crowne Plaza Hotel	
3	Sheraton Hotel (former Noah's), 170 Oxford Tce	60 (200)	15	1975	Hotel	Donald Crone & Associates	Fletcher Construction	Undergoing repairs.	
4	Distinction Hotel (formerly the Millennium Christchurch), 14 Cathedral Sq	55.5 (182)	14	1974	Hotel	Hank Henning	Fletcher Construction	Reopened 6 March 2018	
5	Novotel Hotel, 50 Cathedral Sq	53.5 (176)	15	2010	Hotel	Dalman Architecture	Fletcher Construction	Reopened 19 August 2013	
6	Puaka–James Hight Building, University of Canterbury, 20 Kirkwood Ave	53 (174)	11	1974	Library & Office	Ministry of Works	CS Luney Construction	Reopened 2013	
7=	Waipapa Tower 1 & 2, Christchurch Hospital, 2 Riccarton Ave	50 (160)	10	2018	Hospital	Chow:Hill, Warren and Mahoney, Thinc Health	Schick Construction for earthworks and CPD Construction for tower	Tallest building completed since the earthquakes	
7=	Waipapa Tower 3, Christchurch Hospital, 2 Riccarton Ave	50 (160)	10	2026	Hospital	Chow:Hill, Warren and Mahoney, Thinc Health	Naylor Love	Scheduled for completion third quarter 2025	
9	One New Zealand Stadium, 218 Madras St	48 (157)	n/a	2026	Stadium	Warren and Mahoney	BESIX Watpac	Opened 27 March 2026	
10	Club Tower, 62 Worcester Blvd	45.5 (149)	12	2010	Office	Weirwalker Architecture	Hawkins Construction	Reopened 30 May 2011	
11=	Christchurch Civic Offices (former Post Centre), 53 Hereford St	45 (148)	8	1981	Office	Athfield Architects	Hawkins Construction	Reopened October 2011	
11=	University of Otago, Christchurch Medical School, 2 Riccarton Ave	45 (148)	12	1973	School	Ministry of Works	Fletcher Construction	Reopened 2013	
11=	Oxford Apartments, 66 Oxford Tce	45 (148)	12	2005	Residential	Warren and Mahoney	C. S. Luney Ltd	Repaired	
14	Huadu Innovation Hub (Former IRD Building)	42.5 (139)	8	2007	Office	Sumich Architects	C Lund and Son Construction	Repaired	
15	Telecom Building, 31 Cathedral Sq	42.4 (139)	12	1992	Office	Griffith Moffat and Partners	Hawkins Construction	Partially reopened	
16=	Wai-Ora, Otago University Building, 20 Oxford Tce	40 (130)	6	2026	University	Warren and Mahoney	Leighs Construction	Opened 18 September 2026	
16=	West Building, University of Canterbury, 20 Kirkwood Avenue	40 (130)	8	1965	University	Ministry of Works	Williamson Construction.	Open	
16=	161 Hereford Suites (former Harmony Towers), 161 Hereford St	40 (130)	10	1988	Hotel	Gabites Porter & Partners	Highcroft Properties	To be repaired	
19	Christchurch Women's Hospital	38 (125)	9	2005	Hospital	Chow Hill Architects Ltd	Hawkins Construction	Reopened	
20=	State Insurance Building, 116 Worcester St	36 (118)	10	1970	Office	Collins & Son	W. Williamson & Sons	To be repaired	
20=	The Gloucester, 28 Gloucester St	36 (118)	10	1991	Residential	Wilkie & Bruce	C. S. Luney Ltd	Open	
22	Christchurch Hospital, Riverside Block	35.5 (116)	8	1974	Hospital	Ministry of Works	Fletcher Construction	Reopened	

=== Under construction ===
This lists ranks under-construction Christchurch high-rises to stand at least 35 metres (115 ft) tall, based on standard height measurement. This includes spires, architectural details, and antenna masts.

Name	Height m (feet)	Floors	Year	Purpose	Architect	Notes	Refs
56 Worcester St	55	14	2028	Office	MAP Architects	Scheduled for completion 2028	
Waipapa Tower 3, Christchurch Hospital, 2 Riccarton Ave	58.8 (193)	10	2026	Hospital	Chow:Hill, Warren and Mahoney, Thinc Health	Scheduled for completion third quarter 2025	
38 Oxford Tce	?	8	2027	Student accommodation	Sheppard and Rout Architects	Scheduled for completion in 2027	

=== Tallest buildings before the February 2011 earthquake ===
This list ranks Christchurch high-rises that stand/stood at least 35 metres (115 ft) tall, based on standard height measurement. This includes spires, architectural details, and antenna masts.

Colour key

Building to remain after earthquakes
Building yet to be repaired
Building demolished since the earthquakes

Rank	Name	Height m (feet)	Floors	Year	Purpose	Architect	Builder	Notes	Refs
1	Pacific Tower, 166 Gloucester St	86.5 (284)	23	2010	Hotel & residential	Rob Campbell	AMC Construction	Reopened 1 May 2013	
2	Hotel Grand Chancellor, 161 Cashel St	85 (279)	20	1986	Hotel	Warren and Mahoney	Forbes Construction	Demolished 2012	
3	PricewaterhouseCoopers, 118 Armagh St	79 (259)	21	1990	Office	Wilkie & Bruce	Wilkins & Davies Construction	Demolished 2012	
4	Forsyth Barr Building, 764 Colombo St	71 (233)	19	1989	Office	Warren and Mahoney	Paynter Construction	Reopened 1 July 2017 as Crowne Plaza Hotel	
5	Clarendon Tower, 78 Worcester St	67.7 (222)	18	1988	Office	Warren and Mahoney	Paynter Construction	Demolished 2012	
6	Radio Network House, 155 Worcester St	61 (200)	14	1986	Office	Sheppard & Rout	Forbes Construction	Imploded on 5 August 2012	
7	Rydges Hotel (former Noah's), 170 Oxford Tce	60 (200)	15	1975	Hotel	Donald Crone & Associates	Fletcher Construction	To be repaired	
8	Centra Building (Holiday Inn), Cnr High and Cashel Sts	60 (200)	15	1989	Hotel	Peter Beaven	C. S. Luney Ltd	Demolished 2012	
9	Westpac Canterbury Centre, cnr High and Cashel Sts	55.1 (181)	14	1983	Office	Warren and Mahoney	C. S. Luney Ltd	Demolished 2012	
10	James Hight Building, University of Canterbury, 20 Kirkwood Ave	53 (174)	11	1974	Library	Ministry of Works	C. S. Luney Ltd	Reopened 2013	
11	Christchurch Central Police Station, 48 Hereford St	52 (171)	14	1973	Office	Ministry of Works architects	W. Williamsom & Sons	Imploded on 31 May 2015	
12	Victoria Square Tower (The Rutherford), 100 Armagh St	51.8 (170)	15	2006	Residential	Buchan Group	Hawkins Construction	Demolished 2014	
13	Novotel Hotel, 50 Cathedral Sq	51.6 (169)	15	2010	Hotel	Dalman Architecture	Fletcher Construction	Reopened 19 August 2013	
14	Heritage Hotel, 28–30 Cathedral Sq	51.6 (169)	12	1971	Hotel		Forbes Construction	Demolished 2013	
15	Millennium Christchurch, 14 Cathedral Sq	51.2 (168)	14	1974	Hotel	Hank Henning	Fletcher Construction	Reopened 6 March 2018 as Distinction Hotel	
16	BNZ Building, 129 Hereford St	51 (167)	12	1967	Office	Stephenson & Turner	P.D. Graham & Co.	Demolished 2017	
17	University of Otago, Christchurch Medical School, 2 Riccarton Ave	50 (160)	12	1973	School	Ministry of Works	Fletcher Construction	Reopened 2013	
18	Club Tower, 62 Worcester Blvd	45.2 (148)	12	2010	Office	Weirwalker Architecture	Hawkins Construction	Reopened 30 May 2011	
19	Crowne Plaza, cnr Kilmore and Durham Sts	45 (148)	12	1988	Hotel	Warren and Mahoney	Fletcher Construction	Demolished 2012	
20	Christchurch Civic Offices (former Postal Centre), 53 Hereford St	45 (148)	8	1981	Office	Athfield Architects	Hawkins Construction	Reopened October 2011	
21	Gallery Apartments, 62 Gloucester St	43.6 (143)	12	2007	Residential	Wilson & Hill	Hawkins Construction	Demolished 2012	
22	Anthony Harper House (former AMP Building), 47 Cathedral Sq	43.1 (141)	12	1975	Office	Donald Crone & Associates	C. S. Luney Ltd	Demolished 2012	
23	Telecom Building, 31 Cathedral Sq	42.4 (139)	12	1992	Office	Griffith Moffat and Partners	Hawkins Construction	Partially reopened	
25	NZI House, 92 Hereford St	40.9 (134)	12	1986	Office	Wilson & Hill	Paynter & Hamilton Ltd	Demolished 2012	
26	Tower Insurance (former Government Life Building), 69 Cathedral Sq	40.8 (134)	10	1963	Office	Collins & Son	C. S. Luney Ltd	Demolished 2014	
27	BNZ Building, 137 Armagh St	40.6 (133)	11	1985	Office	Trengrove and Blunt	C. S. Luney Ltd	Demolished 2013	
28	Avalon Apartments, 41 Cambridge Terrace	40 (130)	13	2003	Residential		Naylor Love	Demolished	
29	Oaks iStay Hotel, 187 Cashel St	40 (130)	12	2006	Hotel	Warren and Mahoney	Naylor Love Construction	Demolished 2015	
30	Bridgewater Apartments, 62 Cashel St	40 (130)	12	1997	Residential	Warren and Mahoney	Mainzeal Construction	Demolished	
31	West Building, University of Canterbury, 20 Kirkwood Avenue	40 (130)	8	1965	University	Ministry of Works	Williamson Construction.	Open	
32	Manchester Courts, 158–160 Manchester Street	39.6 (130)	12	1906	Office	Luttrell Brothers		Demolished 2010/11	
33	Te Waipounamu House (former Reserve Bank Building), 158 Hereford St	39.6 (130)	10	1964	Office	Warren and Mahoney	C. S. Luney Ltd	Demolished 2013	
34	Farmers Car Park Building, 194 Oxford Terrace	39.1 (128)	10	1998	Retail & car parking	Ian Krause	Lund Construction	Demolished 2013	
35	Craigs Investments (former Langwood House), 90 Armagh St	38.9 (128)	10	1987	Office	Sheppard & Rout	Lund Construction	Demolished 2013	
36	Christchurch Women's Hospital	38 (125)	9	2005	Hospital	Ministry of Works	Hawkins Construction	Reopened	
37	Huadu Innovation Hub (Former IRD Building)	37 (121)	8	2007	Office	Sumich Architects	C Lund and Son Construction	Repaired	
24	Oxford Apartments, 66 Oxford Tce	37 (121)	12	2005	Residential	Warren and Mahoney	C. S. Luney Ltd	Repaired	
38	Westminster House, 202 Cashel St	35.8 (117)	10	1978	Office	Warren and Mahoney	Williams Construction	Demolished 2012	
39	State Insurance Building, 116 Worcester St	35.6 (117)	10	1970	Office	Collins & Son	W. Williamson & Sons	To be repaired	
40	Christchurch Hospital, Riverside Block	35.5 (116)	8	1973	Hospital	Ministry of Works	Fletcher Construction	Reopened	
41	161 Hereford Suites (former Harmony Towers), 161 Hereford St	35.2 (115)	10	1988	Hotel	Gabites Porter & Partners	Highcroft Properties	To be repaired	
42	Copthorne Hotel, 335 Durham St	35 (115)	11	1986	Hotel		Williams Construction	Demolished 2011	
43	SBS House (former Manchester Unity Building), 180 Manchester St	35 (115)	10	1967	Office	Peter Beaven	Fletcher Construction	Demolished 2011	
44	Brannigans Building (former DFC Building), 86 Gloucester St	35 (115)	10	1987	Office	Warren and Mahoney	Forbes Construction	Demolished 2012	
45	Copthorne Hotel (former Ramada Inn), 776 Colombo St	35 (115)	10	1972	Hotel	Peter Beaven	Fletcher Construction	Demolished 2013	
46	The Gloucester, 28 Gloucester St	35 (115)	10	1991	Residential	Wilkie & Bruce	C. S. Luney Ltd	Open	
47	National Bank, 164 Hereford St	35 (115)	10	1980	Office	Warren and Mahoney	C. S. Luney Ltd	Demolished 2012	
48	National Insurance Building, 217 Gloucester St	35 (115)	10	1971	Office	Warren and Mahoney	Wilkins and Davies Construction	Demolished 2012	
49	AMI Insurance, 29–35 Latimer Sq	35 (115)	10	1972	Office	Warren and Mahoney	C. S. Luney Ltd	Demolished 2012	
50	Heatherlea Apartment, 10 Ayr St	35 (115)	12	1987	Residential	Wilkie & Bruce	Wilkins & Davies Construction	Demolished 2012	
51	Westpark Tower, 56 Cashel St	35 (115)	10	1987	Office	Sheppard & Rout	Hanham & Phillip	Demolished 2012	
52	Terrace on the Park Apartments, 80 Park Terrace	35 (115)	10	2000	Residential	Thom Craig	Mainzeal Construction	Demolished 2012	
53	The Millbrook Apartments, 21–23 Carlton Mill Rd	35 (115)	10	1965	Residential	Don Donnithorne	C.S. Luney Ltd	Demolished 2012	
54	The Establishment, 52 Peterborough St	35 (115)	11	2004	Residential	Warren and Mahoney	C.S. Luney Ltd	Demolished 2012	

== Timeline of tallest buildings ==
This is a list of the history of the tallest buildings in Christchurch, showing those buildings that once held the title of tallest building in chronological order.

Building remaining after earthquakes
Building demolished since the earthquakes

Name	Image	Years as tallest	Height m / feet	Reference
Manchester Courts		1906–1967	39.6 m (130 ft)	
BNZ Building		1967–1973	51 m (167 ft)	
Christchurch Central Police Station		1973–1974	52 m (171 ft)	
James Hight Building		1974–1975	53 m (174 ft)	
Sheraton Hotel (former Noah's)		1975–1986	54 m (177 ft)	
Hotel Grand Chancellor		1986–2010	85 m (279 ft)	
Pacific Tower		2010–present	86.5 m (284 ft)	

== See also ==
- List of tallest structures in New Zealand
- List of tallest buildings and structures in Auckland
- List of tallest buildings in Wellington
- Twinkle Toes
- List of tallest buildings in Oceania
