= Christchurch Central Police Station =

Former police headquarters in New Zealand

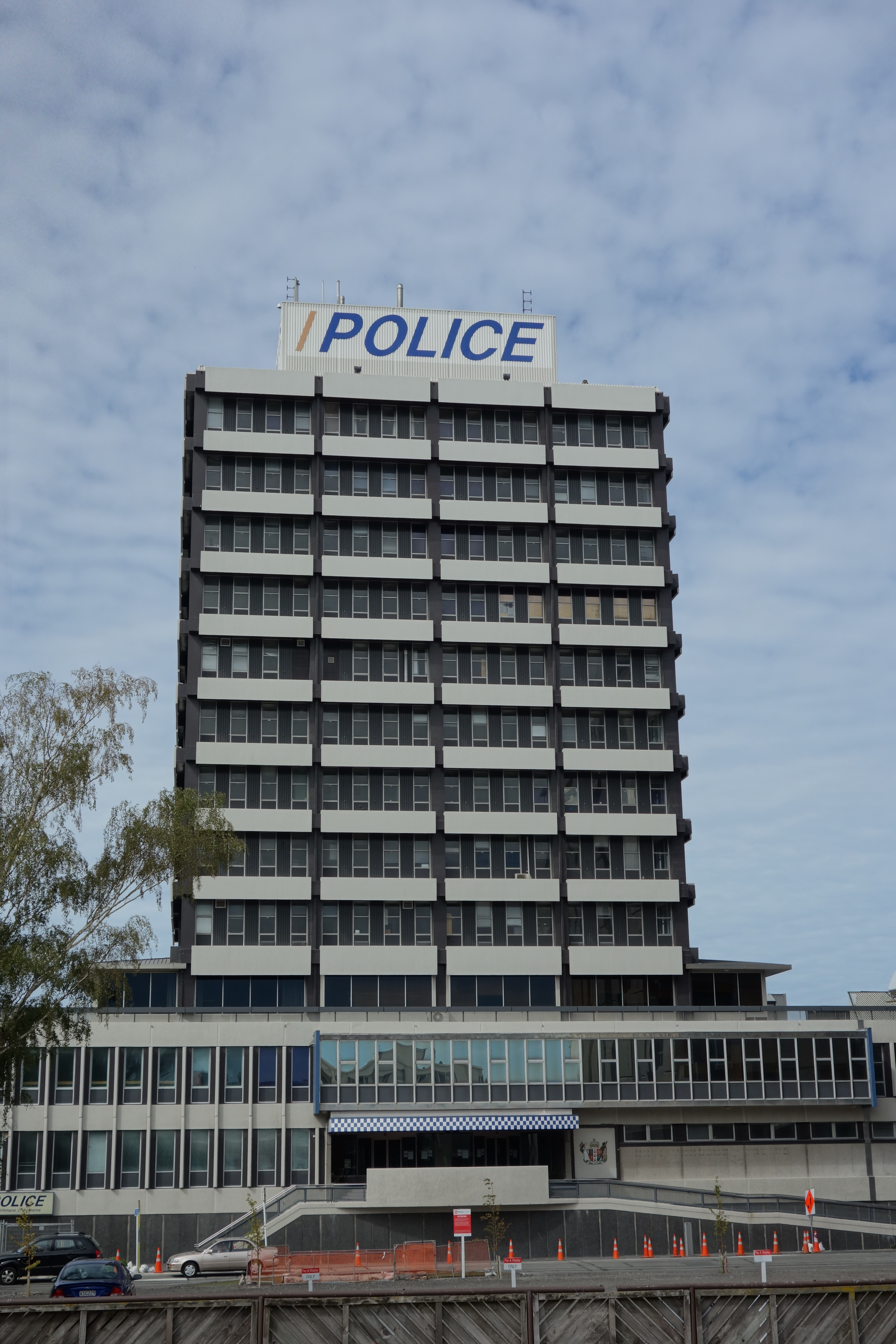
Christchurch Central Police Station in February 2013

The Christchurch Central Police Station was the former headquarters of the Canterbury Police District. Once the tallest building in Christchurch, New Zealand, it was damaged in the 2011 Christchurch earthquake and demolished by implosion on 31 May 2015.

== Location ==
The Christchurch Central Police Station was located in the block defined by Cambridge Terrace, Hereford Street, Montreal Street, and Cashel Street. From here, Police controlled the Canterbury Police District, which stretches from the Conway River in the north to the Waitaki River in the south, with the Main Divide forming the western boundary.

== History ==
The 15-storey high-rise was designed in 1968 by the Ministry of Works for the New Zealand Police. It was opened in 1973 and at 52 metres (171 ft) high, it was the tallest building in Christchurch until it was succeeded by the University of Canterbury's library building a year later.

Whilst the Police never vacated the building after the earthquake, staff had ongoing concerns over its stability. In December 2011, Police announced that they would move to new temporary offices over the next few months. The building owner, Ngāi Tahu, announced in April 2014 that the building would be demolished. In November 2014, it was announced that the demolition would be carried out by implosion.

=== Implosion ===
In early March 2015, it was reported on social media that the implosion was scheduled for 18 April, and as even some mainstream media outlets reported that date, the contractor issued an official statement that no date had been set yet. In early May, it was announced that the implosion was scheduled for Saturday morning, 30 May 2015, with the Sunday morning as a bad-weather alternative. The organisers of the Christchurch Marathon found out about the implosion through the media; the marathon was to go through the Hereford / Cambridge intersection on Sunday morning. As a result, the implosion was delayed until 5 pm on the Sunday. The Ministry of Education building now occupies the site.

== Notes ==
Records
Preceded by BNZ Building	Tallest building in Christchurch; 1973–1974	Succeeded by James Hight Building
