= Twinkle Toes =

Excavator

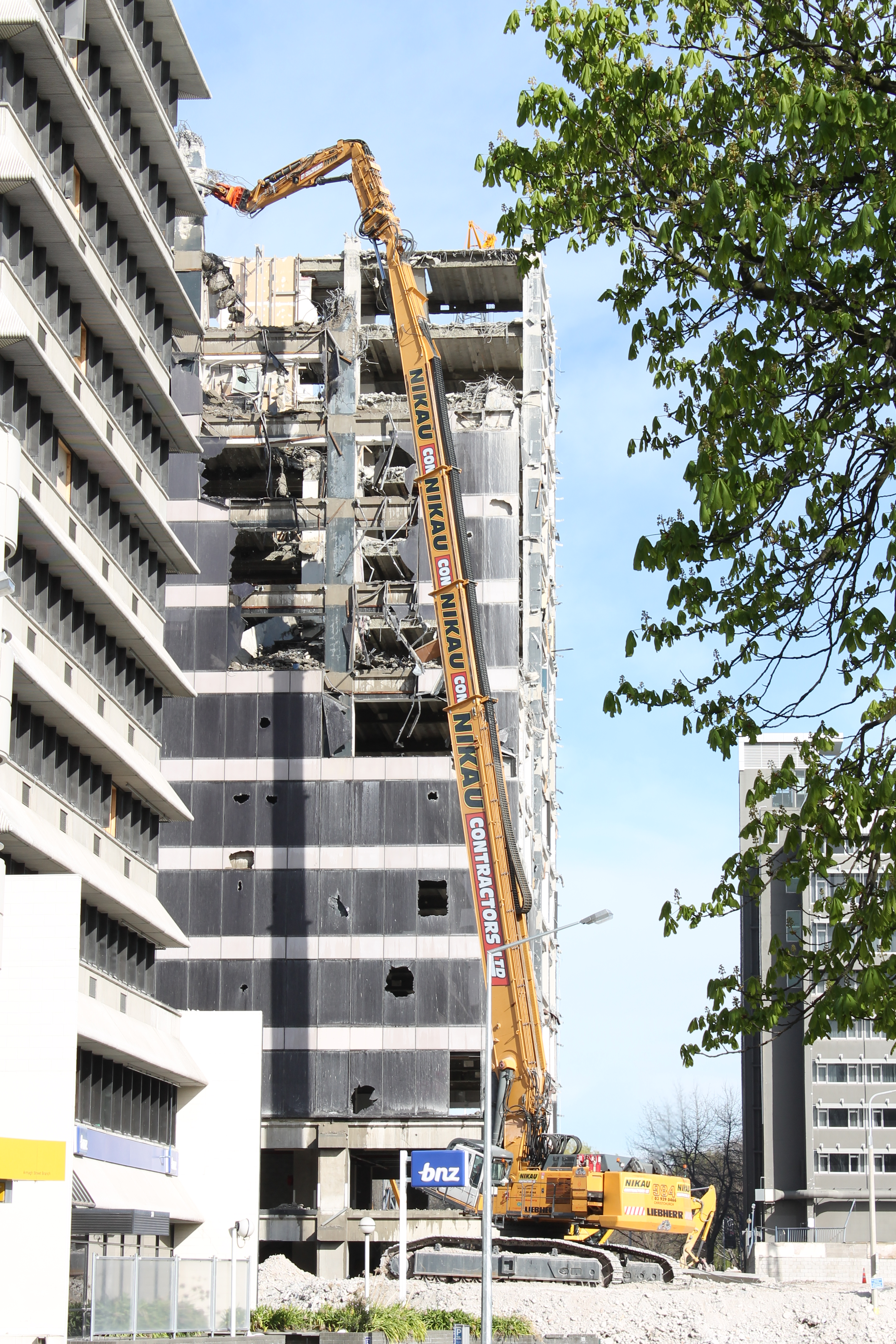
Twinkle Toes demolishing the PricewaterhouseCoopers building in September 2012

Twinkle Toes is the largest excavator in the Southern Hemisphere. It was used in Christchurch to demolish tall buildings following the 2010 and 2011 earthquakes before moving to Wellington following the 2016 Kaikōura earthquake.

== History and description ==
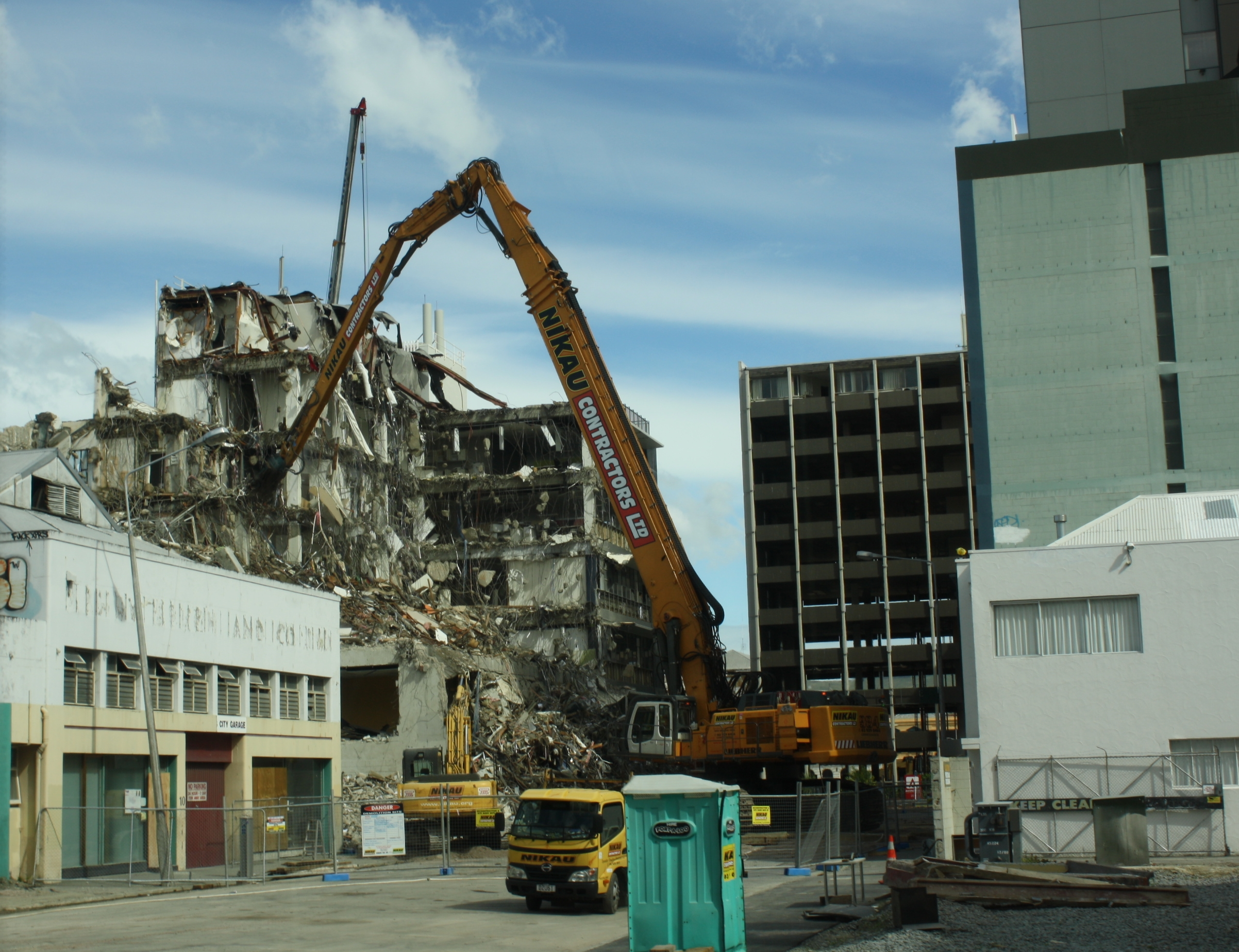
Twinkle Toes' first Christchurch demolition in Liverpool Street in November 2011; note that the telescoping arm is not extended

The excavator is based on a 2008 Liebherr 984 that was heavily modified by Kocurek Excavators Ltd for the Birmingham-based demolition Coleman & Company. It was bought for around NZ$4m and imported to New Zealand by Auckland-based demolition firm Nikau Contractors, and arrived in the Port of Lyttelton in September 2011. The tracked excavator weighs 220 tonnes (220 long tons; 240 short tons) and has a maximum reach of 65 metres (213 ft). When the telescoping arm is not extended, the reach is 25 metres (82 ft). The excavator is not suited for demolishing the bottom two storeys of a building. At full reach, a 2.5 tonnes (2.5 long tons; 2.8 short tons) demolition attachment can be fitted to the hydraulic boom. At 40 metres (130 ft) reach, the machine can handle a 6 tonnes (5.9 long tons; 6.6 short tons) concrete breaker. The excavator got its nickname following a naming competition on Christchurch radio station More FM.

== Demolitions ==
- Early November 2011 – Office building on the corner of Liverpool and Cashel Streets in early November 2011.
- Late November 2011 – Headquarters of AMI Insurance in Latimer Square.
- Early 2012 – Hotel Grand Chancellor, Christchurch, second tallest building in Christchurch.
- September 2012 – PricewaterhouseCoopers building in Armagh Street. Largest building in Christchurch by mass.
- September/October 2012 – Farmers car parking building in Gloucester Street.
- Mid/late October 2012 – Centra Building (Holiday Inn) on the corner of Cashel and High Street in October 2012.
- Late 2012/early 2013 – Westpac Canterbury Centre.
- Date unknown – Ibis House, Hereford Street.
- Late 2017 – Defence (Freyberg) House, Wellington.
- Date unknown – Work on Port Taranaki Power Station.

== See also ==
- List of tallest buildings in Christchurch
