= Pacific Tower, Christchurch =

Tallest building in Christchurch, New Zealand

Pacific Tower
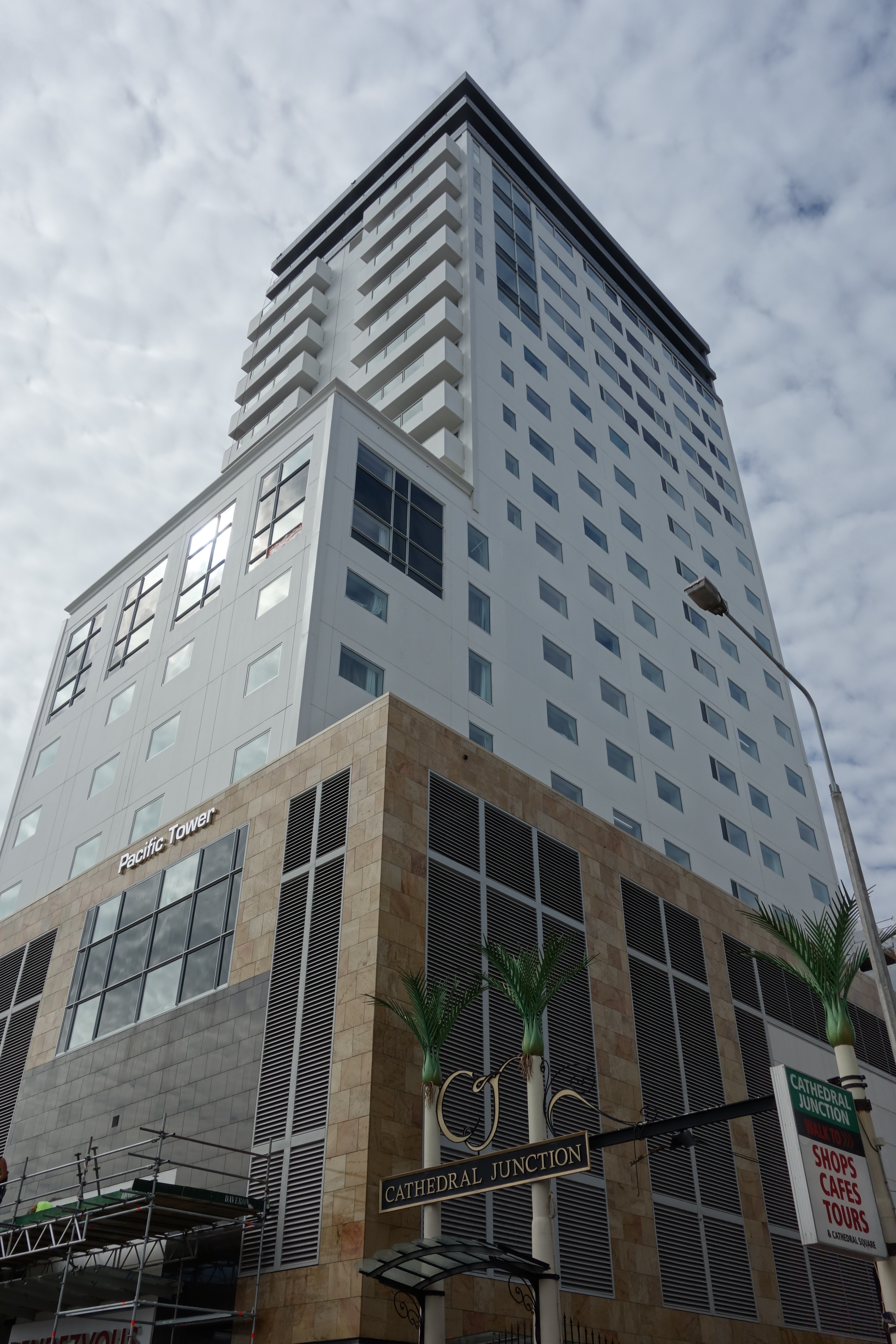
- Christchurch's tallest building, the Pacific Tower, viewed from Gloucester Street

General information
- Type: Hotel high rise
- Location: Christchurch Central City, 166 Gloucester Street, Christchurch, New Zealand
- Coordinates: 43°31′48″S 172°38′20″E
- Construction started: 2008
- Completed: 2010
- Owner: Equity Trust Pacific
- Operator: Rendezvous Hotels

Height
- Antenna spire: 86.5 m (284 ft)
- Roof: 73.4 m (241 ft)

Technical details
- Floor count: 23 storeys

Design and construction
- Architect: Rob Campbell
- Developer: Ernst Duval
- Structural engineer: Structex
- Main contractor: AMC Construction

The Pacific Tower, located in the central city of Christchurch, New Zealand, has since its construction in 2010 been the city's tallest building at 86.5 metres (284 ft) in height, succeeding the Hotel Grand Chancellor and the PricewaterhouseCoopers building. It is also the tallest building in the world further south than Wellington. A major user of the building is the 171-room Rendezvous Hotel. The building was closed from the February 2011 Christchurch earthquake until 1 May 2013 for repairs. Levels 1 to 14 are used for the hotel, levels 15 to 22 are apartments and Level 23 is for services and plant room.

== History ==
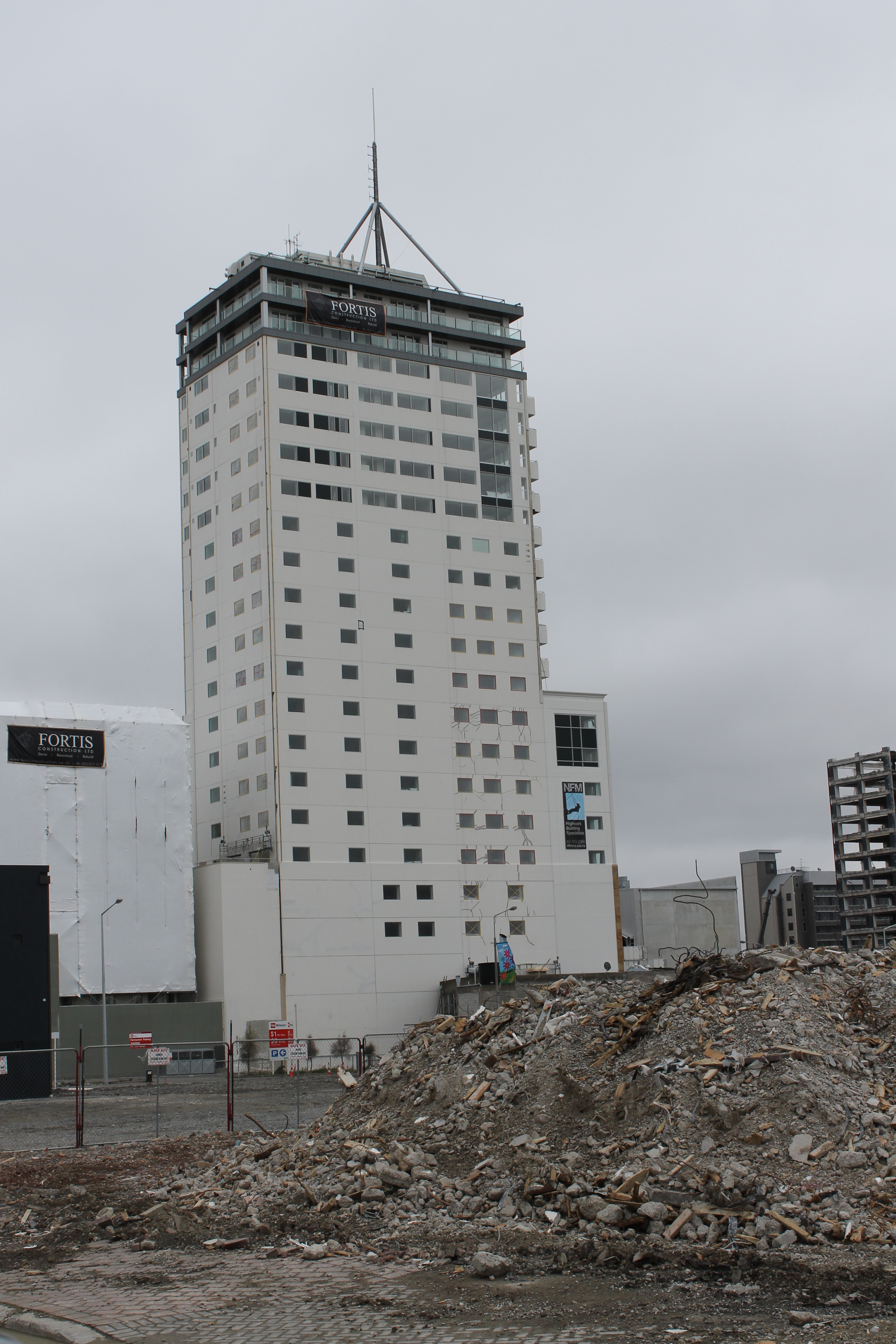
Pacific Tower viewed from the east

Pacific Tower was one of three high rises that were constructed in 2010; the other two were the HSBC Tower in Worcester Boulevard, and the Novotel Hotel in Cathedral Square. All three of these buildings survived the 2010 and 2011 earthquakes, unlike many of the older high rises. The lower floors are occupied by a hotel, and upper floors hold apartments. The hotel initially opened under the name The Marque, but was later rebranded as Rendezvous Hotel. The owner of Pacific Tower intended to have it open again by March 2012 in time for the Ellerslie Flower Show, tapping into the visitor market at a time when no other large hotels had reopened. However, the Canterbury Earthquake Recovery Authority required additional structural checks, which found significant problems, and the owner intended to open again before the second anniversary of the 2011 Christchurch earthquake. The reopening was further delayed and a new date of 10 April 2013 was announced, which was again not met. The latest date for reopening was set for 1 May 2013, and on that day, the hotel with 171 rooms reopened for business.

== Earthquake performance ==
Pacific Tower survived the earthquakes very well, where just one fractured active link required replacing, and a further three weakened links were removed for testing by the two civil engineering universities in New Zealand, in Auckland and Christchurch. The eccentrically braced frame (EBF) link that fractured was the first failure of this building element worldwide (another EBF fractured in one of the city's parking buildings) and was thus of scientific interest.

Structural engineer John Scarry, who is known in New Zealand as an ardent critic of his peers, praised the design of the Pacific Tower and the HSBC building in Worcester Boulevard (another steel frame building) as good examples of how buildings should be designed. The earthquake performance demonstrates the resilience and economic value of steel-framed buildings—any damaged components can be removed and replaced. Completed in 2010 and comprising eccentrically braced steel frames cast integrally with composite metal deck slabs, the building also incorporates several innovative features. These include car stackers, cranked braces and ‘super’ moment-resisting frames at ground floor level. The latter removed the need for braces from the front elevations of the building, allowing unobstructed views. These features all helped the building to withstand the extreme forces it experienced during the many earthquakes of 2010 and 2011.

== See also ==
- List of tallest buildings in Christchurch
- Clarendon Tower

Records
Preceded by Hotel Grand Chancellor	Tallest building in Christchurch; 2010–present	Incumbent
