= Club Tower =

Commercial building in Christchurch, New Zealand

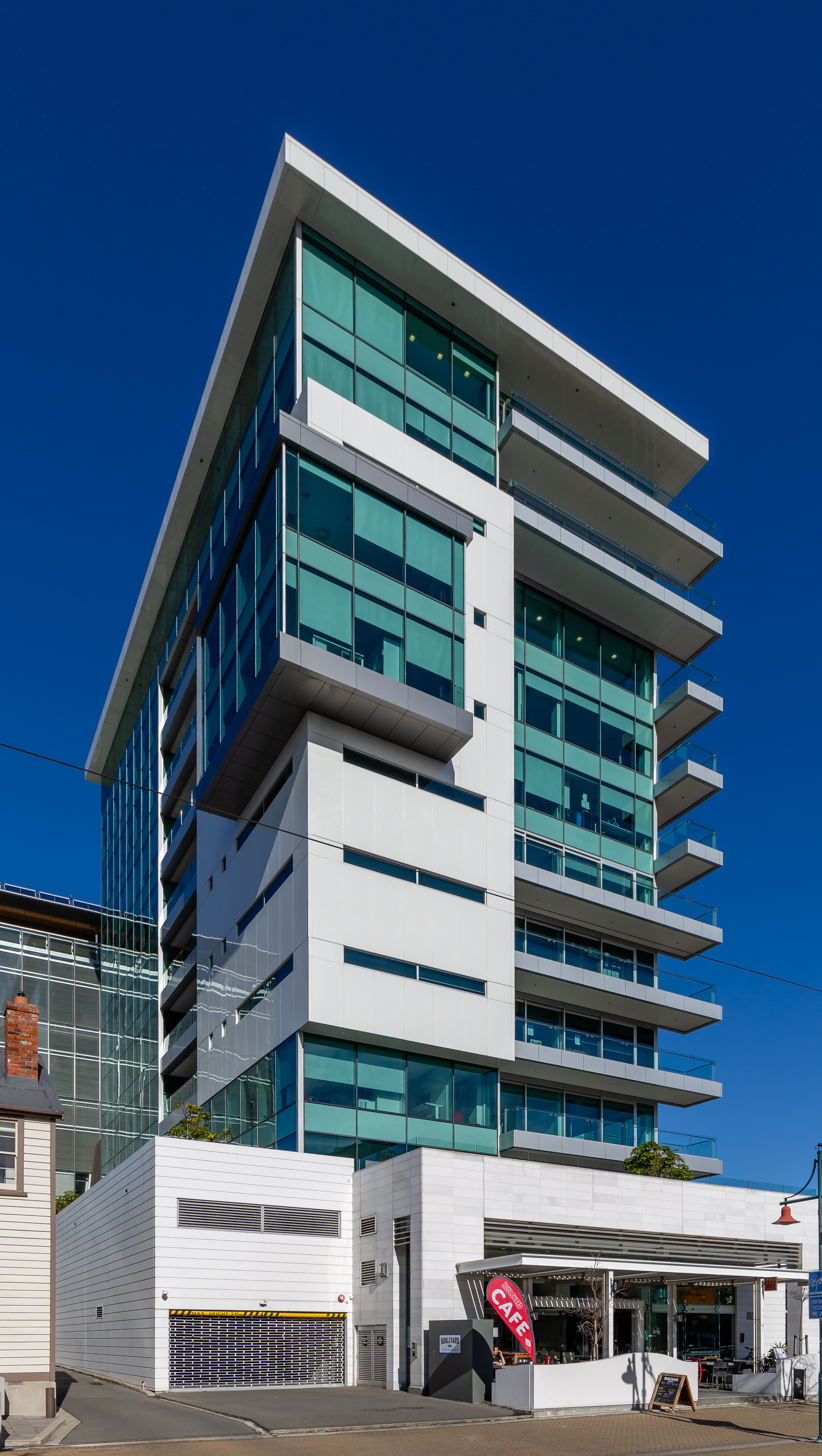
- Club Tower in 2019
- Interactive map of the Club Tower area
- Alternative names: Anthony Harper Tower, HSBC Building

General information
- Type: Commercial
- Architectural style: Contemporary
- Location: Christchurch Central, New Zealand
- Coordinates: 43°31′52″S 172°37′55″E
- Year built: 2007–2009
- Height: 45 meters

Technical details
- Floor count: 13
- Floor area: 10000 square meters

Design and construction
- Architecture firm: Weirwalker Architecture
- Main contractor: Hawkins
- Awards and prizes: ADNZ National Winner in Sustainable Design & Special Projects

Club Tower (also known as the Anthony Harper Tower, and formerly the HSBC Building) is a contemporary tower in the centre of Christchurch, New Zealand. Built in the late 2000s, it was the first building in Christchurch to receive a 5-star rating under the voluntary Green Star sustainability system, and was the first A-grade commercial building completed in the city since 1989. It received a national sustainability award in 2009 by Architectural Designers New Zealand.

Club Tower gets its namesake from the neighbouring Canterbury Club, and was built on land purchased from the historical society. However, the tower has been colloquially known by the names of various tenants who have occupied the building over the years and acquired the rights to add their logos to the facade. Until 2017, it was known as the HSBC Building, and subsequently, the Anthony Harper Tower.

Club Tower is considered one of the best performing structures in the city in terms of earthquake resilience, incurring no structural damage in the 2011 Christchurch earthquake, and has been the subject of case studies on high-rise earthquake performance.

== Construction and design ==
In 2004, Latitude Group purchased land from the historic Canterbury Club for a reported NZ$4m. The club used the funds to restore its neighbouring heritage building and build new amenities. As of such, the tower was named after the club.

Club Tower was designed by Robert Weir and Jason Walker, and constructed by Hawkins for Latitude Group. Construction began in late 2007 with site excavation in September, with construction taking place through 2008. The building was completed by 2009 and opened mid that year. The structure is approximately 45 meters tall and has thirteen levels, including three floors of parking from basement through to the first level, nine floors of commercial space, and two penthouses on the top floor. A cafe operates on the ground floor.

Club Tower was designed to meet a 5-star rating under the Green Star system, a voluntary sustainability rating system used throughout Australasia. It was the first building in Christchurch to achieve this standard, as well as being one of the first A-grade commercial buildings constructed in the city since 1989. The tower is supported by a 350 tonne steel structure made from 97% recycled materials.

=== Earthquake performance ===
As a new structure built to a modern standard, Club Tower did not experience any structural damage from either the 2010 Canterbury earthquake nor the 2011 Christchurch earthquake and subsequent aftershocks, and is regarded as a good example of high-rise earthquake performance. Some minor, non-structural damage was addressed following the latter event, mainly drywall damage. In 2018 as a precautionary measure, Structex implemented a reinforced concrete basement raft foundation to provide additional protection from neighbouring structures.

Following the 2011 earthquake, the Canterbury Earthquake Recovery Authority moved into the building due to its safety and central location, with CEO Roger Sutton occupying a top-floor office. The tower was reopened in July and was fully occupied, becoming one of the first large buildings in Christchurch to do so.

== Ownership and tenancy ==
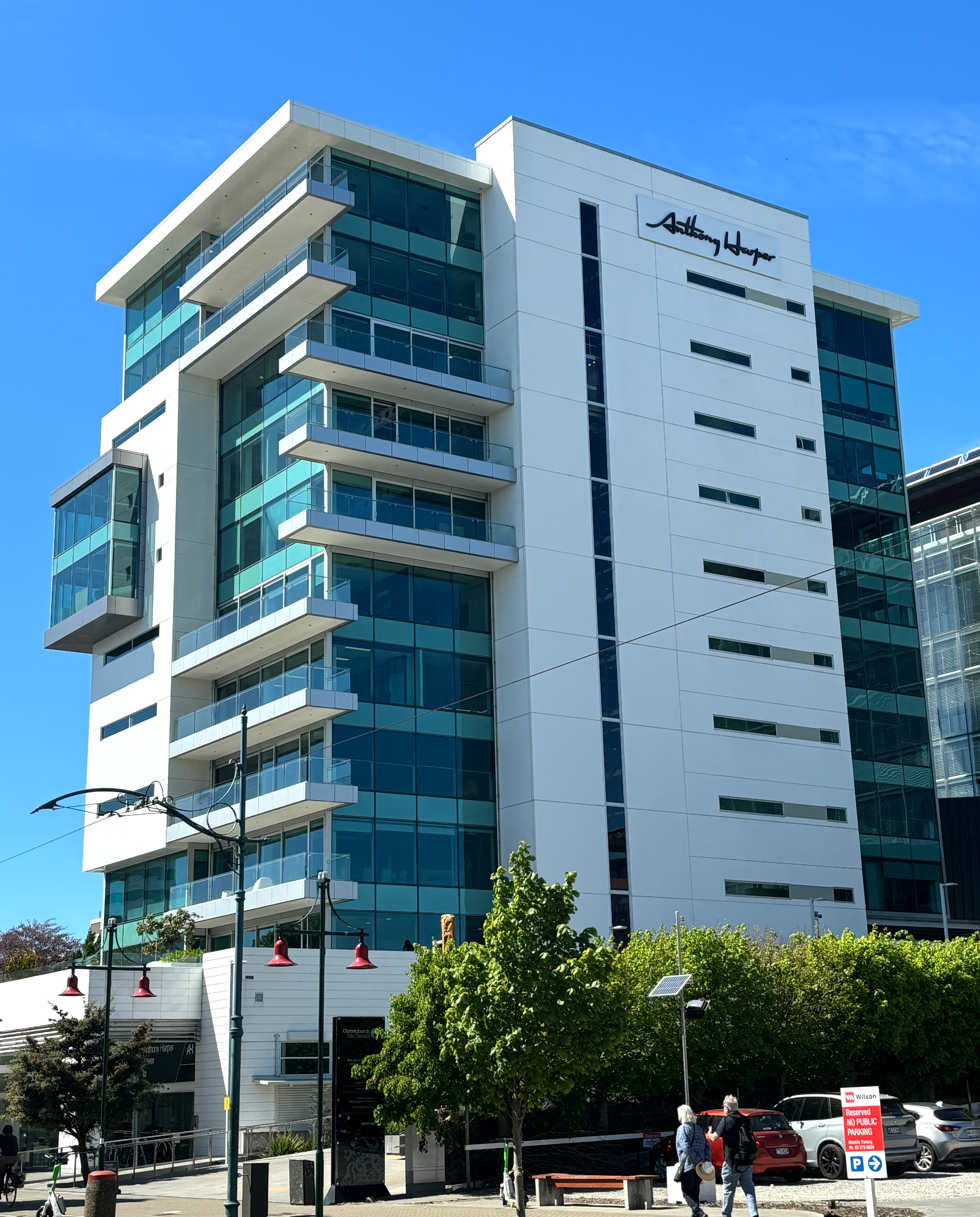
Club Tower in 2024 with the Anthony Harper branding

Club Tower opened in mid-2009. In 2010, Latitude Group listed the building for sale, seeking to release money to use on other projects. In 2012, Latitude Group sold the building to City Mall landlord Nick Hunt for NZ$26m. It is currently held by his company, Lichfield Holdings.

As one of the original tenants, HSBC occupied the upper floors and originally branded the building with its logo. The company continued to lease the office space until 2017, when it was announced HSBC would be leaving the tower and moving its operations to Wellington. The tower is now branded with the logos of its current main tenant, Anthony Harper.

As of 2024, the building is home to government agencies and high-profile local and international organisations, including Savills New Zealand, Crown-owned company Ōtākaro, private wealth management company JBWere, and Colliers International.

== See also ==
- List of tallest buildings in Christchurch
