= Manchester Courts =

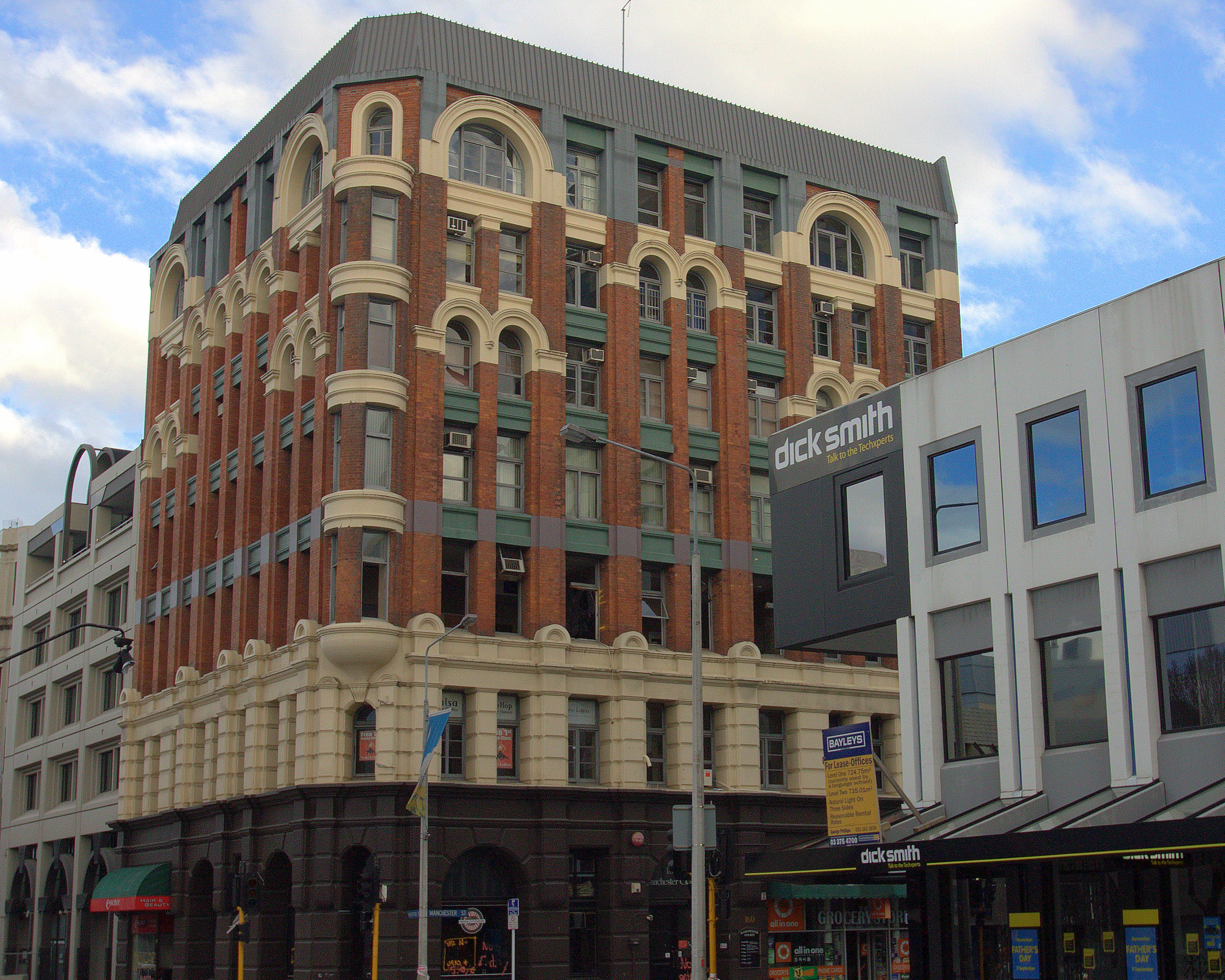
- Manchester Courts was condemned following the 2010 Canterbury earthquake
- Interactive map of the Manchester Courts area
- Former names: MLC Building
- Alternative names: New Zealand Express Company Building

General information
- Type: Commercial high-rise
- Architectural style: Chicago skyscraper
- Location: Corner Hereford and Manchester Sts, Christchurch Central City, 158–160 Manchester Street; Christchurch
- Coordinates: 43.5322°S 172.6399°E
- Construction started: 1905
- Completed: 1906
- Renovated: 1986–87
- Demolished: 2010–11
- Cost: £19,000
- Client: New Zealand Express Company
- Owner: Ferry Oak Properties

Height
- Height: 39.65 m (130.1 ft)

Technical details
- Floor count: 7

Design and construction
- Architects: Alfred and Edward Luttrell

Heritage New Zealand – Category 1
- Reference no.: 5307

Manchester Courts, earlier known as the MLC Building, was a commercial high-rise building in the central city of Christchurch, New Zealand. Built in 1905–1906 for the New Zealand Express Company, it was at the time the tallest commercial building in Christchurch. A Category I heritage building, it suffered serious structural damage in the 2010 Canterbury earthquake and was condemned to be demolished. Demolition began on 19 October, and was completed in late January 2011.

== History ==
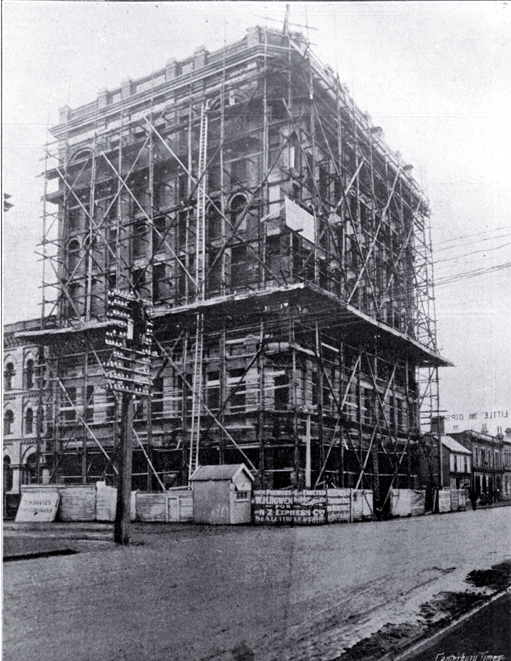
Manchester Courts under construction in 1906

Manchester Courts was commissioned by the New Zealand Express Company, which had its headquarters in Dunedin with offices throughout the country. They worked in freight forwarding, customs, shipping and express forwarding agents. At the beginning of the 20th century, they were a major employer in New Zealand.

The company engaged architects Sidney and Alfred Luttrell with the design of their Christchurch head offices. The architects had been in the country since 1902, and they are credited with introducing the Chicago skyscraper architectural style to New Zealand, and blending it with Edwardian architecture. The Luttrells' buildings also included the same commissioners' 1908 New Zealand Express House (now Consultancy House) in The Exchange, Dunedin — the city's first skyscraper — which shares many features with Manchester Courts.

From 1991 it had a Category I classification with the New Zealand Historic Places Trust. In 1986–1987, the building was refurbished, had its parapet removed and was reclad in steel.

== Structural design ==
Manchester Courts is believed to have been the first steel reinforced commercial building in Christchurch. The foundations and the two lower stories were made from reinforced concrete. The upper five stories had external unreinforced brick columns that were load bearing, while the interior was made of steel framing.

== Demolition ==
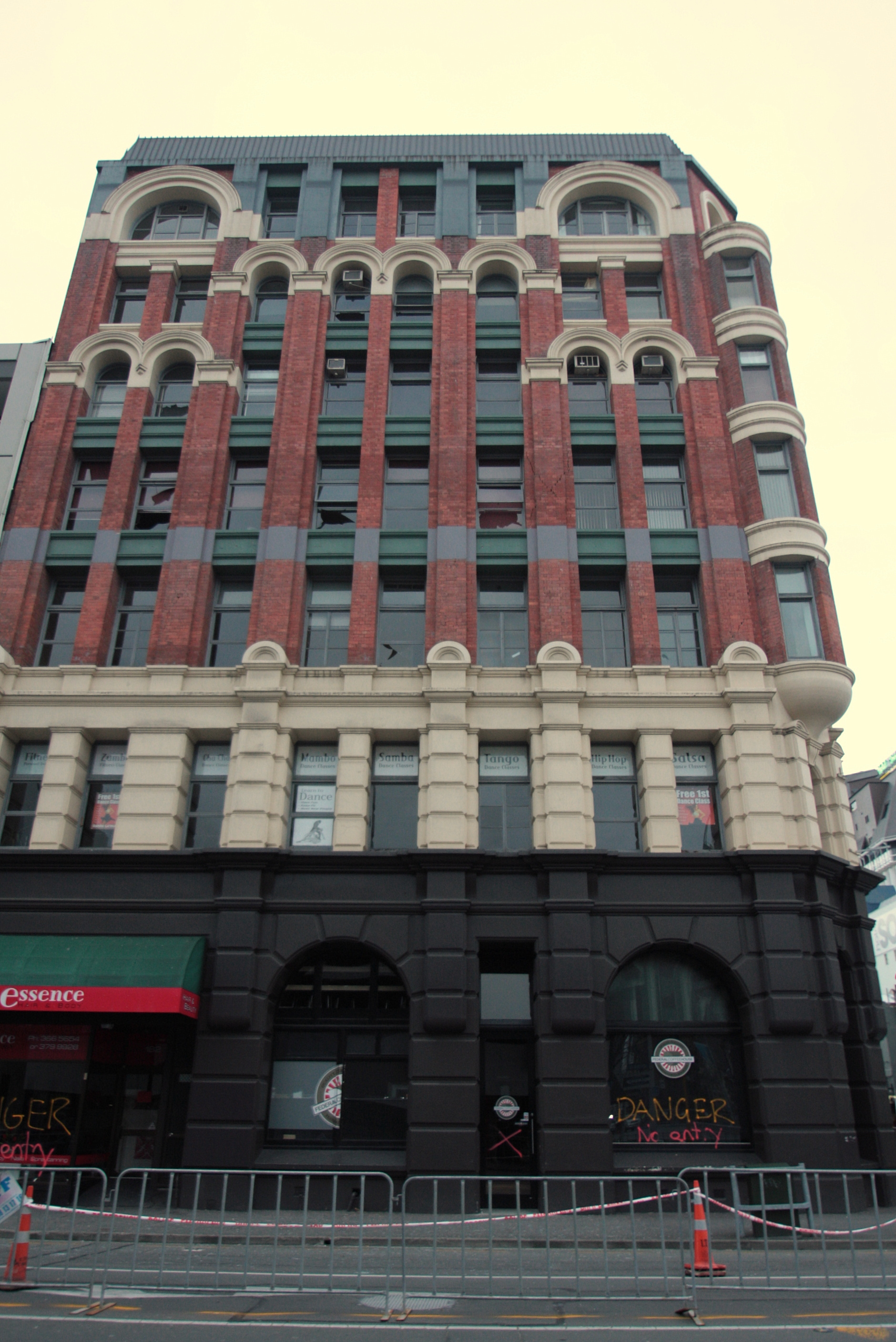
The north face showed large cracks and broken windows

Manchester Courts suffered significant structural damage in the 2010 Canterbury earthquake (4 September). The masonry columns were left badly cracked on level three and four and showed shear failure. According to the New Zealand Society for Earthquake Engineering, this was due to the load transfer from the reinforced concrete floor to the unreinforced brick columns, and was further caused by the two storey building adjoining on the south side stopping to provide lateral support at that height. Diagonal cracking on the top floor indicated damage from torsional forces.

The building was deemed unsafe and was one of just two historic CBD buildings the City Council initially proposed for immediate demolition. That decision was reversed hours later when the building's owner proposed to dismantle the building over several weeks. A 60 m (200 ft) cordon was established around the building to guarantee public safety.

Christchurch City Council voted 10 to 2 at their 6 October 2010 meeting that the building was a safety hazard and should thus be demolished. The council's CEO was given powers to issue a demolition warrant, which avoided the usual resource consent process that could take up to 18 months. The demolition warrant could be granted under section 129 of the Building Act 2004, where "immediate danger to the safety of people is likely". Consequently, resource consent was not required for the demolition.

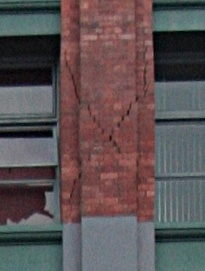
Detail showing damage to one masonry column

Heritage enthusiasts and others protested against demolition, arguing that the masonry columns would have been reinforced with steel, and that the council should obtain its own engineering report, not rely on that commissioned by the building's owner. The owner presented evidence of further damage in aftershocks and pressed for urgent demolition, saying he had been advised that the building was showing signs of impending failure.

The fate of Manchester Courts attracted significant media attention. TV One had the demolition decision as their anchor story for their 6 pm news. Demolition started on 19 October, and was completed in late January 2011. The building, significantly weakened by the removal of key structural supports by demolition engineers, withstood a number of large aftershocks without collapsing.

During the demolition, an opponent of the demolition said he had photographs showing that the building did indeed contain substantial steel reinforcement. The building's owner said that less steel had been found than expected, and the mayor stood by the decision to demolish.

Records
New title First high-rise in the city	Tallest building in Christchurch; 1906–1967	Succeeded by BNZ Building
