= Canterbury Club =

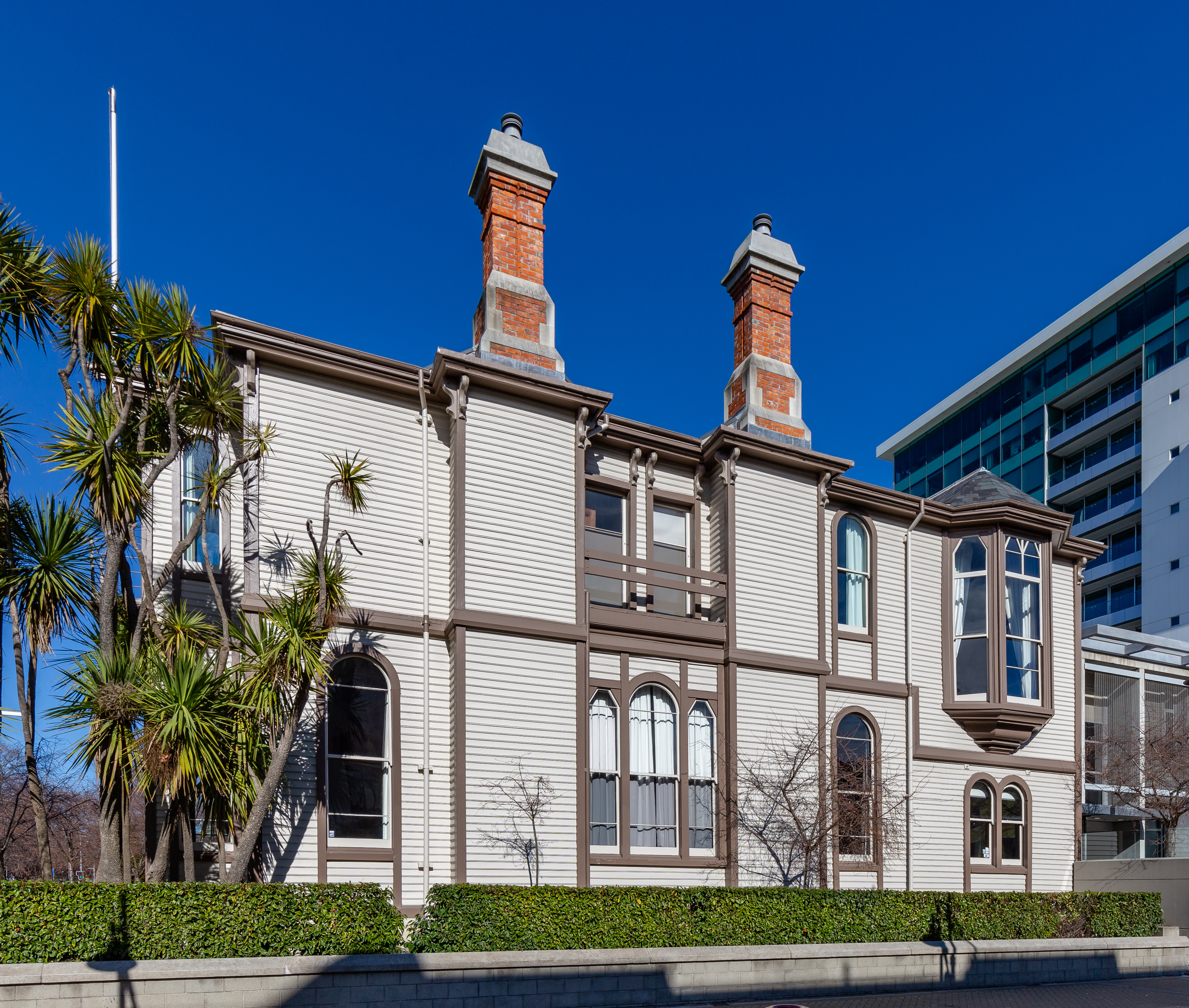
- Canterbury Club, August 2019
- Interactive map of the Canterbury Club area

General information
- Type: Gentlemen's Club
- Location: Christchurch Central City, 129 Cambridge Terrace, Christchurch, New Zealand
- Coordinates: 43.53115°S 172.63238°E
- Construction started: 1873

Technical details
- Floor count: Two

Design and construction
- Architect: Frederick Strouts
- Main contractor: Daniel Reese

Heritage New Zealand – Category 2
- Reference no.: 1837

References
- "Canterbury Club". New Zealand Heritage List/Rārangi Kōrero. Heritage New Zealand.

The Canterbury Club is a historic gentlemen's club in the central city of Christchurch, New Zealand. It was founded by urban professionals in 1872 as a breakaway club from the Christchurch Club, which had been set up by large rural landholders in 1856.

== History ==
The Christchurch Club had been founded by wealthy runholders in 1856. Their permanent premises were built adjacent to Latimer Square to a design by Benjamin Mountfort. Urban businessmen and professionals found that their interests differed from the rural gentry, and in 1872 founded their own gentlemen's club, the Canterbury Club. They commissioned one of their members, William Armson, to design a building, but he fell ill and in early 1873 the commission was passed to Frederick Strouts instead. Strouts was guided by the lead that Mountfort had taken with the Christchurch Club a decade earlier and also chose Italianate architecture as the style for the building, to be erected on a site on the corner of Cambridge Terrace and Worcester Street. The construction contract went to tender in May 1873 and Daniel Reese was chosen as the builder.

In 2004, the Canterbury Club sold neighbouring land to Latitude Group for a reported NZ$4M, raising funds to do restoration work on the historic building. Latitude Group constructed Club Tower on the purchased site, named in reference to the history of the land.

The building was strengthened in 2008–09 and this work was the reason that the 2010 and 2011 earthquakes caused only moderate damage. After earthquake repairs had been done, the premises reopened on 8 June 2012. A dress code has applied since the club was founded.

== Heritage registrations ==
The building was registered by the New Zealand Historic Places Trust (since renamed to Heritage New Zealand) on 25 November 1982 as a Category II historic place. Outside the front door on the Cambridge Terrace frontage, two further heritage items are registered as Category II: a gas light, and a hitching post. The gas light was installed for public lighting in circa 1900, but the gas lighting system was switched off in 1918 when municipal electricity had become available. Somehow, this particular gas lamp was never removed, and it was restored for the February 1963 royal visit by Queen Elizabeth II. Years later, the lamp was shifted a short distance to be located outside of the club's main entrance. The lamp was still run on gas for many years after the gasworks closed in 1985, but in the 1990s, the Canterbury Club converted it to an electric light. In 1999, the Christchurch City Council and the Canterbury Club reinstated gas supply to the lamp. Adjacent to the gas light is a hitching post, erected in the 1870s or 1880s by the club for members to tether their horses. Once common throughout colonial towns, there are very few remaining today.

Registered heritage items at the Canterbury Club

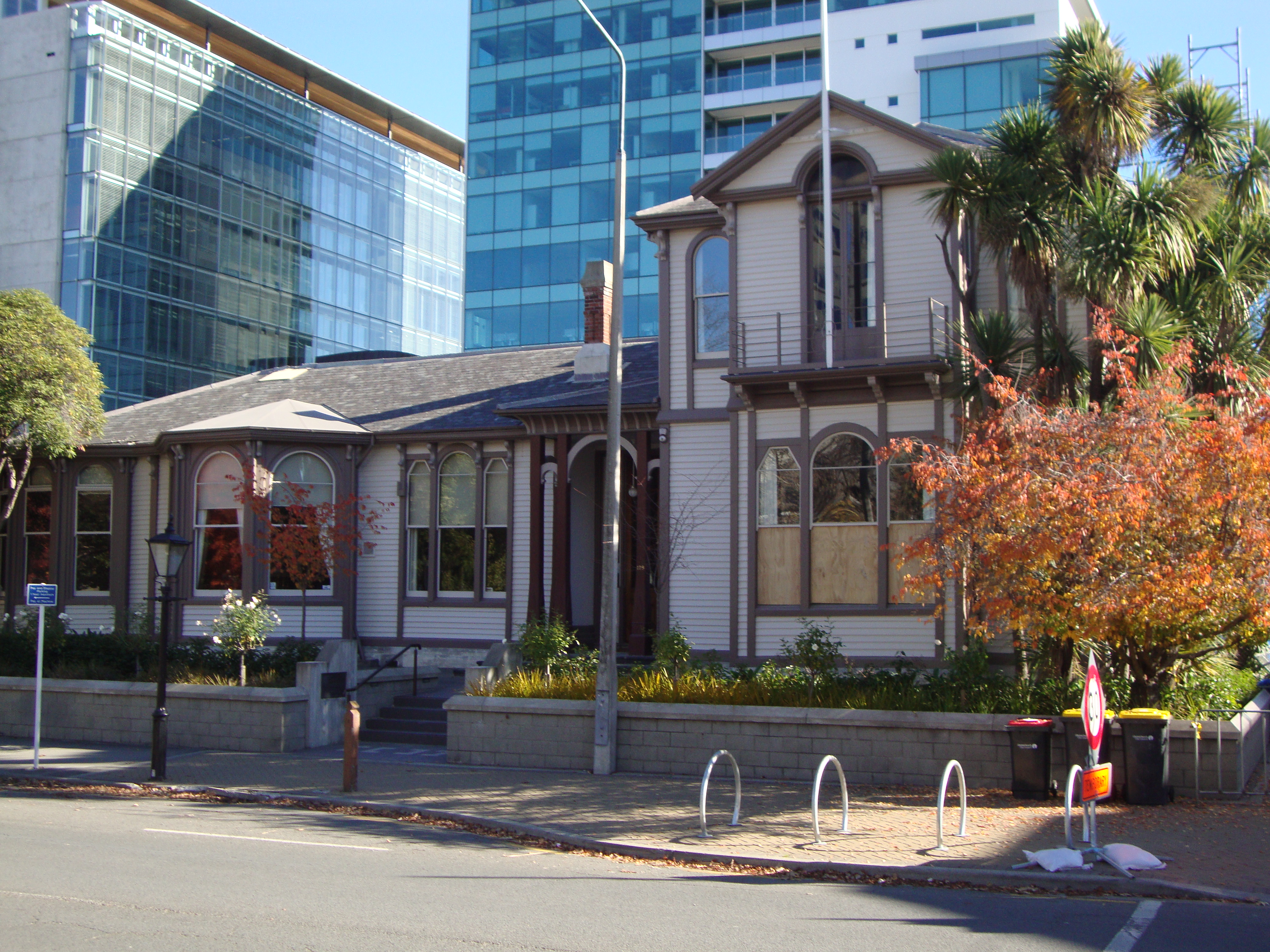
The Cambridge Terrace frontage of the Canterbury Club

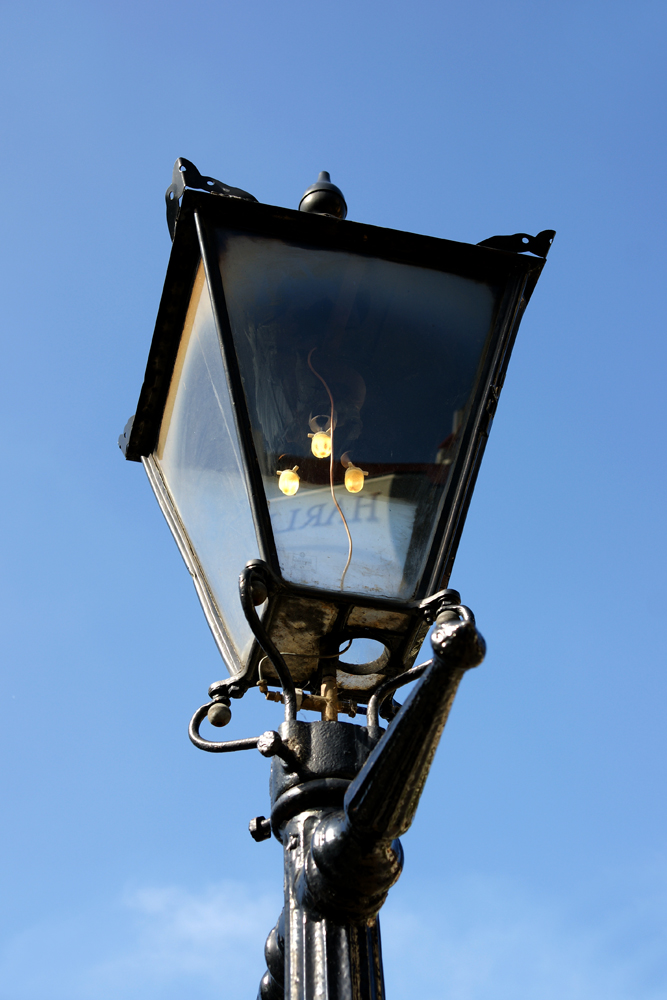
Detail of the gas light

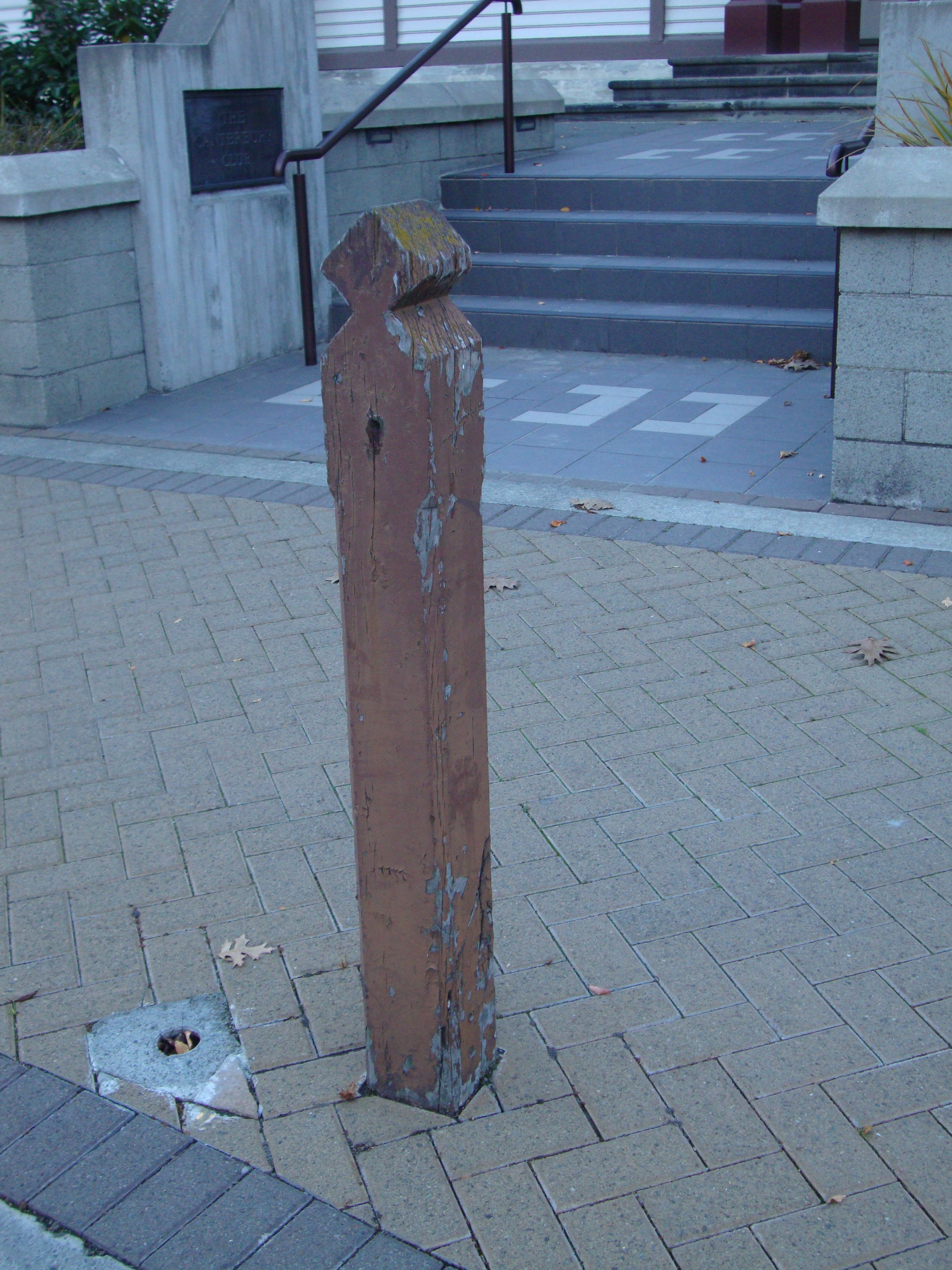
Close up of the hitching post

== See also ==
- List of oldest buildings in Christchurch
