= Westpac Canterbury Centre =

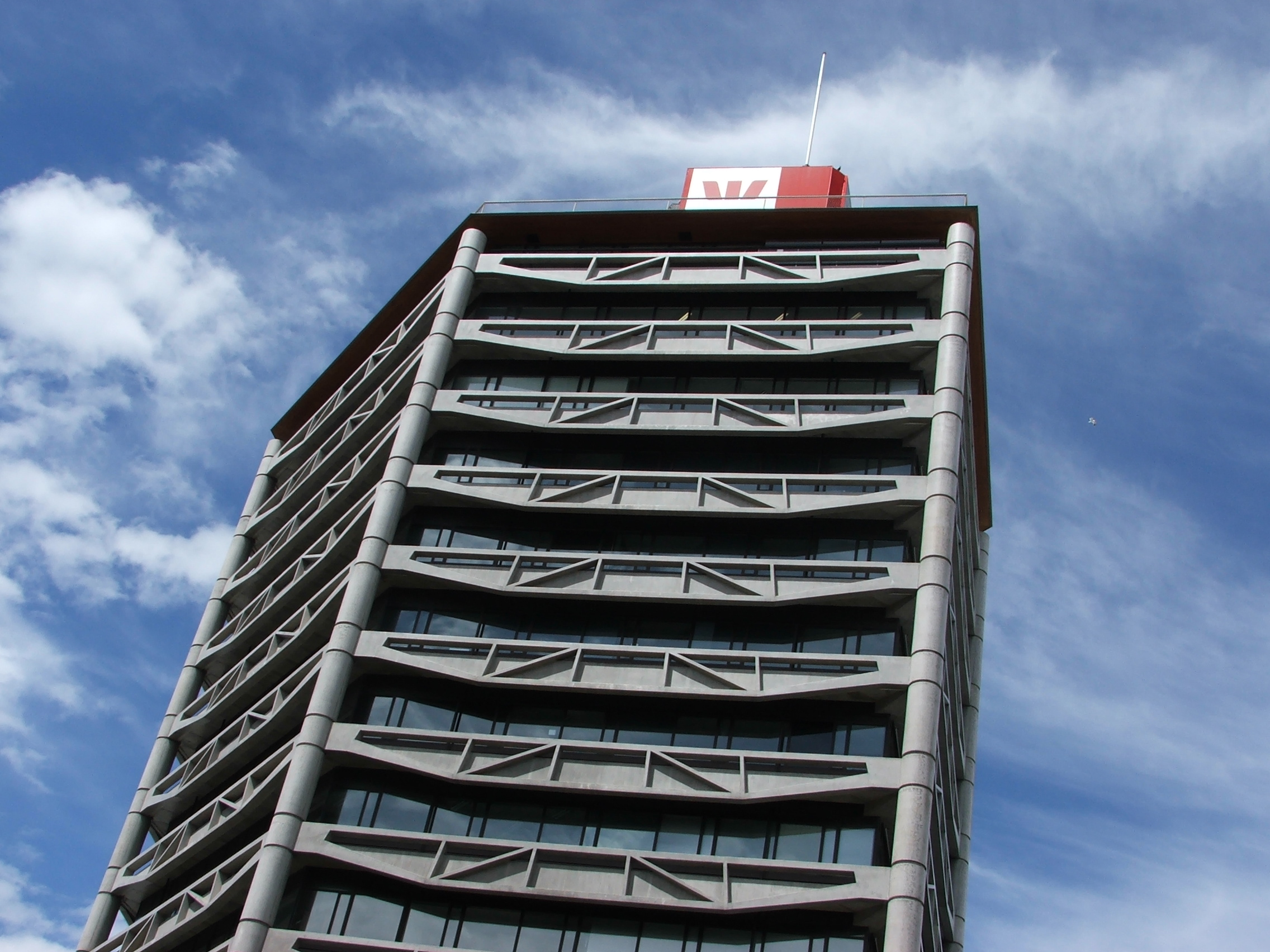
- Westpac Canterbury Centre in 2006
- Interactive map of the Westpac Canterbury Centre area
- Alternative names: Westpac Building, Westpac Trust Building, Canterbury Centre

General information
- Type: Commercial
- Architectural style: Structural expressionist
- Location: Christchurch Central, New Zealand
- Coordinates: 43°32′00″S 172°38′17″E
- Year built: 1983
- Destroyed: September 2010
- Demolished: May–November 2012

Height
- Height: 55 metres

Technical details
- Floor count: 13

Design and construction
- Architecture firm: Warren and Mahoney
- Engineer: Holmes Wood Poole & Johnstone Engineers
- Main contractor: C.S. Luney LTD

The Westpac Canterbury Centre (also known as the Westpac Building, Westpac Trust Building, and Canterbury Centre) was a landmark tower on the corner of High Street and Cashel Street in the center of Christchurch, New Zealand. In the early 2010s, it was considered the 9th tallest building in Christchurch, standing at 55 metres tall with 13-storeys and a basement level.

Designed by Warren and Mahoney in 1981, the building had a distinct look, with rounded concrete columns on each corner and a pointed triangular roof. From above, it was shaped like an elongated hexagon. In Christchurch architecture, it was an early example of the move away from brutalism towards structural expressionism, with the outer aesthetic exposing much of the concrete frame.

The building was constructed by C.S. Luney LTD for NZ$6.4 million in 1983 for Canterbury Savings Bank, which later became Trust Bank. In 1996, Westpac acquired the bank and phased out the brand. It served as the head office of Westpac in the South Island until the building was finally closed. The lower floors, including the connected podium structure next to it, served as retail space.

In 2010, the tower was cordoned-off and emptied following damage in the 2010 Canterbury earthquake, which included visible spalling to the outer columns, posing a risk to pedestrians. It was deemed salvageable and structural repairs started within months. However, the building suffered further damage in the 2011 Christchurch earthquake, with inelastic deformation occurring in the shear walls cited as a major factor. Due to complicated repairs and the relative age of the building, it was demolished in 2012.

== History ==
=== Construction and original tenants ===
The Westpac Canterbury Centre was constructed in 1983 for the Trust Bank (then named Canterbury Savings Bank) at 166 Cashel Street. It was designed in 1981 by architectural firm Warren and Mahoney and Holmes Wood Poole & Johnstone Engineers, and built by C.S. Luney LTD for NZ$6.4 million.

The building originally had a ground floor shopping arcade, which was replaced by a Westpac branch in its later usage. In addition to the main tower, there was an inter-connected 3-storey podium building which was used for retail.

The name of the building changed after Westpac acquired Trust Bank in 1996, and phased out the brand.

In the 90s, it had two flag poles on the top of the roof, although the flags were gone by the 2000s.

=== Modern usage ===
In 2001, the interior of the building was refurbished. Westpac used the tower as its head office in the South Island until its eventual demolition. A Westpac branch was also operated on the ground floor until it closed due to earthquake damage in 2010.

In 2011, the building was owned by property investor Miles Middleton, who owned three other high-rise buildings in the Christchurch city area.

=== Earthquake damage and demolition ===
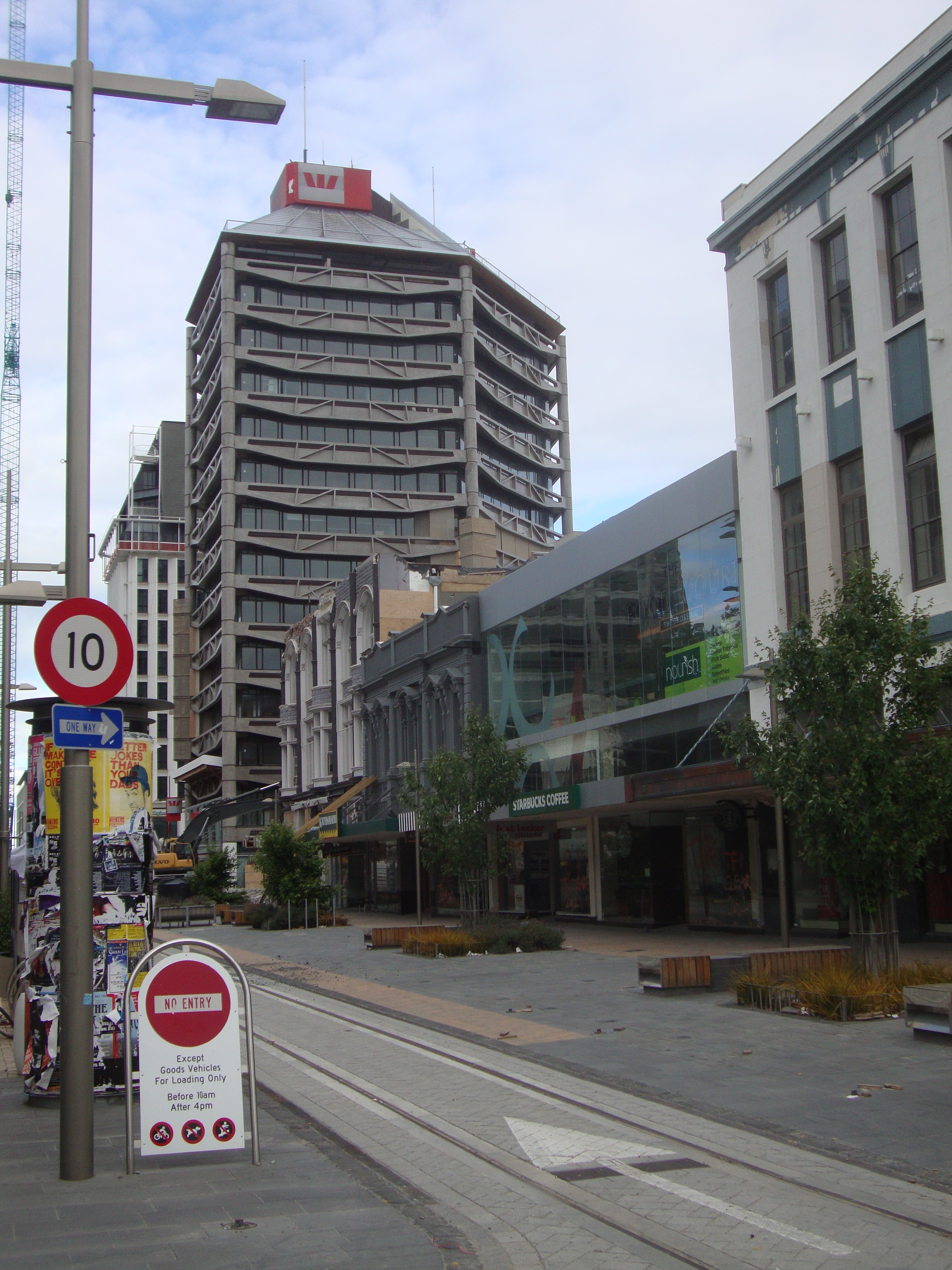
The damaged tower in 2011, seen from Cashel Street

The building suffered notable damage in the 2010 Canterbury earthquake, losing windows (particularly on the upper floors) as well as the spalling of large pieces of concrete from the outer columns and frame. Occupants were forced to vacate the building owing to safety concerns. A barricade was put around the tower for fears that more concrete could loosen and fall onto pedestrians. A report conducted by Holmes Consulting found that the building has suffered damage to the lower-level shear walls, floor slabs, and damage to the external columns and top-floor glazing.

Repairs to the building were attempted in 2010 and the tower had survived subsequent aftershocks, but it was further damaged in the 2011 Christchurch earthquake and stranded within the central area of the red zone cordon, in close proximity to other dangerous structures including the Grand Chancellor Hotel. In 2012, an inquiry conducted as part of the Canterbury Earthquake Royal Commission found that there had been continued damage to the shear walls caused by inelastic deformation of the shear core, likely exacerbated by an impact between the tower and the podium structure which caused additional damage.

Due to a number of major repair requirements needed to meet structural and seismic standards and fix the exterior and interior damage, and with the building having already reached nearly 50% of its design life, it was marked for demolition.

During the middle of May in 2012, demolition work began on the property. It took just over six months to complete. UK-based company, McGee Group, spent an estimated $120,000 importing a German-made excavator dubbed the 'Goliath' to help demolish the building. It had previously been used in the demolition of the old Wembley Stadium.

The former site of the Westpac Canterbury Centre was used to extend the retail space of The Crossing, a retail and office complex built after the earthquakes. As of 2024, the site has a 3-storey office building named ASB House, home to the regional center of ASB Bank.
