= Puaka–James Hight Building =

Building in the University of Canterbury

- Central Library | Te Puna Mātauraka (Māori)

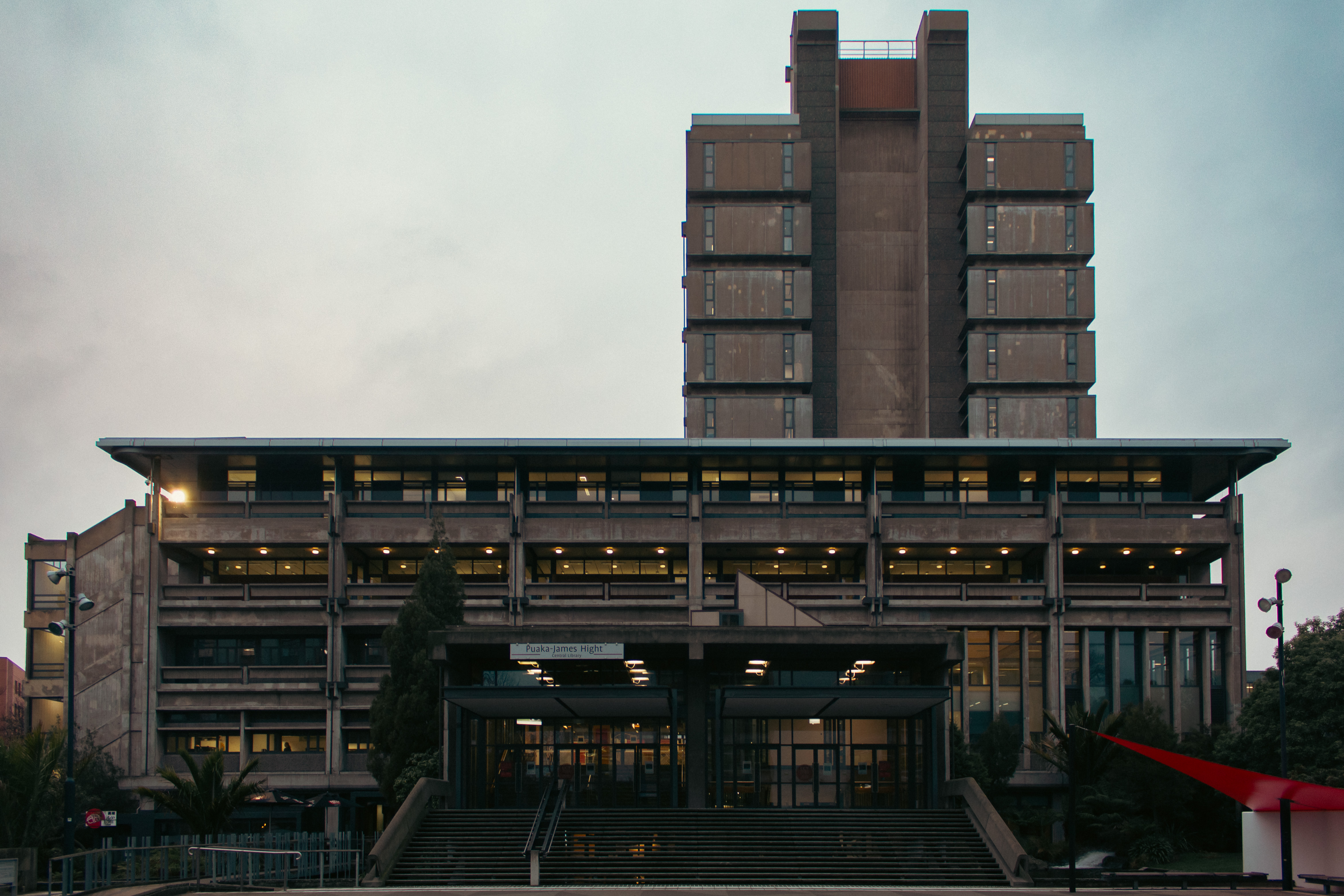
- Puaka–James Hight Building in June 2024
- Interactive map of the Puaka–James Hight Building area
- Former names: James Hight Building

General information
- Architectural style: Brutalist / Modernist
- Location: Christchurch, New Zealand
- Coordinates: 43.523513°S 172.582704°E
- Construction started: 1969
- Completed: 1974; 52 years ago
- Renovated: 2013
- Cost: NZ$3.05 million (equivalent to $61.77 million in 2023)
- Client: University of Canterbury

Height
- Height: 53 m (173 ft).

Technical details
- Structural system: Reinforced concrete
- Floor count: 11

Design and construction
- Architect: Ministry of Works
- Civil engineer: CS Luney Construction

Renovating team
- Architect: Warren and Mahoney
- Civil engineer: Hawkins NZ

The Puaka–James Hight Building is the main library building of the University of Canterbury, and houses the university's Central Library (Māori: Te Puna Mātauraka). It is named after Puaka the Māori star cluster also known as Rigel in the Orion constellation, and Sir James Hight, former, professor, and rector at Canterbury College. Rising 53-metres-tall, its distinctive brutalist design, characterised by exposed concrete, confronts the skyline and has become an enduring symbol of the institution, and the most recognisable building on campus.

Constructed in the 1970s, the Puaka–James Hight Building has witnessed numerous renovations and expansions, adapting to the evolving needs of the university community. Originally named the James Hight Building, the structure underwent a naming change with the inclusion of "Puaka" to reflect the university's relationship with the mana whenua, Ngāi Tahu. The building provides students with learning resources and study spaces as well as a communal food and services area on the ground floor.

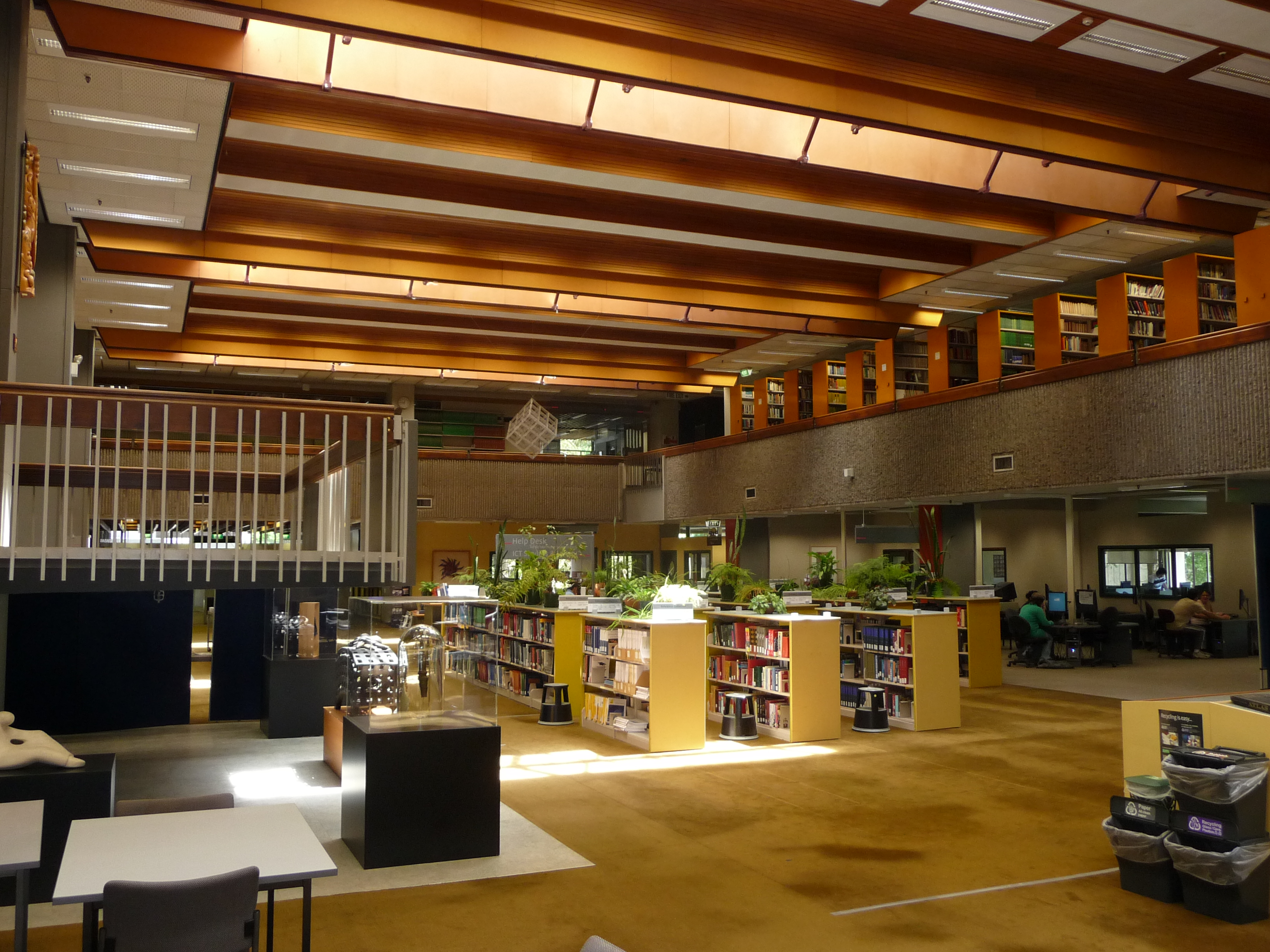
Second floor of the Puaka–James Library in 2009

== History ==
In 1963, the University Newsletter announced the appointment of the Ministry of Works as the architect for the initial phase of a comprehensive building complex at Ilam, encompassing the Arts, Library, Administration, and General facilities. By 1969, preparations were underway for the first building in the concluding phase of the university's transition from the city to the Ilam site. The Government accepted the $3,005,349 tender from Christchurch-based firm C.S. Luney Ltd. for the Library-Arts block at the end of July.

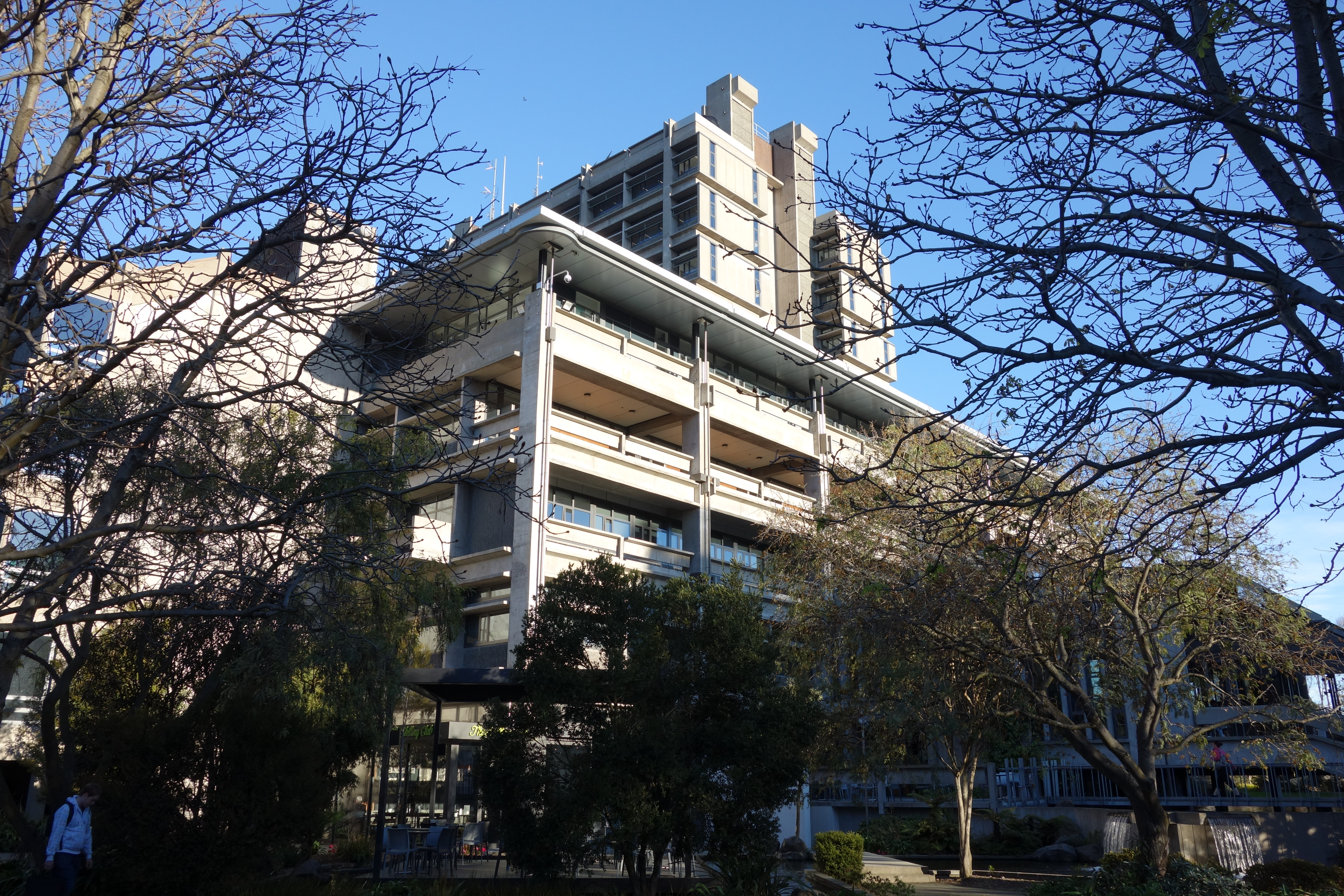

In 1970, the foundation stone for the building was laid by Governor-General Sir Arthur Porritt at a ceremony attended by approximately 300 guests. In his speech he said,

"[The laying of foundation stones gives] me a similar feeling to that one gets when a ship is launched. Today, for better or for worse, if I may mix my ceremonies, we are launching an educational ship of considerable magnitude into a sea of practical and cultural usage,"

"Most students go to University to drink from a fountain of knowledge – only a tiny minority are content merely with gargling—and what better fountain of knowledge can a University have than a library?"

On 23 March 1974, Governor-General Sir Denis Blundell officially opened the James Hight Library and arts block, heralded as New Zealand's largest university building. It was not fully completed at that time but some floors were open for use. The Library's relocation from the city site to the James Hight building commenced on 18 November 1974, with the ambitious goal of completing the move, including 180,000 books from the town site and 40,000 from the Sciences Library, by Christmas. On 20 December 1974, the university's city library closed.

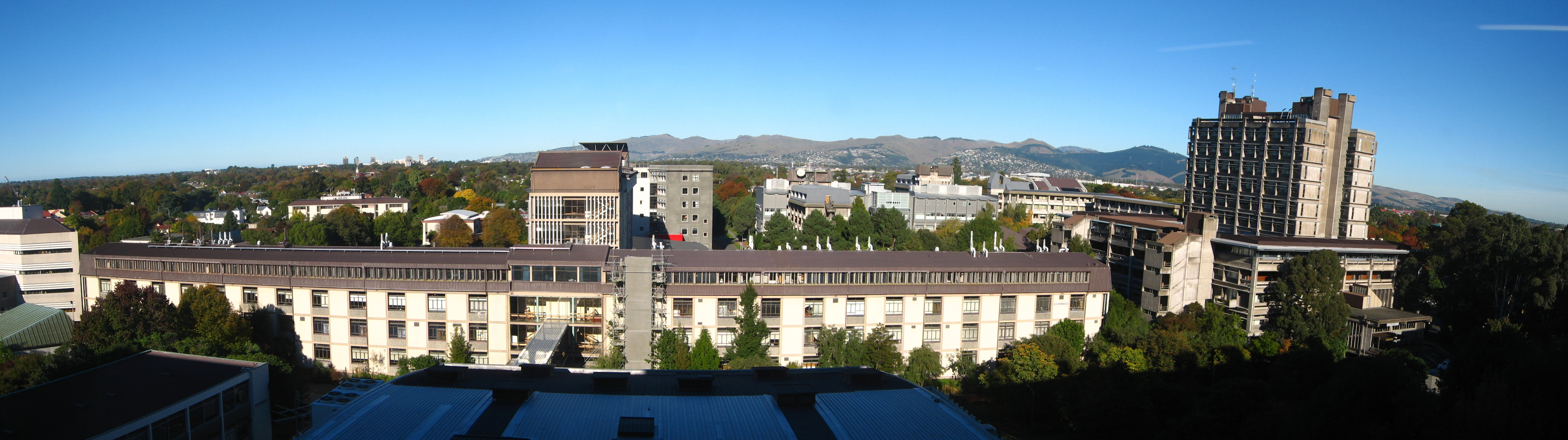
View from the Ernest Rutherford building. Puaka–James Hight Building can be seen on the right.

In 1975, the University Library occupied the bottom four levels of the building, while the Departments of Accountancy, Business Administration, Classics, Economics, Law, Philosophy, and Religious Studies were situated in the tower.

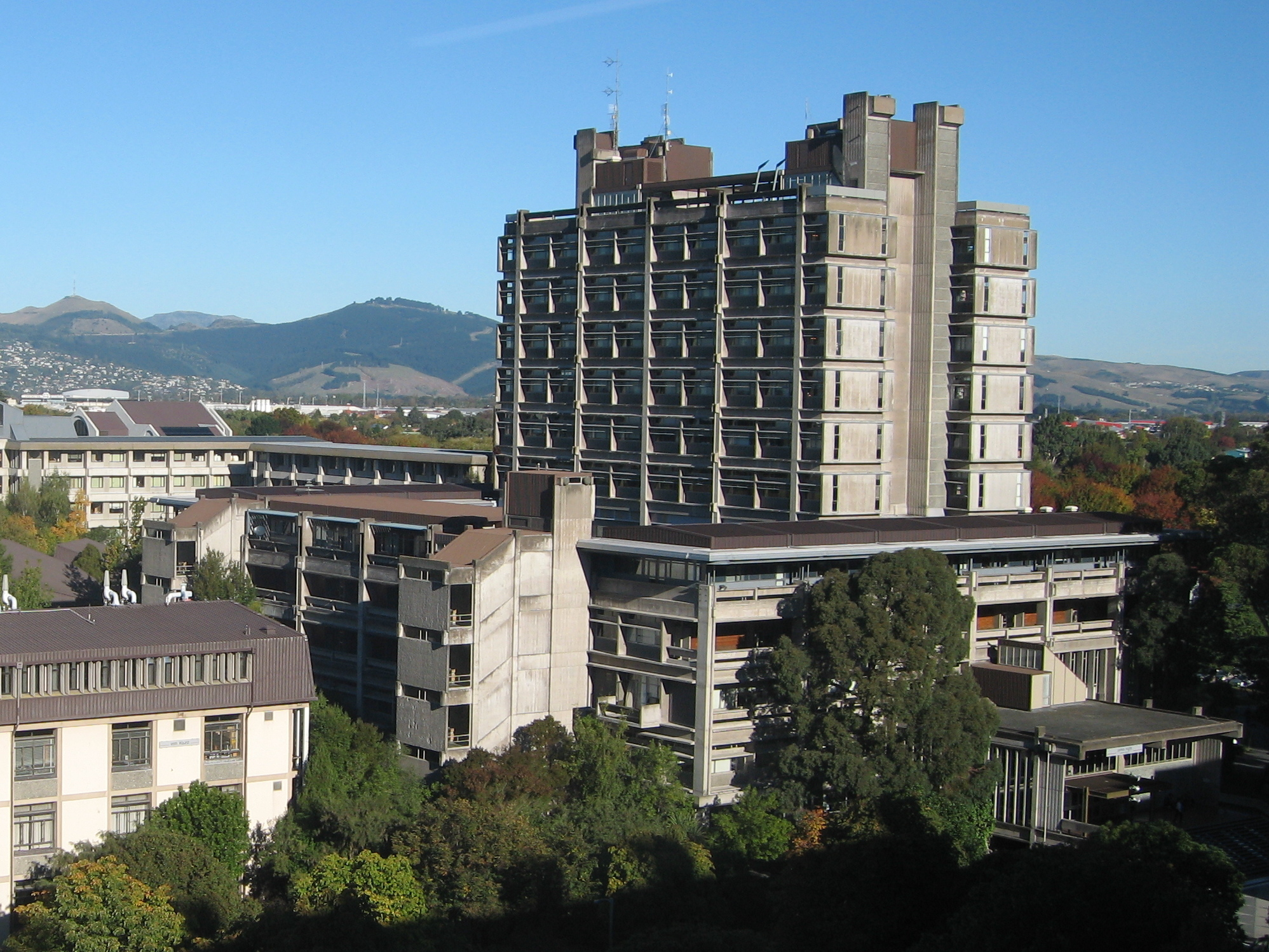

In the aftermath of the Christchurch earthquakes in 2010 and 2011, the Library suffered substantial damage to the building. The first earthquake led to the closure of the university for a week, and the library remained inaccessible for several months as efforts were dedicated to repairing shelves and reinstating half a million books to their positions.

Repairs were undertaken to address issues such as seismic joints, seismic joint connections, significant floor diaphragm cracking or spalling, and damage to shear walls, columns, beams, pre-cast panels, stair connections, as well as Tower wall panel connections. Internal partitions and ceilings were significantly affected, with some collapsing during the earthquake.

Concurrently, the university undertook betterment and capital works, involving the comprehensive replacement of windows, a shift from convector heaters to a radiator system on every floor, and an extensive refurbishment of Level 5 and the retail areas in the Undercroft on the Ground floor. The repairs and renovations were completed in 2013.

== See also ==
- List of Brutalist structures
