= James Hight =

New Zealand historian (1870–1958)

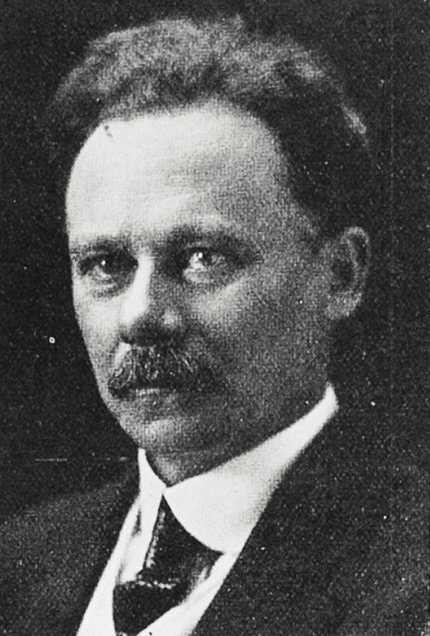
James Hight

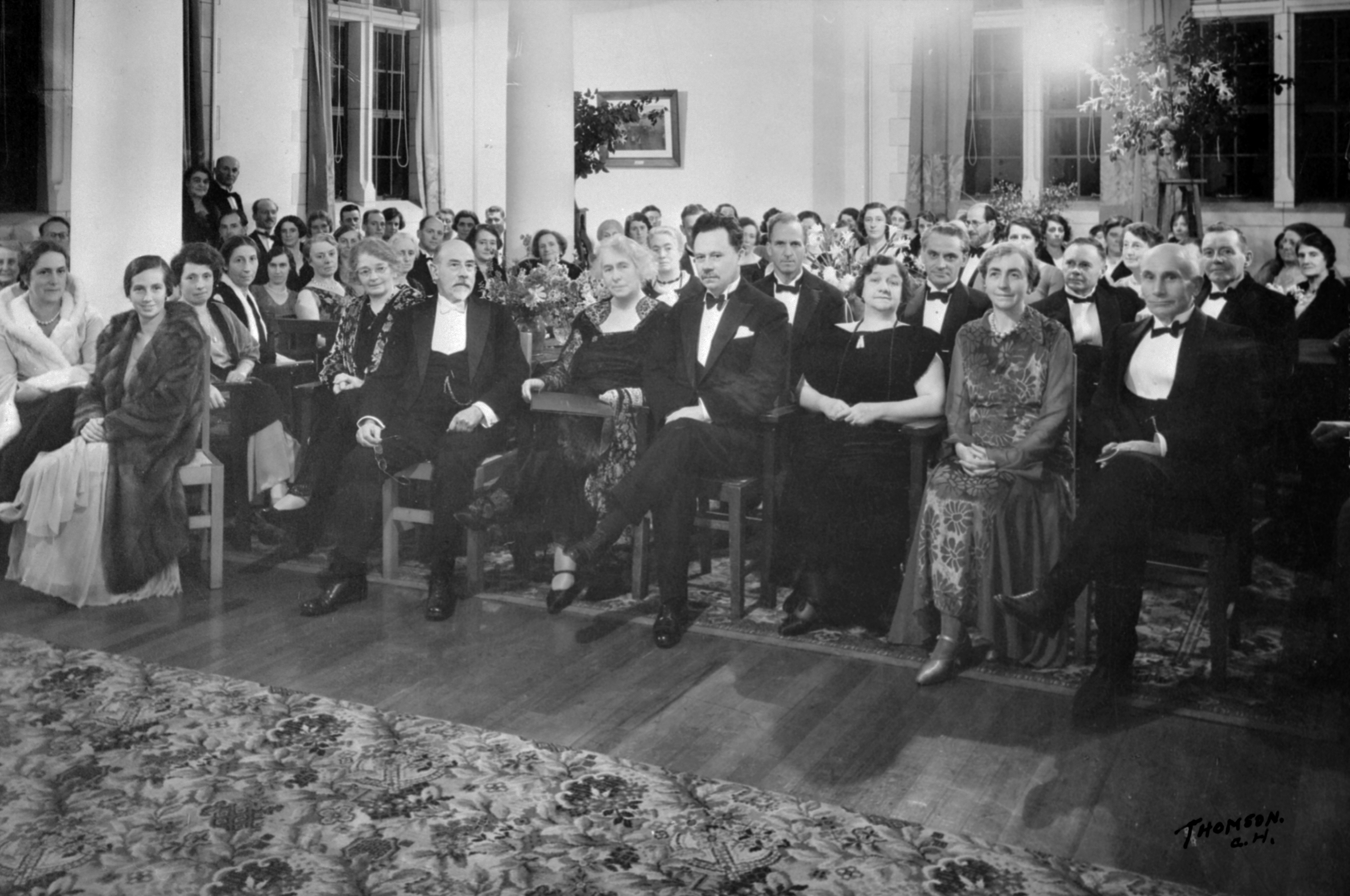
Hight at a meeting of the Society for Imperial Culture (front row; 4th from right)

Sir James Hight KBE CMG (3 November 1870 – 17 May 1958) was a New Zealand university professor, educational administrator and historian. He was born in Halswell in Christchurch, New Zealand on 3 November 1870. He died on 17 May 1958 and is buried at Linwood Cemetery.

Hight was appointed a Companion of the Order of St Michael and St George in the 1932 King's Birthday Honours. In 1935, he was awarded the King George V Silver Jubilee Medal. In the 1947 New Year Honours he was appointed a Knight Commander of the Order of the British Empire for services to education.

The central library building at the University of Canterbury is named for him.
