= Christchurch Seagull Pit =

Derelict building site in New Zealand

Seagull Pit
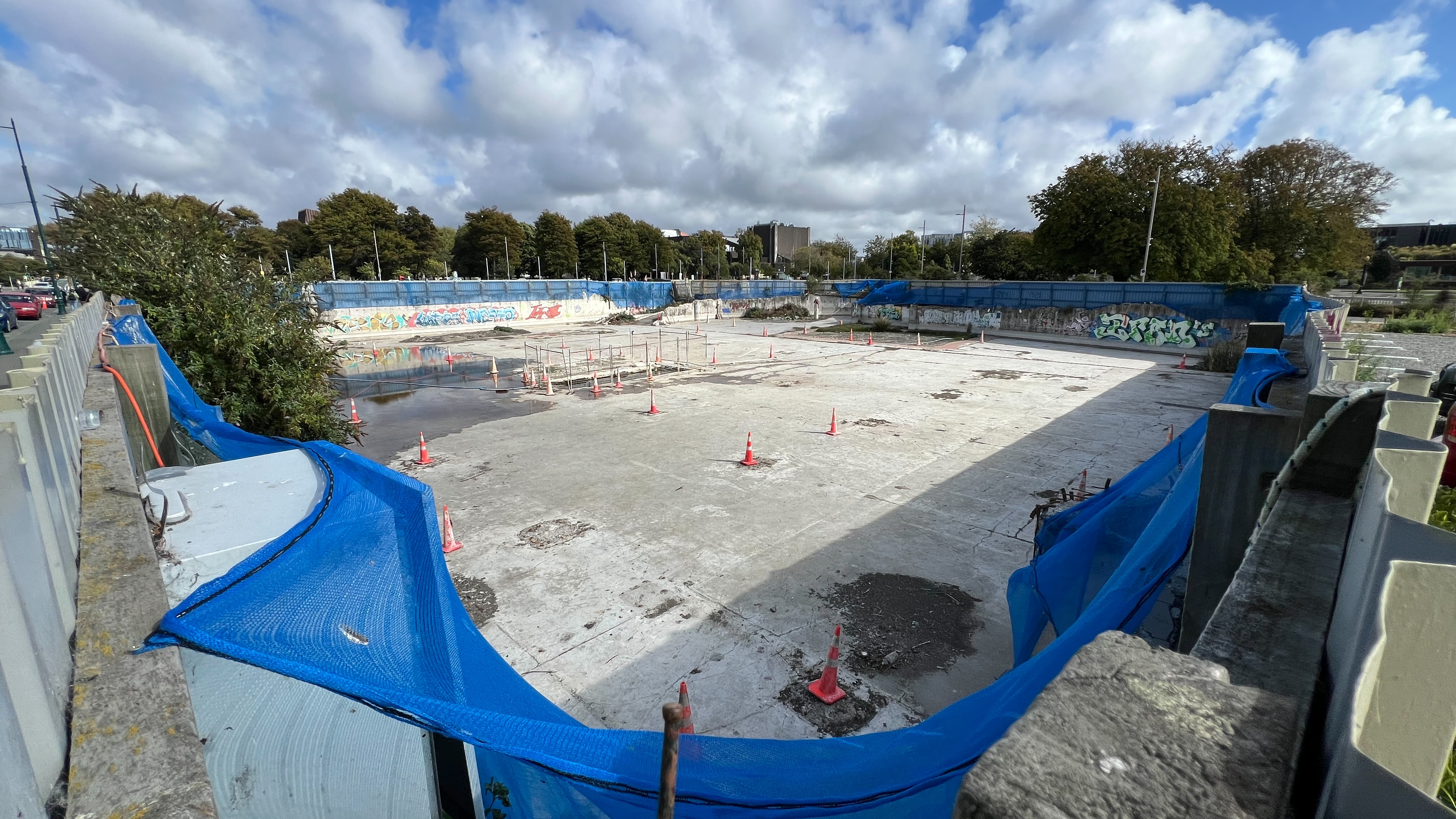
- The pit in February 2025 after being drained of water
- Owner: Carter Group
- Address: 119 Armagh Street, Christchurch Central City; New Zealand
- Location within Christchurch, New Zealand
- Coordinates: 43°31′43″S 172°38′16″E

The Seagull Pit is a derelict building site and tourist attraction on Armagh Street in the Christchurch Central City, New Zealand. The pit was formed when the derelict basement of the former PricewaterhouseCoopers Building became flooded by groundwater, attracting wild gulls that built nests there. The building had been demolished following the 2011 Christchurch earthquake.

In 2024 a Google Maps listing for the location was created, and it was described as a "tongue-in-cheek" tourist attraction in news media.

== History ==
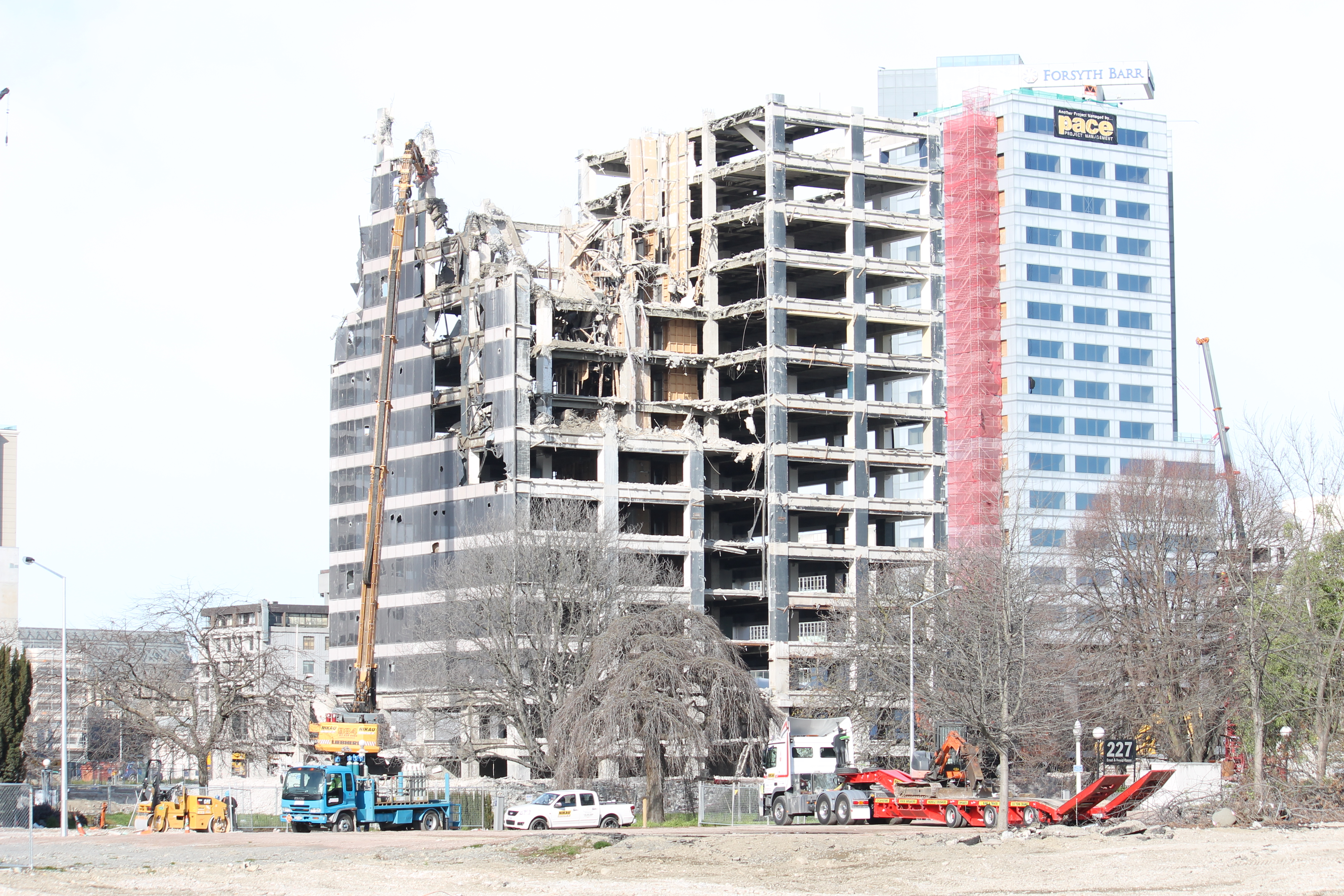
The PricewaterhouseCoopers building during demolition in September 2012

Prior to the earthquake, the site was occupied by the PricewaterhouseCoopers building. The 21-storey mixed-use commercial and retail building was constructed in 1990, and included an underground car park with 158 spaces. During the earthquakes the building sustained significant structural damage, and it was deemed too expensive to repair in October 2011. The owners were Kiwi Property Group Ltd, which also operates Northlands Shopping Centre. The group received an insurance payout. Demolition began in March 2012 using the "cut-and-crane" method.

After demolition, the site remained abandoned, and the former underground car park—now open to the weather—began to fill with water. In 2017 the Christchurch City Council designated the site as one of the so-called "Dirty 30"—a list of damaged and derelict sites that were deemed to be holding back the regeneration of the central city. By 2019 ownership had partially transferred to the Carter Group, prompting local developers to nickname it one of "Philip Carter's swimming pools". The Carter Group co-owned the site with the Roman Catholic Diocese of Christchurch who intended to construct the new Christchurch Catholic Cathedral on the site. In April 2024, it was announced that the cathedral plan had been abandoned, and the diocese would sell their share of the land.

In 2022, the Council introduced a "vacant lot differential" rate, targeted at owners of vacant or abandoned land in the central city. The differential increased rates 4.5× over the standard rate, and was intended to encourage property owners to develop the "eyesore" locations. Carter Group opposed the differential, describing it as "illegal". While the original intent was that the rate would be applied to the Armagh Street site, the abandoned and flooded basement was still technically deemed to be a building, and therefore the site was not subject to the differential rate.

== Gulls ==
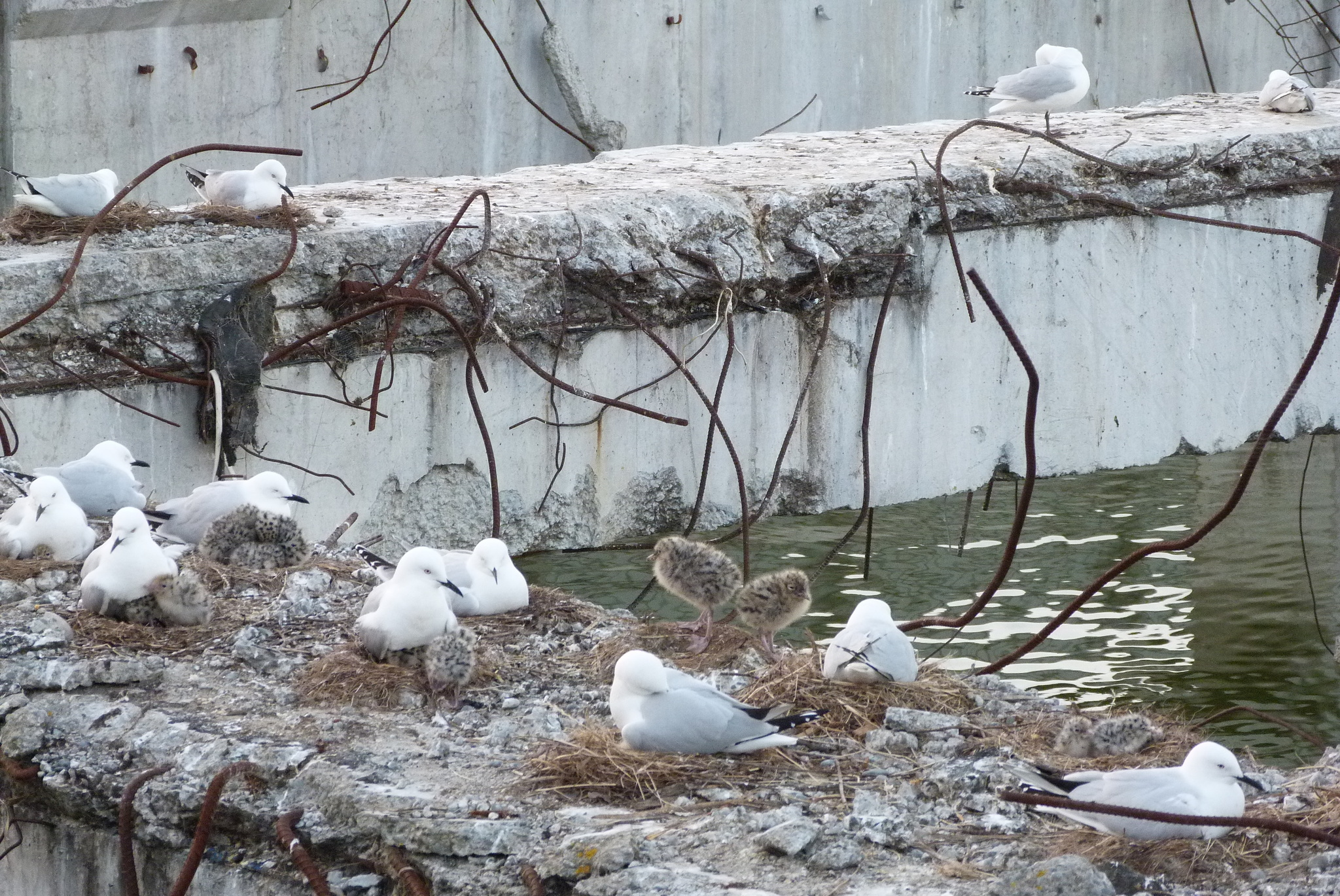
Gulls nesting in the building ruins

After flooding with water, the site began to attract red-billed gulls as well as the more endangered black-billed gull. Seagulls are protected under the Wildlife Act, and it is illegal to disturb their nesting behaviour. For this reason, once they became established at the site, they proved difficult to remove. The owners attempted to put up nets and pump out the water to discourage the birds. The birds typically nest between October and February, so during this time little could be done to remove them.

The site was not ideal for the nesting gulls, as Department of Conservation (DOC) staff had identified issues with newly hatched chicks drowning in the polluted water and sludge at the bottom of the pit. The water became polluted with droppings and chick carcasses. In the wild, the gulls nest on stoney islands and banks in the braided rivers of the Canterbury Plains. As part of efforts to relocate them, Christchurch City Council landscaped parts of the Residential Red Zone in Bexley to create more inviting habitats for them to move to.

By late 2024, efforts to clean up the site and pump out the water had been partially successful, but the gulls had instead moved to the rooftops of buildings on New Regent Street. Locals deemed the gulls a "menace", as they would swoop on bar and café patrons to steal food. Due to their protected status, nothing could be done to remove the birds. A local café owner said, "They shit everywhere. They’re also not afraid of people any more. They’ll swoop down and get food off your plate. They dive bomb. Small children don't stand a chance." After years of living in the area, the gulls had become far more bold around humans.

== Tourist attraction ==
In 2024, a Google Maps listing for the location appeared, titled "Seagull Pit" and marked as a tourist attraction. The listing showed that the pit was "open 24/7" and it had accrued a 4.5/5 star rating from users of the service. Users reviewing the location included one person who said they could "smell it and hear it long before we were close to it." In December 2024, a radio host reviewed the pit on air, describing it as the "9th wonder of the world". Google's algorithm, automated foot traffic data and "tongue-in-cheek" local users were considered possible explanations for how the listing came to exist. Writer Steve Braunias described the seagull pit as a "birdland sensation."

== Redevelopment ==
In July 2025, Carter Group applied for resource consent to build a six-storey, 28 metres (92 ft)-high commercial building on the site.

As of August 2025 the seagull pit had been converted to a car park. The vehicle ramp into the pit was refurbished and a set of stairs built to provide pedestrian access. A person was reportedly dive-bombed by a gull as they got out of their car on the first day of opening.
