= Daniel Steenstra =

- Born: 5 April 1925; Friesland, Holland
- Died: 2000 (aged 74–75)
- Occupation: Potter
- Known for: Contributions to Crown Lynn pottery
- Children: Dominicus Roland Steenstra (son)

Daniel Steenstra (5 April 1925 - 2000) practiced generational handpotting in Holland, before emigrating to New Zealand in the 1950s and executing a 20 year pottery career with Crown Lynn.

== Biography ==
Steenstra came from a long line of generational potters in Friesland, Holland where a carving-like, time consuming pottery practice called 'snywerk' is well established. He was in the third generation of potters.

In 1953, Steenstra emigrated to New Zealand with his brother Thijs. They both worked at Crown Lynn from 1954 onward, but Daniel's career with them lasted approximately 20 years. While working there he met his wife Wendy who worked in accounts.

== Career ==
He began learning to throw flower pots at 15 under the guidance of his father, later learning how to craft vases and other products. His early practice coincided with the second world war, resulting in much of it occurring whilst his family were in hiding. After the war Steenstra and his brother attempted to make and sell souvenirs pieces, but this endeavour concluded and led to them relocating to New Zealand.

After being hired by Tom Clark to start work at Crown Lynn after Clark visited Holland and met the pair, Daniel worked primarily in potting, and his brother Thijs in glazes. Daniel was hired alongside recognised potters and designers Ernest Shufflebotham, Frank Carpay, and Mirek Smíšek when Crown Lynn were looking to improve the quality of their product. Tom Clark was recorded as describing him in his opinion as "the sharpest, smartest thrower you ever saw in your life." Steenstra was known to also collaborate on occasion with Crown Lynn designer Dave Jenkin, especially when creating the shape of pieces.

Steenstra was most well known for his vases, often single colour glazed or featuring decoration by himself or other Crown Lynn designers. It was common for some of the Crown Lynn artists to travel nationally, and he did to show the company's work at various exhibitions, especially the relatively new practice of hand potting. He also did public demonstrations with the easier throwing medium of brick clay, notably at shops like Milne & Choyce Queen Street, and the Crown Lynn shop on Queen Street.

The 1960s saw mechanical methods take over the necessity for handpotting. Despite this Steenstra worked at Crown Lynn until the beginning of the 1970s, and then moved on to work for other pottery firms Beach Artware, Peter Lowrie Pottery, and Terra Ceramics.

== Legacy ==
Steenstra retired from pottery in 1992, and died in 2000.

His son Dominicus Roland Steenstra has written a biography on him entitled Just a Slip of the Hands: Daniel Steenstra, Professional Potter and Craftsman.
