= Dave Jenkin =

New Zealand ceramics designer

David "Dave" Jenkin (5 May 1919 – 2002) was a New Zealand ceramics designer best known for his role as head designer at Crown Lynn Potteries Ltd during the mid-20th century. He played a leading part in developing New Zealand’s industrial ceramics and domestic tableware design.

== Career ==
Jenkin studied at the Elam School of Art in 1943 and 1944, and being hired by Tom Clark joined the Amalgamated Brick and Pipe Company (Ambrico) in 1945. In 1948, when the company adopted the name Crown Lynn Potteries, he was appointed head of a newly established design department where he broadened design choices within the company up until he retired in 1979. His early work shows the English pottery influences within New Zealand brick work at the time, and many lasting Crown Lynn designs can be accredited to Jenkin, such as the swan figures, railway cups and mixing bowls.

With guidance from his aunt, the potter Briar Gardner, Jenkin initially experimented with glaze effects and helped develop Crown Lynn’s distinctive trickle-glaze technique. This method was used to decorate vases and small model animals which involved coating in a base glaze then trickling another colour over the top or adding further colours. Jenkin also travelled and took note of pottery designs and factories in Scandinavia, Germany and Japan as inspiration for his work. He oversaw the recruitment of European émigré designers and potters, including Frank Carpay, Mirek Smisek and Ernest Shufflebotham, who introduced a range of new decorative styles and forms. His work from 1959 onwards incorporated the company's new Murray Curvex machine, allowing for highly patterned pieces to be made for which Jenkin designed multiple patterns for.

Designers such as Mark Cleverley from 1968, worked under Jenkin in the studio, which was responsible for popular ranges including Earthstone in the late 1970s.

== Legacy and archives ==
Jenkin’s individual contributions were not always credited by name, but his influence is widely acknowledged in histories of New Zealand design. His work is represented in the collections of the Museum of New Zealand Te Papa Tongarewa, the Auckland War Memorial Museum, and Te Toi Uku – Crown Lynn & Clayworks Museum.

The National Library of New Zealand holds extensive Crown Lynn archives, including studio records that document Jenkin’s design leadership and the work of his colleagues. His career and the wider significance of Crown Lynn ceramics have been discussed in design histories, exhibitions and academic conferences.

=== Selected designs ===
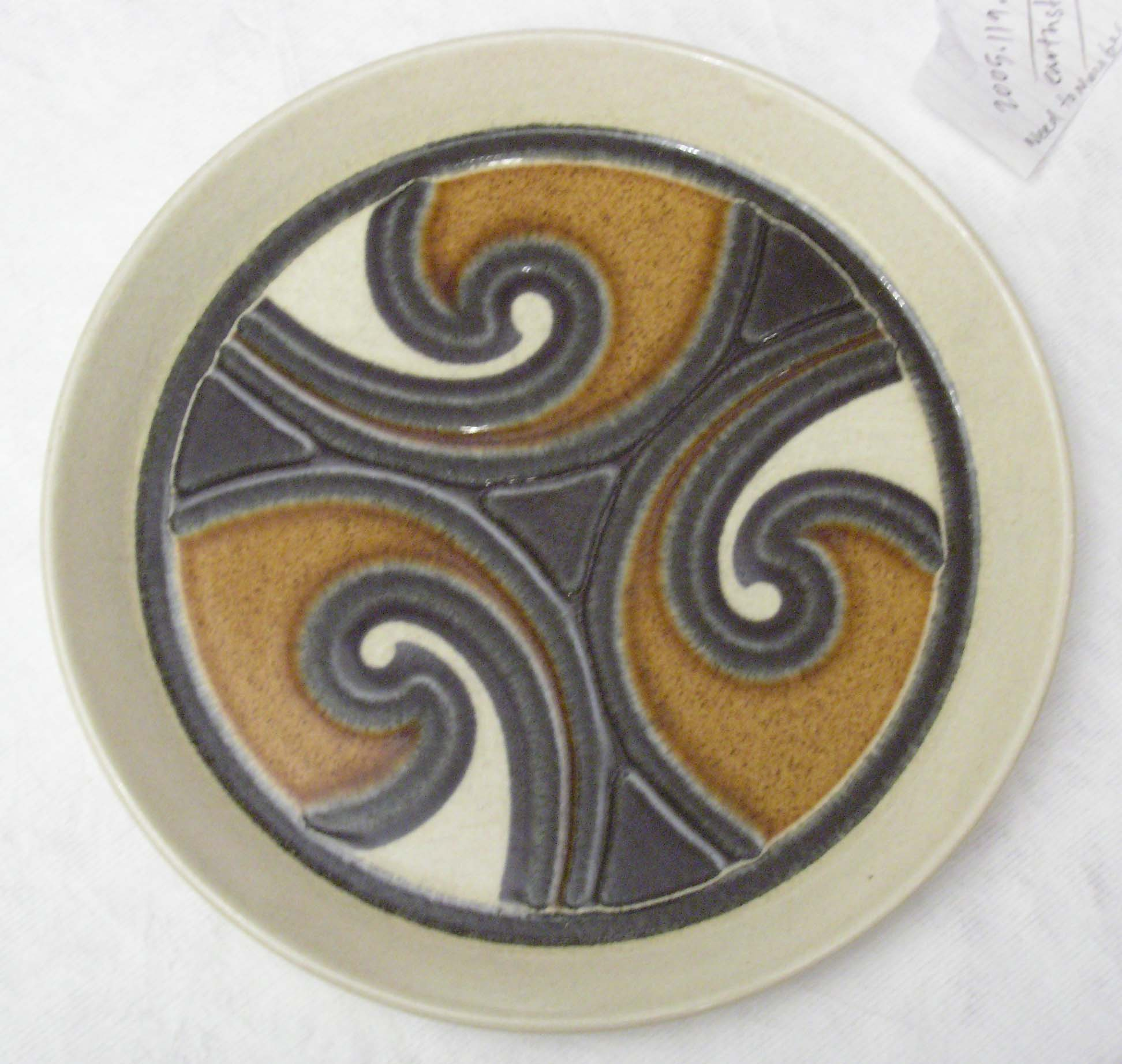
Polynesia (from the Earthstone range) is a pattern attributed to Jenkin (Auckland Museum collection)

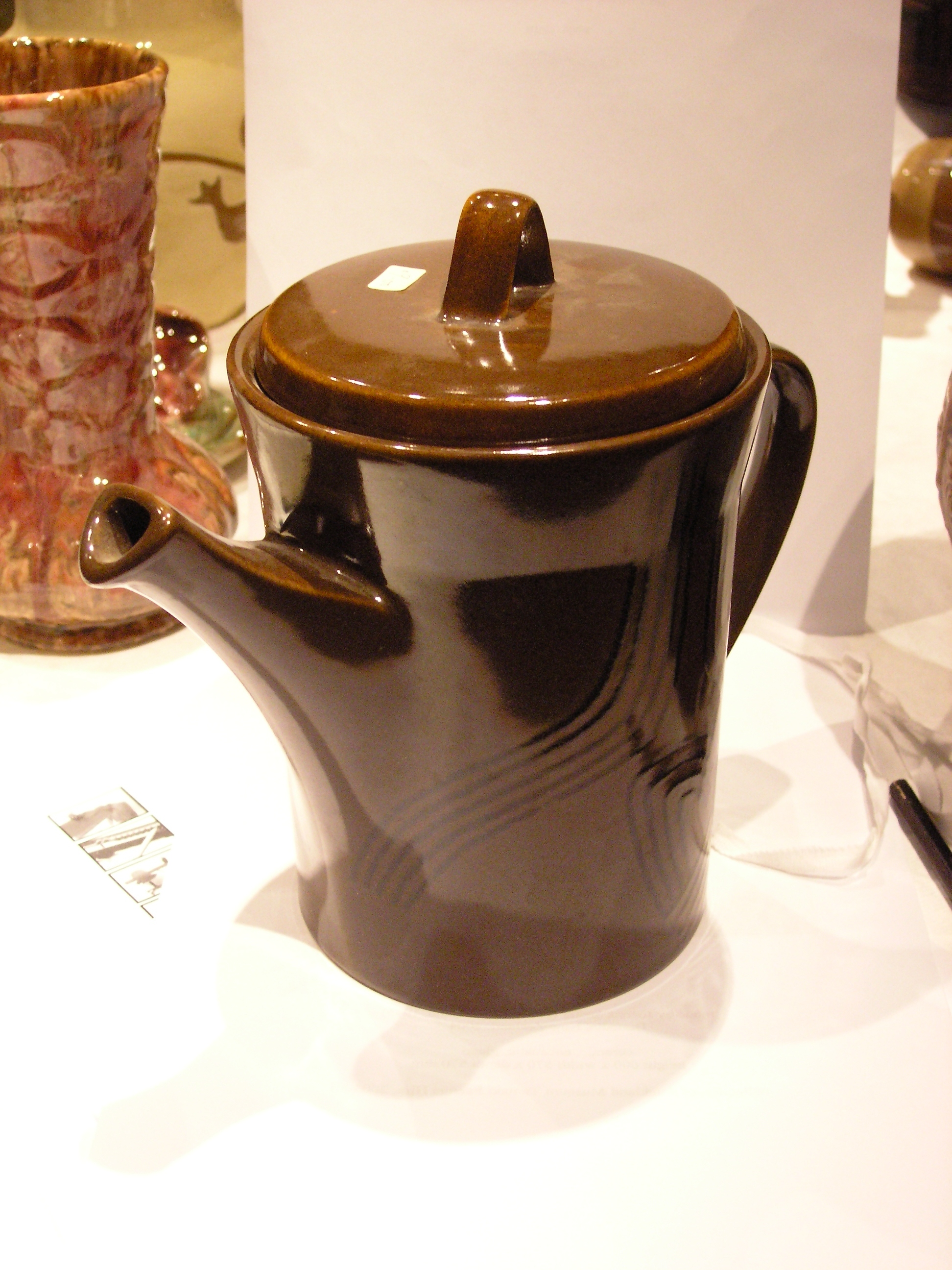
Coffee pot (and matching ware) were designed by Jenkin design in 1977 for use at Bellamy's restaurant at Parliament. (Auckland Museum collection)
