= Crum Brick, Tile and Pottery Company =

New Zealand brick company

Crum Brick, Tile and Pottery Company Ltd.
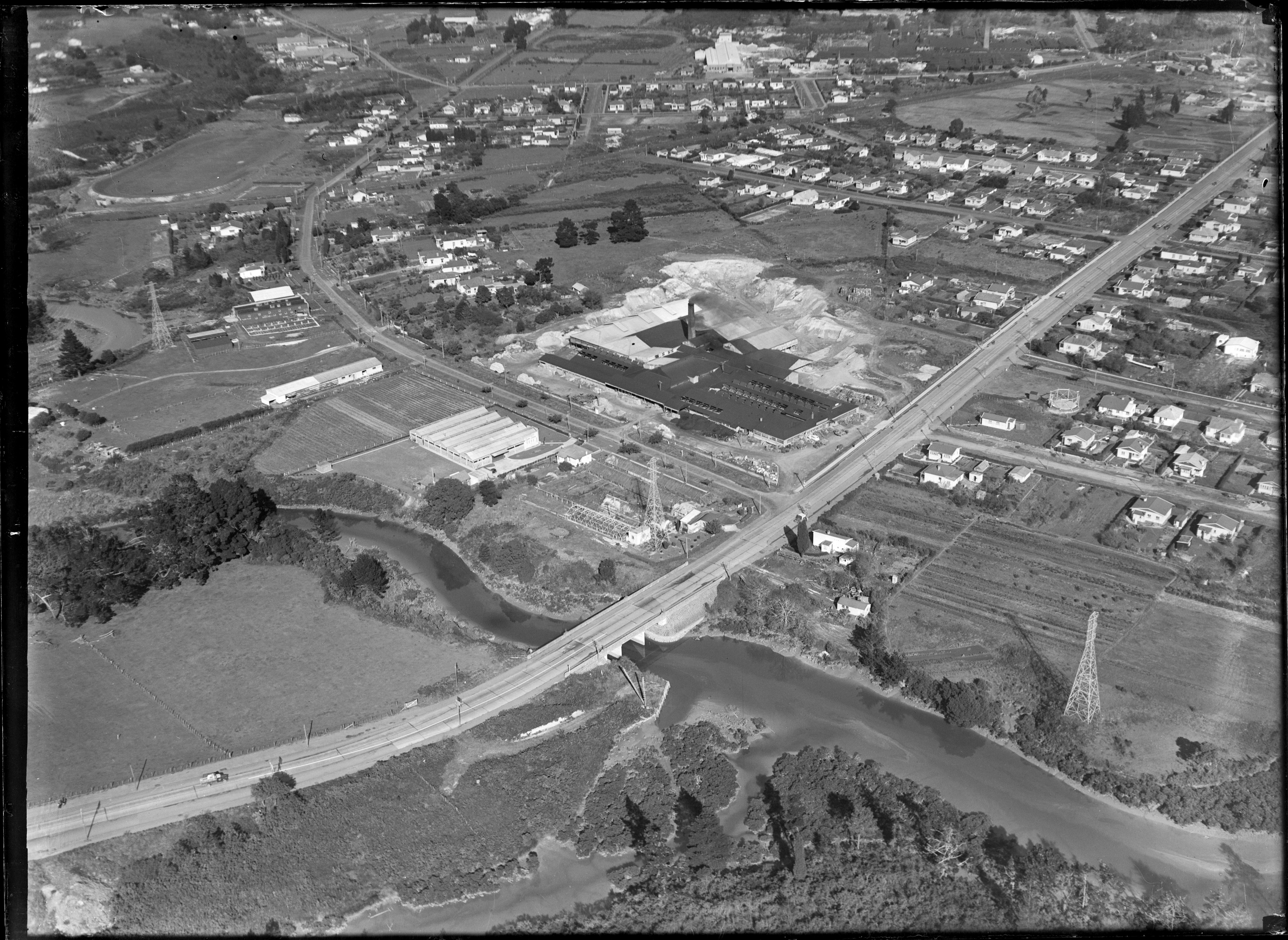
- View of Crum Brick, Tile & Pottery Company factory at New Lynn with clay excavation behind, with Great North Road and Portage Road junction in foreground, Auckland City.
- Formation: October 14, 1929; 96 years ago
- Dissolved: 1975
- Headquarters: New Lynn
- Services: Brickmaking, tile manufacturing, pottery
- Owner: Albert Crum (1929-1975)

The Crum Brick, Tile and Pottery Company Ltd. was founded by Albert Crum and his sons on 14 October 1929 in New Lynn, West Auckland. The site remained functional as a brickwork firm until the late 1970s.

== History ==
=== Albert Crum ===
Albert Crum (1863-1951), son to John Crum (1834-1918), was born in the Forest of Dean, Gloucestershire, and reportedly immigrated to New Zealand with his family in 1878. Together they arrived in Port Lyttleton on Christmas Eve via the Marlborough, and later moved to Ashburton. Albert Crum originally worked in brickmaking and building in Ashburton, Canterbury, joining his father in masonry and concrete work in October 1892. Shortly after in 1895, the father and son bought Kolmar Brickworks Ashburton from the Messrs Friedlander brothers and began producing pressed building bricks, various pipes, chimney and flower pots, tiles, and so on. Eventually Kolmar became Ashburton Brickworks, which continued to bring the Crum family success.

=== NZ Brick, Tile and Pottery Company (1905-1929) ===
Albert relocated to Auckland in October 1905 opening the NZ Brick, Tile and Pottery Company in New Lynn in a managerial position alongside Hugo Friedlander. The initial setup involved financial admin, paying the workers already there and organising more equipment. Later in November the last partners gave up their lease and the business was officially sold to Crum and Friedlander. The company's land was first built on by Charles Thomson, John Gardner, and R O (Tonks) Gardner in 1903 who deemed it 'the No. 4 site,' but after the death of Charles Gardner in January 1905, the split control of the shares of the then Thompson & Gardner Brick and Tile Company resulted in Crum and Friedlander's 1905 negotiations and eventual purchase.

The land of the West Auckland site of NZ Brick, Tile and Pottery situated on Rankin Avenue also incorporated 19 acres of a farm bought by Auckland bookbinder John Foley, which operated from the 1860s until 1893. Other sections obtained included 35 acres on Astley Avenue by 1906, and 10 acres on Clark Street before the 1920s. The company was left with the prior brickwork's kiln, 128,000 green pre-fired bricks, and other equipment. Although, to establish the business, the pair received assistance from Ashburton colleagues such as Reid and Gray who supplied boilers for the business in September 1905, and Hugh Sargeant Barrett who was employed in 1908 as one of their engineers. Primary newspapers reported the arrival of equipment from America too. In December 1905, Crum ordered a brick press reading 'Crum' from Brightside Foundry and Engineering Co Ltd in Sheffield, Yorkshire.

In February 1906, Mr E Hartley, former President of the Auckland Branch of the Architects' Institute, published his concerns about the quality of Auckland-made bricks of the time. Friedlander responded to the institute that same month, assuring them that the NZ Brick, Tile & Pottery Company in New Lynn would soon be established enough to resolve this. Their success proved true as Crum continued to manage the company for 25 years, offering a range of bricks, tiles and piping broader than any company in the North Island at the time. A notable implementation of Crum's was using salt glazed bricks in fireplaces, and these were used in the construction of Auckland Boys Grammar School.

In May 1906, a boiler malfunctioned causing injury of a worker named Robert Ezzy, who later passed, and a supervising engineer named John Colinshaw, who suffered facial injuries. This resulted in a call for funds for a chimney shaft in July that year.

By 1907, the New Lynn site covered 73 acres of land and utilised clay 150 ft below ground. It was also reported by Progress that one plastic system machine could craft 100,000 bricks per day, and the kiln had a limit of 30,000 to 40,000 pieces a day. By July 1908, fire bricks and tiles, glazed drain pipes, and farmers field tiles were being made and sold by the company, with some being through their agent, S Kohn, located in Fort Street.

=== Auckland Brickmakers Association (second ed.) ===
The association was established in 1910 as a registered limited company, and they set the price of bricks of member firms correlating with workers' awards. The group also controlled the output processes of many brick firms including NZ Brick Tile and Pottery. The association closed at the end of 1920.

Shareholders
Location	Name	Occupation
Auckland	William Elkin Hutchinson	Contractor
	Lemuel John Bagnall	Merchant
	Joseph James Craig	
Auckland	John Thomas Julian	Contractor (stand-in director for Hugo Friedlander)
New Lynn	Charles Fisher Gardner	
Henderson	James Shaw & Robert Laurie	Brickmakers
Avondale	Archibald brothers	

=== World War I ===
Being a British citizen, Albert Crum wasn't discriminated against during the first world war, but Friedlander and his family back in Ashburton were targeted and had their businesses shut down post-war. The brick trade firms also decreased during the war as a result of conscription. J T Julian suggested that NZ Brick, Tile and Pottery continued to make 20,000 'fancy' bricks each day, avoiding producing common bricks per request of the Gardner brothers' firm.

1919 Figures
Firm	Brick Quantity
NZ Brick, Tile and Pottery	600,000
Gardner's	620,000
JJ Craig (Avondale)	600,000
Lauries'	160,000
Archibald's	64,000

In 1923 a segment of the Rankin Avenue section became solely owned by Albert Crum. It has been posed that he may have lived there due to records of smaller buildings being on that land until 1959.

In 1925 Thomas Edwin Clark of R O Clark Ltd (Hobsonville) became a shareholder and managing director of NZ Brick, Tile and Pottery. Prior to this Crum and Friedlander were the only major shareholders and company name NZ Brick, Tile and Pottery was not registered. The old partnership liquidated in order to take on new shareholders, but discovered their registration had been blocked. An original and separate NZ Brick, Tile and Pottery Company, founded in Christchurch in 1886, had not formally liquidated despite having stopped all works prior to the 20th century. However, the Christchurch registration office resolved this officially in July 1925 approving the transfer of the name to Crum and Friedlander. Registration of the company with its new shareholders occurred in April 1926.

=== Crum Brick, Tile and Pottery Company Ltd. (1929-1975) ===
The Amalgamated Brick & Tile, and Brick & Pipe Company Ltd arose in 1929, subsequently causing the decline of NZ Brick, Tile and Pottery. Albert Crum was a shareholder of both until the late 1930s. The Crum Brick, Tile and Pottery Company was founded by Albert Crum on 14 October 1929 when Auckland's brick industry unified. The company's shareholders consisted of Crum's sons, Colin Crum, Jack Albert Crum, Gordon Albert Crum, and Harry Albert Crum.

In October 1929, New Lynn locals protested the location choice of the new company to the council, suggesting that its placement at the 'gateway of New Lynn' would decrease land value and cause upset among residents over time. Crum disagreed with the remarks, and mentioned that if the New Lynn location wasn't approved it would be built near Whau Creek in Avondale. The main site was approved and was on the corner of Portage and Great North Road in New Lynn, West Auckland.

In 1931, Crum Brick, Tile and Pottery created a new slotted brick which was used for repairs after the earthquake in Hawkes Bay. Each brick had a slot in its centre which enabled a steel rod to be passed through it, thus reinforcing the wall being constructed. The reinforcing rods could also be inserted after the bricks were laid. Once inserted, the rods were enclosed in cement and protected from the air. The bricks were lighter than traditional solid bricks.

New Lynn remained its home from 1929 until 1975 when the company was bought out by Ceramco. Primary photos show the process of the site being destroyed in the 1980s although it has been recorded that work finished in the late 1970s.

=== Amalgamated Brick & Tile and Brick & Pipe companies (1929-1989) ===
In August 1929, the Auckland and Wellington Brick & Tile and Brick & Pipe companies conjoined and became Consolidated Brick and Pipe Investments Ltd (the parent company to the New Lynn brickworks for 60 years). T E Clark senior was their first managing director. This amalgamation of firms occurred during the 1920s recession and 1930s depression. Due to these events 100 workers were laid off in 1931 originally from the former NZ Brick and Tile firm, and the Gardner firm closed.

Between March 1935 and February 1936 the Amalgamated Brick and Pipe company did a free plan scheme for multiple brick homes categorised as being worth less than 900 pounds. Additionally the Gardner firm was reopened in July 1935.

== Legacy ==
A large proportion of West Auckland's ceramic histories, including that of Crum Brick, Tile and Pottery are exhibited and archived by Crown Lynn Te Toi Uku Museum.

Information about Crum Brick, Tile and Pottery, and the companies prior are also held in various Auckland heritage collections and archives.

Artefact and documentary collections of Crum (New Zealand Brick Tile and Pottery Company Ltd) are held by Auckland Museum Tāmaki Paenga Hira.

Photographs of Crum Brickworks and other West Auckland brickwork firms are held in Auckland Council Libraries' J. T. Diamond Collection and Alexander Turnbull National Library Collection. Digital NZ hold relevant photographs in their Kura Heritage Collections Online.
