= Crown Lynn =

New Zealand ceramics manufacturer

Crown Lynn Potteries Limited
- Industry: Pottery
- Founded: 1929; Incorporated on 29 March 1949
- Defunct: Factory closed in 1989; Removed on 5 August 1993
- Headquarters: New Lynn, Auckland, New Zealand
- Key people: Tom Clark, Ernest Shufflebotham, Dave Jenkin, Frank Carpay, Mirek Smisek

Crown Lynn Potteries Limited was a New Zealand ceramics manufacturer based in New Lynn, Auckland. Operating between 1929 and 1989, it grew from the Amalgamated Brick and Pipe Company (Ambrico) into the largest producer of domestic pottery in the Southern Hemisphere. At its height the factory employed over 650 staff, produced up to 17 million pieces annually, and exported to Australia, the Pacific Islands, Asia and North America.

Although the factory closed in 1989 amid growing competition from imported tableware and changes in the New Zealand economy, Crown Lynn is noted as an enduring design icon. Its products are represented in major museum collections, in both Auckland Museum and Te Papa. Its history is preserved at Te Toi Uku – Crown Lynn & Clayworks Museum in New Lynn.

== Early history ==
The pottery's origins started with an 1854 land purchase at Hobsonville, near Auckland, by Rice Owen Clark. The land, originally planned for agricultural use, was too heavy with clay that it needed draining. To drain his land, Clark made his own pipes by wrapping logs with clay and firing them with charcoal. This first production led to his making pipes for his neighbours, and by the 1860s he had a thriving pipeworks. His success encouraged a number of others to form similar small companies. Clark imported equipment from England to meet the demand. Clark's son, Rice Owen Clark II, joined the business in 1876 and helped it grow further. By the 1880s Clark's Potteries had an office on Customs Street in Auckland and its own barge for transport. The depression in 1888 resulted in the shut down of most other Hobsonville potteries, but Clark's remained open due to focusing on drain pipes. By 1898 it was believed to have been the largest pottery works in New Zealand. Clark's Potteries continued to grow under Rice Owen Clark III and Thomas Edwin Clark, having agreement with two Auckland potteries and absorbing local competition in Hobsonville. In 1908 the company was incorporated as R.O. Clark Ltd.

=== Amalgamated Brick and Pipe Company & AMBRICO ===
The amalgamation began in 1927 when Albert Crum's New Zealand Brick Tile and Pottery Company (established in 1905) was purchased by Thomas Edwin Clark. In 1929, various West Auckland pottery producers such as; Gardner Brothers and Parker (New Lynn, established in 1902), Carder Brothers (Hobsonville), Glenburn Fireclay and Pottery Company (Avondale) and Archibald Brothers (Avondale) merged with R.O. Clark (Hobsonville) and New Zealand Brick Tile and Pottery Company (New Lynn) to become the Amalgamated Brick and Pipe Company.

In 1930 Thomas (Tom) Edwin Clark II (great - grandson of R.O. Clark I) joined the family business at age fourteen where he started as a labourer. He was later responsible for diversifying the company to produce tiles, electrical goods and rubber items to counter its vulnerability during the Depression. The Porcelain specials department or 'Specials Department' was formed to experiment new ideas for the company. They began to look into the viability of producing tableware from New Zealand clays, for the New Zealand market, leading to the establishment of Crown Lynn Potteries in 1948 (previously trading as AMBRICO).

== 1940s ==
=== World War II ===
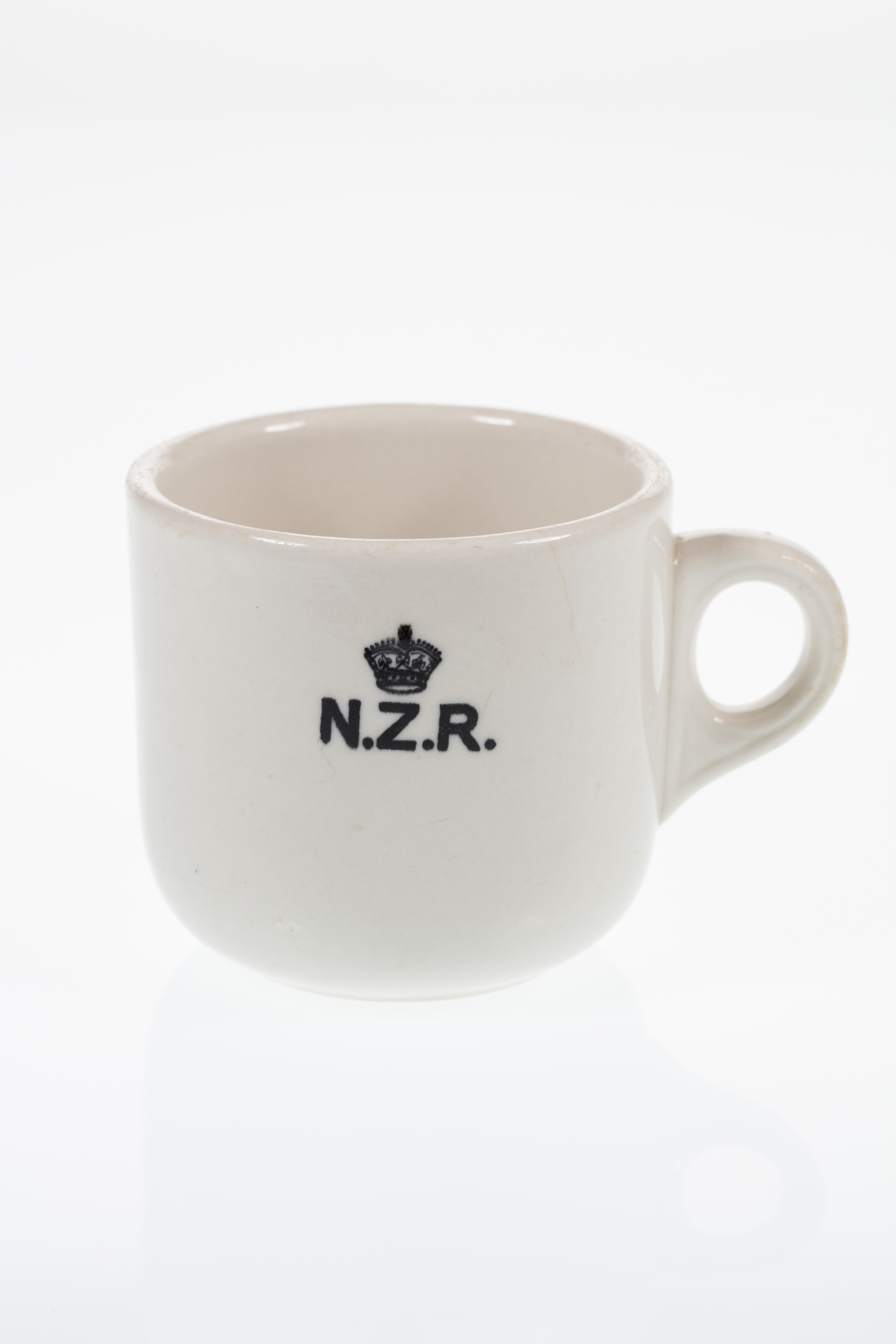
New Zealand Railways cup (black transfer). Collections of Auckland Museum.

After the outbreak of World War II in 1939, only essential goods were imported into New Zealand, so the importation of crockery from Britain halted. The Amalgamated Brick and Pipe Company became the only domestic manufacturer able to produce household goods. In order to keep up with the demand during wartime, staff created a jigger which was completely hand-operated. This process was faster than slip casting and allowed staff to produce domestic ware at a much larger scale. By 1941 the addition of an oil-fired continuous tunnel kiln had expanded the production of tableware such as cups, bowls, plates, hot water bottles, chamber pots, vases and electric jugs. As well as items unrelated to the building trade such as electrical insulation equipment and moulds for rubber products such as gloves, baby bottle teats and condoms.

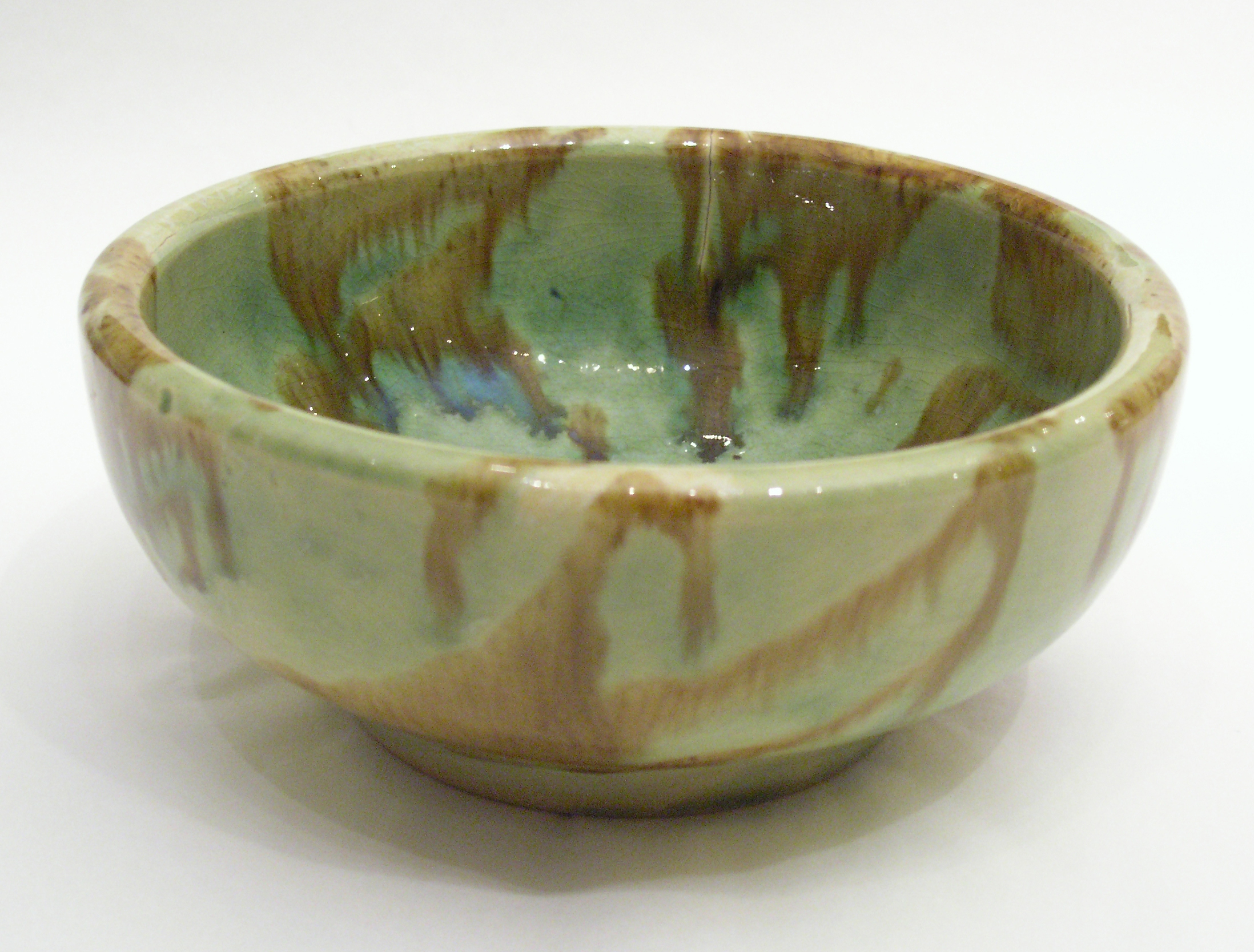
Bowl supplied for American Army. Collections of Auckland Museum.

In 1943, under a directive from the wartime Ministry of Supply, the company produced tens of thousands of mugs, plates and bowls for American troops stationed in New Zealand and the Pacific Islands. This built their reputation of making durable quality products and led to a contract with the New Zealand Railways Department to produce tableware. Due to their make up of vitrified porcelain, the N.Z.R. cups became renowned for their solidity, with passengers developing a tradition to try smash their empty cups by throwing them out the train window. Several slightly varying designs of the N.Z.R. cup were made over the years and it is now considered a twentieth-century Kiwiana icon in the country's design history.

During the company's early period, Tom Clark would often visit his aunt Briar Gardner to ask for advice on ceramic production. Gardner was one of New Zealand's first studio potters, and the sister of the Gardner brothers who set up Gardner Bros & Parker Co. in 1903. Other women were hired in administration roles in the factory and later on the factory floor. The factory employed 36 women and eight men, by late 1942.

=== Post WWII ===
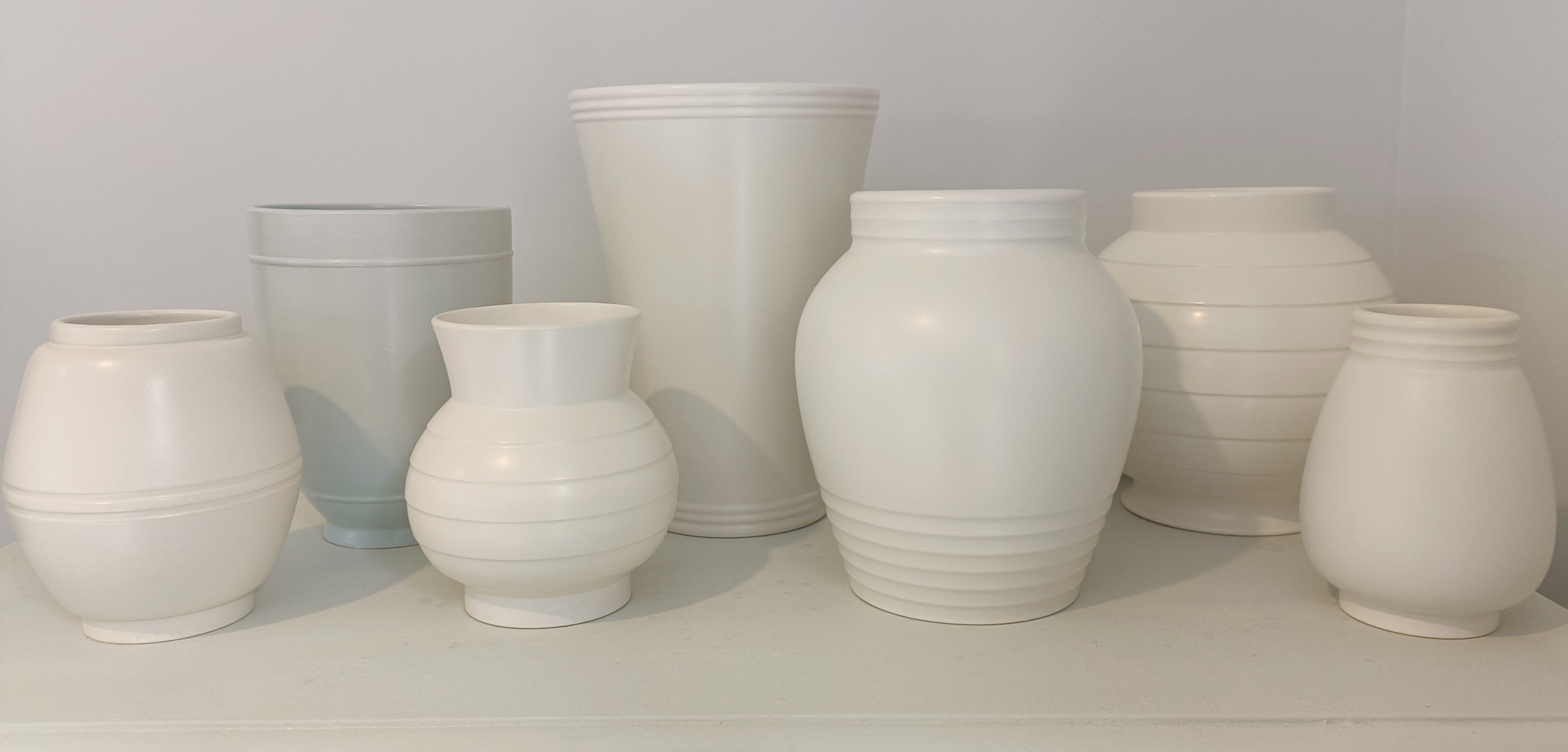
Selection of vases attributed to Ernest Shufflebotham during his time at Crown Lynn.

Crown Lynn Potteries Ltd was established in 1948 (formerly the 'specials department' of Amalgamated Brick and Pipe Company). The name 'Crown' was chosen by Clark as a reference to high quality goods and connections to England while, 'Lynn' referenced the suburb of New Lynn where the factory was located.

Post WWII, the company began to experiment with designs and diversify production. Moving away from a purely utilitarian focus, they adopted modernised designs of tableware and art pottery to cater to post war consumerism and materialism. Some of these decorative pieces included Toby mugs, model animals and the distinctive swan vase, which remained popular and in production from 1948-1970.

In 1948 Tom Clark employed Ernest Shufflebotham, an English potter who had been trained by Keith Murray. Among Shufflebotham's notable designs of the time were the 'hand-potted' range of vases, made for the popular domestic art of floral arranging. At the same time the factory laboratory discovered that the use of a halloysitic clay from Matauri Bay helped increased the fired whiteness of the body. This enabled Crown Lynn to mass-produce tableware decorated with transfers, and coloured tableware.

== 1950s ==
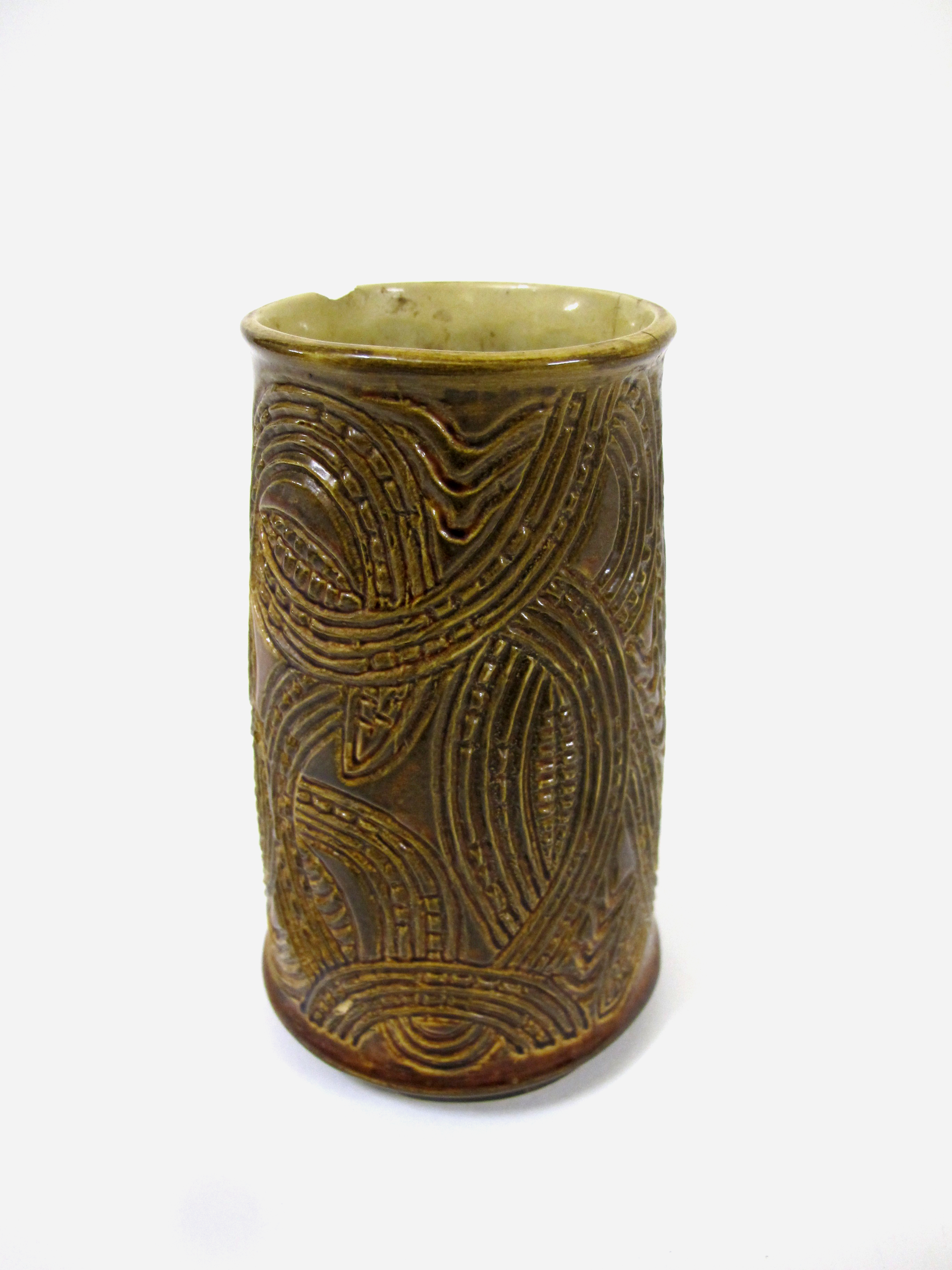
Māori- influenced designs by Harry Hargreaves. Collections of Auckland Museum.

The 1950s saw Crown Lynn focus on design. Artist Dave Jenkin who had come from the Elam School of Art was hired in 1945 and later headed the new design department.

In 1950, Mirek Smisek, originally from Czechoslovakia, started work at Crown Lynn. He worked as a design assistant to Shufflebotham and as a clay mixer then later created his own range for Crown Lynn named, Bohemia. The pieces had a sgraffito design and were glazed with brown-manganese-slip.

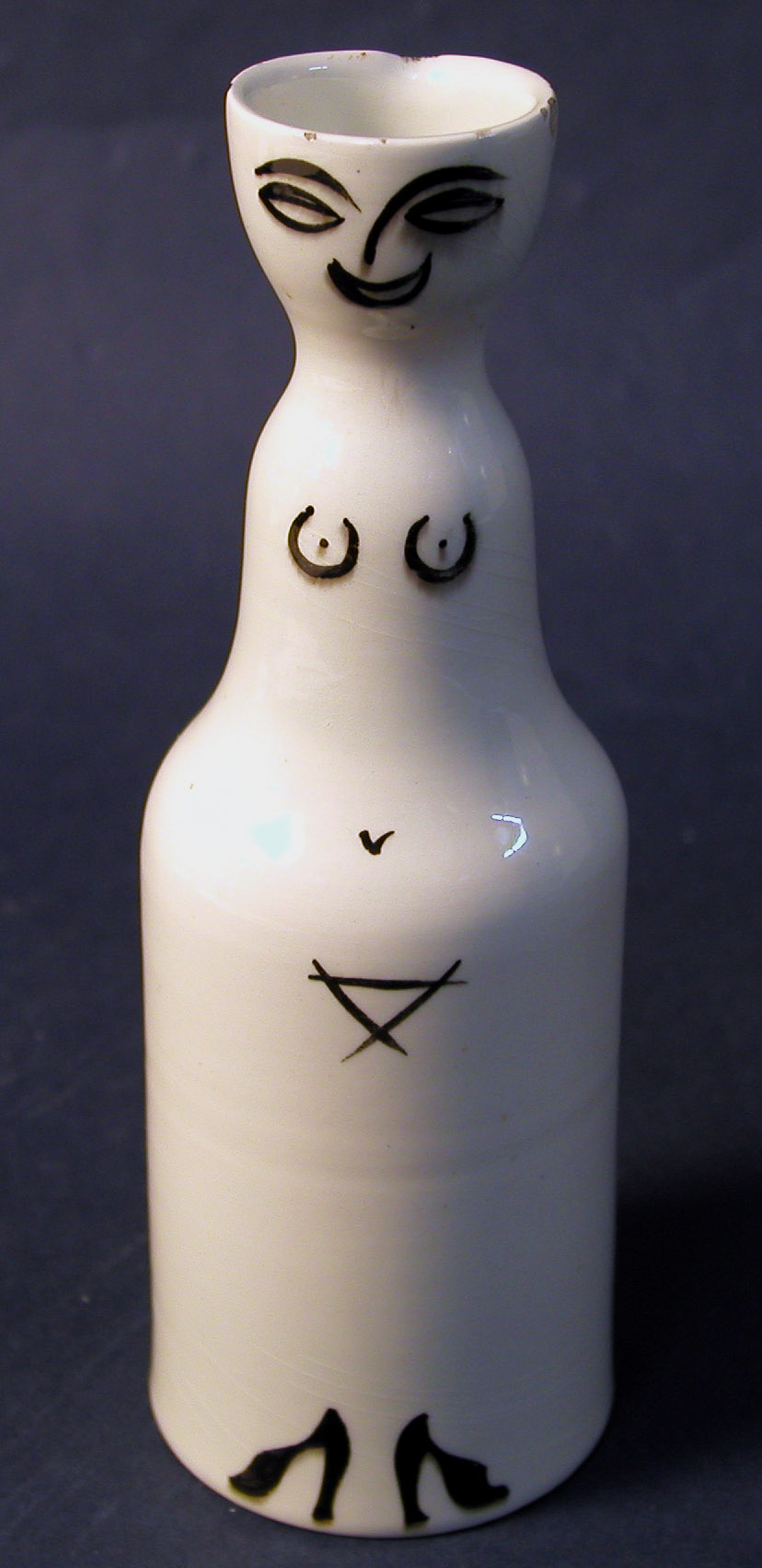
Frank Carpay for Crown Lynn Potteries Ltd. Collections of Auckland Museum.

In 1953, Frank Carpay, originally from the Netherlands, was hired to work at Crown Lynn. Carpay designed a series which was exhibited through art societies, such as the Auckland Society of Arts, and department stores, with the most popular pieces going into manufacture. His pieces were modern, abstract and bold in design, proving popular among art societies but not with the general public.

During the 1950s Crown Lynn became infamous for their unreliable handles that would often come apart. This problem was soon fixed when workers discovered a solution and by the 1960s, Crown Lynn's reputation had resolved.

During this time, the perception was that quality china products were made in England, while products made in New Zealand were perceived to be of lesser quality. Crown Lynn were competing with brands from England such as Royal Doulton and Wedgewood. Clark believed the products would sell better if people believed them to be made in England, so he gave series British sounding names such as; Ferndale British, Kelston Ware British and Covent Garden British.

Throughout its history, Crown Lynn had multiple factory fires. In 1956 a significant fire almost burnt the entire factory down, destroying much of the early history of the factory, including one off pieces and organisational records.

In 1959 the purchase of a Murray Curvex colour printing machine enabled the company to produce variations of popular overseas patterns.

== 1960s ==
The 1960s- 1970s are seen to have been the most successful time for Crown Lynn. By 1963, they had 360 staff and were producing eight million pieces a year. They opened their factory for tours during the 1960s, with numbers peaking at 200,000 visitors a year in 1966. In 1963, Queen Elizabeth II visited the factory where she was shown the display room and met executives and directors.

As a New Zealand identity, separate from British identity, was developing, Crown Lynn leant into this as notions of Kiwiana were becoming increasingly popular. During this time the company also established an annual design competition to build their collection of 'home-grown' designs. Applicants submitted designs for lithograph prints which could appear on mass-produced tableware. These annual competitions supported the company's public profile and provided marketing opportunities. Pieces from this time, locally designed by New Zealand artists, are popular collectable items today as they mark the development of a uniquely New Zealand style.

By the mid 1960s there were four Crown Lynn 'seconds' shops in Auckland.

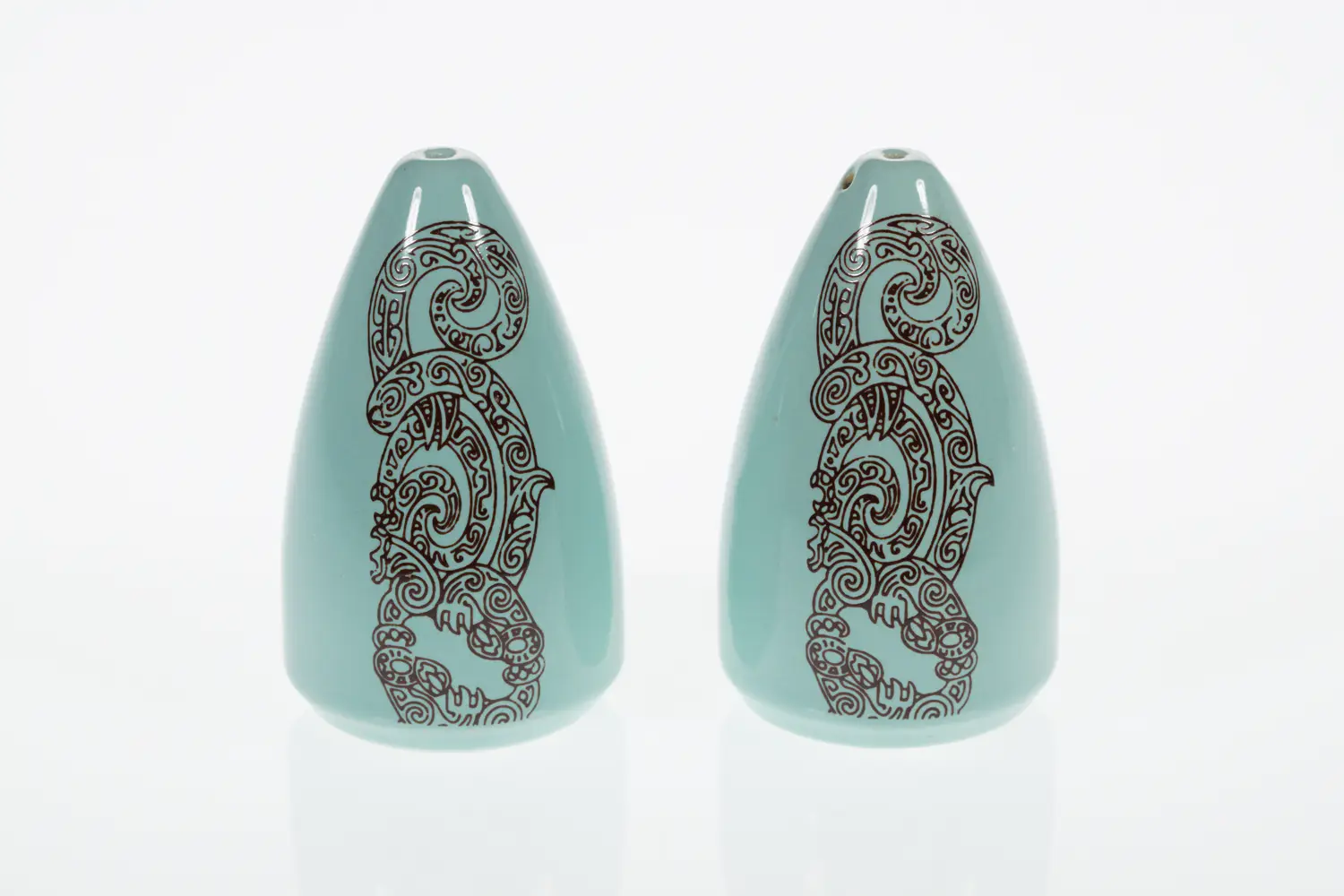
Salt and pepper shakers for Air New Zealand, 1965. Collections of Auckland Museum.

=== Air New Zealand ===
New Zealand's national airline carrier, Air New Zealand supported the company by commissioning inflight tableware for their first class passengers in 1965. The designs displayed a Māori motif ,inspired by a carving from Auckland Museum, in brown on turquoise. The set included cups, saucers, plates, butter dishes and salt and pepper shakers. Further items from Crown Lynn were included in TEAL and Air New Zealand's inflight range including Titian factory's honey-coloured goblets and ashtrays.

By 1967 Crown Lynn was manufacturing 10 million pieces of tableware a year with more than half being sold throughout New Zealand. At this time the most popular designs were; Autumn Splendor, Shibui, Capri, Golden Fall, Green Bamboo, New York, Narvik and Fabrique.

Crown Lynn purchased a number of New Zealand ceramic companies including Christchurch-based pottery Luke Adams in 1965. A number of Crown Lynn shapes were subsequently made in Christchurch for several years until factory's close in 1975. As well as Gibsons & Paterson in 1968, which was established in New Zealand in 1909 and opened in Australia in 1913. Ceramco continued to hold shares in the company after Crown Lynn was shut down until Ceramco's liquidation in 2001. As well as Titian Studio (based in Takanini) which was bought in 1969–71.

== 1970s ==
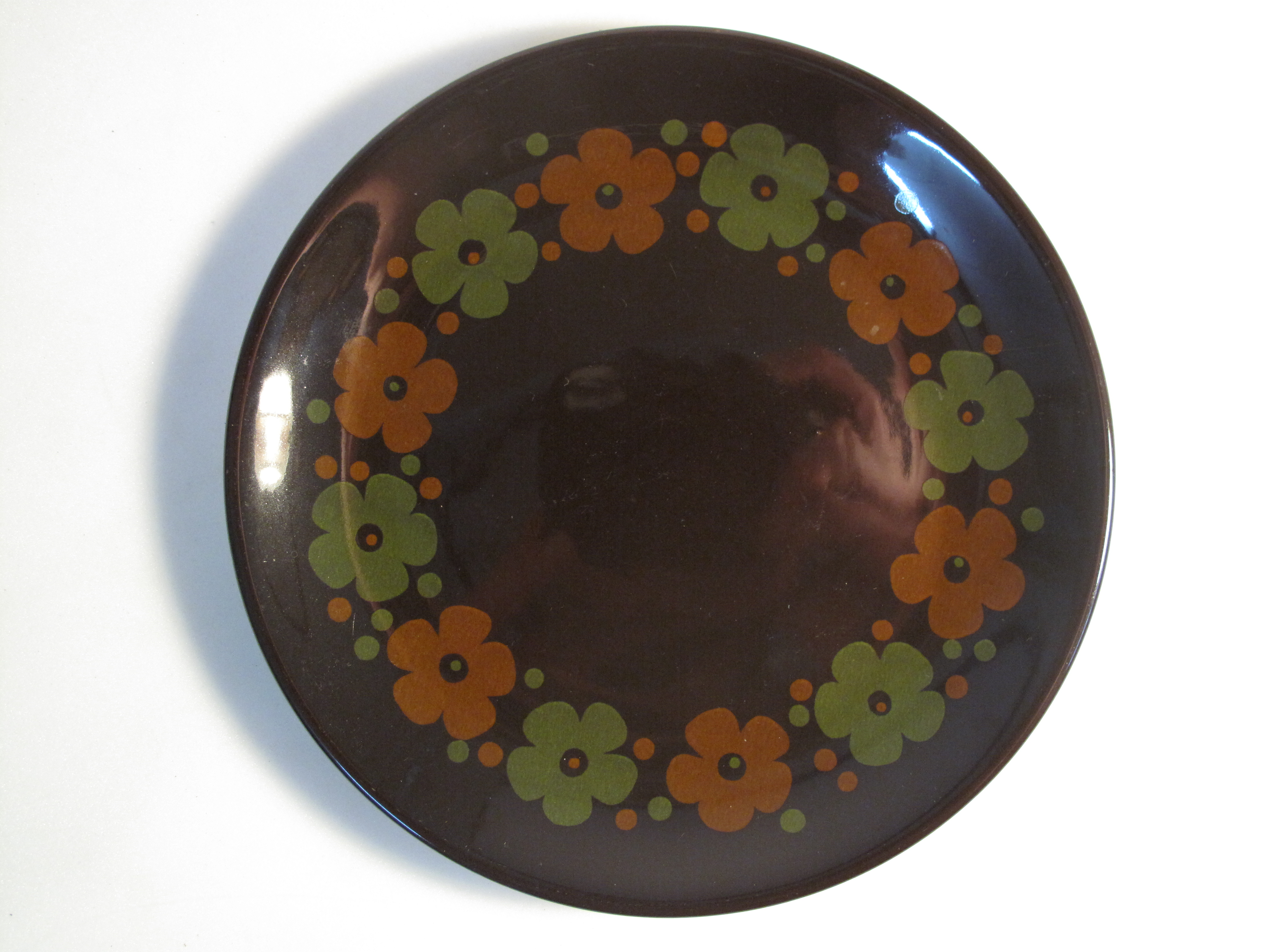
Dark Brown plate, Flower Border, circa 1975. Collections of Auckland Museum.

Crown Lynn was embedded into New Zealand life by the mid 1970s. During the 1970s they started producing brown, rustic style pottery which was a popular style of the time.

In 1971 Crown Lynn purchased Royal Grafton in the UK, manufacturers of fine bone china. This continued to run separately and did not manufacture Crown Lynn shapes. Royal Grafton was sold in 1985 in a management buyout. In 1973, there were roughly 50 subsidiary companies within the Crown Lynn group. By 1974 the name, Consolidated Brick & Pipe Investments Ltd, was renamed Ceramco.

During the 1970s, Crown Lynn struggled to fill the 500-600 jobs in their business. During the 1960s they started employing young Māori from rural New Zealand. They then looked to the Pacific Islands, with Crown Lynn representatives travelling to Tonga and Samoa to recruit workers. They found them accommodation in Auckland and paid the initial airfare, docking their wages until it was repaid.The employment of Pacific people at Crown Lynn was effected by the Dawn Raids which violently targeted Pacific communities.

At the time Crown Lynn was the southern hemisphere's largest producer of household pottery, and remained so up to at least 1978. At its height the factory employed 650 staff, produced about 17 million pieces annually, and exported to Australia, South Africa, the Pacific Islands, south-east Asia, the US and Canada. Around 1972 Crown Lynn set up a large factory in the Philippines which operated until 1981-1982.

== 1980s ==
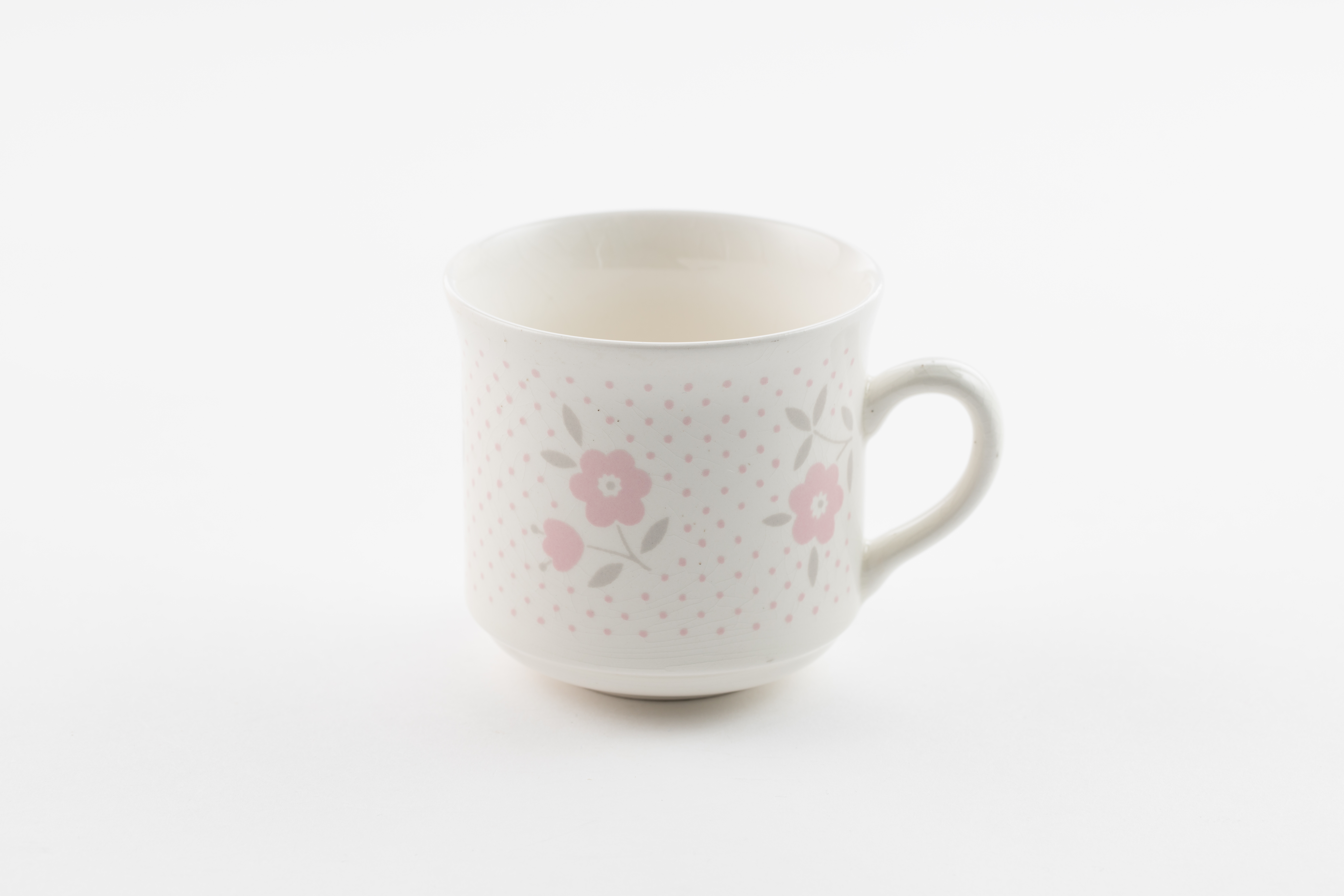
Crown Lynn Potteries Ltd, 1980s. Collections of Auckland Museum.

By the 1980s, the New Zealand market was saturated with Crown Lynn. Society was changing and dining attitudes were becoming more casual, the demand for Crown Lynn was steadily declining. By 1984, the conglomerate Ceramco owned over 60 businesses across New Zealand, Australia, Canada, the United States of America, England and the Philippines. Crown Lynn was no longer the main focus of the parent company.

With new cheap imported wares to compete with, Crown Lynn's sales dropped as the New Zealand market favoured brands such as Royal Doulton, Royal Albert, Noritake, Wedgwood and Arzberg.(137) In 1980 the company started advertising some wares omitting the Crown Lynn name, in an attempt to increase sales.

In March 1894, Tom Clark retired as managing director of Ceramco. Businessmen, Alan Gibbs and Charles Bidwill had a strong influence over Ceramco operations by mid 1987. They closed businesses and sold assets in an attempt to save the company. From 1986 to early 1987,170 workers were made redundant.

On 5 May 1989, Ceramco announced the Crown Lynn factory closure, with the loss of 220 jobs.

In 1993 all of Crown Lynn's assets, including plant, designs and brand name, were sold to the Malaysian company, GBH Porcelain.

== Alternative brand names ==
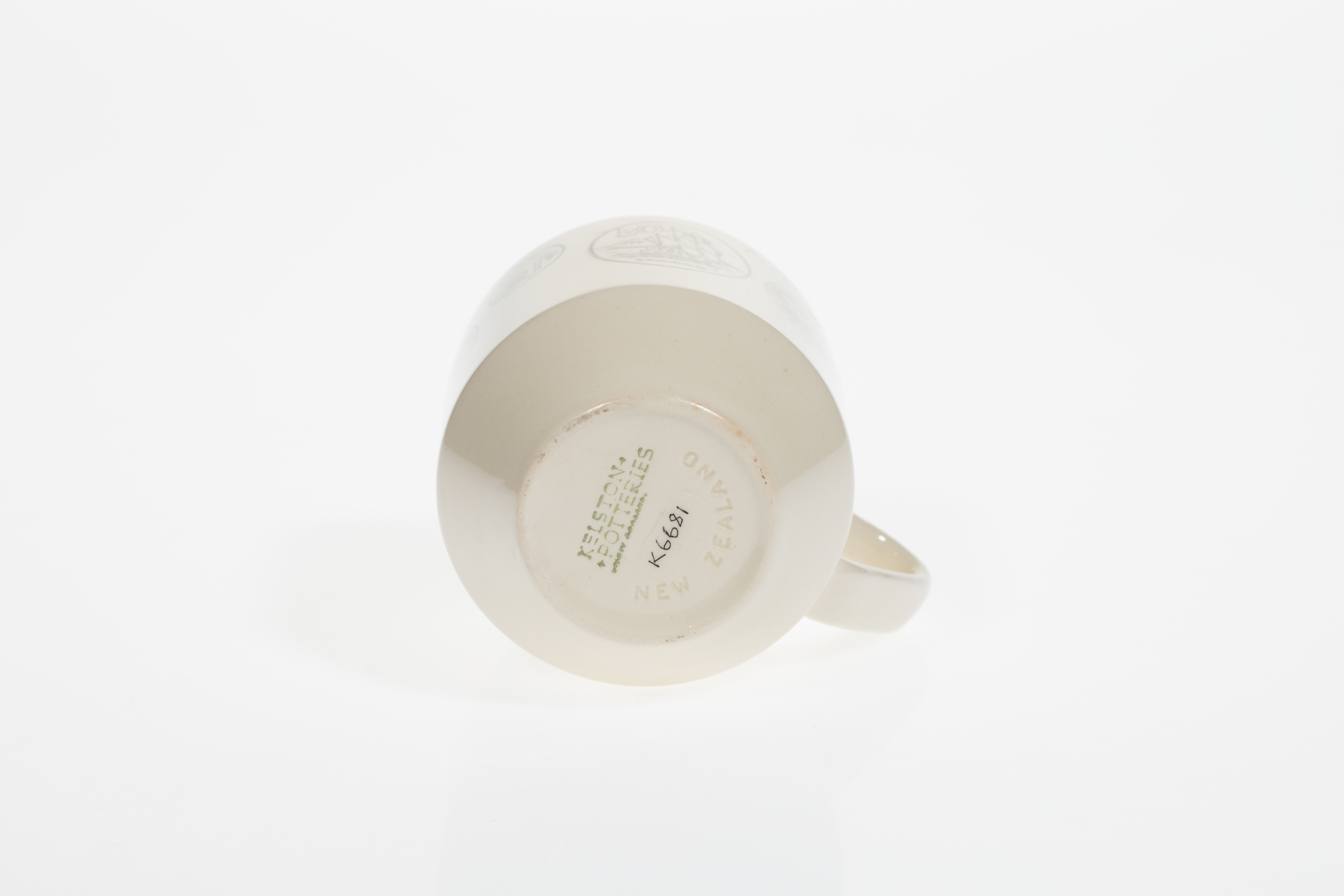
Kelston Potteries; Crown Lynn Potteries Ltd. Collections of Auckland Museum.

From the late 1950s until at least the late 1970s, Crown Lynn marketed much of its domestic tableware under a series of alternative brand names incorporating the word 'Kelston', including Kelston British, Kelston Ware, Kelston Potteries, Kelston Ceramics, and Kelston Ferrostone.

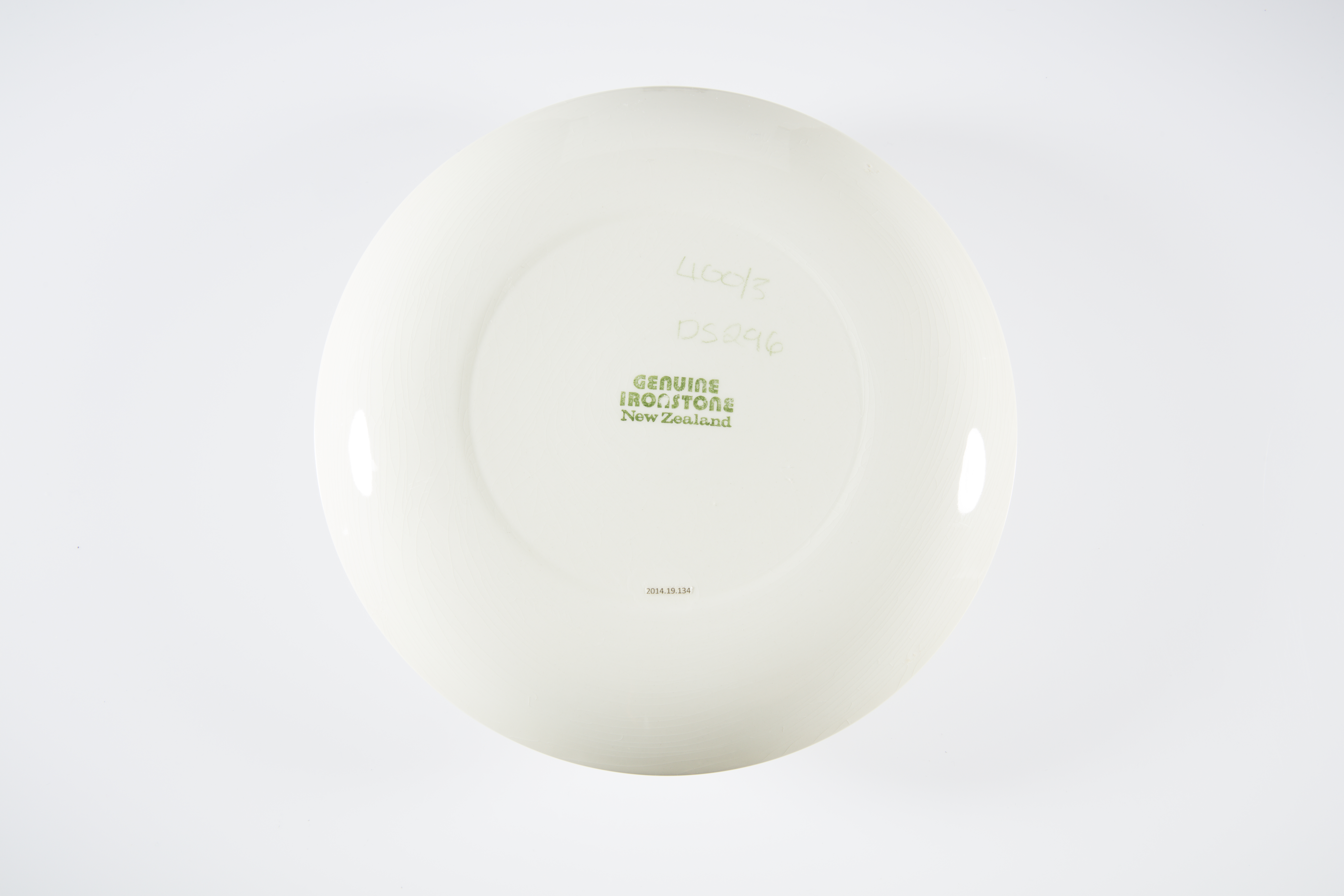
Genuine Ironstone. Crown Lynn Potteries Ltd. Collections of Auckland Museum.

Kelston was used as a parallel brand for Crown Lynn products aimed at large-scale department and variety chain retailers, leaving Crown Lynn for more upmarket outlets. Kelston (and Roydon) products were not included in Crown Lynn's replacement range policy (guaranteeing availability for at least 6 years), which allowed the range to be updated with fresh new designs more quickly. Others included:

- Ascot (sold at McKenzies)
- Aurora (used for the fine stoneware range between 1980 and 1983)
- Avondale Selection (named after Avondale Raceway)
- Brereton Ware (exclusive to D.I.C - named after their head buyer Jack Brereton)
- Colourglaze
- Contemporary Ceramics
- Essentials Quality Homewares
- Fancy Fayre
- Goldline
- Genuine Ironstone
- Handwerk
- Titianware
- Lynndale (a portmanteau of New Lynn and Avondale)
- Kelston British / Potteries / Ceramics / Ferrostone (named after the Auckland suburb of Kelston, adjacent to New Lynn)
- Ngakura
- Roydon (exclusive to McKenzies & named after McKenzies founding brothers Roy and Don)
- Wentworth Ware
- Wharetana
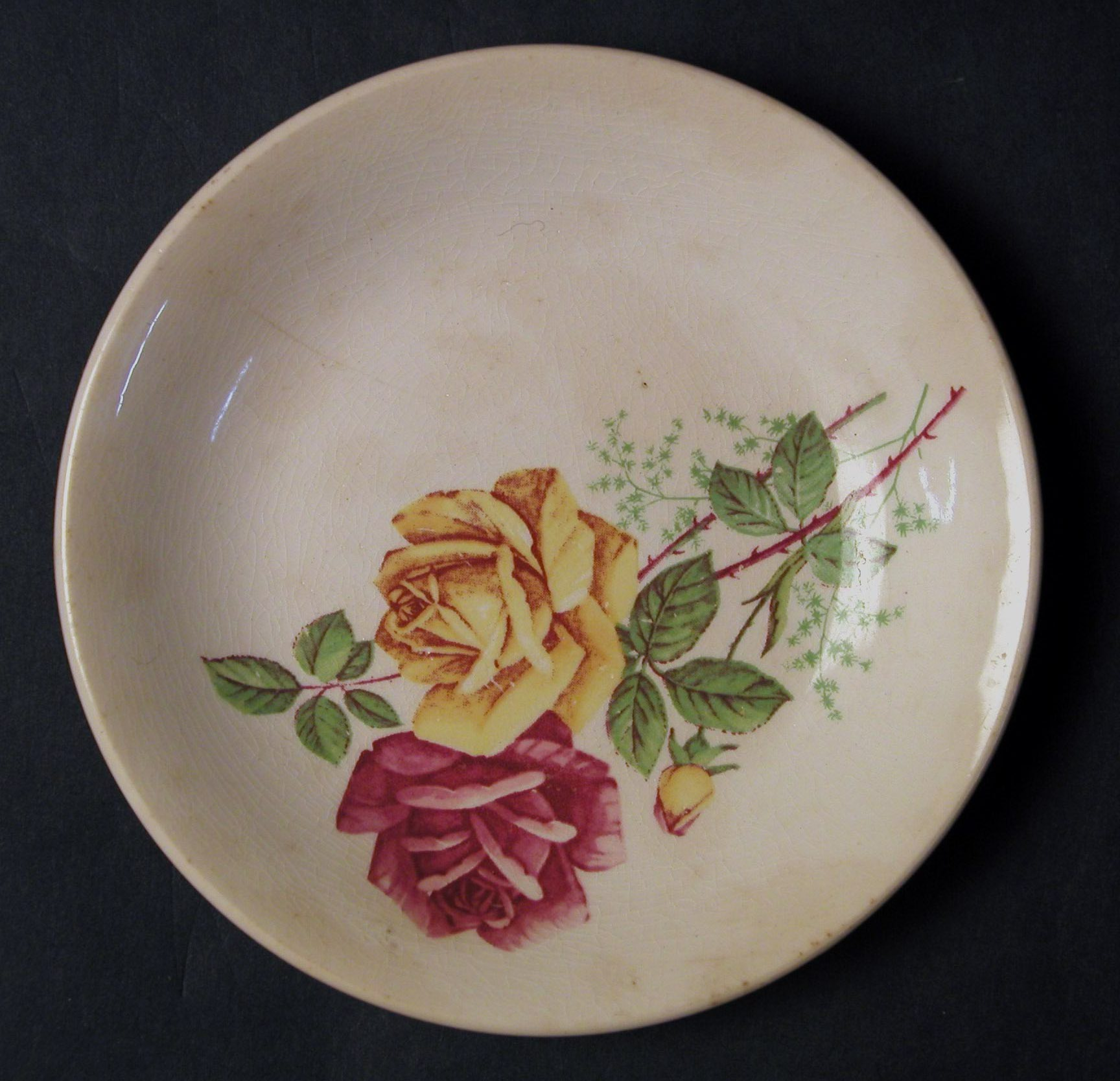
Ascot

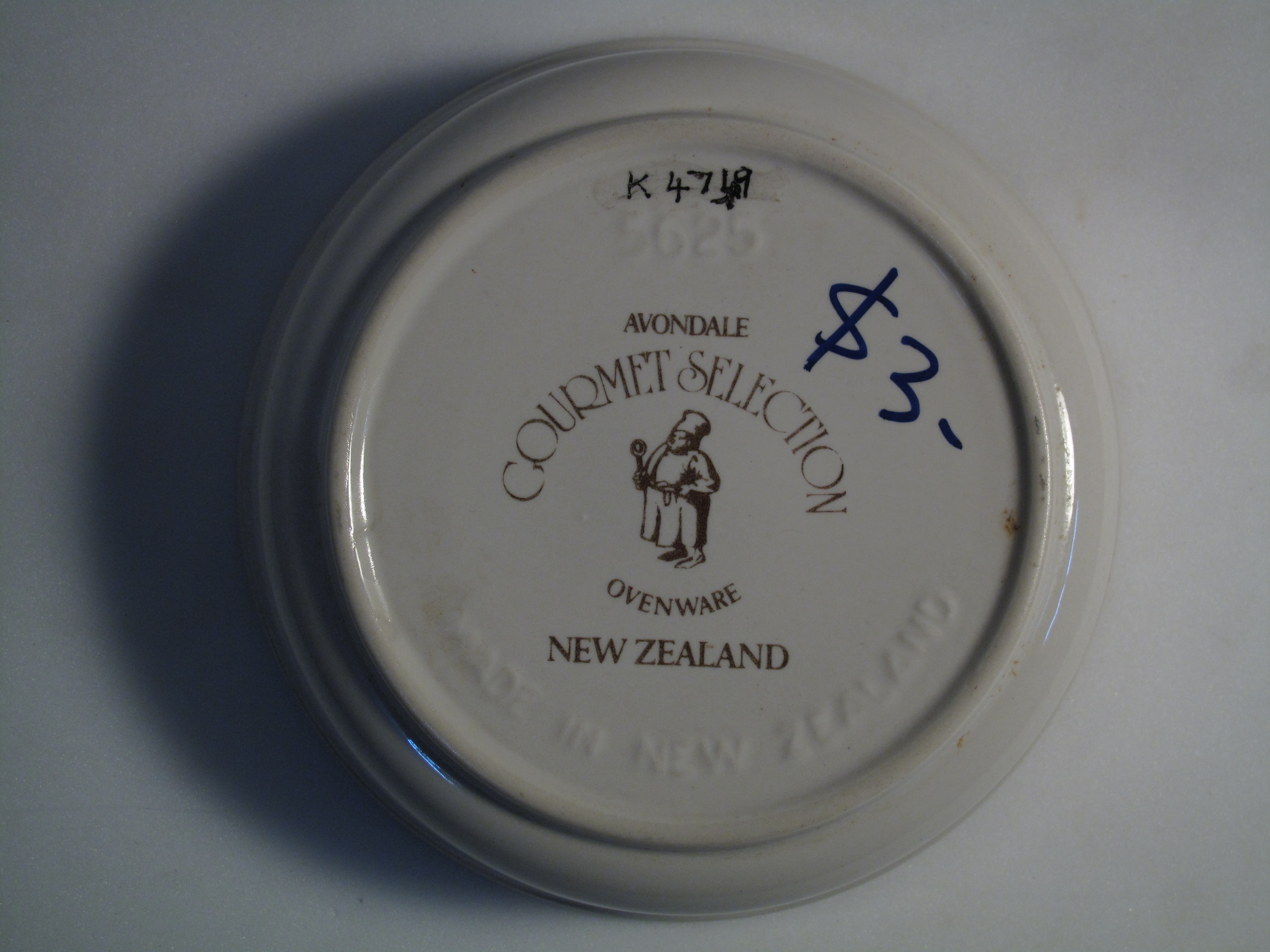
Avondale

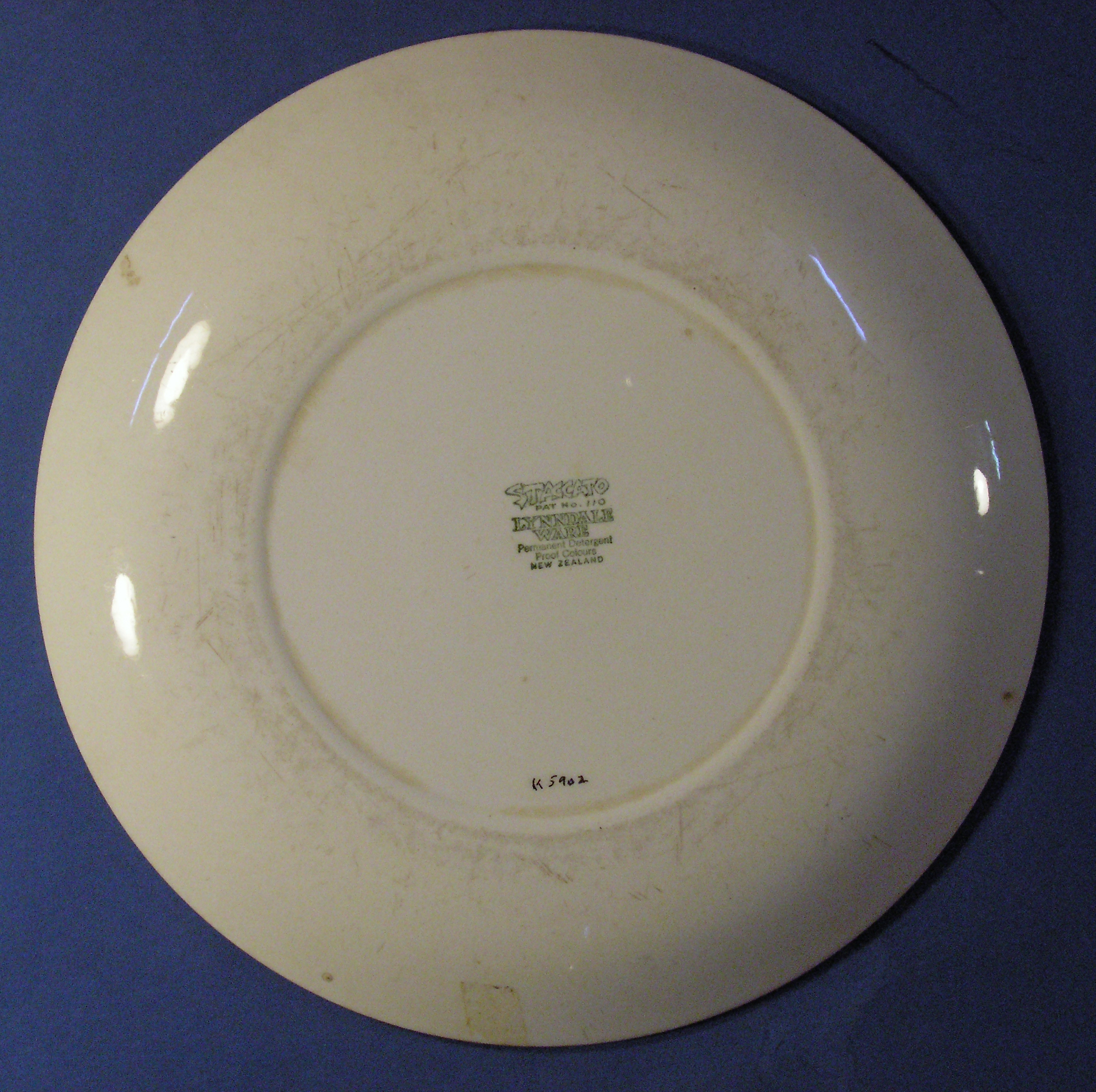
Lynndale

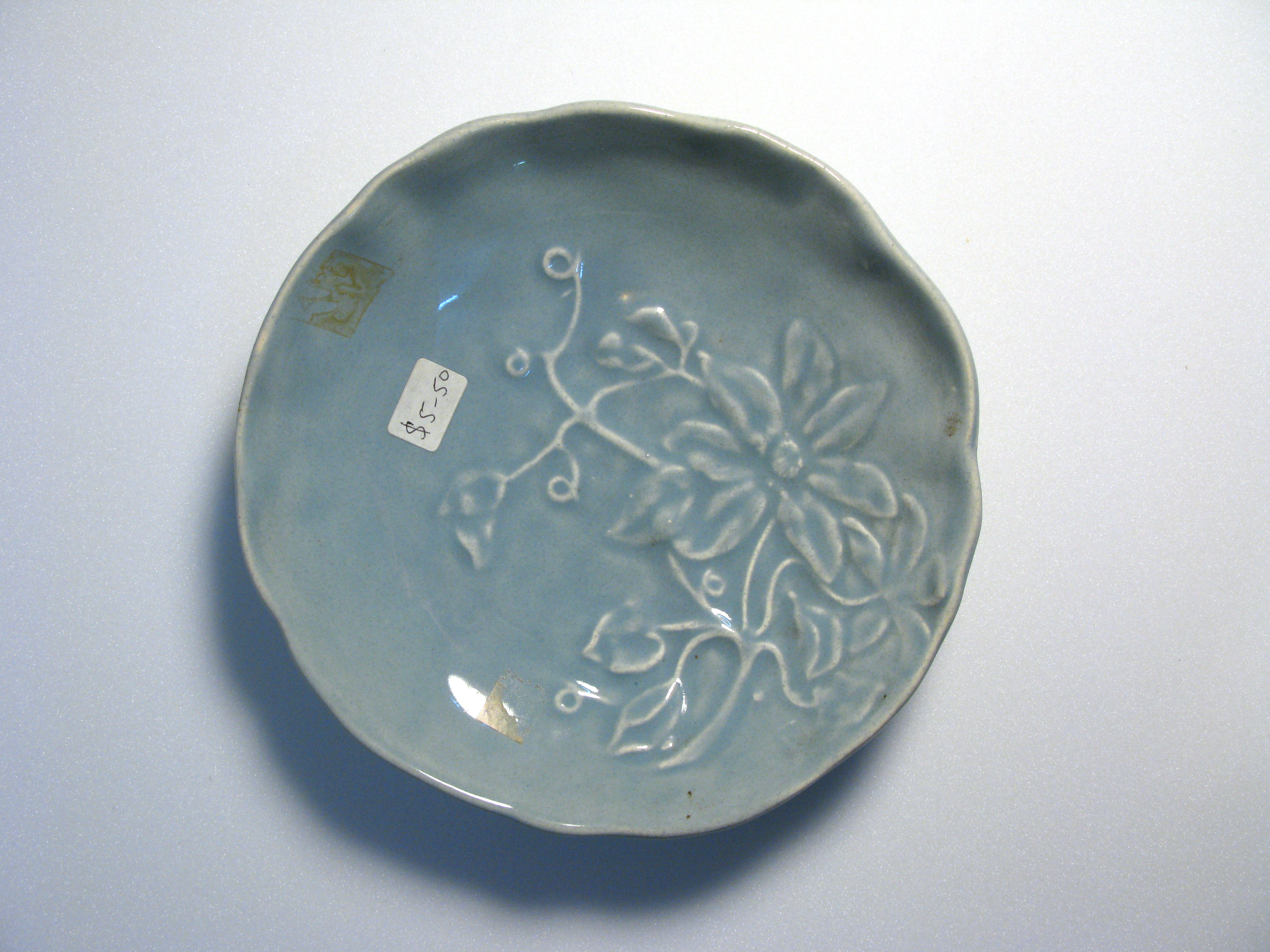
Wentworth Ware

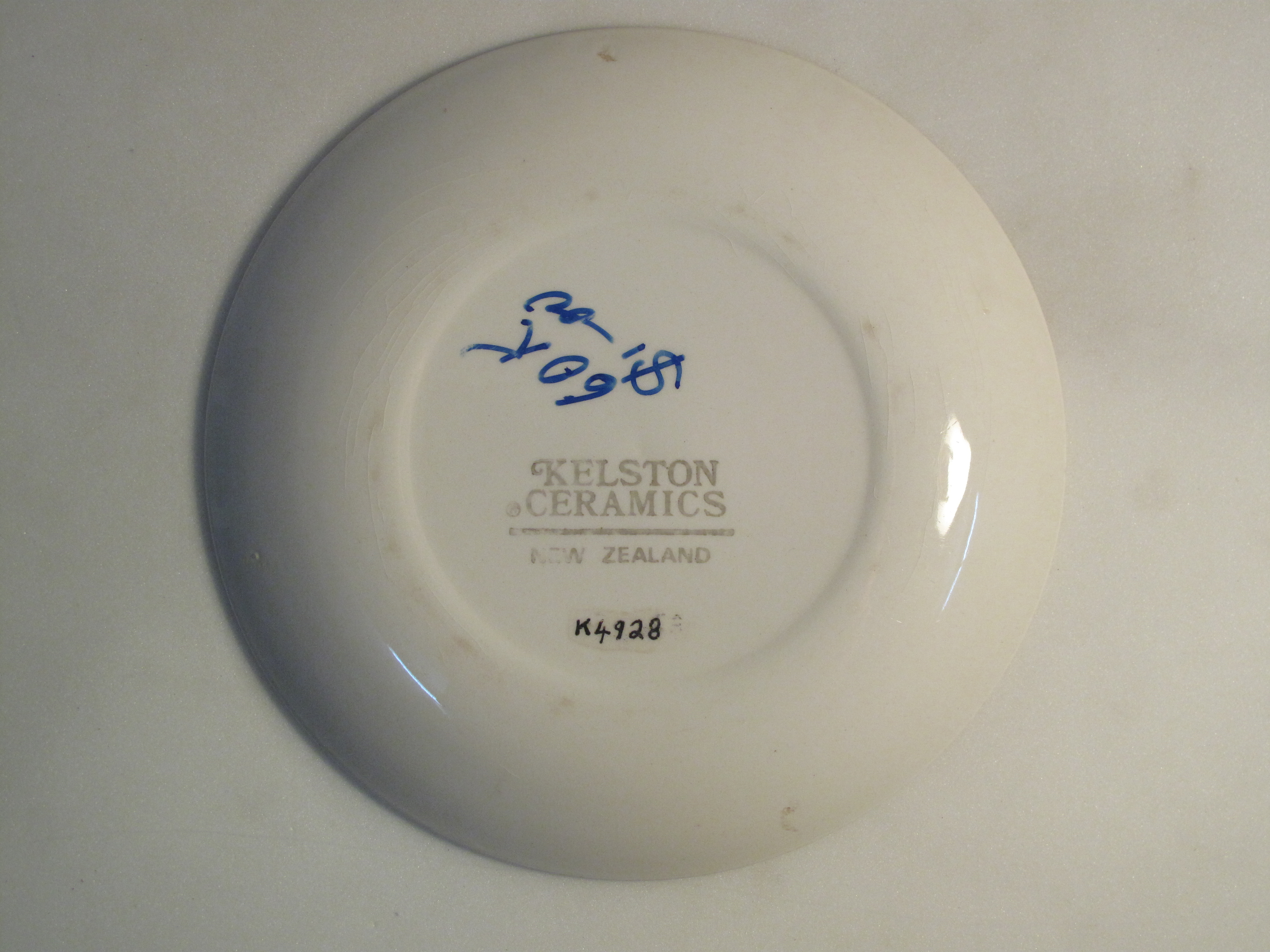
Kelston

== Notable people ==
Over the years Crown Lynn employed a number of potters, designers and factory workers who contributed to the company. These included:

- Dave Jenkin was a head ceramics designer who started at Crown Lynn in 1945 and is most known for trickle glazed vases.
- Daniel Steenstra started at Crown Lynn in 1953 from Holland who specialised in hand potted vases.
- Frank Carpay was a ceramics designer hired at Crown Lynn in 1953 and is most known for his bold style.
- Ernest Shufflebottom was a ceramics designer who started at Crown Lynn in 1948 (till 1957) and is most known for matte white glazed vases.
- Mireck Smisek was a ceramics designer started at Crown Lynn in 1950 and is most known for the Bohemia series.
- Mark Cleverley was a designer who started in 1968 and had previously won two Crown Lynn design competitions.
- Tom Bollington was decorating manager from late 1947.
- John Cowdery was a plaster mould maker from the late 1940s.
- Ray Machin was a mould maker from Stoke-on-Trent who joined Crown Lynn in 1959.
- Eileen Machin was a hand decorator from Stoke-on-Trent who joined Crown Lynn in 1959.
- Doris Bird was a hand decorator from Stoke-on-Trent who joined Crown Lynn in 1949.
- Mary Baillie was a hand decorator from Stoke-on-Trent who joined Crown Lynn in 1949.
- Maude Bowles was a hand decorator and head of decorating department at Crown Lynn for around thirty years.
- Bebe Cowdery (nee Woolright), was one of the first women hired at Crown Lynn in 1942.
- Karen Karaka was the first Māori woman to join the Ceramco cadetship programme in 1977 in which she trained as a factory manager.
- Dorothy Thorpe was an American glassware designer who created a range for the United States and Canadian markets which launched in 1965.
- Tam Mitchell was chief modeler and joined Crown Lynn in 1951.
- Fred Hoffman was the factory manager in the 1940s and known for his proficiency with kilns.
- Harry Jones was a ceramicist at Royal Doulton who moved to New Zealand to work at Crown Lynn in 1961.

== Legacy ==
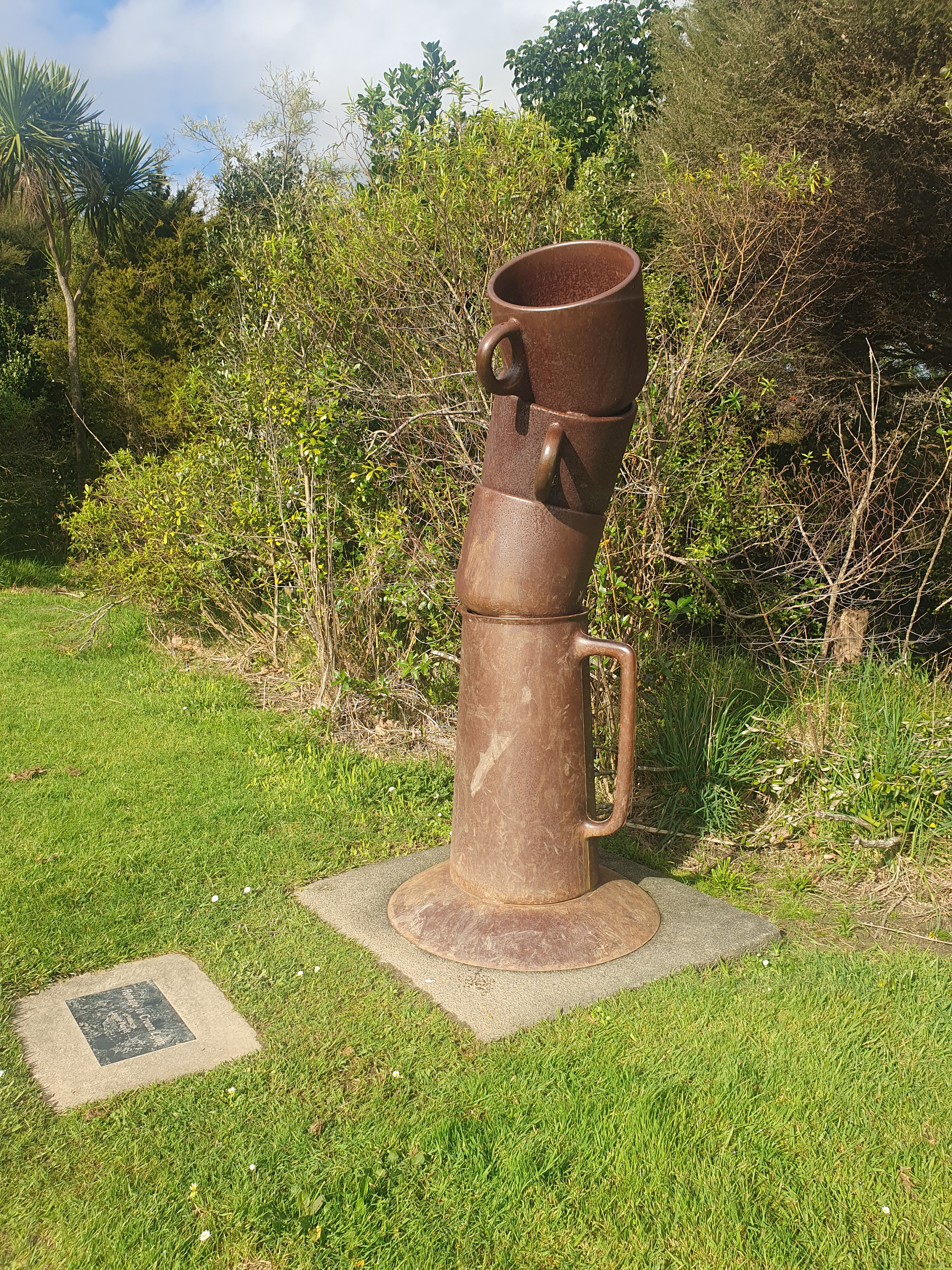
Homage to Crown Lynn, an artwork by Louise Purvis at Olympic Park, New Lynn, West Auckland, New Zealand

Overtime Crown Lynn has become synonymous with New Zealand design identity and Kiwiana style. Crown Lynn is held in Museum collections across New Zealand such as Auckland Museum and Te Papa. In 2015, Te Toi Uku – Crown Lynn & Clayworks Museum was opened. It is dedicated to preserving and telling the story of Crown Lynn and West Auckland's ceramic history and is managed by the Portage Ceramics Trust. It is located on the Gardener and Parker Brothers brickworks site.

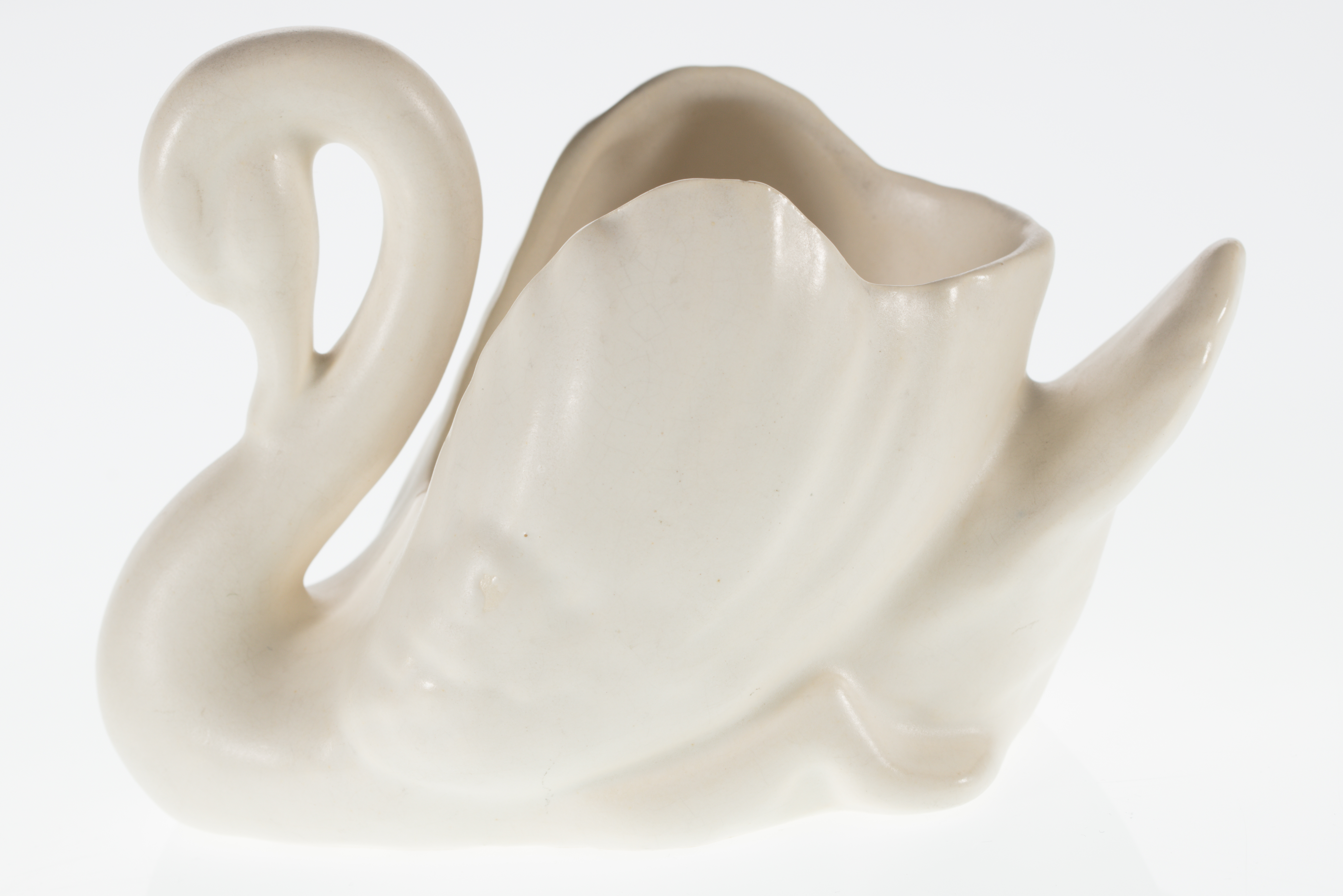
Crown Lynn swan vase. Collections of Auckland Museum.

Located in New Lynn are Crown Lynn Place, Clark Street and Ambrico Place, an ode to the history and influence of ceramics in West Auckland.

In 2011, there were two exhibitions on Crown Lynn collections: Crown Lynn: Crockery of Distinction at City Gallery Wellington and Crown Lynn: Pottery for the People at Gus Fisher Gallery. In 2024, a play called, The Handlers, honoured the presence and legacy of Māori and Pacific women staff during the 1970s.

Some Crown Lynn ceramics are now highly collectable, such as early Ambrico trickle-glazed pieces and swan vases.
