= Te Toi Uku – Crown Lynn & Clayworks Museum =

Clayworks museum in Auckland, New Zealand

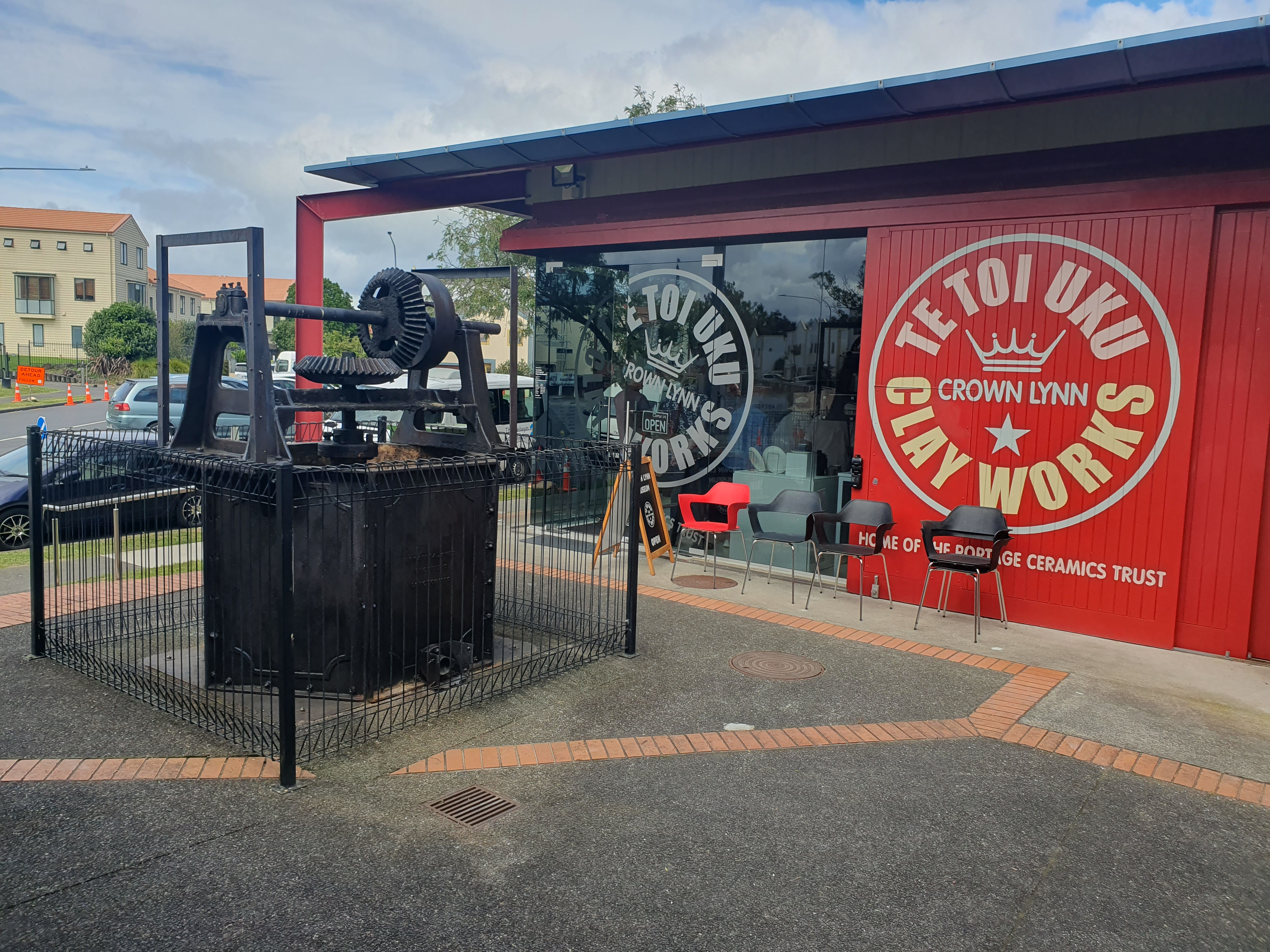
- Te Toi Uku: Crown Lynn & Clayworks Museum, 2023.
- Interactive map of the Te Toi Uku – Crown Lynn & Clayworks Museum area
- Alternative names: Te Toi Uku: Crown Lynn & Clayworks Museum

General information
- Location: 8 Ambrico Place, New Lynn, Auckland, New Zealand
- Coordinates: 36.9111°S 174.6802°E
- Opened: 2015

Website
- www.tetoiuku.org.nz

Te Toi Uku – Crown Lynn & Clayworks Museum is a community focused museum located in New Lynn, Auckland. The museum focuses on sharing West Auckland's ceramic history and preserving the history of the New Zealand ceramics manufacturer Crown Lynn.

== Background ==
In 2005 the Portage Ceramics Trust was founded to administrate a large private collection of ceramics and pottery-making equipment relating to Crown Lynn. The collection belonged to Richard Quinn who collected Crown Lynn pottery and who in 1989, on the factory's demolition, undertook an archaeological survey of the Crown Lynn factory site. Quinn collected Crown Lynn crockery, moulds, machinery, photographs and business documents.

In 2015, Te Toi Uku opened to the public, the Māori name translates to 'The Art of Clay'. The museum is located near the former Parker & Gardener Bros brickworks and later Crown Lynn factory site. It is also next to the original Parker & Gardener Bros downdraught kiln, built in 1927.

The museum is supported by the Whau Local Board of the Auckland Council.

== Collections ==
The collection consists of over 6,000 objects from the 1880s to present. While the collections mostly consist of Crown Lynn ceramics, there are also a number of objects related to the early brick and pipe industries in West Auckland.

=== Crown Lynn ===
The Richard Quinn collection makes up a large proportion of Te Toi Uku's collection of Crown Lynn spanning from the 1940s to the 1980s. The collection spans objects such as dinnerware, nursery ware and vitrified porcelain. This also includes the Valerie Ringer Monk collection, donated by collector and author of two books on Crown Lynn; Crown Lynn Collectors Handbook and Crown Lynn A New Zealand Icon. As well as the Carl Larsen collection which include ceramics from early Crown Lynn designer, Frank Carpay.

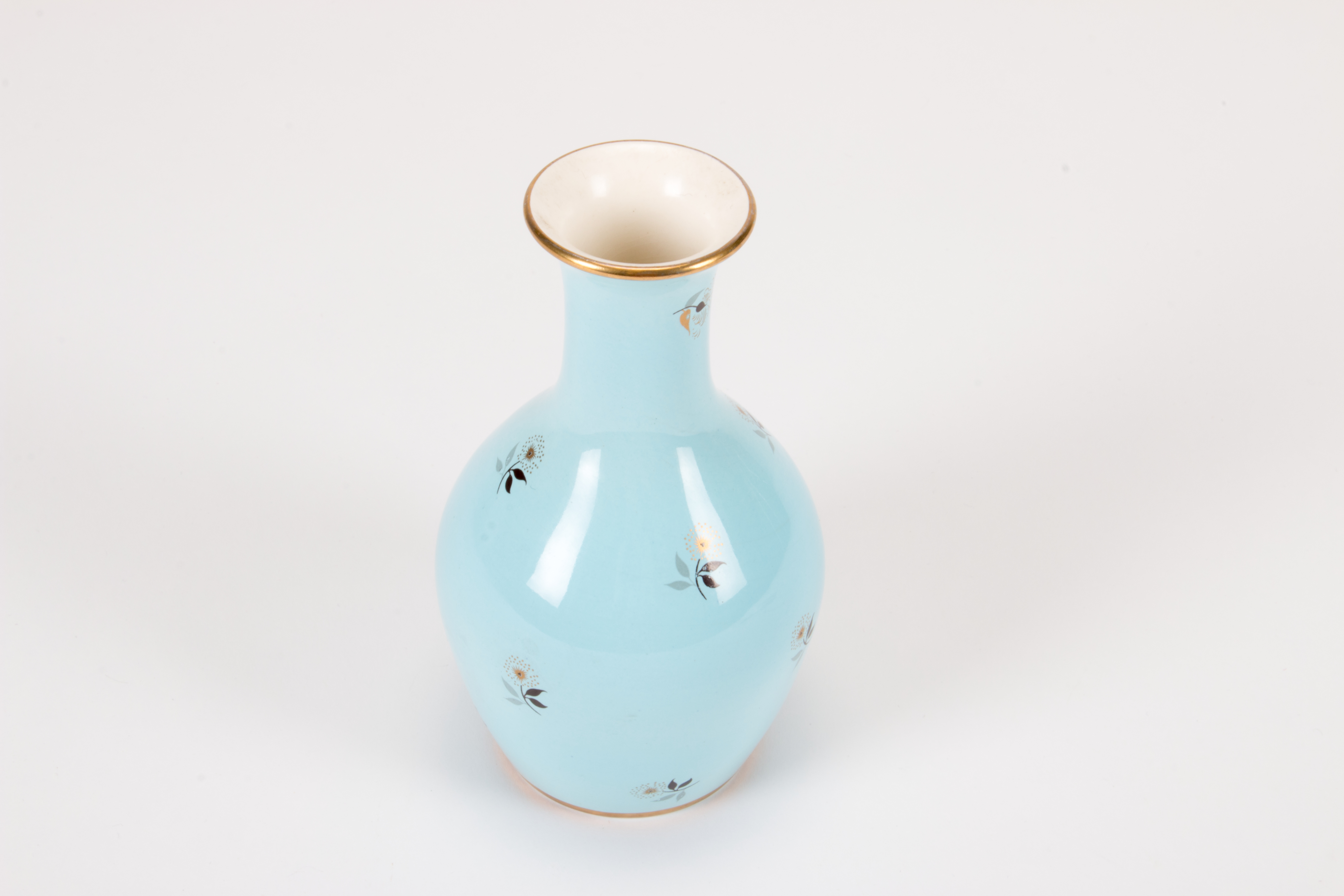

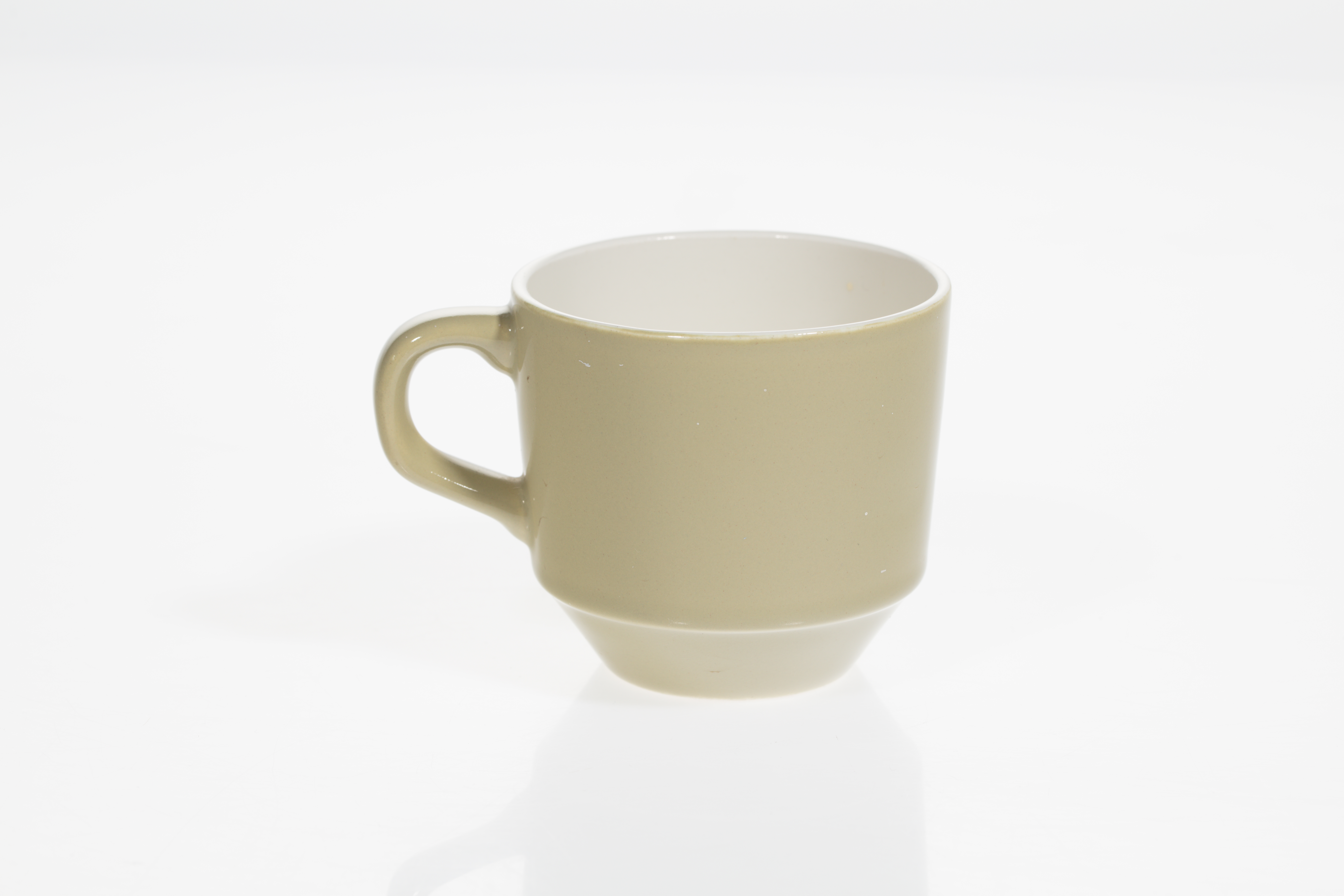

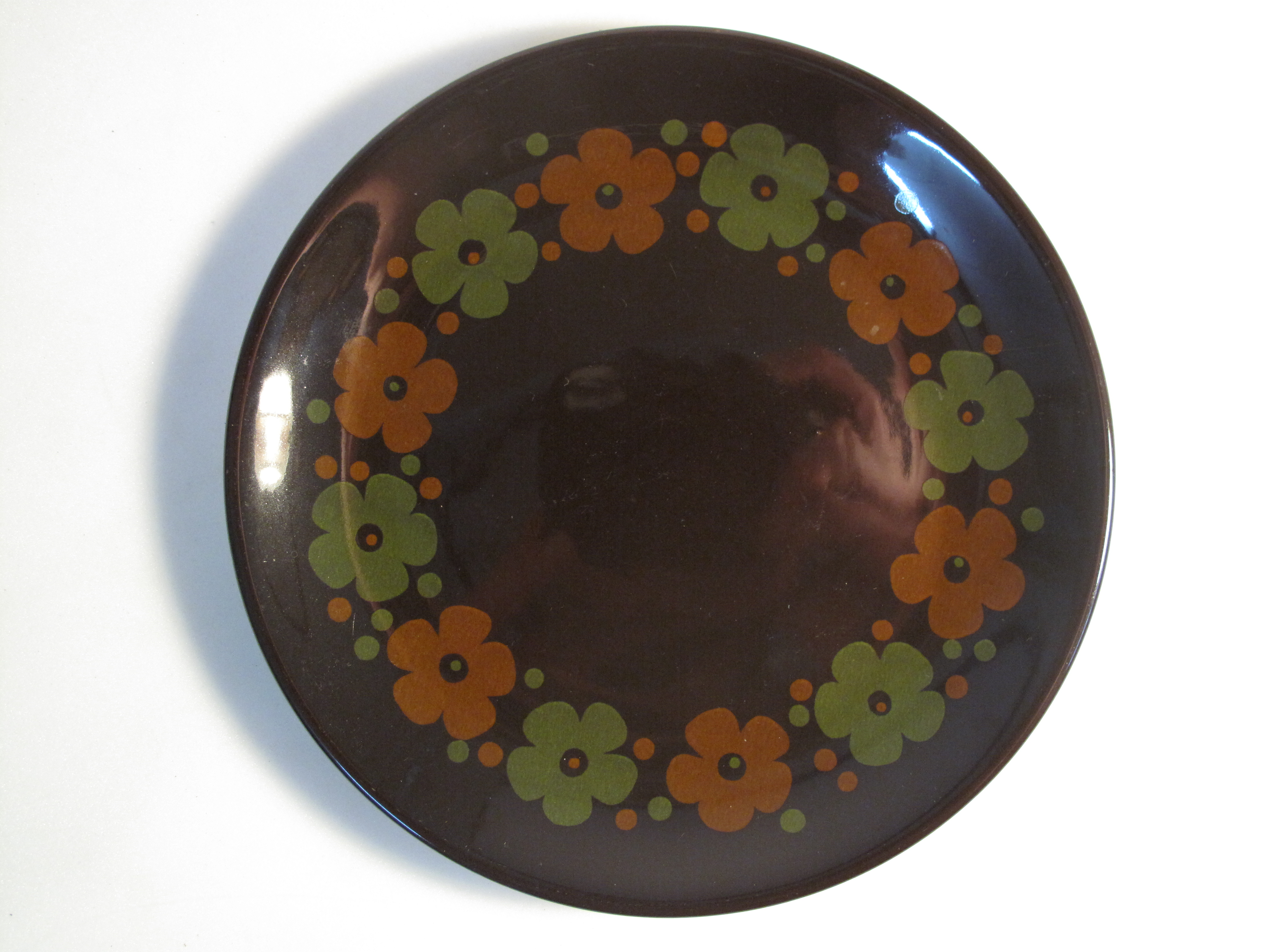

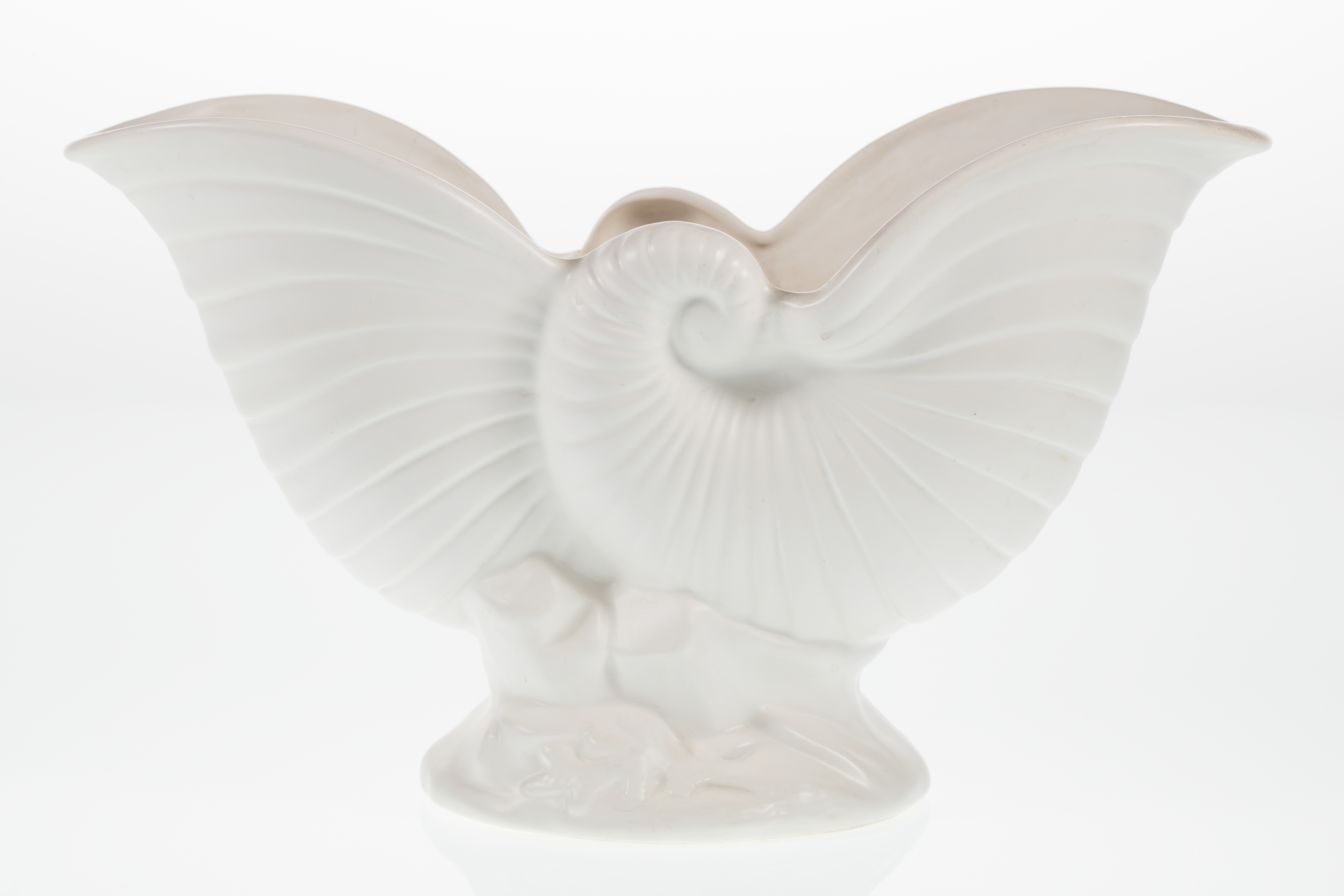

=== West Auckland Clay & Brick Industries ===
Te Toi Uku's collection also includes objects and machinery from the former Waitakere City Council, which are significant to the wider West Auckland clay industry. Highlighting the developments in production techniques over time. Notably the museum's collection also includes historic bricks from the collection of Auckland historian, J.T Diamond. As well as extensive documentation and photographs of West Auckland industrial history.

The collections also includes pieces from 1980s company Studio Ceramics.

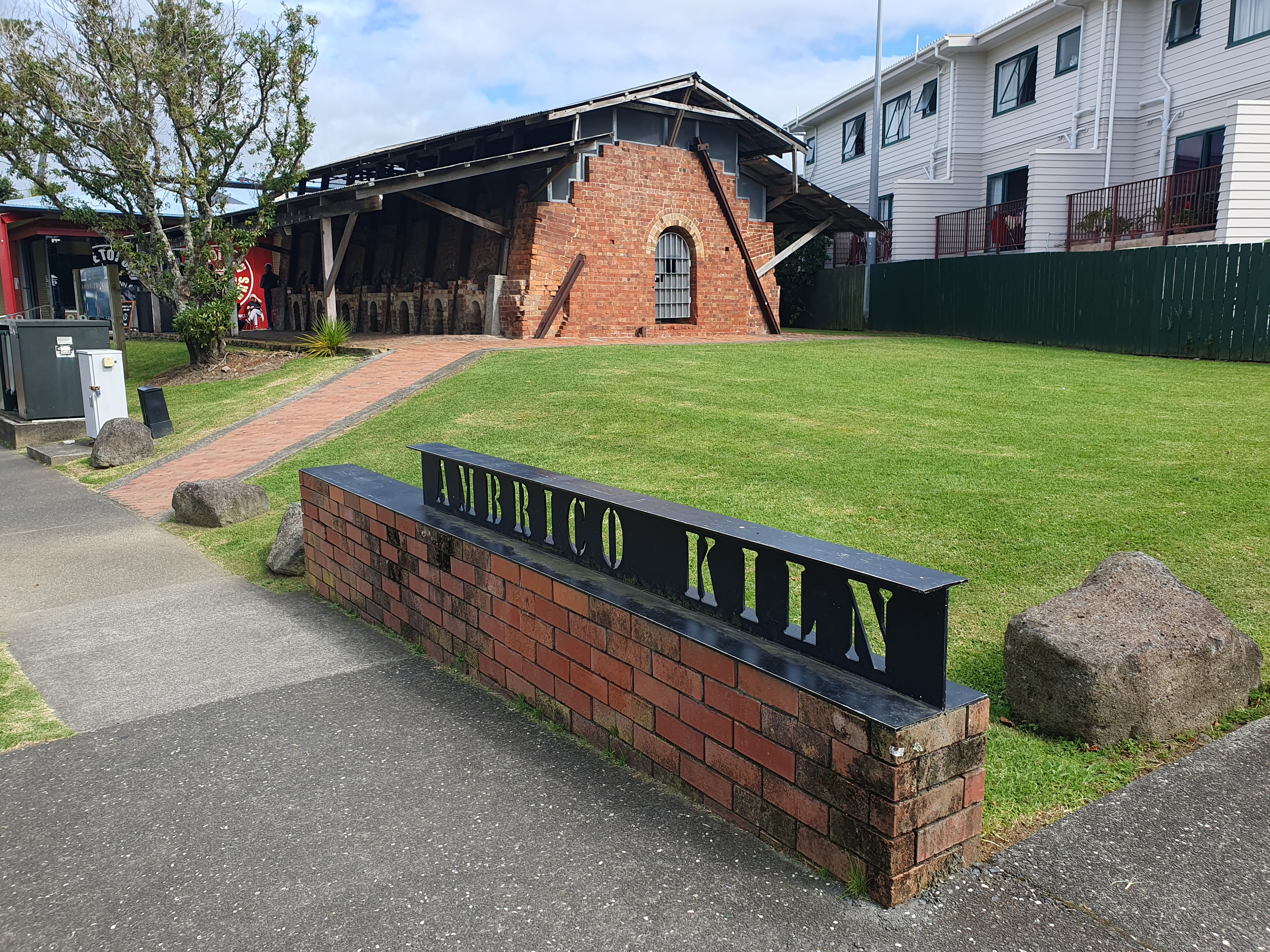
Ambrico kiln at Te Toi Uku
