= Ernest Shufflebotham =

English-born potter and designer

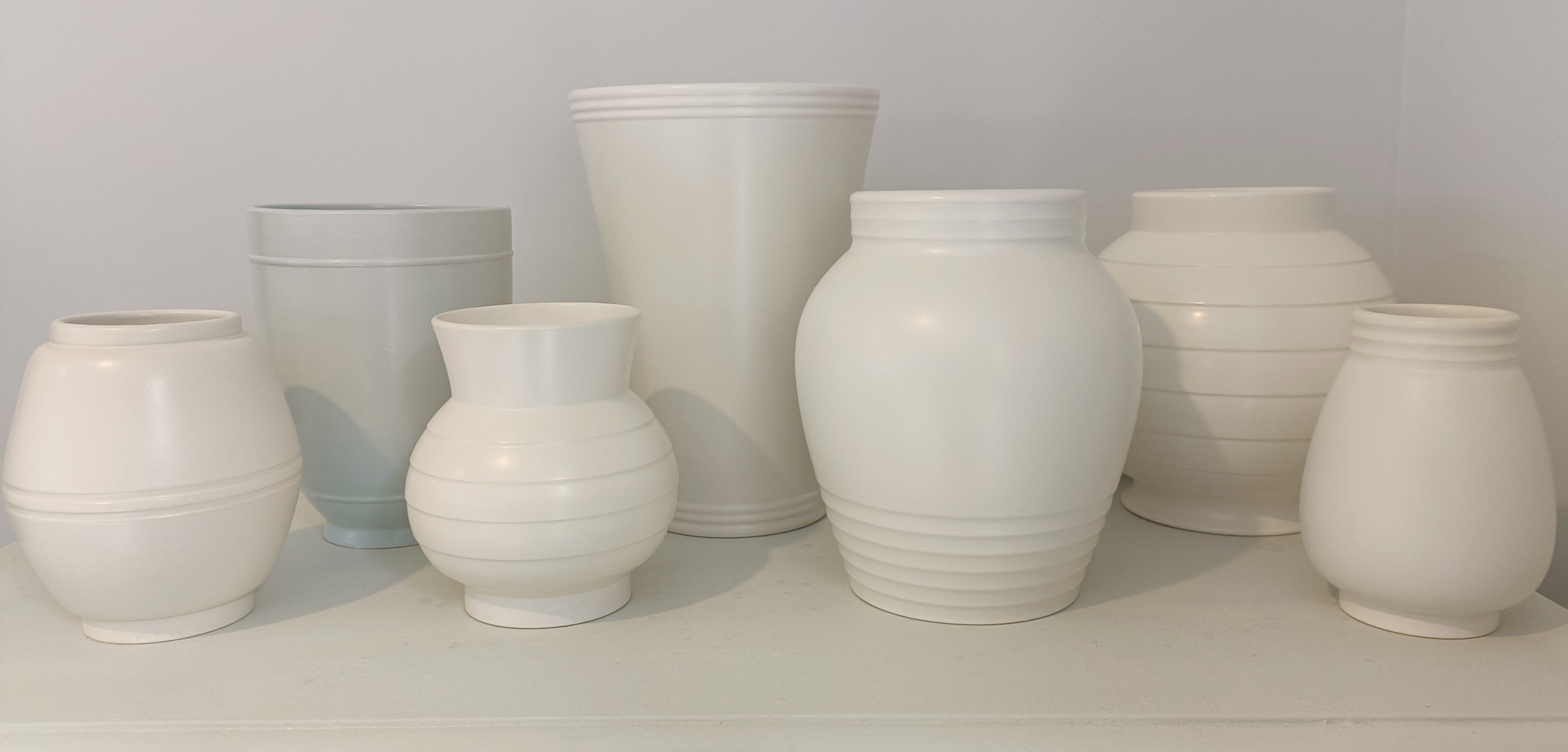
Selection of vases attributed to Ernest Shufflebotham during his time at Crown Lynn

Ernest Shufflebotham (19 September 1908 – 6 May 1984) was an English-born potter and designer active from the 1920s through 1950s.

== Early life ==
Ernest Harvey Shufflebotham was born on 19 September 1908 to Enoch John Shufflebotham and May Shufflebotham in Newcastle-under-Lyme, Staffordshire, England. His father was a house painter. Ernest had a younger brother, Colin Beresford Shufflebotham, born on 14 September 1910.

== Career ==
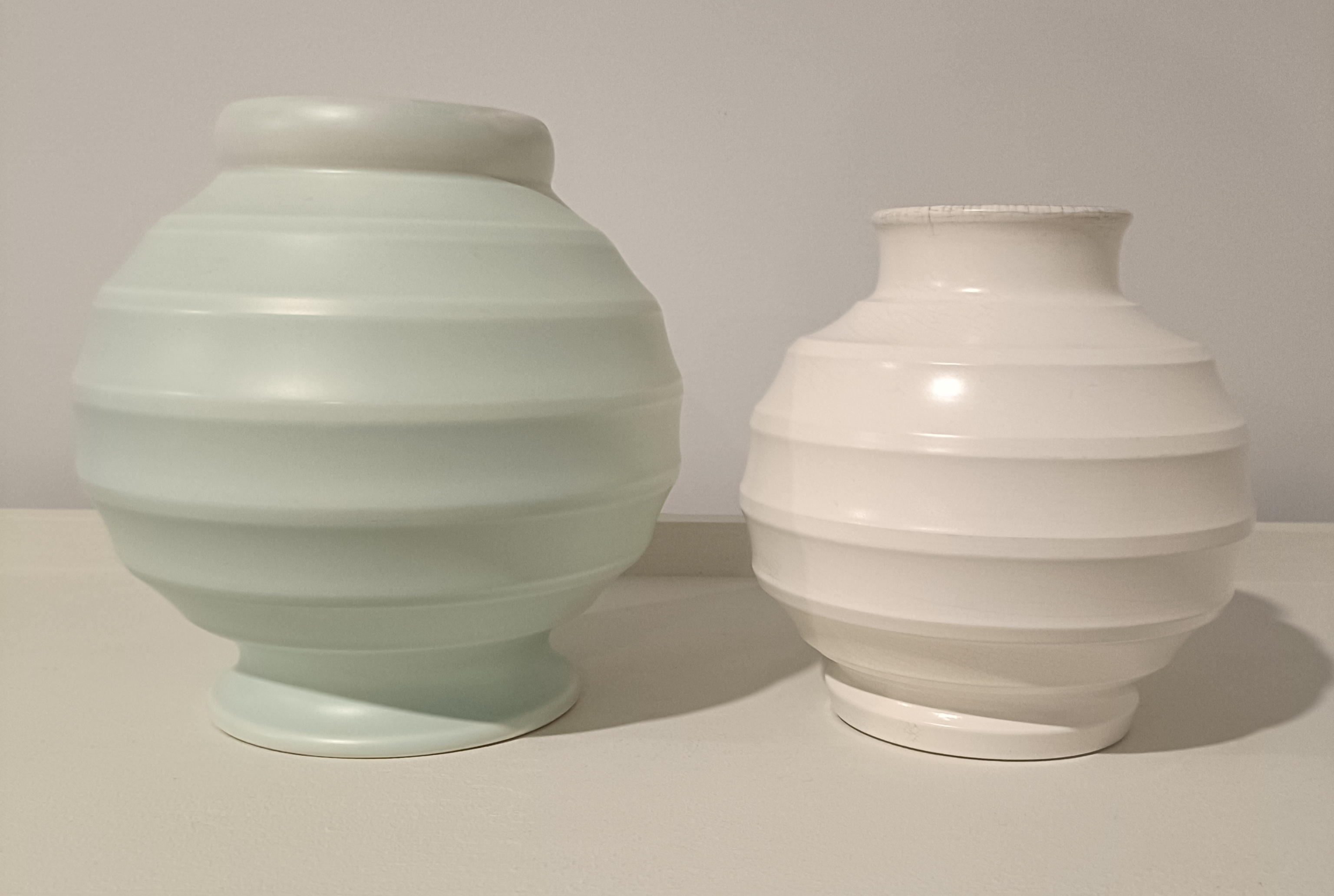
Crown Lynn handpotted vase attributed to Ernest Shufflebotham (left), next to a Keith Murray-designed vase for Wedgwood (right) made during the period that Shufflebotham made vases for Wedgwood

Shufflebotham was trained by Keith Murray, a New Zealand-born ceramic designer, while at Wedgwood in England. He developed into a skilled thrower and was a key interpreter of Murray's designs.

In 1948 Shufflebotham was brought to New Zealand by Crown Lynn along with a number of other designers including Frank Carpay to work in the company's 'Specials Department'. He was employed to produce more upmarket works that would expand the market for Crown Lynn ceramics. He was one of the few professional throwers in New Zealand during the period from his arrival in 1948 to his departure in October 1955 when he returned to England with his family.

He continued the 'machined' style used by Murray and would throw the clay on a pottery wheel to create the vase. His assistant would then turn it on a lathe to produce the indentations. The matt white finish of his work was made possible by Crown Lynn's 1948 development of a formula based on halloysitic clay from Matauri Bay. These works were variations on those he had thrown at Wedgwood.

His work has influenced New Zealand potters, in particular the potter John Parker.

== List of works ==
- Works in the collection of the Museum of New Zealand Te Papa Tongarewa
- Works in the collection of Auckland War Memorial Museum Tāmaki Paenga Hira
