= Mirek Smíšek =

New Zealand potter (1925–2013)

Mirek Smíšek OBE
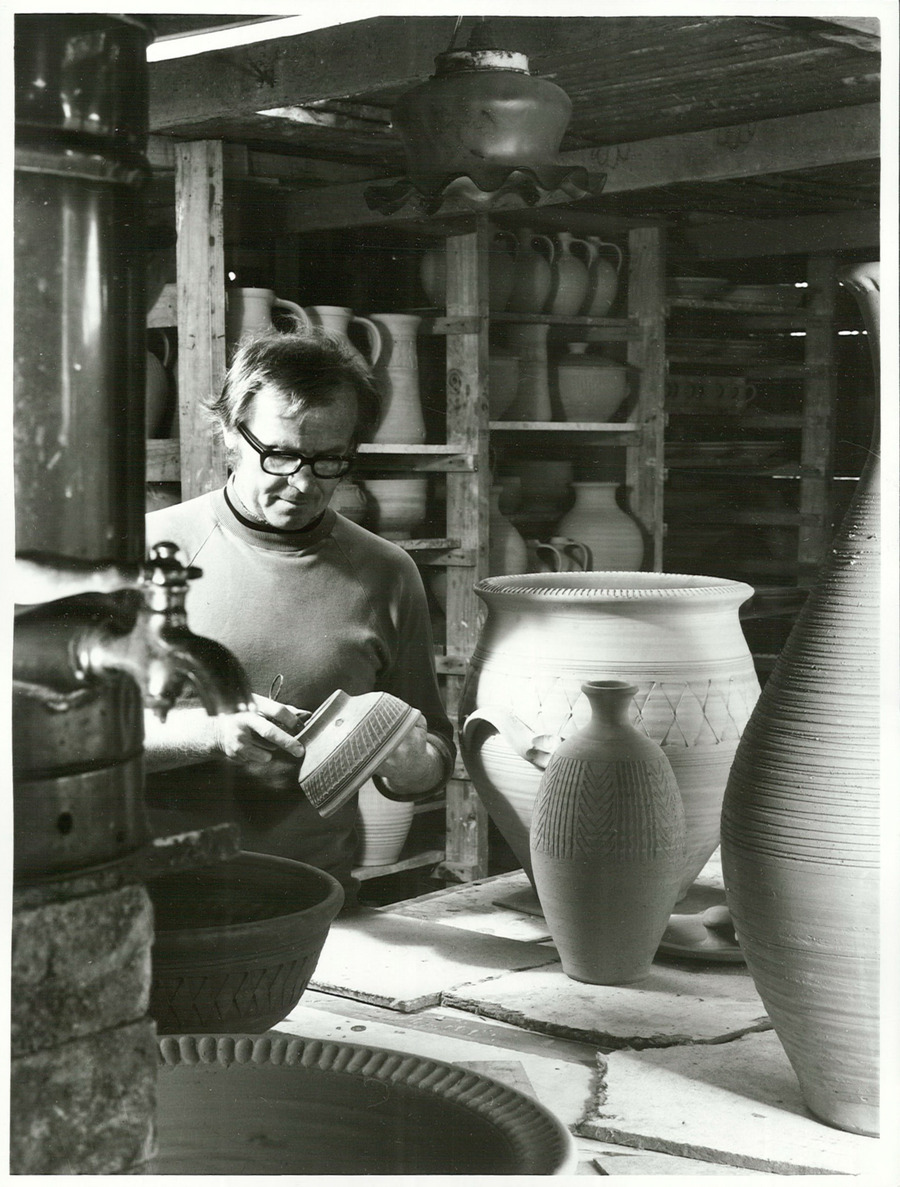
- Smíšek examining a pot, January 1973
- Born: Miroslav Smíšek; 2 February 1925; Malá Dobrá, Czechoslovakia
- Died: 19 May 2013 (aged 88); Wellington, New Zealand
- Known for: Pottery
- Partner: Pamella Annsouth
- Awards: Gratis Agit Award (2011)

Miroslav Smíšek OBE (2 February 1925 – 19 May 2013) was a New Zealand potter. After fleeing the Czech coup and eventually arriving in New Zealand, he started work for Crown Lynn and later established his own pottery. His two pottery kilns in Te Horo are scheduled as a category 2 historic place by Heritage New Zealand.

== Biography ==
Smíšek was born in Malá Dobrá (today an integral part of Velká Dobrá) in Czechoslovakia on 2 February 1925. He then moved with his family to Česká Lípa and then to Lysá nad Labem. He also studied in Nymburk. After spending most of World War II in labour camps due to his efforts in the anti-Nazi resistance movement, he fled Europe after the Czech coup. He emigrated first to Canberra, Australia in 1948 and worked in the brickwork industry whilst attending pottery classes, and later worked at Diana Pottery in Sydney. He then got married and moved to Auckland, New Zealand in 1951, and became a naturalised New Zealand citizen in 1955.

He worked for the Crown Lynn pottery in Auckland where he created the "Bohemia Ware" line in manganese slip glaze, before moving to Nelson in 1952. There he worked at the Nelson Brick and Pipe Company, where he learned the technique of salt glazing. He left in the mid to late 1950s and became New Zealand's first full-time studio potter making his own pieces and starting to teach. He taught pottery at the Nelson Technical School (at the time part of Nelson College) and night classes at Waimea College. In 1962 he went to Japan and studied at Kyoto University. In 1963 he went to St Ives in England and studied under Bernard Leach. He came back to New Zealand in 1965 and worked with Shoji Hamada in Christchurch. In 1968 he moved to the Kāpiti Coast, where he established three potteries. He purchased a property in Te Horo to establish a pottery work. Potter Pamella Annsouth became his partner in 1979 and remained with him until his death.

He worked extensively for The Lord of the Rings film trilogy, making about 700 earthenware items for the three films. Frequently he had to make two or three of each piece in different sizes to allow them to be used by the hobbits, humans and giants.

Smíšek's work was exhibited by the Victoria and Albert Museum, London in 1972. In the 1990 Queen's Birthday Honours, Smíšek was appointed an Officer of the Order of the British Empire, for services to pottery. He received the Gratis Agit award from the Czech government in 2011 for promoting the Czech Republic overseas.

== Beehive kilns ==
One of the beehive kilns in 1973

Smíšek's two beehive kilns in Te Horo are registered as a category 2 historic place by Heritage New Zealand. Also included is an 1880s shed and part of the Te Horo railway station that served as part of the pottery works. The kilns were built by Smíšek in 1970 and 1971. The kilns are 2.25 m (7 ft 5 in) high internally, are located on a circular concrete base, have an opening with a voussoir. A brick flue connected the two at one point. Their capacity is approximately 4.2 m^{3} (150 cu ft). The kilns are made out of approximately 4,000 bricks and had to be individually altered to form the kiln. The shed is painted red and was relocated by Smíšek.

In 2020–2021, the two beehive kilns that Smíšek had built and used for some 40 years were directly in the path of the new Peka Peka to Otaki (PP2O) Expressway. The New Zealand Transport Agency agreed to preserve the kilns and carefully moved them to a nearby location. The kilns were dismantled and reassembled brick by brick 20 metres east of where they originally lay. This dismantling resulted in the kilns no longer being functional. The move and refurbishment has been documented by local artist Elisabeth Vullings. The Mirek Smisek Arts Trust is now developing plans to build an arts centre centred on the relocated kilns.

== Legacy ==
Smíšek died in Wellington in 2013. At the time of his death, a retrospective exhibition "60 Years 60 Pots" was touring New Zealand. The exhibition was held by Te Whare o Rehua Sarjeant Gallery from 18 February to 1 April 2012, and it displayed curator Gary Freemantle's choice of Smíšek's works over time as his skills in glazing and design changed. A number of his pieces are held in the Museum of New Zealand Te Papa Tongarewa. Much of his practice was compiled and written about by Stan Jenkins between 1978 and 1982 in Mirek Smisek: Potter.
