= Lyall Holmes =

New Zealand structural engineer

Ivan Lyall Holmes (16 October 1920 – 26 August 1970) was a New Zealand structural engineer whose advances in concrete masonry building methods in the 1950s and 1960s were central to the avant-garde style of modernist architecture known as New Brutalism which emerged in the 1950s. It was epitomised locally in the work of architects such as Miles Warren, Maurice Mahoney (Warren & Mahoney) and Paul Pascoe.

Holmes engineered many of Canterbury's first modernist buildings including the Dorset Street Flats, the SIMU building, the Students' Association building at the University of Canterbury, and the Christchurch Town Hall. He also worked in Vanuatu (then called the New Hebrides) and the Solomon Islands engineering hospitals, schools, a Government House and a cathedral.

Holmes was 49 when he died during construction of the Christchurch Town Hall.

== Early years: 1920 to 1947 ==
Holmes was born in Wellington on 16 October 1920 to Ivan Milo and Agnes Hay (née Lyall). He attended Wellington College (New Zealand) from 1934 to 1938. He then started engineering studies at Victoria University College in Wellington in 1939 and transferred to Canterbury University College in Christchurch in 1940 where he completed a Bachelor of Engineering (Civil) in 1942.

For the next four years Holmes lectured in civil engineering; his areas of expertise were Hydraulics, the design and theory of structures, and estimates and contracts. He was keenly interested in the standard of engineering education and was described as a "tower of strength" by his former student Robert Park, who went on to become a world-renowned earthquake engineer.

== From academic to consultant: 1947 to 1956 ==
In February 1945, he was awarded a Post-graduate Travelling Scholarship in Engineering, which he took up two years later. In May 1947, he boarded the SS Mahana to work his passage as a deck boy to England. In the interim, he had co-designed with Paul Pascoe a house in Christchurch for his widowed mother and had married Helen Jobberns, the elder daughter of Professor George Jobberns, the first chair of the Geography Department at Canterbury College.

In London, Holmes landed a job as one of its first employees at the new London-based civil and structural engineering consultancy, Ove Arup and Partners, known for its work with modern architects, its designing of unusual structures and its development of new structural techniques and materials.

In June 1952 the family boarded the R.M.S. Orontes, having made appointments at ports along the way for Holmes to receive treatment.

When Holmes returned to the university in 1952 he was initially successful in juggling his university lecturing work with private commissions but by the mid 1950s his private work had begun to dominate and he was told by Harry Hopkins, Chair of Engineering, that it was time to choose. Holmes chose private practice and in 1956, at age 35, established what is now known as Holmes Consulting Group. Two years later he was diagnosed with angina.

== Building a successful consultancy: 1956 to 1970 ==
The new firm's first commission was for the Christchurch Airport Terminal.

In 1958 Holmes worked on his first project with a young Miles Warren – the Dental Nurses’ Training School in Christchurch. Warren later recalled that meeting Lyall Holmes was one of the best things to come out of that project and was immediately impressed by the young engineer. The Holmes/Warren & Mahoney relationship continued until Holmes' death in 1970 and resulted in many important Canterbury buildings – combining the architects' passion for the cutting edge modernist style with Holmes' enthusiasm for bold new construction methods and sophisticated seismic design.

In his book Miles Warren – An Autobiography, Miles Warren makes a point of sharing the credit for his success and fame not just with his less high-profile but "true" partner Maurice Mahoney but the engineer who helped make so many of their ambitious designs possible. "[Lyall] was a most creative structural designer and good friend who became an essential member of the team." The relationship took a new turn in 1964, when the pair began designing buildings in the Solomon Islands and Vanuatu. Holmes, whose angina was now beginning to affect his stamina, found it easier to work in the warmer climate, and at the time of his death in August 1970 was hoping to build a house and office in Vanuatu to make his headquarters.

During this period Holmes and Miles Warren initiated and designed College House, a hall of residence for students at the University of Canterbury.

== Structural design breakthroughs ==
In the 1950s, Lyall Holmes was part of an engineering elite at Canterbury University that questioned whether standard building practices of the time were delivering buildings that could withstand a major earthquake.

Multi-storey buildings were then constructed using a reinforced concrete frame of columns and beams with brick infill panels. Holmes and his colleagues believed that in a major earthquake these rigid outer walls, which were poorly connected to the relatively flexible inner frame, would take the brunt of the seismic forces in a major earthquake, causing them to "shatter, fall and destroy the building.", As a practising engineer Holmes was now in a position to put some new ideas into practice and has been credited with starting the widespread use of concrete masonry in New Zealand by being the first to test the theory that stiff reinforced concrete walls should be used to take the major lateral earthquake forces, leaving the columns to carry only the vertical load or "dead weight" of the building,

One of his most significant projects in this regard was Warren & Mahoney's Dorset Street Flats completed in 1957. This was New Zealand's first residential building made of reinforced concrete block – a "pioneering" example of this construction method and seen as "one of the most important "Modern Movement" buildings in New Zealand (Clark, J & Walker, P, 2000).

Three years later, Holmes' structural design for the Chapman Block at Christ's College, also designed by Warren & Mahoney, featured four cross-walls of load-bearing reinforced concrete block – the first time this had been used in anything other than a domestic building in Christchurch. "Concrete beams and floor slabs spanning between the walls were all fair face concrete," architect Miles Warren later wrote of the Chapman Block. "There was no plaster anywhere. The earthquake load in the opposite direction to the main walls was taken by a thick central fair face concrete shear wall.” Holmes took these new methods another step forward in the mid 1960s with the Warren & Mahoney-designed SIMU (South Island Mutual Union) building in Latimer Square. His breakthrough here was to place the service cores of stairs and toilets at each end of the building to create "stiff tubes" to take the major earthquake load – the job of the outside walls and sparse central columns was now simply to hold the building up. “It is all standard practice now, but it was innovative then," Miles Warren wrote later. The Canterbury University Students Association building, completed in 1967, was another Warren & Mahoney design that featured Holmes' structural design. Described at its opening as a "skeletal encrustation", the building was, Miles Warren later recalled, a "construction tour de force" using exposed pre-cast concrete and pre-stressed post-tensioned beams and columns. “It went beyond the [Building] Code" said renowned earthquake engineer Robert Park. One of the buildings Lyall Holmes is most remembered for is the one that was still being built when he died. The Christchurch Town Hall was a landmark building of its time – the first completely new town hall to be built in New Zealand for 50 years and one that has been said to have influenced international architecture "like no other building in New Zealand" (Cairns, 2012). Lyall Holmes worked in an era termed by Australian critic Robin Boyd the "engineering of excitement". Sadly many of the landmark buildings engineered by Lyall Holmes in the 1950s and 1960s were deemed uneconomic to repair in the catastrophic Christchurch earthquake of 22 February 2011.

== Important buildings with structural design by Lyall Holmes ==
- Christchurch Airport Terminal (completed 1960). Architect: Paul Pascoe.
- Dorset Street Flats, Christchurch (completed 1957). Architect: Miles Warren. First residential building built of reinforced concrete block and regarded as one of New Zealand’s “most important Modern Movement” buildings (Halliday & Whybrew, 2010)
- Graham House, Rockinghorse Rd, Christchurch (completed 1958). Architect: Paul Pascoe. The striking feature of this beachside house was the enormous hyperboloid aluminium roof manufactured in one piece and shipped from Australia for the project (Christchurch Modern, 2008).
- Chapman Block, Christ’s College, Christchurch (completed 1962) (W&M website) Architect: Warren & Mahoney. The first non-domestic building in Christchurch to be built using load-bearing reinforced concrete block.
- College House, Ilam, Christchurch (completed 1964). Architect: Warren & Mahoney.
- Canterbury University Students’ Association, Christchurch (1967) Architect: Warren & Mahoney
- British Secondary School, Vila, New Hebrides (1964) Architect: Warren & Mahoney.
- Government Life Building, Cathedral Square (1960) Architect Paul Pascoe.
- Automobile Association building in Hereford Street (1961). Architect: Hall & Mackenzie
- Christchurch Town Hall (completed 1970). Architect: Warren & Mahoney.
- Government House, Honiara (1965). Architect: Warren & Mahoney
- Jellicoe Towers, Wellington (1965). Architect: Allan Wild.

== List of papers published by Lyall Holmes ==
- Holmes, I. L. (1947). Steeds Memorial Hut Handbook: Arthur's Pass, Southern Alps. Christchurch: Raven Press.
- Holmes, I. L. (1961). Load bearing masonry design. N.Z. Engineering, 16(1), 23.
- Holmes, I. L. (1963). Earthquake and concrete masonry. N.Z. Institute of Architects Journal, 30(3), 43.
- Holmes, I. L. (1965). Concrete masonry buildings in New Zealand. Paper presented at the Proceedings of the Third World Conference on Earthquake Engineering (3WCEE), Auckland & Wellington, NZ.
- Holmes, I. L. (1967). Masonry building in high intensity seismic zones. Paper presented at the International Conference on Masonry Structural Systems, Austin, TX.
- Holmes, I. L. (1968). Masonry building in high intensity seismic zones: IL Holmes.
- Holmes, I. L. (1968). Masonry construction for earthquake. Bulletin of the New Zealand Society for Earthquake Engineering, 1(1), xvi.
- Holmes, I. L. (1968). Reinforced masonry in New Zealand. Australian Civil Engineering, 9(2), 45.
- Holmes, I. L. (1970). Concrete masonry in New Zealand – rational structural design of reinforced masonry. Concrete, 4(9), 358.
