= Don Donnithorne =

New Zealand architect (1926–2016)

Don Donnithorne MBE
- Born: 31 July 1926
- Died: 5 August 2016 (aged 90); Christchurch, New Zealand
- Occupation: Architect
- Spouse: Dawn Donnithorne (m. 1949)

Donald Ewart Donnithorne MBE (31 July 1926 – 5 August 2016) was a New Zealand architect based in Christchurch.

Born on 31 July 1926, and raised in Timaru, Donnithorne was the son of hotelkeepers. Following World War II he studied architecture by correspondence in the "Christchurch Atelier"', instead of travelling to the only architecture school in New Zealand at that time in Auckland. His student contemporaries included Miles Warren and Peter Beaven, and the three would go on to become the most significant figures in Christchurch architecture of the second half of the 20th century, producing works with clean, modernist lines. However, unlike Warren and Maurice Mahoney, who were strongly influenced by brutalism, Donnithorne followed Scandinavian cues in his work.

One of Donnithorne's earliest designs was for the Evangelistic Temple, at the corner of Colombo Street and Moorhouse Avenue in Christchurch. His later works included the Wigram Air Force Museum, the Netball Centre in Hagley Park, and the Millbrook Apartments in Carlton Mill Road. Donnithorne's residential work included the Romeni house in the suburb of Cashmere, for which he was awarded a New Zealand Institute of Architects national award in 1979.

In the 1987 Queen's Birthday Honours, Donnithorne was appointed a Member of the Order of the British Empire, for services to architecture. He was also a Fellow of the New Zealand Institute of Architects.

In the 1989 local elections, Donnithorne stood in the Hagley ward of Christchurch City Council as part of the Christchurch Action ticket formed by Margaret Murray. He came fifth of six candidates in the ward that returned two councillors.

In 2012, Donnithorne published a book, entitled Don Donnithorne: an architectural journey, of his watercolours of places that he had visited.

Donnithorne died in Christchurch on 5 August 2016 at the age of 90. His widow, Gloria Dawn Janet Donnithorne, to whom he was married in 1949, died on 26 May 2019.
