= Christchurch Style architecture =

Architectural style that emerged in 1960s New Zealand

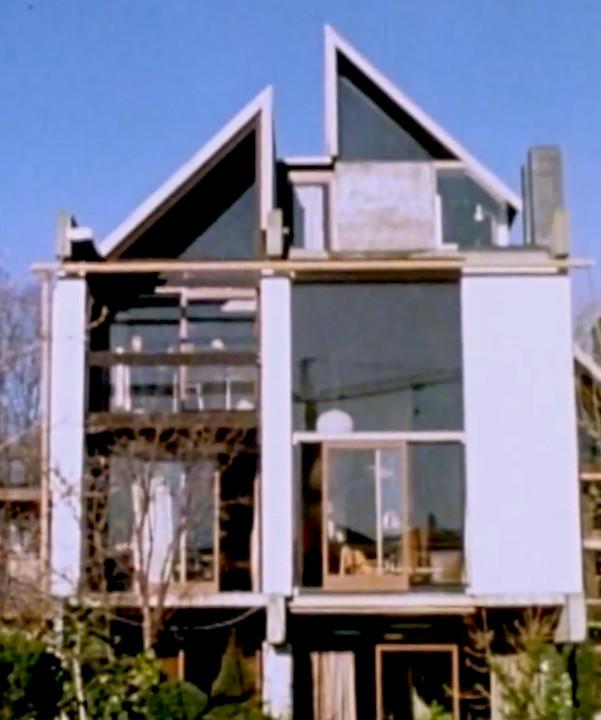
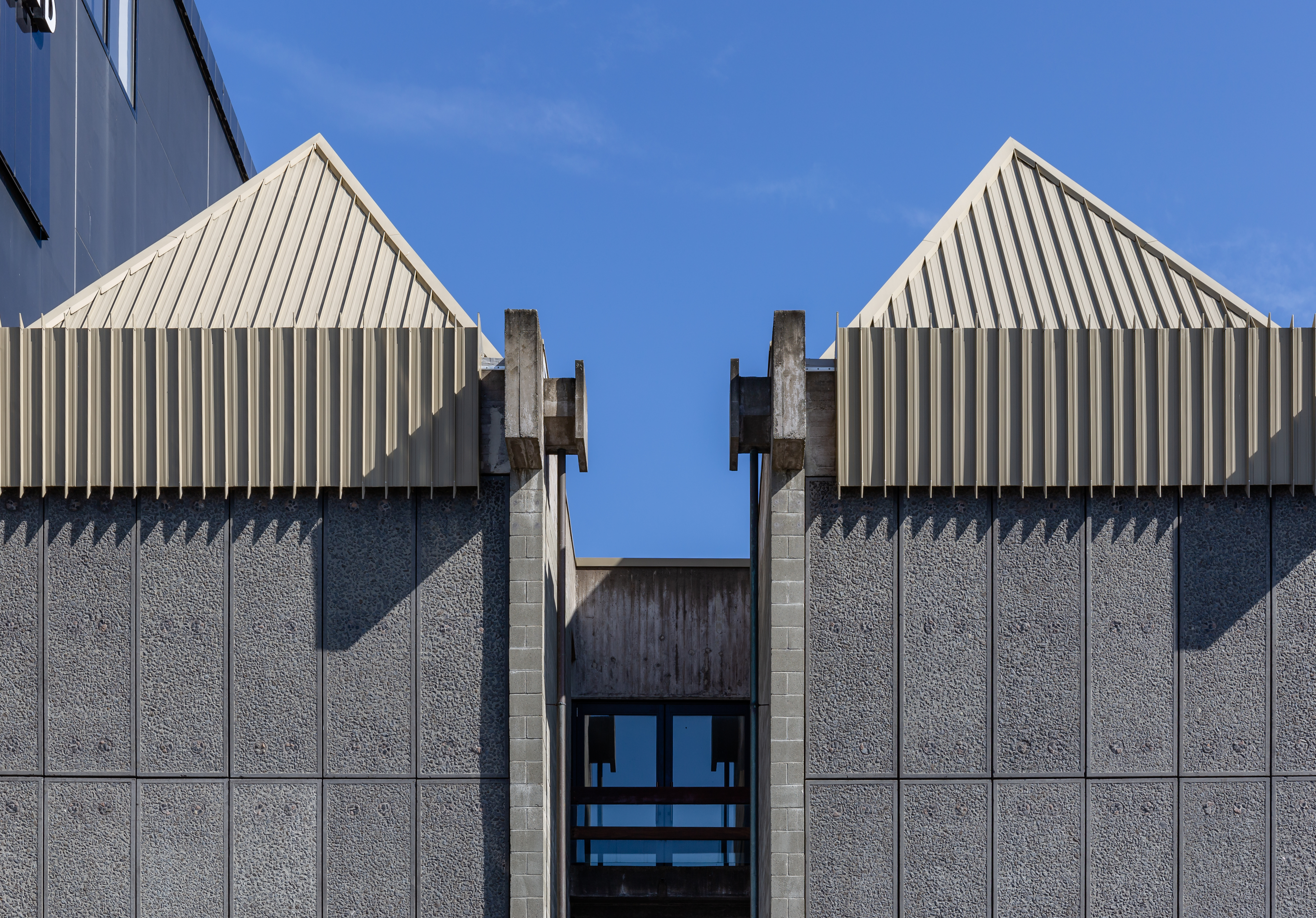
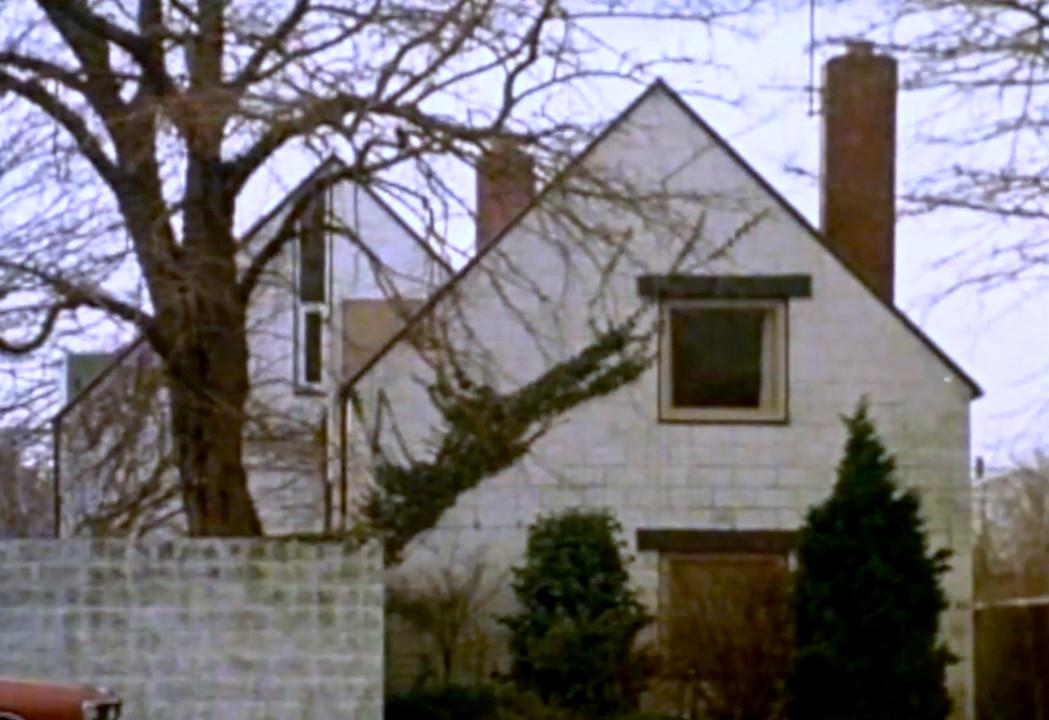
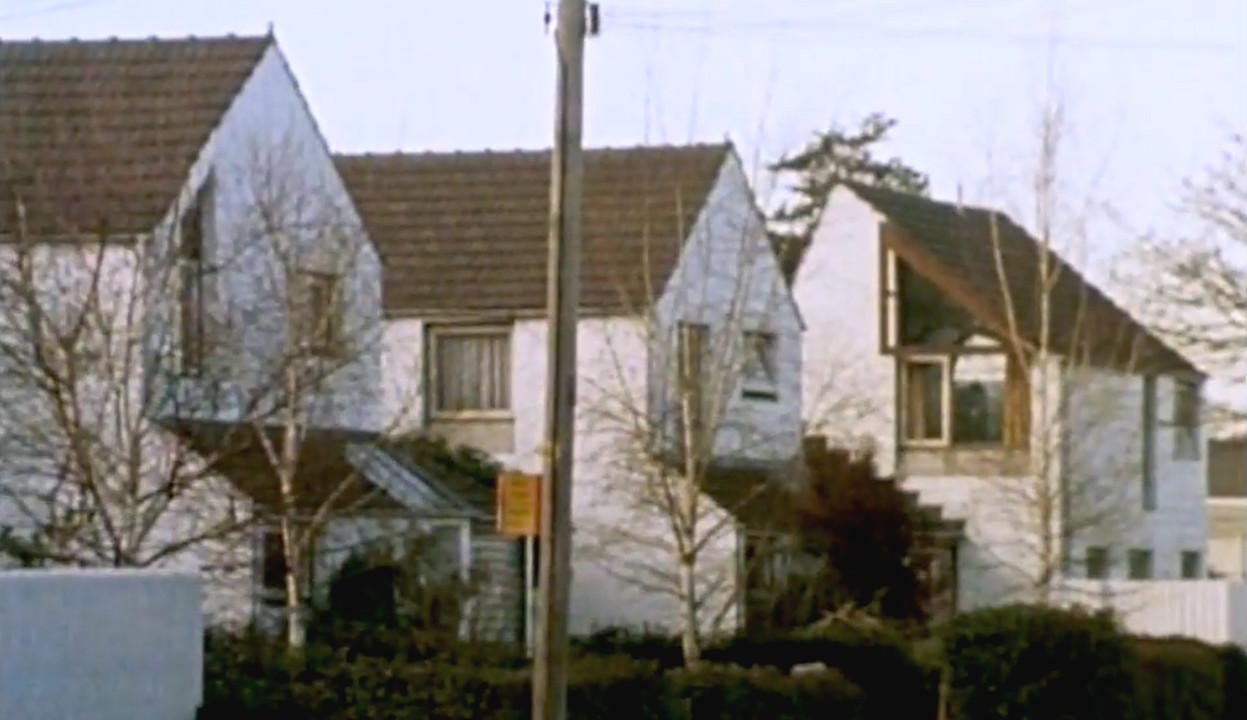
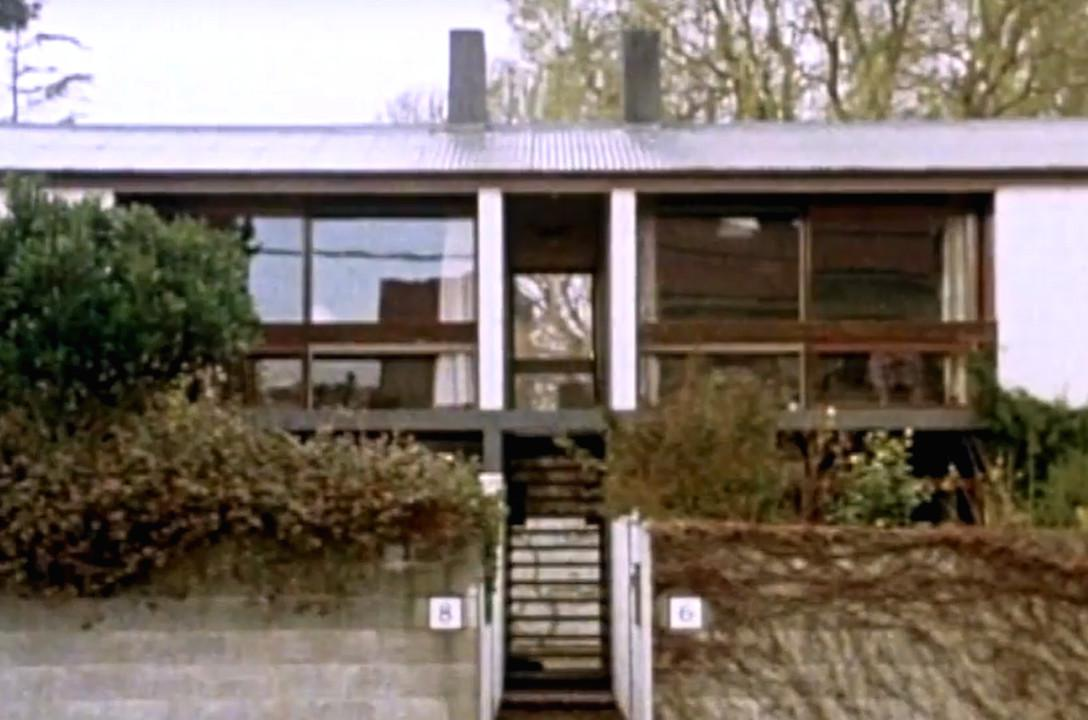
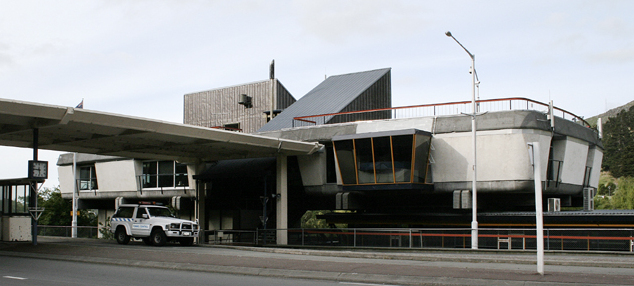
- From top, left to right: 65 Cambridge Terrace (1962) by Warren and Mahoney, Centre of Contemporary Art by Minson, Hansen and Dines (1968), 40 Rhodes Street (1962) by Warren and Mahoney, Rossall Street townhouses by Peter Beaven, Dorset Street Flats (1957) by Miles Warren, Lyttelton Road Tunnel Administration Building (1964) by Beaven
- Years active: Late 1950s–early-to-mid 1980s
- Location: New Zealand
- Influences: Brutalist, Modernist, Scandinavian

Christchurch Style architecture (also referred to as the Christchurch Movement and the Christchurch School) is an architectural style and movement that began in the late 1950s in Christchurch, New Zealand. It is considered New Zealand's only example of a modern, locally-developed architectural vernacular. Its inception is credited to the post-war architects of Christchurch who developed it as a regional response to the modernist style, particularly Miles Warren, Maurice Mahoney, Peter Beaven, Don Donnithorne, among others.

Christchurch Style is characterised by elements of New Brutalist architecture and practical, minimalist interiors influenced by mid-century American and Scandinavian aesthetics. It evolved from the modernist movement. In its later period, some architects adopted aspects of Gothic revival and the late functionalist elements of high-tech architecture from the 1970s. Typically, Christchurch School is used to refer to the mid-century modernist origins of the movement, while Christchurch Style more broadly involves the contemporary evolution, particularly with respect to commercial and public buildings. However, Warren and Beaven also broke modernist conventions in favour of eclectic and novel approaches seen in postmodernism. This blend of aesthetic practices distinguishes Christchurch Style against international variants of modernism.

Christchurch School architecture emerged in the late 1950s and was most prominent in the 1960s through to the 1970s. The influence of Christchurch Style buildings, such as Dorset Street Flats (1957), had a significant influence on New Zealand architectural design and construction approaches. The style was most prolific in its namesake of Christchurch, but also internationally, such as Beaven's Tile Kiln Studios in Highgate, London. Later examples in the 1970s and 1980s include townhouses and commercial towers built during the high-rise boom in Christchurch, with a shift towards postmodern ideals in form and design. Examples of the latter include the Christchurch Town Hall by Warren (1972) and the Centra Building by Beaven (1986), which reflects his interest in Gothic Revival.

Many original buildings built during the movement were demolished, either from neglect or as a result of the 2011 Christchurch earthquake. However, surviving examples of Christchurch Style houses have enjoyed renewed attention and appreciation in the 2020s, and interest in modernist architecture has endured in New Zealand in general. The legacy of Christchurch Style architecture continues to influence architects in the Canterbury region and New Zealand in general, particularly in terms of outer aesthetic, geometric lines and the principles of modernist layouts, albeit with a contemporary design language superseding Brutalist influence. Some architects have argued that Christchurch is experiencing a revival of Christchurch School in new residential commissions.

== Origins ==
The beginnings of Christchurch School are credited to Miles Warren, particularly the design and construction of Dorset Street Flats from 1956 to 1957. Warren had returned from a stint working at London County Council in the United Kingdom, where he was exposed to New Brutalism and got first-hand experience of Finn Juhl's work. In his design for Dorset Street Flats, he used flat lines, exposed concrete block, timber, and built-in furniture. His designs drew from principles of modernism and Brutalism, softened by a Scandinavian-style aesthetic, with an aim to make them functional, demonstrative of their materials, offset with the comfort of soft furnishings and well-planted gardens. The design vernacular was developed further in the design practice of Warren and Mahoney, founded in collaboration with Maurice Mahoney in 1958, and the influence became especially apparent in new projects developed in the 1960s.

Christchurch Style is widely credited to the post-war architects of Canterbury, including Warren, Mahoney, Don Donnithorne, and Peter Beaven, among others. Lesser cited contributors to the movement include Charles Thomas, Trengrove & Marshall, and Minson, Hansen & Dines.

== Characteristics ==
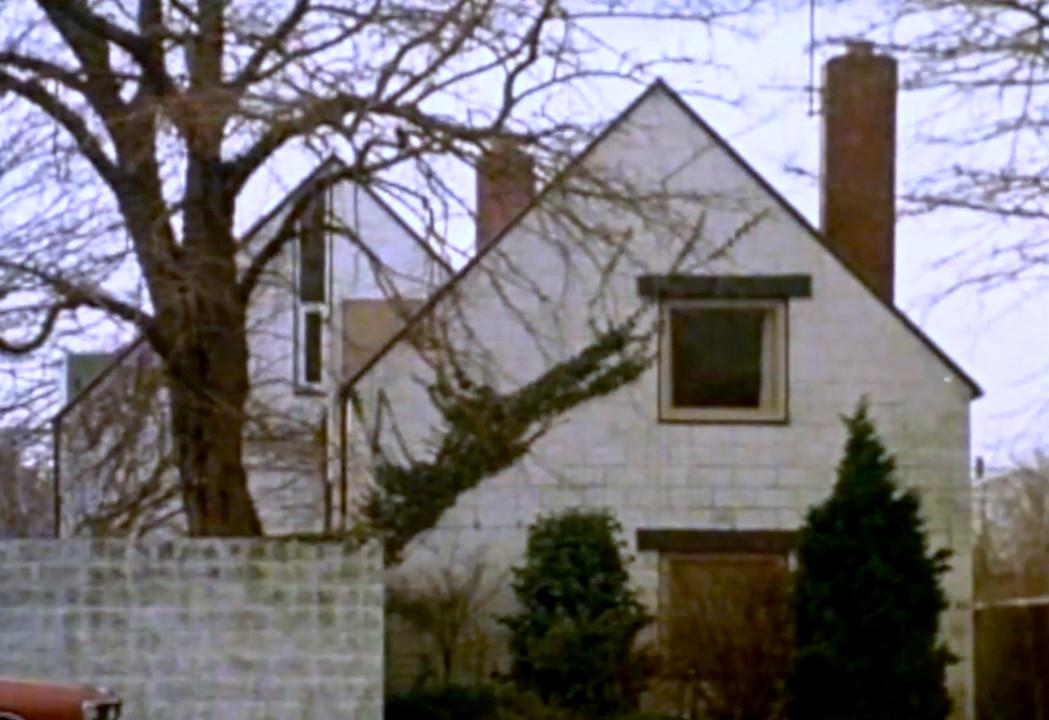
40 Rhodes Street features a pitched roof, chimney, strong symmetry and intentional window placement

Christchurch School is characterised by a design language based on modernism, influenced by aspects of New Brutalism, and interior design reflecting elements of Scandinavian and Japanese aesthetic, particularly the paired-back elements and use of interior timber. The buildings often feature strong lines, precise geometry, and honest presentation of materials including use of visible concrete. Many examples originally had modernist interiors with defining elements such as timber ceilings, concrete block walls, and modest but open spaces with an emphasis on function, sometimes including built-in furniture. Prominent chimneys and pitched roof lines and gables are also typical.

Evolving from this, Christchurch Style embraced postmodern principles, and late-modernist concepts from high-tech architecture. In particular, Beaven rejected aspects of modernism that he considered restrictive and opted for more expressive forms influenced by Gothic Revival, while Warren also shifted towards eclectic forms in his designs from the 1970s onward, particularly notable in his design of the Christchurch Town Hall. Donnithorne preferred to draw from Scandinavian influence, as opposed to the Brutalism. In this sense, Christchurch School is primarily used to discuss the design language developed in the 1950s and 60s with respect to modernism and New Brutalism, while Christchurch Style is more broadly used encompass the contemporary evolution in the later part of the century.

To date, the Christchurch Style vernacular is considered to be the only example of an indigenous architectural style and movement developed in modern New Zealand. Prior to this, architecture was largely dominated by European styles, effectively without adapting for local considerations such as materials, climate and social aspects.

== Examples ==
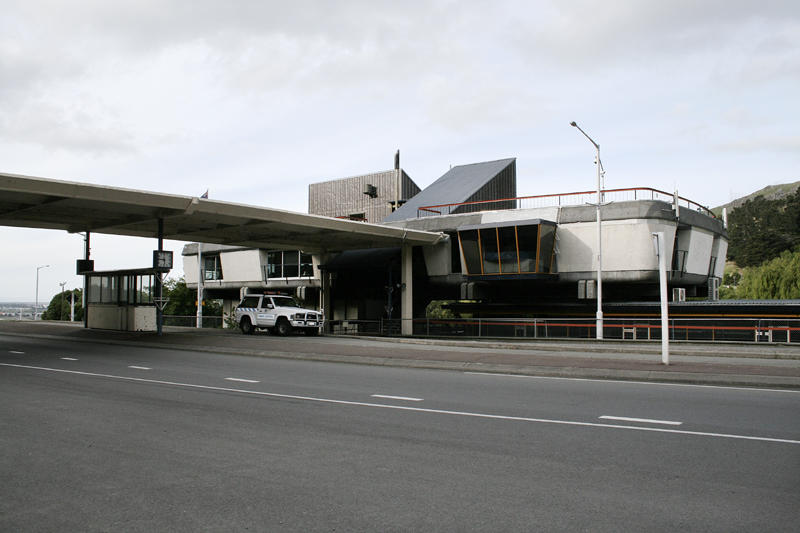
Lyttelton Tunnel Administration Building

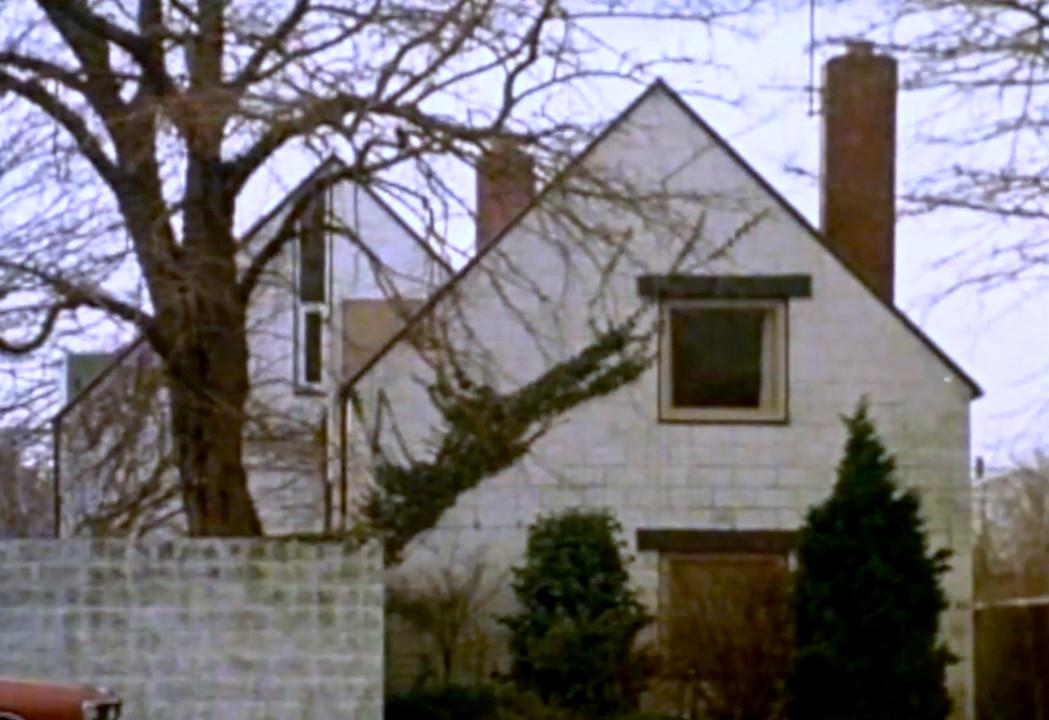
40 Rhodes Street

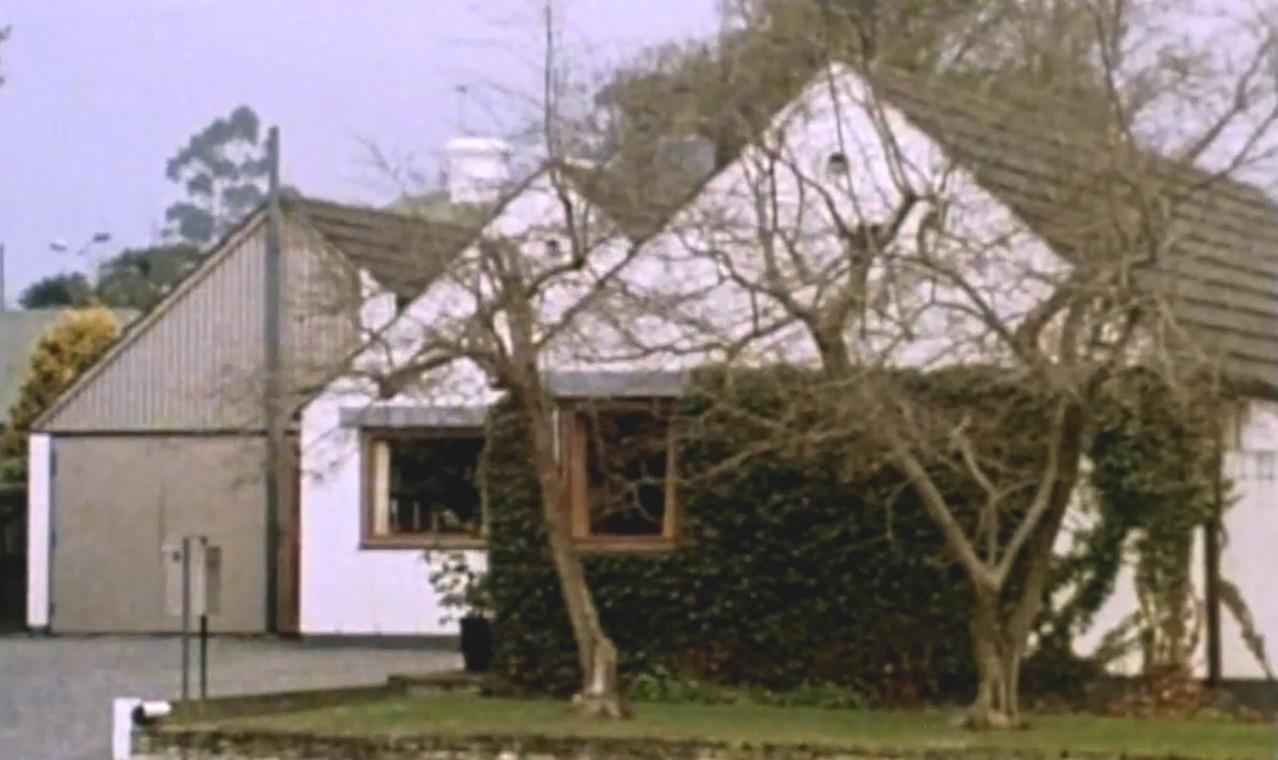
9 Queens Avenue

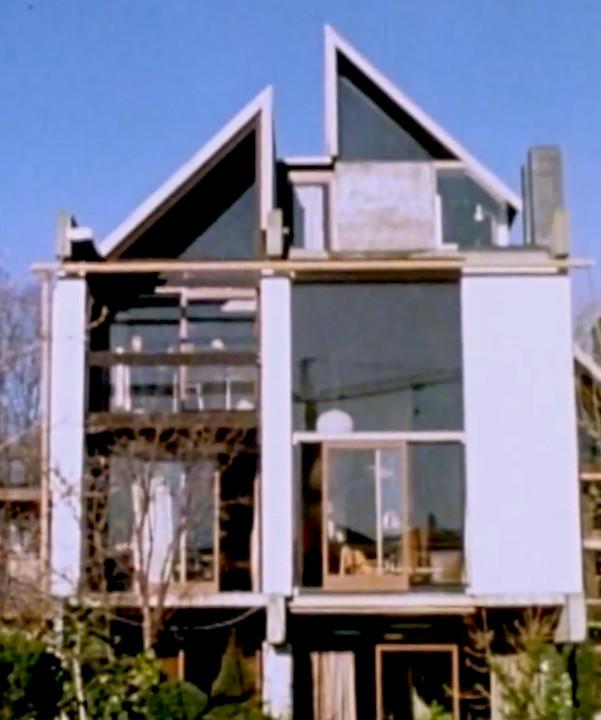
65 Cambridge Terrace

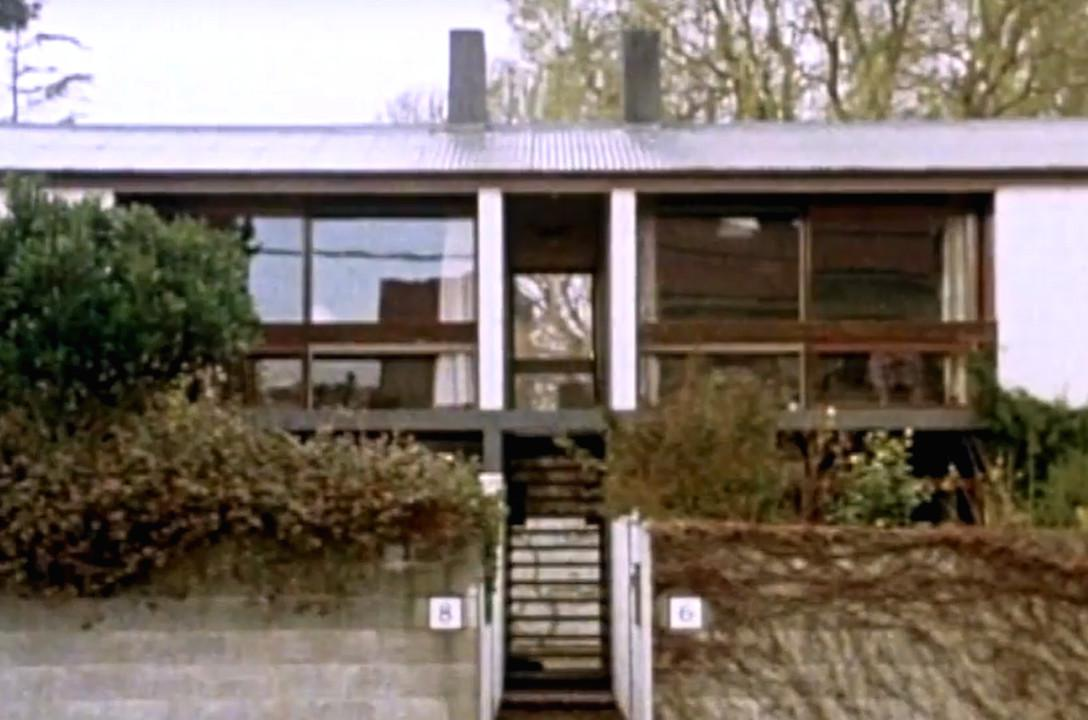
Dorset Street Flats

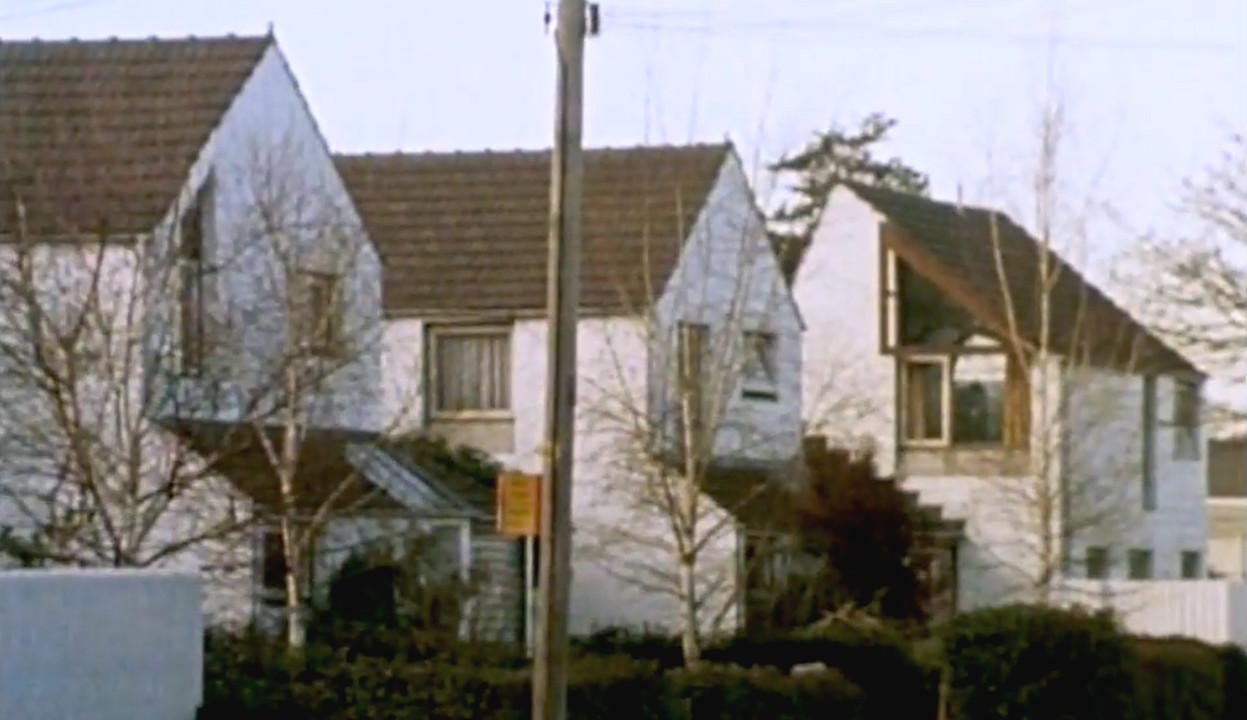
Rossall Street Townhouses

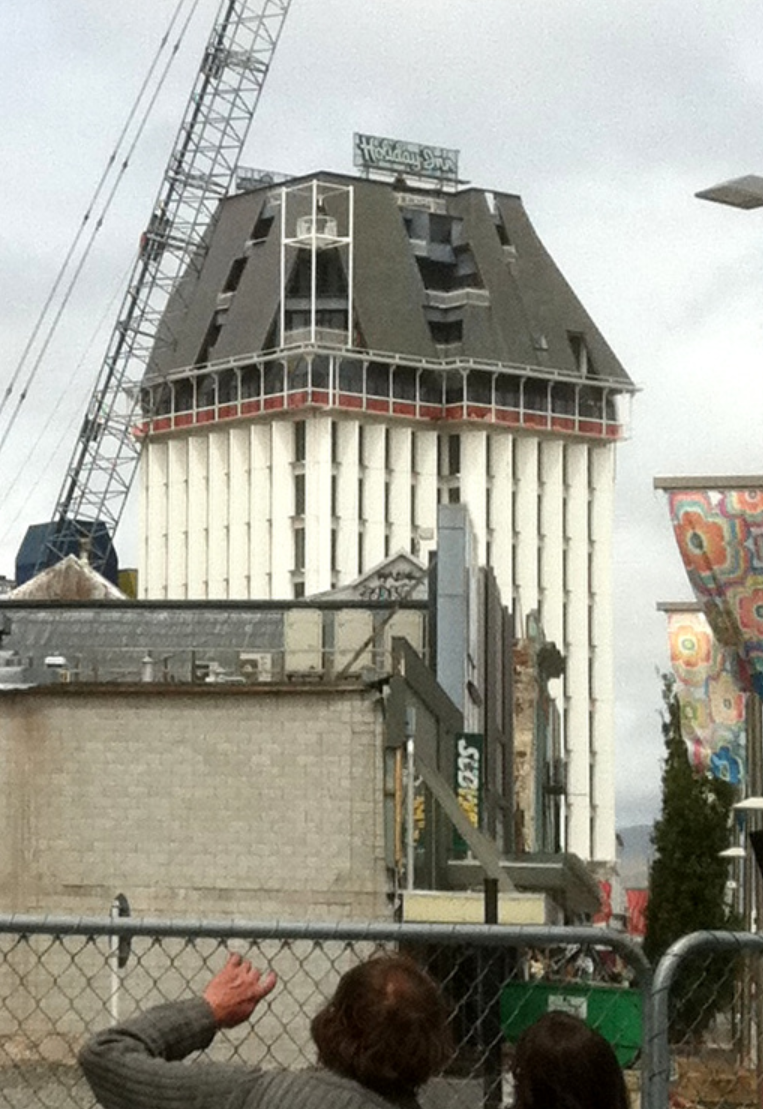
Centra Building

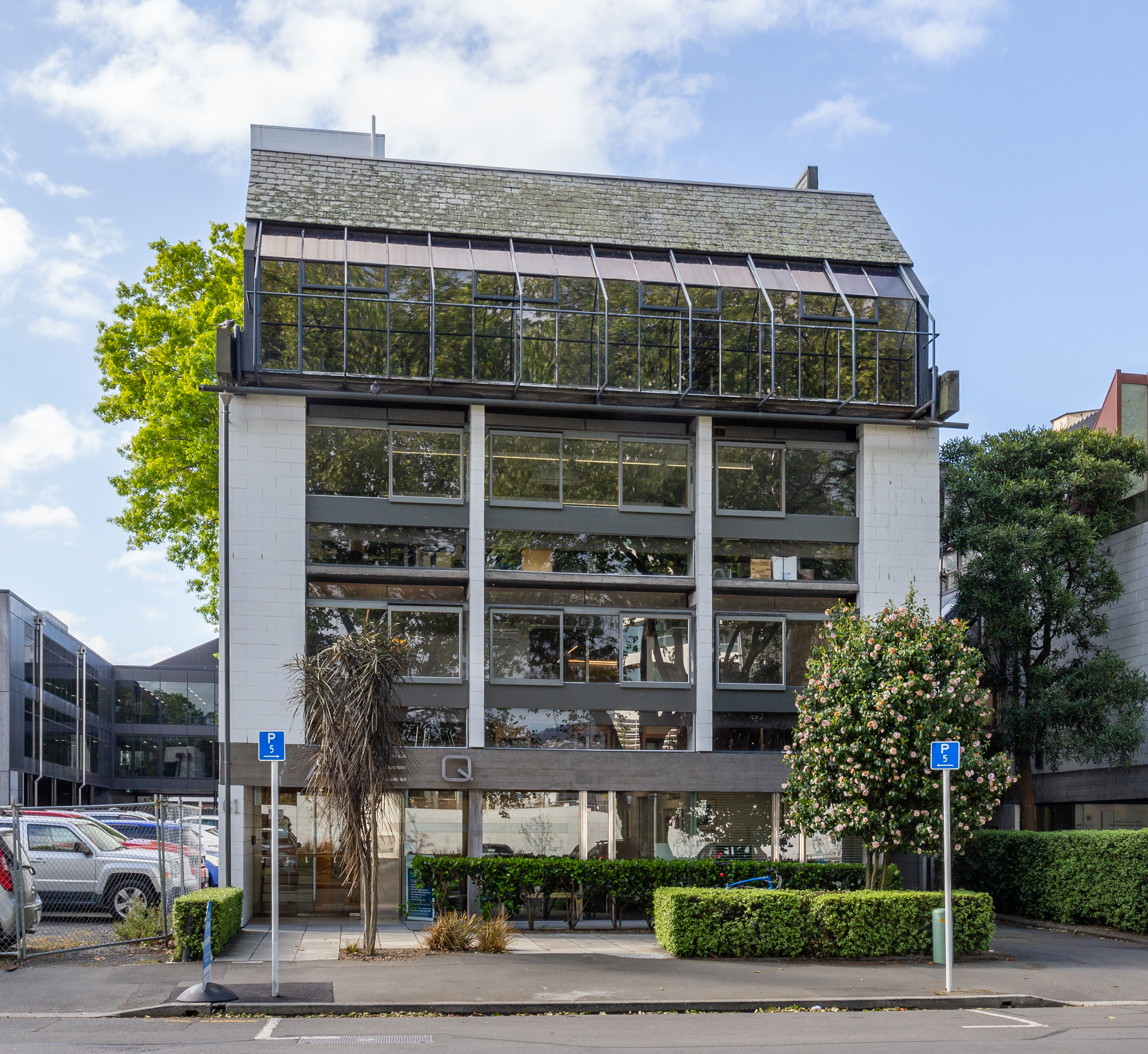
61 Cambridge Terrace

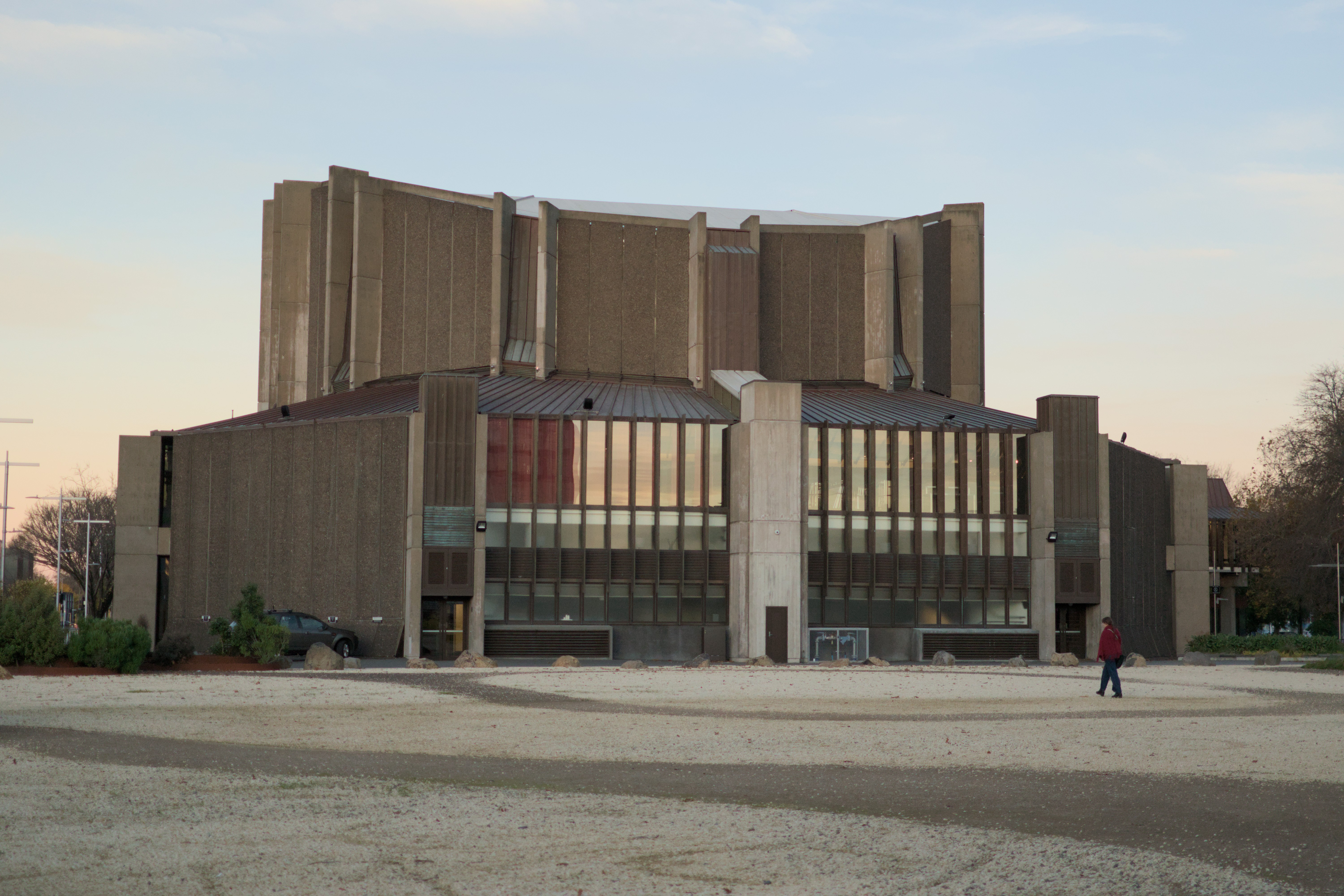
Christchurch Town Hall

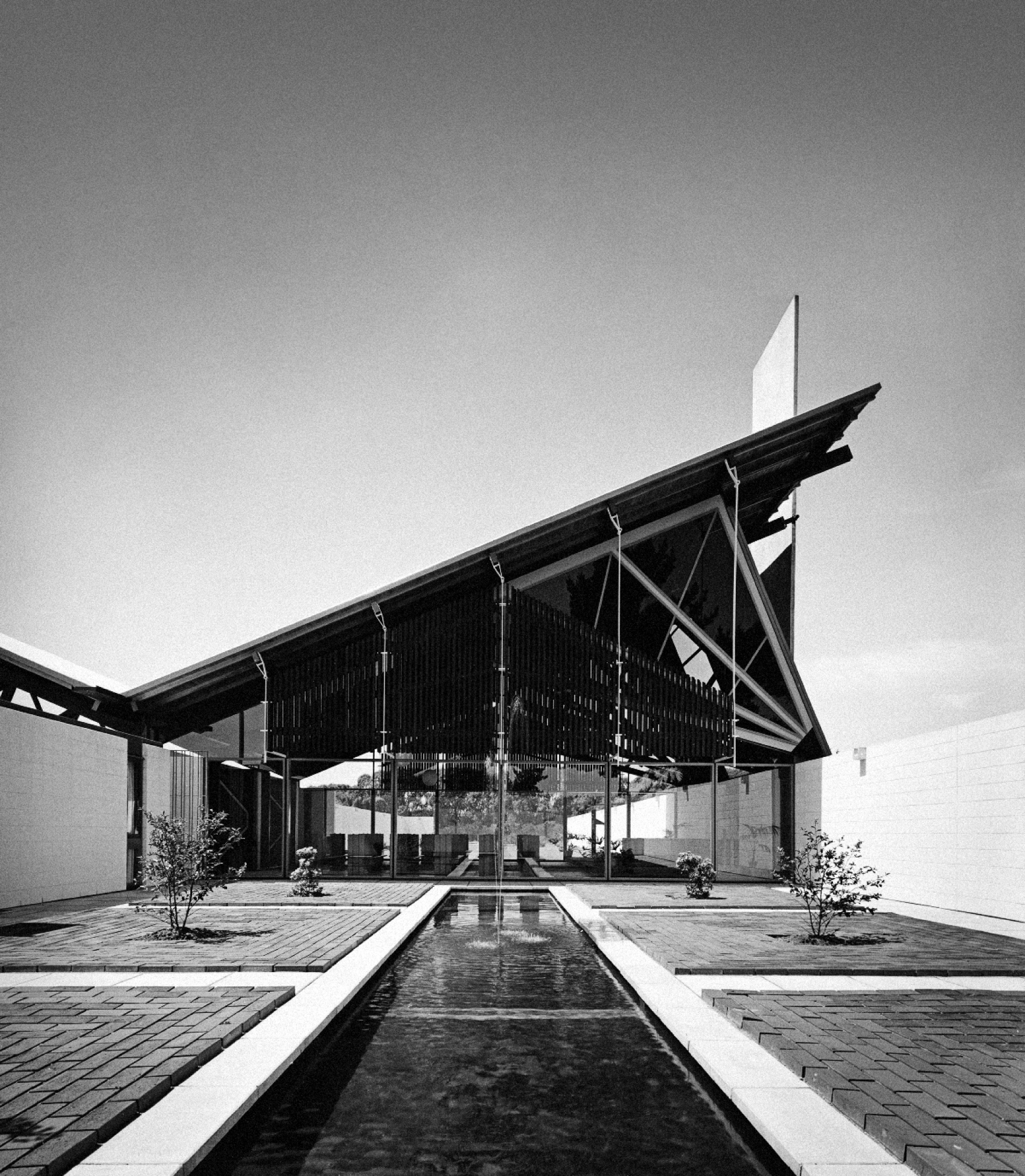
Harewood Crematorium

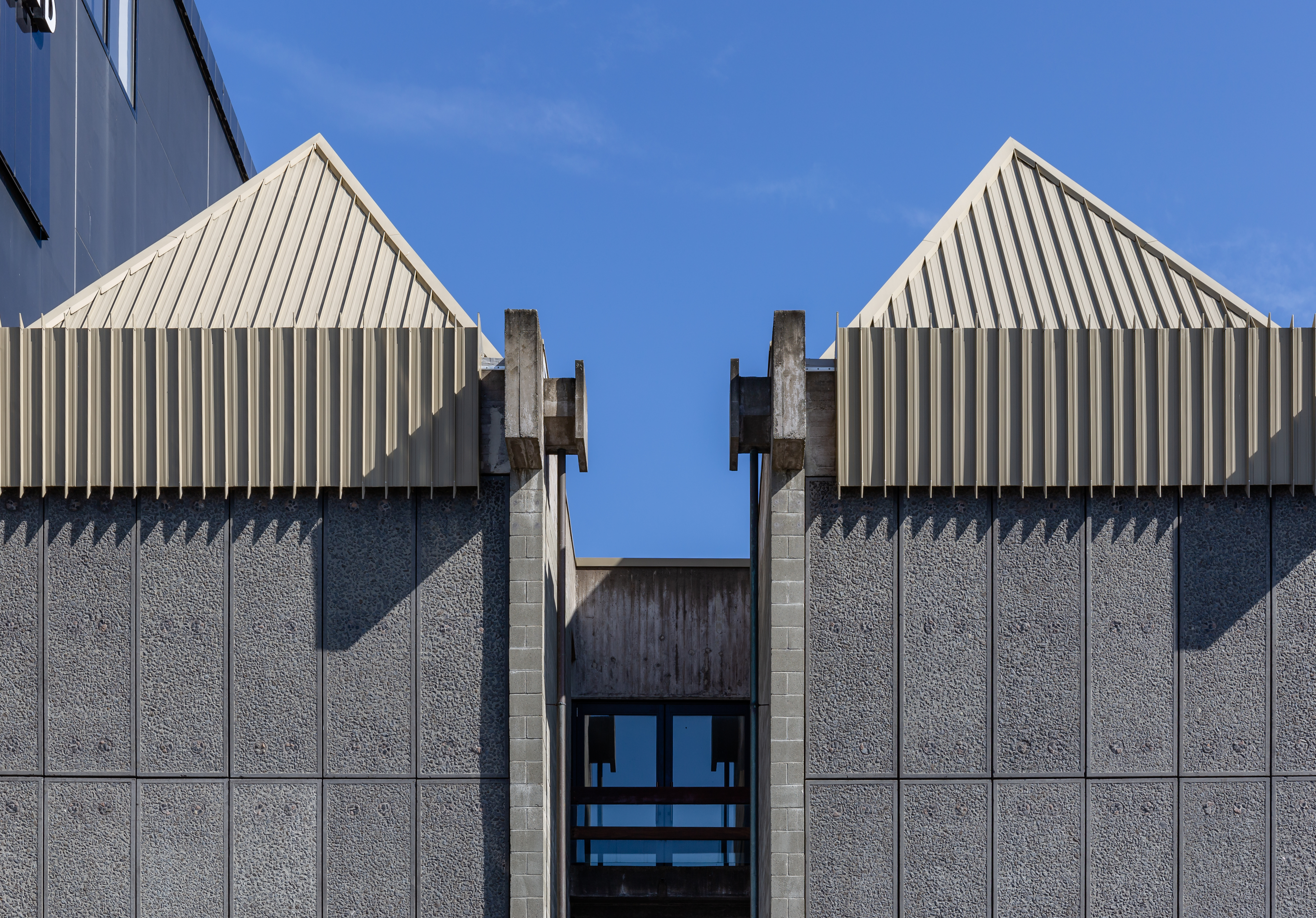
Centre of Contemporary Art (CoCA)

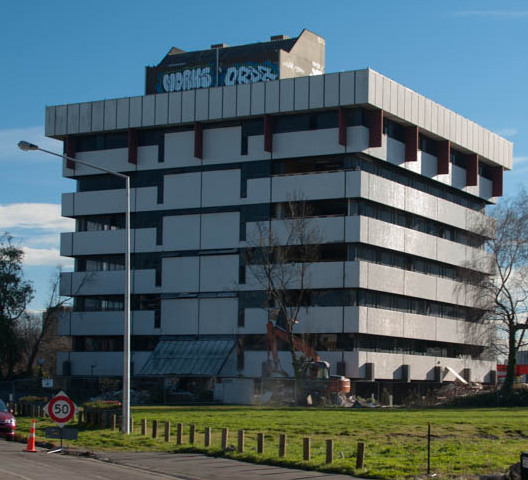
Arthur Young House

== Notable architects ==
- Miles Warren (1929–2022) – instrumental in developing the Christchurch School of architecture
- Maurice Mahoney (1929–2018) – architect who founded Warren and Mahoney with Warren
- Peter Beaven (1925–2012) – architect inspired by Victorian Gothic Revival
- Don Donnithorne (1926–2016) – architect who leaned into Scandinavian influence against Brutalism
- Charles Thomas (1928–2022) – notable architect during Christchurch School era
- Minson, Hansen & Dines – particularly noted for their CoCA building
- Trengrove & Marshall – noted for mid-century Christchurch School influence

== See also ==
- Warren and Mahoney
- Architecture of New Zealand
