= Mark Cleverley =

New Zealand designer (1933–2022)

- Born: 21 November 1933; Papakura, Auckland
- Died: 7 May 2022 (aged 88); New Zealand
- Occupation: Industrial designer
- Notable work: Crown Lynn

Mark Cleverley (21 November 1933 – 7 May 2022) was a New Zealand designer active from the 1960s to the 1990s. He was most notable for his work as Development Designer at Crown Lynn Potteries from 1968 until the early 1980s.

== Early life ==
Cleverly was born in 1933 in Papakura. In his childhood, Cheverly recalled that he had a love of functional drawing rather than typical fine art studies, preferring to work in line and geometric shapes.

== Career ==
Cleverley started his career at age 18 when living in Hamilton. During this time he worked as an architectural draughtsman at the New Zealand Co-operative Dairy. After this, he moved to Christchurch to work at Warren and Mahoney before winning a scholarship to the Ilam School of Fine Arts where he became one of the first students in the new graphic design programme.

Following his study, Cleverley freelanced in graphic design and, in 1969, he entered a design competition held by the New Zealand Post Office. Postage stamps were considered one of the most consistent means of advertising and projecting New Zealand identity aboard. As a result, it was important that the stamps both moulded and encapsulated public taste. Cleverley's stamps completed to a dramatic shift in the New Zealand design aesthetic as they were very different from what had been done before. These modernist and simplified designs which proved to be very popular.

Some of Cleverley's most distinctive postage stamps included the Ross Dependency series and 1970 New Zealand Exposition stamps.

=== Crown Lynn ===
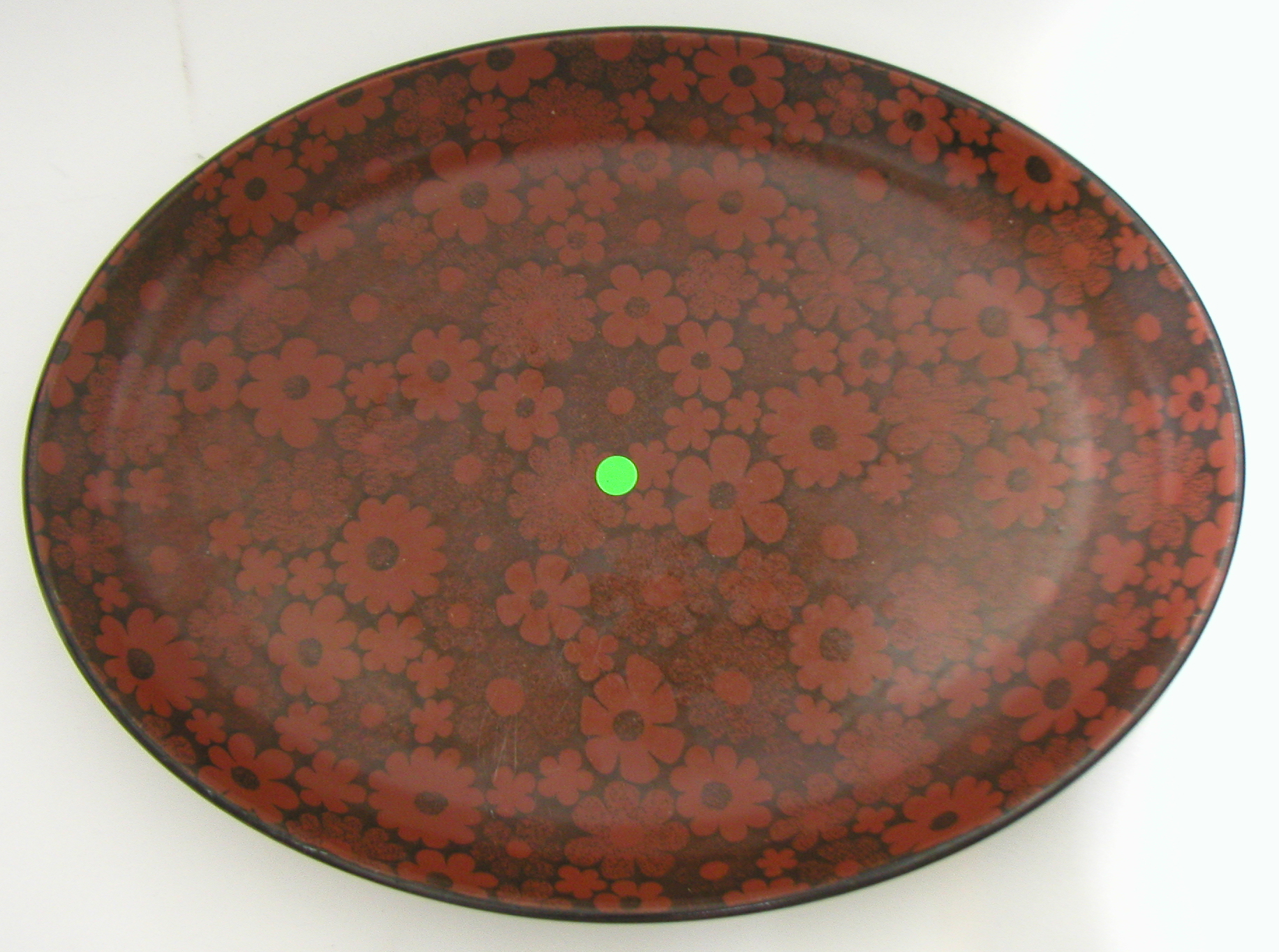
Crown Lynn Potteries, serving dish in Echo design. Collections of Auckland Museum.

In 1967, Cleverley was hired at Crown Lynn Potteries by Dave Jenkins. Crown Lynn already knew of Cleverley's work as he had won two design competitions and entered others. In his role as Development Designer, Cleverley worked to produce designs which merged overseas tastes with New Zealand styles.

During his time at Crown Lynn, Cleverley became well known for his introduction of new designs and printing techniques, taking reference from indigenous patterns and fighting conservative design ideas.

Some of his most well known work included the New Zealand parliamentary dining suite for the Bellamy's restaurant and the floral Echo design.

=== Teaching ===
After leaving Crown Lynn Potteries, Cleverley took up teaching roles in Christchurch and Wellington. He taught at the Wellington School of Design for more than a decade and the College Pro-Vice Chancellor Professor Claire Robinson recalled that he his work has "a deceptive simplicity, reflecting his belief that anything a designer does must make a contribution." His students noted his passion for typography and design history, in addition to his enthusiasm and engagement with their projects.

== Achievements and awards ==
In 1972, Cleverley became a full member of the prestigious Society of Industrial Artists and Designers (SIAD) in the United Kingdom. He was also nominated as the New Zealand representative in the 1974 International Council of Societies of Industrial Design (ICSID) Interdesign conference in Canada.

Cleverley was also awarded a Winston Churchill Fellowship for a research project on bilingual design in 1987. In 2013, he was elected to the Massey University College of Creative Arts Hall of Fame.

In 2014, Cleverley was received a Black Pin for Outstanding Achievement by The Designers Institute of New Zealand (DINZ), awarded to those who have made a lasting contribution to the design profession.
