= Dorset Street Flats =

Historic apartment building in Christchurch

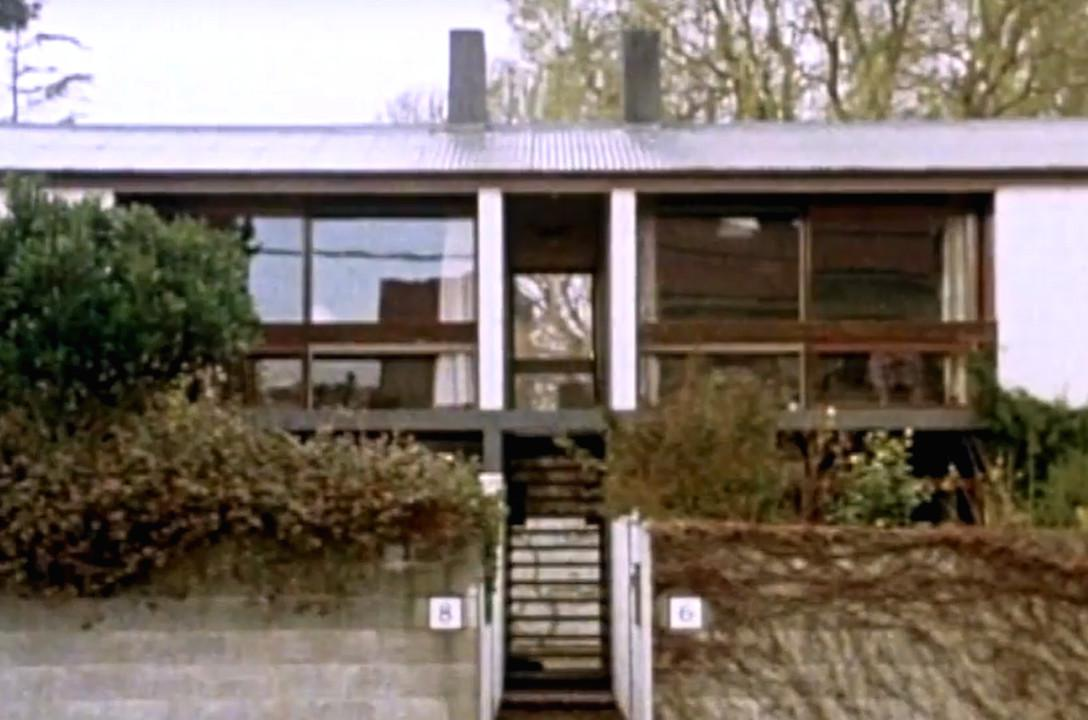
- Dorset Street Flats in the 1970s

General information
- Type: Residential
- Architectural style: Modernist, Christchurch School
- Location: Christchurch Central, New Zealand
- Year(s) built: 1956–1957

Design and construction
- Architect(s): Miles Warren
- Engineer: Lyall Holmes
- Main contractor: Cecil Davenport

Renovating team
- Architect(s): Greg Young of Young Architects
- Awards and prizes: 2023 New Zealand Architecture Awards

Heritage New Zealand – Category 1
- Reference no.: 7804

The Dorset Street Flats is a mid-century modernist apartment complex in Christchurch, New Zealand. It was designed by Miles Warren and built in the late 1950s. It is credited as an essential example of Christchurch Style architecture and is regarded among the most significant twentieth-century architectural projects in New Zealand. In 2010, Heritage New Zealand listed it as a Category 1 historic place.

The building was originally derided by the public for its unconventional approach, particularly its brutalist aspects. However, it was praised by contemporary architects and retrospectively appreciated, regarded as an important project in establishing the Christchurch School of architecture, a modernist design language developed in Christchurch.

The Dorset Street Flats complex underwent a significant restoration following the 2011 Christchurch earthquake, but retains much of its essential character. The apartments are privately owned and the building continues to operate as a residential apartment complex.

== Construction and design ==
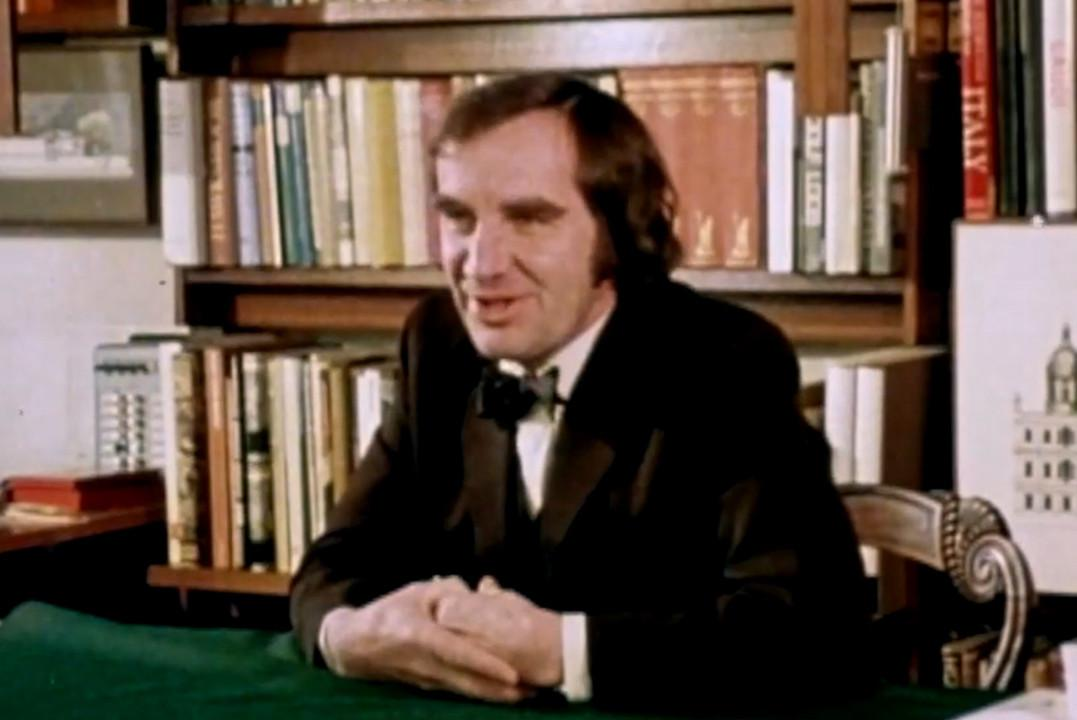
Architect Sir Miles Warren in his office in the 1970s

The Dorset Street Flats were designed in 1956 by Sir Miles Warren. It was among his earliest projects after beginning his design practice the year earlier, and predated his partnership with Maurice Mahoney in 1958. Warren designed the buildings for himself and three friends: Michael Weston, Simon Wood and Michael Davis.

The complex was originally built on 771 square metres and comprised eight one-bedroom apartments which featured built-in furniture and fittings, with the conversion of a preexisting stable block allowing for a ninth apartment. The design also had four garages and courtyards, and a communal laundry area.

Warren was inspired by aspects of modernism and New Brutalism, the latter which he had been exposed to during his time in Britain in the 1950s. The project was a stark departure from other residential buildings at the time, many which were inspired by Edwardian and Victorian styles. He earned praise from critics and fellow architects, but public reception was more critical; the buildings were compared to a prison complex and reportedly jeered at by detouring busses, colloquially nicknamed "Fort Dorset". For a time, the complex was panned as "Christchurch's ugliest building". In his autobiography, Warren said: "as a young architect I was proud to achieve such notoriety".

The buildings were constructed by Cecil Davenport, his brother Snow, and an apprentice. The original construction posed engineering challenges, including water leaking into the porous concrete blocks. Warren and Weston both worked on the building manually completing the finishing, painting, and garden landscaping.

== Heritage restoration ==
In 2010, the complex was granted heritage status for its significance in influencing New Zealand architecture, marked as a Category 1 historical place. The following year, it was badly damaged in the 2011 Christchurch earthquake and was expected to be demolished. However, the owners worked together and saved the apartments in a complicated process that took over a decade to plan, fund and execute.

The restoration project was designed by Greg Young of Young Architects and won the 2023 New Zealand Architecture Awards.

== Legacy ==
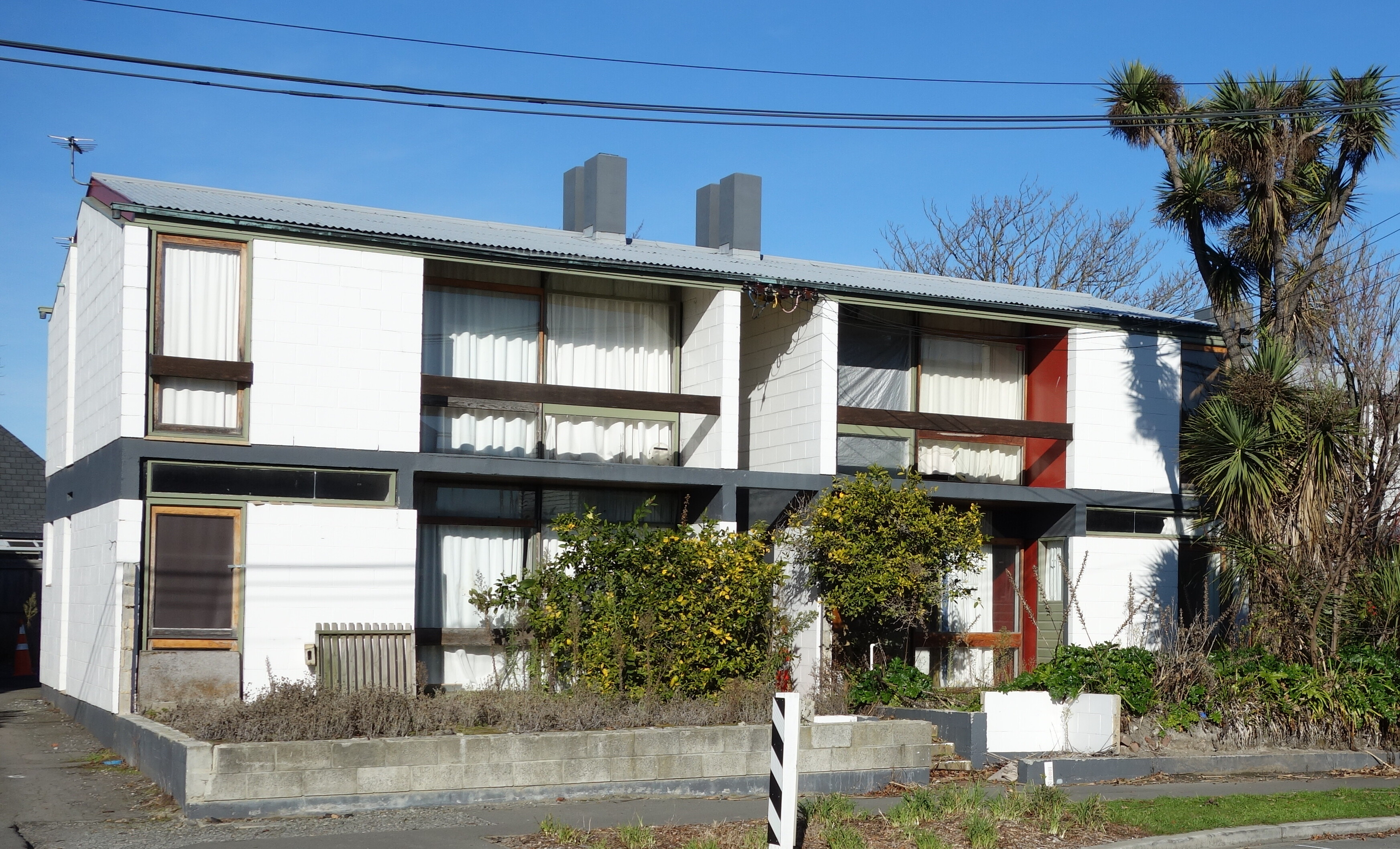
Dorset Street Flats in 2016, prior to restoration

Dorset Street Flats is regarded as one of the most significant buildings in the second half of the 20th century in New Zealand architecture, influencing new standards in the design, construction, and social aspects of residential buildings. It is credited as an early design in the Christchurch School movement, and one of the first attempts in New Zealand to construct a building with load-bearing concrete block.

As of the 2020s, the Dorset Street Flats remain in use as private residential apartments, and have been offered on the open market.
