= Centra Building =

Former hotel and commercial building in Christchurch, New Zealand

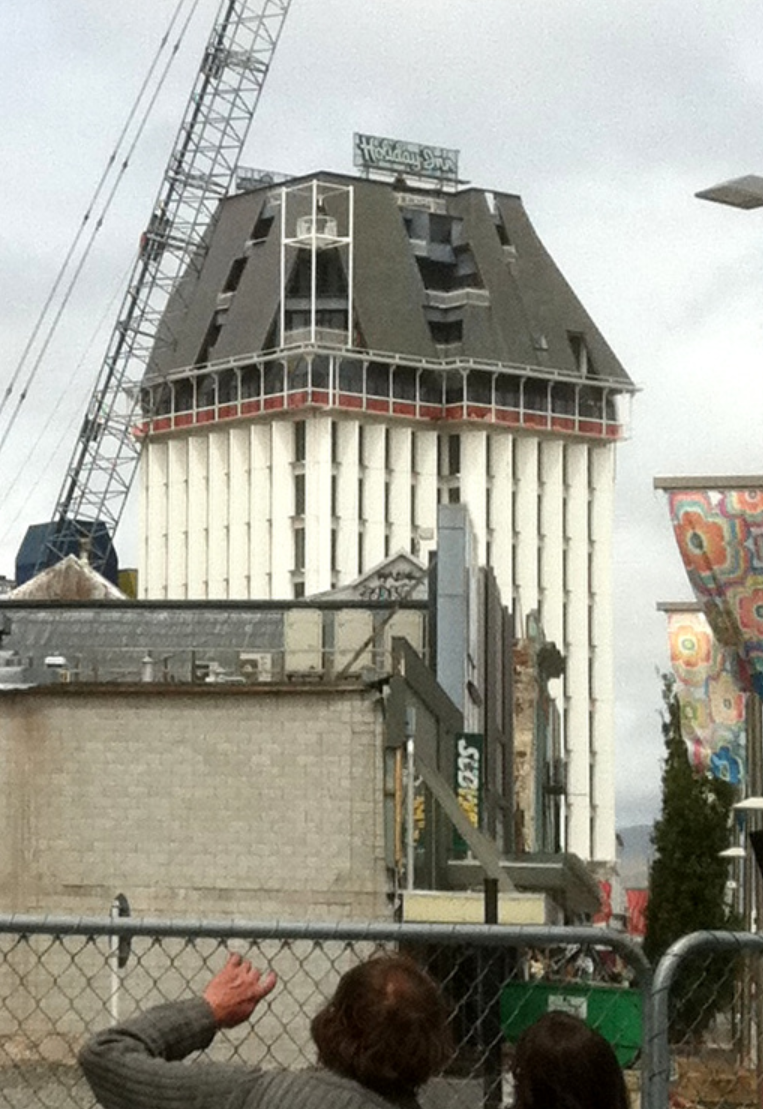
- Centra Building from outside the Red Zone cordon (December 2011)
- Interactive map of the Centra Building area
- Alternative names: Centra Hotel, United Bank Building, Holiday Inn Christchurch City Centre

General information
- Type: Commercial
- Architectural style: Postmodernism, Christchurch Style
- Location: Christchurch Central, New Zealand
- Year built: 1986 – 1989
- Completed: 1989
- Renovated: 2009
- Demolished: 2012
- Renovation cost: NZ$2.5M
- Owner: Philip Carter

Height
- Height: 60 metres

Design and construction
- Architect: Peter Beaven

Renovating team
- Architect: Dalman Architecture Limited

The Centra Building (also known as the Centra Hotel, United Bank Building and Holiday Inn Christchurch City Centre) was a former office tower and hotel in central Christchurch, New Zealand. It was designed by architect Peter Beaven in the post-modernist Christchurch style, and was the eighth tallest tower in the central city prior to its demolition.

Built in the late 1980s, the Centra Building was originally built as an office tower for the headquarters of the United Building Society, which later became United Bank. In the mid-1990s, it was acquired by Philip Carter and remodeled as a hotel. In 2004, it rebranded as Holiday Inn Christchurch City Centre, and became colloquially known as the Holiday Inn building.

The Centra building was damaged in the 2011 Christchurch earthquake, and was demolished in October 2012. The site sat vacant under Carter's ownership until the 2020s, when resource consent was granted in 2022 to build a new retail space on the site.

== Construction and design ==
The Centra Building was designed by architect Peter Beaven in his late career. He is thought to have drawn inspiration from the Manchester Unity Building in Christchurch (later known as SBS House) and the Canterbury Provincial Council Buildings.

Construction on the Centra Building began in 1986, with the laying of the foundations in June that year. In 1988, the external cladding was added as the building took shape. The property was completed in 1989.

The Centra building featured a car park basement with a transformer helping supply power to nearby properties. There were 16 concrete Dycore floors, a mezzanine area, and the penthouse roof was made from copper, covering two levels supported by a steel structure. In the early configuration of the building, there was a colonnaded banking chamber and multiple levels of uniform office space. The basement had a substation in it.

== History ==
The Centra Building was originally developed as an office tower, and was home to the United Building Society which later became United Bank.

Around 1995, Philip Carter of Carter Group purchased the property and began work to redevelop it into a hotel, undertaking a project estimated to have cost up to NZ$17M. It was originally called the Centra Hotel before being rebranded in 2004 as Holiday Inn Christchurch City Centre. This is not to be confused with the Holiday Inn Avon, another Christchurch hotel which was owned by Carter.

In 2009, the hotel was significantly refurbished, including the lobby, bar, and 120 guest rooms, helping it receive a Qualmark 4 Star Plus rating. The project was undertaken by Dalman Architecture Limited and cost NZ$2.5M, according to Carter.

The Centra Building was severely damaged in the 2011 Christchurch earthquake. It was permanently closed and cordoned off in the Christchurch red zone area.

== Demolition ==
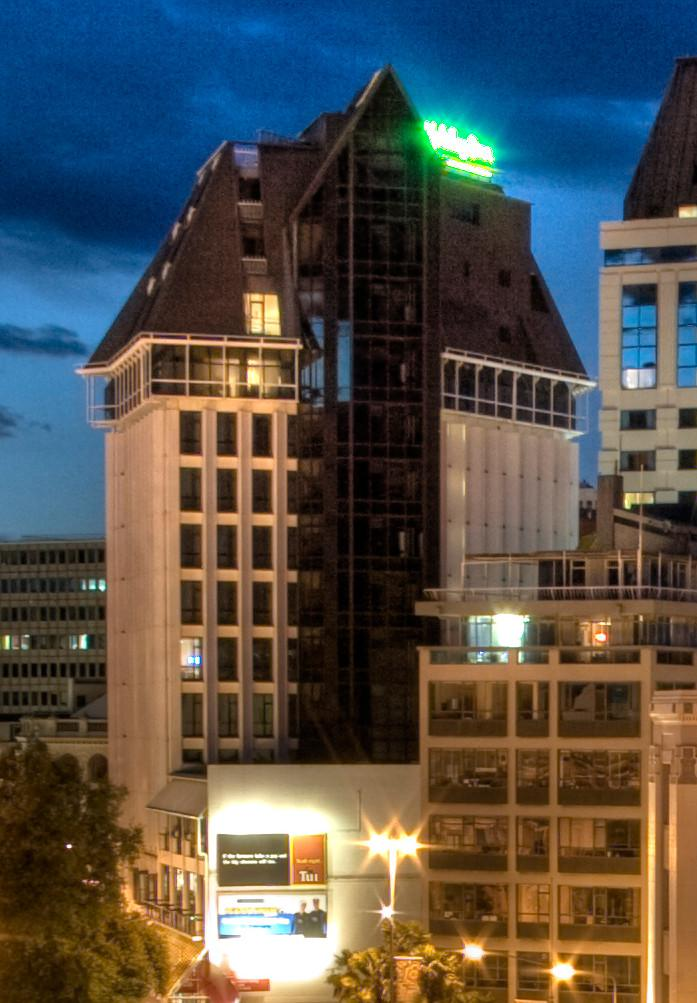
Centra Building at night in February 2009

In February 2012, Carter announced the project to demolish the tower was out for tender, but wouldn't elaborate on the condition of the building at the time.

Demolition began in October undertaken by Nikau Group. It was later claimed that the structure was considered high risk of collapse, resulting in a more complicated demolition process. The famous Twinkle Toes excavator was brought in to help rapidly deconstruct the building. Beaven later described the destruction of the buildings he designed, including the Centra Building, as a "huge, shattering loss."

The site remained unused for over a decade, with the basement level partially exposed to the elements. A plan to rebuild Ao Tawhiti school on the site fell through in 2016; the school had previously announced it would build and occupy a property on the land by 2017. Carter declined to comment on his plans, but claimed in 2015 he had "endeavoured to enable the return" of the inner-city school.

In 2017, the Christchurch city council included the former Centra Building site on their "dirty 30" list of properties considered dangerous or eyesores, regarding it as a hindrance to the rebuild effort.

In 2022, Carter Group received resource consent to build on the site. The new property will likely be used for retail and office space, and has no connection to the former property other than its location.
