= Lyttelton Road Tunnel Administration Building =

Operational Building

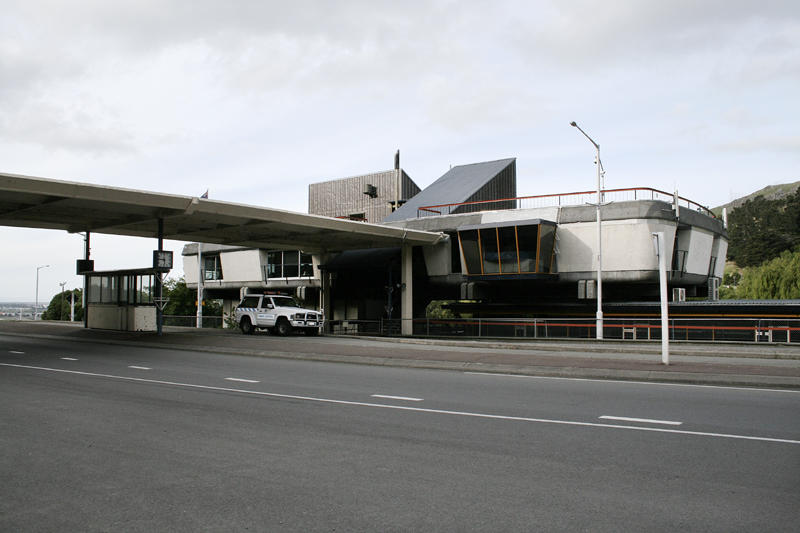
- Interactive map of the Lyttelton Road Tunnel Administration Building area

General information
- Location: Heathcote Valley, Christchurch, New Zealand
- Coordinates: 43.5849°S 172.7064°E
- Completed: 1963-64
- Demolished: 2013
- Owner: NZ Transport Agency

Design and construction
- Architect: Peter Beaven
- Awards and prizes: NZIA Gold Medal (1966); NZIA 25-year award (1999)

Heritage New Zealand – Category 1
- Designated: 14 May 2008
- Reference no.: 7746

The Lyttelton Road Tunnel Administration Building was built in the mid-1960s as an operational building for the Lyttelton road tunnel in Christchurch, New Zealand. The building was designed by architect Peter Beaven and is seen as significant in the development of New Zealand architecture.

When the building was commissioned, the Christchurch Lyttelton Road Tunnel Authority wanted an impressive structure that would reflect the importance of the newly built tunnel connection into Christchurch. The site of the building was additionally significant in being at the Christchurch end of the Bridle Path, where Canterbury's first settlers travelled along.

The building and the adjoining canopy were badly damaged during the 2011 Christchurch earthquake, and as a result the canopy was demolished and the building closed. The building itself was demolished in 2013.
