= Peter Beaven =

New Zealand architect (1925–2012)

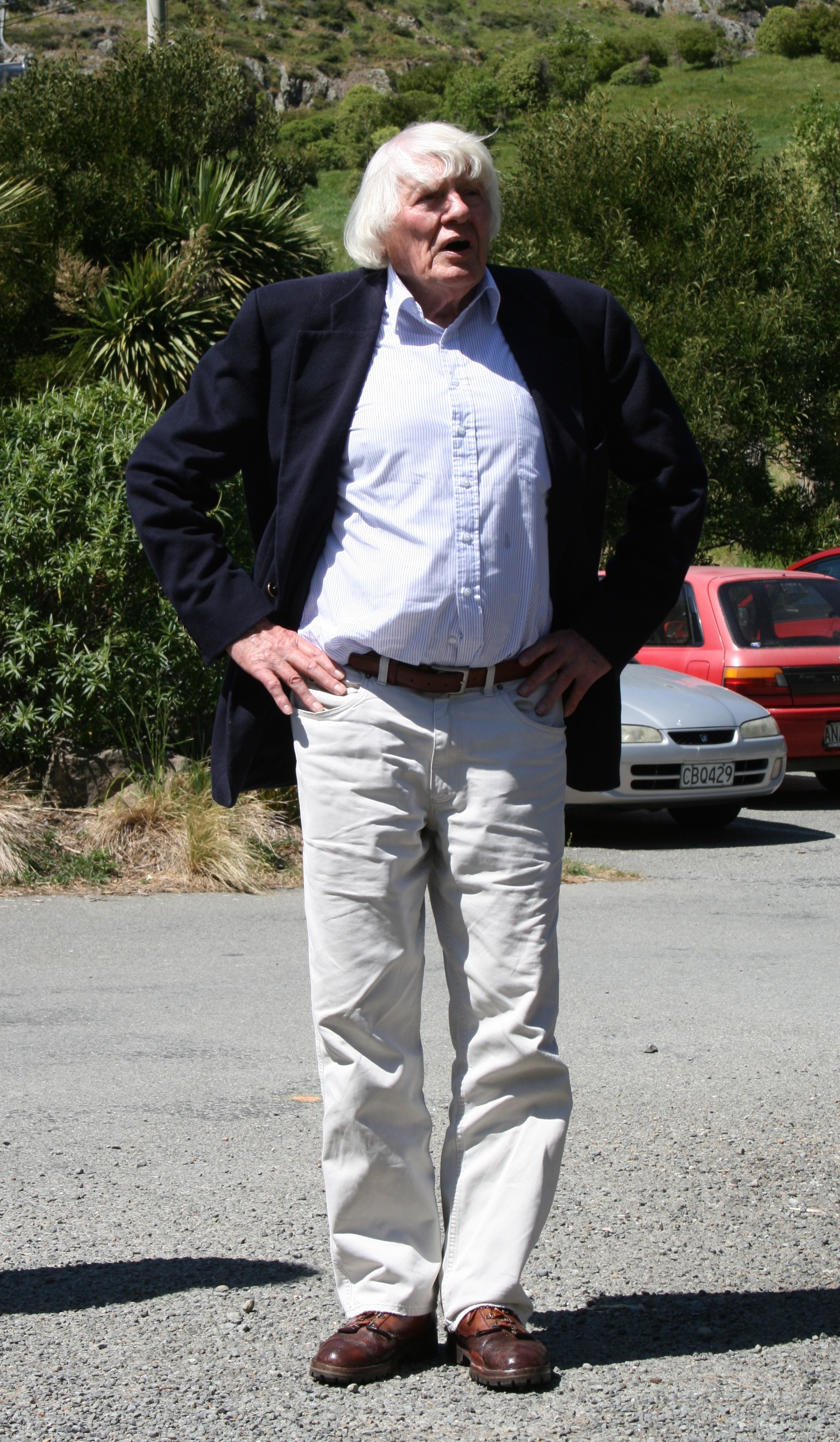
- Peter Beaven in 2008
- Born: Peter Jamieson Beaven; 13 August 1925; Christchurch
- Died: 4 June 2012 (aged 86); Blenheim
- Education: University of Auckland
- Occupation: Architect
- Awards: NZIA Gold Medal 2003
- Buildings: Lyttelton Road Tunnel Administration Building; Chateau on the Park

Peter Jamieson Beaven (13 August 1925 – 4 June 2012) was a New Zealand architect based in Christchurch, who lived for his last few months in Blenheim. He was a co-founder of New Zealand's first heritage lobby group, the Civic Trust, and is regarded as a significant figure in Christchurch Style architecture.

== Early life ==
Beaven was born in Christchurch, the son of Eric Tamate Beaven and Joan Maria Scott Jamieson. His mother was the daughter of William Graham Jamieson and May Jamieson (née Whitehouse). William Jamieson and his brother James Jamieson were renowned builders for the early Christchurch area, who constructed buildings like the Cathedral of the Blessed Sacrament, Otahuna, Strowan House and the original office of The Press in Cashel Street. The construction business was established in 1864 by his great-grandfather, Samuel Jamieson, who arrived from Scotland at Lyttelton on board the Captain Cook on 5 September 1863.

Beaven was educated at Christ's College and the School of Architecture of the University of Auckland. A conversation with the architect Paul Pascoe during his secondary school time led to the choice of his professional career. His tertiary education was interrupted by war service with the Royal New Zealand Navy.

== Professional career ==
Beaven was based in Timaru for four years after his graduation, mainly designing woolstores all over New Zealand. He then moved to Christchurch, where he established his practice in the mid-1950s. Early in his career, he explored the world and lived in Japan for six months in the early 1950s, and undertook major tours to Europe and Asia in the early 1960s, all of which influenced his architectural style.

His outlook soon became focussed on his local Christchurch, and he was inspired by Victorian Gothic Revival and worked a lot with symbolism. The Lyttelton Road Tunnel Administration Building uses the latter approach, with the brief asking for a grand entrance to the Canterbury Plains. With reference to the First Four Ships, Beaven designed the building as the fifth ship moored next to the motorway at the tunnel entrance. The building, in the form of the tub of a ship, is based on exposed pile foundations, with low planting representing the sea around the ship. The Modern Movement architecture employed here has form following function and was registered by the New Zealand Historic Places Trust as a Category I heritage building on 14 May 2008. It was honoured as an example of Beaven's contribution to New Zealand architecture. The toll booths were removed in 1979 when the tunnel toll was removed, and the canopy once over the toll booths was demolished after receiving damage from rock fall caused by the February 2011 Christchurch earthquake.

The former approach inspired the Manchester Unity Building and later known as the SBS Building, built in 1967 on the corner of Manchester and Worcester Streets. The design won an award from the New Zealand Institute of Architects (NZIA) in 1969, and was honoured again with a 25-year design award by NZIA in 1999. According to Beaven, the judges described it as "the most significant post-war office building". The nine-storey building was demolished in September 2011 following damage received during the February 2011 earthquake. Bevan also designed the Centra Building, a high rise on the corner of Cashel and High Streets in Christchurch, for the United Building Society (later called United Bank). It was converted into a hotel in the mid-1990s called the Centra Hotel, later rebranded as the Holiday Inn. It was demolished later in 2012 by the long reach excavator Twinkle Toes. The 2011 earthquake had a devastating effect on Beavan's legacy, leaving two of his best-preserved buildings in North London, UK: a housing development in Wedderburn Road in Belsize Park (1982) and the Tile Kiln Studios in Highgate (1982).

When Beaven turned 80 in 2005, he was New Zealand's oldest practising architect. At the time of his death, his last commission, a house in Ashburton, was nearing completion.

== Awards and recognition ==
Sir Miles Warren and Beaven are the only two Christchurch architects who have been awarded the New Zealand Institute of Architects gold medal. Beaven received his gold medal in 2003. Beaven is credited with having made a significant contribution to retaining the Christchurch Arts Centre after the University of Canterbury moved to its new campus in Ilam. In the 2012 Canterbury Heritage Awards held on 13 September, Beaven was posthumously awarded the Heritage Champion Award.

== Notable works ==
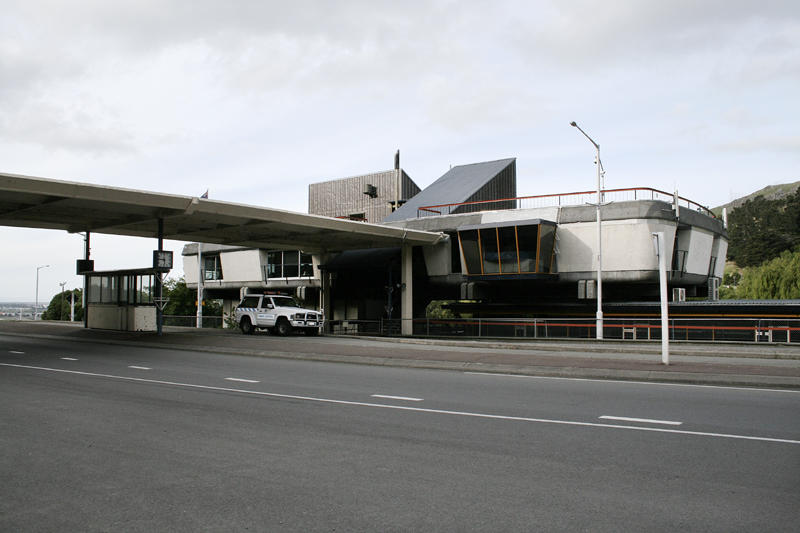
Lyttelton Road Tunnel Administration Building in 2008

- Lyttelton Road Tunnel Administration Building (1962–1964), tunnel control building that is Category I registered by the New Zealand Historic Places Trust (NZHPT); demolished in 2013
- Canterbury Terminating Building Society, Christchurch (1961)
- SBS Building (1967), a Christchurch office building demolished in 2011
- Canterbury Arcade (1967–1968), a shopping arcade and office building that connects High and Queen Streets, Auckland
- Swimming hall at Queen Elizabeth II Park (1971–1973)
- Chateau on the Park (1972–1973), a hotel built as a Gothic Revival fantasy

== Private life ==
Beaven was married to Mary Beaven (daughter of Geoffrey Beaglehole, and thus niece of John and Ernest Beaglehole), and they had three children together (Sabrina Sullivan, Sophie Jolliffe and Tom Beaven). His second marriage was to Jocelyn Allison (née Beadel) from 1984 until their divorce in 1994. Lesley Beaven was his third wife. He died in Blenheim on 4 June 2012, where he had lived for his last few months. He could not live in Christchurch any longer, as life there since the 2011 Christchurch earthquake was too difficult for him:

Christchurch is pretty much hell for me now, as someone who's spent 60 years in architecture and history. That's all gone now. I've lost all my background really. Blenheim is healing...

Beaven's funeral service was held at the Christ's College Chapel. He is survived by his third wife, his three children and eight grandchildren.

He had co-founded the Christchurch Civic Trust, New Zealand's first lobby group for heritage buildings. To many, Beaven was less known as an architect, but more for his outspokenness. He was a lobbyist for good design and when he disagreed with a proposal, there was no ambiguity. He called the Chalice in Cathedral Square a "vent to an underground toilet", and the Christchurch Art Gallery was for him "that great alien". Peter and Lesley Beaven were prominent opponents of the alterations to Canterbury Museum, designed by Ian Athfield and approved by Christchurch City Council, but rejected by the Environment Court in 2006.
