= College House (University of Canterbury) =

New Zealand hall of residence

- University of Canterbury
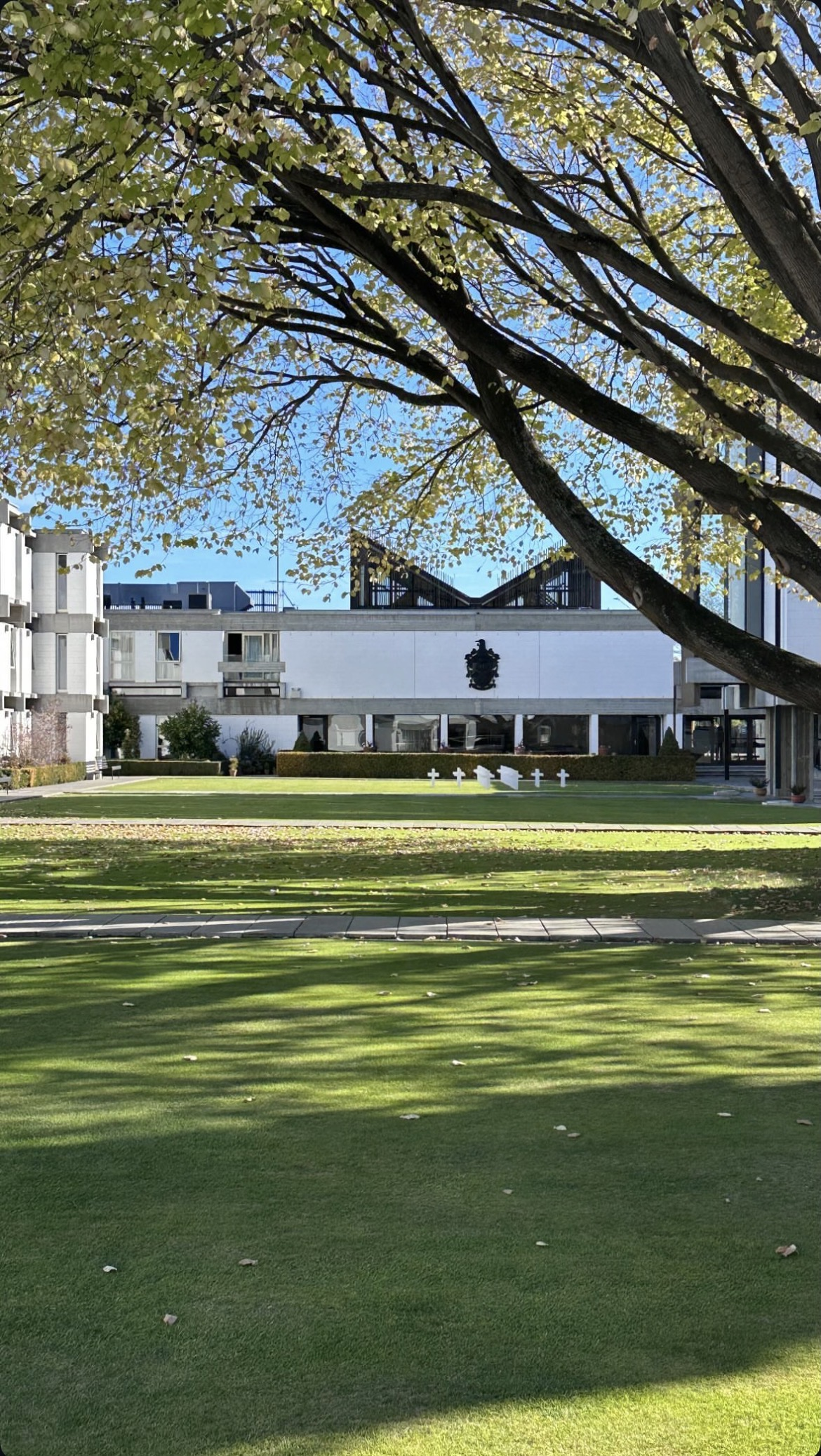
- Inner courtyard of College House

- College House Coat of Arms
- Location: 100 Waimairi Road, Christchurch, New Zealand
- Coordinates: 43°31′25.0″S 172°34′24.9″E
- Motto: Pro Ecclesia Dei (Latin)
- Motto in English: For the Church of God
- Established: 1850; 176 years ago 1873; 153 years ago (Canterbury College)
- Architect: Warren and Mahoney
- Architectural style: Modernist
- Status: Affiliated
- Sister college: Selwyn College, Otago
- Warden: Peter Carrell
- Principal: Richard Taylor
- Undergraduates: 159
- Postgraduates: <10
- Religious affiliation(s): Anglicanism
- Website: collegehouse.org.nz

College House is a hall of residence at the University of Canterbury in Christchurch, New Zealand. Founded originally in 1850 as a collegiate for young men alongside Christ's College, it became a residential college for the then Canterbury College of the new University of New Zealand in 1873. It broke away from Christ's College in 1957 and relocated to the suburb of Ilam. In 1985, the college permitted the admission of women alongside men.

The current college was designed by Warren and Mahoney. The architect's brief was simply to design a college for 120 men. Structural engineering was carried out by Lyall Holmes of Holmes Consulting.

Built 1964–1967, restorations and renovations were performed by Wilkie and Bruce in 2022.
