= Miles Warren =

New Zealand architect (1929–2022)

Sir Miles Warren ONZ KBE FNZIA
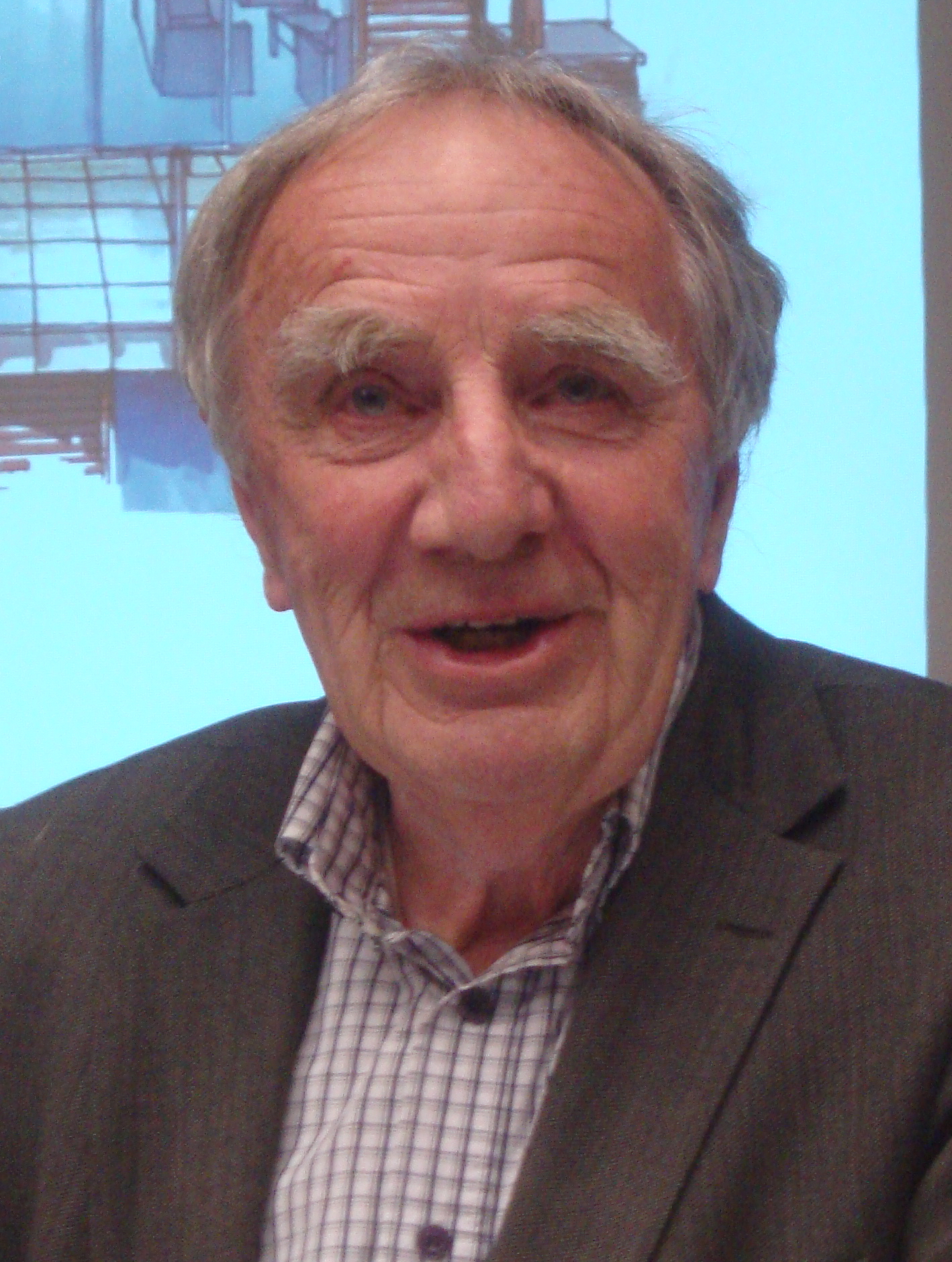
- Warren in 2011
- Born: 10 May 1929; Christchurch, New Zealand
- Died: 9 August 2022 (aged 93); Christchurch, New Zealand
- Education: Auckland University College
- Occupation: Architect
- Awards: NZIA Gold Medal (1959, 1964, 1969, 1973, 2000)
- Practice: Warren and Mahoney
- Buildings: Christchurch Town Hall; Dorset Street Flats; Harewood Crematorium; College House

Sir Frederick Miles Warren ONZ KBE FNZIA (10 May 1929 – 9 August 2022) was a New Zealand architect. He apprenticed under Cecil Wood before studying architecture at the University of Auckland, eventually working at the London County Council where he was exposed to British New Brutalism. Upon returning to Christchurch, and forming the practice Warren and Mahoney, he was instrumental in developing the "Christchurch School" of architecture, an intersection between the truth-to-materials and structural expression that characterised Brutalism, and the low-key, Scandinavian and Japanese commitment to "straightforwardness". He retired from Warren and Mahoney in 1994 but continued to consult as an architect and maintain his historic home and garden at Ohinetahi.

== Early life ==
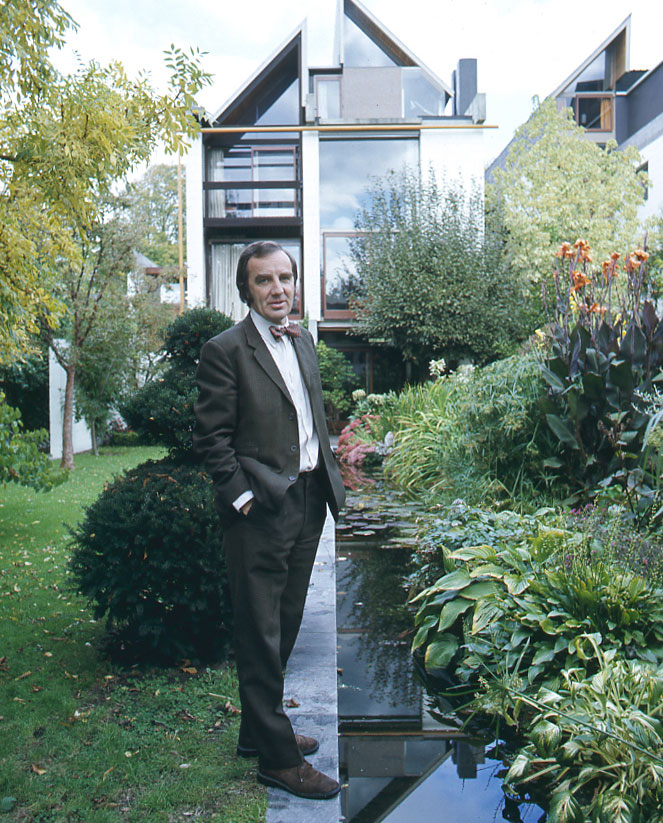
Miles Warren, his office and flat

Warren was born in Christchurch on 10 May 1929, the son of Jean and Maurice Warren. He was educated at Christ's College. He commenced his architectural training as an apprentice to Cecil Wood and studied architecture via correspondence at the Christchurch Atelier. Warren later moved to Auckland to complete his studies at the University of Auckland.

== Buildings ==
Warren's first major building was the Dorset Street Flats (designed in 1956) that were derided as prison-like due to their small scale and exposed concrete. This domestic vocabulary was quickly adapted to various building types – the Dental Nurses School (1958), the architect's own office and home (1962), Harewood Crematorium (1963), Christchurch College (now known as College House) (1964) and the Christchurch Town Hall (1972).

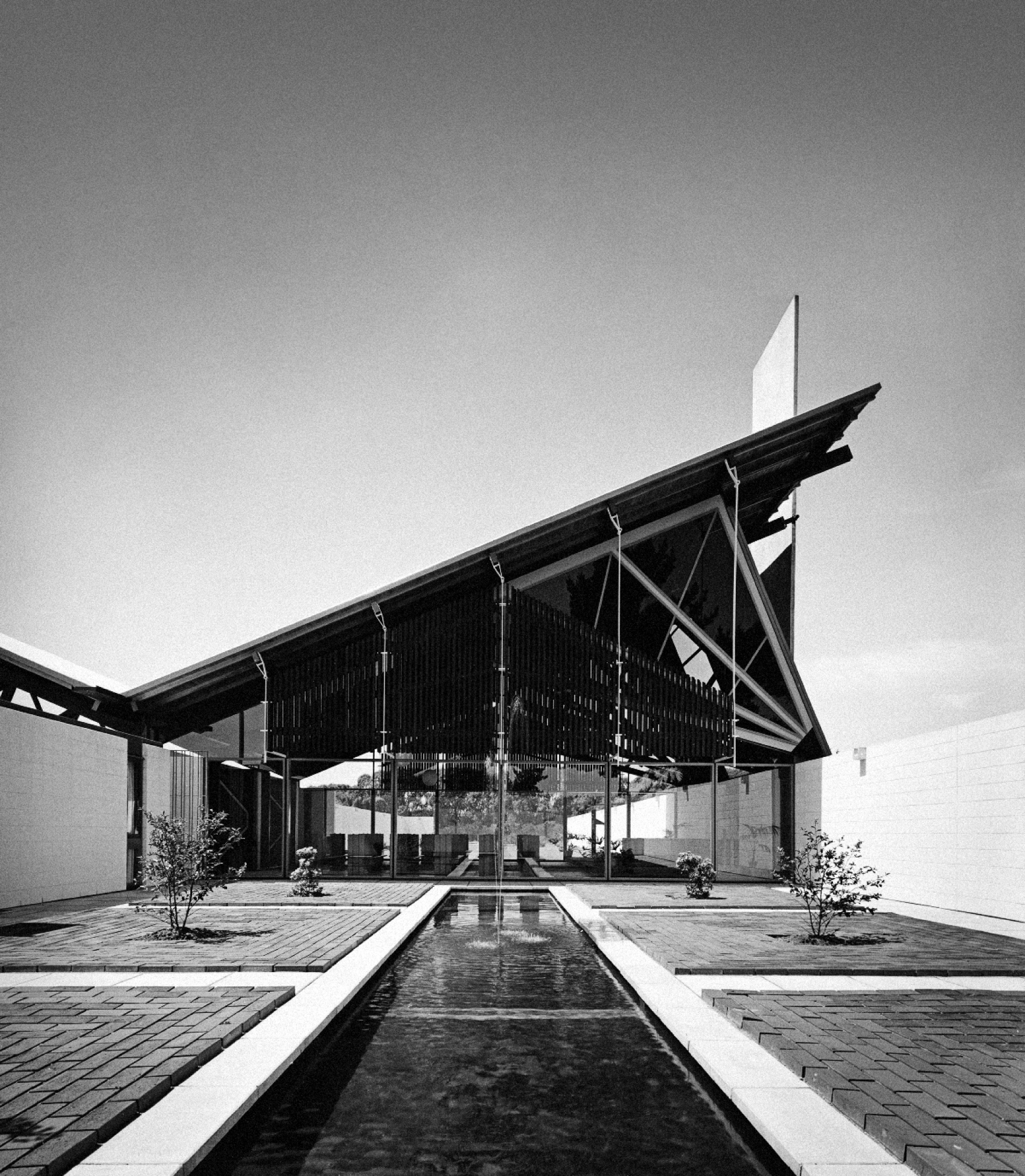
Warren & Mahoney: Harewood Crematorium (1963)

== Awards and recognition ==
Warren & Mahoney won the New Zealand Institute of Architects (NZIA) Gold Medal in 1959, 1964, 1969 and 1973. In 1966 they won the American Institute of Architects' Pan Pacific Citation, an award also given to among others the architects Kenzo Tange and Harry Seidler. Warren was awarded the NZIA Gold Medal as an individual in 2000. Warren and Peter Beaven are the only two Christchurch architects who have been awarded both the New Zealand Institute of Architects gold medal.

In the 1974 New Year Honours, Warren was appointed a Commander of the Order of the British Empire, advanced to Knight Commander of the Order of the British Empire in the 1985 New Year Honours, and appointed to the Order of New Zealand in the 1995 Queen's Birthday Honours. In 2001 he received an Honorary Doctorate from the University of Auckland, and in 2003 he received an Icon Award from the Arts Foundation of New Zealand. In March 2009, Warren was commemorated as one of the Twelve Local Heroes, and a bronze bust of him was unveiled outside the Christchurch Arts Centre.

For his 80th birthday, his work was the basis of an exhibition at the Christchurch Art Gallery, which was also shown at the University of Auckland's Gus Fisher Gallery in 2010.

In 2011 Warren was profiled on Artsville, a TVNZ arts documentary series.

Critics of his work and its impact on the Victorian architectural heritage of Christchurch include Duncan Fallowell, who has written: "his buildings can't manage the simplest attributes of good design or benevolence".

In 2015, the NZIA replaced their Architecture Medal award with four named awards honouring prominent New Zealand architects, including the Sir Miles Warren Award for Commercial Architecture.

== Gardens ==
In addition to his passion for architecture Warren was also well known as a keen and talented gardener. The garden at 65 Cambridge Terrace (pictured above) was admired for its simplicity. In 1977, with Pauline and John Trengrove, Warren began work on the garden at Ohinetahi. This garden includes a formal rose garden, a walled "red and green" garden and a woodland garden. Warren also designed a display garden for the 2009 Ellerslie Flower Show. In 2012 Warren gifted his house and garden to the people of New Zealand via the Ohinetahi Charitable Trust.

== Death ==
Warren died in Christchurch on 9 August 2022 at the age of 93.

== Books ==
Miles Warren: An Autobiography was published by Canterbury University Press in November 2008.

== List of designs ==
- Dorset Street Flats (1956–1957)
- GN Grigg House (1957)
- Dental Nurses Training School (1958–1959)
- RH Ballantyne House (1959)
- JJ Connor Flats (1960)
- Carlton Mill Rd Flats (1960)
- MB Warren House (1961)
- BA Broderick Townhouses (1962)
- Architect's Office & Flat (1962–1979)
- Memorial Gardens & Crematorium (1962–1963)
- Christchurch Wool Exchange (1962–1964)
- College House at the University of Canterbury (1964–1970)
- RC Webb Flats (1965)
- Munro House (1968)
- HR Irving House (1968)
- JH Elworthy House (1969)
- Christchurch Town Hall (1966–1972)
- NZ Chancery, Washington, DC (1975–1981)
- D Forbes House (1976)
- Christchurch Central Library, Christchurch (1982)
- Michael Fowler Centre, Wellington (1983)
- Rotorua Civic Offices (1985–1986)
- Clarendon Tower (1986–1987)
- Compudigm House, Wellington (1989)
- TVNZ Centre, Auckland (1990)
