= Maurice Mahoney =

New Zealand architect (1929–2018)

Maurice Mahoney ONZM DFNZIA
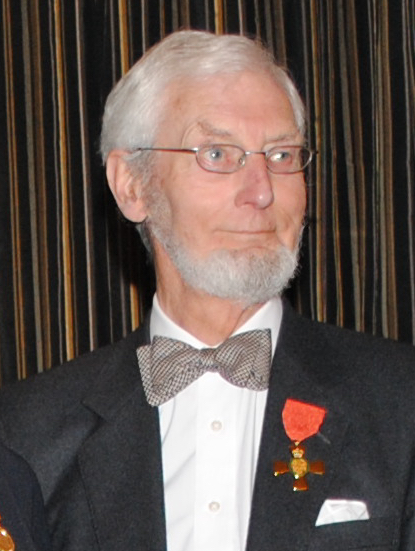
- Mahoney in 2010
- Born: 1929; Plaistow, London, England
- Died: 31 October 2018 (aged 89); Christchurch, New Zealand
- Occupation: Architect
- Practice: Warren and Mahoney
- Buildings: Christchurch Town Hall; College House

Maurice Edward Mahoney (1929 – 31 October 2018) was a New Zealand architect.

== Early life ==
Mahoney was born in 1929 in Plaistow in the south-east of London to working class parents, Doris and Ernest Mahoney. The family came to New Zealand when Mahoney was 10 via one of the last passenger ships that would leave Europe after the outbreak of World War II. They settled in the Christchurch suburb of Sydenham. In his early 20s, his family moved to Opawa.

== Professional career ==
The Mahoney family could not afford to send their son to university, and it took him 12 years to achieve an architectural degree alongside full-time work in architectural practices.

Mahoney first met Miles Warren (1929–2022) when they were 16. In 1958, they formed the architectural practice of Warren and Mahoney. The two architects were like "chalk and cheese" according to Mahoney's daughter, and this is why the company was so successful. Warren had the ideas, was the orator, and sought publicity, while Mahoney worked out the details in the backroom and made things work. Warren himself stated that they worked well together "because each of us supplied what the other lacked". The Christchurch architectural historian Jessica Halliday described Mahoney as a "giant of New Zealand architecture".

== Awards ==
In the 2010 Birthday Honours, Mahoney was appointed an Officer of the New Zealand Order of Merit for services to architecture. In 2017, he was made the inaugural distinguished fellow of the New Zealand Institute of Architects.

== Personal life ==
After moving to Opawa in the 1950s, he married his neighbour Margaret in 1960. They were to have three daughters and one son. Mahoney died on 31 October 2018 at Nurse Maude Hospice in Christchurch. He was survived by his wife and their children. His service was held at St Barnabas Church.
