= Warren and Mahoney =

New Zealand architectural firm

- Type: Private company
- Industry: Architecture
- Founded: 1955; 71 years ago in Christchurch, New Zealand
- Founder: Sir Miles Warren; Maurice Mahoney
- Headquarters: Auckland, New Zealand
- Number of locations: 7 studios (2026)
- Area served: Australia; New Zealand
- Number of employees: 350+
- Website: www.warrenandmahoney.com

Warren and Mahoney is an international architecture and design practice. It has offices in New Zealand and Australia. It was recognised in 2023 as 'one of the world's most innovative architecture practices' for "creating a comprehensive indigenous design focus relevant to its work in New Zealand and beyond".

== History ==
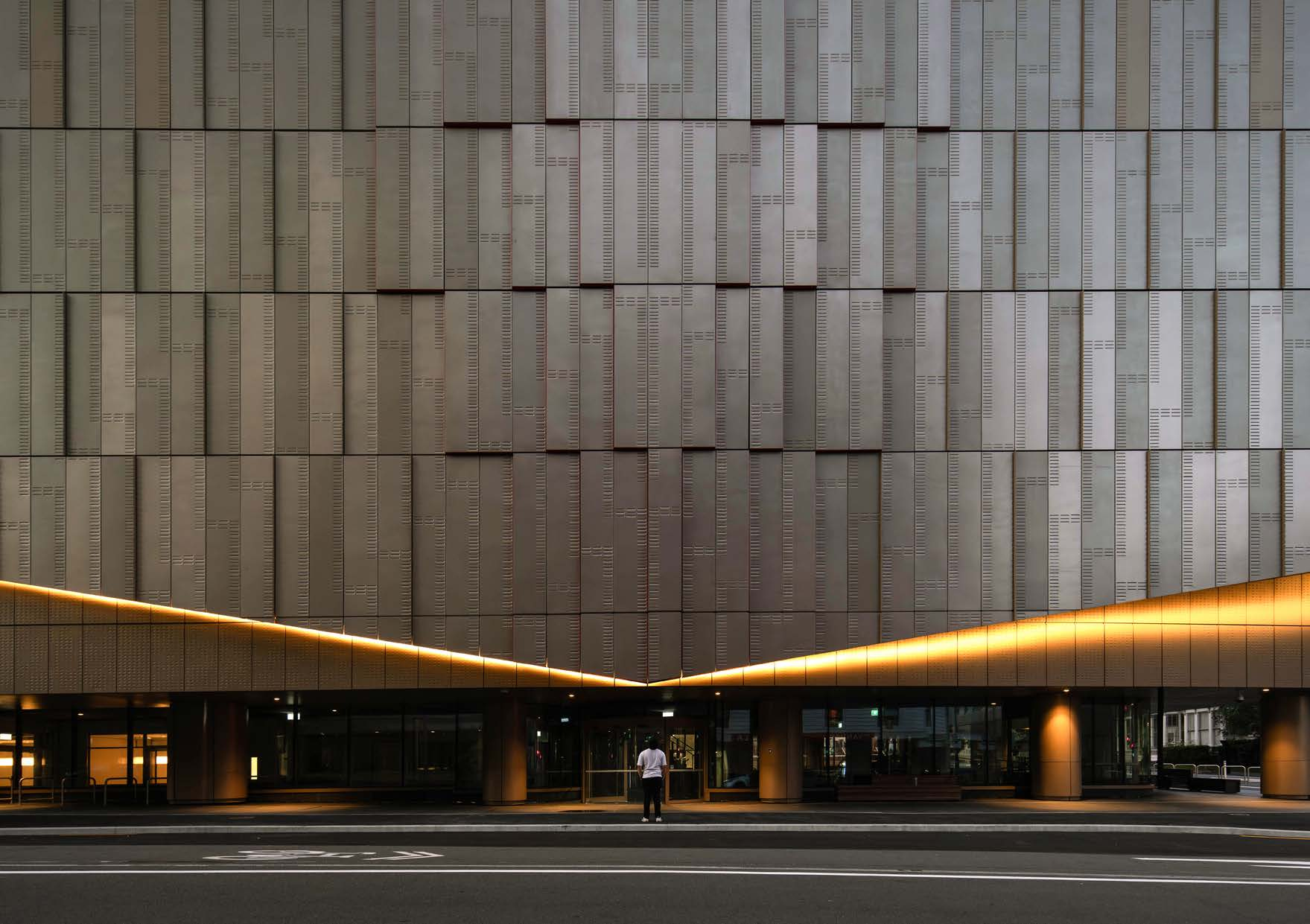
Te Rua Archives New Zealand - Designed by Warren and Mahoney in collaboration with Tihei Ltd

The practice was founded by Miles Warren in 1955, and with the award of the Dental Nurses Training School (now known as Central Nurses' Training School) Miles sought the assistance of his fellow atelier colleague Maurice Mahoney. In 1958, the partnership of Warren and Mahoney was established.

Since then, the practice expanded across New Zealand, opening major studios in Auckland, Wellington, Tauranga, Dunedin, and Queenstown. In 2000, Warren and Mahoney opened studios in both Sydney and Melbourne as a result of winning major contracts and competitions in each location. In Australia it has subsequently delivered major and award-winning projects such as the Northcote Aquatic Centre which won the Best in Category - Architectural Design award at the Victorian Premier's Design Awards.

Now a fourth-generation multi-disciplinary practice, Warren and Mahoney offered design services including architecture, interior design, landscape architecture, masterplanning and urban design, digital design and BIM, sustainability, graphic and wayfinding design, visualisation, and an in-house Indigenous Design Unit.

== Legacy ==
The partnership between Maurice and Miles created a distinctive form of architecture utilising a modern, brutalist style (described by Warren himself as "constructivist") involving widespread use of concrete and harsh geometric shapes, that became known as Christchurch School. Several of their buildings in this style are now among the highlights of New Zealand modernism: Christchurch Town Hall, Harewood Crematorium, College House and Canterbury Students' Union being but a few. The style was influential within New Zealand, being a partial inspiration for Ted McCoy's Archway Lecture Theatre complex at the University of Otago, among other works.

Miles Warren was knighted in 1985 for his services to architecture and in 2003 named one of ten inaugural ‘Icons of the Arts’ by the Arts Foundation of New Zealand. Sir Miles Warren and Maurice Mahoney retired in the early 1990s.

== Global recognition ==
For three consecutive years, Warren and Mahoney has received both WAF and WAFx awards from the World Architecture Festival, recognising its work in projects that apply design and innovation to address major global challenges. The practice’s recent WAF accolades include the 2025 Sport Architecture Award for the Hiwa University of Auckland Recreation Centre and 2024 Higher Education and Research Award for the Waimarie Lincoln University Science Facility. Their recent WAFx awards include the 2024 Future Education Award for University of Sydney First Nations College, 2023 Future Health Award for Alexandria Health Centre, and 2022 Future Infrastructure Award for North East Link.

Designed by Warren and Mahoney, Flockhill Lodge, also known as Flock Hill Station, is a 36,000‑acre luxury lodge and historically significant working sheep station located in New Zealand’s South Island. It has been recognised by international publications, including The Financial Times, which has described it as "the chicest sheep station in the world."

In 2023, the practice was named one of the top ten most innovative architectural practices globally by Fast Company. Specific recognition was given to Warren and Mahoney's industry-shaping work in Indigenous and Traditional Owner collaboration and co-design where projects are designed in true partnership with Indigenous peoples.

In 2025, Warren and Mahoney was awarded two luminary awards at the INDE.Awards. The Luminary awarded each year as a high honour that recognises outstanding, industry-iconic practitioners in architecture and design in the Indo-Pacific region.

== Sustainability ==
Warren and Mahoney has been a certified Toitū net carbonzero architectural practice since 2007.

In 2025, the firm launched 'Go Zero', a low carbon design guide for the industry, providing clarity and actionable steps toward reducing environmental impact of the built environment.

== Notable designs ==
=== Buildings ===
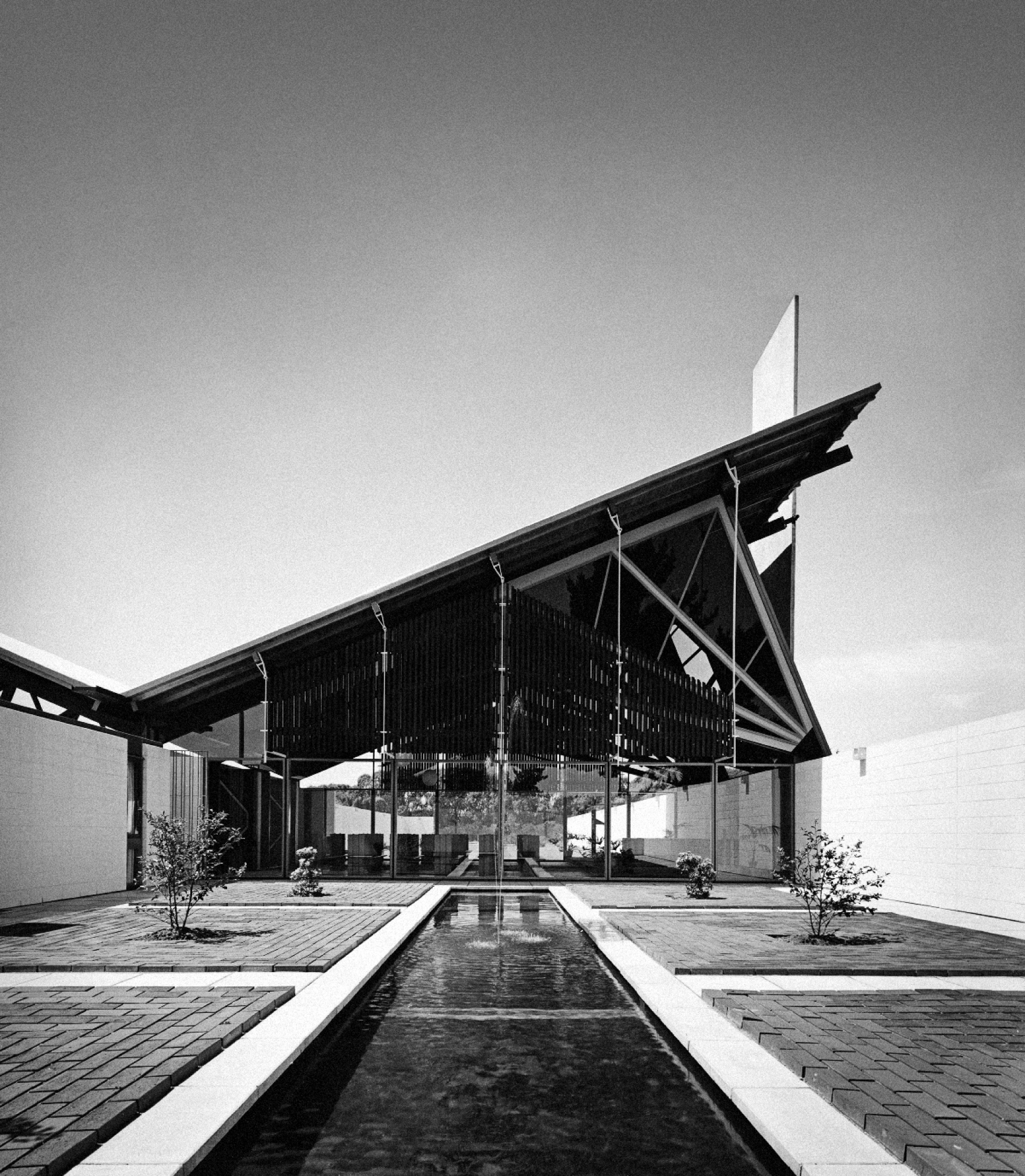
Warren and Mahoney: Harewood Crematorium (1963)

- Harewood Crematorium (1963)
- College House (University of Canterbury) in Christchurch, New Zealand (1966)
- Christchurch Town Hall in Christchurch, New Zealand (1972)
- Embassy of New Zealand, Washington, D.C. (1975)
- Christchurch Central Library (1982)
- Christ's College's Chapman Block, "Big School" library, the sports hall and science block in Christchurch, New Zealand
- Parliament buildings and library, Parliament House in Wellington, New Zealand
- New Zealand High Commission in New Delhi, India
- Parliament building re-design and the Parliamentary Library (1987)
- TVNZ in Auckland, New Zealand (1990)
- Michael Fowler Centre (1983) and Bowen House (1990) in Wellington, New Zealand
- First Church of Christ Scientist, Christchurch (1991)
- Westpac Stadium in Wellington, New Zealand (2000)
- Wellington International Airport in Wellington, New Zealand (2010)
- New Zealand Supreme Court building refurbishment in Wellington, New Zealand (2010)
- Christchurch Blueprint (2012)
- MIT Manukau Transport and Interchange (2014)
- Waterview Connection, Auckland (2017)
- Te Omeka Christchurch Justice & Emergency Services Precinct (2017)
- Commercial Bay (2020)
- Te Pae - Christchurch Convention Centre (2022)
- Taranaki Hospital Renal Unit - Te Huhi Raupō (2022)
- Northcote Aquatic Centre (2023)
- Waimarie - Lincoln University Sciences North, Christchurch (2023)
- Sarjeant Gallery in Whanganui (2024)
- Te Rua Archives in Wellington (2025)
- Hiwa University of Auckland Recreation Centre, Auckland (2025)
- Te Tumu - New Zealand International Convention Centre, Auckland (2026)

=== Monuments ===
- New Zealand Memorial (Korean War) – at the United Nations Memorial Cemetery in Busan, South Korea, built of marble from the Coromandel Peninsula

== Maurice and I ==
Maurice and I is a feature-length documentary documenting the partnership of Miles Warren and Maurice Mahoney and the impact of their work. Directed by Rick Harvie and Jane Mahoney, the film explores their friendship, their influence on architectural identity, and their fight to save the Christchurch Town Hall after the 2011 earthquake.

The film premiered on 1 May 2024 as part of the Resene Architecture and Design Film Festival in New Zealand. Since its release, Maurice and I has screened internationally and received global recognition, including Best Feature Film at the ARQ Arquitectura Film Festival in Santiago and a bronze award at the Architecture Film Festival Rotterdam.
