= New Zealand design =

Design practices in New Zealand

New Zealand design has grown to be a product both of indigenous Māori culture and of European (Pākehā) traditions and practices. The concept of design applies to Māori kaupapa (fundamental principles) as well as to other cultural spheres.

== Māori design ==
Māori concepts of design involve an active relationship between traditional and contemporary practices. Pre-European Māori had no written language, so tribal history, beliefs and traditions were maintained through objects ranging from woven baskets to complex carvings in wood, bone, shell and greenstone.

== Early colonial New Zealand design ==
New Zealand was explored by Dutch, British, French and Spanish visitors, and opened up to the international community by traders, settlement companies and the New Zealand colonial government; European settlement beginning in the late 18th century with the arrival of sealing and whaling crews. The construction of a schooner was started at Luncheon Cove in Dusky Sound in 1790 and completed by castaway sealers in 1795. The Providence was successfully sailed to Norfolk Island. Early colonial housing was influenced by both Western and Māori traditions where whare (Māori houses) were adapted for temporary accommodation. Early colonial house types were shaped by both English, Australian and North American practice. The verandah was a typical colonial addition to the regular Georgian era timber cottage. Furniture was made in New Zealand from the earliest period of colonisation. Whaler's furniture from the lower South Island displayed contemporary American taste.

== 19th century New Zealand design ==
While smaller settlements emerged in the North and South Islands prior to the signing of the Treaty of Waitangi in 1840, the development of New Zealand's urban centres followed the legal sale of land under the British Crown. Small craft-based industries emerged producing necessities for immigrants. Some furniture makers such as Anton Seuffert (1815–1887) worked on a more ambitious level producing complex inlaid pieces for a connoisseur's market.

Industrial manufacturing was spurred by the discovery of gold in Central Otago in 1861. Large firms such as H. E. Shacklock and Co. in Dunedin produced cast iron coal ranges designed for specific New Zealand conditions while Reid and Gray specialised in agricultural implements. A number of foundries specialised in decorative ironwork for the building industry. Steam powered joinery factories such as Guthrie and Larnach's Iron and Woodware Co. in Dunedin published extensive catalogues of fittings; designs often sourced from North America along with the machinery used to produce them.

Early brick-making industries expanded into domestic pottery. Production grew during the 1870s and potteries were established at Milton, Benhar, Christchurch, Wellington and Auckland. R O Clark's Amalgamated Brick and Pipe Co. became Crown Lynn Potteries and later became the largest producer of domestic wares in the southern hemisphere.

Small scale craft production of silverware and jewelry allowed for an idiosyncratic New Zealand decorative idiom to emerge, focusing on the country's unique flora and fauna.

== 20th century New Zealand design ==
New Zealand's isolation from the source of production of many goods encouraged self-sufficiency and the development of manufacturing industries that used local raw materials as well as imported resources. These included foundries, potteries and brickworks, glass works and textile mills.

Industrial scale furniture production began in the late 19th century and expanded so that the main centres each had a range of manufacturers serving different parts of the market. Modernist Scandinavian furniture design was influential in New Zealand. Jon Jansen furniture opened in 1951 and Bente and Kaj Vinther established the Danske Møbler factory and store in Auckland in 1962. The multi-disciplinary design group Brenner Associates was established in 1949 and specialised graphic design agencies including that of Bill Haythornthwaite emerged in the post-war period.

Much industrial, interior, graphic, jewellery and fashion design in New Zealand was influenced by international trends although distinctive New Zealand motifs and iconography were often evident. Flair for experimentation encouraged mechanical inventions such as the jet boat and the John Britten motorcycle. The challenging New Zealand environment and the success of local climbers Like Sir Edmund Hillary stimulated clothing, backpacks and equipment for the outdoors. A more confident handling of Māori, Pacific and New Zealand images and materials emerged in the 1990s.

== Organisations and advocacy bodies ==
The New Zealand Institute of Architects (NZIA), rebranded as Te Kāhui Whaihanga New Zealand Institute of Architects since 2019, an incorporated membership-based professional organisation, was founded in 1905.

Various organisations were established to foster New Zealand design in the aftermath of the Second World War. One of earliest bodies to promote an appreciation of design in New Zealand was the Wellington Architectural Centre, established in 1946. In April 1948 it launched the country's first design publication, the New Zealand Design Review, which it continued to publish until 1954.

The Design Guild, formed in Auckland in 1949, did not survive the year. In Christchurch, a group of interested persons established the Design Association of New Zealand (DANZ) in 1960. A design practitioner body, the New Zealand Society of Industrial Designers (NZSID), originally named New Zealand Society of Industrial Artists, formed in May 1959 by group of largely British-trained Auckland-based designers, modeled on the British Society of Industrial Artists (SIA), was incorporated on 27 September 1960.

The Department of Industries and Commerce, headed by its permanent secretary Bill Sutch, began investigations into the possibility of establishing a national design promotion body, modelled on the British Council of Industrial Design (known since 1973 as the Design Council) in April 1958. This work led to the formation of the New Zealand Industrial Design Council (NZIDC), established under the terms of the Industrial Design Act 1966. Although significantly under-resourced, the council functioned from November 1967 until December 1988 when it was abolished; certain of its activities being derogated to a quality assessment body, TELARC. Finally in 1991 the remaining organisations merged to form the Designers Institute of New Zealand (DINZ), promoting graphic, digital, spatial, motion, industrial, design management, design education, fashion and craft.

Architecture organisations include Te Kāhui Whaihanga New Zealand Institute of Architects, SAHANZ (Society of Architectural Historians, Australia and New Zealand), Architectural Designers New Zealand, New Zealand Registered Architects Board and Architecture + Women NZ (A+W NZ).

Grand Designs New Zealand, modeled on the British television series Grand Designs, is a reality TV show about New Zealand architecture.

Architecture and design is taught at a wide range of tertiary institutions, including the University of Auckland, AUT, Massey, Victoria and Otago Universities, Unitec, Toi Whakaari and Otago Polytechnic.
