= Peter Haythornthwaite =

New Zealand industrial designer

Peter Frank Haythornthwaite ONZM DSc LifeDINZ FIDSA
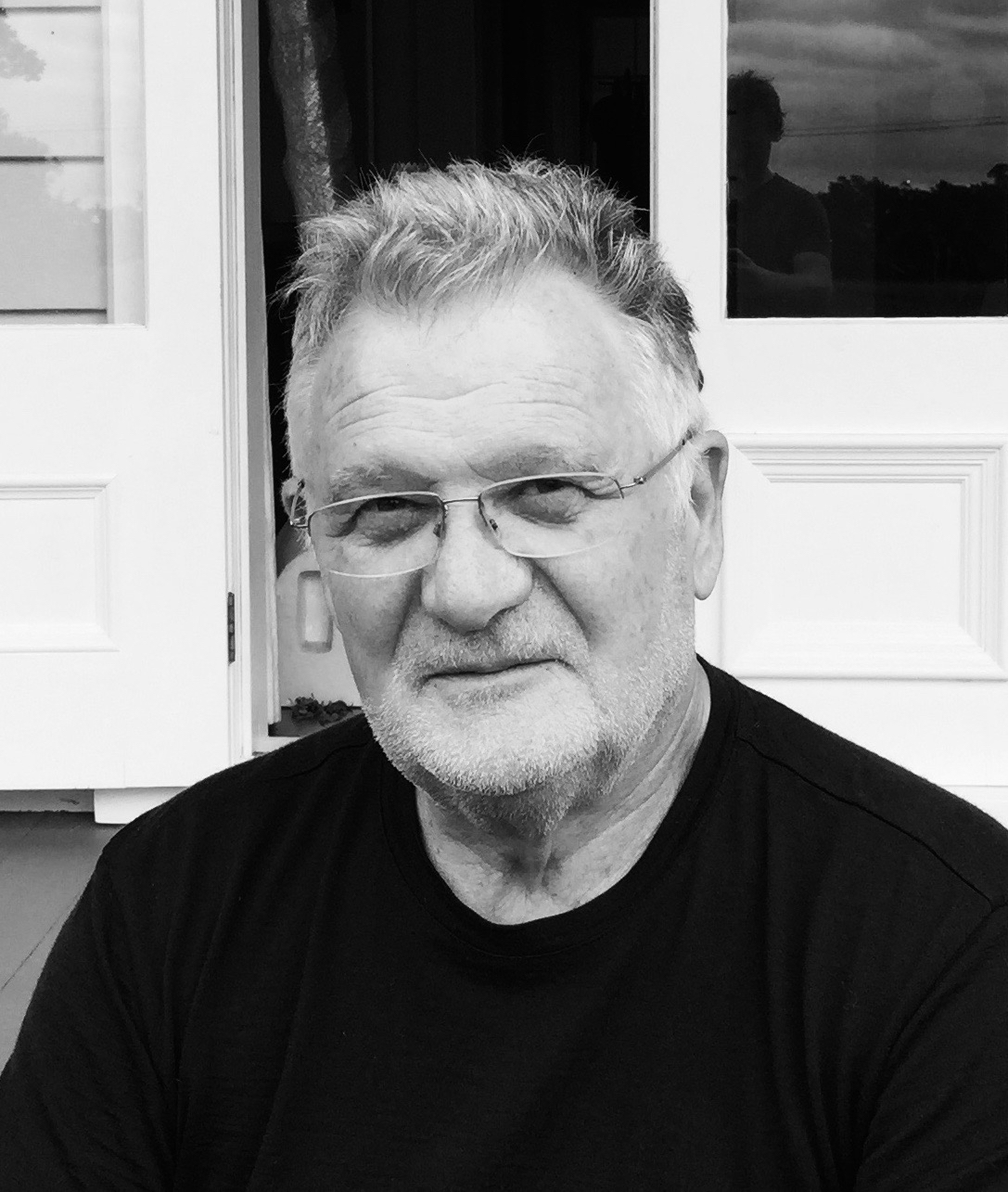
- Peter Haythornthwaite, 2016
- Born: 1944 (age 81–82); Auckland, New Zealand
- Citizenship: New Zealand
- Education: University of Auckland, Elam School of Fine Arts; University of Illinois College of Fine and Applied Arts
- Occupations: Industrial designer, educator, entrepreneur
- Spouse: Carol Haythornthwaite
- Practice: PeterHaythorthwaiteDesign (PHD) creativelab

Peter Frank Haythornthwaite (born 1944) is a New Zealand designer whose consultant practice, entrepreneurial initiatives, contributions to design education, and professional leadership have achieved recognition on many levels. One entrepreneurial project became a 1988 best seller at the Museum of Modern Art (MoMA) shop, and a 2008 design was the first New Zealand product to be selected for the MoMA Permanent Collection.

== Early life ==
Peter Haythornthwaite was born in 1944 to William "Bill" Haythornthwaite (1913–2009) and Ann Haythornthwaite (née Pilkington, 1913–1988) in Auckland, New Zealand. Bill's advertising agency, W. Haythorn-Thwaite Limited (hyphenated to assist pronunciation), established in 1946, was among the first New Zealand design studios to have work included in international journals such as Modern Publicity, Novum Gebrauchsgraphik and Graphis. Along with exposure through international magazines to British, European and emergent Japanese design and designers, strong influences on Peter included Bill's model of design-led quality, creative tenacity, and his learned-from-experience mantra: "When there is no way, make a way".

Peter Haythornthwaite's direct experience of the wider world began in 1953 when the family set off for London so Bill could research the application of the new medium of television to advertising. Bill's grand plan to establish an agency on Madison Avenue, NYC, was thwarted by a US economic recession and issues requiring his attention at the Auckland office. The return voyage through France, Switzerland and Italy laid the groundwork for Peter's global perspective and international standards that characterised his career.

Around 1958, W. Haythorn-Thwaite Limited's client Tasman Empire Airways Limited (TEAL) placed an order for Lockheed aircraft and sent consultants from the Henry Dreyfuss New York design office to Auckland to discuss the interior fitout. When the Haythornthwaites hosted the visitors to dinner, the shy 14-year-old Peter was persuaded to show the gentlemen his drawings of cars. Receiving a pat on the back and some "Keep at it, kid!" encouragement probably initiated the aspiration that surfaced some years later—to one-day work at the Dreyfuss office.

== Education ==
Peter Haythornthwaite arrived at the University of Auckland's Elam School of Fine Arts in 1962 with an open-minded approach to developing his creativity. Awareness of the state local industrial design output came in 1963 when he assisted in mounting a Design in New Zealand exhibition at the school organised by the New Zealand Society of Industrial Designers (NZSID). But it was a second-year project—to design a "sound object"—that drove his future direction. Experienced as a profound "this is what you were made for" epiphany, Haythornthwaite discovered that holistically confronting multi-layered functional and aesthetic requirements with complete trust in the design process, could allow his "intuition" to deliver a coherent conceptual breakthrough. Immersion in the global history and current practice of design leaders was expended through regular visits to the Elam library where he was always first to read new design publications.

Professor Edward J. Zagorski, head of the industrial design program at the University of Illinois, arrived with a growing reputation as inspiring educator when he spent a sabbatical year lecturing at Elam as a 1965 Fulbright Fellow. When Zagorski in retirement visited New Zealand 35 years later, Haythornthwaite recalled his impact:

We experienced a whirlwind of energy and enthusiasm. Ed had the rare ability to inspire students with raw talent to take giant leaps—way beyond their original vision. ... He gave me a new sense of what design could be.

After graduating from the Elam School of Fine Arts with a DipFA Hons (Design), Haythornthwaite took up Zagorski's suggestion and continued his studies at the University of Illinois. He took his qualification to Bachelor level, then spent two years undertaking the Master's program. His thesis project, an under-water propulsion unit, expanded his active interest in scuba diving and led to his first post-graduate job.

== Design life ==
Joining the AMF Voit sporting goods division in California from early 1969 aligned with Haythornthwaite's interest in water sports. Although employed as an engineer, Peter set out to demonstrate the industrial designer's approach: "I wanted to fully investigate the physical and emotional relationship of a product to its user as well as creating elegant form and functionality." When financial pressure forced AMF Voit to downsize, Haythornthwaite joined Eldon Industries Inc. His experience designing office stationery products was to become useful over a decade later when he established his entrepreneurial är'ti-fakt-s enterprise. Haythornthwaite's ambition to work with Henry Dreyfuss Associates (HDA) in New York City was realised in 1970. Although Henry Dreyfuss had retired, the commitment to human factors was progressing through the leadership of Niels Diffrient, Haythornthwaite's supervising partner. A Diffrient dictum that made a lasting impression was, "For heaven's sake, don't start doing any design work, even sketching, until you've got all the facts." Over 14 months Peter worked on many projects for long-standing HDA clients including John Deere and Bell Telephone Company.

Before returning to New Zealand to lecture at the Elam School of Fine Arts, Haythornthwaite made a point of visiting designers he had read about as a student. These included Raymond Loewy Associates, the George Nelson practice known for office furniture designed for Herman Miller, James F. Fulton (who later became editor of I.D. magazine) and Albrecht von Goertz, famed BMW car designer.

In 1971, when Haythornthwaite began teaching Basic Design, Communication Design and Industrial Design at Elam, the New Zealand Society of Industrial Designers (NZSID) had been building membership for over a decade and the New Zealand Industrial Design Council (NZIDC) was in its fifth year. He found opportunities to meet the requirement to undertake "real world" assignments while teaching. His first professional project, a 1972 corporate identity for Temperzone, led to product design assignments.

Haythornthwaite had maintained a friendship with Charles "Chuck" Pelly since they worked together at Henry Dreyfuss Associates. In 1977 he moved his young family to California to join Pelly's five-year-old DesignworksUSA consultancy where he learned much about the challenge, stimulus and business of running a design practice, especially when he graduated to the role of office manager. A year later, the needs of a growing family favoured a return to New Zealand.

Welcomed back to Elam in 1978, Haythornthwaite balanced teaching with a growing stream of projects commissioned by Sonata Laboratories. With enough work to enable full-time practice, he completed the year at Elam, moved his studio from home to a heritage building and installed a workshop to establish the PeterHaythornthwaiteDesign (PHD) consultancy. As the workload grew, extra product and graphic designers were employed, and the office relocations included a new building he designed. When the economic cycle reduced the flow of commissioned work, Haythornthwaite initiated entrepreneurial projects to keep his staff gainfully employed.

PHD ran for 21 years under Haythornthwaite's direction. Many industry awards affirmed its leadership in an increasingly competitive field. Aged 55 and ready to seek new challenges, Haythornthwaite sold his practice to his three associates and on 1 June 2000 PHD became phd3. He established creativelab as a home studio where he attempts a better work/life balance, including by inviting his young adult sons and other emergent designers to collaborate.

Curiosity, conviction and a sense of adventure charted Haythornthwaite's direction. His designs demonstrate a consistent commitment to honesty, clarity, simplicity and sensitivity. His curiosity and sense of adventure influenced a career path which could have continued in the United States. Clients and their customers benefited from his choice to return home (see case studies below), as did the New Zealand profession as a whole.

== Strategic leadership ==
When Peter Haythornthwaite returned to New Zealand in 1971 he wrote to the NZIDC about the criticism it was facing for awarding its designmark label to products which only met objectively measurable criteria. His letter initiated a fully documented cross-disciplinary discussion, published in the NZIDC Designscape magazine, about including the essential aesthetic element of design. A decade later, speaking at the NZIDC Product Design for Tomorrow seminar, he expanded the conversation by advocating for design to be positioned at the centre of corporate culture as "a philosophy that should be embedded at the very heart of the company".

As president of NZSID (1981–1983) Haythornthwaite facilitated talks to the local profession from visiting overseas designers including Roberto Lucci, Rick Valicenti and Chuck Pelly. In 1992 he arranged for Niels Diffrient and his tapestry artist wife Helena Hernmarck to visit and deliver Design Week lectures. Haythornthwaite's encouragement of design students included establishing the Kent Student Design Award in 1982 and helping to initiate the James Dyson product design award in New Zealand.

NZSID merged with an interior design association to become the Designers Institute of New Zealand (DINZ) in 1991. As its 2000–2001 president, Haythornthwaite wrote thoughtful and challenging columns for each issue of its official journal, ProDesign.

When Haythornthwaite chaired The Best Design Awards committee in 1997, he supported its evolution through a critical phase by providing organisation and administration through his design practice. The following year he helped consolidate its viability by co-establishing a joint venture company with the publishers of ProDesign to facilitate the input of sponsors and volunteers as well as the Designers Institute which eventually took full responsibility for what is claimed to have become Australasia's largest annual showcase of design excellence.

In 2001 the New Zealand Government's Heart of the Nation Report included design among the creative industries that could benefit from government support. Responsibility for the creative industries was placed with the newly established Ministry of Economic Development (now MBIE). Commissioned to produce a Design Industry Scoping Study, the Massey University School of Design recruited Haythornthwaite to generate the core content. He was later appointed to the resulting Design Industry Taskforce. Its 2003 Success by Design strategy recommended enabling business to embrace design as a core value—as advocated by Haythornthwaite 22 years earlier.

While MBIE were digesting the strategy, Haythornthwaite formed the Equip Design Integration consultancy with Ray Labone and Andrew Jones to explore models for implementation. Their "learning-by-doing" experience with Macpac developed a process for transforming companies from product-pushed to design-led. That pilot project directly informed the Business Enable component of the Better by Design (BBD) programme established under MBIE's New Zealand Trade and Enterprise operation. Equip, PwC and Deloitte provided the three teams contracted to deliver the programme by integrating business strategy, industrial design, brand development and communication design skills.

Among the BBD clients to retain Haythornthwaite as a mentor was hospital bed manufacturer Howard Wright Ltd. CEO Bruce Moller summed up the contribution:

Peter keeps us on 'true north'. He brings a really good design eye and asks a lot of questions. Most importantly, he gets the design team thinking for themselves so they will find their own answer. His approach is gentle but firm ...

New Zealand's innovative approach to design leadership was exported to Australia in 2012 when the Victoria State Government commissioned Equip to develop its Design 2 Business (D2B) programme. In 2015 Haythornthwaite led a successful design education visit to Denmark for senior managers of D2B graduate companies, some of whom described it as "transformational". In 2017 Equip stepped back while Australian consultants continued the D2B evolution. In 2024 it remains as an element of the Victorian R&D Tax Incentive.

== Family ==
Peter met Carol when he was living and working in California; They married seven months later in October 1969. Each of their four sons has created a career in design:

Michael (b. 1975) studied fashion design at RMIT, and has worked as a Senior Designer for a series of Australian apparel firms.

David (b. 1977) took a self-directed, learning-by-doing approach which took him to Xiamen, China, where he has designed award-winning products for US, German and Chinese clients looking to supply global markets from China.

Andrew (b. 1980) completed industrial design degrees at Massey University, Wellington, and the Royal College of Art (RCA), London. He established Studio Alt Shift with his wife and fellow RCA graduate Shai Akram.

Simon (b. 1981) undertook work experience in the United States and Germany before completing a Diploma in Marketing Communications at Auckland University of Technology (AUT). His entrepreneurial enterprises include cwic footwear.

== Awards and recognition ==
As well as numerous accolades from many sources including The Best Awards, Australian Good Design Awards, International Design Excellence Awards (IDEA), SEGD Global Design Awards, Design Plus and iF Product Design Award, Peter Haythornthwaite was made an IDSA Fellow in 2022—the second New Zealander to receive that honour (Jo Sinel became a Fellow in 1965). Peter's contribution to New Zealand design leadership has been recognised in numerous ways including:

2003: John Britten Award—the premier DINZ award—recognises "leadership, vision and achievement both in New Zealand and internationally".

2012: Honorary doctorate conferred by Victoria University of Wellington, Te Kura Hoahoa / School of Design Innovation, in Wellington. The citation at the ceremony read:

Peter Haythornthwaite has produced some of New Zealand's most original, creative and outstanding industrial design. He is an inspirational figure who has enriched the creative life of this country. Victoria University, an institution committed to the creative disciplines and which recognises design as a knowledge-based subject, is proud to recognise his immense contribution towards excellence in design.

2016: Officer of the New Zealand Order of Merit (ONZM) appointed in the Queen's Birthday Honours list.

2018: A survey exhibition at Objectspace and a book entitled Design Generation: how Peter Haythornthwaite shaped New Zealand's design-led enterprise.

== Selected designs ==
Temperzone identity, 1972. Temperzone was Haythornthwaite's first major client. The logo has remained in use, with a recent refresh, for over 50 years.

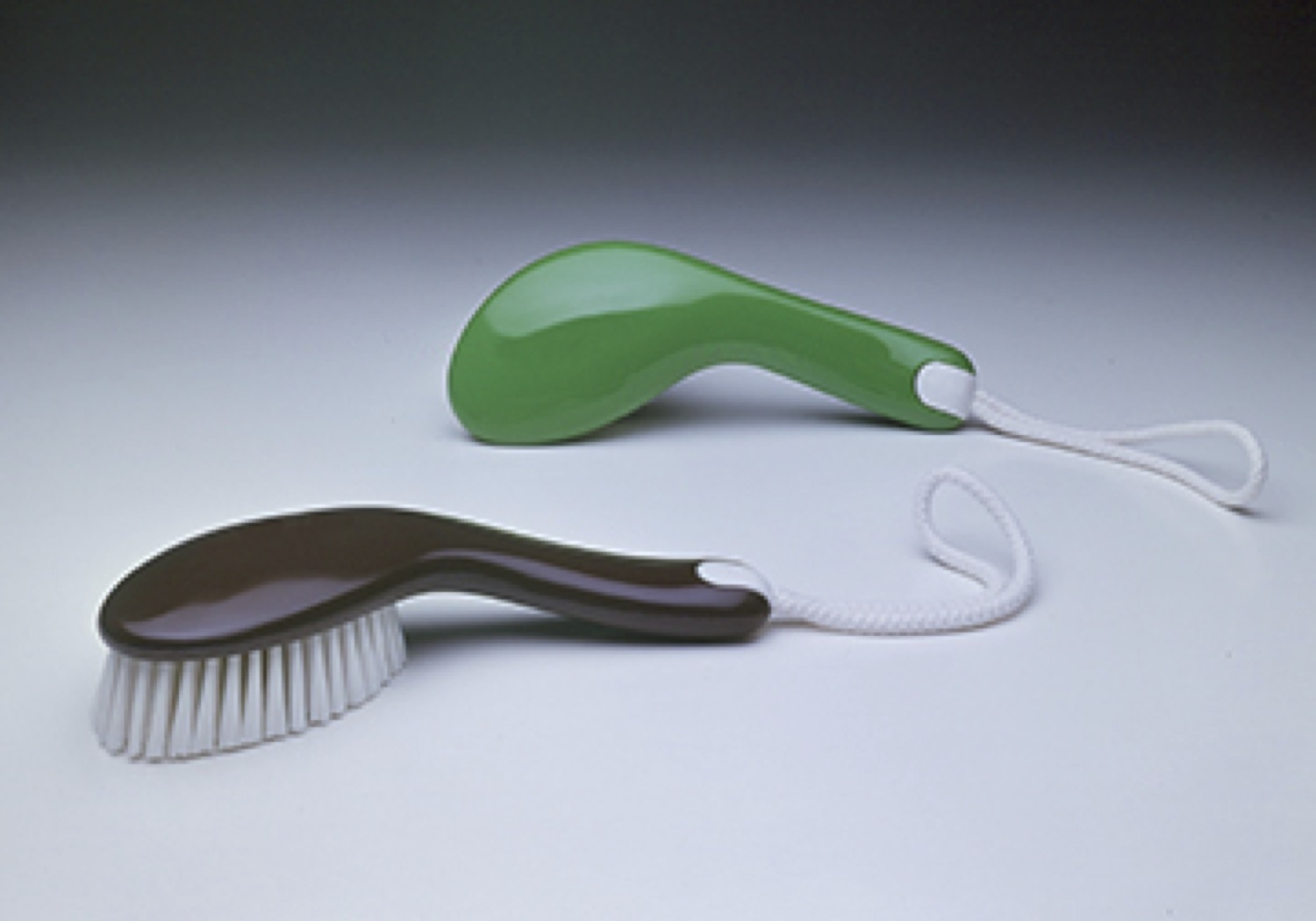
Merryware body brush, 1978–1979.

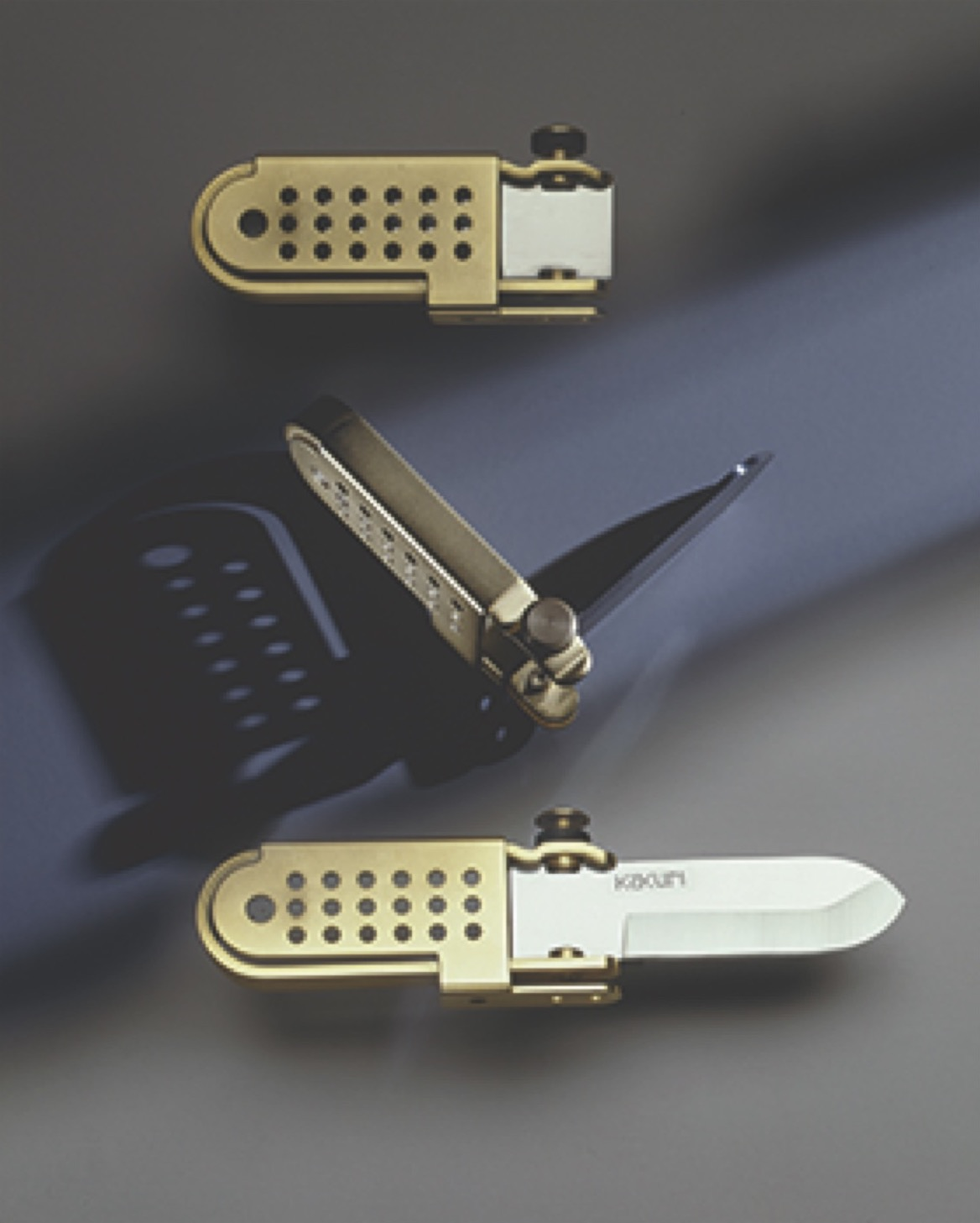
Kakuri side-lock pocket knife, 1989–1993.

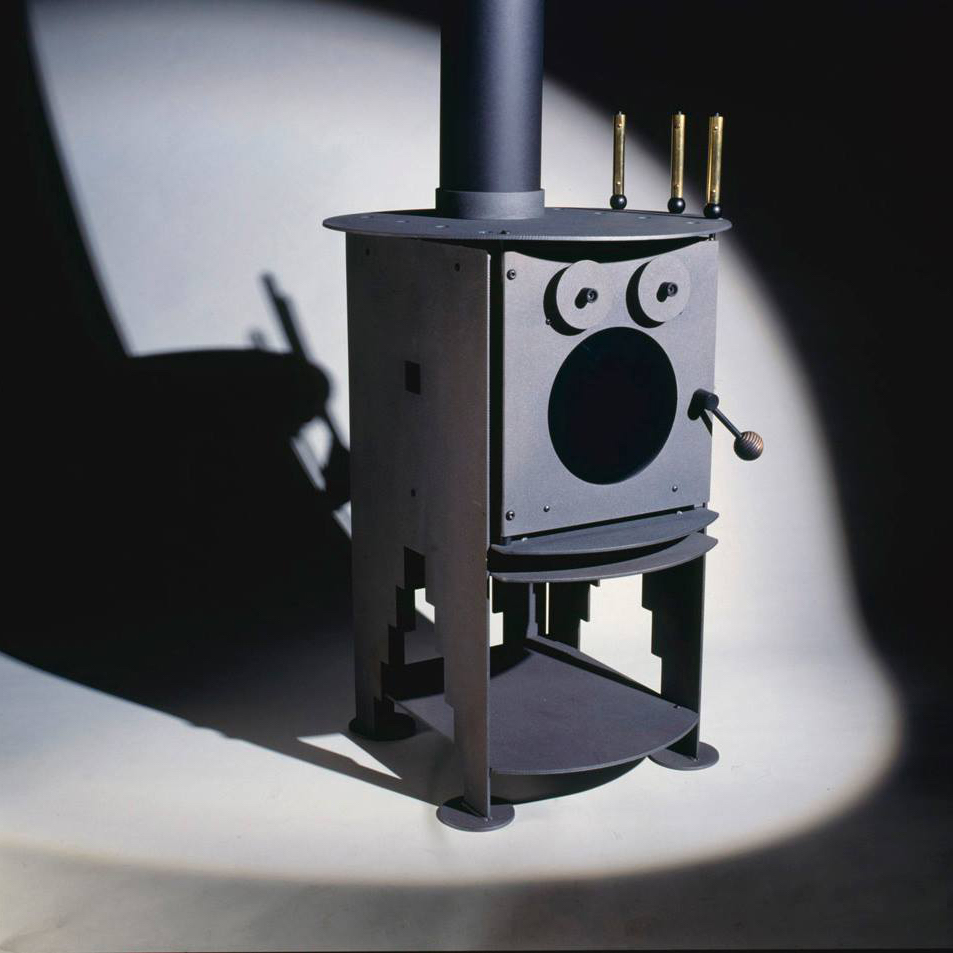
Ooh-Ah stove, 1991.

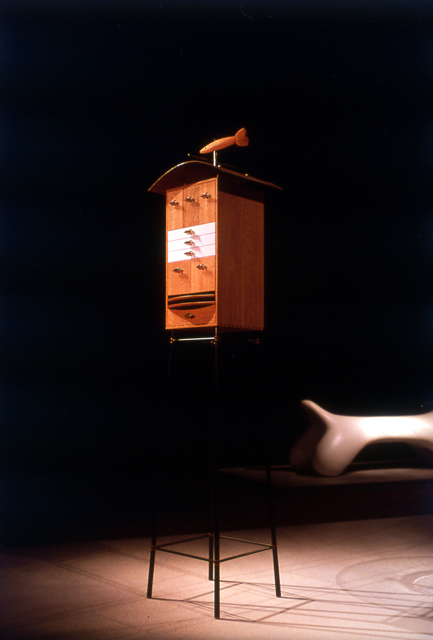
Gone fishin' fly cabinet, 1992.

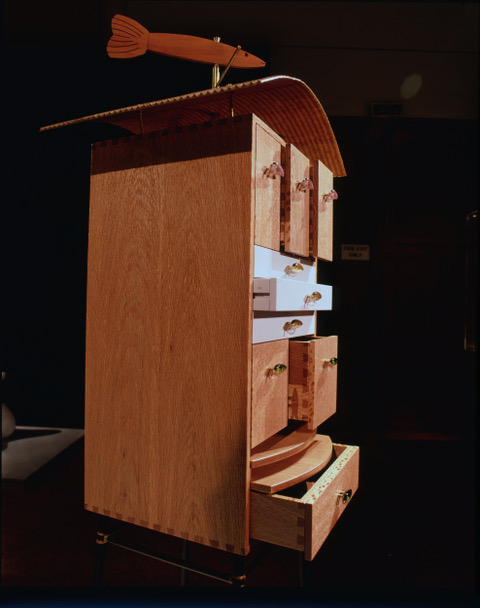
Gone fishin' fly cabinet detail, 1992.

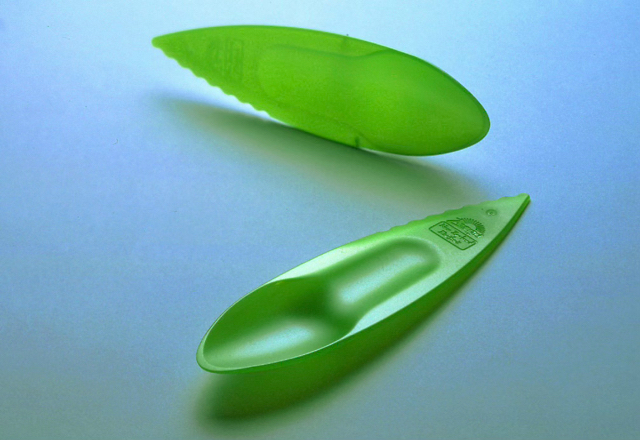
Zespri kiwifruit Spife (spoon-knife), 1998.

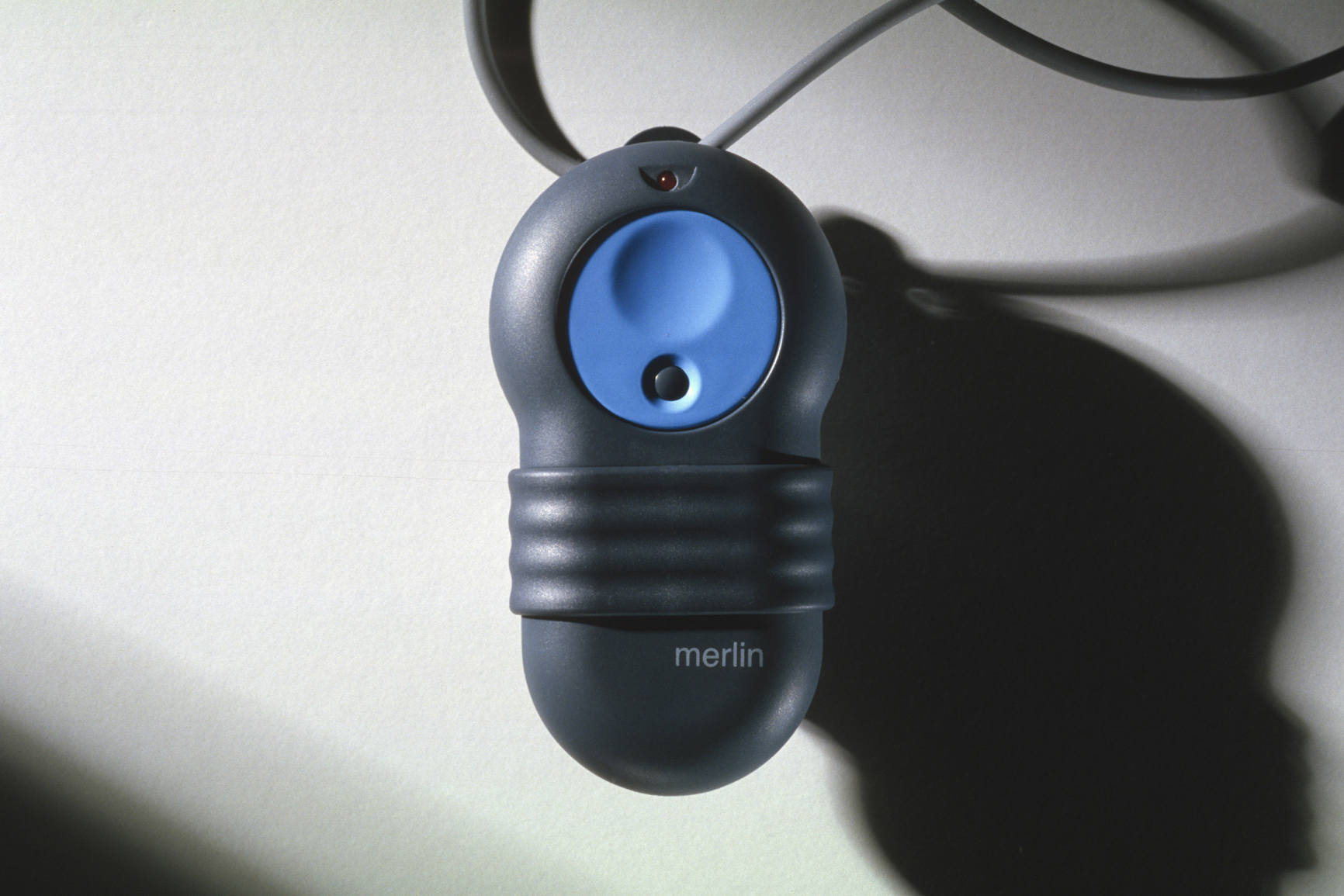
Merlin M802 remote control unit for garage doors, 1997–1999.

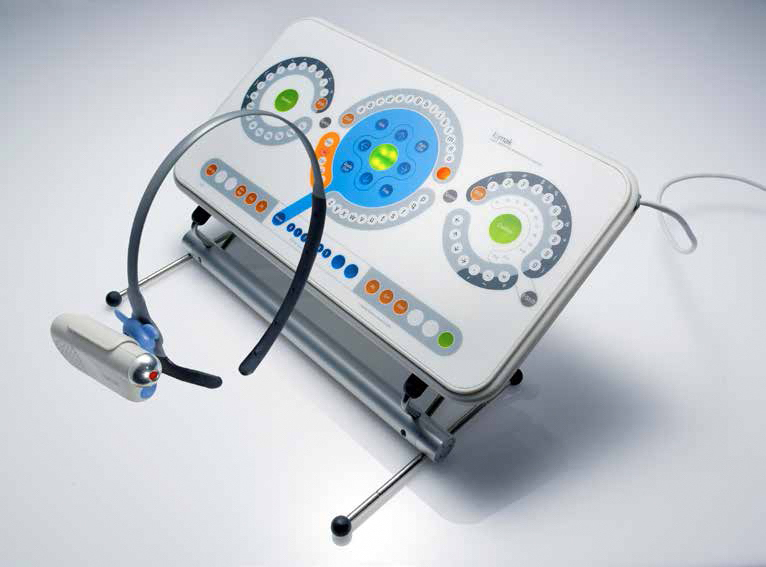
LOMAK, Light Operated Mouse and Keyboard, 2002–2006.

=== är'ti-fakt-s ===
In a 1993 article published in the IDSA Innovation and DINZ ProDesign magazines Haythornthwaite recommended that design schools prepare students to create successful design-focused businesses. As well as design they should learn strategy, marketing and financial management as well as social and environmental responsibility. Explaining his main motivation for putting his words into action he said: "As a painter has to paint, I had to design and make." He saw a need, designed a response and set up the entity required to take the outcome to market.

Carol proposed the är'ti-fakt-s brand name. The FlipFile was the first of a suite of products distributed in Japan by Apex Marketing and North America by Stelton USA. As the German representative for är'ti-fakt-s, Henrik Gacnik encouraged Haythornthwaite to visit the annual Messe Frankfurt Ambiente trade fair and ensured är'ti-fakt-s products were entered in design awards in Frankfurt, Hanover and Stuttgart—where they won accolades.

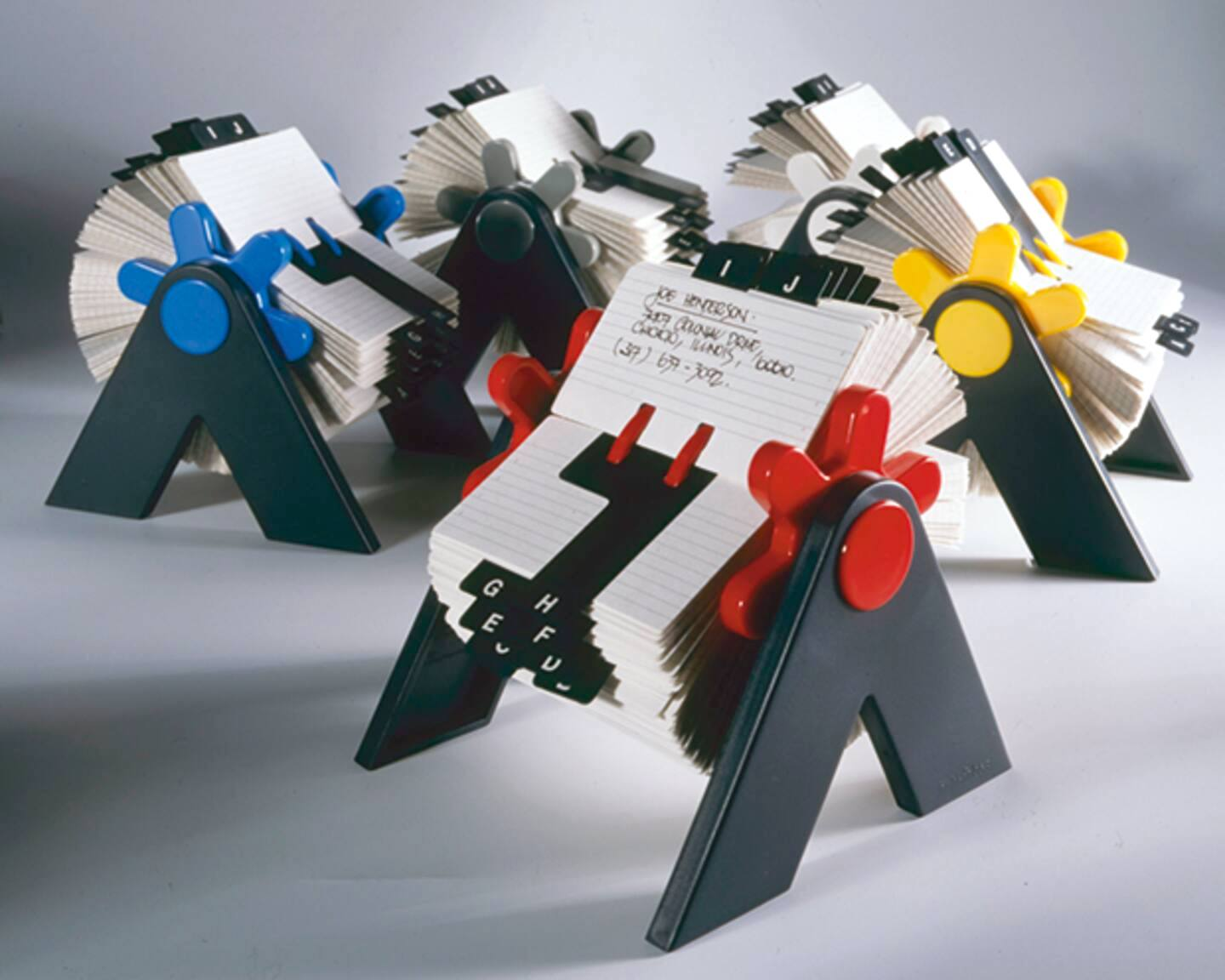
är’ti-fakt-s FlipFile, 1979–1980.

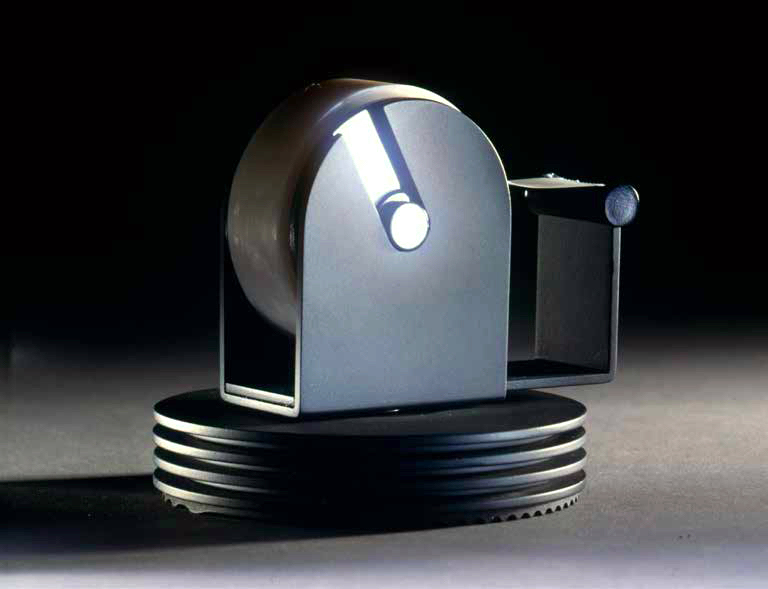
är’ti-fakt-s Saturn tape dispenser, 1988.
