= Paul Beadle =

New Zealand sculptor and medallist (1917–1992)

- Paul Beadle
- Born: 25 November 1917; Hungerford, Berkshire, UK
- Died: 28 December 1992 (aged 75); Auckland, New Zealand
- Known for: Sculptor, medallist

Paul John Beadle (25 November 1917 – 28 December 1992) was a New Zealand sculptor and medallist.

== Early life and training ==
Born in Hungerford, Berkshire, England in 1917, Beadle studied cabinetmaking and building construction at Cambridge Art School for two years before going on to the London County Council Central School of Arts and Crafts. He also studied privately under sculptor and carver Alfred Southwick. He went on to Copenhagen to study in the studio of Kurt Harald Isenstein, where his classicist style and leanings began to develop.

== World War II ==
When World War II began, Beadle enlisted in the Royal Navy (1940), and served with the Home Fleet, Mediterranean Fleet and the Pacific Fleet until 1943. In 1944 he travelled to Australia in the Submarine Service as a submariner-artist—staff artist for the Pacific Post, Daily Newspaper of the British Pacific Fleet, Fleet Publications (1945). Following the war and discharge in Sydney (1946) he stayed on in Australia, working for Australian newspapers and taking up teaching—National Art School, East Sydney (1947).

== Career ==
In 1950 he became a foundation member of the Society of Sculptors and Associates in Sydney. For six years from 1951, he was the head of the Art School at Newcastle Technical College. He was Principal of the South Australian School of Art 1958–1960 and president of the Royal South Australian Society of Arts 1958–1959.

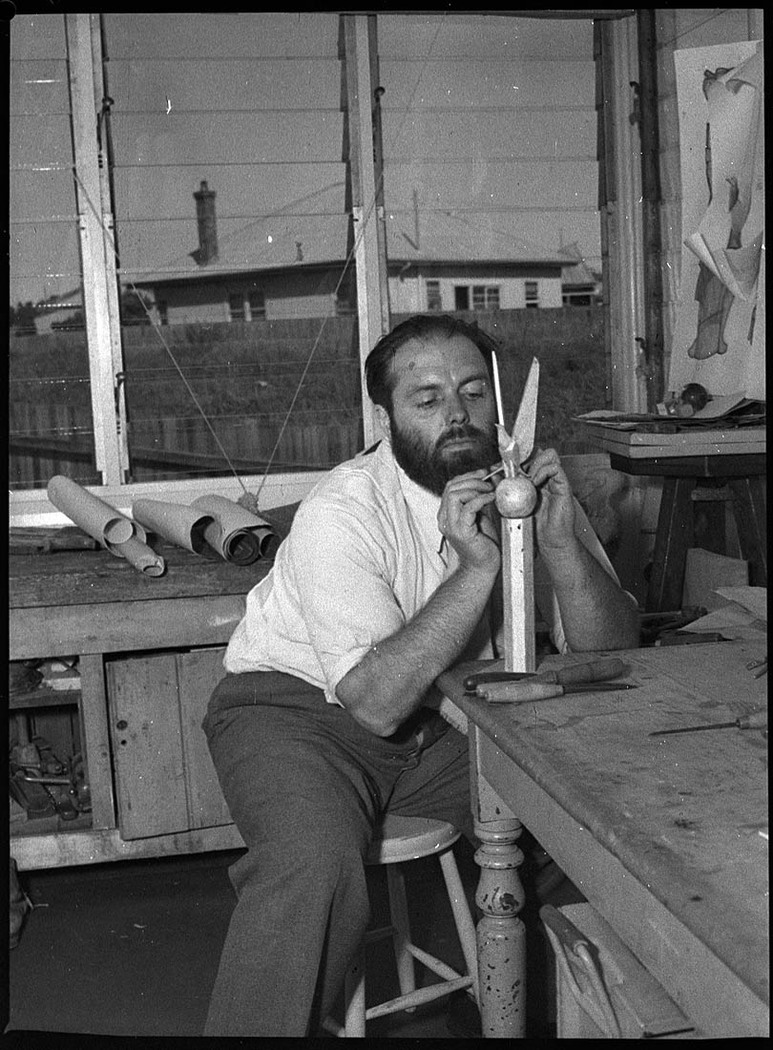
Beadle modelling the American eagle for the Australian–American Memorial in January 1953. Photo: Sam Hood

In 1953–1954 he created the stylised American eagle perched upon a bronze sphere surmounting the octagonal tapered column of the Australian–American Memorial in Canberra.

In 1961 he moved to Auckland to become Professor of Fine Arts at the University of Auckland. Between 1961 and 1975 he was also the Dean of Elam School of Art. He was the foundation president of the New Zealand Society of Sculptors and Associates in Auckland in 1962. He was also a Fellow of the Royal South Australian Society of Arts, president of the New Zealand Society of Industrial Designers (NZSID) from 1962 to 1963 and vice-president of the Design Association of New Zealand (DANZ) from 1963.

Beadle's sculptural work drew upon influences from the Hallstatt Culture of the early Iron Age, West African Ashanti bronzes and combined these with references to life in modern New Zealand. According to art historian Mark Stocker, Beadle was "New Zealand's foremost internationally recognised medal maker."

== Recognition ==
Beadle has exhibited with the New Zealand art association The Group and the New Zealand Academy of Fine Arts. His work is included in the collections of the Auckland Art Gallery Toi o Tāmaki, Museum of New Zealand Te Papa Tongarewa, the Australian National Gallery and the state galleries of Sydney, Perth and Adelaide. University of Auckland offers the Paul Beadle Scholarship annually for postgraduate students at Elam School of Art.
