= Frank Carpay =

Dutch-born New Zealand industrial designer

- Frank Carpay in his studio
- Born: Franciscus Hubertus Johannes Carpay; 13 July 1917; Heusden, Netherlands
- Died: 12 September 1985 (aged 68); New Zealand
- Occupation: Industrial designer
- Known for: Modern ceramic and textile designs
- Notable work: Crown Lynn "Handwerk"

Franciscus Hubertus Johannes Carpay (13 July 1917 – 12 September 1985) was a Netherlands-born New Zealand industrial designer. He is notable for his modernist approach to ceramics at Crown Lynn, New Zealand.

== Early life ==
Frank Carpay was born in Heusden, The Netherlands on 13 July 1917.

He trained at the Hertogenbosch Technical College in 's-Hertogenbosch, where he learned textile design, ceramics, metalwork and graphic art.

== Entrepreneurship ==
After World War II, Carpay joined to a small pottery company named Het Edele Ambacht, where he eventually became head of design. Here, he first decorated earthenware under the name 'Handwerk'.

In 1950, Carpay travelled to the south of France where he met Pablo Picasso and worked at the Madoura Pottery in Valauris. There, Picasso introduced Carpay to two other pottery decorators, Roger Capron and Roger Picault.

Upon returning to the Netherlands, Carpay established his own small commercial pottery in Tegelen, named Ambacht Volendam. An economic downturn and a bad business partner led to the decline of the business, and Carpay returned to work as a graphic designer.

=== Crown Lynn Potteries, New Zealand ===
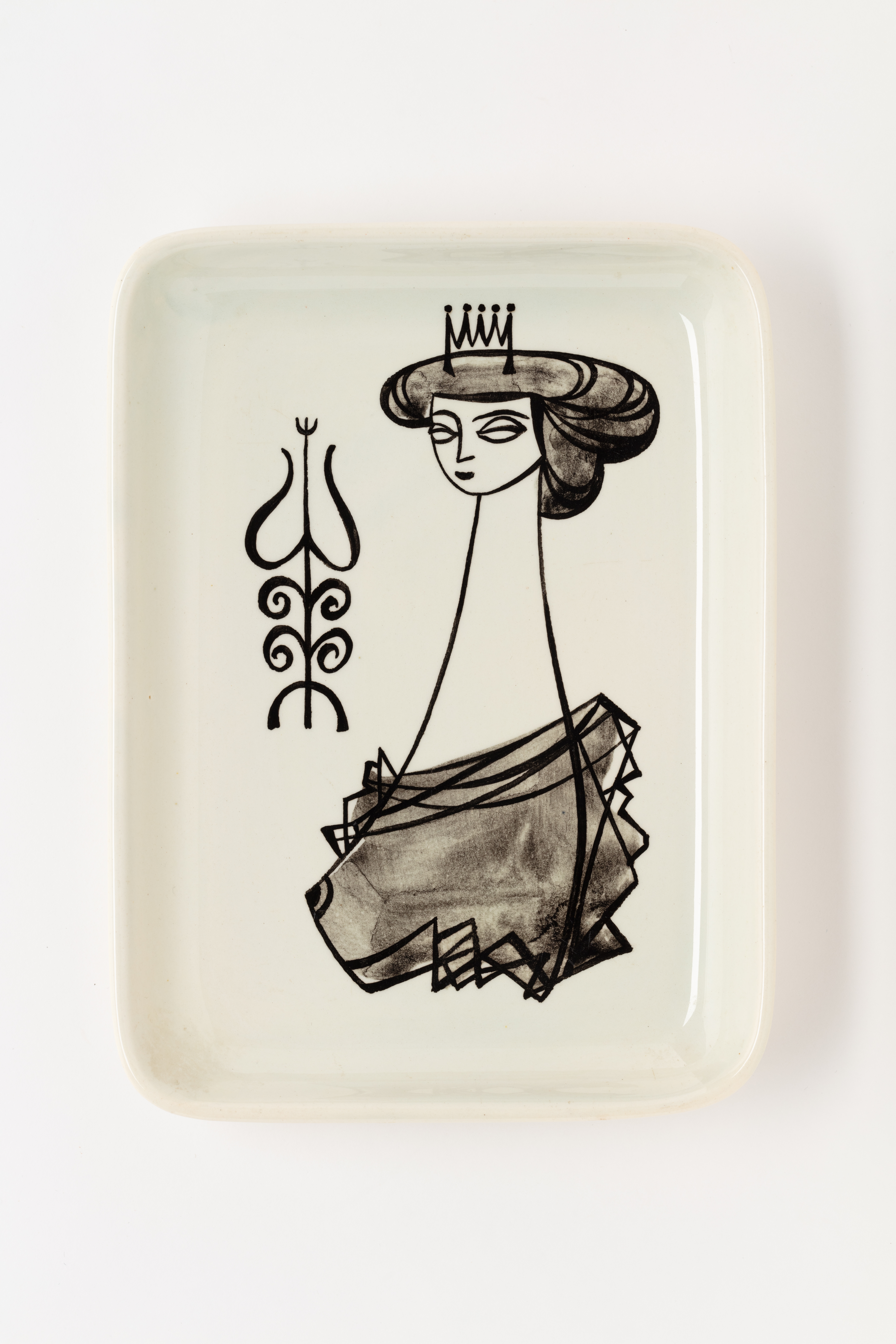
Prototype (1953) of design for Queen Elizabeth's Royal Tour, not produced due to its inappropriateness. CC by 4.0 Auckland Museum Collections Online.

While unemployed, Carpay had written to John Allum, the Mayor of Auckland, New Zealand, asking for the name of any potteries where he might find work. He was inspired to move to New Zealand by a postcard of Auckland with palm trees. This letter was passed to Tom Clark of Crown Lynn Potteries Ltd who was actively recruiting. Carpay emigrated to New Zealand in 1953 with his wife Carla Carpay. Carpay joined the 'Specials Department', which was intended to produce more upmarket works in the Crown Lynn range. Carpay began to use his existing ideas on numerous readymade production line blanks and his one-off designs were intended to go into wider production once approved by the public. Carpay's Handwerk range was first shown at the Auckland Society of Arts in 1953 and was critically acclaimed. He received the Esmonde Kohn Prize for Applied Arts. However, the designs were not well received by consumers, with simplicity and modesty being at the forefront of New Zealanders minds. In fact, Carpay had declared himself on a "war against the rosebuds", referring to the traditional design of mass produced dinner ware in the Crown Lynn factory and in New Zealand. His works were also occasionally risqué, one example being a prototype produced for Queen Elizabeth's 1954 Royal Tour depicting her in a sheer blouse with her nipples on display. Crown Lynn's more traditional ties to England did not merge well with Carpay's modern approach to design. In 1956, Carpay was made redundant.

=== Other Ventures ===
Carpay remained in New Zealand and tried to obtain graphic design related work. Unable to do, Carpay taught at Howick District High School for some years. He also exhibited paintings, gave pottery decorating demonstrations and completed mural commissions.

The art equipment and resources at Howick District High School allowed Carpay to develop his screen-printing techniques and saw him begin work as a textile designer and printer in the late 1950s. He established a screen printing studio in his basement in Titirangi and first printed placemats inspired by Maori rock drawings.

Frank and his wife Carla created a towelling beachwear range, under the name Carpay Designs. Frank would screen-print on the fabric and Carla made the beachwear, including items like cover-ups, beach bags and towels. They continued to draw on Pacific themes for inspiration. They were especially popular within the emerging youth market. When a shipment of imported fabric was found to be faulty in the early 1970s the business was unable to survive, and Frank returned to design commissions.

He was elected to membership of the New Zealand Society of Industrial Designers (NZSID) soon after its establishment in 1960, and served on its council to 1968.

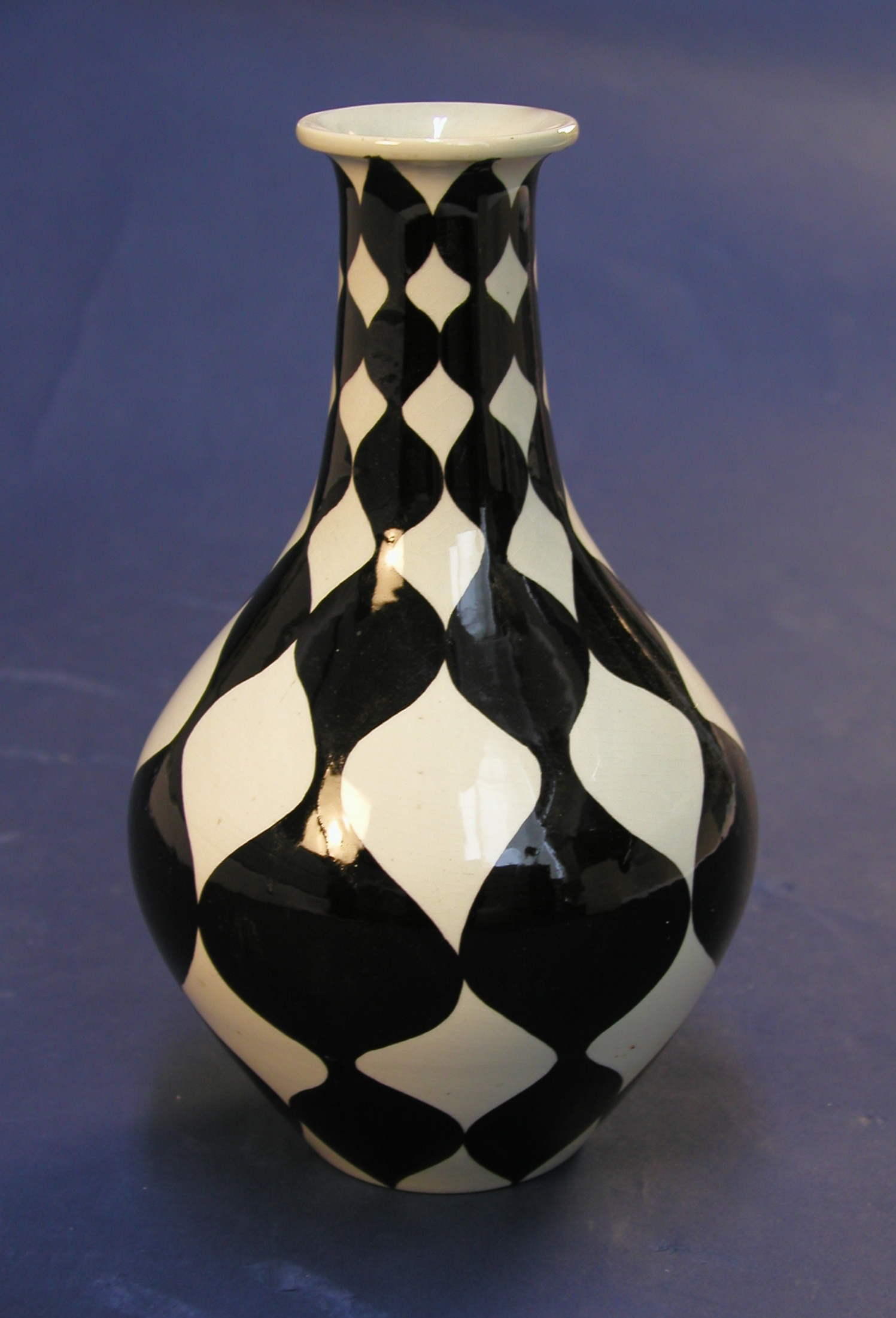
Vase demonstrating Carpay's modern, fluid lines. Auckland Museum Collections Online.

== Design Themes ==
Carpay had previously declined to work at de Delft Blauw factory and his designs have little evidence of Delftware watercolour techniques.

Ceramics made by Carpay were modern and brightly coloured, often with sweeping, fluid lines. His designs have been called 'spontaneous', 'inventive' and 'individualistic', which greatly contrasts with English-made ceramics which tended to have more delicate and 'pretty' designs. Picasso and Matisse were inspirations for his work alongside other European modernists. Common motifs in his work included the dove of peace.

The modern style of Carpay's designs were not very successful in New Zealand around the 1950s and 60s, despite advertisement and promotion efforts. It was Tom Clark's opinion that the work was too unconventional for the more English 'rosebud' tastes of most New Zealanders.

Carpay often signed his works with the cursive 'Handwerk' at the base of the object.

== Legacy ==
Frank Carpay died in 1985. In 2000, his wife donated an extensive collection of his ceramics, textiles, drawings and prints to the Hawke’s Bay Museum. In 2002, his work was exhibited at the Hawkes Bay Museum and the exhibition then toured around New Zealand. They displayed his textiles alongside his ceramics, highlighting his contributions to both industries. His works have now become highly collectable.

== Design Gallery ==
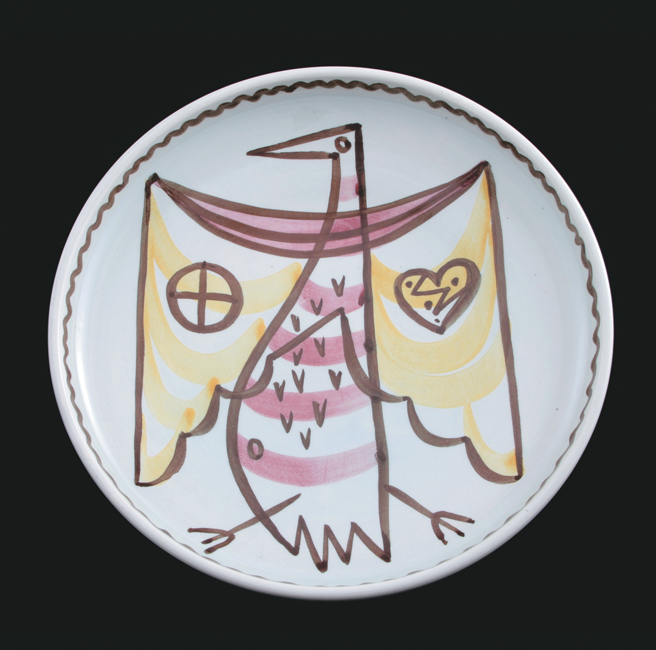
Dish (topside)
Artist: Frank Carpay; David Jenkin; Crown Lynn Potteries Ltd
Auckland War Memorial Museum

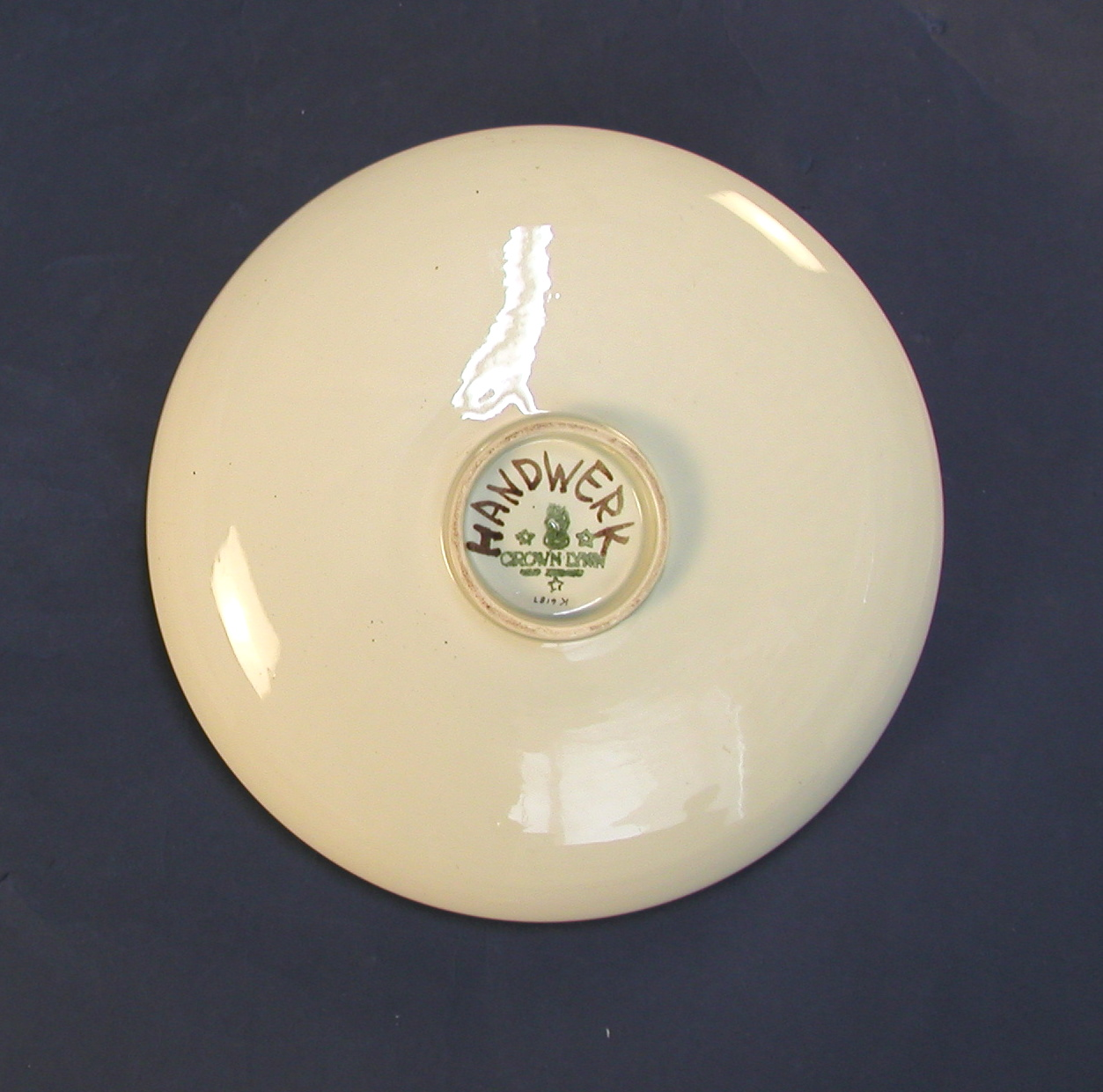
Dish (underside)
Auckland War Memorial Museum

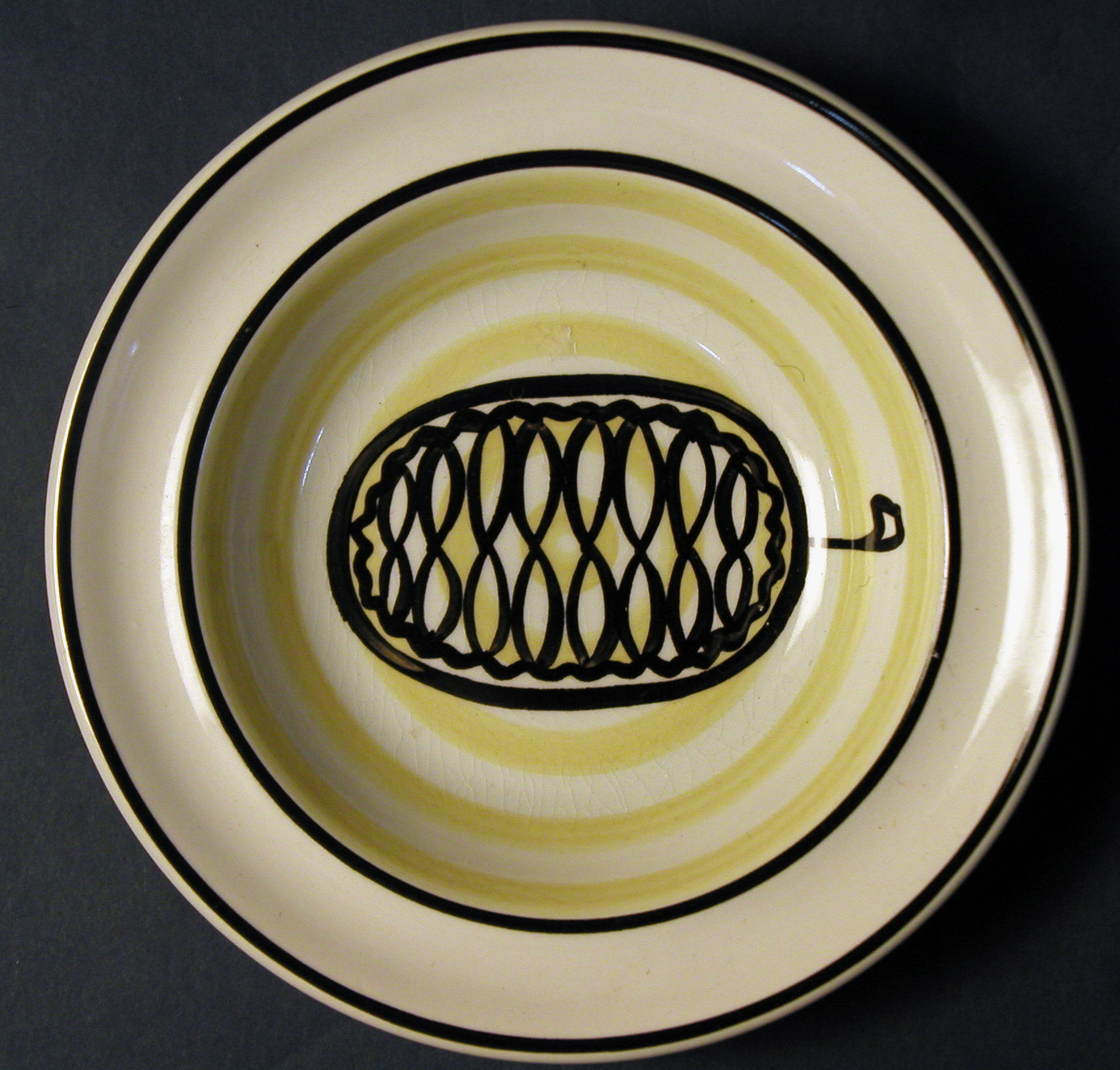
Dessert service dish. Artist: Frank Carpay; David Jenkin; Crown Lynn Potteries Ltd. Auckland War Memorial Museum.

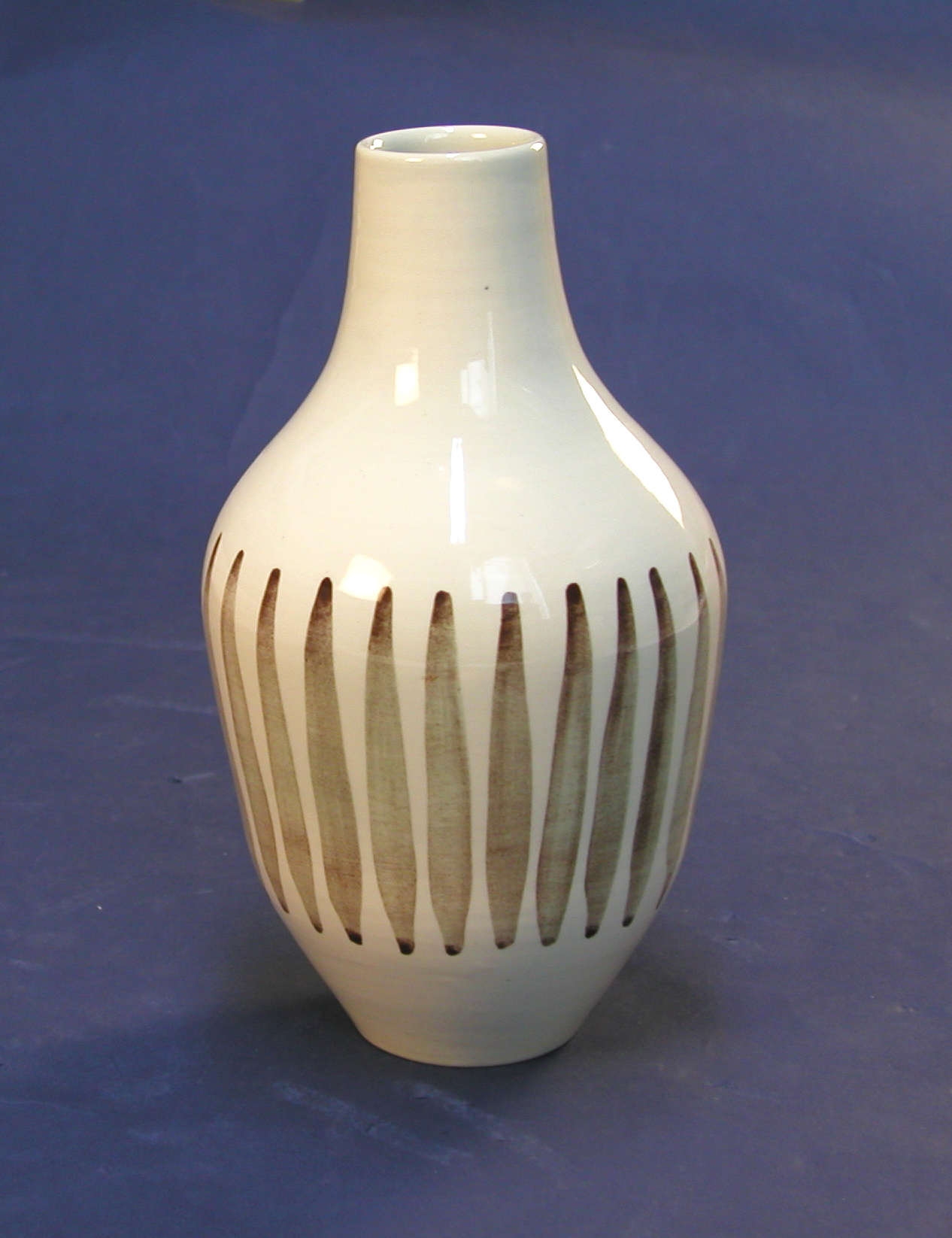
Vase. Artist: Frank Carpay; David Jenkin; Crown Lynn Potteries Ltd. Auckland War Memorial Museum.

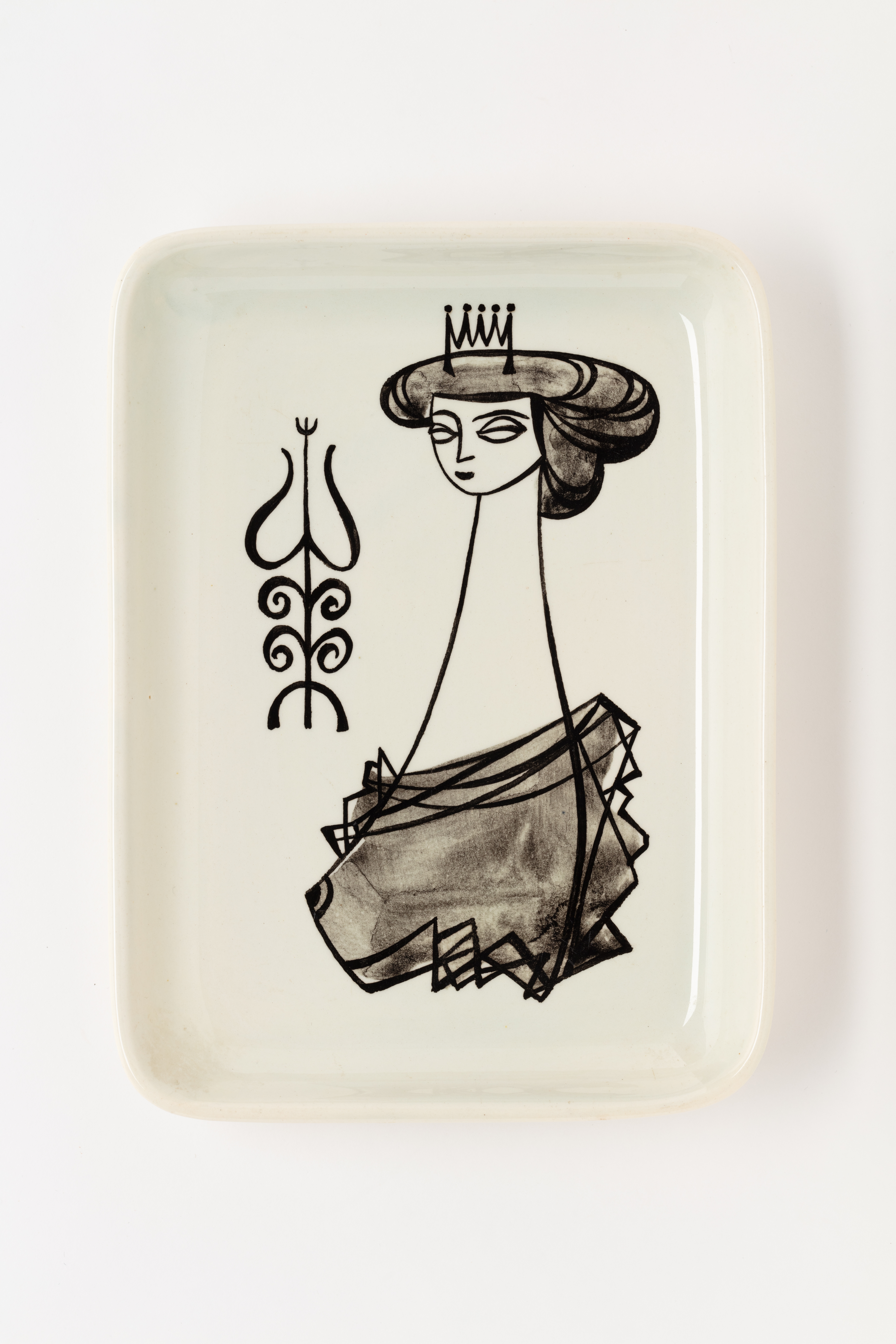
Dish. Artist: Frank Carpay; David Jenkin; Crown Lynn Potteries Ltd. Auckland War Memorial Museum.

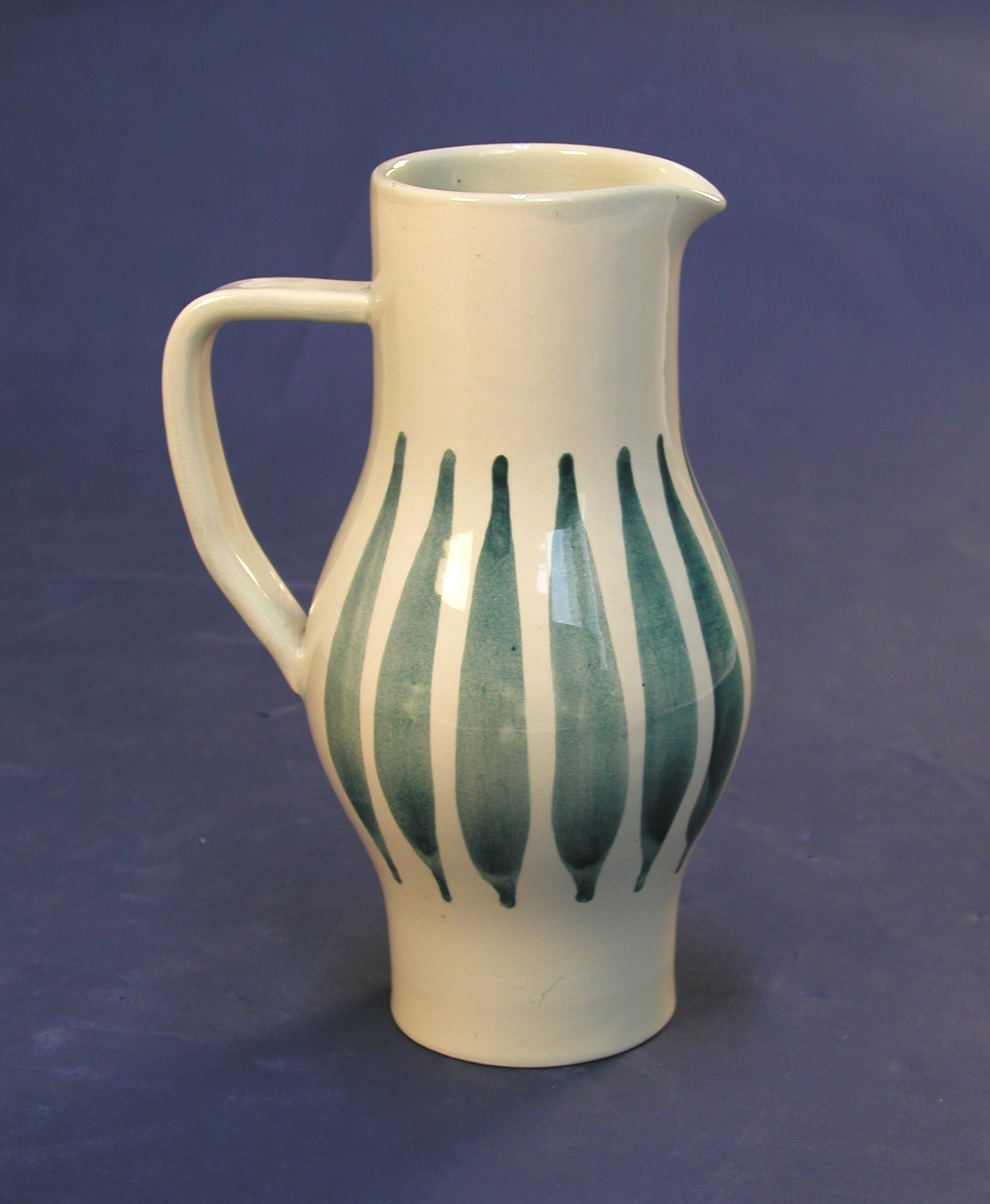
Jug. Artist: Frank Carpay; David Jenkin; Crown Lynn Potteries Ltd. Auckland War Memorial Museum.

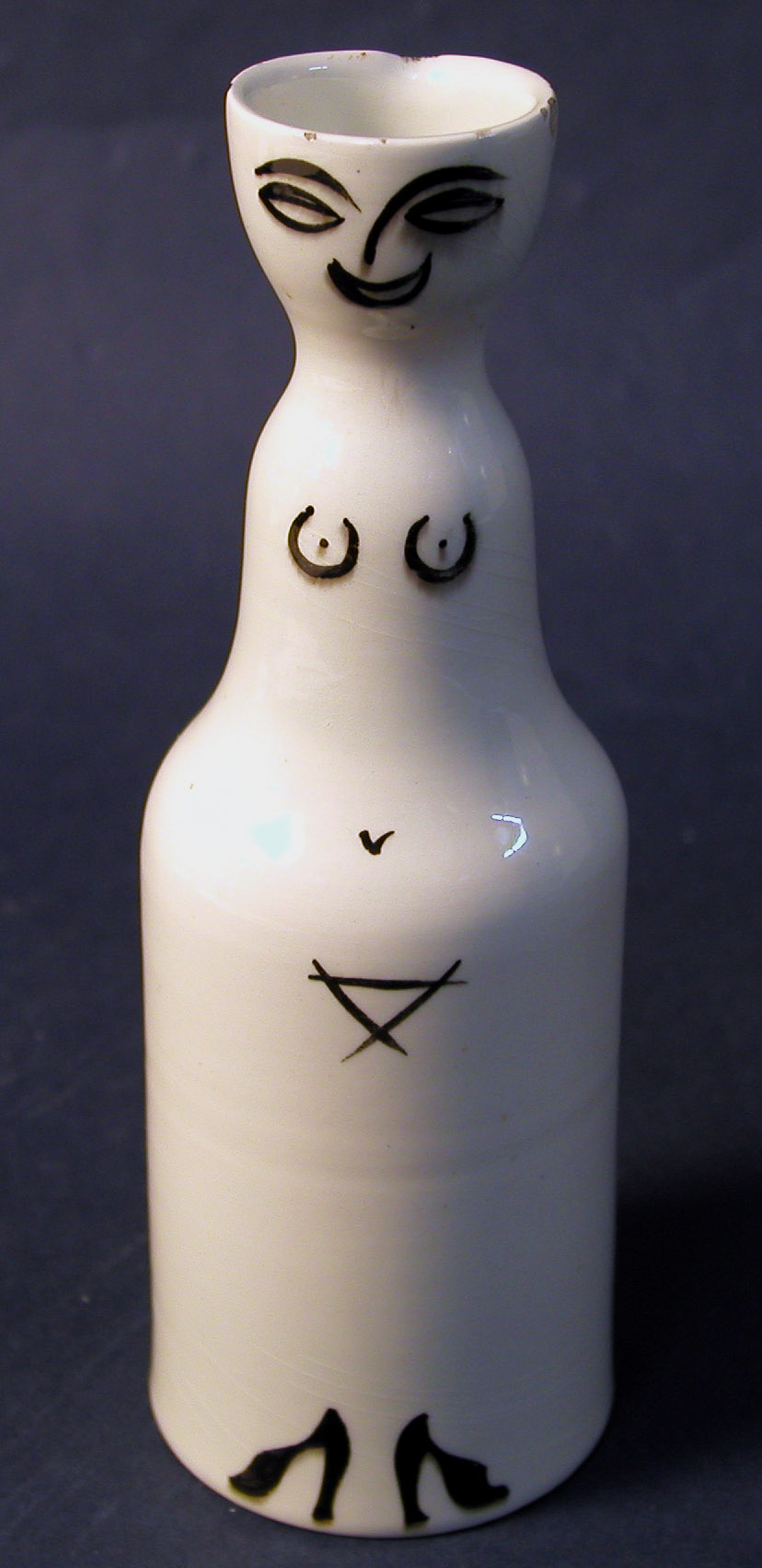
Bottle (front). Artist: Frank Carpay; David Jenkin; Crown Lynn Potteries Ltd. Auckland War Memorial Museum.

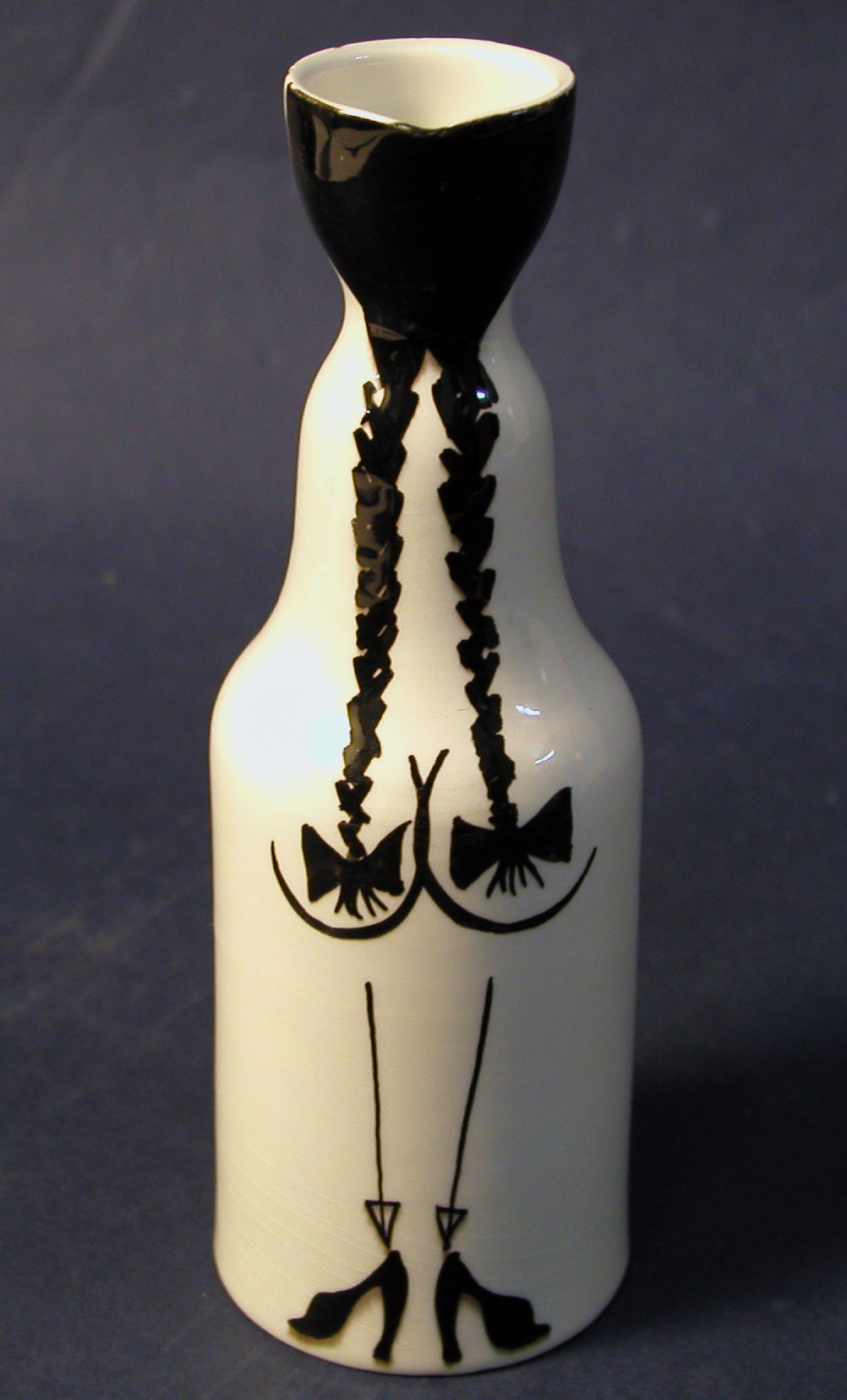
Bottle (back). Auckland War Memorial Museum.

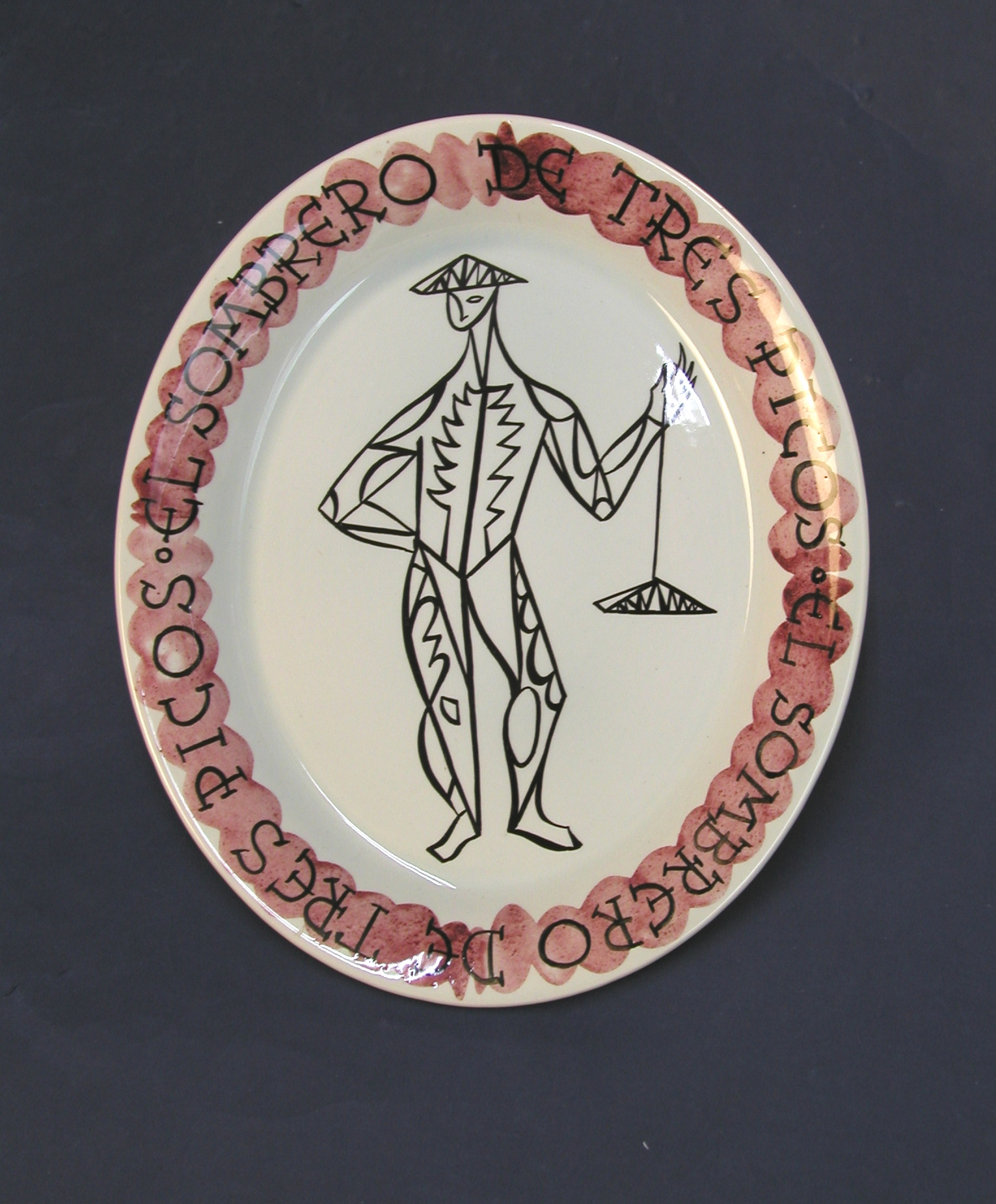
Platter. Artist: Frank Carpay; David Jenkin; Crown Lynn Potteries Ltd. Auckland War Memorial Museum.

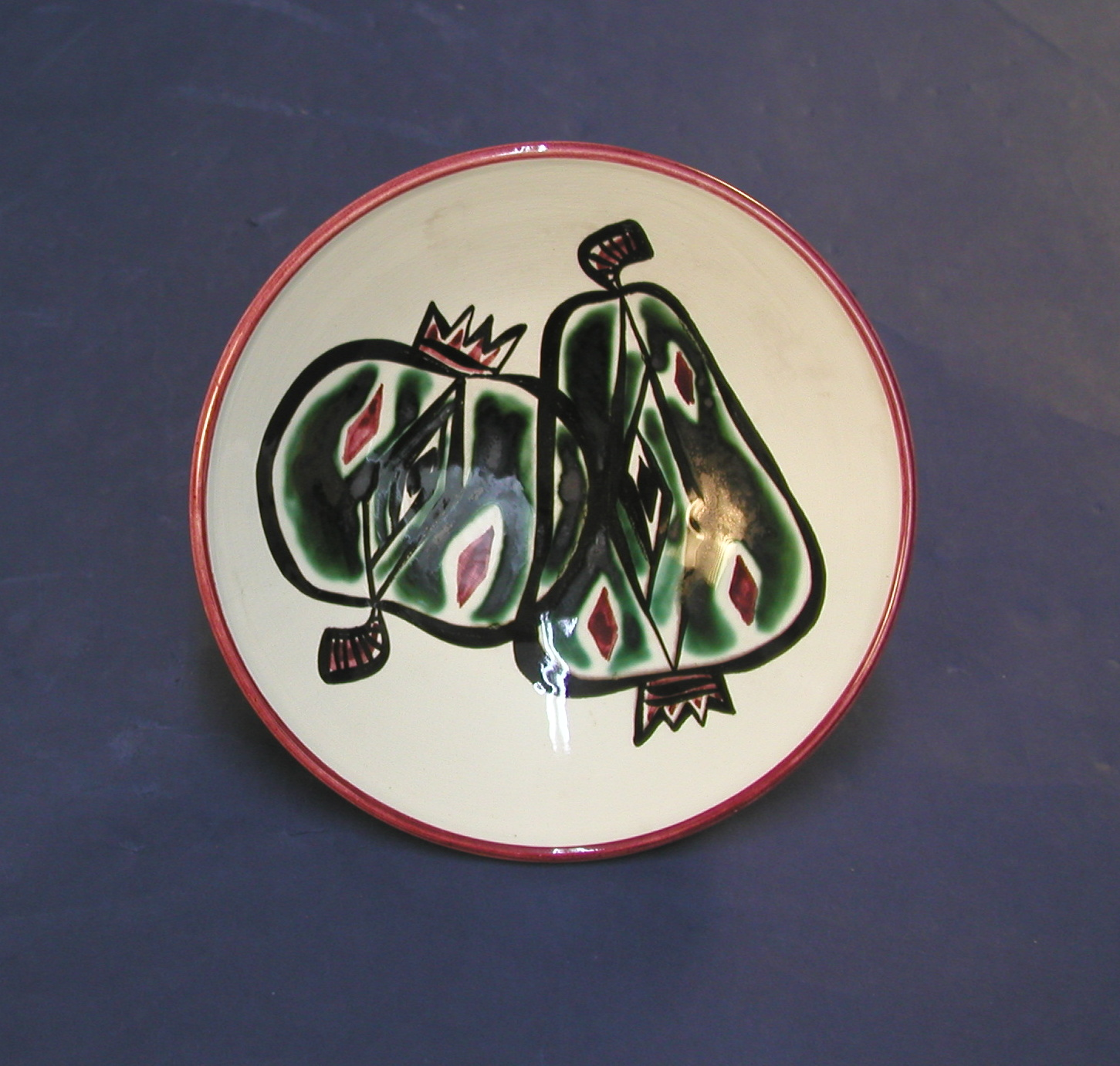
Fruit bowl (top view). Artist: Frank Carpay; David Jenkin; Crown Lynn Potteries Ltd. Auckland War Memorial Museum.

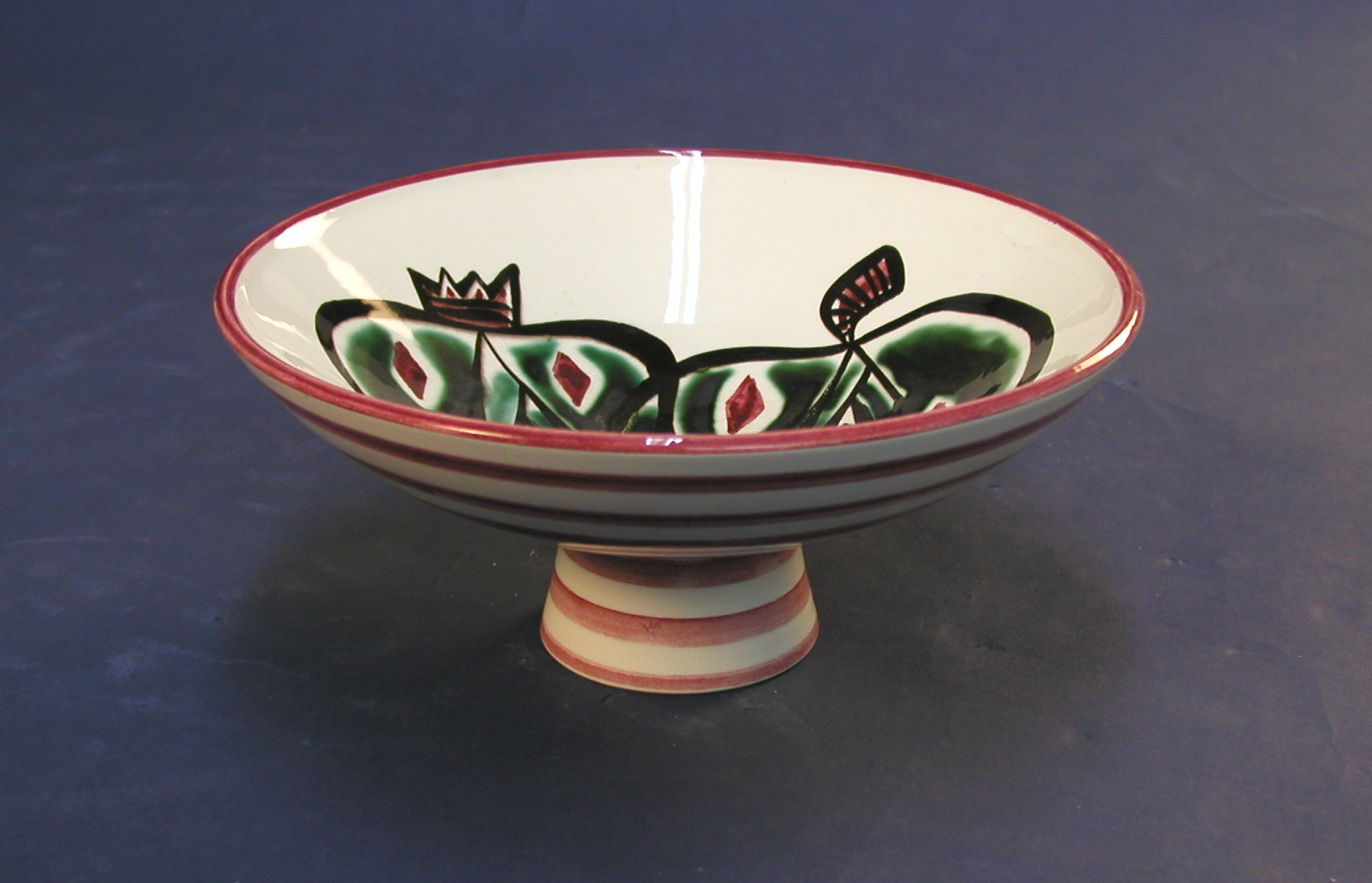
Fruit bowl (side view). Auckland War Memorial Museum.

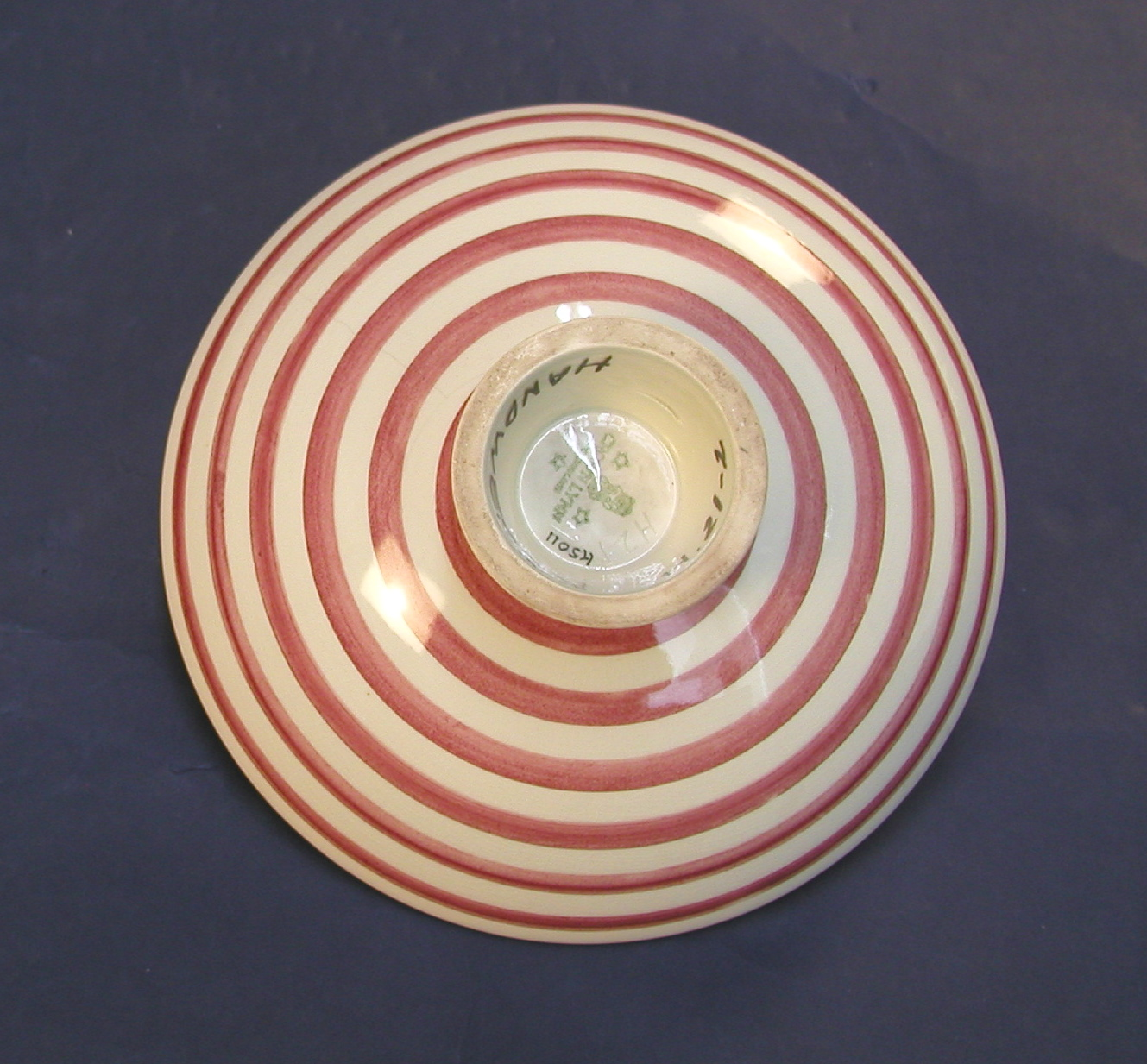
Fruit bowl (underside). Auckland War Memorial Museum.

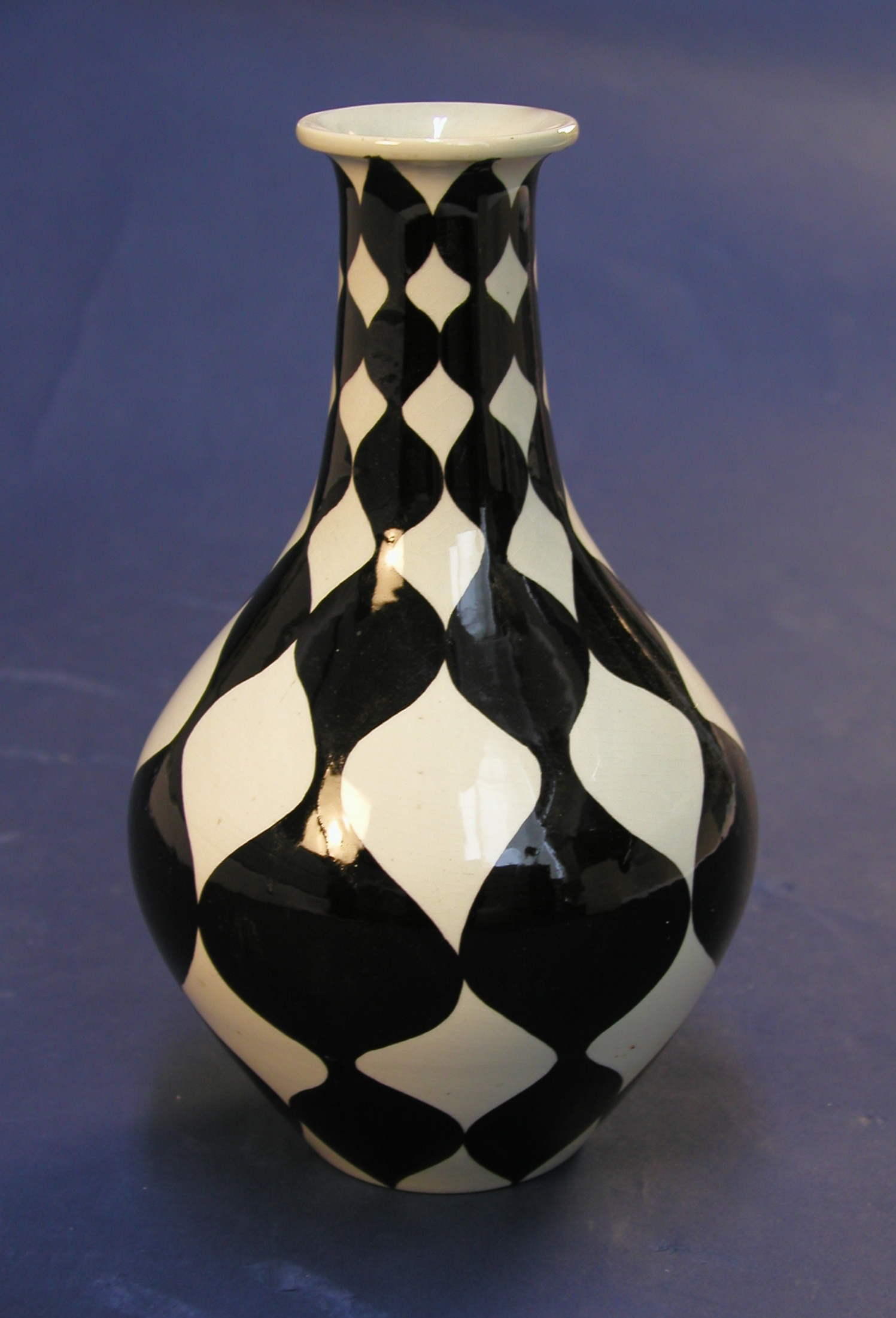
Vase. Artist: Frank Carpay; David Jenkin; Crown Lynn Potteries Ltd. Auckland War Memorial Museum.
