= John Crichton (designer) =

New Zealand furniture and interior designer

- Born: 17 July 1917; Bombay, India
- Died: 7 January 1993 (aged 70); Auckland, New Zealand
- Education: Birmingham College of Art
- Known for: Furniture design, interior design, war photography

John Crichton (7 July 1917 – 7 January 1993) was a New Zealand furniture and interior designer.

== Early life ==
Crichton was born in Bombay in 1917 and moved to England as a child. He studied at Birmingham College of Art. During World War II, he served as an official war photographer with the rank of Captain in the Royal Warwickshire Regiment, 1939–1945, assigned to the Fourteenth Army in Burma.

== Design ==
He moved to New Zealand in 1949, establishing John Crichton Limited, a business and shop located on Kitchener Street in Auckland. He offered interior design services and designed and sold furniture. Examples of his work were published in Decorative Art: The Studio Yearbook. According to Douglas Lloyd Jenkins, Crichton "can lay claim to being the father of the modern New Zealand interior…" showing New Zealanders "how to blend a fascination with the materials and textures of the Pacific with the international vision of modern design."

He was a founder of the New Zealand Society of Industrial Designers (NZSID) in 1959, elected to membership soon after the Society's incorporation in 1960, and served on its council to 1966.

Crichton died in New Zealand on 7 January 1993, and was buried at Purewa Cemetery, Auckland.

== Collections ==
Examples of is work are held in the collections of Museum of New Zealand Te Papa Tongarewa.

== Design gallery ==
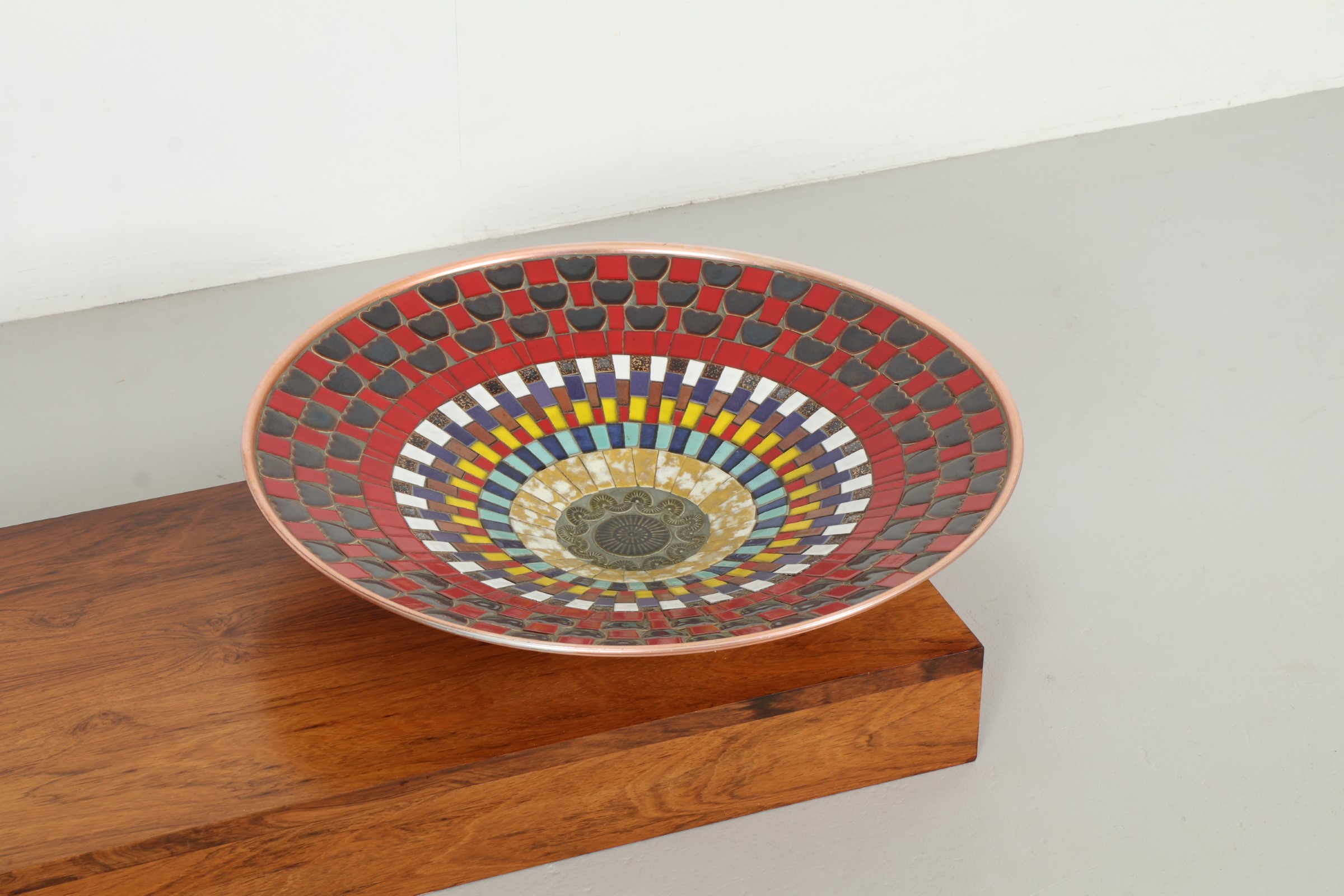
Large mosaic tile charger, 1960s.
570 mm DIA x 110 mm H

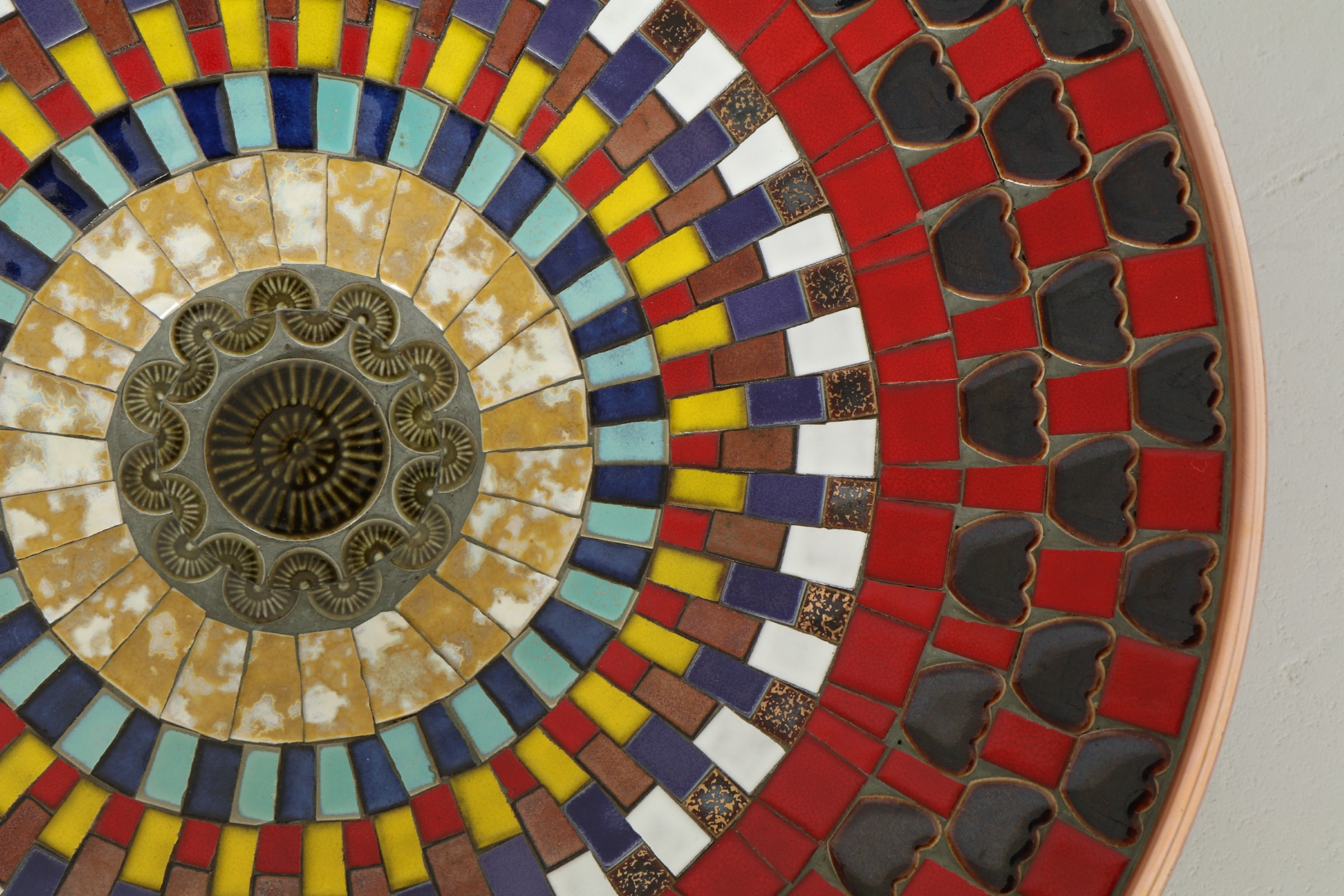
