= Architectural Designers New Zealand =

Professional association in New Zealand

- Formation: 1966
- Type: Professional body
- Location: Christchurch, New Zealand
- Region served: New Zealand
- Chief Executive Officer: Keryn Davis
- Key people: Susie Elms(Chair)
- Website: http://www.adnz.org.nz/

Architectural Designers New Zealand Incorporated (or ADNZ) is a professional body for architects and architectural designers in New Zealand.

ADNZ was established in 1966, as the Federation of Draughtsmen (FAD), in order to:

- Promote and advance architecture in New Zealand through the activities of the Society, its members and its educational activities
- Represent and promote the interests of members of the Society
- Promote high ethical standards of architectural design practice in New Zealand, including excellence in design and service to clients
- Form strategic alliances and contractual relationships with other organisations
- Engage in any professional or commercial activities which assist to regulate and promote architecture and associated industries in New Zealand.

ADNZ provides enhanced professional development options to members, and is vocal in advocating excellence in design.

The organisation holds an annual design awards – The ADNZ Resene Architectural Design Awards. The awards have been running for more than 25 years. The awards celebrate the best in architectural design, including residential and commercial architecture, throughout New Zealand.

ADNZ also produces an annual design publication, Defign, and a weekly blog with the same name.

ADNZ Head Office is located in Christchurch and the organisation supports nine regional branches across New Zealand.

== See also ==
- New Zealand Institute of Architects
