= New Zealand Society of Industrial Designers =

New Zealand professional organisation for designers

- New Zealand Society of Industrial Designers Incorporated
- Abbreviation: NZSID
- Predecessor: Design Guild
- Successor: Designers Institute of New Zealand (DINZ)
- Formation: 21 May 1959; 67 years ago
- Founders: Peter Parsons; John Crichton; Hugh Johansen; Jolyon Saunders; Robert Ellis; James Turkington; A. Thompson; T. Oldfield; Beck
- Founded at: Johansen Studio; 26a Albert Street, Auckland
- Dissolved: 11 August 2000; 26 years ago
- Type: Learned society
- Registration no.: 223468
- Legal status: Incorporated Society
- Headquarters: Auckland
- Location: New Zealand
- Region served: Regional groups • Northern (Auckland) • Central (Wellington) • Southern (Christchurch)
- Affiliations: ICSID (1965–76); Icograda

The New Zealand Society of Industrial Designers, known as NZSID, formed in 1959, was a professional body for designers in New Zealand. Its membership was multi-disciplinary, representing designers in all branches of design for industry—interior, product, furniture, graphic, packaging, exhibition, apparel, design education, design management... Incorporation, under the Incorporated Societies Act 1908, was granted on 27 September 1960. It was rebranded New Zealand Society of Designers (NZSD) and reconstituted on 28 May 1988 with a full-time office, the Designers Secretariat, from 1 August, and The Best New Zealand Graphic Design Awards scheme from 1 October.

The Society merged with the New Zealand Association of Interior Designers (NZAID) to form a new society, the Designers Institute of New Zealand (DINZ), in April 1991, which was incorporated on 23 August 1991. NZSID and NZAID were formally dissolved as incorporated societies on 11 August and 10 October 2000 respectively.

== Regional groups ==
Three regional groups (branches) were established on 18 February 1967—two in North Island, following the boundary of Auckland Province, and one in South Island:

- New Zealand Society of Industrial Designers, Northern Region (Auckland)
- New Zealand Society of Industrial Designers, Central Region (Wellington)
- New Zealand Society of Industrial Designers, Southern Region (Christchurch)

== Officers ==
=== Presidents ===
- 1959–1959: Hugh Johansen (Provisional Chairman)
- 1959–1960: Robert Ellis ONZM
- 1960–1962: Peter Parsons †
- 1962–1963: Paul Beadle
- 1963–1965: Keith Mosheim
- 1965–1969: Douglas Heath
- 1969–1971: Noel Tritton
- 1971–1973: Don Haynes
- 1973–1977: Keverne Trevelyan
- 1977–1981: Michael Smythe
- 1981–1984: Peter Haythornthwaite ONZM
- 1984–1986: Monica Schaer-Vance
- 1986–1988: Rudi Schwarz
- 1988–1992: Mark Adams

† Unconfirmed

=== Vice-presidents, councillors, secretaries and treasurers (A-Z) ===
Some members serving various terms, 1959–1992, with indication of office (VP, C, S, T):
Mark Adams (C), Maurice Askew (VP, C), Paul Beadle (VP, C), Jan Beck (C), A. J. Bisley (C), Frank Carpay (C), Mark Cleverly (C), James Coe QSO (VP, C), Kate Coolahan ONZM (C), John Crichton (C), Gary Couchman (C), K. Crook (C), John Densem (C), W. J. E. Dodds (C), Gray Dixon (C), Robert Drake (C, S), H. B. Ellis (C), B. Ellis (C), E. Fox (C), Hamish Keith CNZM OBE (C), Stephen Green, Peder Hansen (C, S), Don Hatcher (C), Don Haynes (VP, C, S, T), K. Hawkins (C), Max Hailstone (C), Peter Haythornthwaite ONZM (C, S), Douglas Heath (VP, C), Gifford Jackson ONZM (C), J. Laird (C), Don Little (C, S), Gerry Luhman (C), Clive Luscombe (C), M. J. Mason (C), Stan Mauger (C), Lindsay Missen (C), Keith Mosheim (VP), Geoff Nees (VP, C), Michael Penck (C), Peter Parsons (C, S), G. Percy (C), Mark Pennington ONZM (C), Ben Petts (C), G. Preston (C), Don Ramage (C), P. Richings (C), Jolyon Saunders (VP, C, S, T), Monica Schaer (C), Rudi Schwarz (C), Ann Shanks (C), Graham Simpson (C), Michael Smythe (C, S), Richard T. Te One (C), Ray Thorburn (C), Keverne Trevelyan (C), Noel Tritton (VP, C), Bill Tunnicliffe (C), Rowland Walsh (C), Elly van de Wijdeven (C), Erwin T. Winkler (C), Tony Winter (C, S), John Woodruffe (C, T), B. Yap (C), Edward J. Zagorski (C)

=== Executive Director, Designers Secretariat ===
- 1988–1992: Michael Smythe

== Publications ==
- Jackson, Gifford (1972). The Industrial Designer in Practice. Auckland: New Zealand Society of Industrial Designers Incorporated.
- SID Scene (1970–). Nos. 1–. Christchurch: New Zealand Society of Industrial Designers Inc.; Designprint Press Ltd. Bi-monthly membership newsletter.
- Designz (November 1973–November December 1985). Original series nos. 1–39. Auckland: New Zealand Society of Industrial Designers Inc. – via Auckland Libraries; Christchurch City Libraries; National Library of New Zealand.
- Designz: Magazine of the New Zealand Society of Designers Inc. (September 1988–December 1990). New series nos. 1–7. New Zealand Society of Designers Inc. ISSN: 1170-6686 – via Auckland Libraries; Christchurch City Libraries; National Library of New Zealand.
- DESIGNERS secretariat: The New Zealand Society of Designers Incorporated (prospectus), Auckland: New Zealand Society of Designers, 1988
- New Zealand Society of Designers (1988). 'The Best' New Zealand Graphic Design Awards. Auckland: Artspec – via Auckland Libraries.
