= Better by Design =

Better by Design is a business improvement programme operated by New Zealand Trade and Enterprise. The programme works with New Zealand companies to help them use design as part of their business.

== Origins of the programme ==
In 2003 a government taskforce, including designers, academics and business people, developed a report called Success by Design, which recommended ways New Zealand businesses could become more innovative. In 2004 a Better by Design team was established within NZTE to deliver the recommended programme to export-focused businesses and the design community. The programme was initially allocated $12.5 million over four years. An initial target was set to have 50 existing businesses made more internationally competitive through design, and generating an additional $500 million in annual export earnings. The programme was extended in the 2008 government budget announcement.

== Research and reactions to the programme ==
There have been a number of commissioned research reports and that served as input or responses to the 2003 taskforce report. Including research into the role of design in the furniture industry, research on the importance of design in business leadership and the role of government in supporting design.

The Better by Design programme has been compared to other government assistance for design and innovation. Better by Design has been included in a number of benchmarking and comparison projects to assess the impact of government intervention in innovation. The programme is also sometimes referred to when benchmarking New Zealand's international competitiveness in innovation.

== Operations ==
The core of the programme is a privately delivered and publicly funded consulting project focussed on branding, product design and business strategy. Providers of services to the programme have included PWC, Deloitte, DesignWorks and other New Zealand design firms. Current providers of services include the Equip Design Group, BRR and PHD3 Design.

== CEO Summit ==
The Better by Design programme also runs a periodic conference called the Better by Design CEO Summit. The conference has been held in 2005, 2008, 2010, and 2011. The conferences have attracted between 150 and 200 attendees, with approximately 200 attending in 2010.
