= Design Guild =

New Zealand professional organisation for designers

- Auckland Design Guild
- Successor: New Zealand Society of Industrial Designers (NZSID)
- Formation: June 1949; 77 years ago
- Founded at: Auckland
- Dissolved: 1949
- Type: Learned society
- Location: Auckland, New Zealand
- Members: 200 (1949)
- Chairman: Alan Rigby (Architect)

The Design Guild, also known as the Auckland Design Guild, formed in Auckland in June 1949 for the promotion of good design, was a short-lived professional body for designers in New Zealand.

== Background ==
The Guild emerged just over a year after the publication of New Zealand Design Review in Wellington in April 1948, and soon after the New Zealand lecture tour of industrial designer and president of the Society of Industrial Artists (SIA) in Britain, Milner Gray, in April 1949, arranged by the British Council in Australia and New Zealand.

Gray's lecture, The Industrial Design Profession in Great Britain, touched on the design organisations there. Amongst these, the most complete effort to organise the profession had been that of the Society of Industrial Artists formed in 1930, "to establish for designers a status comparable with that of the architect and the engineer." And on that path, "in 1936 the Royal Society of Arts singled out a limited number of designers of high eminence and bestowed on them a diploma carrying the right to use the affix R.D.I. (Royal Designer for Industry). This is often called 'the blue ribbon' of the profession…" Several New Zealanders in Britain had attained Royal Designer for Industry status—Keith Murray amongst the first in 1936 and Brian O'Rorke in 1939.

At the Guild's inaugural luncheon in Auckland in June 1949, Cyril Knight, Dean of the Faculty of Architecture at Auckland University College, affirmed that: "The Guild is an organisation formed to bring together designers in various fields and to publicise good design." He reminded some 200 present members that: "This country is full of shoddy goods, shoddy houses, shoddy cities and the implements we use, the very tools of trade, are shoddy too," created on the excuse that they will "do the job". In pursuit of "gracious living", he concluded: "Thus it may be said that in activities large and small there is room for good design and reason too, for a forum to talk about it, to demonstrate and explain how the pattern of life based upon good design can offer great happiness to mankind."

The Free Lance, 27 July 1949, also observed that:

… numbers of returned servicemen members who, having seen something of fine architecture and design during overseas service, now feel the lack of these things in their own country. They are keen to support any movement which will help the Dominion to demand and attain a higher standard.

The work of a number of members was presented in a private four-day "get-together" exhibition for designers of all types, on the first floor of Edson's Building, 270 Queen Street, in August. The chairman, architect Alan Rigby, explained: "As New Zealanders we can make many things that suit New Zealand better than things made in London or New York", and "Getting together like this helps us find the common approach we need." Then, responding to public demand, the Guild opened it to the public. Rigby responded: "We were amazed. People kept calling us up asking if they could bring a dozen guests along." Amongst the exhibitors, Gifford Jackson, a design draughtsman at Fisher & Paykel, had designed washing machine components, brand logos and commercial refrigeration equipment, as well as appliance store and milk bar layouts before joining D. J. Davis Ltd to design photographic equipment. Jackson's freelance projects included an anchor and toys. Typography was represented by Robert Lowry and Ronald Holloway. Clifton Firth combined commercial art and photography. Monthly meetings at the Guild's two-storied suite of rooms, lectures, public exhibitions and articles in a proposed co-sponsored Design Review magazine were to follow.

The Design Guild, however, didn't last the year. Peter Parsons later commented: "With the best intentions in the world the movement was too theoretical. For instance considerable time was devoted to ruling out any commercial aspect to an exhibition of members' work. Four members resigned and formed a partnership of designers and Jackson left New Zealand to become quite a successful industrial designer on his own account in New York." If there was another lesson, it left some participants aware of the effect of meteoric public relations, and subsequent falls.

Design organisations emerged in following years—Visual Arts Association (VAA) in Dunedin in 1952, the Design Association of New Zealand (DANZ) in Christchurch in 1959, and New Zealand Society of Industrial Designers (NZSID) in Auckland in 1959.
