= Bridge of Remembrance =

War memorial in Christchurch, New Zealand

- New Zealand
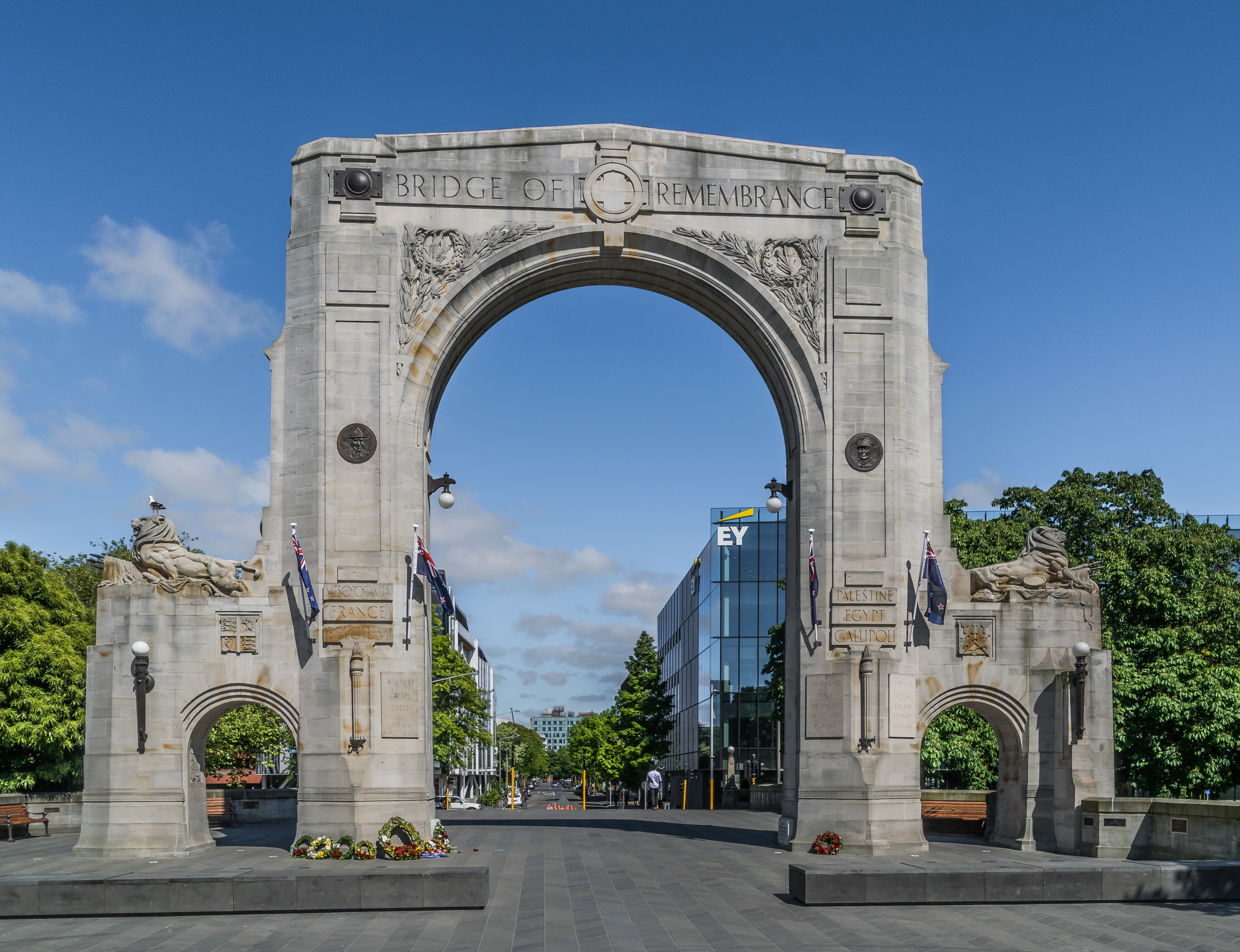
- Bridge of Remembrance, 2017
- For New Zealand dead of World War I New Zealand dead of World War II
- Unveiled: 11 November 1924
- Location: 43°31′59″S 172°38′00″E
- Designed by: William Gummer (architect); Frederick Gurnsey (stonemason)
- Latin: Quid non-pro patria

Heritage New Zealand – Category 1
- Designated: 2 April 1985
- Reference no.: 289

The Bridge of Remembrance is one of two main war memorials in Christchurch, New Zealand. It is dedicated to those who died in World War I, and serves as a memorial for those who participated in two World Wars as well as subsequent conflicts in Borneo, Korea, Malaya, and Vietnam. Owned by Christchurch City Council, it is located on the Cashel Street Bridge at the head of City Mall. The Bridge of Remembrance was repaired and strengthened following the 2011 Christchurch earthquake and was reopened with a rededication ceremony held on Anzac Day in 2016.

== Geography ==
The archway was built over the east end of the Cashel Street bridge that links Oxford and Cambridge Terraces over the Avon River / Ōtākaro. It became a pedestrian precinct on Anzac Day (25 April) in 1977. East of it is the business district and the main pedestrian mall. In the area between the bridge and Victoria Square are the Floral Clock, Law Courts, Canterbury Provincial Council Buildings, Our City and the Scott Statue.

== History ==
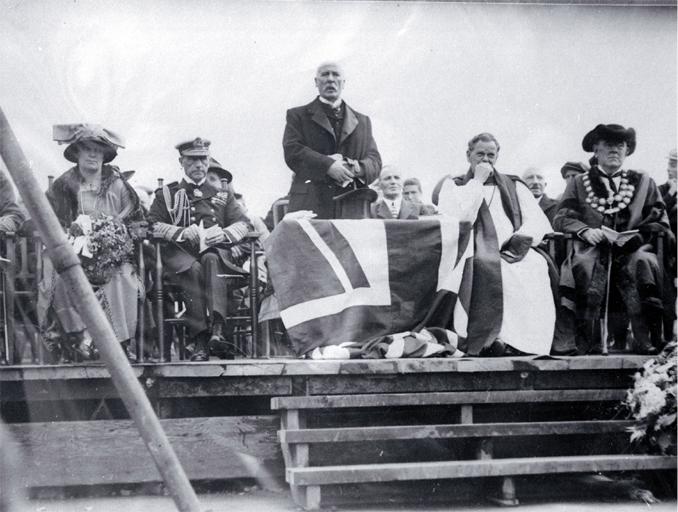
Dignitaries at the opening (from left): Lady Jellicoe, Governor-General Viscount Jellicoe, Andrew Anderson, Bishop Churchill Julius and Mayor Henry Thacker

Edward George Wright, a civil engineer and contractor, won the contract of building a bridge over the Avon River at Cashel Street and completed the work in May 1873. Wright was paid £509 for his work, but there was in addition a separate tender for work on the approaches.

The idea of building a memorial arch on top of the existing bridge, a "Bridge of Remembrance", was first raised in a letter to The Press on 24 July 1919, written by Mrs Wyn Irwin. The suggestion found support from the public. Construction began on 23 January 1923. The cornerstone was laid by Lord Jellicoe, Governor-General and Admiral of the Fleet on Anzac Day, 25 April 1923, when the religious blessing was invoked by Archbishop Churchill Julius.

The memorial was unveiled on 11 November 1924, Armistice Day, by Lord Jellicoe. From King Edward Barracks further west on Cashel Street, soldiers crossed the Avon River at this location, marching off to the railway station in Moorhouse Avenue to fight in three wars. Stage 1 of the bridge's refurbishment occurred in 1989, Stage 2 began two years later, being completed in 1992 with a commemorative plaque dedication ceremony held on 21 June.

The bridge was closed to motorised traffic in 1976, several years prior to the adjacent Cashel Street's closure to vehicular traffic (on 11 January 1982).

In February 2011, it was targeted by vandals who sprayed it with graffiti. Only a fortnight later, the February 2011 Christchurch earthquake struck, damaging the arch. Permanent repair and earthquake strengthening were estimated to cost over NZ$2m. Christchurch City Council initially considered placing a temporary steel structure around the arch, but, at $430,000, have since dismissed this idea as being too expensive. The Returned Services' Association expressed dismay at the decision to not go ahead with the temporary work, citing fears of losing the heritage structure altogether in another strong aftershock, in just the same way as happened to the Lyttelton Timeball Station in the June aftershock. The Bridge of Remembrance repairs earthquake strengthening started in May 2013, with hopes of repairs being partially completed to commemorate the 100th anniversary of World War I in August 2014 and being fully completed in time to commemorate Anzac Day 2015. Those timelines were not met and whilst structural repairs were completed by December 2015 for $6.7m, the Bridge of Remembrance re-opened to the public and rededicated on Anzac Day, Monday 25 April 2016.

== Design ==
The architectural design competition was won by the firm Prouse and Gummer, with William Gummer undertaking the design work. Gummer also designed several other notable New Zealand memorials, notably the Dunedin Cenotaph. The arch's central frame includes the inscription Quid non-pro patria ("What [will a man] not [do] for [his] country[?]"). There are several unit memorials, and a plaque to Charles Upham. The arch style bridge is ornamented. Symbolic features of the memorial include a cross, torches, coat of arms, laurel wreaths, Latin inscription, fascines and rosemary decoration. There are also decorative lions that were carved by Frederick Gurnsey (1868–1953).

== Heritage listing ==
On 2 April 1985, the Bridge of Remembrance was registered as a Category I heritage structure with the New Zealand Historic Places Trust, with registration number 289.
