= First Church of Christ Scientist, Christchurch =

Church in Christchurch, New Zealand

First Church of Christ Scientist
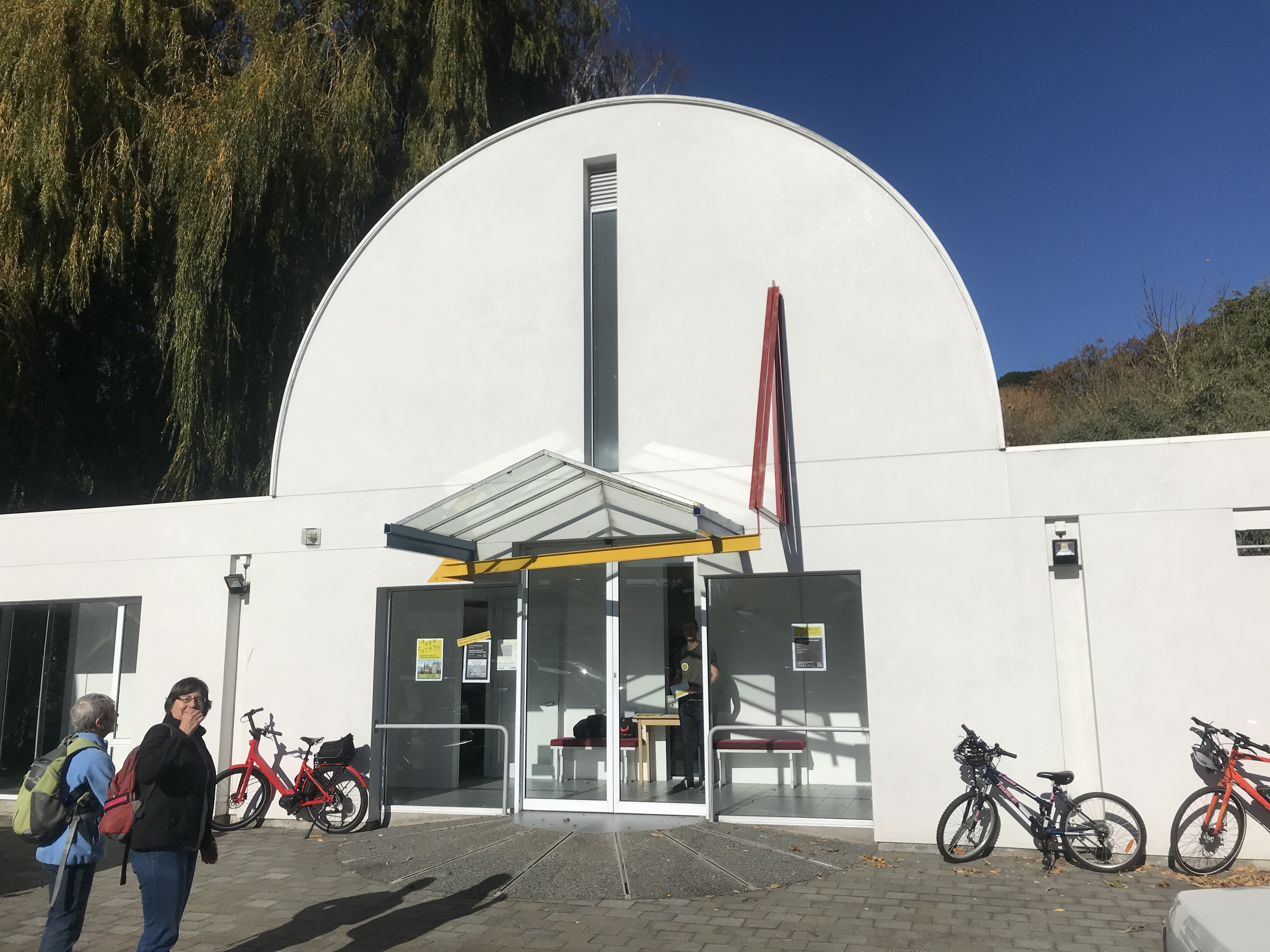
- Church Exterior
- Interactive map of the First Church of Christ Scientist area

General information
- Type: Church
- Architectural style: Post Modernism
- Location: 66 Carlton Mill Road, Merivale, Christchurch, New Zealand
- Construction started: 1991

Design and construction
- Architect: Warren & Mahoney

The First Church of Christ Scientist, Christchurch is a Christian Science Church located in Christchurch, New Zealand known for its postmodern architectural style.

== History ==
The First Church of Christ, Scientist was located on Worcester Street, Christchurch from 1935 to 1984. Designed by local architect Heathcote Helmore, the original church was a neoclassical style temple building with a reinforced concrete and brick construction. The church could accommodate 240 patrons and included an area below the auditorium for Sunday school pupils.

The church remained until 1984 when it was purchased by Toi Yee Chan and was converted into a restaurant.

== Current facilities ==
The new church was built in 1991 by Warren & Mahoney in their new location. It was designed in the postmodern style with references to classical architecture, modernism, and abstract art.

The main auditorium hall alludes to the Pantheon with a coffered barrel-vaulted ceiling. The exterior contains elements of Mondrian style colourful and geometric details. A replica of Mondrian's painting can be found on the interior wall of the main auditorium. Mackintosh style chairs were also designed for the main alter area. A reading room and Sunday school area is connected to the main auditorium and have similar barrel vaulted ceilings and windows.

The building was awarded a National Enduring Architecture Award by the NZIA in 2022.

The church is one of the few remaining examples of postmodern buildings in Christchurch, with many others destroyed in the 2011 earthquake.

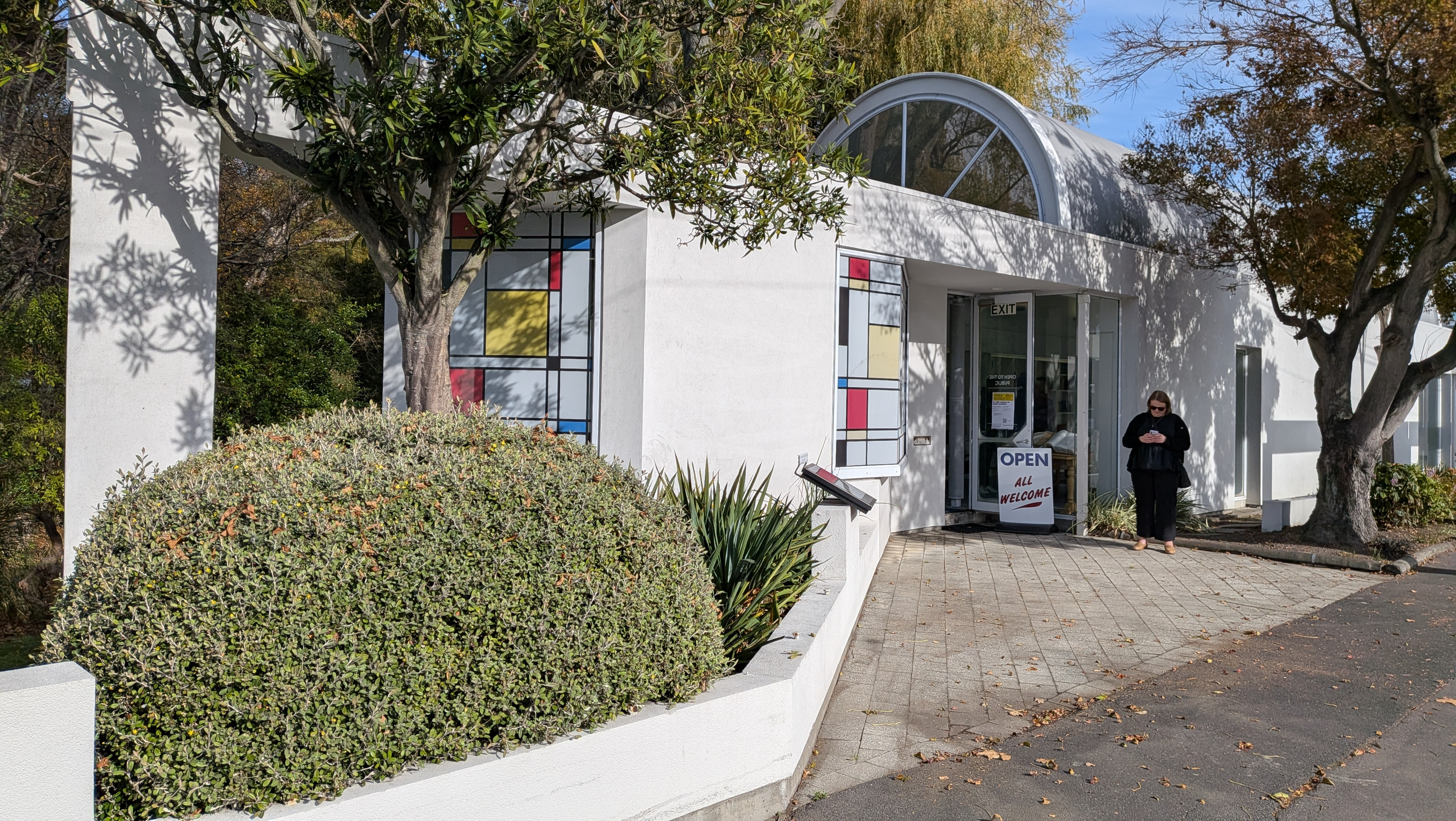
Reading room entrance

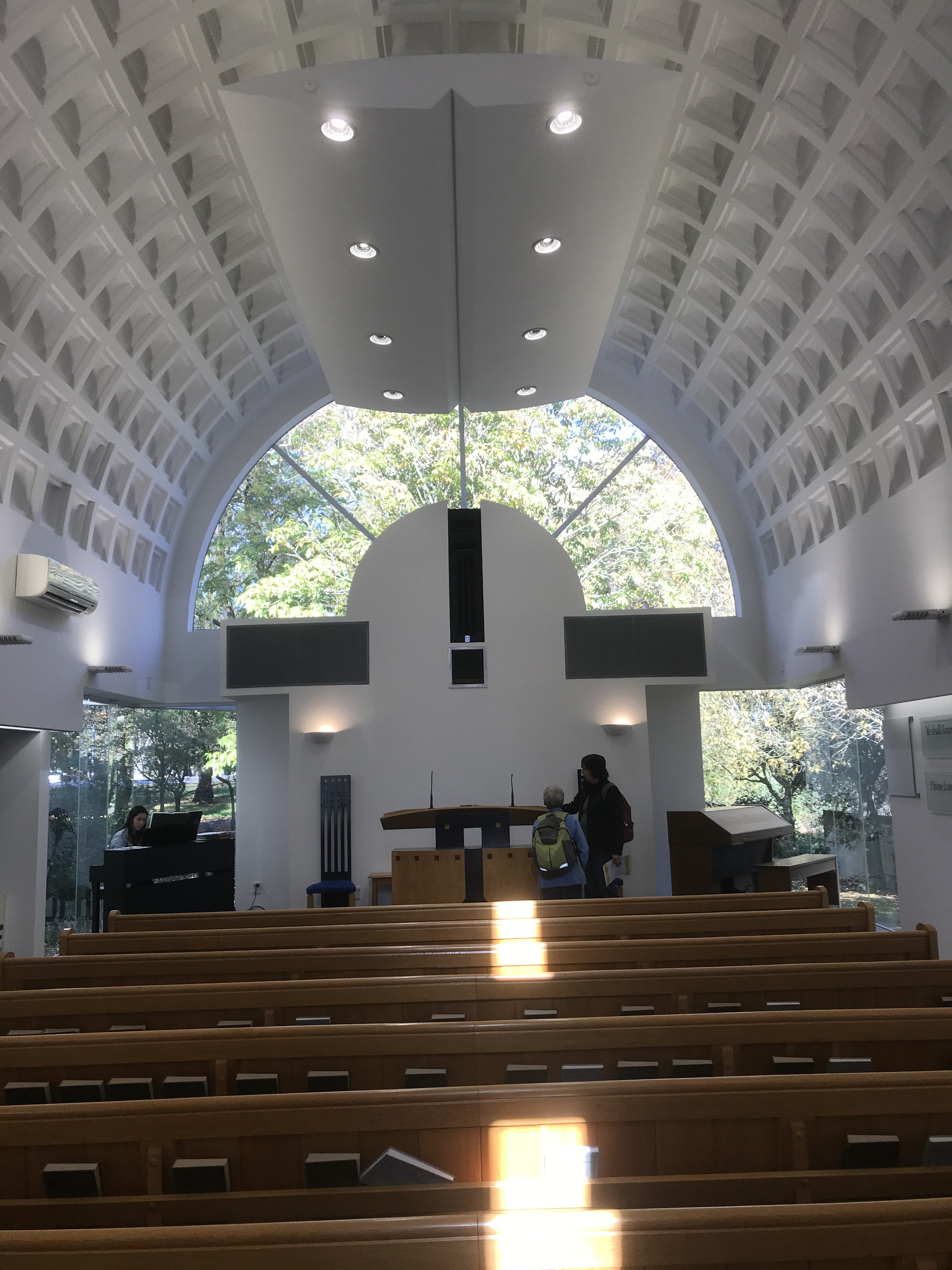
Main auditorium interior

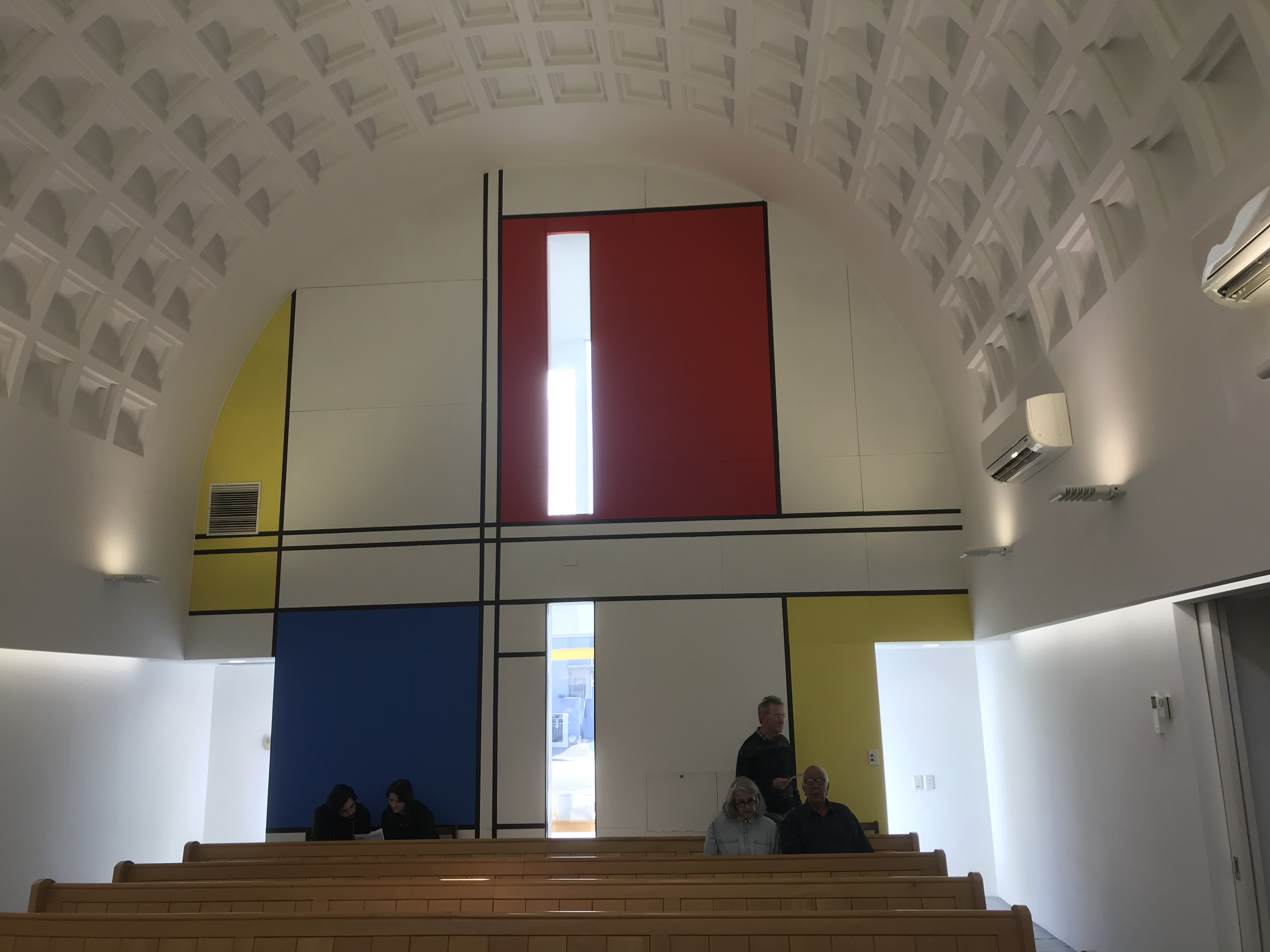
Mondrian style murial in the main auditorium

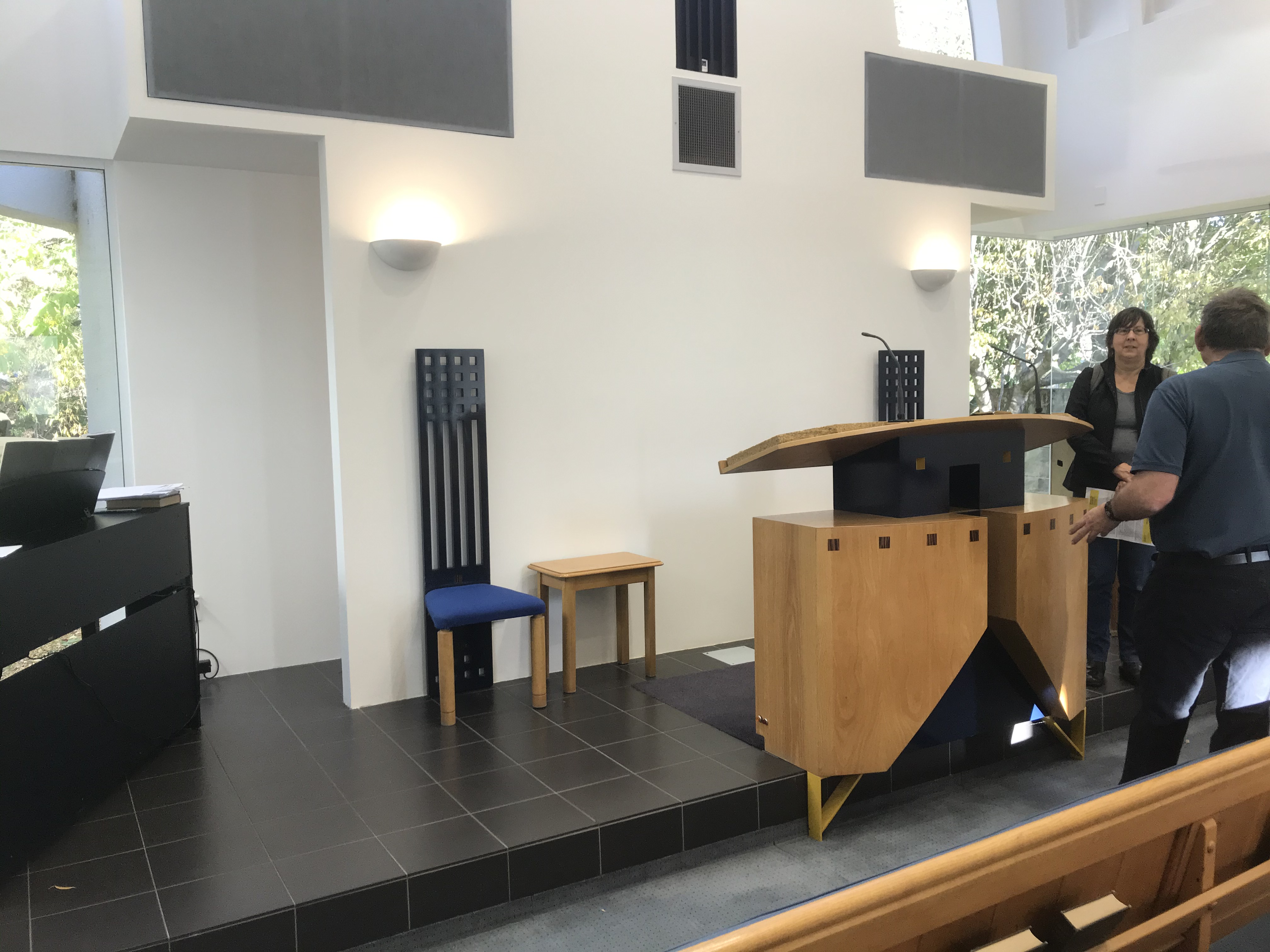
Mackintosh style chairs on the alter

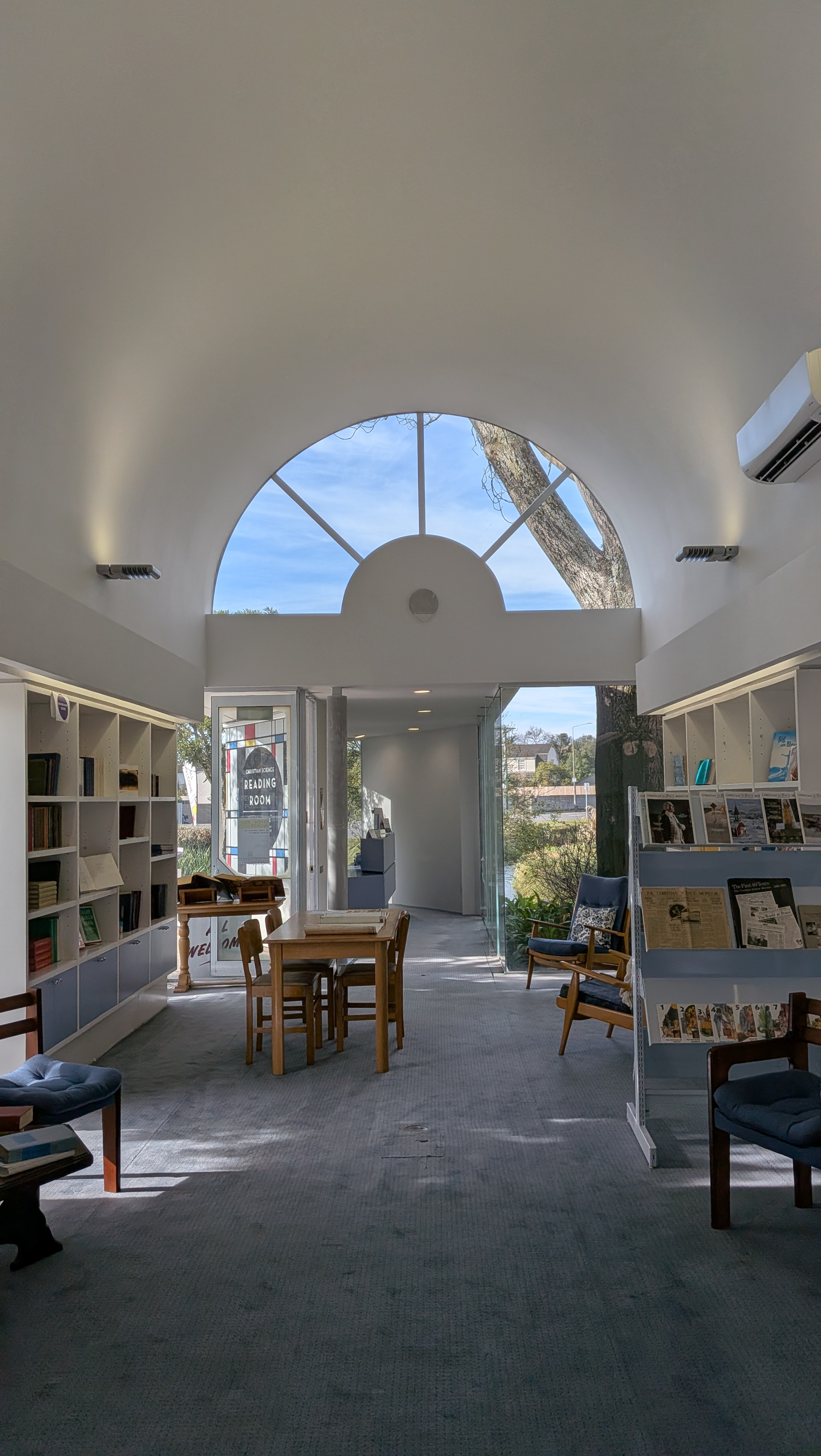
Reading room interior
