= Hoggard, Prouse and Gummer =

Former New Zealand architectural firm

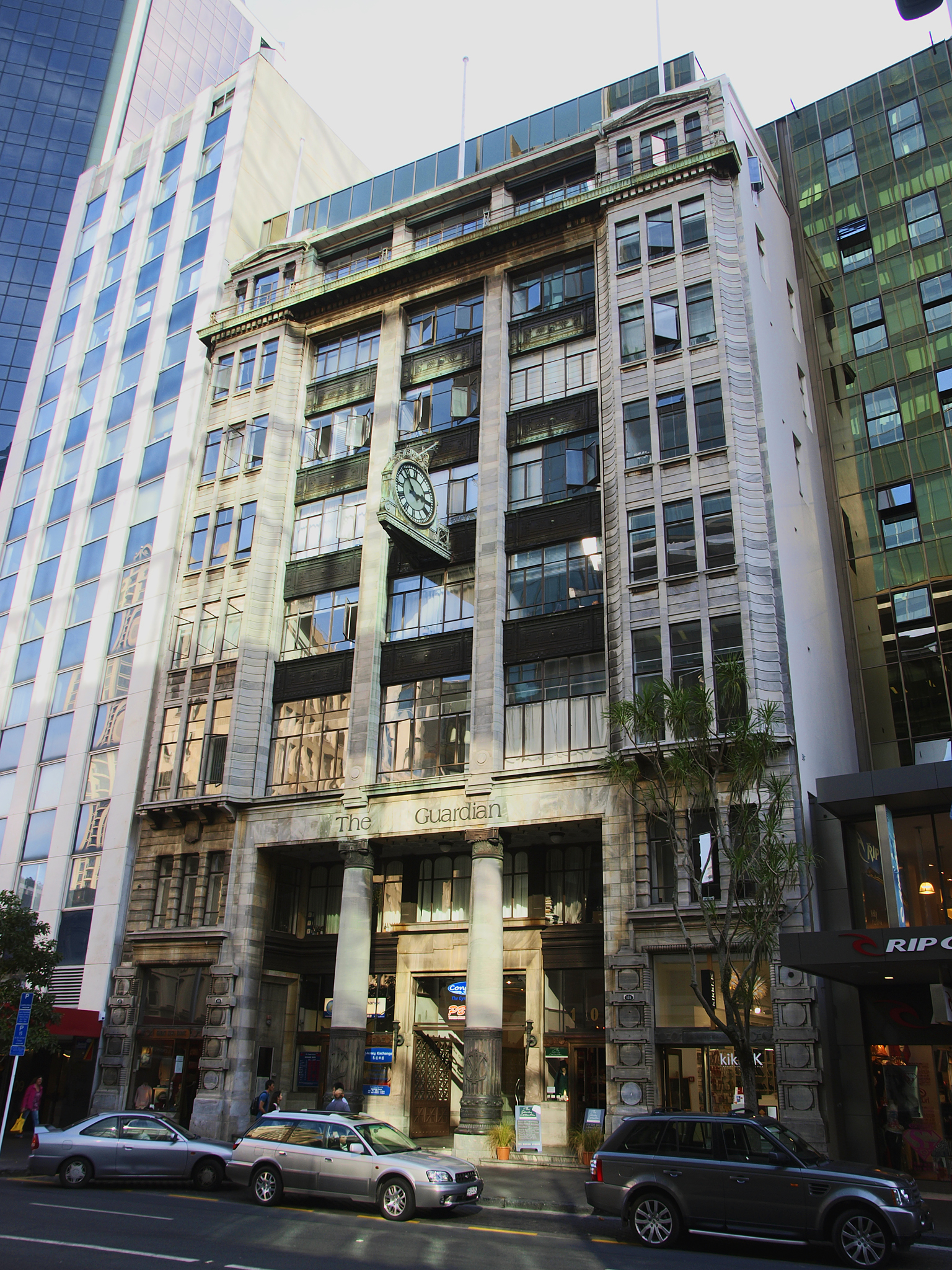
New Zealand Guardian Trust Building

Hoggard, Prouse and Gummer was an architectural firm that operated between 1913 and 1921 in Wellington, New Zealand. The partners were John Hoggard, William Prouse and William Henry Gummer.

John F ('Jack') Hoggard trained as an architect under his uncle William Chatfield and later under Joshua Charlesworth. He visited the United States and on his return to New Zealand applied some of the new ideas he had encountered, for example suspended verandahs on shop fronts. Hoggard formed a partnership with William J Prouse in 1907, and in 1913 William Henry Gummer became the third partner in the firm. Hoggard left the partnership in 1921, and Gummer left the firm (by now called Prouse and Gummer) in 1923.

Notable buildings designed by the company include the New Zealand Insurance Building (1914), later known as the Guardian Trust Building, in Auckland on Queen Street, the Grand Theatre in Manners Street, Wellington (1914), the Winter Garden at the Domain in Auckland (1916), the YWCA building in Auckland (1916) and the State Fire Insurance Building (1919), Wellington. The firm partnered with the Public Works Department to design the rotunda wards at Queen Mary Hospital in Hanmer Springs (1916) and the King George V Military Hospital for Convalescent Patients in Rotorua (1916).
