= Canterbury Pioneer Women's Memorial =

New Zealand memorial

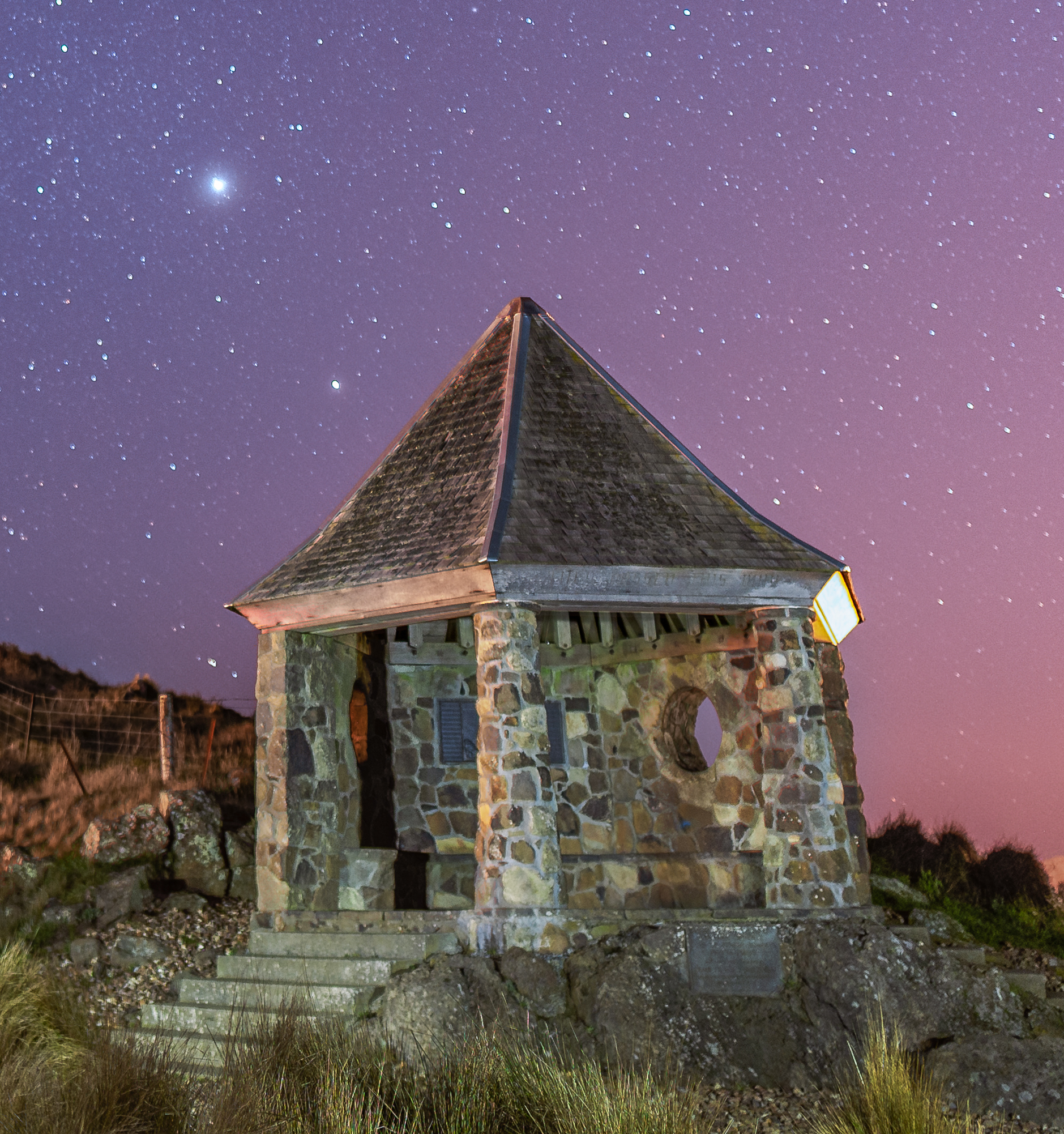
- The memorial in 2020
- Interactive map of Canterbury Pioneer Women's Memorial
- Location: Bridle Path, Port Hills, Christchurch
- Coordinates: 43°35′36.8″S 172°42′29.3″E
- Designer: Heathcote Helmore (structure); Frederick Gurnsey (mural)
- Opening date: 14 December 1940
- Dedicated to: Women pioneers of Canterbury
- Alternate name: Pioneer Women's Memorial

The Canterbury Pioneer Women's Memorial commemorates the pioneer women of Canterbury in New Zealand. After arrival by sea in Lyttelton Harbour, early settlers had to cross the Port Hills via the Bridle Path to reach Christchurch or the Canterbury Plains. The memorial was unveiled at the summit of the Bridle Path in 1940, 90 years after the First Four Ships had arrived in Lyttelton. The impetus for having a memorial was for Christchurch to have a contribution for the New Zealand centennial commemorating the signing of the Treaty of Waitangi in 1840. Hence, the Canterbury Pioneer Women's Memorial commemorates two events that happened ten years apart.

== Background ==
The First Four Ships refers to the four sailing vessels chartered by the Canterbury Association that left Plymouth, England, in September 1850 to transport the first English settlers to new homes in Canterbury, New Zealand. The first two of the ships, the Charlotte Jane and the Randolph, both arrived on 16 December 1850 and this is regarded as the beginning of organised settlement for Canterbury.

== History of the memorial ==
The women's branch of the Christchurch Citizens' Association had been in abeyance for some years. When the women's branch reformed in November 1938, committee member Mildred Trent proposed a memorial to Canterbury's pioneer women at their first meeting. She suggested that this would be a good project for New Zealand's centenary of the signing of the Treaty of Waitangi in 1840. Trent pointed out that women in the other main centres of Wellington, Auckland, and Dunedin had already formed committees for the establishment of centenary memorials. Trent's idea for the memorial was to provide a sheltered seat at the summit of the Bridal Path where it crosses the Summit Road.

A sub-committee of women approached the Canterbury Progress League in early December 1938 and presented the idea of the women's pioneer memorial. The Canterbury Progress League welcomed the proposal and cancelled its own ideas for a memorial, giving their full support to the women's branch.

By March 1939, the plans had progressed. An architect, Heathcote Helmore, had offered his service pro bono and designed a hexagonal stone shelter using local stone. The design elements envisaged were an inscription "The Pilgrims passed this way" and murals depicting scenes from the 1850s. The structure was proposed to be placed on the boundary shared by the Heathcote and Lyttelton boroughs, and both borough councils had expressed their support. John Flinders Scott was the local landowner and he also supported the proposal.

== Construction ==
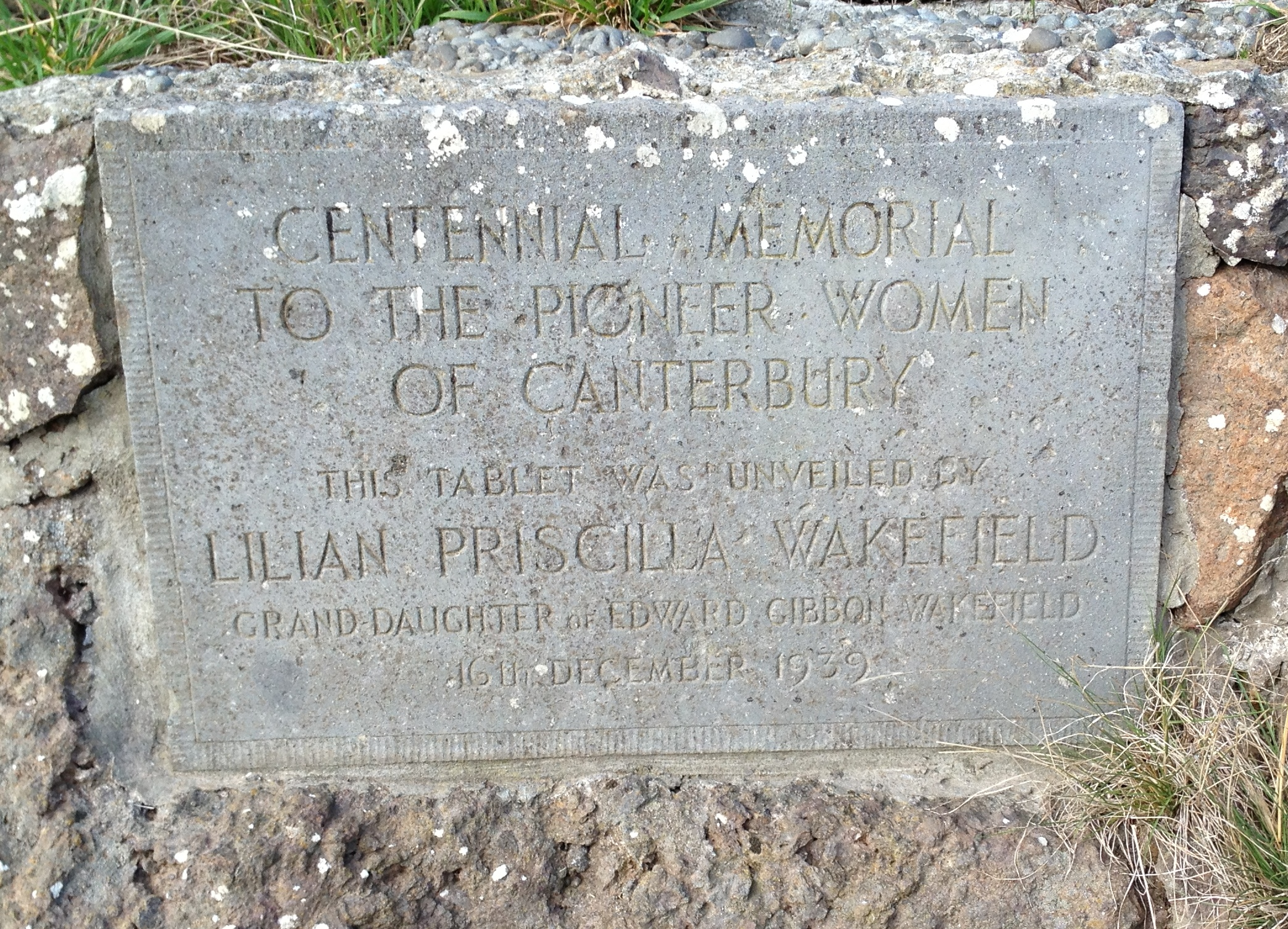
1939 foundation stone

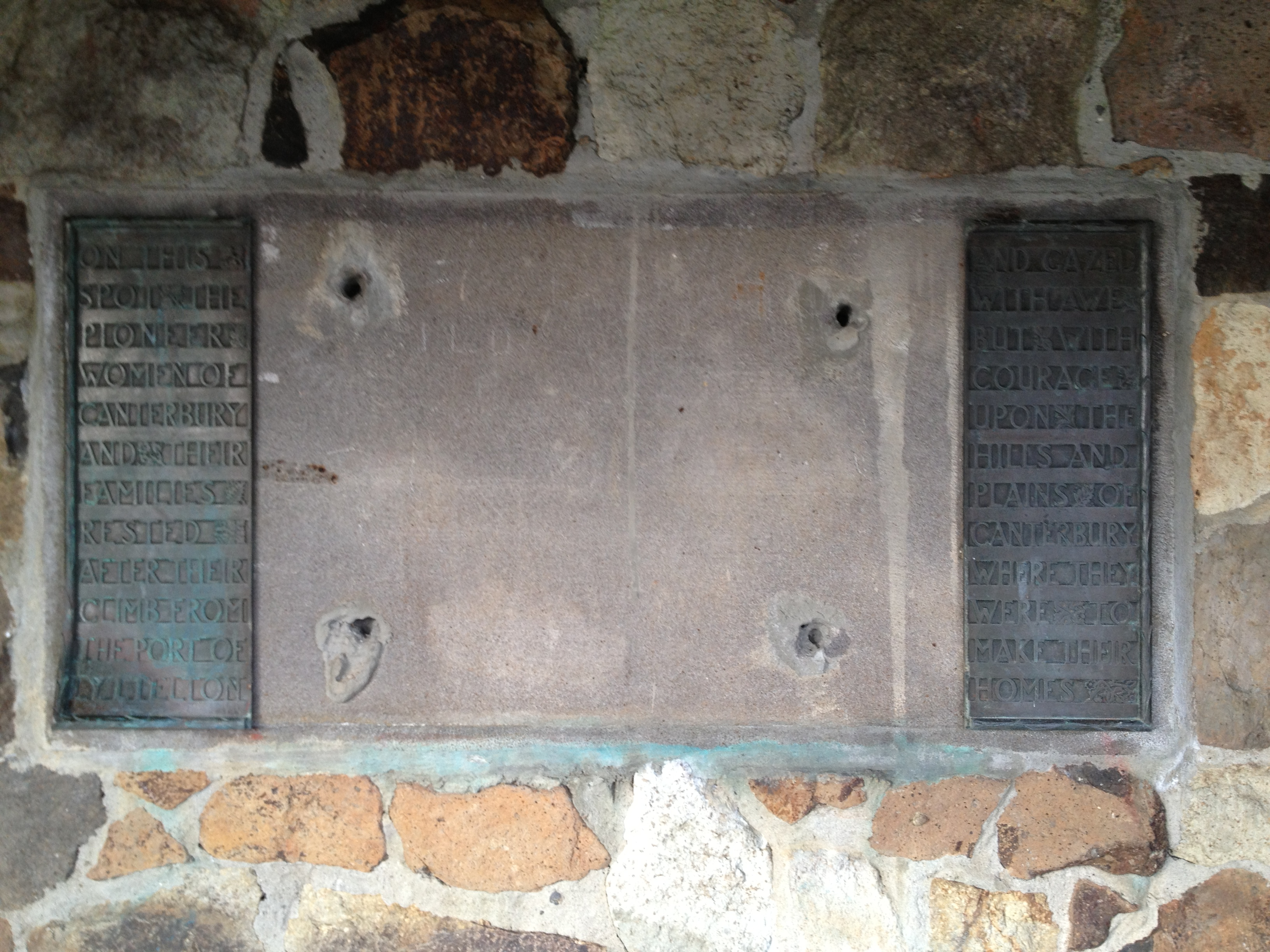
Frederick Gurnsey's mural after the middle plate had been stolen

The foundation stone was unveiled on 16 December 1939 by Lilian Priscilla Wakefield. Wakefield was the daughter of Jerningham Wakefield and granddaughter of Edward Gibbon Wakefield; her grandfather was the person who had spearheaded the settlement of Canterbury through the Canterbury Association. At that time, three of the Pilgrims were still alive and two of them attended the unveiling of the foundation stone. Frederick George Brittan was one of them, the son of Guise Brittan, and Richard Evans was the other Pilgrim in attendance. More than 1,000 people attended the unveiling of the foundation stone, with the house flag of the Charlotte Jane used to cover the stone. A party of 50 people walked up from the Lyttelton side, led by mayor Frederick Ernest Sutton.

The inscription on the foundation stone reads:

Centennial memorial
to the pioneer women
of Canterbury
This tablet was unveiled by
Lilian Priscilla Wakefield
granddaughter of Edward Gibbon Wakefield
16th December, 1939

The formal opening of the Canterbury Pioneer Women's Memorial was held one year later on 14 December 1940. With the 90th anniversary of the arrival of the first two ships falling on a Monday, the ceremony was held two days earlier so that people could attend. Travel was with 11 buses and nearly 100 cars. The army band of the 1st Battalion, Canterbury Regiment, provided the music. Four women spoke, all descendants of one of the Pilgrims from the First Four ships:

- Charlotte Jane: Lilian Bowen, daughter of the politician Charles Bowen
- Randolph: Mary Duncan, daughter of the farmer George Duncan
- Sir George Seymour: Mrs H. C. Hewland, daughter of the priest Henry Jacobs
- Cressy: Mrs B. M. Field, granddaughter of archdeacon Benjamin Dudley

The inscription on the memorial had been simplified to "They passed this way". The cone-shaped roof of the memorial was made from slate. The structure was erected by Graham builders. Frederick Gurnsey produced a mural depicting a family carrying their possessions over the Port Hills. The bronze panel is in three parts, with the two outer panels showing the text and the middle panel showing the mural. Whilst Gurnsey is a noted carver, the mural at the Canterbury Pioneer Women's Memorial is not regarded as a success. The inscription on the mural reads:

On this spot the pioneer women of Canterbury and their families rested after their climb from the port of Lyttelton
and gazed with awe but with courage upon the hills and plains of Canterbury where they were to make their home

The memorial was debt-free when it opened. The memorial committee spent around £NZ600 on the initiative and achieved a surplus from their fundraising and handed the remaining funds to the Christchurch City Council for beautification around the memorial.

== Subsequent history ==
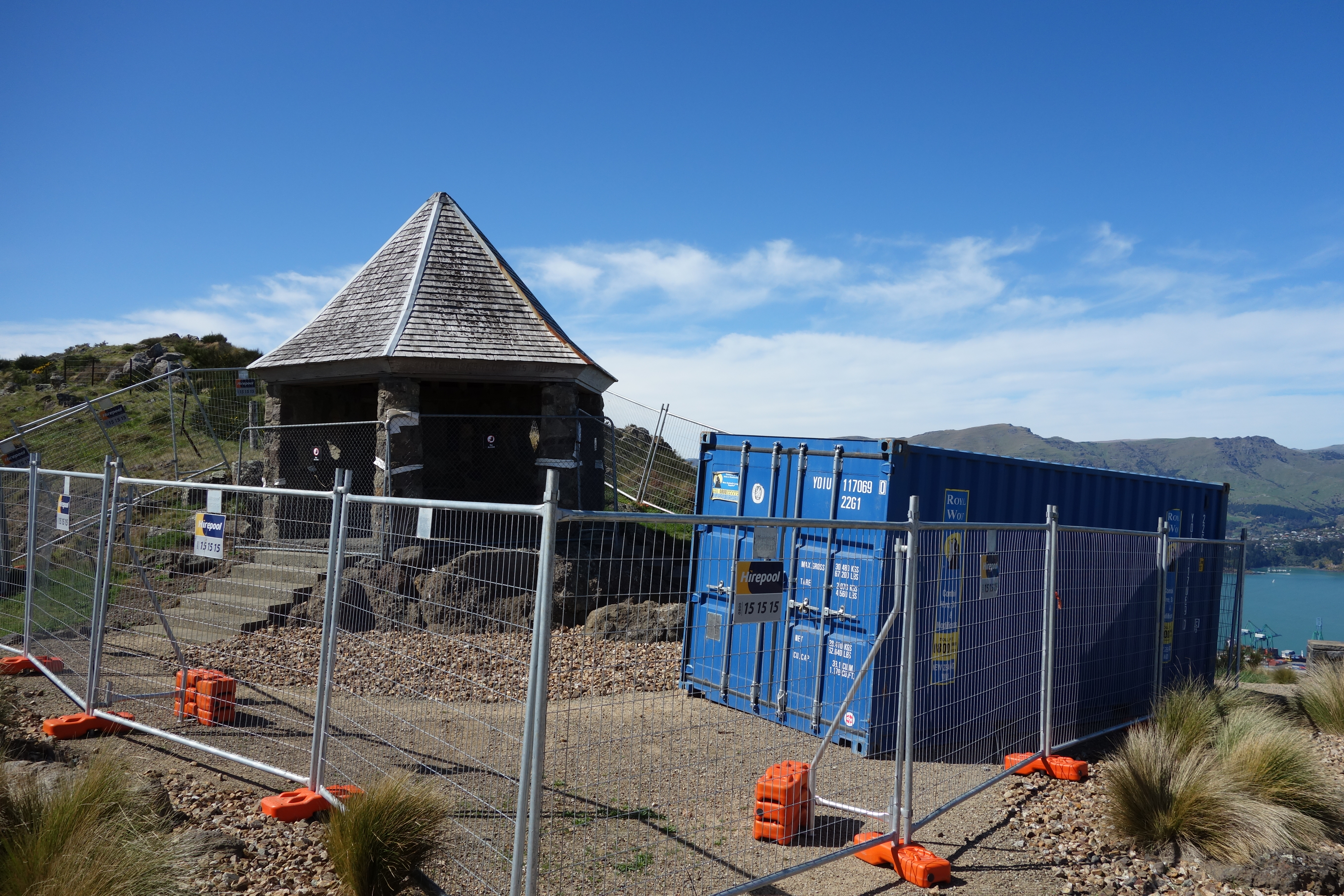
Memorial fenced off for earthquake repairs

On 4 April 2001, the Bridle Path Historic Area was entered as an historic area by the New Zealand Historic Places Trust (now Heritage New Zealand). The Canterbury Pioneer Women's Memorial is included in that historic area.

The memorial was damaged by the 2011 Christchurch earthquake and was fenced off for many years. During this time, the middle panel of Gurnsey's mural was stolen. The memorial was reopened in April 2017 prior to the stolen mural having been replaced.

== Location and access ==
The Canterbury Pioneer Women's Memorial is located at the top of the Bridle Path and adjacent to the Summit Road. Access is via the Bridle Path (walking or mountain biking) or via the top station of the nearby Christchurch Gondola. The central part of the Summit Road has been closed to motorised traffic since the 2011 Christchurch earthquake.
