= Bridle Path (New Zealand) =

Historic road in New Zealand

Coordinates: 43.593344°S 172.707940°E

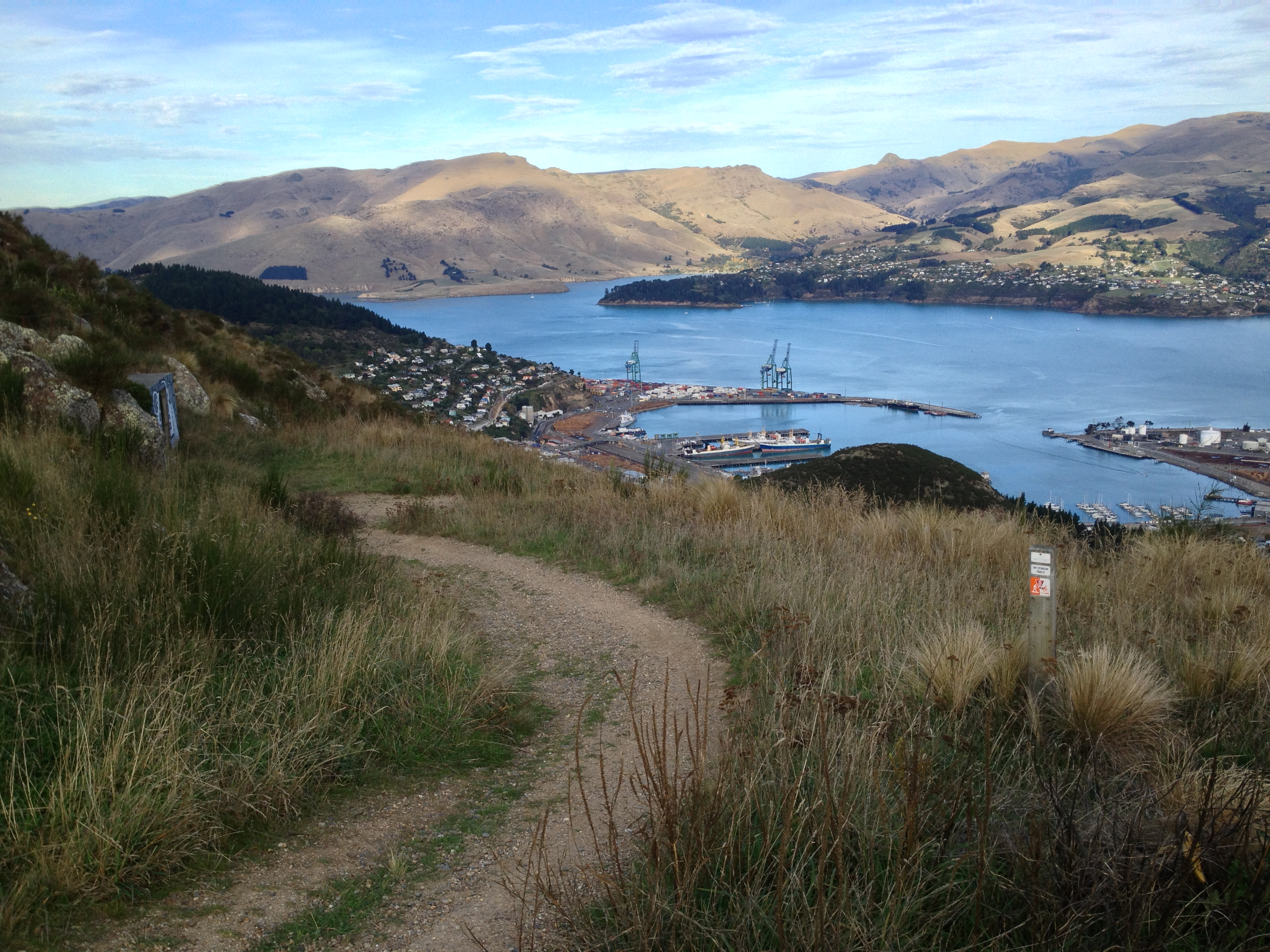
Looking down to Lyttelton Harbour from the top of Bridle Path

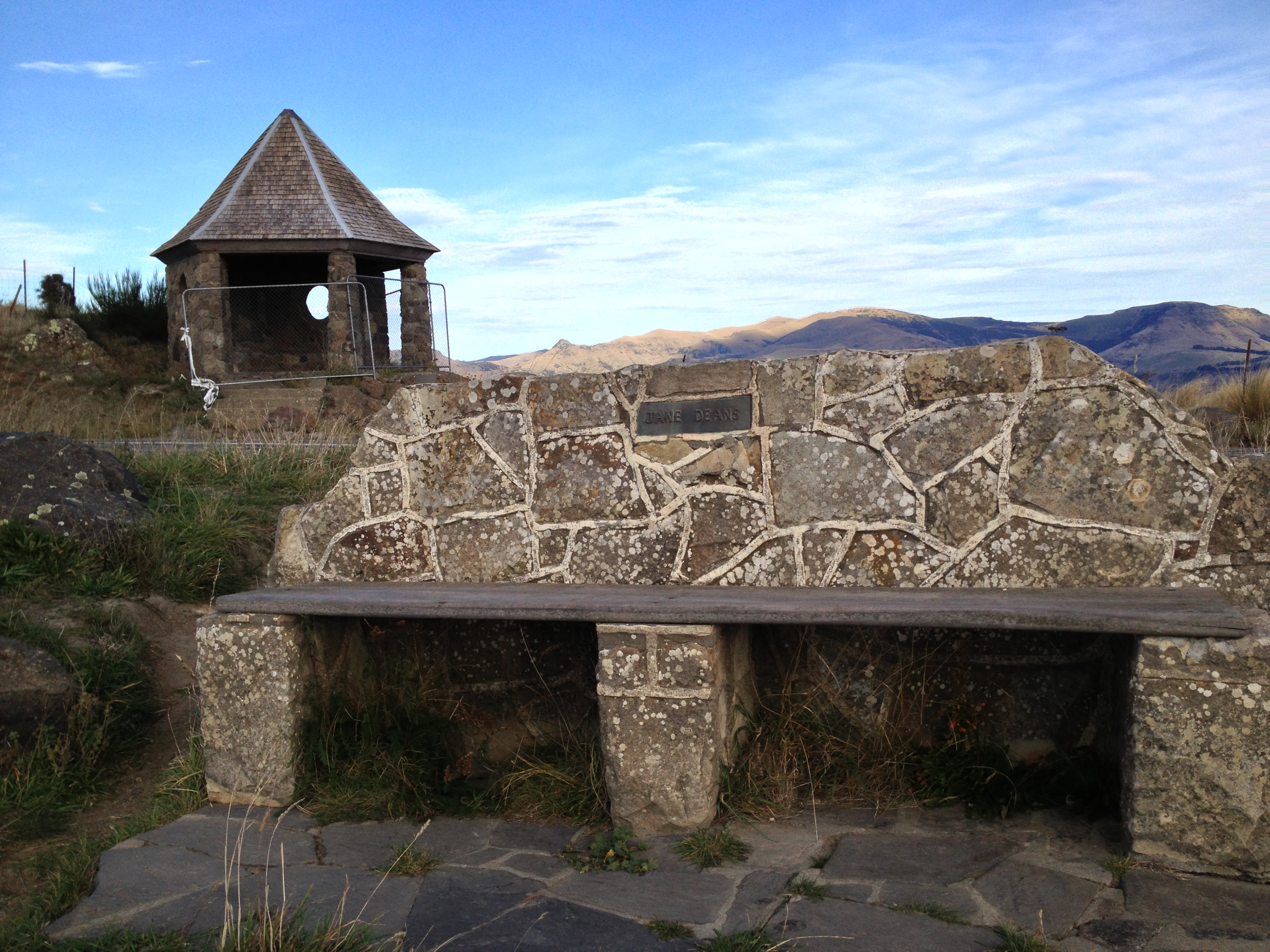
The Canterbury Pioneer Women's Memorial at the top of Bridle Path, with the Jane Deans memorial seat in the foreground

The Bridle Path is a steep shared-use track that traverses the northern rim of the Lyttelton volcano connecting the port of Lyttelton with the city of Christchurch in the South Island of New Zealand. It is so named because a Bridle path is a route used by horses, mounted or led. It is a popular walking and mountain biking route. The track ascends from the port itself to a height of 333 metres (1,093 ft) before descending again via Heathcote Valley to Christchurch. At the summit, next to the Summit Road, is a stone shelter with covered seats that is a 1940 New Zealand centennial memorial to the Pioneer Women of Canterbury. There are also seven commemorative stone seats placed along the Bridle Path; most of these were built for the 1950 Canterbury centenary celebrations.

Hastily constructed in late 1850, just in time for the first Canterbury Association settlers to use, it was the most direct way to travel from the port to the new settlements on the plains on the northern side of the Port Hills. Although very steep, it was the primary means of traversing the hills until the Sumner Road over Evans Pass was opened to light traffic in 1858. Originally, the road over Evans Pass was intended to be completed by the time the first settlers arrived but the Canterbury Association ran out of money. John Robert Godley had the road work stopped, and only had enough time to cut a rough Bridle Road once obtained further funding. A bridle path is a route used by The path was considered unsuitable for a fully loaded cart or dray.

The track is a legal road, so may be used by motor vehicles, such as trail bikes, though this is regarded as a nuisance. There have been attempts to change the legal status from road to park since the 1970s.

== Route ==
Originally called Bridle Road, the Bridle Path is a legal road between Lyttelton and Ferrymead. It was originally constructed as a way for the first Canterbury Association settlers to traverse the Port Hills that surround Lyttelton and take horses, cattle and sheep from the port to the land they would settle on the Canterbury Plains. The path was too steep to ride horses all the way, so riders had to dismount and lead their horses by the bridle over the steepest parts, hence the name. The lower sections of the historic pathway have become sealed roads bearing the name Bridle Path Road in both Lyttelton and the Heathcote Valley. The steeper part between the ends of the road remains a walking track to this day.

In January 1851, the Lyttelton Times observed:

"This means of communication between the port and the plain issues from the town of Lyttelton just to the west of the Custom-House Reserve, Norwich Quay, having been made perfectly passable for carts or drays up to its commencement. .... The ascent is steep; for a height of 1,100 feet is attained within 88 chains, or 1 mile and 176 yards; but, nevertheless, horses, bullocks, and mules will be able to carry a heavy pack to the top."

Today, the Bridle Path walkway commences at the end of Bridle Path Road which runs up the hill from near the Lyttelton portal of the Road Tunnel. The path ascends to the top of the ridge and traverses the crater rim and the Summit Road before descending to near the Heathcote portal of the Road Tunnel in the Gondala carpark. The track is a 2.4 km long walk that ascends to the 333 metres (1,093 ft) high summit takes about an hour to walk in one direction. The number 28 Lyttelton/Rapaki bus can be used to connect between the ends of the walk.

At the summit, where the Bridle Path meets the Summit Road, is the Canterbury Pioneer Women's Memorial as well as a visitors car park. Both the Crater Rim Walkway and Stan Helms Track meet the Bridle Path at the car park. All these tracks can be wet and slippery in winter and the city council advises walkers to proceed with caution. While dog-walking is allowed, dogs need to be kept on a lead.

== History ==
Charlotte Godley, in a letter written between 10 February and 3 May 1850, reported there was a pathway over the hills to the Dean's farm that her husband and Captain Thomas rode over when they first visited Lyttelton, on 12 May 1850. She wanted to see the plains too and persuaded another passenger who had already been to the top to show her the way. She reported they found a "very good, though steep, path to the top" and a "very fine" view of both the harbour and the plains. At that time, the road to Sumner was still being constructed but had reached a point where heavy blasting was required to get past some precipitous bluffs. Although a footpath had been formed along the route for the road-builders to use, that was so steep in places that ropes needed to be used to get past the bluffs. Shortly afterwards, John Godley ordered further spending on the road to cease and the workforce was retrenched.

A Bridle Road was surveyed in November 1850 by Edward Jollie at the direction of the Chief Surveyor, Captain Thomas, after John Godley, Agent for the Canterbury Association, managed to obtain funds to continue surveying and road building. A contract road gang operated by a Mr. Hughes and supervised by works overseer Donald Gollan formed the path, which was intended to be 8 feet (2.4 m) wide when complete. On the Heathcote Valley side, the path descended to the valley floor and then ran around to Ferrymead, at which point a ferry crossed the Heathcote River mouth at the head of the Estuary, where it met with the then still incomplete "Sumner Road". The estimated cost of constructing the road was about NZ£300 as of January 1851.

When Charlotte Godley travelled over this Bridle Road in early December 1850 the path was mostly formed, except for a small portion near the summit where they had to dismount and climb to the top over rough stones and rocks.

Heavy goods were usually shipped from Lyttelton to a dock at Ferrymead, but this was a hazardous journey as the sailing ships of the time needed to make an open sea journey between Lyttelton and Sumner Bay and then cross the Sumner Bar under favourable wind, sea and tide conditions. However, a fleet of small ships were prepared to undertake the journey despite the risks involved. Sometimes vessels would remain in port for days awaiting the right conditions rather than risk this journey. Even so, many a colonist lost all their worldly possessions when a boat capsized or was wrecked. Shipping fees were exorbitant, sometimes costing as much to ship goods across the Sumner Bar to Ferrymead as it did to ship them from England. Before the end of 1851, enterprising businessmen had formed an insurance company and were offering to insure goods just for this journey.

At the beginning of 1851 the Bridle Road also connected to a westward leading footpath that ran along the crater rim and then descended a ridge to footpaths that led to Riccarton as well as Christchurch. That path was just passable by cattle or horses at walking pace though considered easy for pedestrians or sheep to negotiate. Little was done to develop this westerly walking path until the early 20th century when the Summit Road was built.

By 8 November 1851, a refreshment stall had been set up at the summit. The fate of this enterprise is not recorded.

Between 1851 and 1854 nothing much was done to provide a better means of communication between the port and the plains. Both a "Select Committee" of the "Society of Land-Purchasers" and a Commission appointed by the Canterbury Provincial Council recommended completing the road to Sumner. Both examined various options, including road and railway tunnels, and the Commission devised a new, and easier road line, which involved a short tunnel under Evans Pass but avoided the difficult ground that involving blasting hard volcanic rock. The Council even passed enabling legislation in July 1855 to facilitate acquiring land for road construction. By 24 August 1857 road construction was sufficiently advanced that Superintendent Fitzgerald was able to navigate his "dog cart" all the way from Christchurch to Lyttelton to "open" the road, although it took until January 1858 for the road to be open to light traffic.

In 1862, New Zealand's first telegraph line between Christchurch and Lyttelton was constructed following this route, opening on 1 July 1862.

The opening of the Christchurch to Lyttelton Railway via the Moorhouse Tunnel in 1869 rendered this means of communicating between Lyttelton and Christchurch largely obsolete.

During the 1930s, the Bridle Path was reformed by the Public Works Department. The Summit Road was also opened in 1938, providing easier access.

The Bridle Path became a Historic Area on 6 April 2001.

The path remains a popular walking track today.

== Memorials ==
=== Pioneer women in Canterbury ===
At a meeting that re-established the Women's Branch of The Citizens' Association held on 29 November 1938, Miss Mildred Trent suggested that, as a centennial gift, a memorial to the pioneer women in Canterbury be erected at the intersection of the Bridle Path and the, then, recently opened Summit Road. The memorial was envisaged to take the form of sheltered seats and would be Canterbury women's contribution to New Zealand's centenary celebrations. The proposal met with unanimous approval.

The Canterbury Pioneer Women's Memorial is placed at the top of the Bridle Path next to the Summit Road. The foundation stone for the memorial was laid by Lilian Priscilla Wakefield, the granddaughter of Edward Gibbon Wakefield, on 16 December 1939. The shelter was designed by Heathcote Helmore. The memorial was unveiled on Saturday, 14 December 1940, with hundreds in attendance.

=== Commemorative stone seats ===
There are a total of seven commemorative stone seats placed along the Bridle Path; most of these were built for the Canterbury centenary celebrations in 1950.

=== Wayside Memorial Cross ===
A Wayside Memorial Cross was erected in 1856, at the request of Charlotte Godley, to mark the site of a small spring where she rested and drank the water. The first cross was made of white stone cross and erected near a water-tank on the path, but by July 1857 it had fallen over and was in pieces. The cross, having been vandalised numerous times, was replaced in 1864 and again in 1898. It was eventually destroyed in the 2011 earthquakes.

== Re-enactments ==
In December 1950, to mark the Canterbury centennial there was a re-enactment of the arrival of the First Four Ships where some of the descendants of the Canterbury Pilgrims dressed in period costume and walked over the Bridle Path.
