= Victoria Clock Tower =

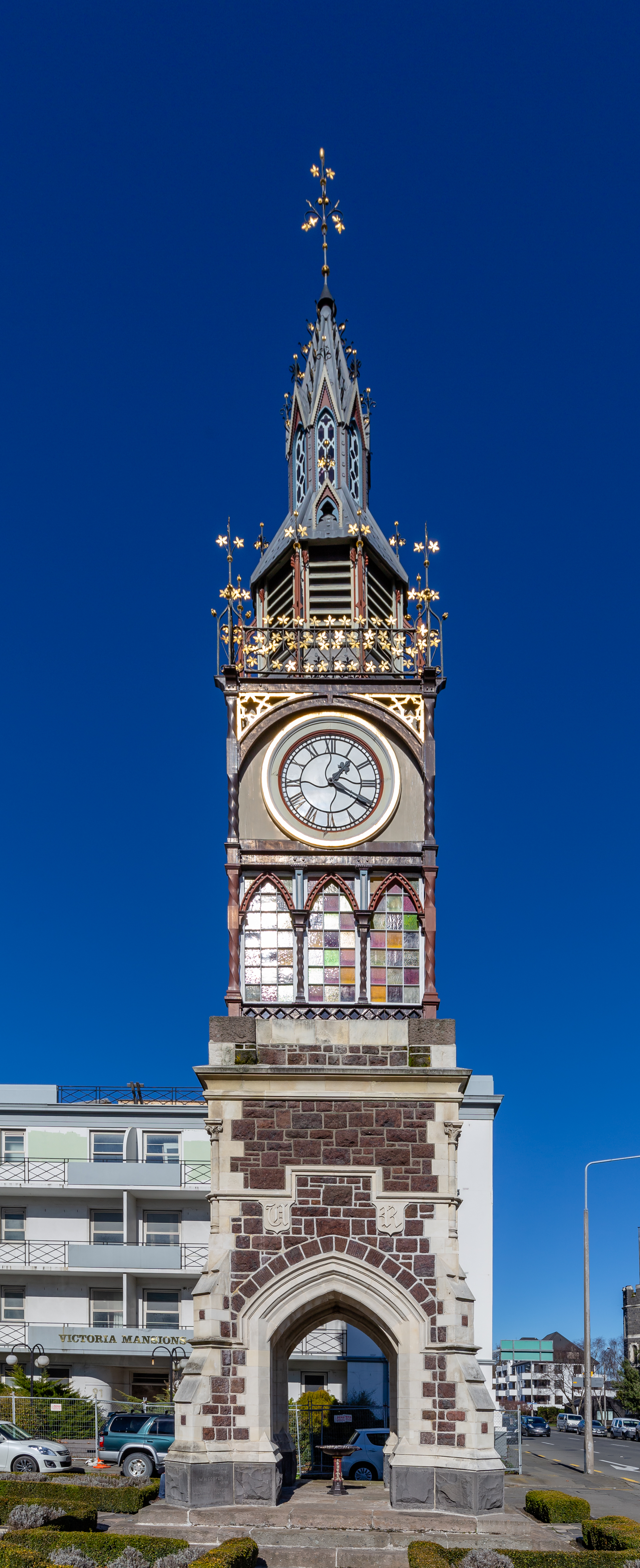
- Victoria Clock Tower, in front of Victoria Mansions, in August 2019
- Interactive map of Victoria Clock Tower
- 43°31′29.05″S 172°37′50.7″E
- Location: Victoria Street, Christchurch Central City

History
- Built: 1897
- Built for: Queen Victoria's Diamond Jubilee
- Rebuilt: 1930

Site notes
- Architect: Benjamin Mountfort
- Restored: 2003–2004
- Governing body: Christchurch City Council

Heritage New Zealand – Category 1
- Official name: Victoria Clock Tower
- Designated: 2 April 1985
- Reference no.: 3670

The Victoria Clock Tower, also known as the Diamond Jubilee Clock Tower, is a heritage-registered clock tower located in Christchurch, New Zealand. Designed by Benjamin Mountfort, it is registered as a "Historic Place – Category I" by the New Zealand Historic Places Trust.

== History ==
=== Canterbury Provincial Council Buildings ===
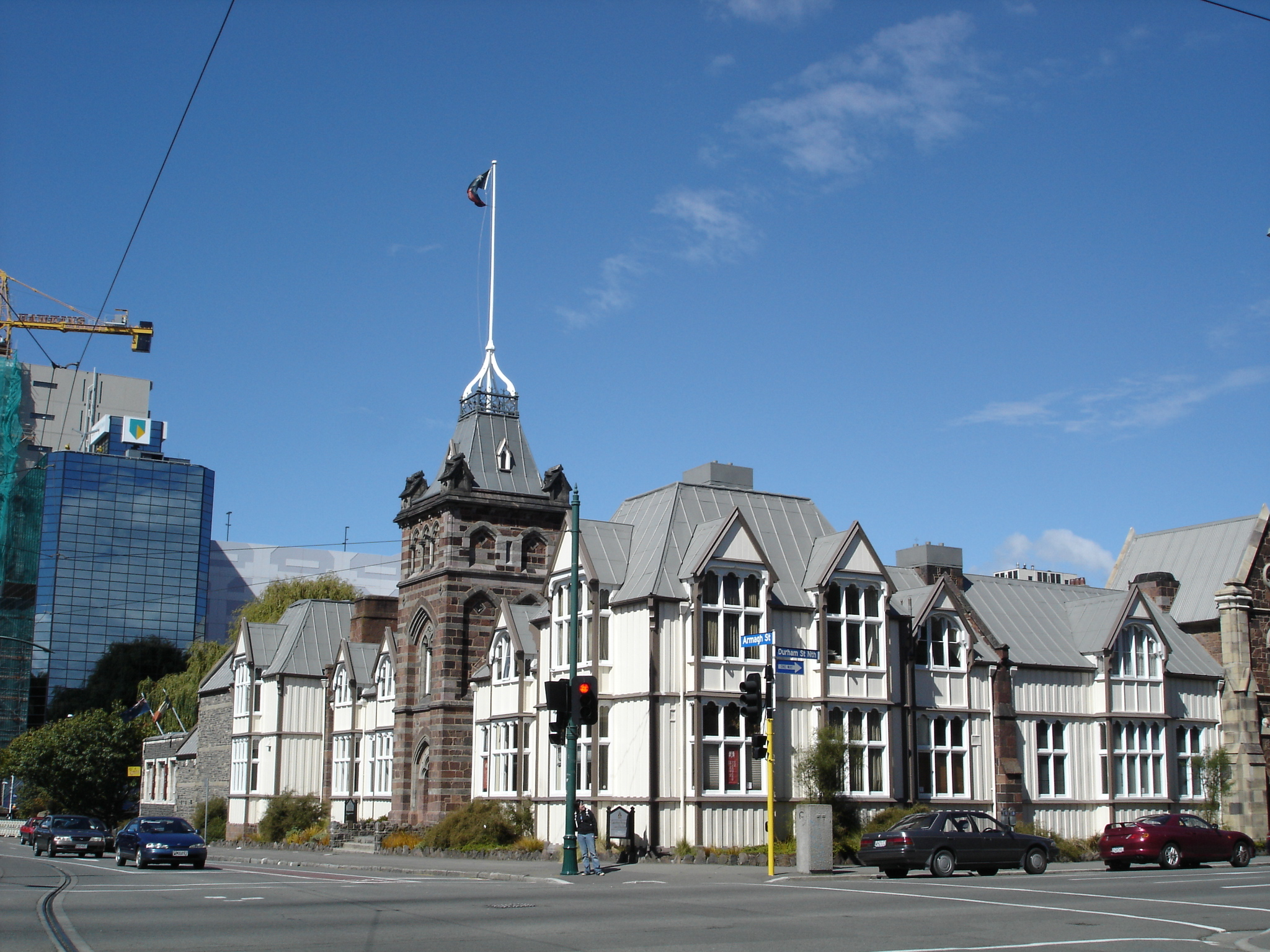
The clock was first placed in the stone tower of the Canterbury Provincial Council Buildings.

Mountfort designed the clock tower in ca 1858, to be placed on top of the first (wooden) section of the Canterbury Provincial Council Buildings. The iron tower and clock was constructed in Coventry and arrived in December 1860 in 147 boxes, but it was determined that the building structure would be unable to support the tower's weight. The clock was then placed in the stone tower of the Provincial Council Buildings in Armagh Street, and whilst its face could not be seen, the chime could be heard for a distance of 2 miles. The clock was not in good repair, impacted by the sea journey, and it remained in the tower for a short time only. The iron tower, meanwhile, stood for several years in the courtyard of the Provincial Council Buildings.

With the abolition of Provincial Government in New Zealand in 1876, the clock tower became the property of the Crown, but it was transferred to Christchurch City Council.

=== High / Manchester intersection ===
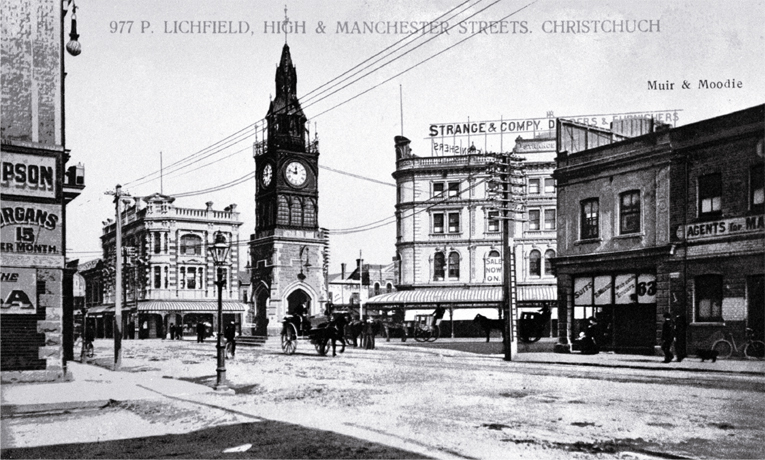
Victoria Clock Tower, photographed from the intersection of Manchester Street and Bedford Row, looking in a south-west direction.

After being stored for 30 years in a council yard in Worcester Street, it was decided that the tower would be used as part of a monument to the Diamond Jubilee of Queen Victoria. A competition for a stone tower was held and won by the local architecture firm of Strouts and Ballantyne. The clock was returned to the United Kingdom for renovation, and the addition of chimes. In 1897 it was erected on a stone base at the intersection of Manchester Street, Lichfield Streets and High Streets and remained there until 1930 when it was removed due to it being deemed a traffic hazard and impediment. The Hamilton Borough Council unsuccessfully tried to buy the clock tower at this point.

=== Montreal / Victoria intersection ===
It was relocated that year to its current location on a reserve at the intersection of Victoria and Montreal Streets and the clock was replaced.

Restoration work was carried out in 1930 as part of the relocation. Further restoration was carried out as a community project, financed by local businesses, in 1978. More substantial renovation was carried out in 2003–2004, including earthquake strengthening. The middle section of the tower was braced with steel, and rods were inserted into the stonework. The renovation budget was NZ$295,000.

== Heritage listing ==
On 2 April 1985, the clock tower was registered as a Category I heritage item, with the registration number being 3670. The tower is significant, as it is a landmark in Christchurch, and it was part of Mountfort's original design for the Provincial Council Buildings. The tower is further a remarkable example of High Victorian ironwork, and its use as a monument to Queen Victoria's Diamond Jubilee are an indication of the colonial ties between New Zealand and Britain.

== Earthquake damage ==
The clock tower was seriously damaged in the 22 February 2011 Christchurch earthquake, with the time (12:51) stopped on the clock's face. Repairs in excess of NZ$700,000 were agreed to by Christchurch City Councillors in July 2012, with most of the cost to be reimbursed by insurance. Stones in the buttress columns and arches were loose or dislodged, and the finial spike needed to be repaired. The clock itself needed to be restored, but it was considered to leave one of the clock faces at 12:51 as a reminder of the earthquake.

Christchurch City Council began restoration work on the historic clock tower, corner of Montreal and Victoria Streets, in March 2013. On 22 October 2014, Christchurch Mayor Lianne Dalziel officially unveiled the newly restored Central City landmark, Jubilee Clock Tower, and placed a time capsule on the site for future generations to discover.

The careful restoration has included deconstructing each of the tower legs and the construction of a new internal reinforced concrete structure to strengthen them. The existing foundations were strengthened. The original stone was cut and used as a veneer in the same place it used to be on the clocktower. The clocktower's spire was straightened, strengthened and reinstated.

Work was also undertaken to divert the artesian well that was found under the clocktower away from Montreal Street. The original clock mechanism was also carefully serviced while restoration of the clocktower was underway.

== See also ==
- List of oldest buildings in Christchurch
