= Stoneways =

Heritage building in Auckland, New Zealand

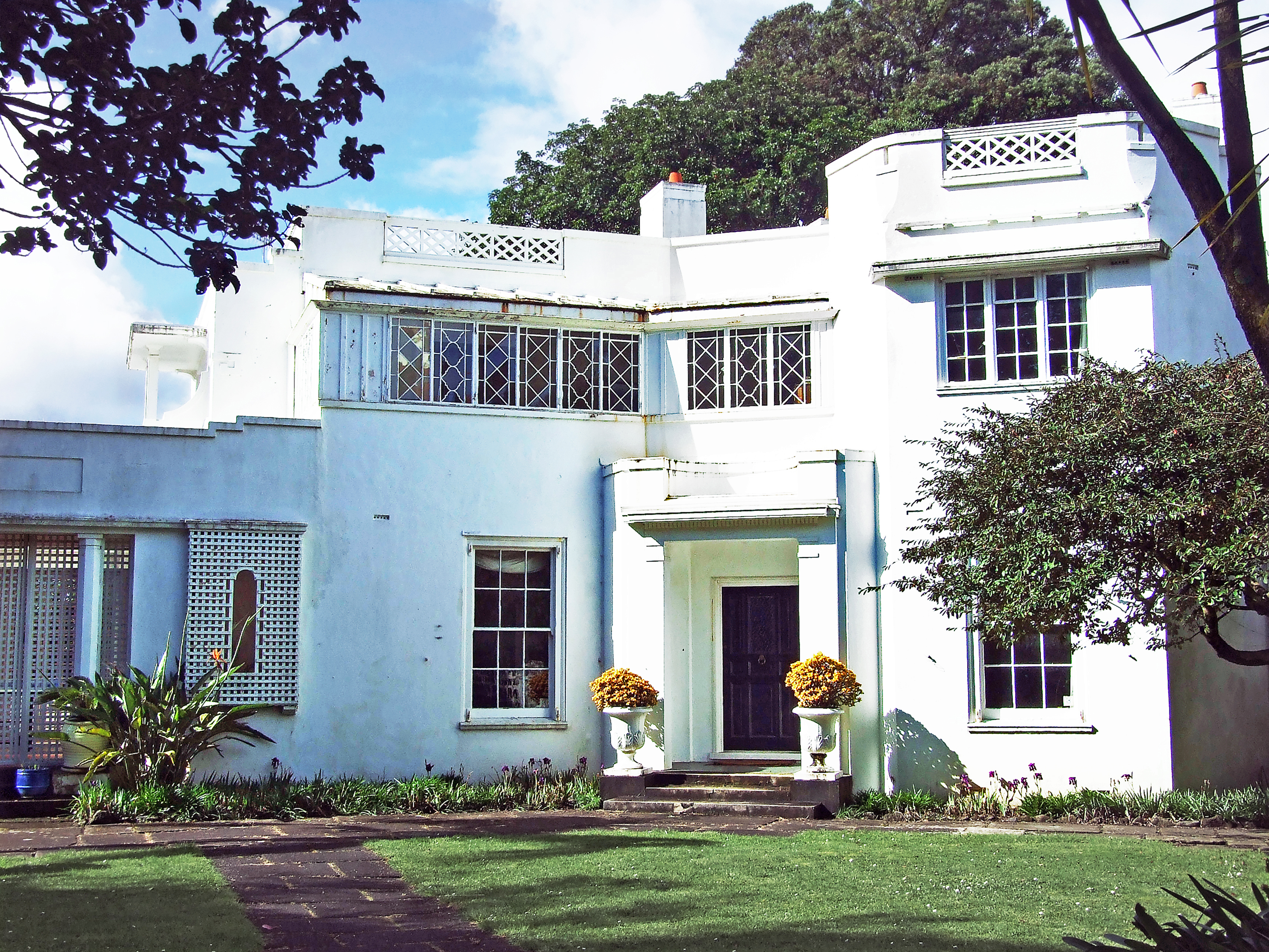
- Stoneways in 2012
- Interactive map of the Stoneways area

General information
- Type: Private home
- Location: Epsom, 46 Mountain Road, Auckland, New Zealand
- Coordinates: 36.869556°S 174.76975°E
- Year built: 1926

Technical details
- Material: Concrete
- Size: 475 m^{2} (5,110 sq ft)
- Floor count: 2.5
- Grounds: 1,211 m^{2} (13,040 sq ft)

Design and construction
- Architect: William Gummer

Heritage New Zealand – Category 1
- Designated: 12 December 2010
- Reference no.: 4499

Stoneways is a 1920s home in Epsom, Auckland, New Zealand, listed as a Category I building by Heritage New Zealand. The building was designed by architect William Gummer as his private residence.

== Description ==
Stoneways is a two-and-a-half storey building located opposite Auckland Grammar School, built with a concrete frame. The house's style is an eclectic blend of elements from Spanish mission styles, Art Deco and Arts and Crafts. The name of the house was chosen due to it being located atop solid stone lava flows from Maungawhau.

== History ==
The land on which Stoneways was built was originally a part of William Aitken's Rockwood estate. New Zealand architect William Gummer, one of the founders of the architectural firm Gummer and Ford, purchased a section of the estate in 1924 after his marriage to Edith Oiroa Batley, in order to build a residence for his family. Stoneways was one of only 14 private residences that Gummer designed. After the house was constructed in 1926, Gummer lived here with his family for most of his life.

The house was purchased by Supreme Court Judge Terence Gresson in 1957. On 10 December 2010, it was classified as a Historic Place Category I by the New Zealand Historic Places Trust. The house changed ownership in 1998 and 2017, after which architect Anthony Matthews of Matthews & Matthews refurbished the interior of the residence.
