= Mildred Trent =

New Zealand cook, tearooms manager, and community worker

Mildred Annie Trent (8 July 1883 – 9 February 1942) was a notable New Zealand cook, tearooms manager and community worker. She was born in Christchurch, New Zealand, in 1883.

Her first book, Stevens' "Cathedral Brand" essences cookery book, was published in 1920 by the manufacturer of the essences, H. F. Stevens. It was used as a giveaway to promote the essences. In 1924 The Up-to-date Cook's Book was published by Gordon & Gotch. A second and revised edition was published in 1928.

Trent proposed in November 1938 that the Canterbury Pioneer Women's Memorial be built. It opened two years later.
