= Frederick Gurnsey =

New Zealand carver and teacher (1868–1953)

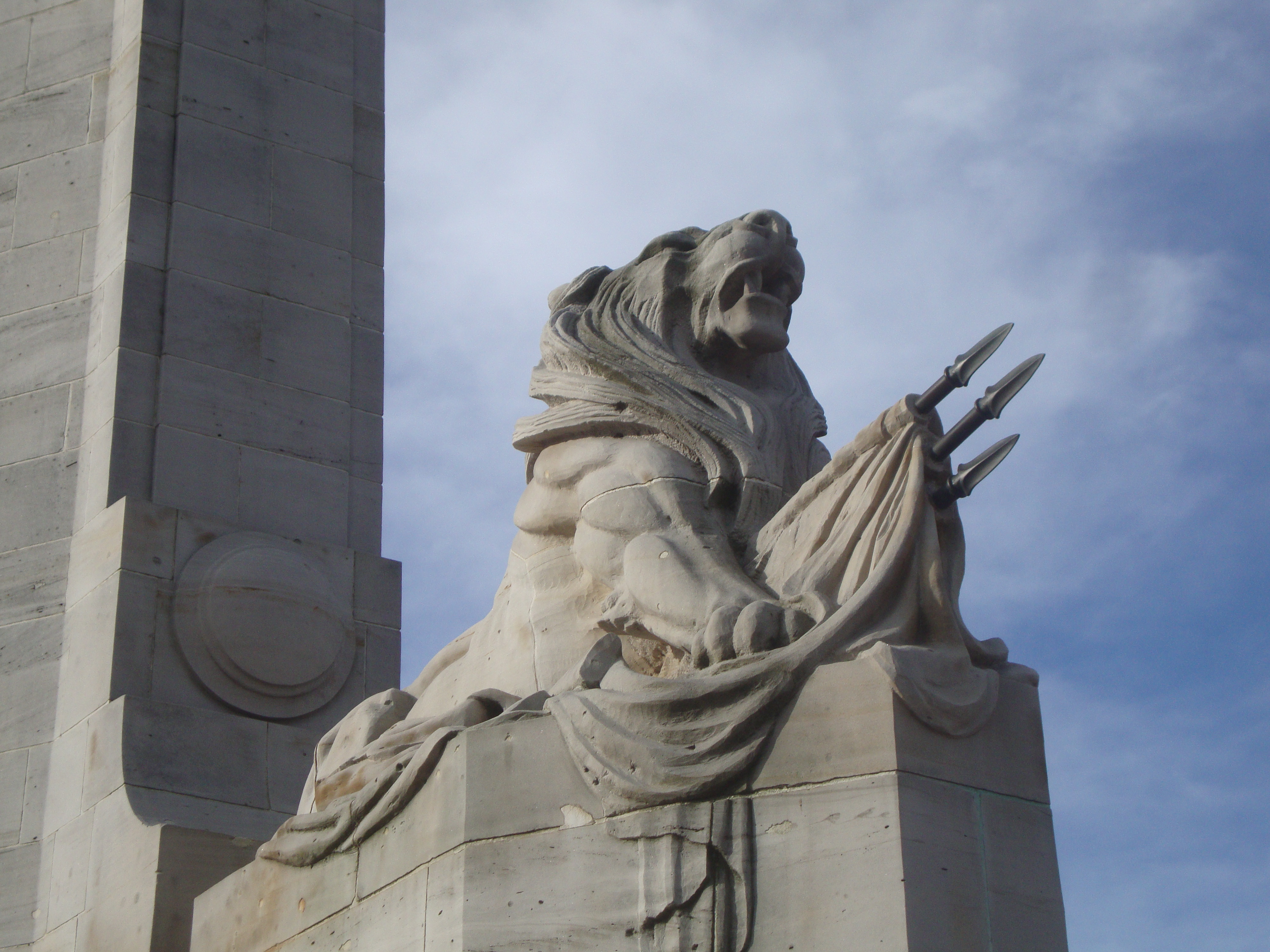
Lion at the Bridge of Remembrance carved by Gurnsey

Frederick George Gurnsey (18 January 1868 – 23 October 1953) was a New Zealand carver and art teacher. He was born in Newport, Monmouthshire, Wales on 18 January 1868. He did the carvings for the Bridge of Remembrance in Christchurch. The carvings in the sanctuary of the Nurses' Memorial Chapel at Christchurch Hospital are by Frederick Gurnsey and Jack Vivian. His carved mural in the Canterbury Pioneer Women's Memorial is not regarded as successful.

The Oamaru stone font in All Saints' Church in Hokitika was carved by Gurnsey.
