= New Zealand Guardian Trust Building =

Category 1 Historic Place

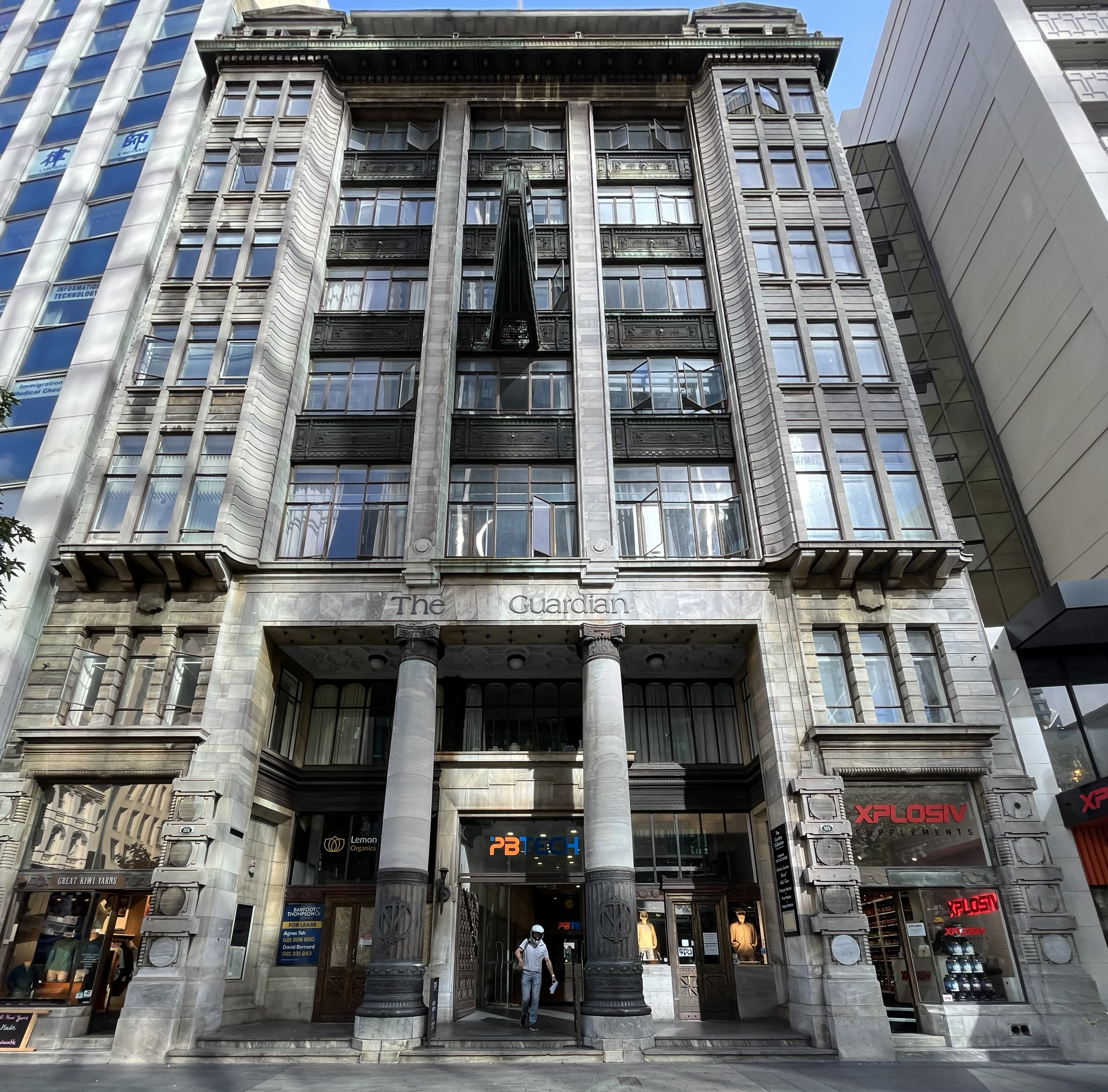
- Interactive map of New Zealand Guardian Trust Building

General information
- Architectural style: Stripped Classical
- Location: 101-107 Queen Street, Auckland
- Coordinates: 36°50′45.54″S 174°45′57.57″E
- Completed: 1918

Design and construction
- Architect: William Gummer

Heritage New Zealand – Category 1
- Designated: 19 April 1990
- Reference no.: 623

New Zealand Guardian Trust Building is a category 1 historic place in Auckland, New Zealand, designed by William Gummer.

== History ==
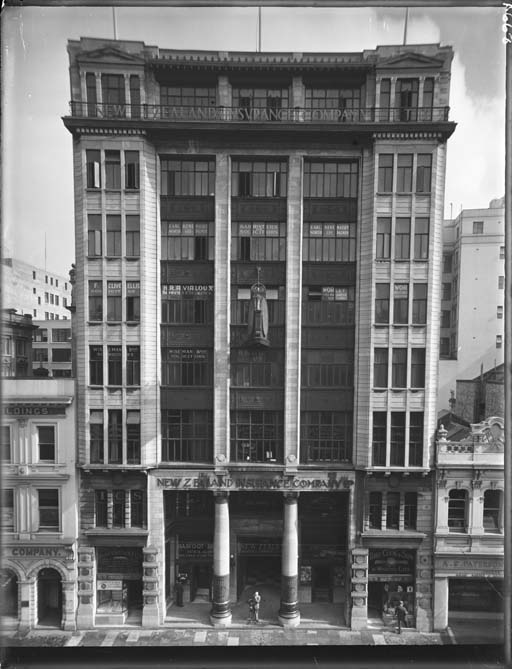
New Zealand Guardian Trust Building, after 1918

Opened in 1918, the New Zealand Guardian Trust Building was one of the first high-rise offices in Auckland. It was also Gummer's "first important building for New Zealand." Now, it is the earliest high-rise that is still standing in Auckland.

The New Zealand Guardian Trust Building was the headquarters of the New Zealand Insurance Company (NZI). It replaced their existing three-storey building on the same site, which had been designed in the 1870s by Richard Keels. The building housed both the head and branch office, and had an addition 137 offices that were leased to other businesses.

In 1982, after NZI merged with the South British Insurance Company, the building was given the name the New Zealand Guardian Trust Building.

In the early 2000s, six floors of the floors were redeveloped into apartments and it is occasionally known as the Guardian Apartments.

== Architecture ==
On an L-shaped site, between Queen St, Mills Lane and Exchange Lane, William Gummer built the New Zealand Guardian Trust Building in a Stripped Classical style. This site posed challenges for light and ventilation, as Mills Lane was 8 metres higher than the Queen Street front of the building, meaning that the first two floors only had an aspect onto Queen Street.

The eight-storey building was built from a steel frame, encased in concrete, and faced with Tākaka marble. Shaw described the main frontage, on Queen Street, as "of unusual severity compared with other office buildings of the period." He also noted a "strong verticality" to this frontage, with piers to the second floor with "dark recessed spandrels and wide, steel framed windows between." Gummer utilised bronze based and capped columns in this buildings façade, which he went on to deploy in other New Zealand Insurance buildings.

The frontage is also known for the large clock on the front of the building, which was incorporated from the earlier NZI building on the site.

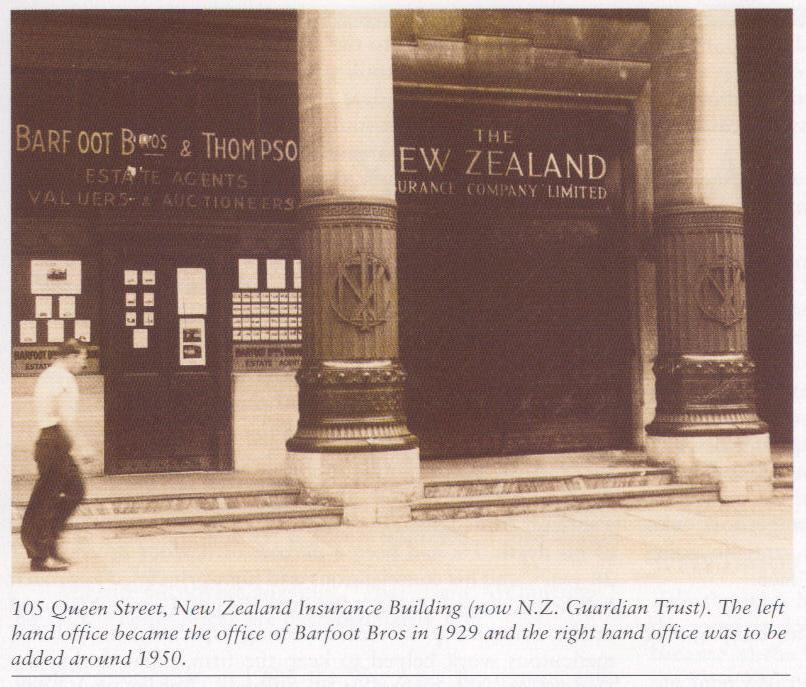
Column bases

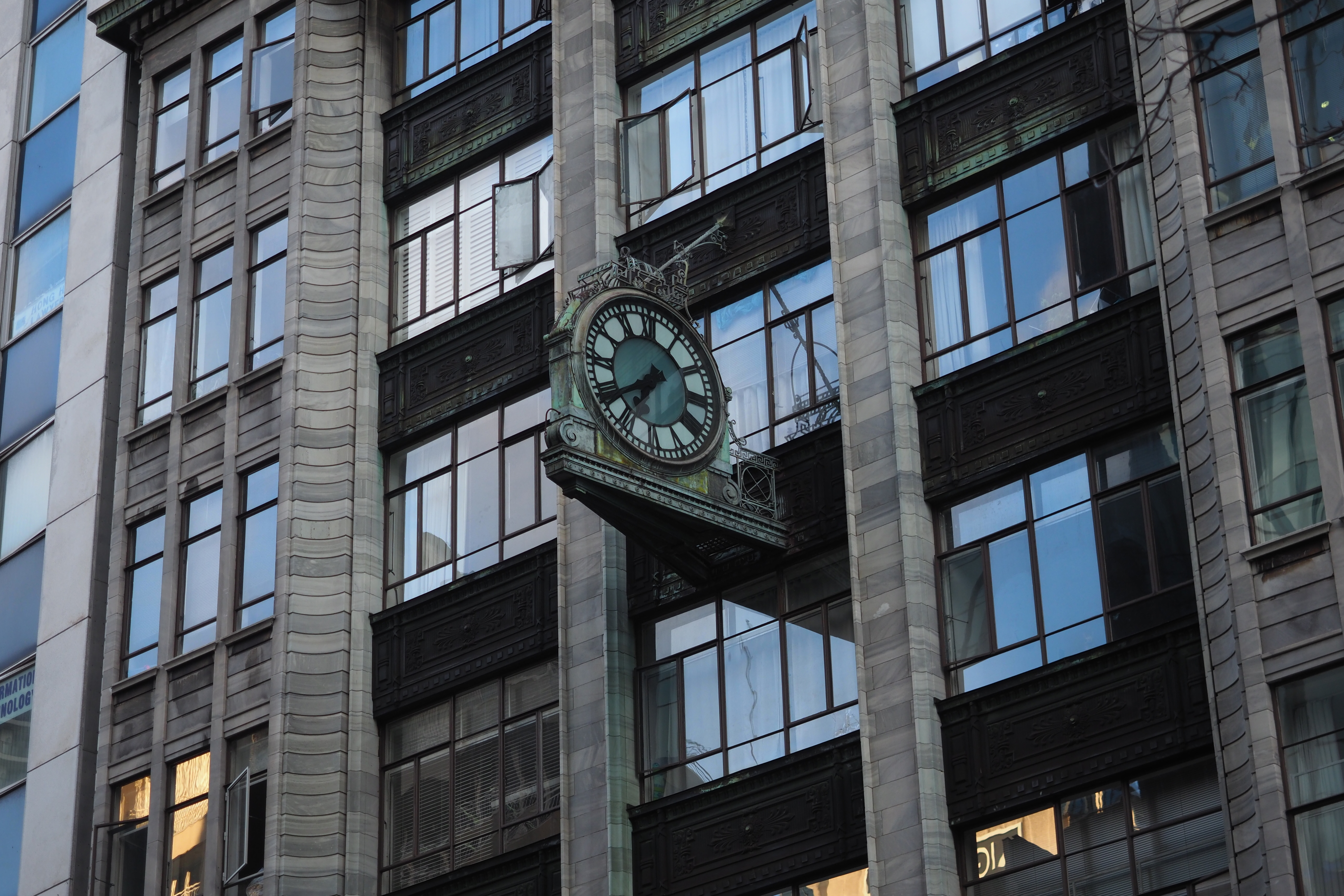
Clock

=== Interior ===
Mađanović et al. noted that the overall impression of the interior of the building on the visitor was "that the building is much bigger and more luxurious than it is." The floor plan was in two parts, the Mills Lane side, which is the back of the building was the NZI offices, with the area towards Queen Street, the leased offices. These two areas were "separated by the centre circulation space and two internal courtyards that allow light and ventilation into the middle of the building."

The central circulation space had a mosaic floor, and the building was known for its large primary staircase. The interior walls were marble and timber, with white plaster used for the upper sections of the walls and for the ceiling. Ornamentation of the walls was restricted to some geometric patterns in the white plaster.

=== Refurbishments and modifications ===
In the 1960s, the clock was refurbished and there were internal alterations. In 1982, an additional, ninth storey was added to the building. The oak staircase and mezzanine floors, where the NZI headquarters offices were originally located, are no longer in the building. Extensive interior redevelopment in 2000s created 169 apartments.
