= Victoria Mansions =

Building in Christchurch, New Zealand

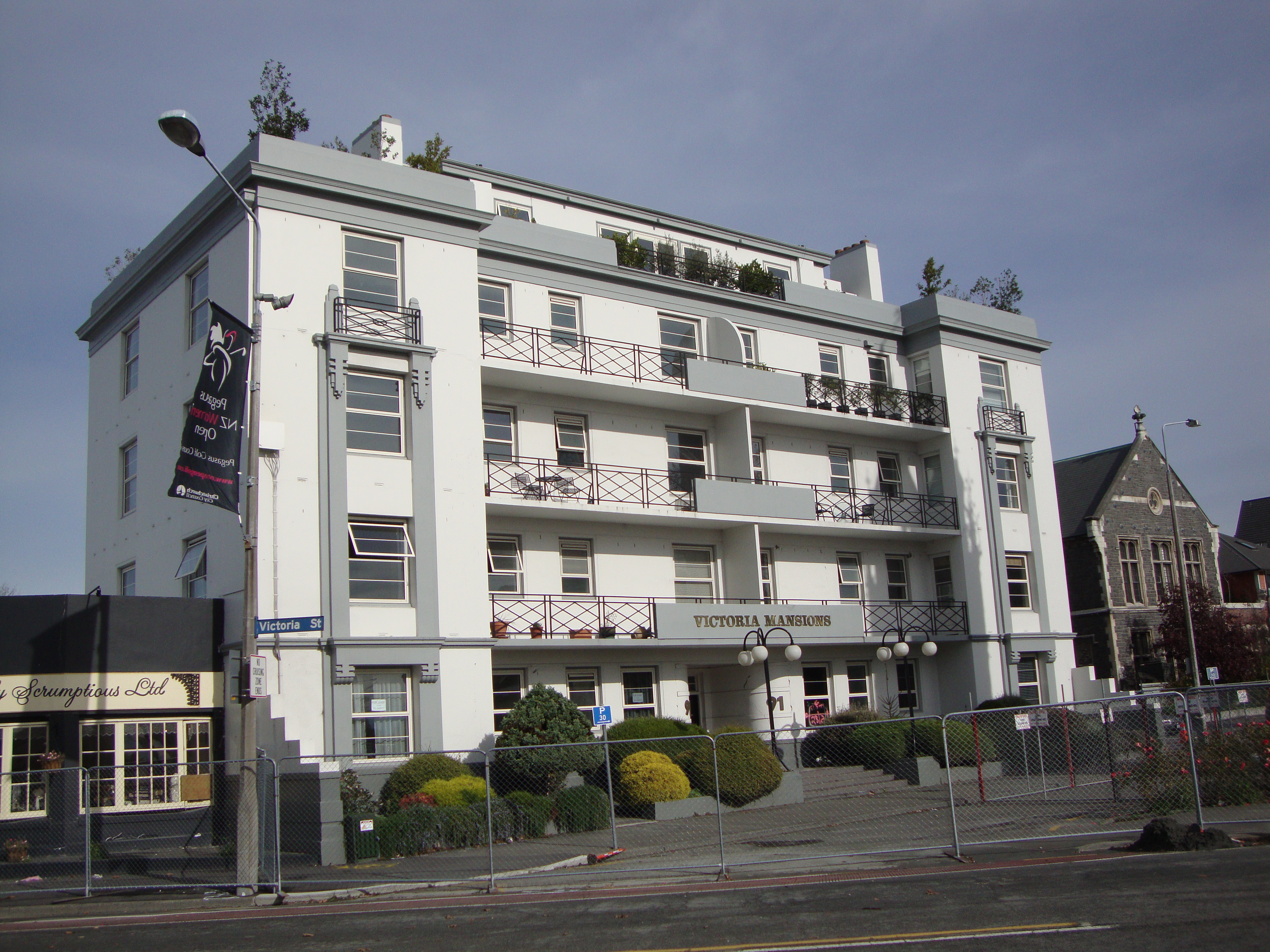
- Victoria Mansions following the 2011 Christchurch earthquake
- Interactive map of the Victoria Mansions area

General information
- Type: Residential apartments
- Architectural style: Art Deco architecture
- Location: Corner Victoria, Salisbury and Montreal Sts, Christchurch Central City, 91 Victoria Street; Christchurch
- Coordinates: 43.524939°S 172.630818°E
- Construction started: 1935; 91 years ago
- Completed: 1936; 90 years ago

Technical details
- Floor count: 5

Design and construction
- Architect: Heathcote Helmore

Heritage New Zealand – Category 2
- Reference no.: 3142

Victoria Mansions is a residential Category II heritage building in central Christchurch, New Zealand.

Heathcote Helmore had the commission in 1931 to design the building; he designed in Art Deco as was fashionable at the time. In March 1935, Victoria Mansions Limited was formed to undertake the development. They expected to pay NZ£2,800 for the land and NZ£18,000 for the building. Located immediately south of the Victoria Clock Tower, the land had three street frontages: 82 feet (25 m) to the north (Salisbury Street), 100 feet (30 m) to Montreal Street, and 88 feet (27 m) to Victoria Street. Construction started in June 1935, with five apartments on each floor, plus a single rooftop apartment, making 21 apartments in total. A small restaurant was attached on the Victoria Street frontage, with adjacent garages. Apartments were ready for occupation in May 1936.

The building was damaged in the February 2011 Christchurch earthquake and has since stood empty. The adjoining restaurant was demolished after the earthquakes. In 2020, it was announced that the building will be restored, and a fifth storey added for two rooftop penthouses. Though this proposal was never finalised.

In 2025, a New Zealand property developer applied for consent to redevelop the building, which includes adding two more storeys to the building and an upgraded facade.

== Notable occupiers ==
- Henry Cotterill (1855–1943), of Duncan Cotterill (law firm); from 1936
