= Canterbury Provincial Council Buildings =

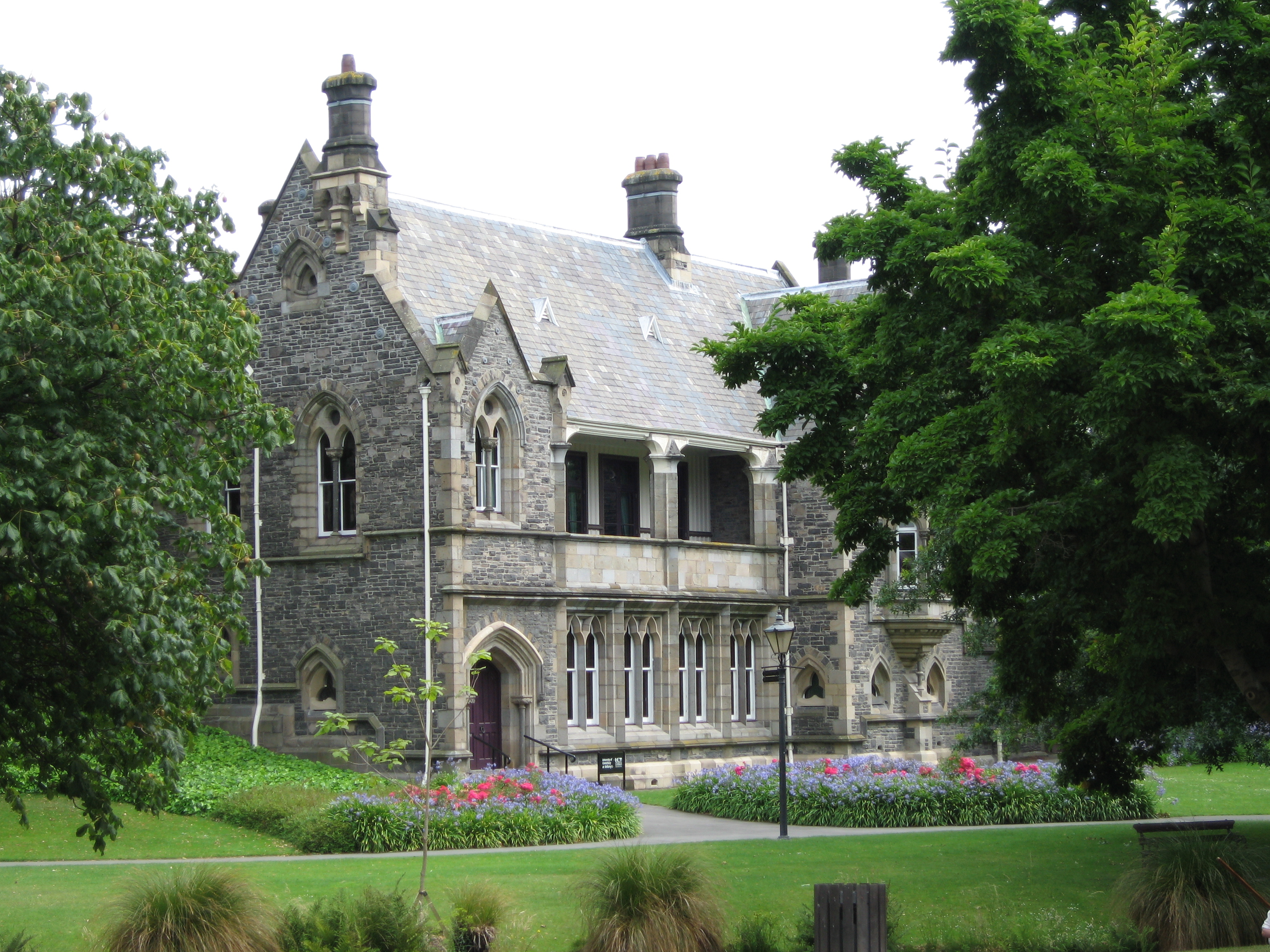
- The Bellamy's building viewed across the Avon River
- Alternative names: Canterbury Provincial Government Buildings

General information
- Type: Government administration
- Architectural style: Gothic Revival
- Location: Armagh, Durham and Gloucester Streets, Christchurch Central City, 280–284 Durham St, Christchurch
- Coordinates: 43.5292°S 172.634°E
- Construction started: 1858
- Client: Canterbury Provincial Council
- Owner: Christchurch City Council

Design and construction
- Architect: Benjamin Mountfort

Website
- official website

Heritage New Zealand – Category 1
- Official name: Canterbury Provincial Government Buildings
- Designated: 7 April 1983
- Reference no.: 45

References
- "Canterbury Provincial Government Buildings". New Zealand Heritage List/Rārangi Kōrero. Heritage New Zealand.

The Canterbury Provincial Council Buildings are the buildings of the Canterbury Provincial Council that administered the Canterbury Province from 1853 until the abolition of provincial government in 1876. The buildings are the only purpose-built provincial government buildings in New Zealand still in existence. The buildings were substantially damaged in the February 2011 Christchurch earthquake, and partially demolished by the Christchurch City Council.

== Location ==
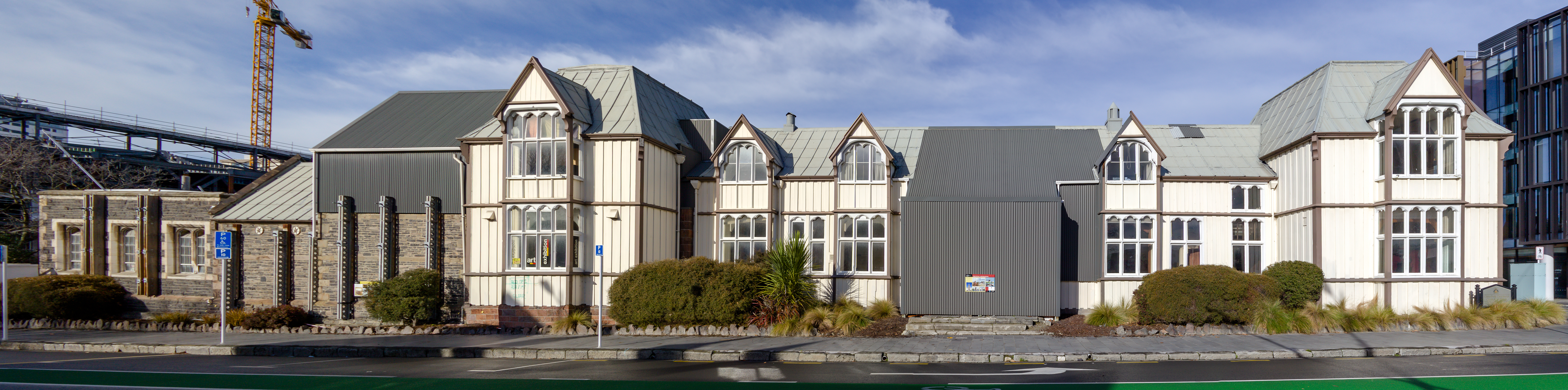
View along Armagh Street

The buildings are located in Christchurch Central City. They occupy the block surrounded by Armagh Street, Durham Street, Gloucester Street and the Avon River.

== Historical context ==
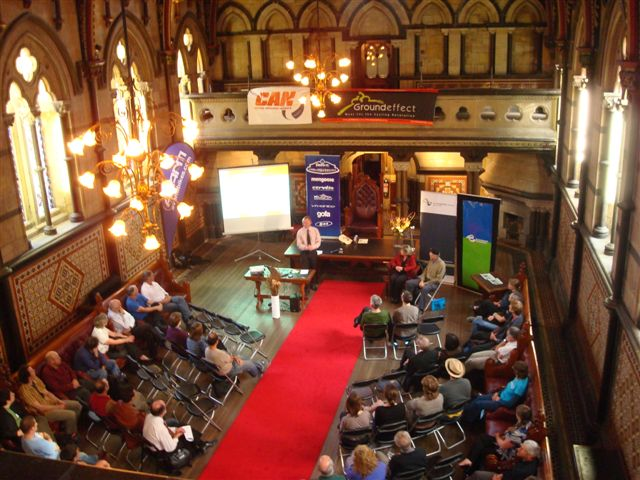
2008 Cycle Friendly Awards ceremony held in the Stone Chamber

The New Zealand Constitution Act 1852, passed by the Parliament of the United Kingdom, established a bicameral New Zealand Parliament, with the lower house (the House of Representatives) being elected by popular vote, and the upper house (the Legislative Council) being appointed. Votes were to be cast under a simple FPP system by telling ones choice of candidate to the election officer, as the secret ballot had not yet been introduced. The legislation also introduced provincial government, with an initial six provinces (and ultimately ten). At the time of the 1853 election, there were no political parties in New Zealand. As such, all candidates were independents. Provincial governments and the House of Representatives were elected around the same time in 1853. Provincial governments were led by a Superintendent, who were elected separately.

== Building history ==
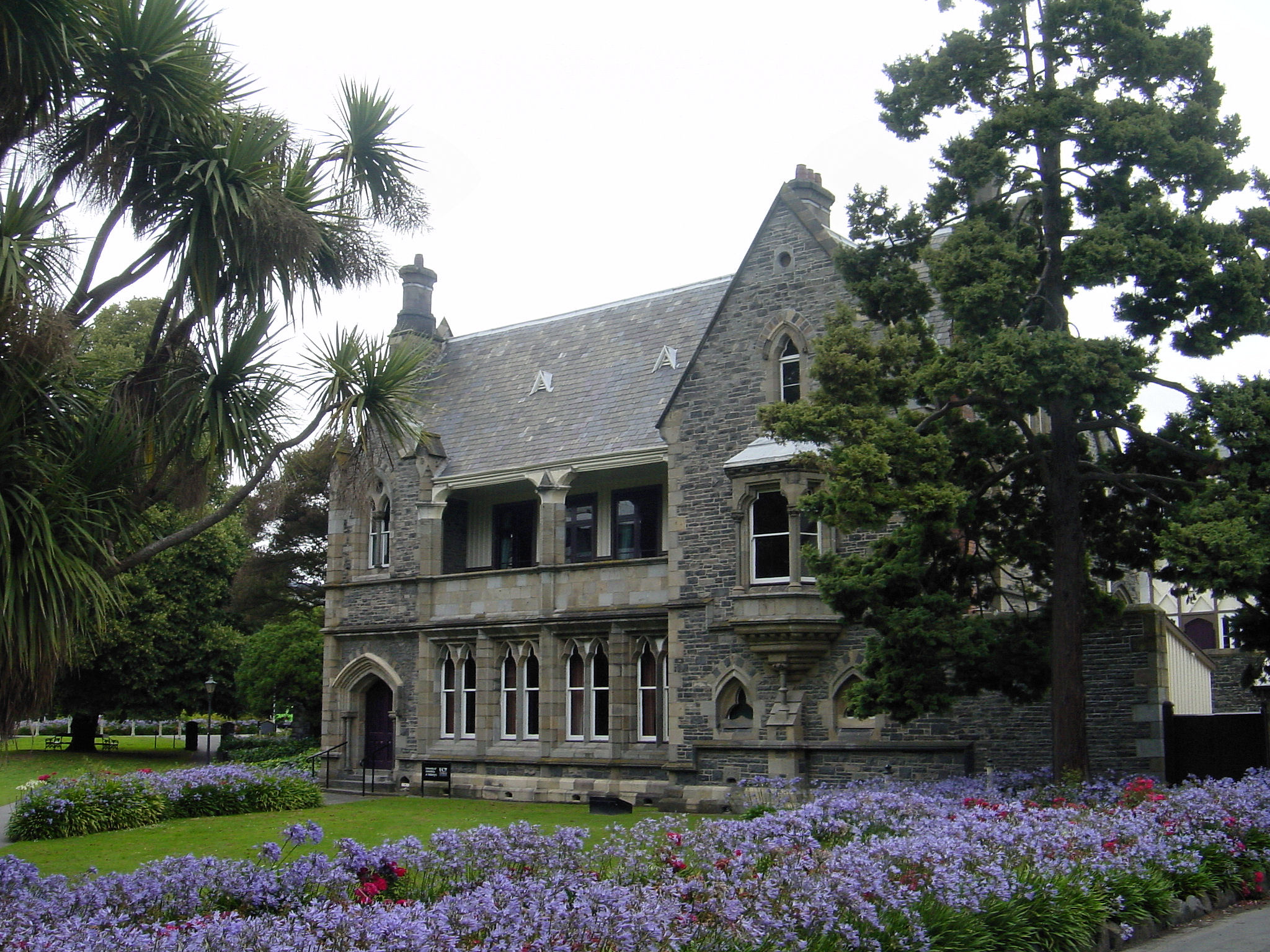
Bellamy's building and gardens, January 2007

The foundation stone for the first building was laid in January 1858. The first set of buildings were a two-storey timber building, forming an L shape along the Durham Street frontage, with the Timber Chamber, modelled on 14th and 16th century English manorial halls, the meeting room for the Provincial Council. The Timber Chamber was behind the street frontage and was first used in September 1859. An extension to the north had already been commissioned at that time, which was opened in 1861. This extension was along Durham and Armagh Streets and, together with the existing buildings, formed a courtyard. The third and last set of buildings was constructed in 1864–1865. The Stone Chamber was the new meeting room for the council; it was larger than the Timber Chamber to cope with an increased size of the council. Its interior is described as provincial architect Benjamin Mountfort's most impressive achievement. Bellamy's, the refreshment rooms, were added to the back of the Timber Chamber.

The buildings are the only purpose-built provincial government buildings in New Zealand still in existence these days. The other remaining building is that of the Southland Province in Invercargill, which was built in 1864 as a Masonic lodge and was purchased by the Southland Provincial Council as their council chambers in 1866.

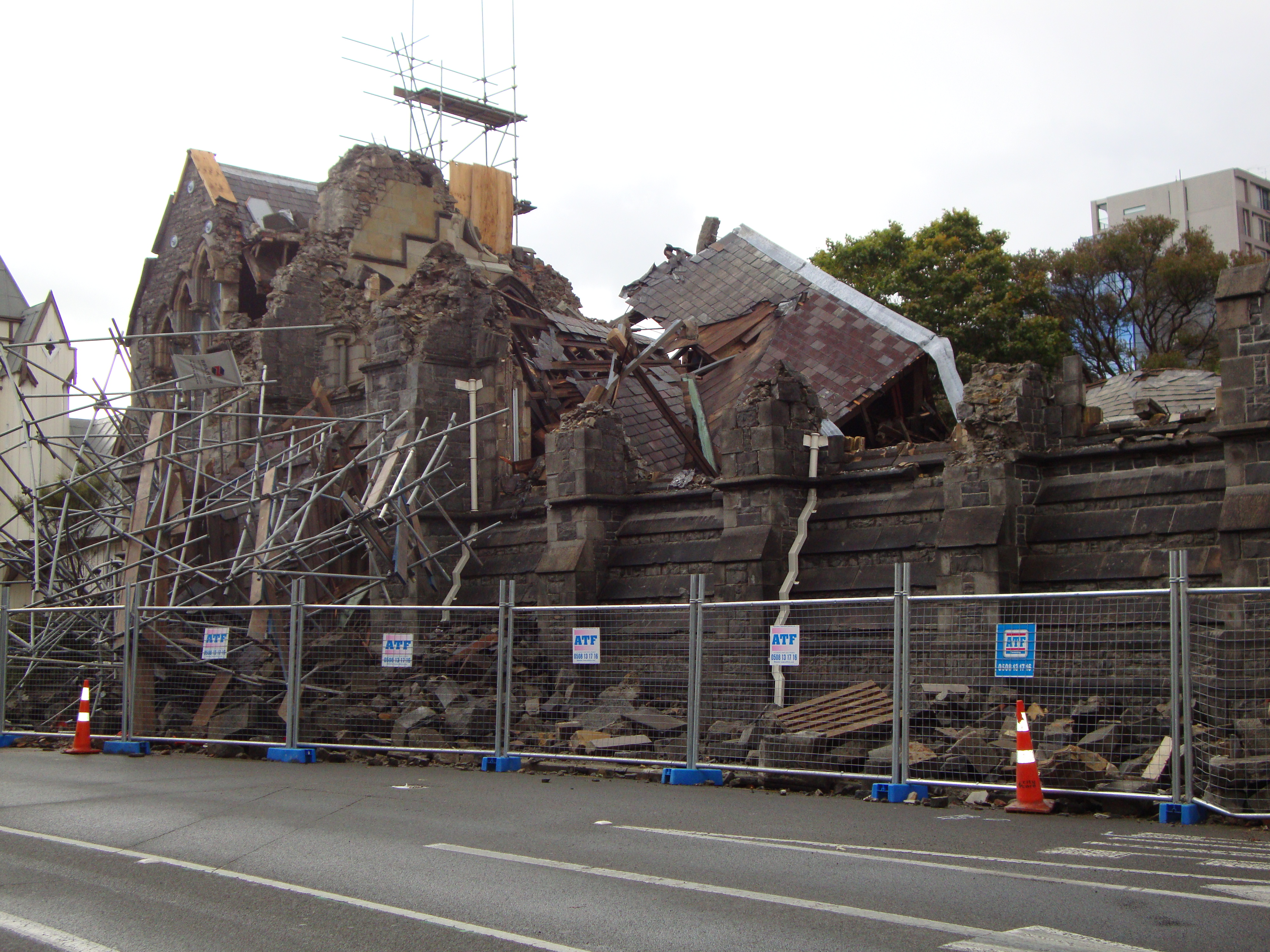
The Stone Chamber collapsed in the February 2011 Christchurch earthquake

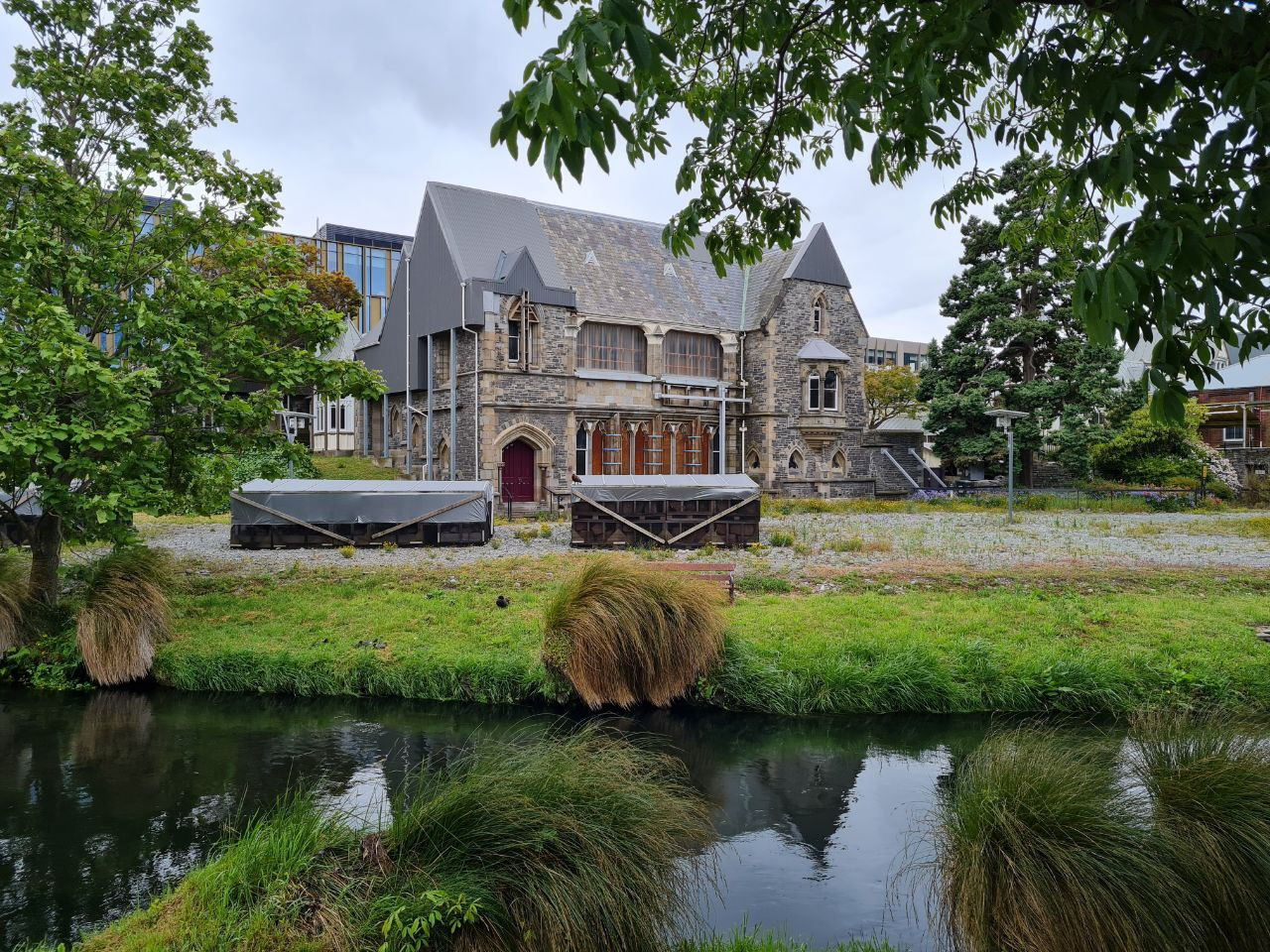
The earthquake-damaged Bellamy's building, with external bracing, January 2023

=== Earthquake damage ===
The buildings were substantially damaged in the February 2011 Christchurch earthquake. The stone tower on Armagh Street, which acted as the buildings' entrance on their north side and which held the clock of the Victoria Clock Tower in the early years, collapsed. Dr Ian Lochhead, Associate Professor of Art History at the University of Canterbury, said that the Stone Chamber was for many the single biggest heritage loss of the February earthquake. Lochhead, who was an advisor for the restoration of the buildings from 1981, called for the reconstruction of the Stone Chamber. Detailed engineering assessments showed that the buildings received so much damage that significant portions would have to be rebuilt. A report was due to be given to Christchurch City Councillors in June 2013 outlining the options.

=== Reconstruction and restoration ===
In 2018, the Christchurch City Council pushed out all restoration work of the buildings to at least 2029 as it did not have the funds to pay for the estimated $204 million repair bill. In 2021, it put aside $20M in its budget to start restoration work, though the money was not expected to be spent until at least 2027.

In March 2023, the council proposed to bring funding forward, from the later 2027 date to the 2023/24 council budget. The funding includes $2.1M for restoration of the building, which would allow for the first stage of restoration work to go ahead. The remaining $18M will be spent periodically over the next few years, with the exact timeline decided as part of the council’s new 10-year budget in 2024.The first stage of would include the reconstruction and restoration of the wooden buildings and stone towers on Durham and Armagh Streets.

== See also ==
- List of oldest buildings in Christchurch
