= William Gummer =

New Zealand architect (1884–1966)

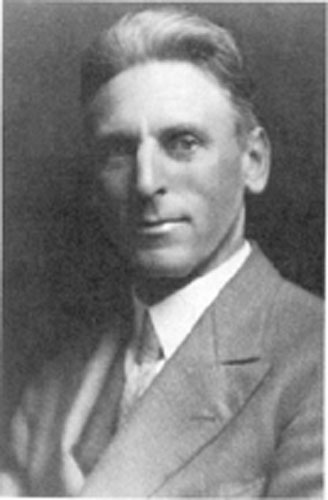
- Born: William Henry Gummer; 7 December 1884; Auckland, New Zealand
- Died: 13 December 1966 (aged 82); Papatoetoe, New Zealand
- Education: Royal Academy of Arts
- Occupation: Architect
- Children: 3
- Awards: NZIA gold medal (1928, 1931)
- Practice: Gummer and Ford
- Buildings: New Zealand National Art Gallery and Dominion Museum; Dilworth Building; Auckland Railway Station; Remuera Public Library; Stoneways
- Projects: National War Memorial; Christchurch Bridge of Remembrance; Dunedin Cenotaph
- Design: Parliament Buildings (1911; 3rd place); Auckland Civic Centre (1924; not built)

William Henry Gummer (7 December 1884 – 13 December 1966) was a New Zealand architect.

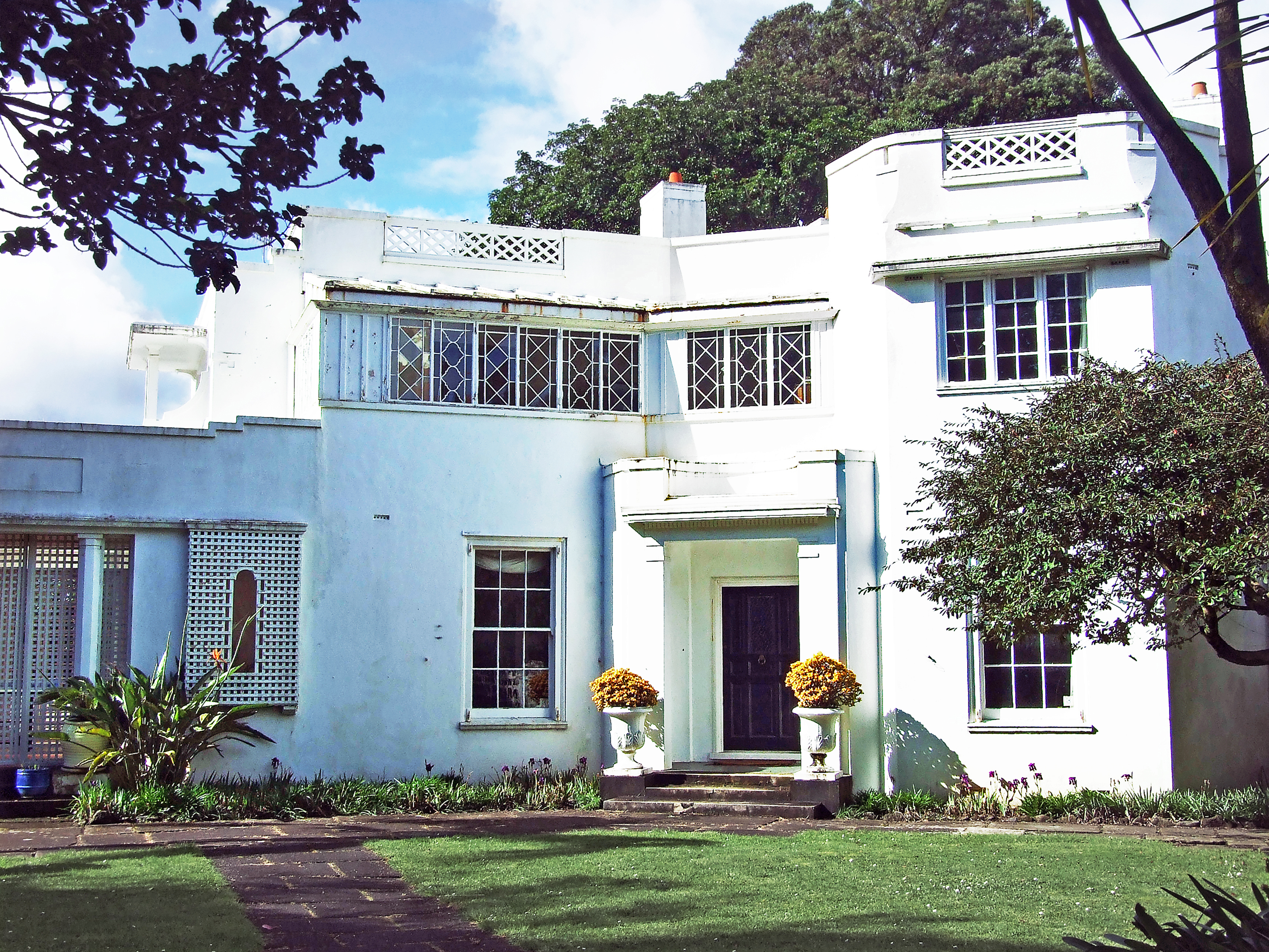
Stoneways was Gummer's private residence

Gummer was born in Auckland, New Zealand, in 1884. He studied architecture at the Royal Academy of Arts from 1909 to 1912; during that time, he worked with Edwin Lutyens in London. After returning to New Zealand he entered a partnership with Wellington-based firm Hoggard and Prouse, creating the firm Hoggard, Prouse and Gummer. He worked in the firm's Auckland office on High Street. Hoggard left the partnership in 1921, leaving Prouse and Gummer in partnership until its dissolution 1923. In 1924 he started the firm Gummer and Ford with Charles Reginald Ford. This new partnership won many architectural competitions around New Zealand.

Many of Gummer's buildings are listed with Heritage New Zealand; often they are classed as Category 1. His own house, Stoneways in Epsom, is also listed as Category 1.

In 1953, Gummer was awarded the Queen Elizabeth II Coronation Medal.
