= Heathcote Helmore =

New Zealand architect (1894–1965)

Heathcote Helmore MBE
- Born: Heathcote George Helmore; 1 May 1894; Rangiora, New Zealand
- Died: 21 May 1965 (aged 71); Christchurch, New Zealand
- Occupation: Architect
- Parent(s): George Helmore; Janet Maud Gray
- Practice: Helmore and Cotterill
- Buildings: Vogel House; Fernside Homestead

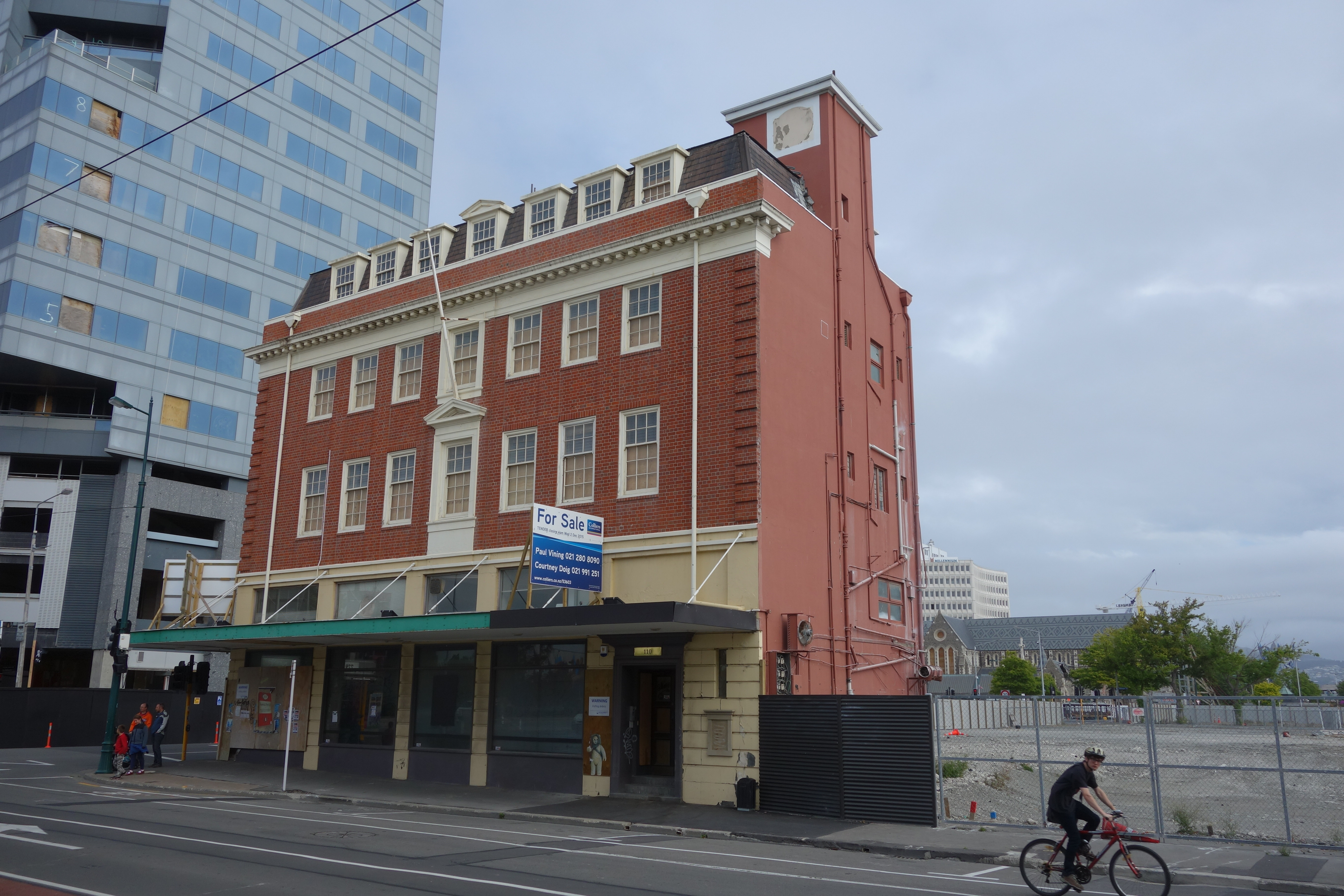
Isaac House designed by Helmore and Cotterill in 1926

Heathcote George Helmore MBE (1 May 1894 – 21 May 1965) was a notable New Zealand architect.

== Early life ==
Helmore was born in Rangiora, New Zealand, in 1894, the eldest child of Christchurch-born solicitor and former national rugby representative George Helmore and his wife Janet Maud Gray. His grandfather, Joseph Helmore, owned Millbrook in Christchurch and Helmores Lane went through the middle of that property, with the name commemorating his grandfather. Like his father, he attended Christ's College. At 17 he was articled to architect Cecil Wood but before his time was complete war broke out and he served four years as wartime aide-de-camp to New Zealand's governor, later governor-general, Lord Liverpool. He was admitted to the New Zealand Institute of Architects in June 1920. In the 1919 King's Birthday Honours, Helmore was appointed a Member of the Order of the British Empire, for services as aide-de-camp to the governor-general.

== Architectural career ==
In mid 1920, Helmore went with Guy Cotterill to London to expand their architectural knowledge and experience by working in the offices of well-known firms including in Helmore's case some time as an assistant to Edwin Lutyens. He returned to Christchurch and set up his personal practice in February 1923 winning some substantial commissions.

=== Helmore and Cotterill ===
In 1924, Helmore went into partnership with Guy Cotterill. Their partnership lasted until Helmore's death in 1965. They designed Isaac House, which was built in 1926 and is registered by Heritage New Zealand as a Category II structure. Helmore designed Victoria Mansions in 1931; the apartment building's construction did not start until 1935, though. He designed the Canterbury Pioneer Women's Memorial at the top of the Bridle Path that goes from Lyttelton to the Heathcote Valley.
