= Hannigan =

Hannigan is an Irish surname. A spelling variant is Hannegan. Notable people with the surname include:

== Hannigan ==
- Alyson Hannigan (born 1974), American actress
- Barbara Hannigan (born 1971), Canadian soprano
- Ben Hannigan (1943–2021), Irish footballer
- Dominic Hannigan (born 1965), Irish politician
- Ed Hannigan (born 1951), American comic book writer and artist
- Ernie Hannigan (1943–2015), Scottish footballer
- George Hannigan (born 1987), Irish Gaelic footballer
- Gord Hannigan (1929–1966), Canadian ice hockey player
- James Hannigan (born 1971), British composer
- James Hannigan (bishop) (1928–1994), Irish-born prelate
- John Hannigan (1938/9–2014), Irish Gaelic footballer
- Johnny Hannigan (1933–2020), Scottish footballer
- Joseph Hannigan (1904–1957), Irish politician and medical practitioner
- Katherine Hannigan (born 1962), American writer
- Lisa Hannigan (born 1981), Irish singer and songwriter
- Pat Hannigan (1936–2007), Canadian ice hockey player and television analyst
- Pat Hannigan (rugby) (1887–1964), New Zealand rugby league footballer
- Patrick Hannigan (born 1982), American soccer player
- Ray Hannigan (1927–2020), Canadian ice hockey player
- Richard Hannigan, Scottish footballer
- Robert Hannigan (born 1965), senior British civil servant and author
- Robyn E. Hannigan, American academic in the field of science
- Steáfán Hannigan, Irish musician, author, composer, audio engineer, musicologist and instrument maker
- Teresa Hannigan, Canadian film and television editor
- Thomas M. Hannigan (1940–2018), American businessman and politician

Fictional characters:

- Miss Agatha Hannigan, fictional character in Annie
- Mimzy Hannigan, fictional character in Hazbin Hotel
- Daniel Hannigan (disambiguation), multiple characters

== Hannegan ==
- Bryan Hannegan, American scientific administrator
- Edward A. Hannegan (1807–1859), American politician from Indiana
- Robert E. Hannegan (1903–1949), American politician from Missouri
- Tom Hannegan (1970–2021), American businessman and politician from Missouri

== See also ==
- Hanagan, surname
- Hanigan, surname
- Hannegan v. Esquire, Inc., 1946 U.S. Supreme Court case
- Hannegan Peak, Washington
- Hannegan caldera, Washington
