= Hinnigan =

Hinnigan is a surname. Notable people with the surname include:

- Joe Hinnigan (born 1955), English footballer
- Michelle Hinnigan (born 1990), English footballer

== See also ==
- Hannigan
