= Manu Tāwhiowhio: Bird Satellite =

Public sculpture in New Zealand

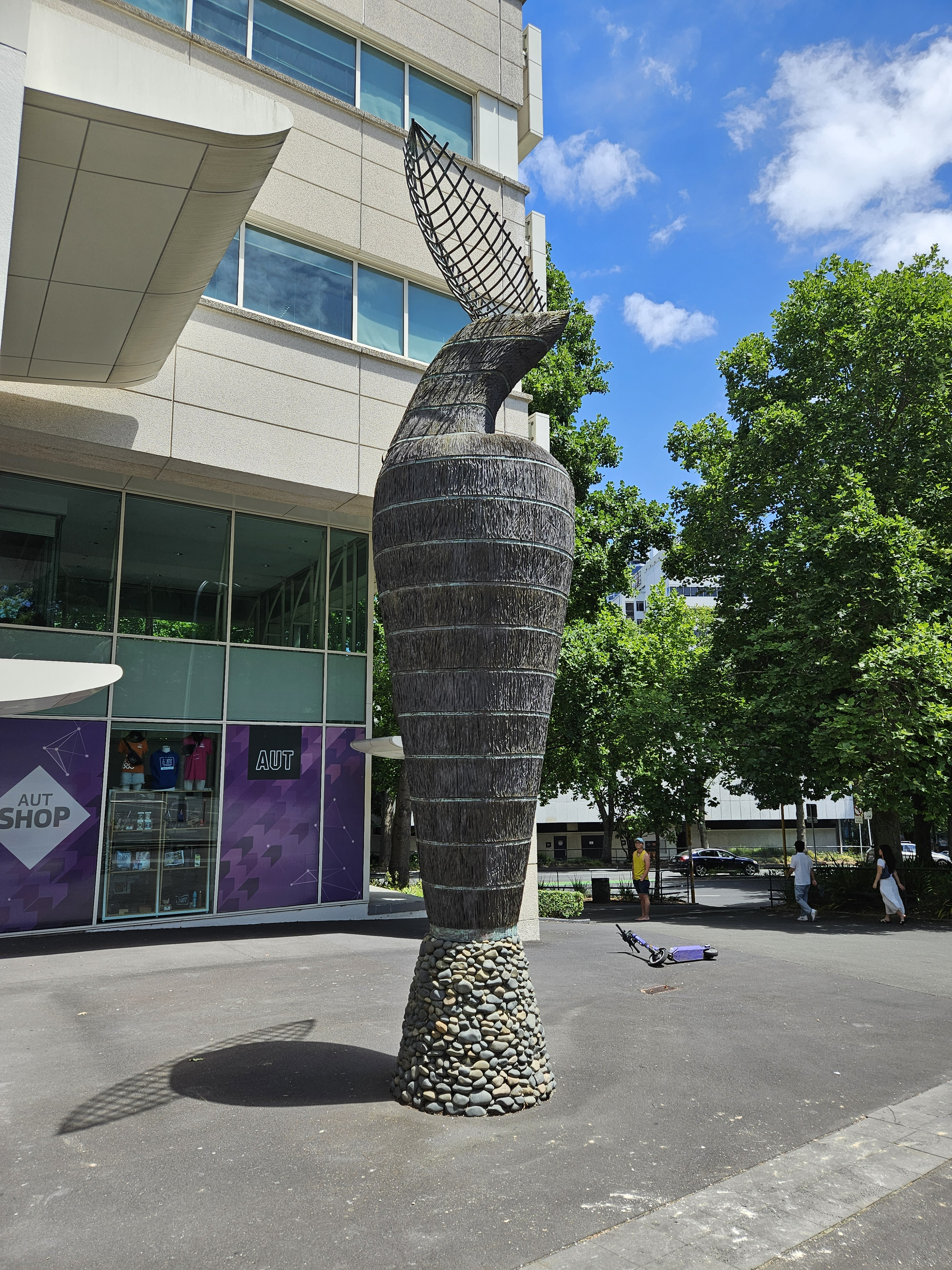
- Manu Tāwhiowhio: Bird Satellite in 2024
- Artist: Brett Graham
- Completion date: 1996
- Medium: Stone, copper and wood
- Dimensions: 7 m × 2.2 m (280 in × 87 in)
- Location: Auckland, New Zealand
- 36°51′08″S 174°45′58″E
- Owner: Auckland University of Technology

Manu Tāwhiowhio: Bird Satellite is a public sculpture located on the corner of Mayoral Drive and Wellesley Street, outside the city campus of Auckland University of Technology in Auckland, New Zealand. The piece was created by New Zealand sculptor Brett Graham in 1996.

== Design ==
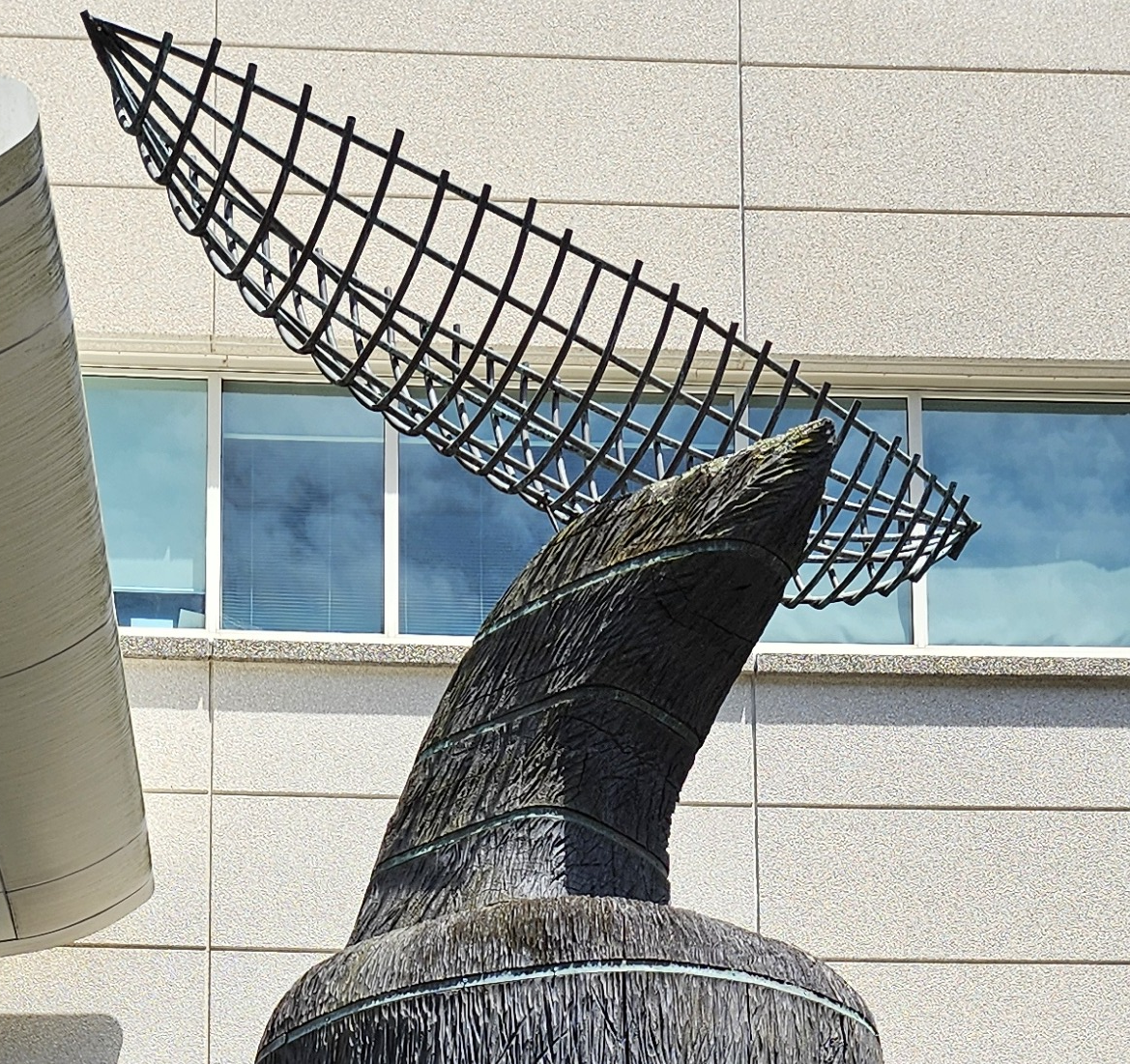
Detail of the bird's head and radio antenna-like features of Manu Tāwhiowhio: Bird Satellite

The sculpture depicts an abstract ovoid migratory bird, divided by copper bands. Graham's inspiration was to create a sculpture that illustrated humanity's connection to the natural environment, as well as humanity's quest for knowledge.

The 7 m (23 ft) tall sculpture incorporates copper, wood and river stones into its design.

== History ==
The sculpture was installed on the corner of Wellesley Street East and Mayoral Drive in 1996.

By the early 2000s, Manu Tāwhiowhio: Bird Satellite had begun being used prominently in marketing materials for the newly established Auckland University of Technology.

== Reception ==
Art historian Michael Dunn interpreted Manu Tāwhiowhio as representing both the importance of migratory birds to Polynesian seafarers, and by incorporating satellite imagery and references, linking this to modern communications. Artist Nathan Pōhio felt that the piece "speaks of how Ancestral sea travellers observed migrating birds to conceive of foreign lands within travelling distance," and linked the piece with Kaitiaki (2004), a large-scale kāhu pōkere (harrier hawk) sculpture located in the Auckland Domain designed by Graham's father Fred Graham, seeing Kaitiaki as metaphorically representing a nurturing father.

Art professor Elizabeth M. Grierson linked the piece to the transition of the Auckland Technical Institute to a formal university, Auckland University of Technology, in the year 2000. She understood the work as representing a fusion between functional edifice and artistic artifice. Grierson saw that the sculpture could be understood variously as "an edifice of empowerment or cultural identity; of the technological new world; or simply of an institution's branding."
