= Bannigan =

Bannigan is a surname. Notable people with the surname include:

- Eugene F. Bannigan (1911–1958), American lawyer and politician
- Stuart Bannigan (born 1992), Scottish footballer

== See also ==
- Hannigan
