= Hanigan =

Hanigan is a surname. Notable people with the surname include:

- John L. Hanigan (1911–1996), American businessman
- Kylie Hanigan (born 1971), Australian sprinter
- Les Hanigan (born 1945), Australian rugby player
- Ryan Hanigan (born 1980), American baseball player

== See also ==
- Hanagan, surname
- Hannigan, surname
