= Brett Graham =

New Zealand sculptor

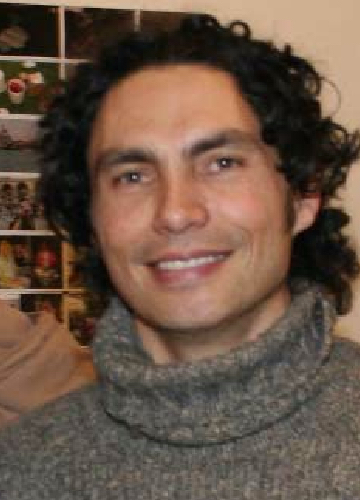
- Graham in 2008
- Born: 1967 (age 58–59); Auckland, New Zealand
- Education: University of Auckland (BFA, 1988), University of Hawaii at Manoa (MFA, 1990), University of Auckland (DocFA, 2003)
- Known for: Sculpture
- Website: brettgraham.co.nz

Brett Graham (born 1967) is a New Zealand sculptor who creates large scale artworks and installations that explore histories of imperialism and global indigenous issues. Graham lives and works in Waiuku on the southern shore of Manukau Harbour in Auckland, New Zealand.

== Education ==
Graham is a Bachelor of Fine Arts (University of Auckland, 1988), a Master of Fine Arts (University of Hawaii at Manoa, 1990) and a Doctor of Fine Arts (University of Auckland, 2003).

== International exhibitions ==
Graham's work was included in the following international exhibitions:

- 2006 – Biennale of Sydney
- 2007 – Venice Biennale
- 2010 – Biennale of Sydney
- 2017 – Honolulu Biennial
- 2024 – Venice Biennale

== Major collections and commissions ==
- Honolulu Museum of Art
- National Gallery of Australia
- National Gallery of Canada
- Auckland Art Gallery Toi o Tāmaki

== Personal life ==
Of Ngāti Korokī Kahukura (Maori tribe) and Pakeha (European) descent, Graham was born in Auckland, New Zealand, where he currently resides. Graham's father was sculptor Fred Graham is also a sculptor, whose work Kaitiaki (2004) is visible from Brett Graham's piece Whaowhia.

== Gallery ==
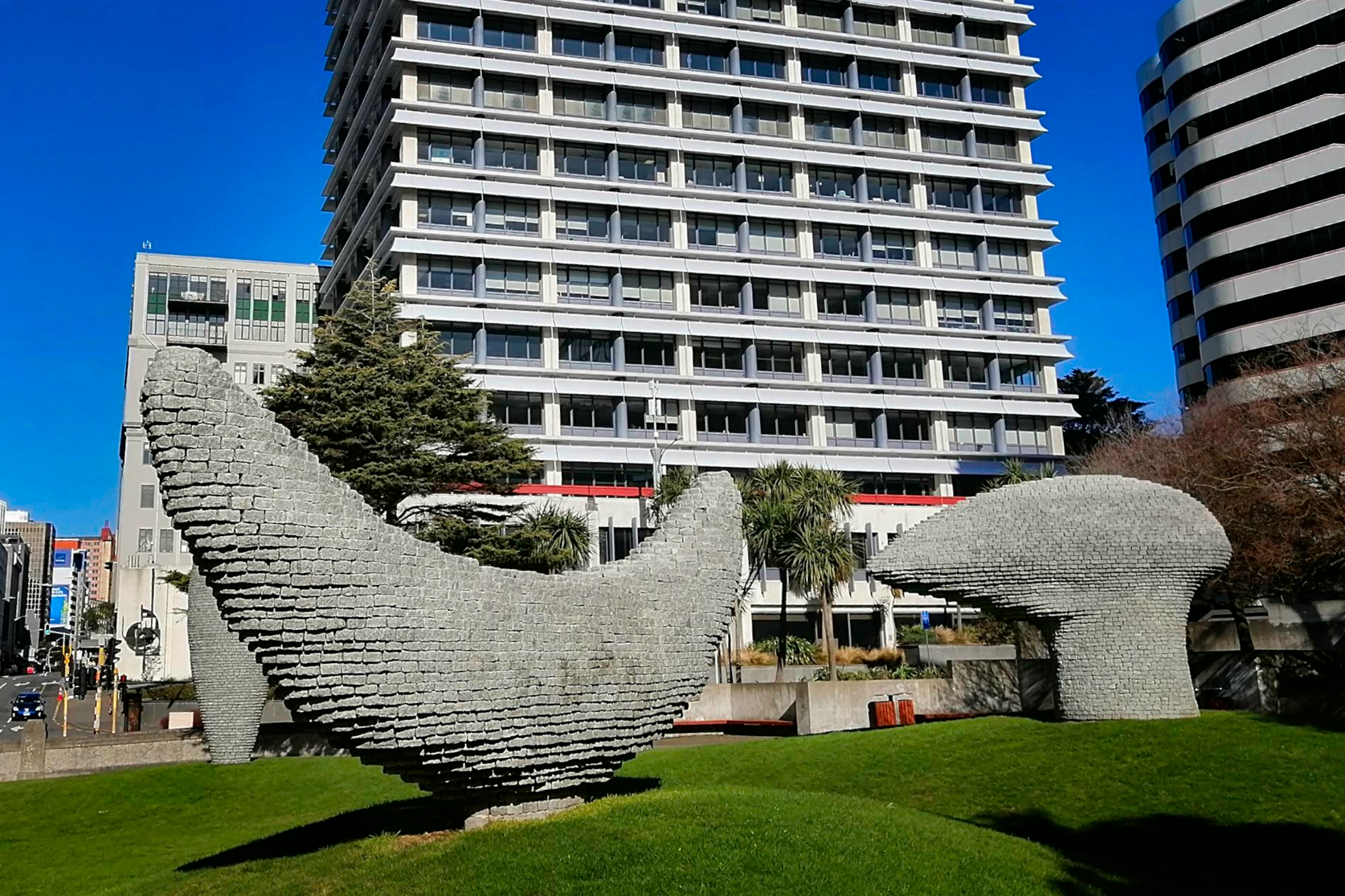
Kaiwhakatere: The Navigator, 2000, at the Parliament precinct, Wellington

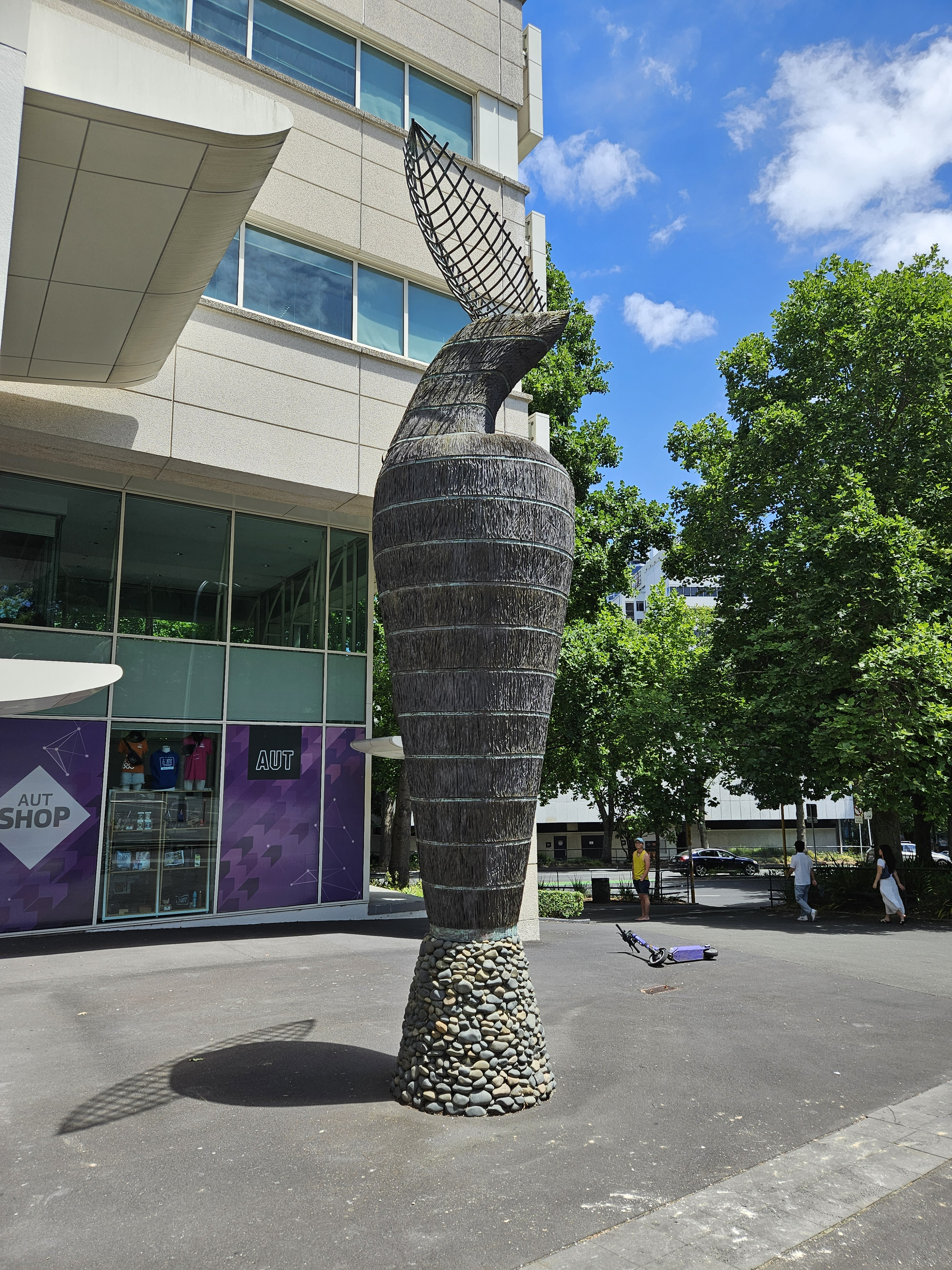
Manu Tāwhiowhio: Bird Satellite, 1996, at Auckland University of Technology

Snitch, 2014, Honolulu Museum of Art

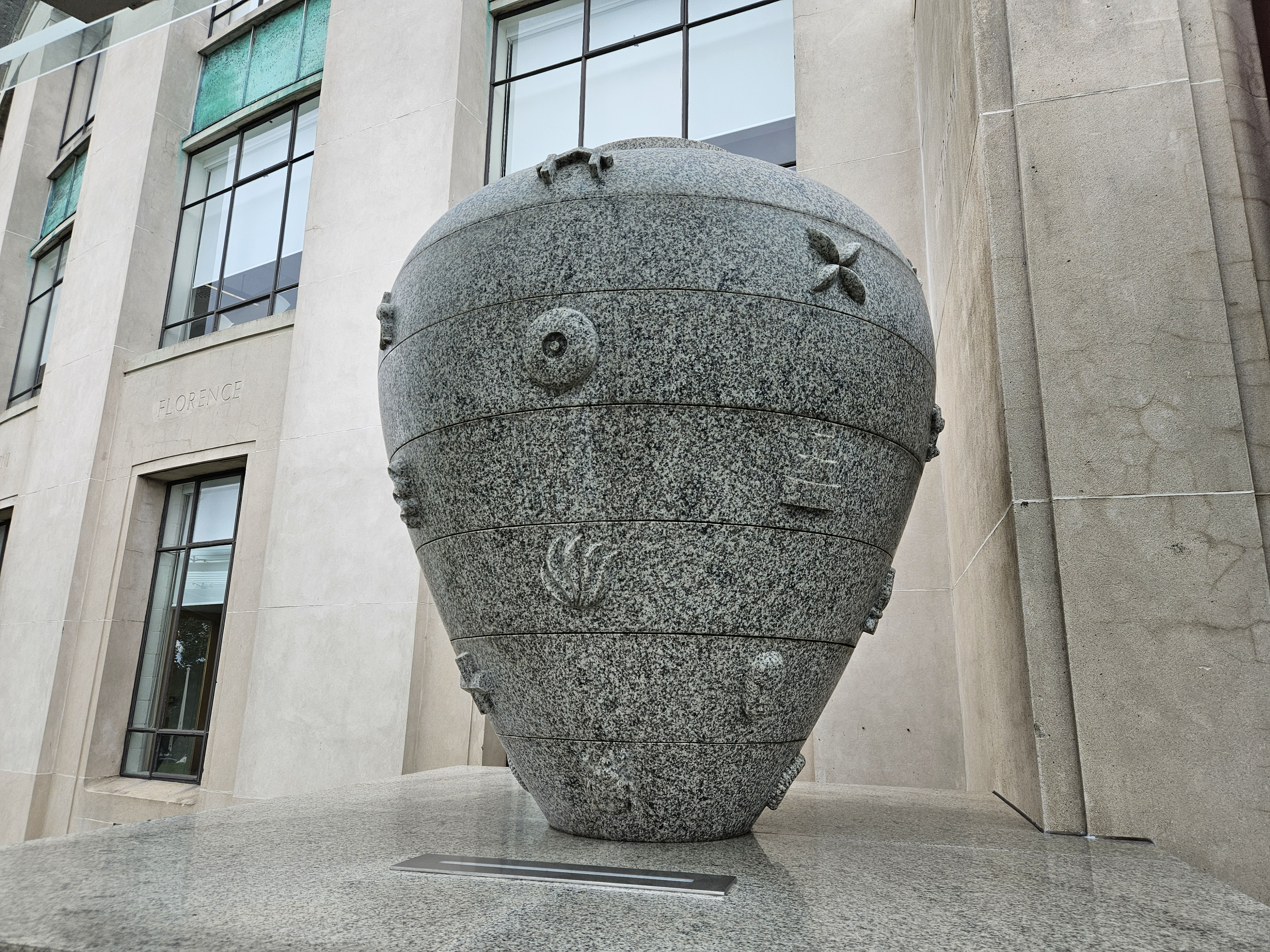
The left Whaowhia sculpture, 2007, at Auckland War Memorial Museum

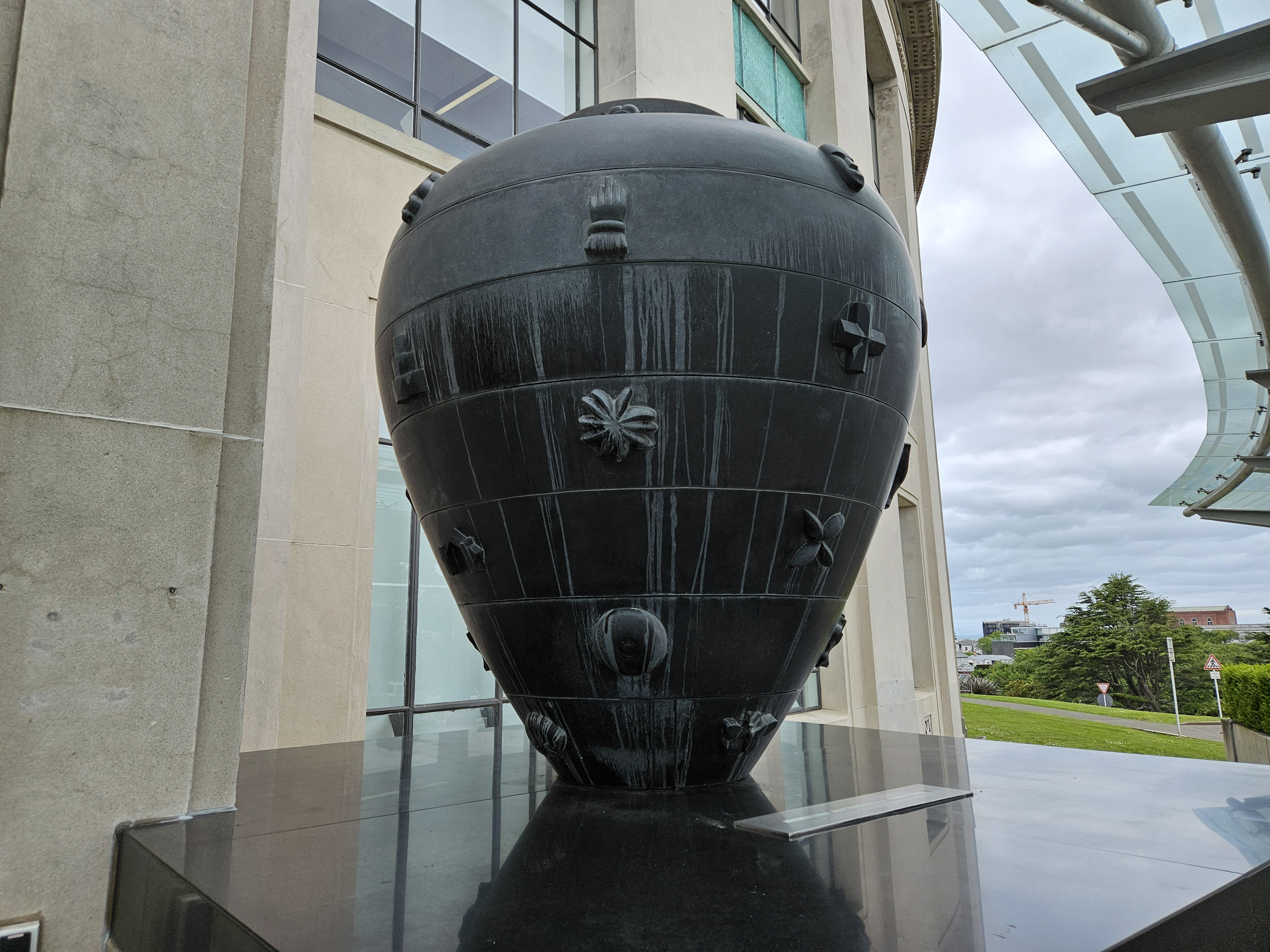
The right Whaowhia sculpture, 2007, at Auckland War Memorial Museum

Te Matariki, 1995, at the University of Waikato Law School
