= Fred Graham (sculptor) =

New Zealand sculptor and educator (1928–2025)

Fred Graham CNZM
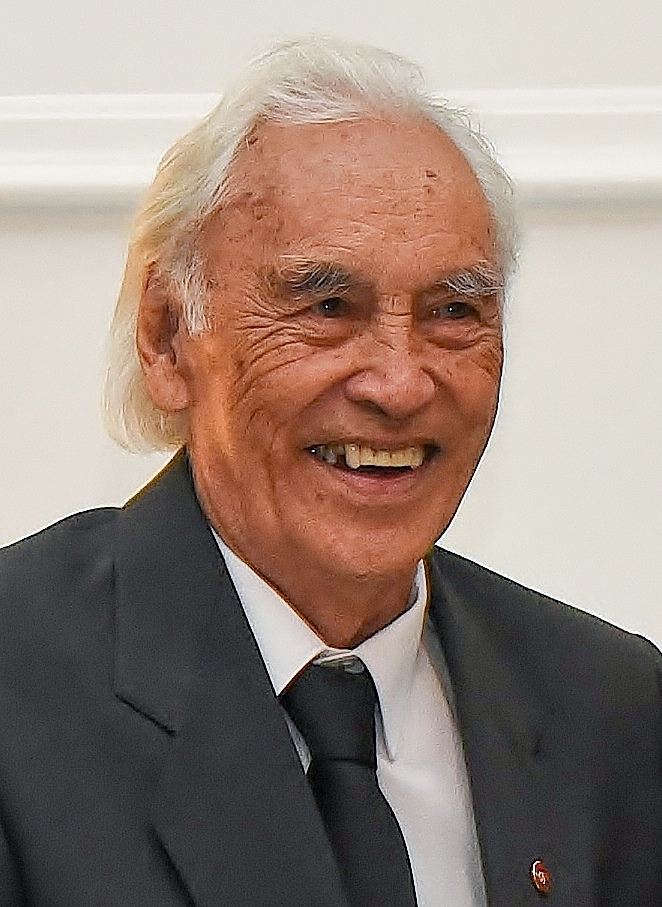
- Graham in 2018
- Born: Frederick John Graham; 1 September 1928; Arapuni, New Zealand
- Died: 9 May 2025 (aged 96)
- Education: Ardmore Teachers' Training College
- Known for: Sculpture
- Relatives: Brett Graham (son)
- Awards: Te Tohu mō Te Arikinui Dame Te Atairangikaahu (2017); Arts Foundation of New Zealand Icon (2018)

Rugby union career
- Position: Wing
Senior career
Years	Team	Apps	(Points)
- North Auckland
- Manawatu
International career
Years	Team	Apps	(Points)
1955	New Zealand Māori	3	

Frederick John Graham CNZM (1 September 1928 – 9 May 2025) was a New Zealand artist and educator recognised as a pioneer in the contemporary Māori art movement. In 2018, Graham was the recipient of an Icon Award from the Arts Foundation of New Zealand, limited to 20 living art-makers. In December 2024, he was appointed a Companion of the New Zealand Order of Merit, for services to Māori art.

== Biography ==
Graham was born on 1 September 1928 in Arapuni in South Waikato. He was affiliated with the Māori iwi Ngāti Korokī Kahukura and Tainui. He trained as a teacher at Dunedin Teacher's Training College and Ardmore Teachers' Training College and specialised in art in his third year. He taught art at schools and in the 1950s he worked as an arts advisor to Māori primary schools in Rotorua and Te Tai Tokerau. One of his students was Nigel Brown, who went on to become a well known New Zealand artist. Graham was also a keen rugby player when he was younger and was briefly in the Māori All Blacks rugby team (he played three games with them).

Graham taught art at Palmerston North Teachers' Training College from 1957 until 1962. He had a studio in Waiuku where he lived with his wife Norma. Graham died on 9 May 2025, at the age of 96.

His son Brett Graham is also a sculptor, known for works such as Manu Tāwhiowhio: Bird Satellite (1996).

== Career ==
Graham is known for his contemporary Māori art sculptures that reflect current themes and draw on Māori traditions. He worked alongside other Māori artists such as Ralph Hotere, Cliff Whiting, and Paratene Matchitt from the late 1950s in founding a contemporary Māori arts movement. He said in an interview on Radio New Zealand:

In the 40s, just after the war, Māori art was traditional art – carving and that kind of thing. But for the first time a lot of Māori had gone to teachers' college and the ideas around that time were changing. As young students, we wanted to follow our own path rather than follow the traditional path.

Graham's work has been exhibited and sold to collectors with both New Zealand and international interest.

== Works ==
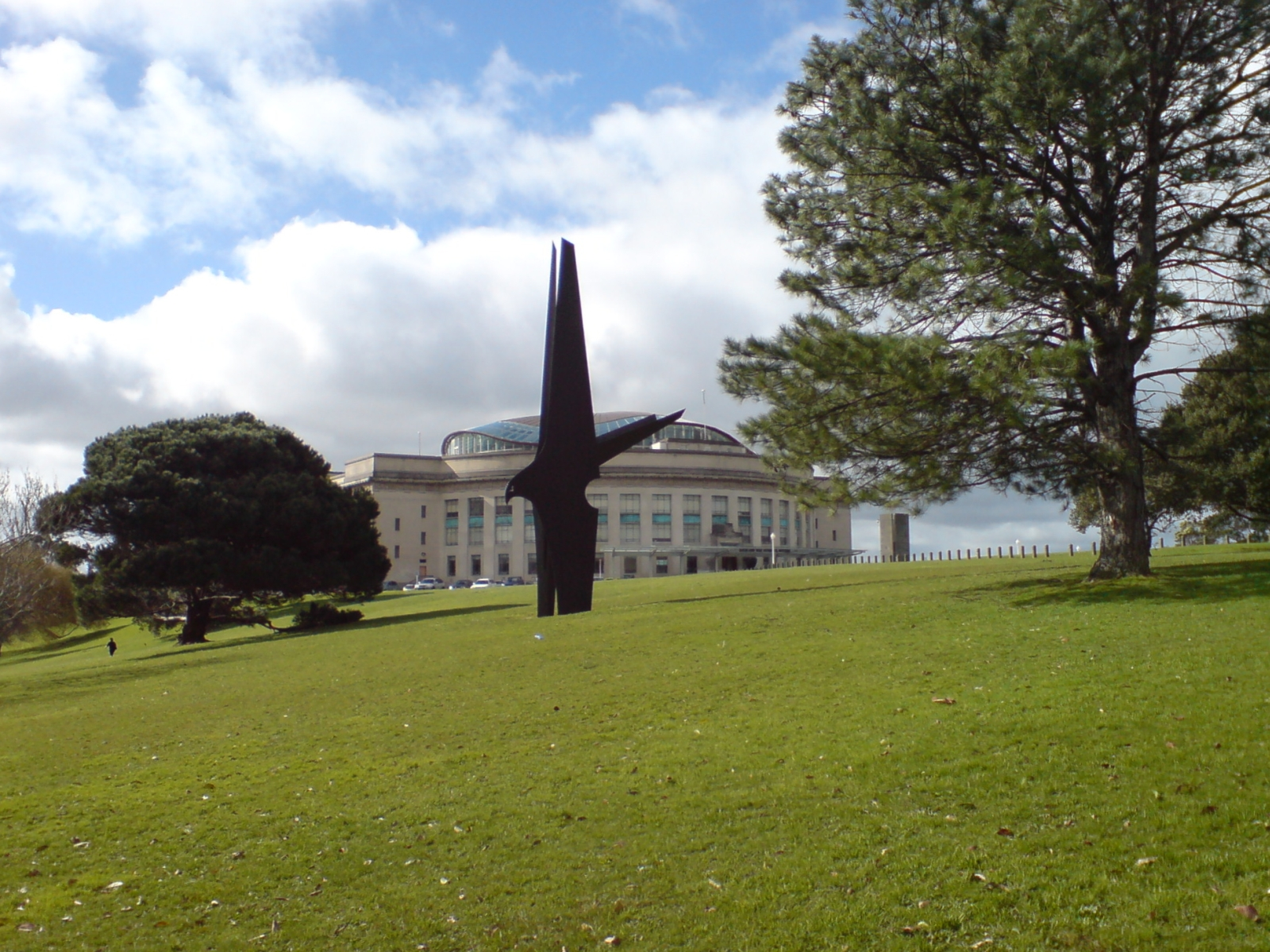
Kaitiaki, Auckland Domain

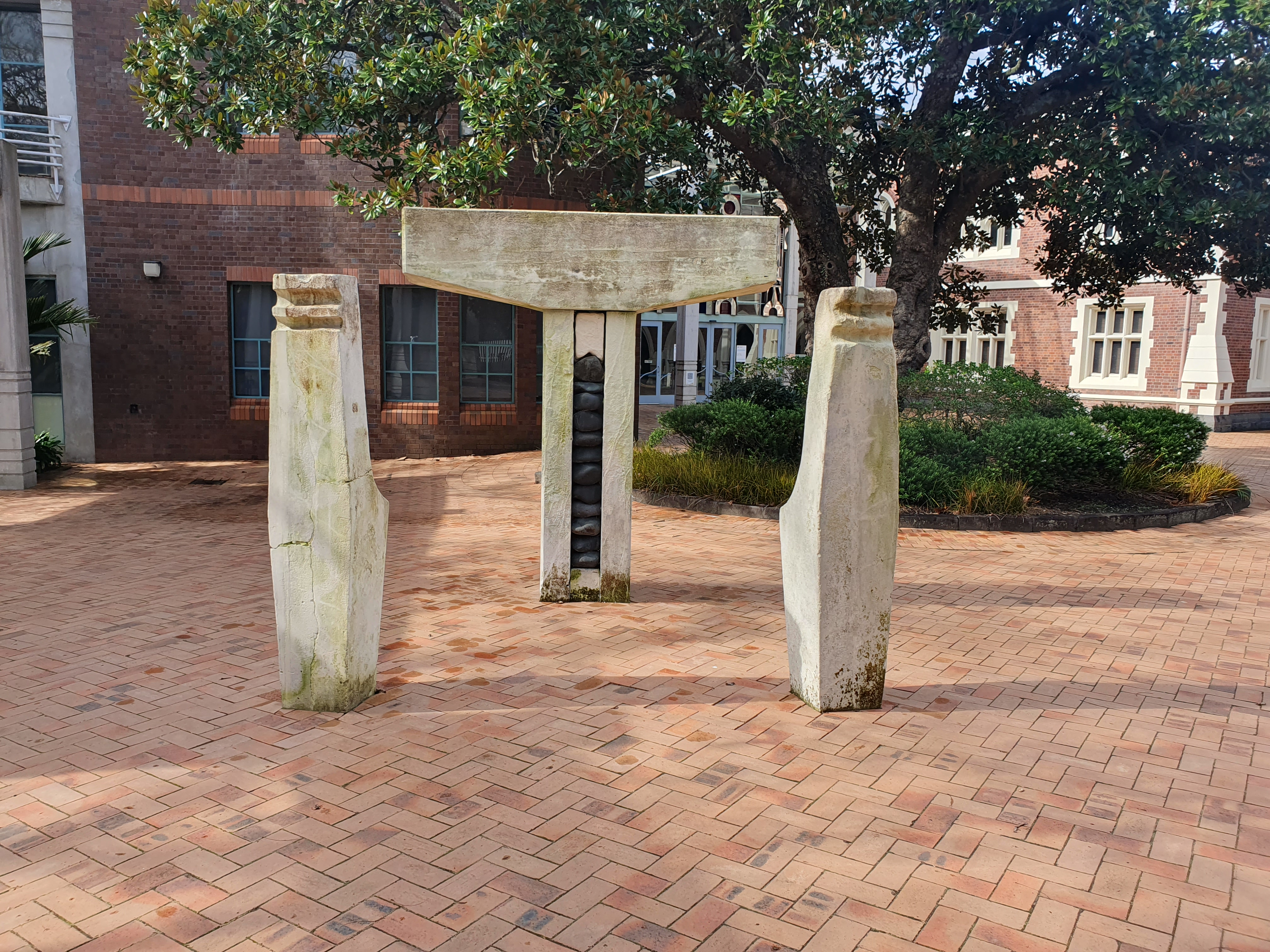
Justice, Auckland High Court

Graham's public sculptures are found in many places throughout New Zealand, including many in Auckland. Bird forms - which could represent people or environmental issues - were often in his work. This is a selection of his public sculptures:

- Justice – courtyard of the High Court at Auckland
- Te Waka Toi o Tamaki – wall outside Auckland Art Gallery
- Kaitiaki – Auckland Domain
- Kaitiaki II – corner of Shortland St and Queen St, Auckland metal bird – Mission Bay, Auckland
- Manu Torino – Auckland Botanic Gardens
- Falling Waters – Palmerston North Conference and Function Centre, formerly the wall of the Alpha Motor Inn in Palmerston North (sold to the city in 2017)
- Waka Maumahara – State Highway 1/State Highway 1C interchange at Horotiu.

== Honours and awards ==
In 2017, Graham was awarded Te Tohu mō Te Arikinui Dame Te Atairangikaahu, the exemplary/supreme award at the Te Waka Toi awards.

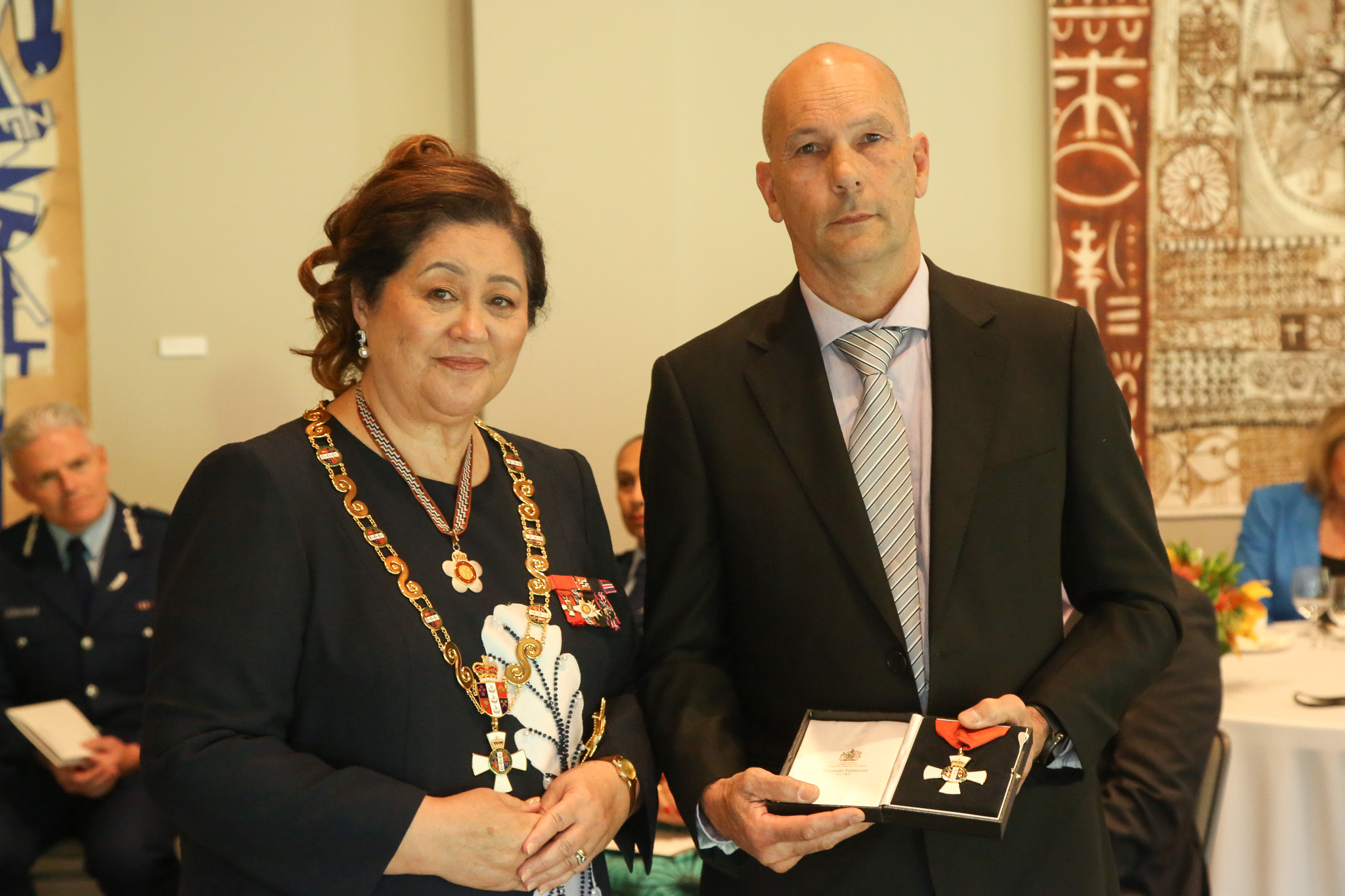
Gary Graham (right) accepts the insignia of Companion of the New Zealand Order of Merit on behalf of his late father from the governor-general, Dame Cindy Kiro, at Government House, Auckland, on 30 September 2025

In the 2018 New Year Honours, Graham was appointed an Officer of the New Zealand Order of Merit, for services to Māori art. Later in 2018, he was named an Arts Foundation Icon. In the 2025 New Year Honours, Graham was promoted to Companion of the New Zealand Order of Merit, for services to Māori art.
