= Hanagan =

Hanagan is a surname. Notable people with the surname include:

- Alonzo Hanagan (1911–1999), American photographer
- Eva Hanagan (1923–2009), British novelist
- Grace Hanagan (1907–1995), Canadian shipwreck survivor
- Paul Hanagan (born 1980), British jockey

== See also ==
- Hanigan, surname
- Hannigan, surname
