= Falling Waters (sculpture) =

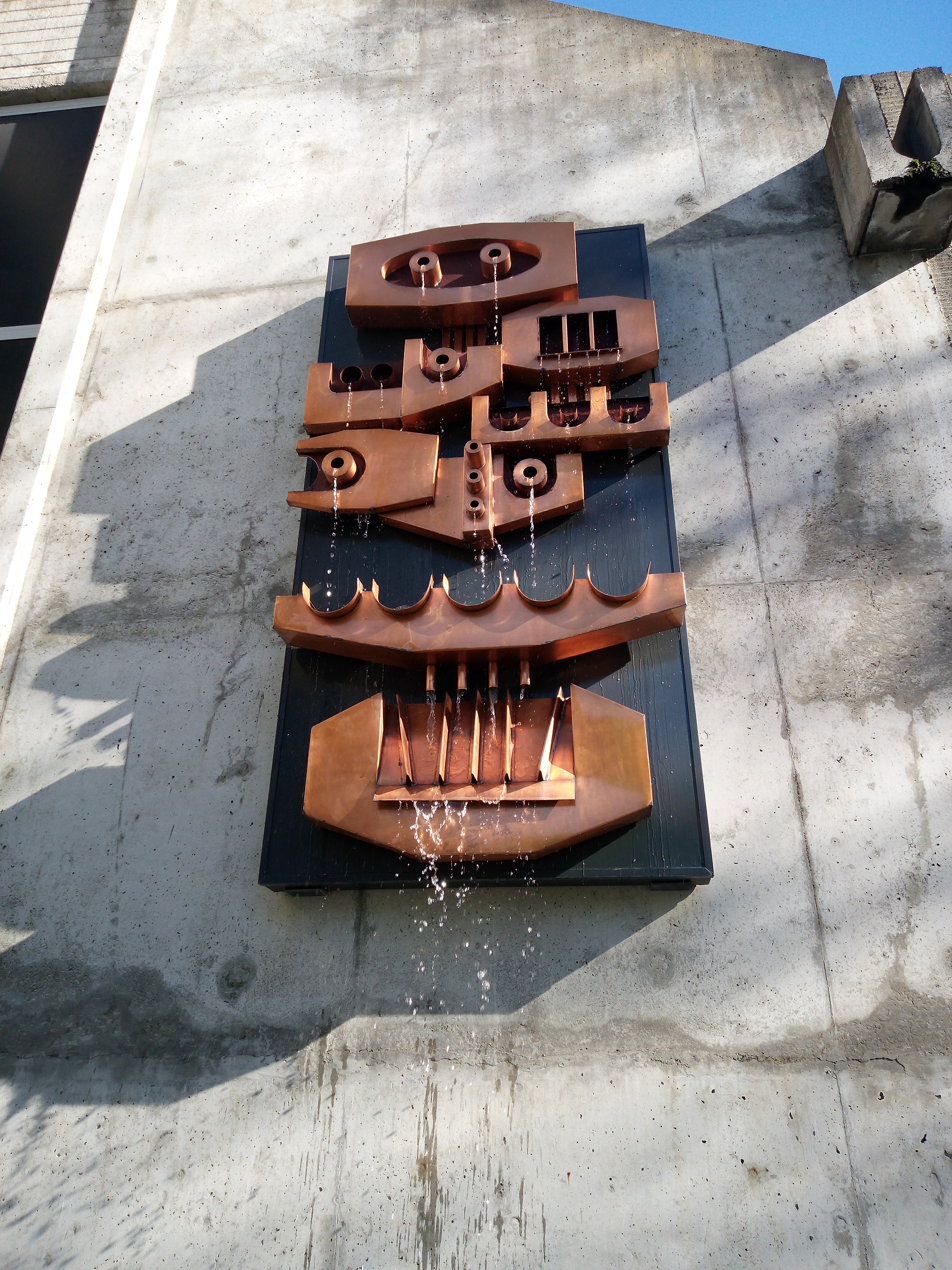
- "Falling Waters" in place on the side of the convention centre, with water flow activated.
- Interactive map of Falling Waters
- Location: Palmerston North, New Zealand
- Coordinates: 40°21′27″S 175°36′32″E
- Designer: Fred Graham
- Material: Copper
- Opening date: 1970

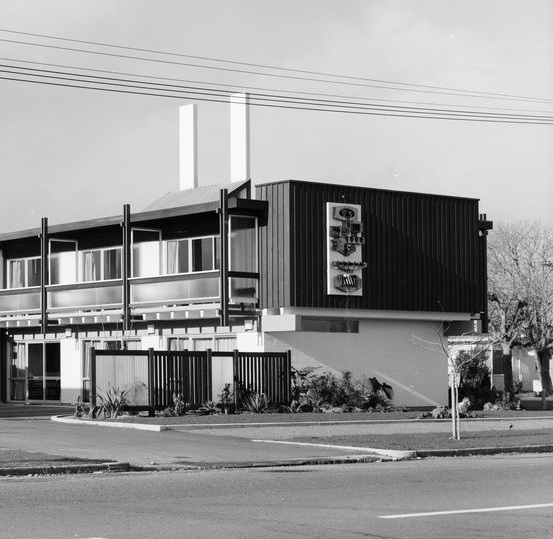
"Falling Waters" on the side of the Alpha Motor Inn, circa 1970

Falling Waters is a copper water sculpture by Fred Graham, located in Palmerston North, New Zealand. The sculpture is designed to run as a continuous water feature. It is currently located on the side of the Palmerston North Convention Centre on Main Street.

The sculpture was commissioned for the Alpha Motor Inn in 1970 by the motel's owners, who were friends with Graham, and it was displayed there for 44 years. It was put into storage when the motel was demolished in early 2015. Following negotiations with the developers, it was purchased by the Palmerston North Public Sculpture trust, Te Manawa Art Society, and Palmerston North City Council in 2017. After several years of restoration it was returned to public display in 2021, on the side of the Palmerston North Convention Centre.
