= Pat Hannigan (rugby) =

NZ international rugby league & union player

Personal information
- Full name: Patrick James Hannigan
- Born: 1887
- Died: 14 April 1964 (aged 77); Karori, Wellington, New Zealand

Playing information

Rugby union
Club
| Years | Team | Pld | T | G | FG | P |
|---|---|---|---|---|---|---|
| 1909–32 | Rival |
Representative
| Years | Team | Pld | T | G | FG | P |
| 1908–09 | Nelson |
| 1908 | Nelson-Marlborough |

Rugby league
- Position: Forward
Club
| Years | Team | Pld | T | G | FG | P |
|---|---|---|---|---|---|---|
| 1910 | Alhambra | 10 |
| 1911–12 | St Mary's Catholic Club | 12 | 2 | | | 6 |
| | Total | 22 | 2 | 0 | 0 | 6 |
Representative
| Years | Team | Pld | T | G | FG | P |
| 1910 | New Zealand | 1 | 0 | 0 | 0 | 0 |
| 1910–12 | Nelson Trial Teams | 4 |
| 1910–13 | Nelson | 9 | 1 | 0 | 0 | 3 |

Patrick James Hannigan was a New Zealand rugby league footballer who played in the 1910s. He played at representative level for New Zealand, and Nelson, as a forward.

== Playing career ==
=== Rugby union career ===
Hannigan played rugby union, for the Nelson-Marlborough combined side against the 1908 Anglo-Wesh touring side. Following his rugby league career Hannigan moved back to rugby. He was a member of the Pikomanu club in the 1920s before transferring back to his old Rival club in 1926. He was still playing in 1930 for Rival and in a match against the Nelson club a spectator remarked "What! is that Pat Hannigan? I played with him 22 years ago". He was still playing in September 1932 when the Nelson Evening Mail reported that "Pat Hannigan, who, though approaching the half century mark, still keeps up with the game in a remarkable manner" after their match with Pirates.

=== Rugby league career ===
In 1910 Hannigan joined the Alhambra club in Nelson. He played 10 matches for them during the season all against the Kaitoa club. In July he was nominated for selection in the New Zealand team along with fellow Nelson player Charles James. He played as a forward in the 20-52 defeat by Great Britain at Domain Cricket Ground, Auckland on Saturday 30 July 1910. Following the test he played in 2 Nelson trial team sides before being selected for the Nelson team to play against Auckland on October 10. The match was played at Trafalgar Park in Nelson and was won by Auckland 24-13.

In 1911 he joined the newly formed St Mary's Catholic Club. He played 8 matches for them against Albion (previously known as Kaitoa). Hannigan played in a Nelson trial match in May and in August he was selected for the 'Northern Tour'. Nelson played 3 matches against Auckland at Victoria Park where they lost 36-12, Taranaki in Eltham, where he scored a try in a 16–8 loss, and Wanganui at Cooks Gardens where they were trounced 40-0.

In 1912 he continued to play for St Mary's. He also played for Nelson against Wanganui and then against Wellington at St Patricks College in Wellington. His only other representative match was for Nelson against Golden Bay on July 27. In 1913 he was named as an emergency player for Nelson in their July 26 match against Golden Bay. There is no further mention of him playing rugby league in the Nelson area after this as the game largely ceased in the area due to the outbreak of World War I.

== Personal life ==
In 1908 he married Mary Ellen Finnigan. They had one daughter, Joan Hannigan on January 20, 1917. Mary died in 1958 while daughter Joan died in 2000.

Pat died on April 14, 1964, and was buried at Karori, Wellington.
