= Red Bull Trolley Grand Prix =

Novelty downhill race

The Red Bull Trolley Grand Prix is a novelty downhill race for unpowered vehicles sponsored by caffeinated drink manufacturer Red Bull. It is held in odd numbered years in the city of Auckland, New Zealand.

The gravity-only powered racers compete on a 700 m downhill racetrack through the Auckland Domain. Vehicles must weigh less than 80 kg, and be no larger than 3 m long by 1.5 m wide by 2 m high. Teams are expected to build trolleys to a theme and must perform a one-minute song/dance/skit before the race commences.

Scores are allocated for originality of concept, speed down the course and quality of performance (including spectacularity of crashes). Races compete in pairs but elapsed time is the only speed criteria considered. Winners were awarded a trip for the whole team to the Melbourne Formula One Grand Prix motor race, or up to NZ$10,000 in other years.

== Event results ==
- 2003
  - Winning Team : Rubber Duck Racing
  - Elapsed Time : 48 Seconds
  - Concept : Bathtub on wheels complete with working shower.
- 2005
  - Winning Team : Wanganui Motors Transformers
  - Elapsed Time : 48 Seconds
  - Concept : Replica Ford Racing Saloon Car.
- 2013
  - Winning Team : Team Zoom Car Wash
  - Elapsed Time : 45.56 Seconds
  - Concept : Fibreglass car.
