= Kaitiaki (sculpture) =

Public sculpture in New Zealand

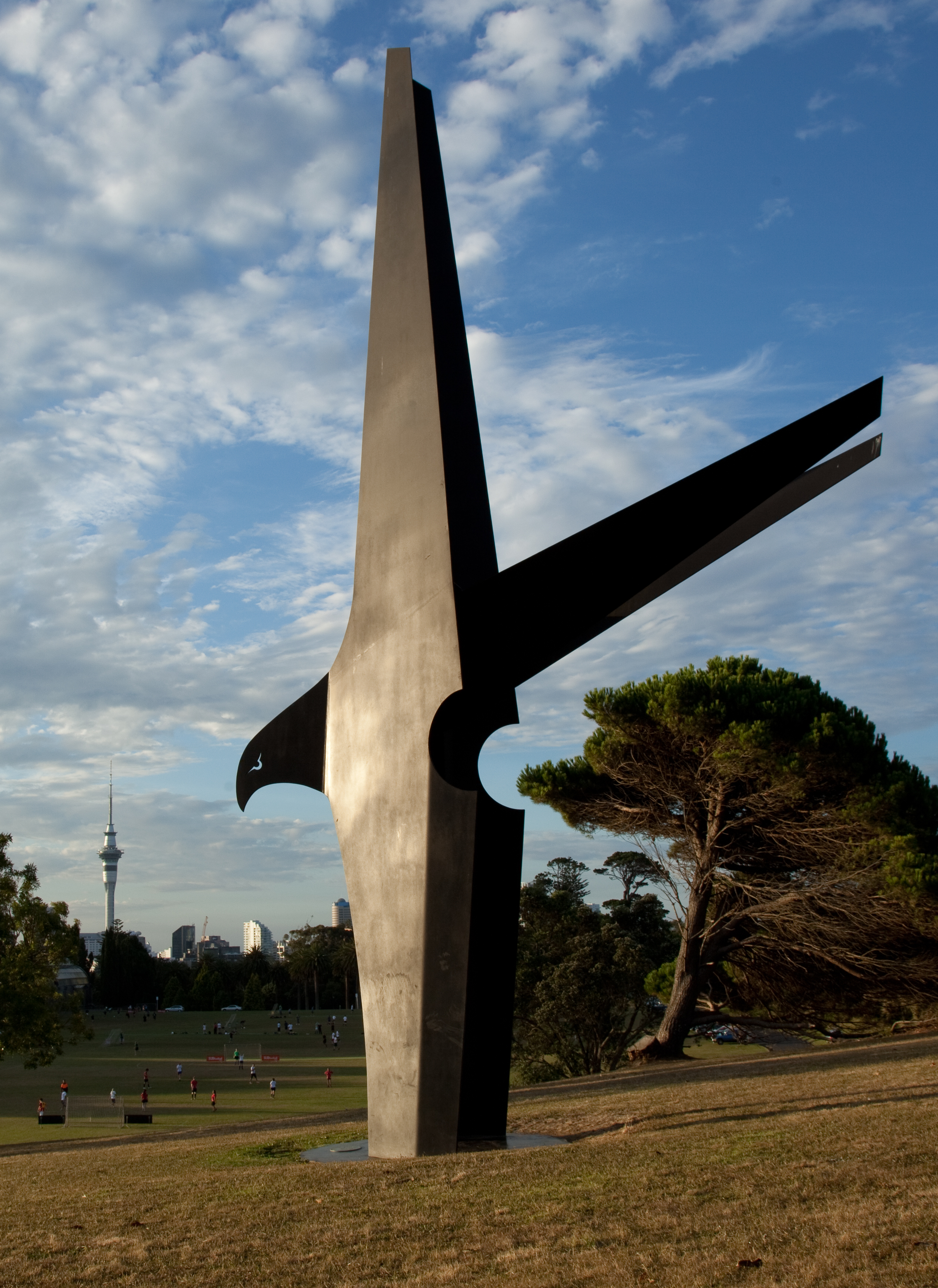
- Kaitiaki in the Auckland Domain
- Artist: Fred Graham
- Completion date: 2004
- Medium: Black powder-coated steel
- Dimensions: 11.805 m × 5 m × 2 m (464.8 in × 200 in × 79 in)
- Location: Auckland, New Zealand
- 36°51′46″S 174°46′35″E
- Owner: Edmiston Trust Collection and Auckland Domain Sculpture Walk
- Website: Edmiston Trust page

Kaitiaki is a public sculpture located in the Auckland Domain in Auckland, New Zealand, created by New Zealand sculptor Fred Graham. The 11.8-metre-tall (39 ft) piece depicts a kāhu pōkere (harrier hawk), a bird that features as a guardian in Ngāti Whātua and Tainui oral histories. Developed as a part of the Auckland Domain Sculpture Walk, the sculpture was unveiled in 2004.

== Commission ==
At the turn of the 21st century, the Outdoor Sculpture 2001 Incorporated Society was formed to develop a sculpture walk through the Auckland Domain. The society installed eight sculptures in the Domain between 2004 and 2005, including Kaitiaki by Fred Graham, who was a member of the society. The piece was commissioned by the society in collaboration with the Edmiston Trust, and supported financially by the New Zealand Lotteries Board Millennium Fund and by the Auckland City Council.

== Design and construction ==
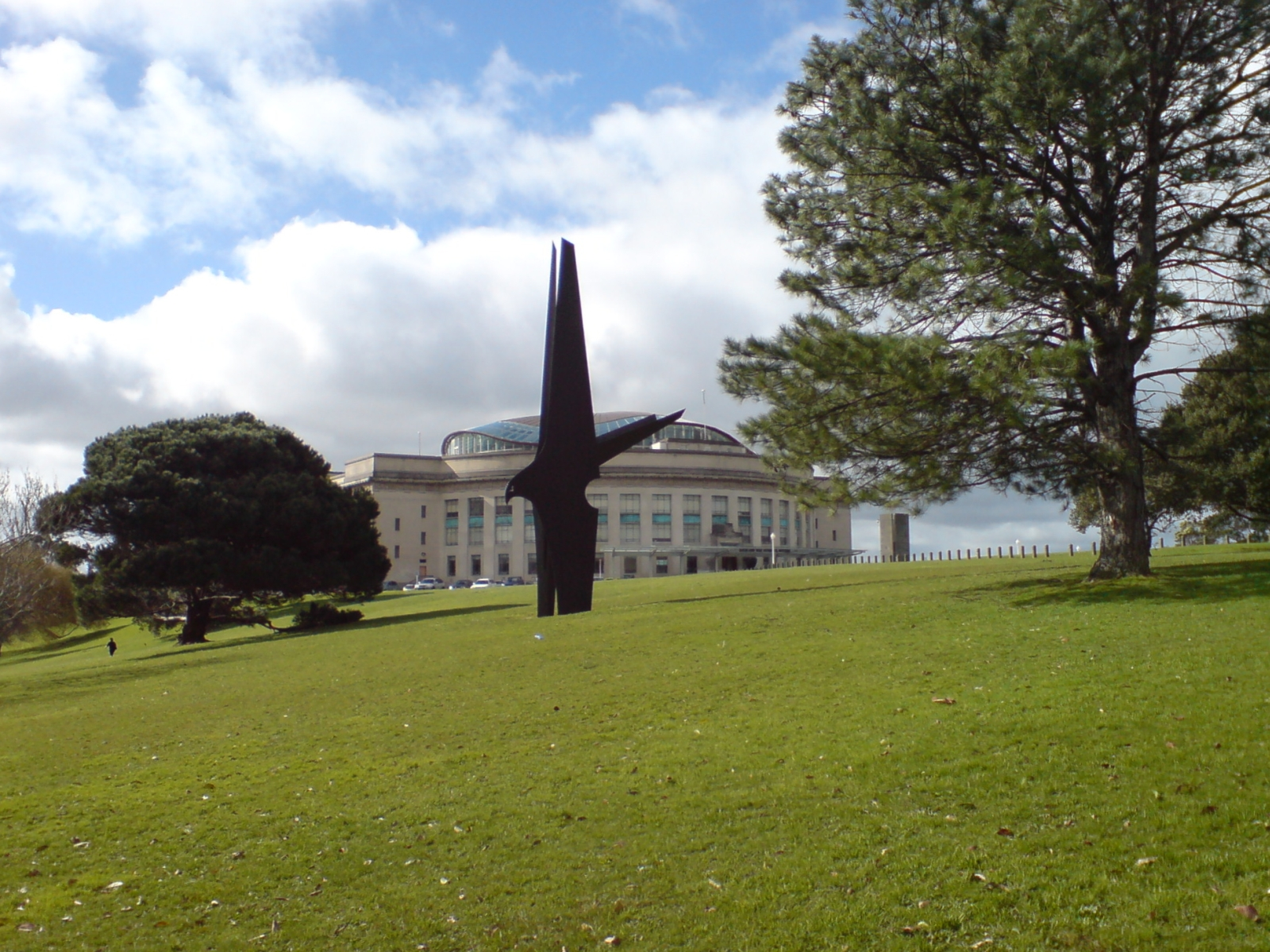
Kaitiaki is located on the volcanic hill Pukekawa in the Auckland Domain, alongside the Auckland War Memorial Museum

Kaitiaki (English: "Guardian") is an 11.8-metre-high (39 ft) black powder-coated steel sculpture that depicts a kāhu pōkere (harrier hawk). Graham chose a kāhu pōkere for the piece due to its appearance in Ngāti Whātua and Tainui oral histories as a guardian that was present in Aotearoa New Zealand prior to the first inhabitants.

The sculpture is located on Pukekawa, one of the two volcanic hills in Auckland Domain, and looks towards the second, Pukekaroa. Pukekaroa was the location where Te Puea Hērangi planted a tōtara tree, to commemorate the centennial of the signing of the Treaty of Waitangi; a location seen as sacred to Graham, who is of Tainui descent.

== History and subsequent works ==
Since the work was unveiled in 2004, the black powder-coated steel surface has often attracted vandalism and tagging.

In 2007, Whaowhia, a sculpture composed of two urns, was installed at the southern entrance of Auckland War Memorial Museum. The piece was created by Graham's son Brett Graham, and Kaitiaki is visible from Whaowhia.

In 2009, Graham created an artwork called Kaitiaki II, located on Queen Street at the location of the original Auckland foreshore, that represents a traditional whatu (anchor stone). In 2022, Graham produced a 4.5-metre (15 ft) reproduction for the Aotearoa Art Fair.

== Reception ==
Artist Nathan Pōhio feels that Kaitiaki "appears as if to emerge from and swoop around the Auckland Domain", and that "the ihi, the energy apparent in Kaitiaki clearly suggests Pukekaroa as a destination as much it suggests protecting the domain itself". Pōhio drew parallels between the work and Manu Tāwhiowhio: Bird Satellite (1996), a large-scale bird sculpture by Graham's son Brett Graham, located outside Auckland University of Technology. Danielle Street, writing for the Central Leader, describes the piece as "enormous [and] towering over the landscape", feeling that it "demonstrates the sense of guardianship that the birds were traditionally known for".
