= Daniel Hannigan =

Daniel Hannigan may refer to:

- Daniel Hannigan, character in A Family Torn Apart
- Daniel Hannigan, character in Annie (1982 film)
