= Johnny Hannigan =

Scottish footballer

Personal information
- Full name: John Leckie Hannigan
- Date of birth: 17 February 1933
- Place of birth: Barrhead, Scotland
- Date of death: December 2020 (aged 87)
- Place of death: Dorset, England
- Height: 5 ft 10 in (1.78 m)
- Position: Winger

Senior career*
Years	Team	Apps	(Gls)
1951–1952	Maryhill Harp		
1952–1955	Morton		
1955–1958	Sunderland	33	(8)
1958–1961	Derby County	72	(19)
1961–1964	Bradford Park Avenue	96	(26)
1964–1968	Weymouth		
1968–1969	Bath City		
- * Club domestic league appearances and goals

John Leckie Hannigan (17 February 1933 – December 2020) was a Scottish professional footballer who played as a winger for Sunderland.
