= Bryan Hannegan =

Bryan J. Hannegan
- Education: University of Oklahoma (Bachelor's in Meteorology); University of California, Irvine (Master's Degree in Aerospace, Mechanical Engineering & Doctorate in Earth System Science)
- Occupations: scientist engineer
- Title: U.S. Department of Energy’s National Renewable Energy Laboratory (laboratory director); Electric Power Research Institute (vice president)

Bryan J. Hannegan is an American scientific administrator, with a background as a climate scientist and engineer. On June 24, 2013, Hannegan became the associate laboratory director for Energy Systems Integration at the U.S. Department of Energy’s National Renewable Energy Laboratory.

He was previously the vice president for environment and renewable energy of the Electric Power Research Institute. From 2008 to 2010, Hannegan was the vice president for environment and generation at EPRI, working on technologies to support fossil-fuel generation. His time at EPRI began in 2006.

Hannegan received his bachelor's in meteorology from the University of Oklahoma, his master's degree in aerospace and mechanical engineering as well as his doctorate in earth system science from the University of California, Irvine. From 1999 to 2003 he was a staff scientist for the United States Senate Committee on Energy and Natural Resources, and is now the C.E.O. of Holy Cross Energy, winner of the SEPA 2020 Electric Cooperative of the Year.

== Bush administration ==
Hannegan served in the George W. Bush administration from 2003 to 2006. He was associate director for energy and transportation at the White House's Council on Environmental Quality from 2003 to 2005, and then became the council's chief of staff from 2005 to 2006. While chief of staff, he also served as acting special assistant to the President for economic policy, helping to develop the Energy Policy Act and Advanced Energy Initiative. During his time in the White House, Hannegan was assistant professorial lecturer in the geography department at George Washington University.
