= Auckland Domain =

Public park in Auckland, New Zealand

Coordinates: 36.859158°S 174.775808°E

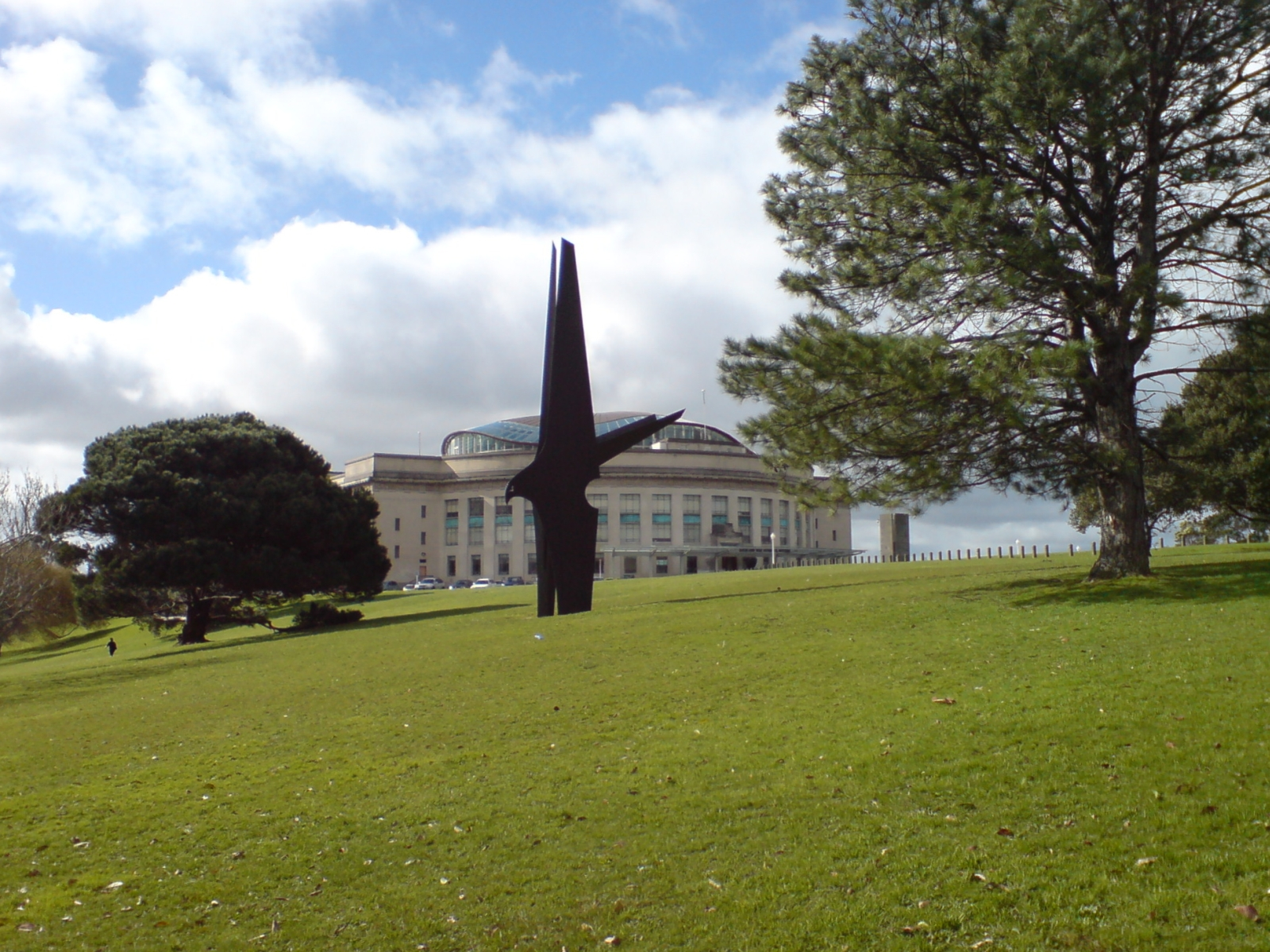
- Sculpture Kaitiaki by Fred Graham in Auckland Domain, with the Auckland Museum behind
- Interactive map of Auckland Domain
- Type: Public park
- Location: Auckland, New Zealand
- Area: 185 acres (75 hectares)
- Created: 1843
- Operator: Auckland Council
- Status: Open year round

The Auckland Domain, also known as Pukekawa / Auckland Domain, is a large park in Auckland, New Zealand. Consisting of 75 hectares (190 acres) of land, Auckland Domain is the oldest park in the city. Located in the central suburb of Grafton, the parkland is the remains of the explosion crater and most of the surrounding tuff ring of the Pukekawa volcano.

The park is home to one of Auckland's main tourist attractions, the Auckland War Memorial Museum, which sits prominently on the crater rim (tuff ring). Several sports fields occupy the floor of the crater and the rim opposite the museum hosts the cricket pavilion and Auckland City Hospital. The Domain Wintergardens, containing two large glass houses, lies on the north side of the central scoria cone called Pukekaroa Hill. A sacred tōtara tree grows on top of Pukekaroa. The fernery has been constructed in an old quarry located in a part of Pukekaroa. The duck ponds lie in the northern sector of the explosion crater, which is breached to the north with a small overflow stream.

Map of Auckland Domain features.
1 Auckland War Memorial Museum
2 Domain Wintergardens
3 Pukekaroa Hill
4 Formal Gardens
5 Duck Pond
6 Sensory Gardens
7 Field

== Naming ==
The site was originally named "Pukekawa" by Māori.

After being reserved by Governor George Grey in 1845, the park became known as "Auckland Domain", or simply "the Domain".

In 2014, the geographic hill between Parnell and Grafton, locally known as "The Domain", was officially named "Pukekawa" as set out in a Treaty of Waitangi Settlement. The place name was changed to reflect the historical association of local Māori with this site. Auckland Council and others call the park by the name "Pukekawa / Auckland Domain".

"Pukekawa" traditionally meant 'sour hill', because the land was considered kawa (meaning sour or bitter) and would not grow kumara. The first Māori King Pōtatau Te Wherowhero interpreted it to mean 'hill of bitter memories', likely referring to various hard-fought tribal battles between the Ngāpuhi and Ngati Whatua iwi. Alternatively, Pukekawa may be a shortening of Pukekawakawa or 'the hill of the kawakawa tree', which are still found in the vicinity.

The central volcanic cone Pukekaroa, also known as Pukekaroro ("Black-backed gull Hill"), has a tōtara tree, commemorating the battles and the continued peace agreement.

== Geography ==
Auckland Domain is the remains of Pukekawa volcano, one of the oldest volcanoes in the Auckland volcanic field, that erupted approximately 100,000 years ago. Pukekawa consists of a large explosion crater surrounded by a tuff ring with a small scoria cone named Pukekaroa Hill in the centre of the crater. Its tuff ring, created by many explosive eruptions, is made of a mixture of volcanic ash, lapilli and fragmented sandstone country rock. Its eruption followed soon (in geological terms) after the neighbouring Grafton Volcano was created, destroying that volcano's eastern parts and burying the rest.

Originally, the crater floor was filled with a lava lake. The western half collapsed slightly and became a freshwater lake, that of which later turned into a swamp and slowly filled up with alluvium and sediment, before being drained by Europeans for use as playing fields and parkland. These origins are still somewhat visible in that the Duck Ponds are freshwater-fed from the drainage of the crater.

== Biodiversity ==
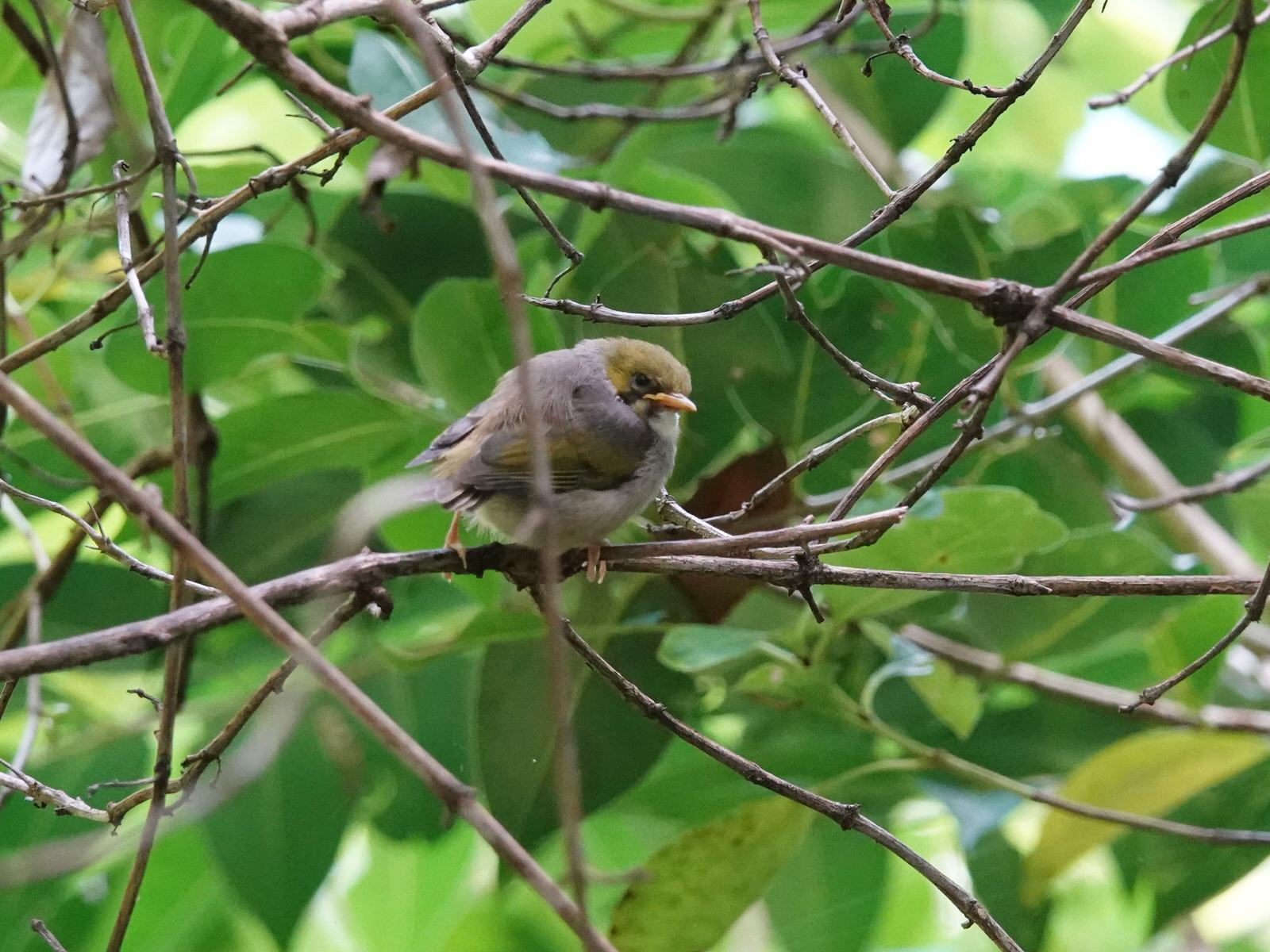
A juvenile silvereye at the Auckland Domain

The park has a mixture of exotic and native forest. Many of the exotic trees, such as pedunculate oak, eastern cottonwood and Norfolk pines were planted in the latter 19th century. Patches of native remnant forest survived primarily in the gullies of the park. The major native canopy species found in Auckland Domain include karaka, pūriri, kauri, rimu, tōtara and tānekaha.

Major bird species found in the park include silvereye, tūī, the New Zealand fantail, grey warbler, and introduced species such as the common blackbird, eastern rosella, Eurasian chaffinch, song thrush and the house sparrow. Between 1987 and 2021, significant increases in forest-adapted endemic bird species have been observed.

The Auckland Domain is the type locality (the place where the first specimen was collected) for several species, including Bocchus thorpei, Spathius thorpei and Trachypepla minuta.

== History ==
=== Māori habitation ===
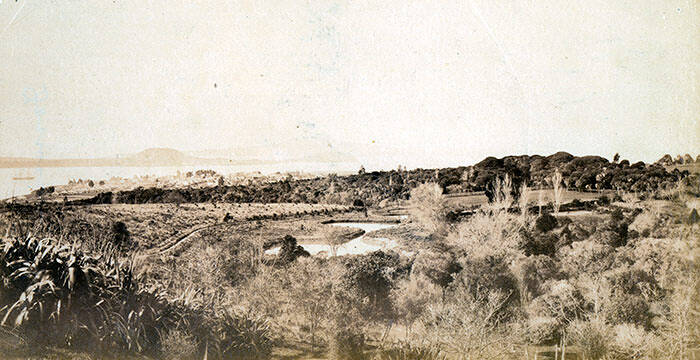
View across Pukekawa to the Waitematā Harbour, Auckland in the 1860s.

Pukekawa was identified by Tāmaki Māori early on as one of the best sites in the isthmus area, with the north-facing side of the volcanic cones well-suited for growing kumara, while Pukekaroa Hill itself was used for storage and as a pā site. The crater swamp meanwhile provided eels and water. In 1828, Pukekaroa was the site of a peacemaking meeting between Northern and Waikato iwi.

Soon after signing the Treaty of Waitangi, Ngāti Whātua Paramount Chief Apihai Te Kawau gifted 3000 acres of land on the Waitematā Harbour for the new capital of Auckland, including Pukekawa. The Domain lands at this time were primarily covered by bracken fern, trees and wetlands.

=== Colonial Auckland ===
The area was set aside as a government-owned recreational space for the newly established town of Auckland in 1840. Governor William Hobson based the design of the area, then known as the Government Domain, on similar recently established parks in Melbourne and Sydney, as multi-purpose area serving as the grounds of Old Government House, a recreational area and a botanical garden. In the early 1840s, ropeworks and a flour mill were established at the northern, non-swampy side of the domain near Mechanics Bay. Joseph Low and William Motion, the owners of the flour mill, diverted the Waipapa River which ran through the Domain for the mill, creating a dam. The flour mill dam was often swum in by the European and Māori inhabitants of Auckland, and an annual "Native Feast" was held to celebrate Queen Victoria's Birthday.

Governor Robert FitzRoy officially designated the Domain as a public park reserve in 1844, naming it "Auckland Park". The Domain was one of the few areas close to the settlement of Auckland with remaining trees, and the proclamation of the Domain as a reserve protected these trees.

Between May and August 1845, Governor FitzRoy built a European-style cottage for Waikato Tainui rangatira Pōtatau Te Wherowhero, as a way to ensure peace and stability in the Auckland Region, in response to hostilities seen at Russell in the north. Te Wherowhero settled at the cottage seasonally, moving between here and other residences gifted to him by Tāmaki Māori iwi. In the late 1840s, Te Wherowhero regularly met with Governor Grey, whom he formed a close working relationship with. Te Wherowhero's brother Kati died at the cottage in 1850, and it became dilapidated by the 1860s.

In 1866, the springs at the Auckland Domain became the first piped source of water for the town of Auckland after the Waihorotiu Stream became unsuitable. The original swamp was drained and turned into a cricket field. This was replaced by the pumpworks at Western Springs in 1877.

From 1879 until 1920, market gardens run by Chinese New Zealanders operated in the Domain grounds.

=== Public domains, the Auckland Exhibition and Museum ===
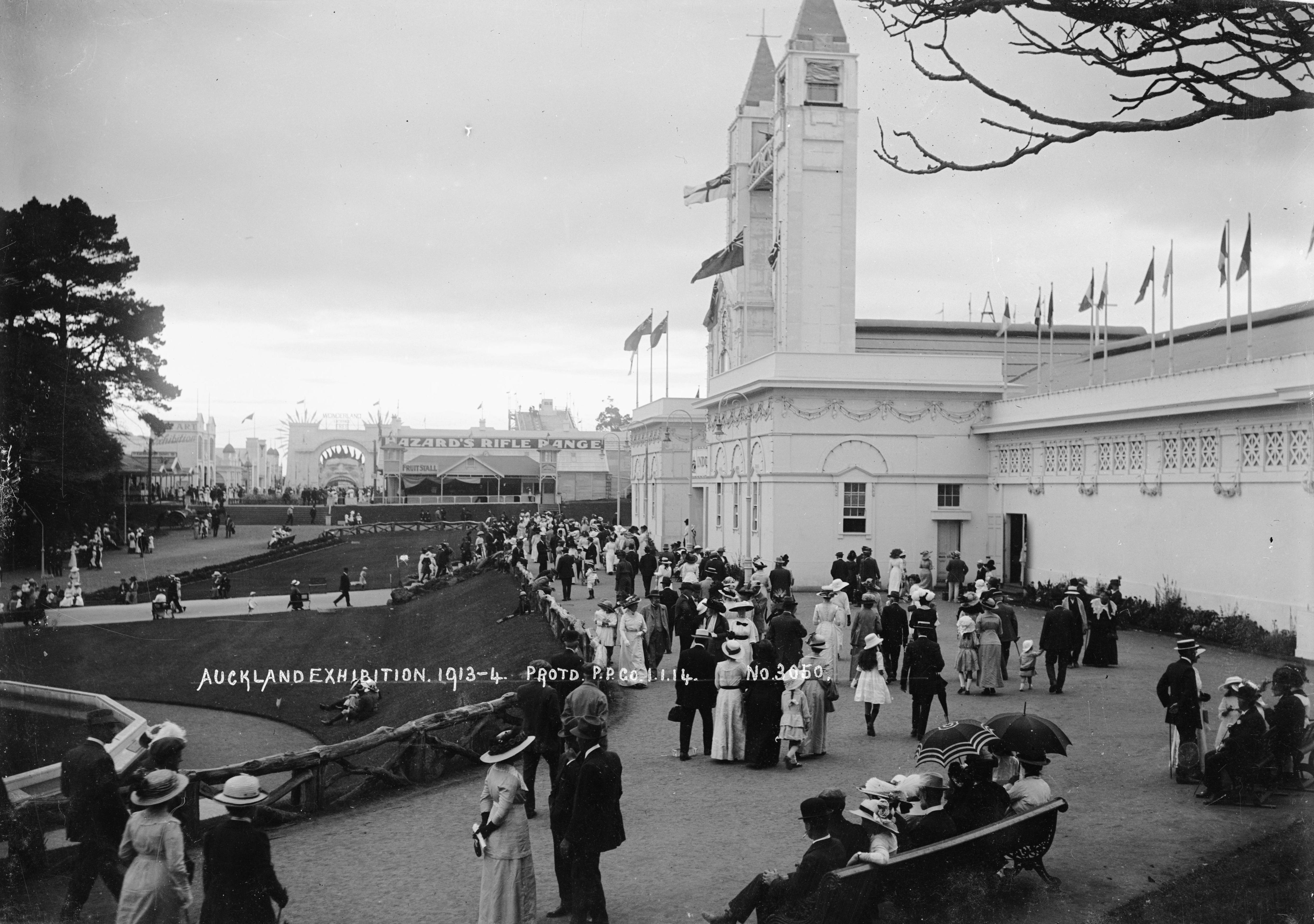
View of the 'Wonderland' with the 'Palace of Industries' at the Auckland Exhibition held in the Domain 1913–1914.

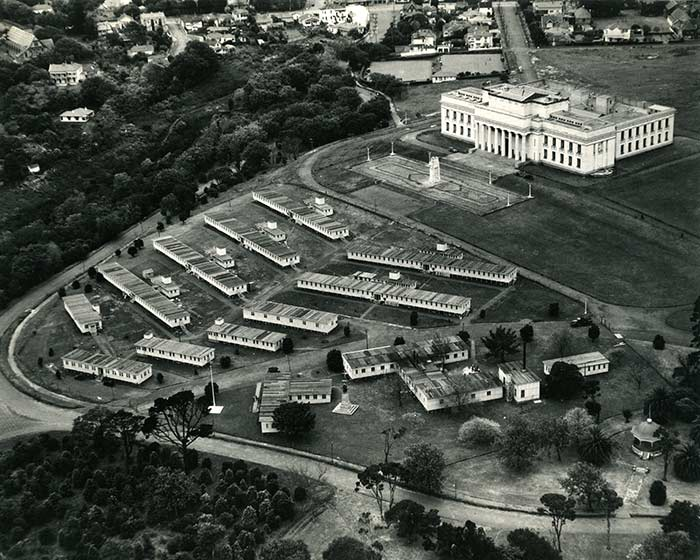
View of Camp Hale in 1943, one of two camps erected in Auckland Domain for US troops in World War II.

The Auckland cricket team played all their home matches at Auckland Domain until 1913, when they moved to Eden Park. The Auckland Acclimatisation Society had their gardens in Auckland Domain in 1862; they became the Auckland Botanic Gardens. Parts of the layout still exist north of the Band Stand, including some greenhouses from the 1870s. Many exotic specimen trees were donated and planted throughout Auckland Domain by the late Victorians which have now matured into a landscape park. They are now augmented by many New Zealand species. The wooden Cricket Ground Pavilion designed by William Anderson was built in 1898 as a replacement for an earlier structure that burnt down. In 1910, Auckland Domain witnessed the first ever rugby league test match in New Zealand when Great Britain defeated New Zealand in the 1910 Great Britain Lions tour.

From 1 December 1913 to 18 April 1914, the Auckland Domain was the site of the Auckland Exhibition, whose president was local businessman William Elliot. The financial return from this event resulted in many improvements to Auckland Domain, chief among them the Wintergardens next to the duck ponds. Unlike many of the other buildings, the Tea Kiosk was intended to remain after the Exhibition closed. Reputedly built in the form of an "ideal home", it is an example of an Arts and Crafts cottage and was designed by architectural partnership Bamford & Pierce. It stands between the Wintergardens and the duck ponds and houses a café and function centre. The Wintergardens Fernery was created in a former scoria quarry on the side of the small Pukekaroa cone.

In 1920, the Chinese market gardens land was offered to the Auckland Rugby League Association for a sports ground and stadium. The garden buildings were removed, and replaced by the Carlaw Park sports stadium.

During the 1920s and 1930s, Elliot donated several of the marble statues as well as money to complete the Wintergarden complex. He provided a further sum of money to construct the art deco entrance gates. Designed by the architectural firm Gummer and Ford, the gates are surmounted by a bronze statue of a nude male athlete by the sculptor Richard Gross. Auckland Domain is also the location of several other public artworks including Guy Nygan's Millennium Tree and Kaitiaki by Fred Graham.

In 1929 the Auckland War Memorial Museum, which was built in a neo-Greek style, was opened. The rear portion was added in the 1960s, with a major renovation and extension in the mid-2000s adding a dome to the south end. The Auckland Cenotaph surrounded by a Court of Honour in front of the museum, is modelled on the 1920 Empire Cenotaph in Whitehall, London, was consecrated by the Archbishop of New Zealand in November 1929.

In 1940 a tōtara tree was planted on top of the central cone Pukekaroa by Kiingitanga leader Princess Te Puea Hērangi, the great-granddaughter of Pōtatau Te Wherowhero to commemorate 100 years of the Treaty of Waitangi. The sacred tōtara is surrounded and protected by carved ancestral guardians of Pukekaroa, which were restored in 2017. Also in 1940, to commemorate the founding of Auckland 100 years earlier, a new road was planned for Auckland Domain. "Centennial Drive" was surveyed and trees were planted along its length, but it was never formed as a road; it is now a walkway between the duck ponds and Stanley Street.

During World War II, two camps were erected in Auckland Domain for 1,726 United States troops, one in front of the Auckland Museum. To the west of the main entrance, a plaque commemorates their presence from 1942 to 1944.

An 18,500 cubic metre (4 million gallon) water reservoir was constructed in 1952, buried in the field at the high point to the immediate south of the museum. The reservoir is still in use maintaining the water supply into Auckland's central business district. In 1970, a sensory garden for the blind was established at the eastern end of Auckland Domain by the Tamaki Lions Club and Council. In 2005, a monument for the Auckland Regiment was installed south of the central cone Pukekaroa.

== Events ==
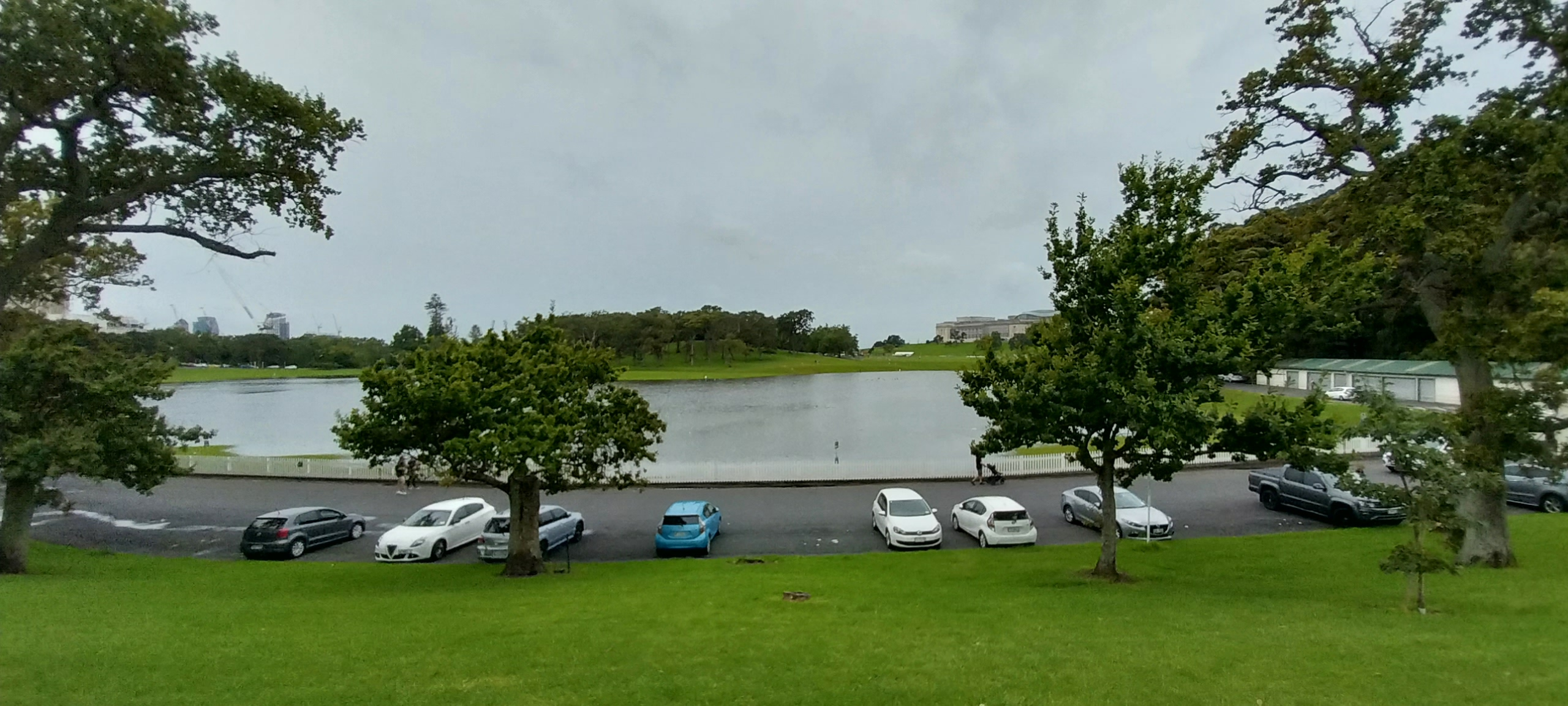
Extreme flooding created a lake in the Pukekawa / Auckland Domain sports fields in 2023.

Auckland Domain has also hosted many of New Zealand's largest outdoor events. Such use has a long history, from balloon ascents during the Edwardian period, to the 1953 Royal Tour of Elizabeth II, to papal visits, and various sports events.

Some of the largest annual events are Christmas in the Park, which in the past has drawn more than 200,000 spectators, and other popular recurring events including the "Symphony under the Stars" and the "Teddybears Picnic".

The War Memorial Museum in the Auckland Domain is the site of the largest annual ANZAC service in Auckland. White crosses erected on the field in front of the War Memorial Museum, commemorate the people that died in the New Zealand Wars and the New Zealand military personnel that died from wars fought overseas (beginning with the South African War).

The Red Bull Trolley Grand Prix was held using Domain Drive as the racecourse from 2003.

During the 2023 Auckland Anniversary Weekend floods, a lake reformed in the lower elevation area of Pukekawa / Auckland Domain that was once a wetland.

== List of public art and memorials ==
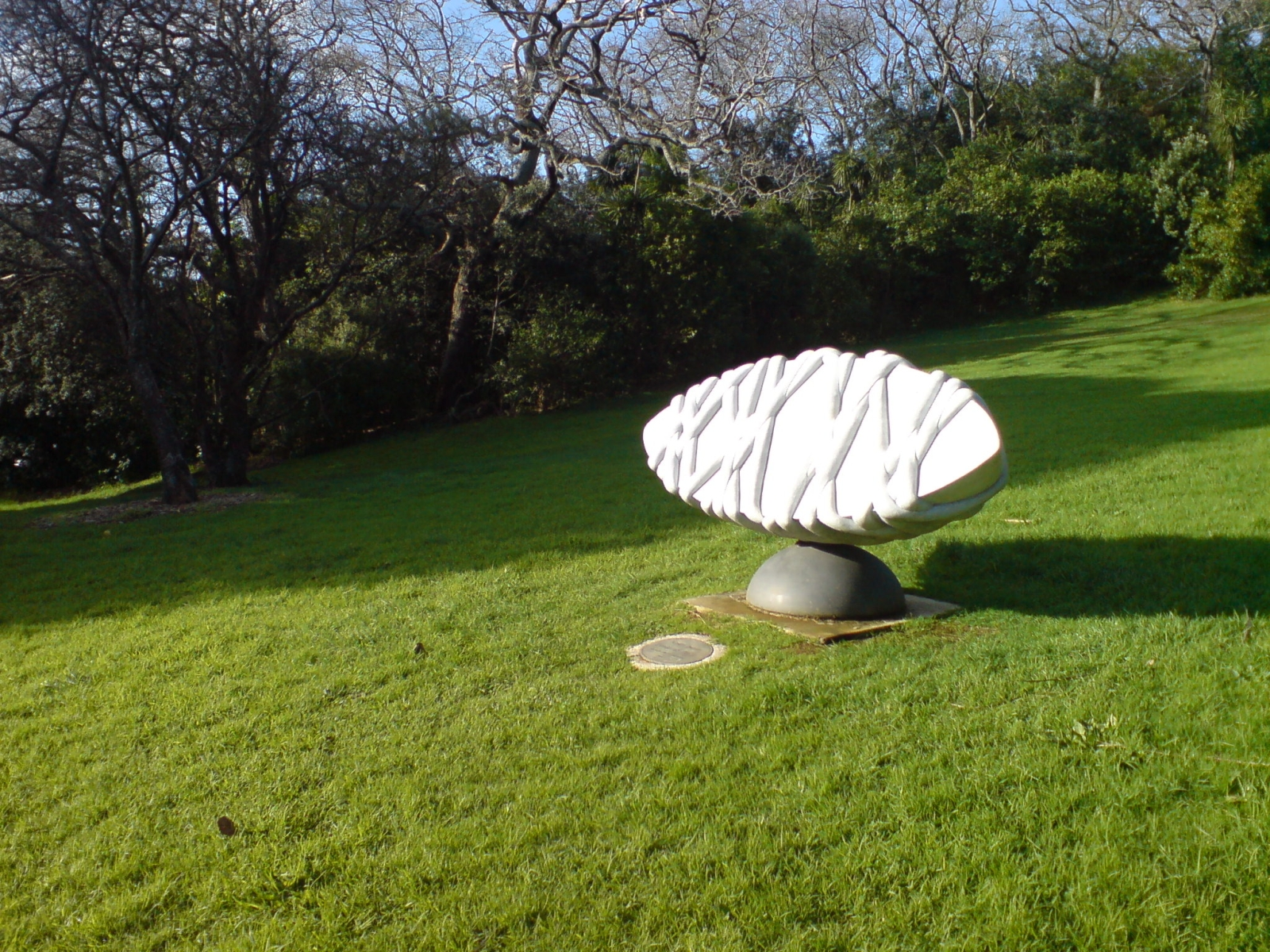
Promise Boat marble and basalt sculpture by Louise Purvis, just off Stanley Street at the lower entrance to the Domain.

- Robert Burns statue (1921)
- Cenotaph (1929)
- Valkyrie fountain statue (1929)
- Four seasons statuary in Wintergarden courtyard (1933)
- Elliot Memorial gates, sculpture by Richard Gross (1935)
- The Three Muses (1955)
- Carving and palisade around tōtara tree (1942)
- Spine by Peter Nichols (1986)
- Arc by Charlotte Fisher (2004)
- Graftings by Greer Twiss (2004)
- Kaitiaki by Fred Graham (2004)
- Spring by Christine Hellyar (2004)
- Transformer by John Edgar (2004)
- Auckland Regiment monument (2005)
- Millenium Tree by Guy Ngan (2005)
- Numbers are the Language of Nature by Chiara Corbelletto (2005)
- Promise Boat by Louise Purvis (2005)
- Regeneration by Neil Miller (2005)
- War Memorial water feature (2010)

== List of buildings ==
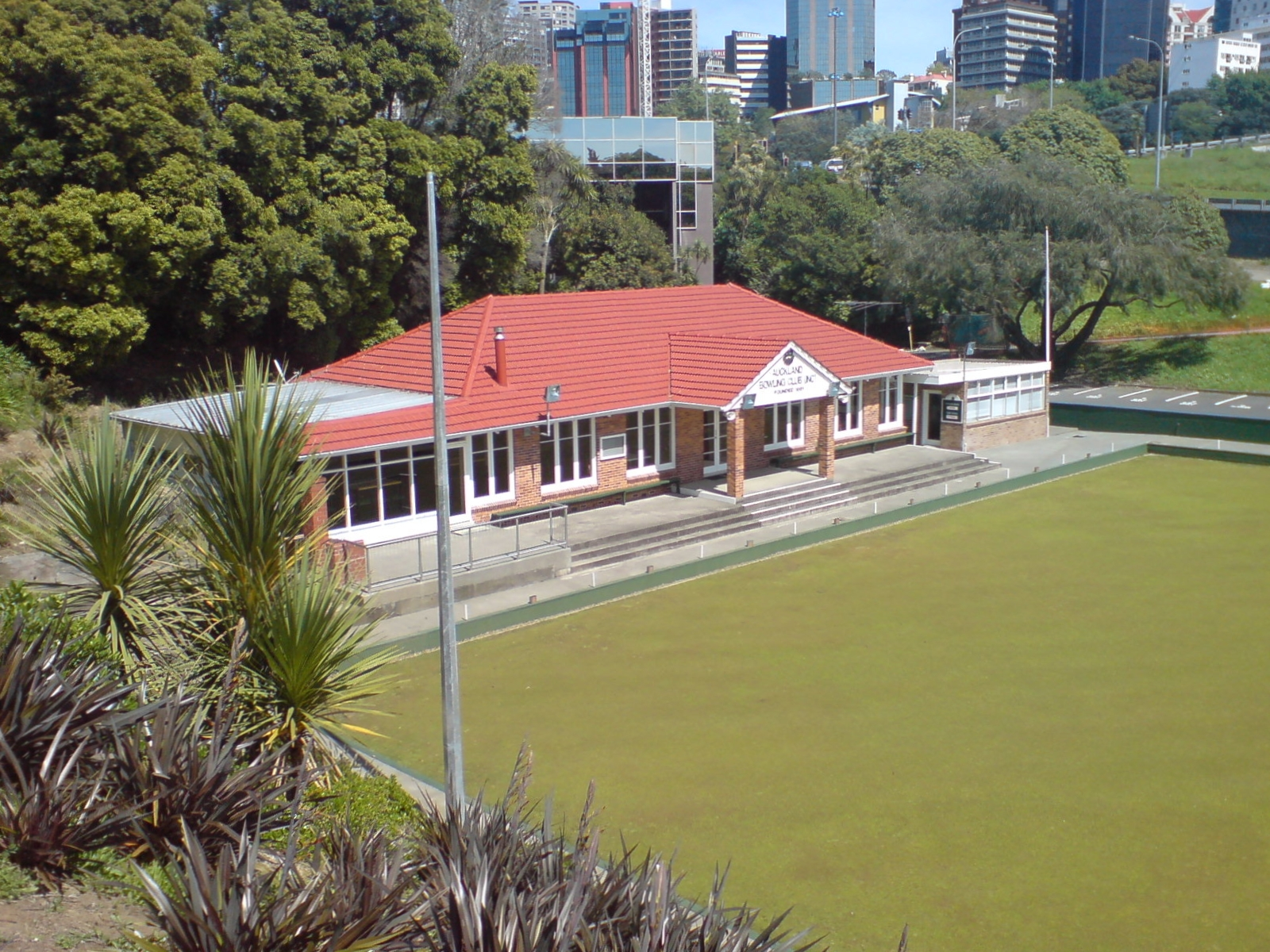
The building and grounds of the Auckland Bowling Club on Stanley Street.

- Auckland Bowling Club (established 1861)
- Parnell Lawn Tennis Club (established 1872)
- Cricket Grounds Pavilion (1898)
- Park Depot & Greenhouses (nursery established 1906)
- Band Rotunda (1912)
- Wintergarden Pavilion, including Tea Kiosk (1913)
- Wintergarden Temperate / Cool House (1921)
- ASB Tennis Centre (Auckland Lawn Tennis Association established 1922)
- Auckland War Memorial Museum (1925–1929, 1955–1960)
- Wintergarden Tropical / Hot House (1928)
- Fernery (1930)
- Camp Hale Building & Sheds (1942–1944)
- Pergola (1970)
- Changing Rooms
- Kari Street Nursery
- Toilets

== Gallery ==
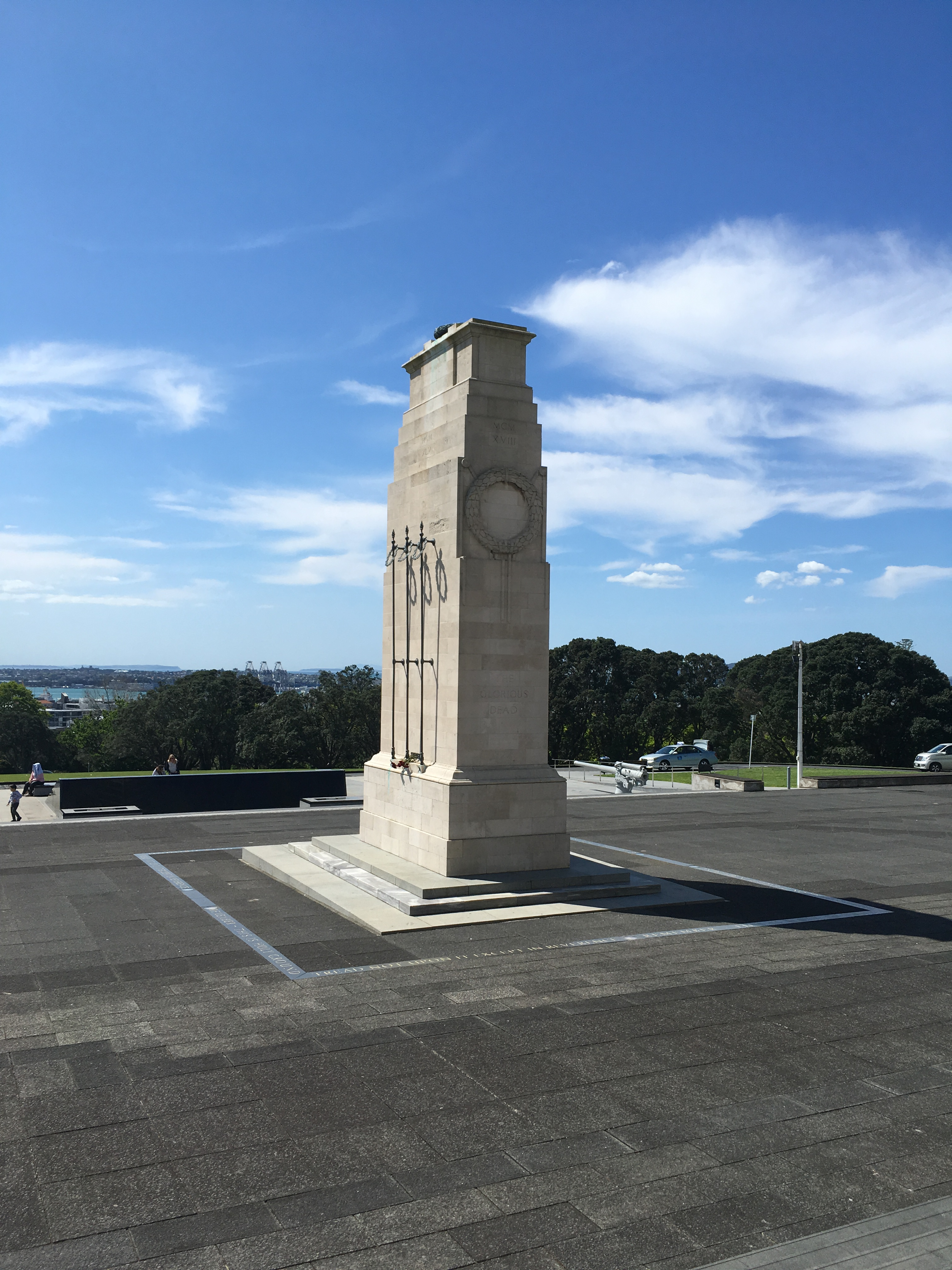
The Auckland Cenotaph and Court of Honour (1929) commemorates those who fell in the First & Second World Wars.

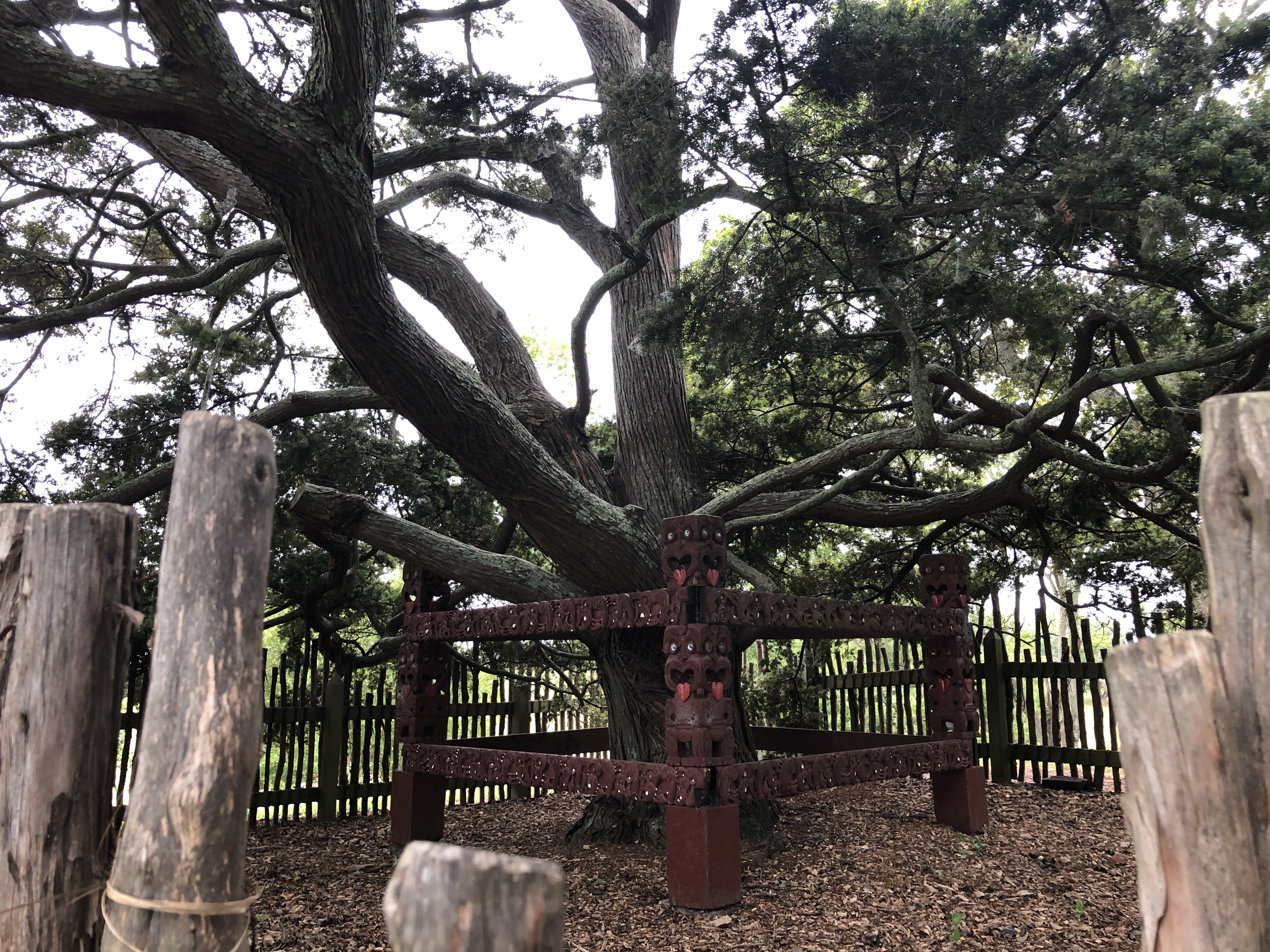
The sacred tōtara tree, planted in 1940 to commemorate 100 years of the Treaty of Waitangi grows on top of the central cone Pukekaroa.

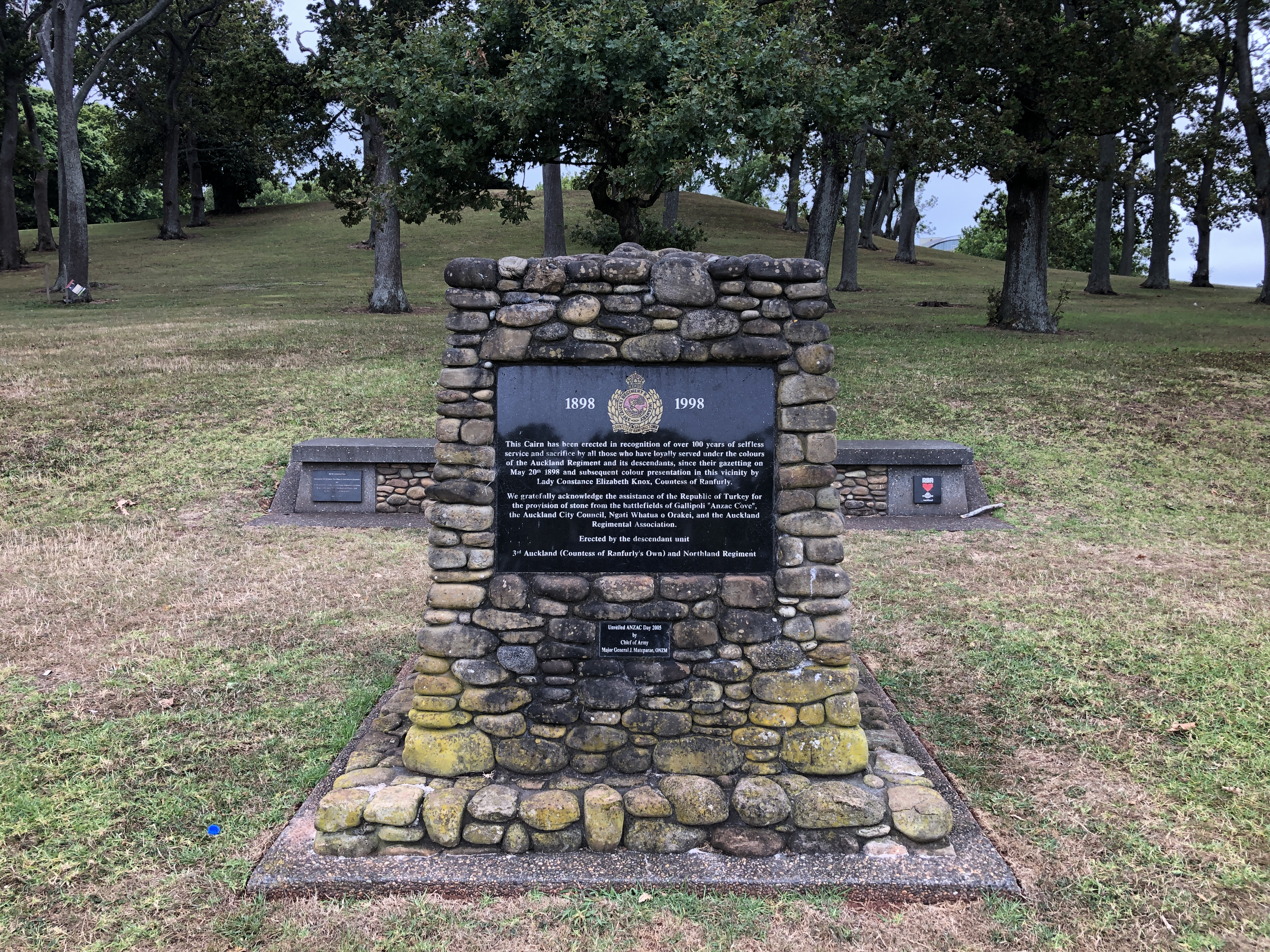
The cairn, installed in 2005 to commemorate the Auckland Regiment to the south of the central cone Pukekaroa.

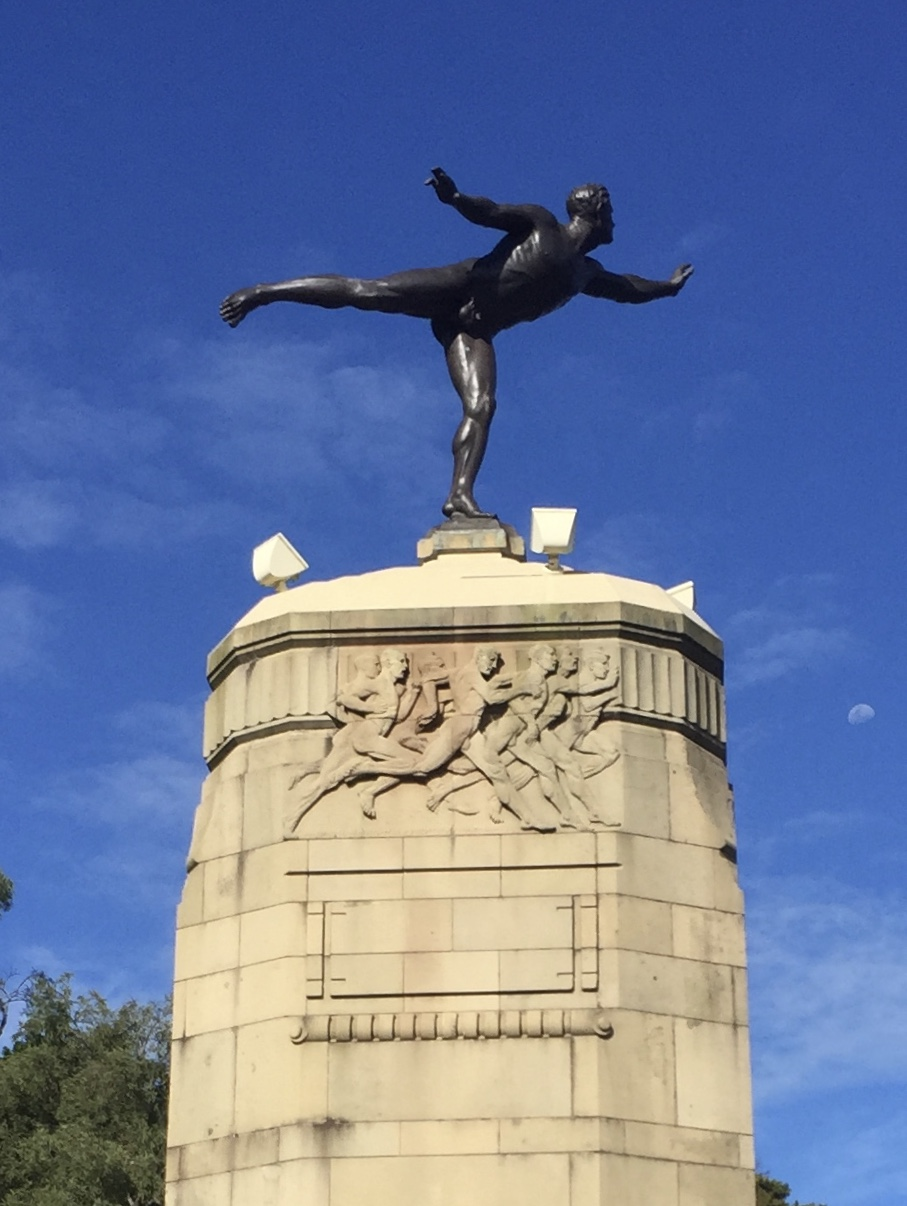
Sculpture of an athlete by Richard Gross (1935) at the Elliot Memorial gates.

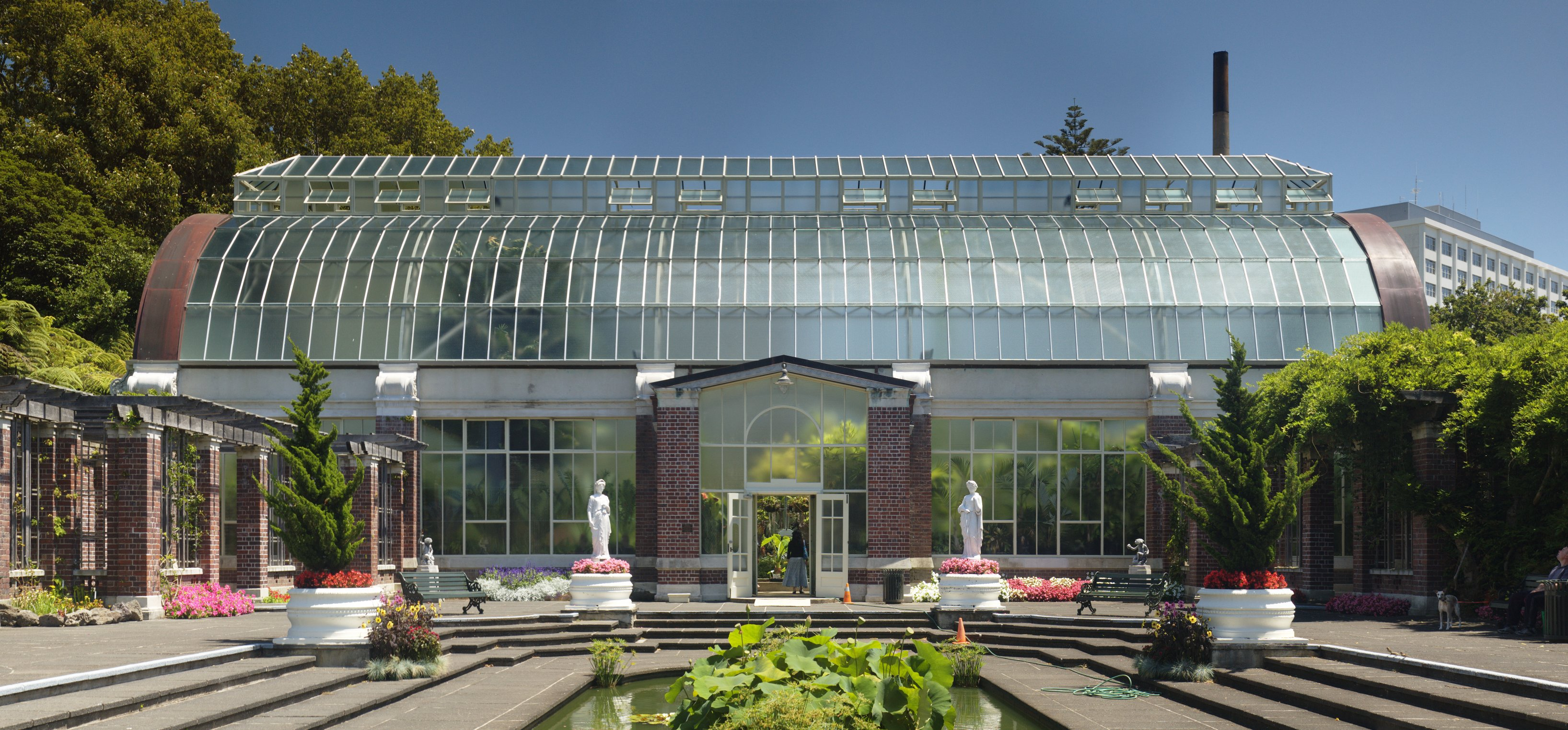
View of the Wintergardens Tropical House (1928) from the Temperate House (1921).

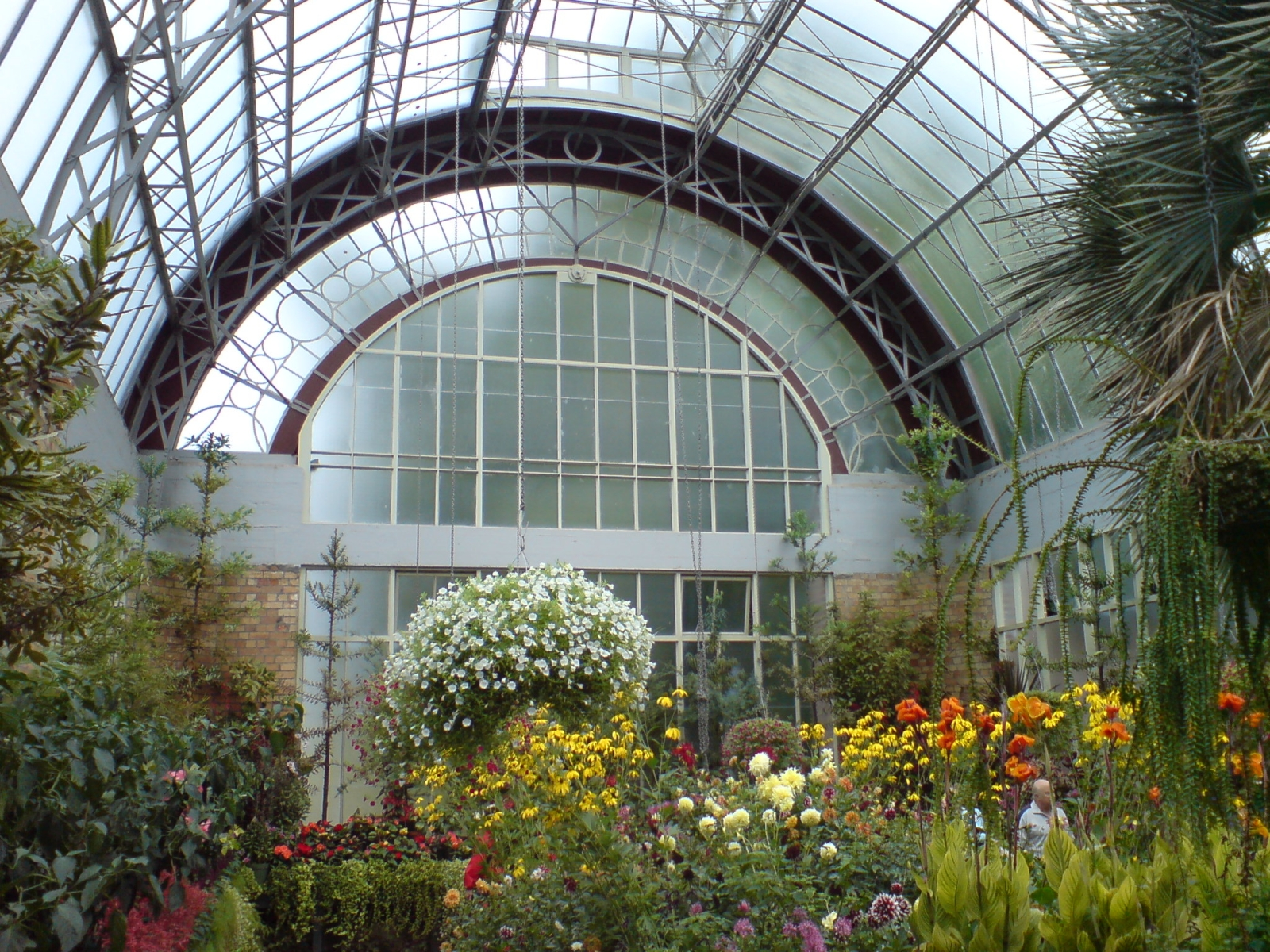
Inside the Wintergardens Tropical House.

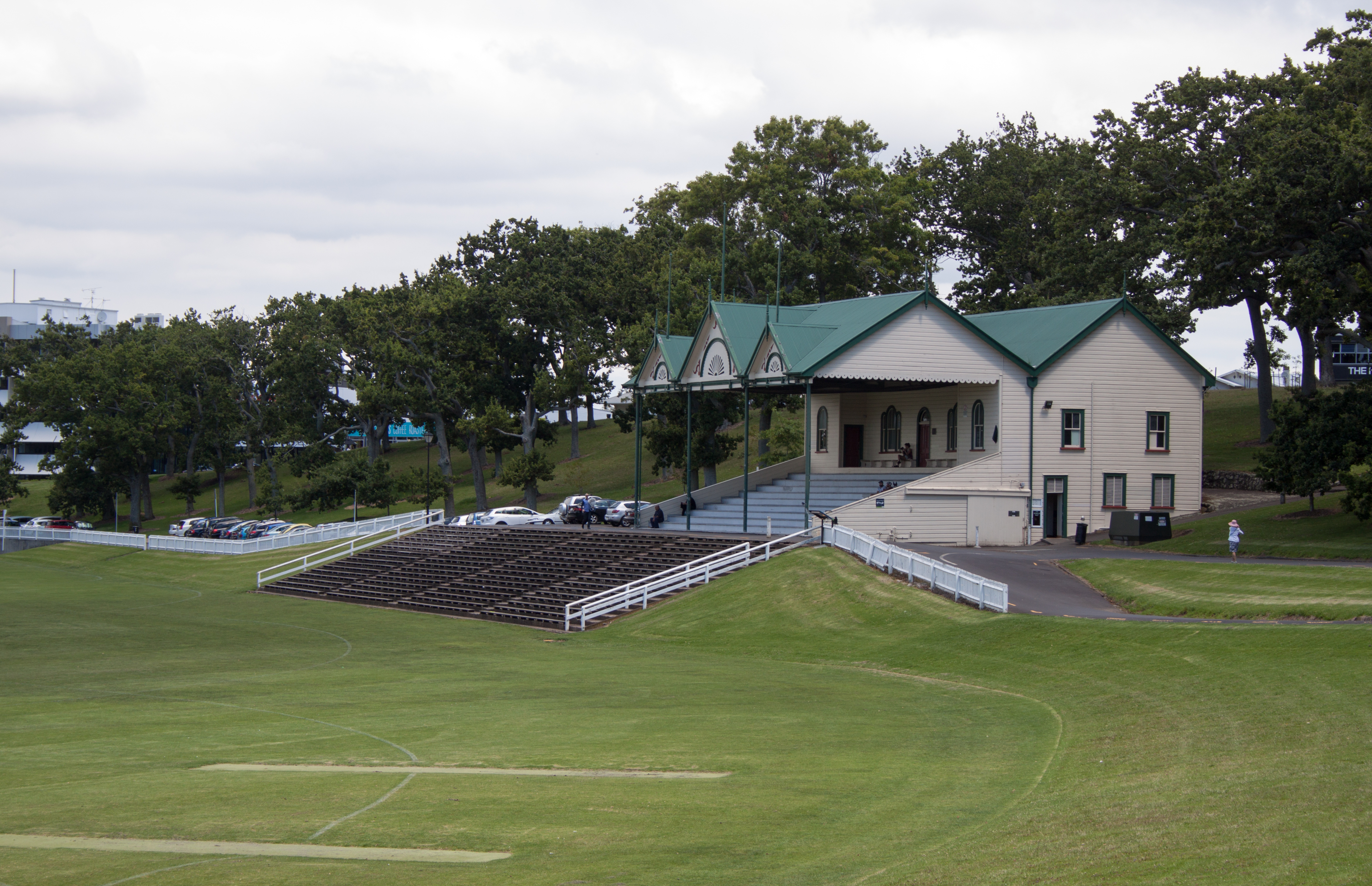
The Cricket Ground Pavilion (1898), grandstand and grounds at the Domain.

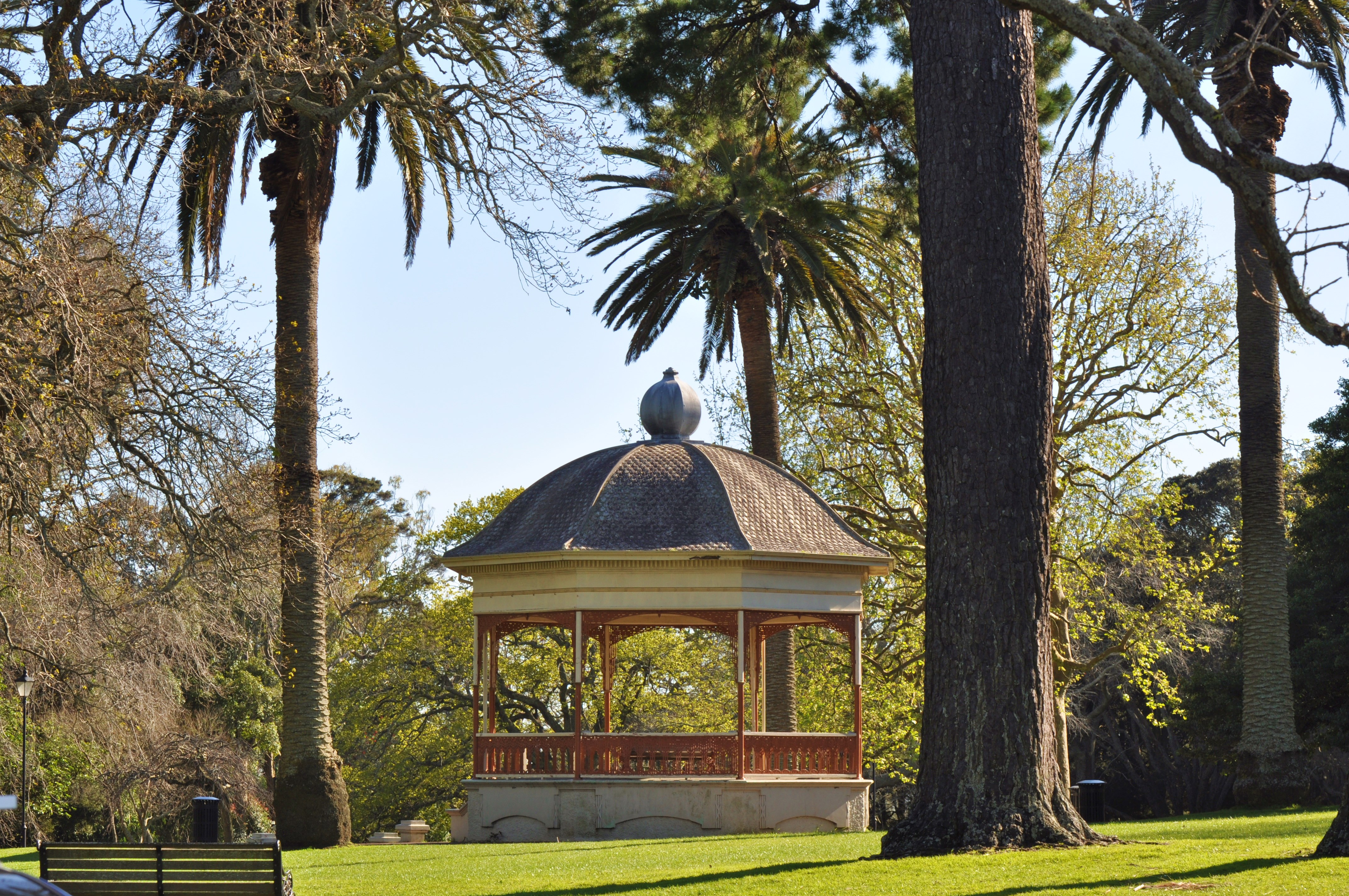
The Domain Bandstand (1912) also known as the Rotunda.

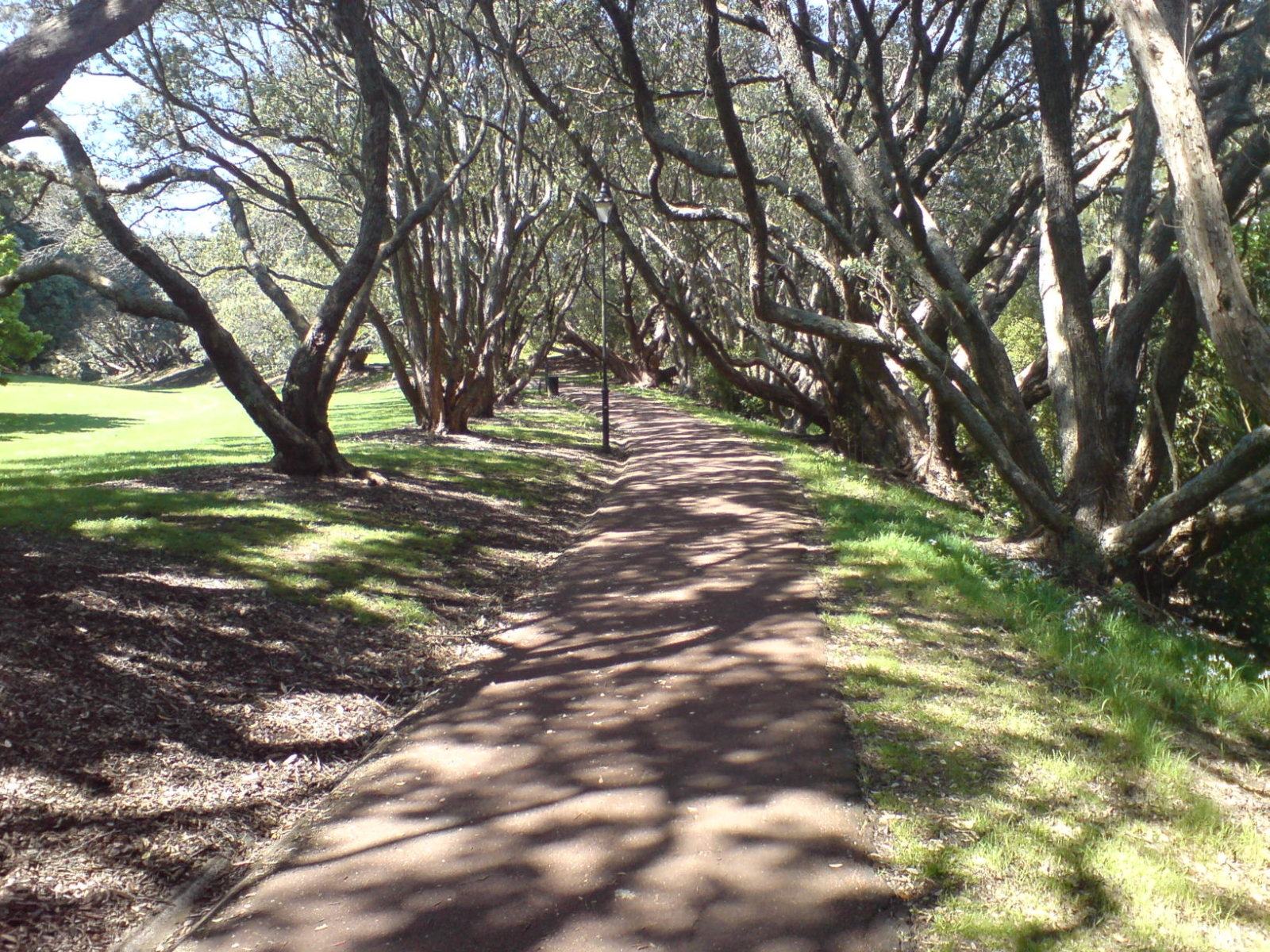
Pukekawa Centennial Glade path, created in 1940, to commemorate the founding of Auckland 100 years earlier.

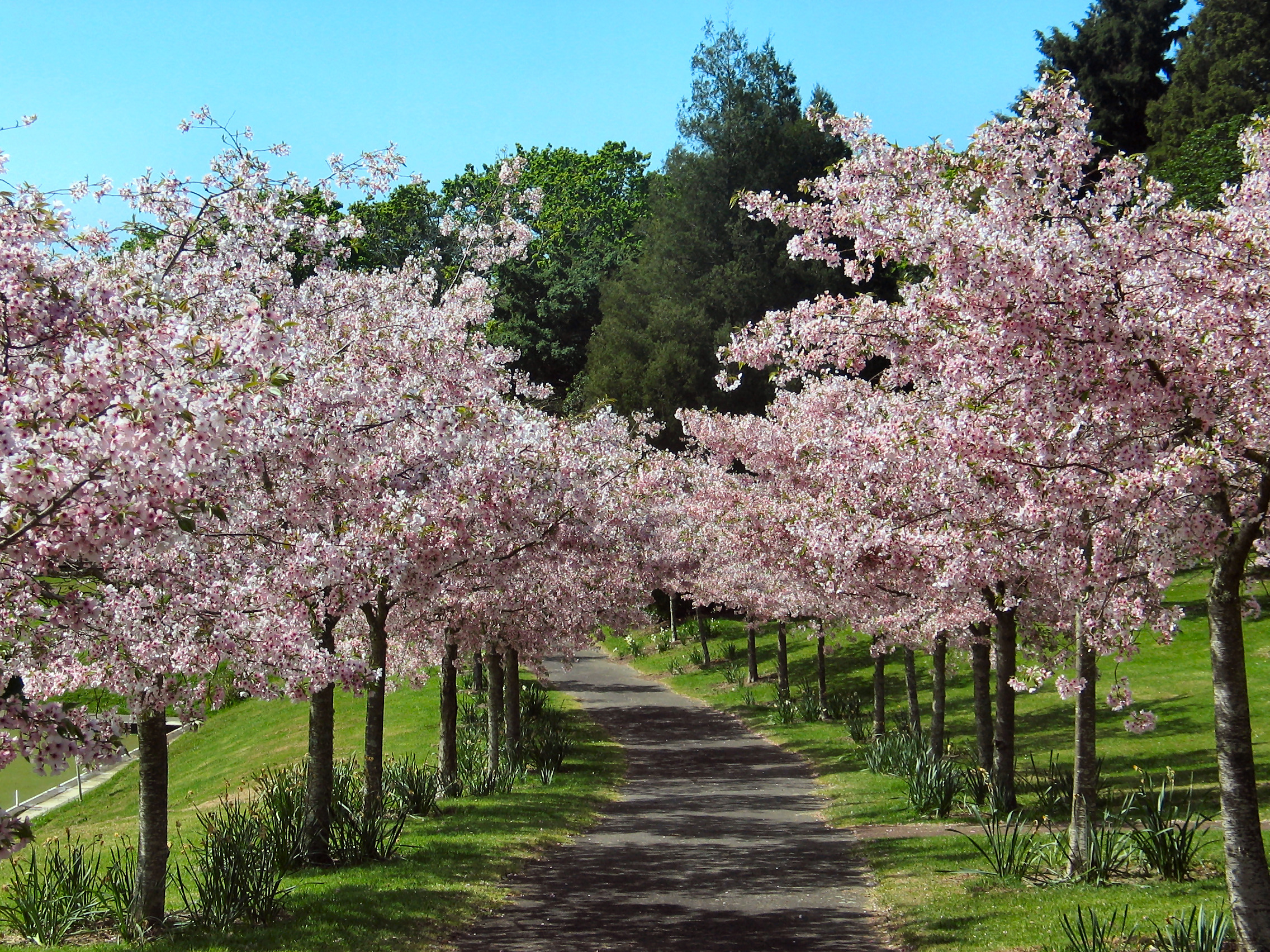
Cherry grove in flower at the Domain, near Grafton Road.
