= Gummer and Ford =

Architectural firm in New Zealand

Practice information
- Key architects: William Gummer, Charles Reginald Ford
- Founded: 1923
- Location: Auckland

Significant works and honors
- Buildings: New Zealand National Art Gallery and Dominion Museum, Dilworth Building, Auckland railway station, Remuera Public Library
- Projects: New Zealand National War Memorial, Christchurch Bridge of Remembrance, Dunedin Cenotaph
- Awards: NZIA Gold Medals

Gummer and Ford was an architectural firm founded in 1923 in Auckland, New Zealand, by William Gummer and Charles Reginald Ford. It was among the country's best-regarded architectural firm of the first half of the 20th century, designing numerous iconic buildings, including the former National Art Gallery and Dominion Museum in Wellington and the old Auckland railway station. Eighteen of the company's buildings have been registered as significant historic places by Heritage New Zealand. In 2006 an exhibition of their work was staged at The University of Auckland's Gus Fisher Gallery, and in 2007 the firm was described as 'the best architectural practice of all time in New Zealand'.

== History ==
When the partnership was established between Ford and Gummer, Gummer was already a highly successful architect. In his early 20s he had travelled to England and there worked for Leonard Stokes and Edwin Lutyens. The latter architect, later known mostly for his memorial designs, 'profoundly influenced' Gummer. He was placed third in a 1911 competition to design Parliament Buildings in London. After returning to New Zealand in 1914 he designed several well-regarded buildings including the New Zealand Insurance office in Auckland and the State Fire Insurance building in Wellington.

The partnership between the two men was highly productive. Gummer's biographer in the Dictionary of New Zealand Biography attributes this to their complementary skills and personalities. Ford concentrated primarily on managing the practice and dealing with clients, although he also did some design work. Amongst the firm's early successes were Auckland's Dilworth Building, and the Auckland Railway Station, awarded a New Zealand Institute of Architects (NZIA) gold medal in 1931. The firm had earlier won a gold medal for the Remuera Public Library in 1928.

Gummer and Ford designed numerous war memorials, including the New Zealand National War Memorial in Wellington, the Christchurch Bridge of Remembrance and the Dunedin Cenotaph. Gummer's school buildings include St Peter's College, Auckland (1939). They designed the Massey Memorial.

Gummer was responsible for virtually all of the firm's iconic buildings but Ford also contributed significantly to New Zealand architecture and building through his book Earthquakes and Building Construction. He was also influential in the establishment of earthquake safety standards in New Zealand after the 1931 Hawke's Bay earthquake, and the establishment of a Chair of Architecture at Auckland University.

Both Gummer and Ford were at various times president of the NZIA.

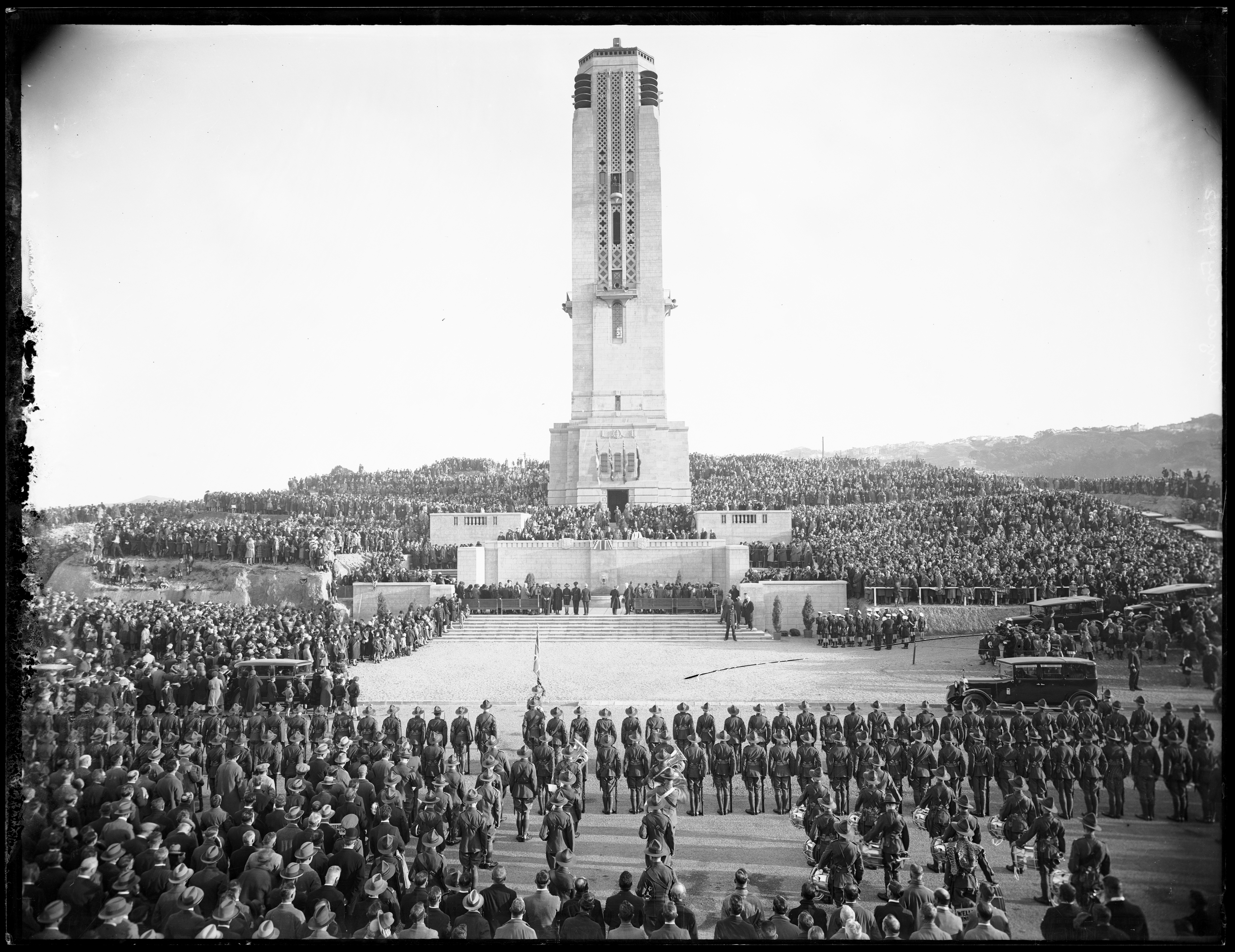
New Zealand National War Memorial

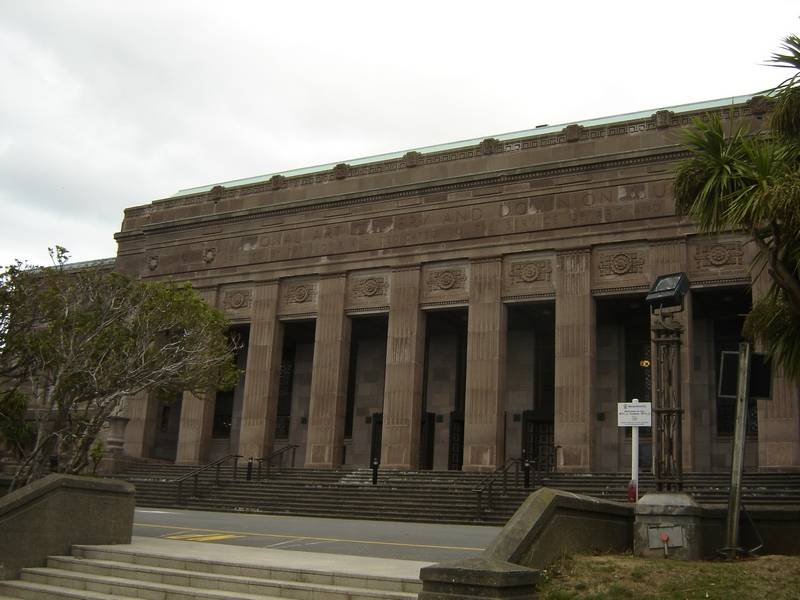
Dominion Museum building

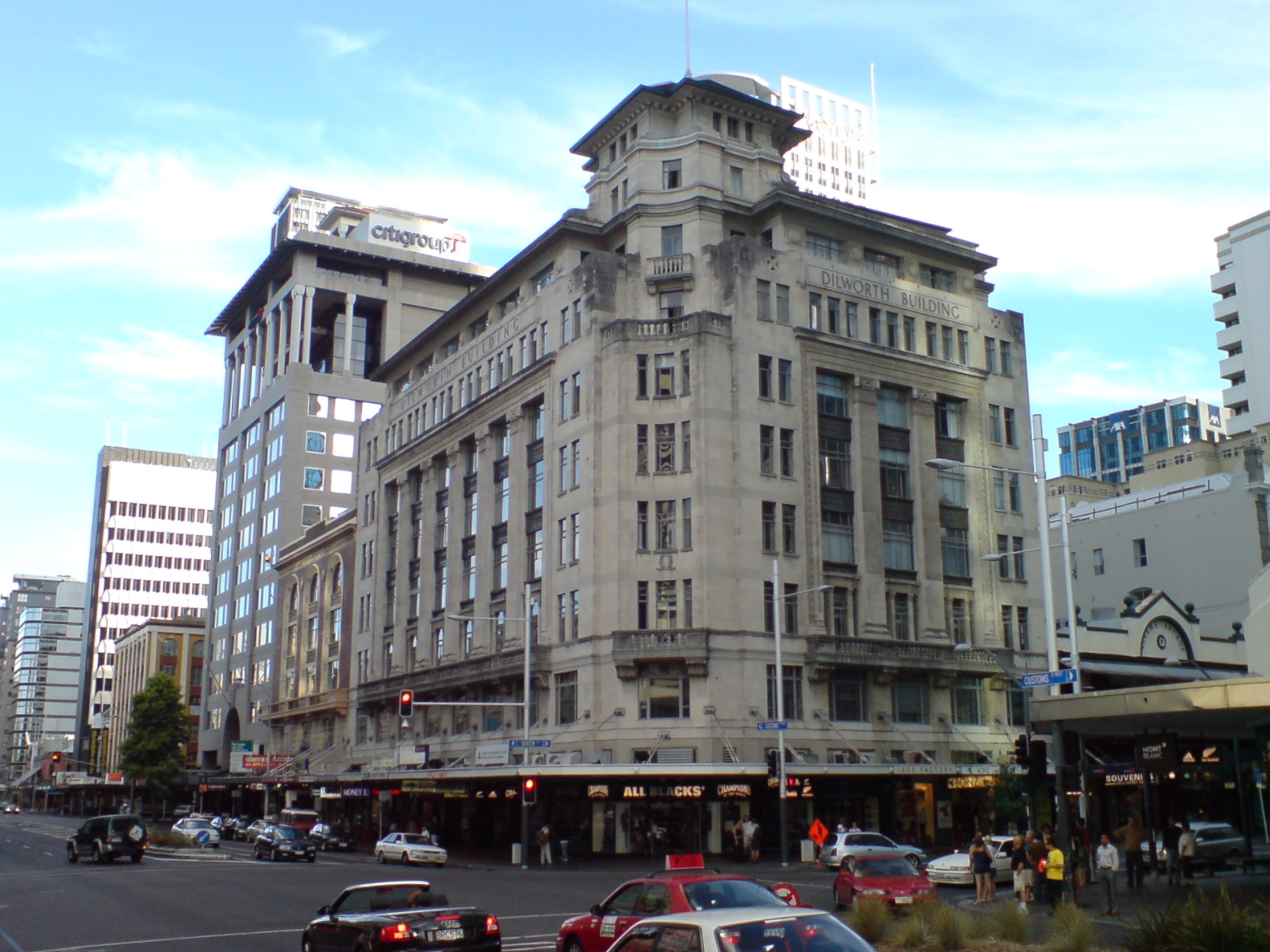
Dilworth Building

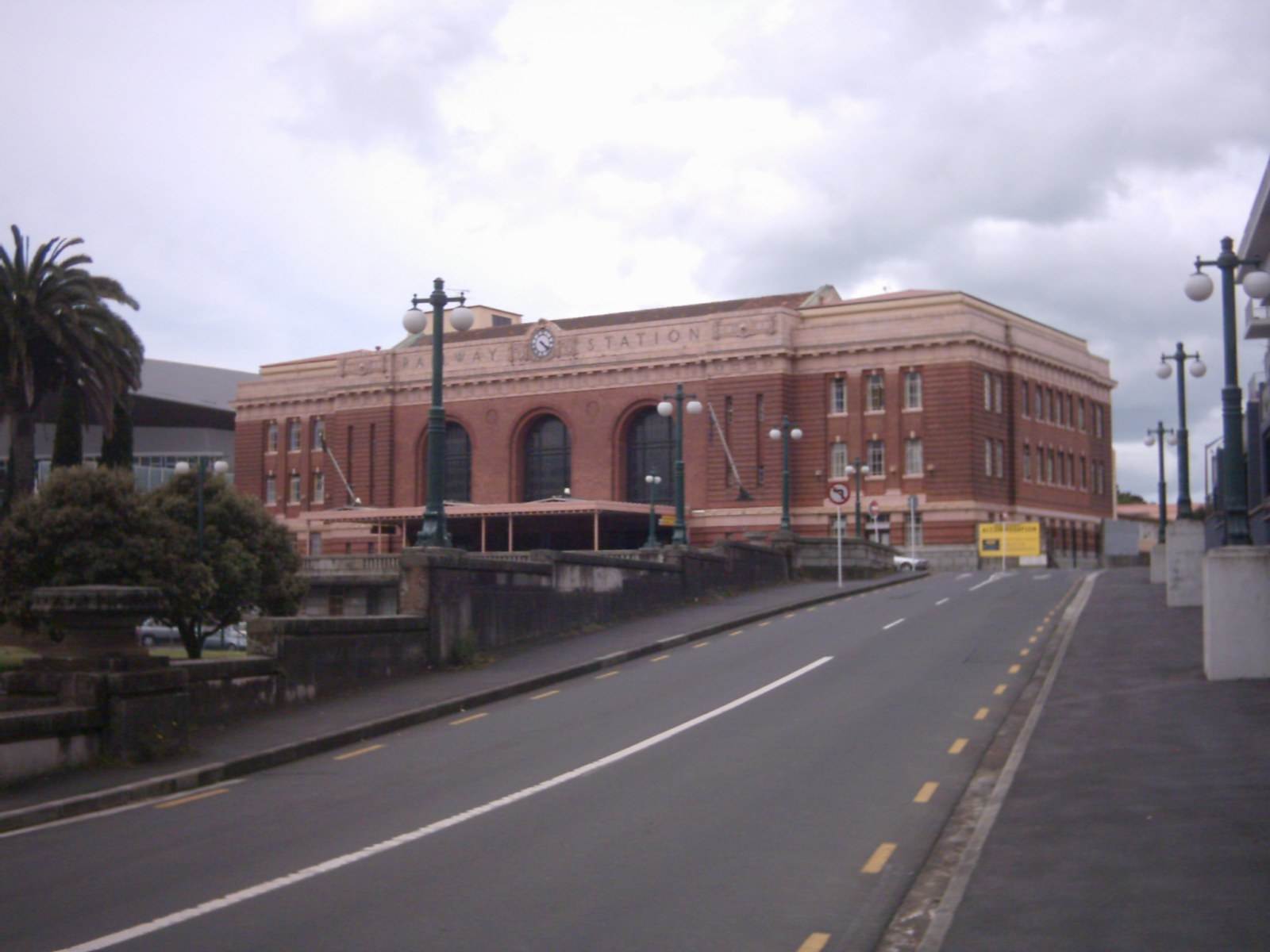
Auckland Railway Station

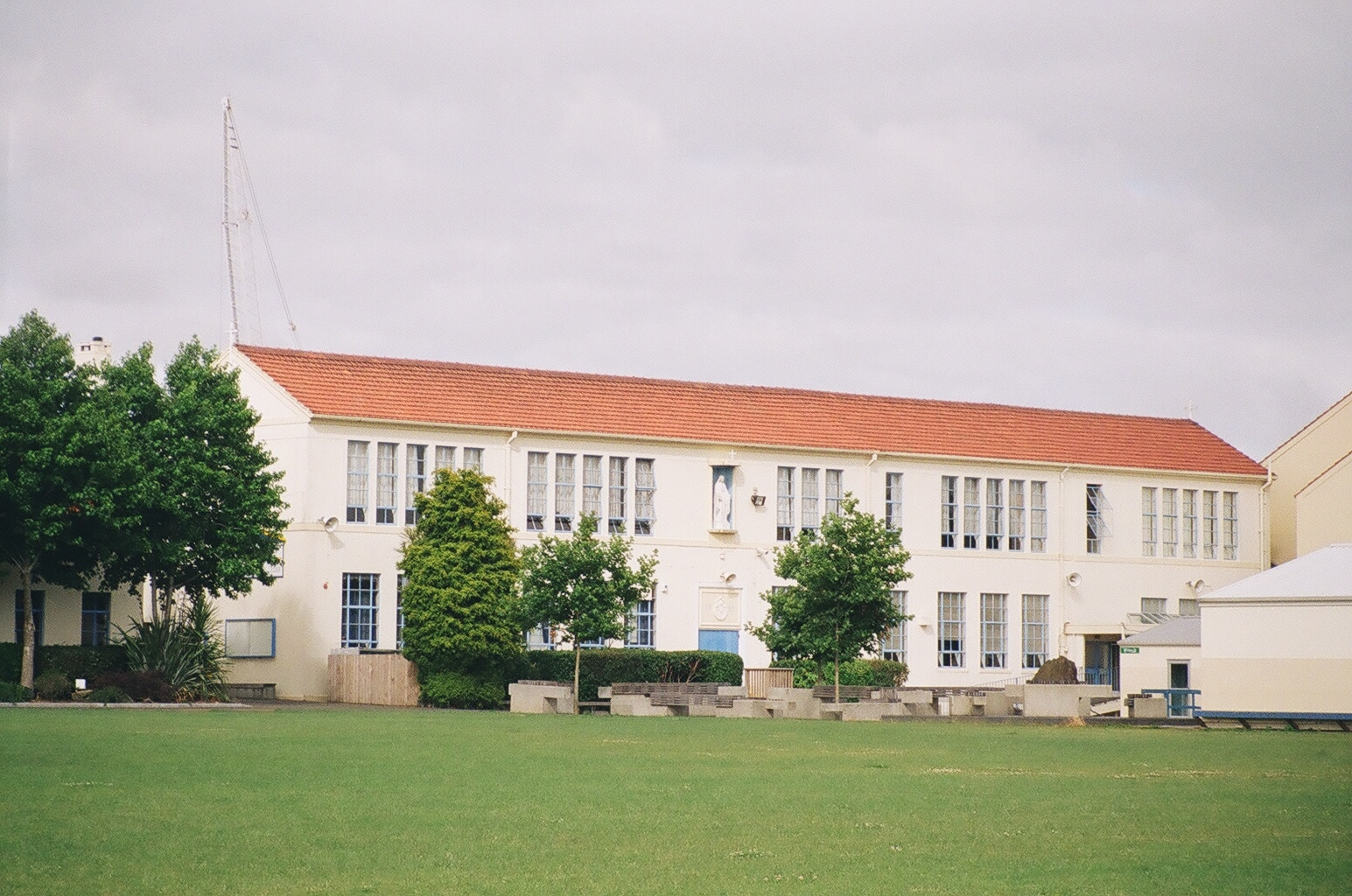
St Peter's College, Auckland

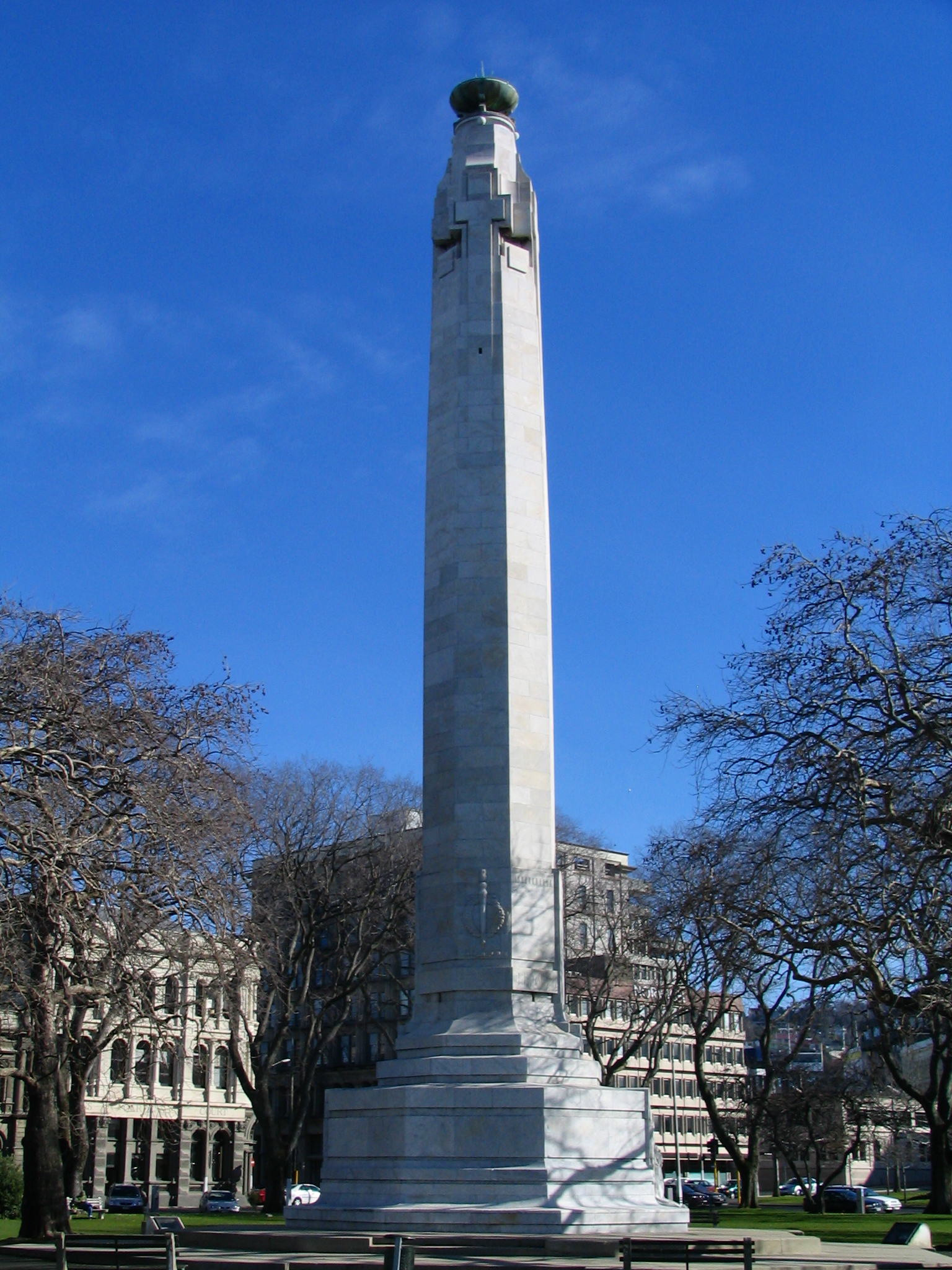
Dunedin Cenotaph

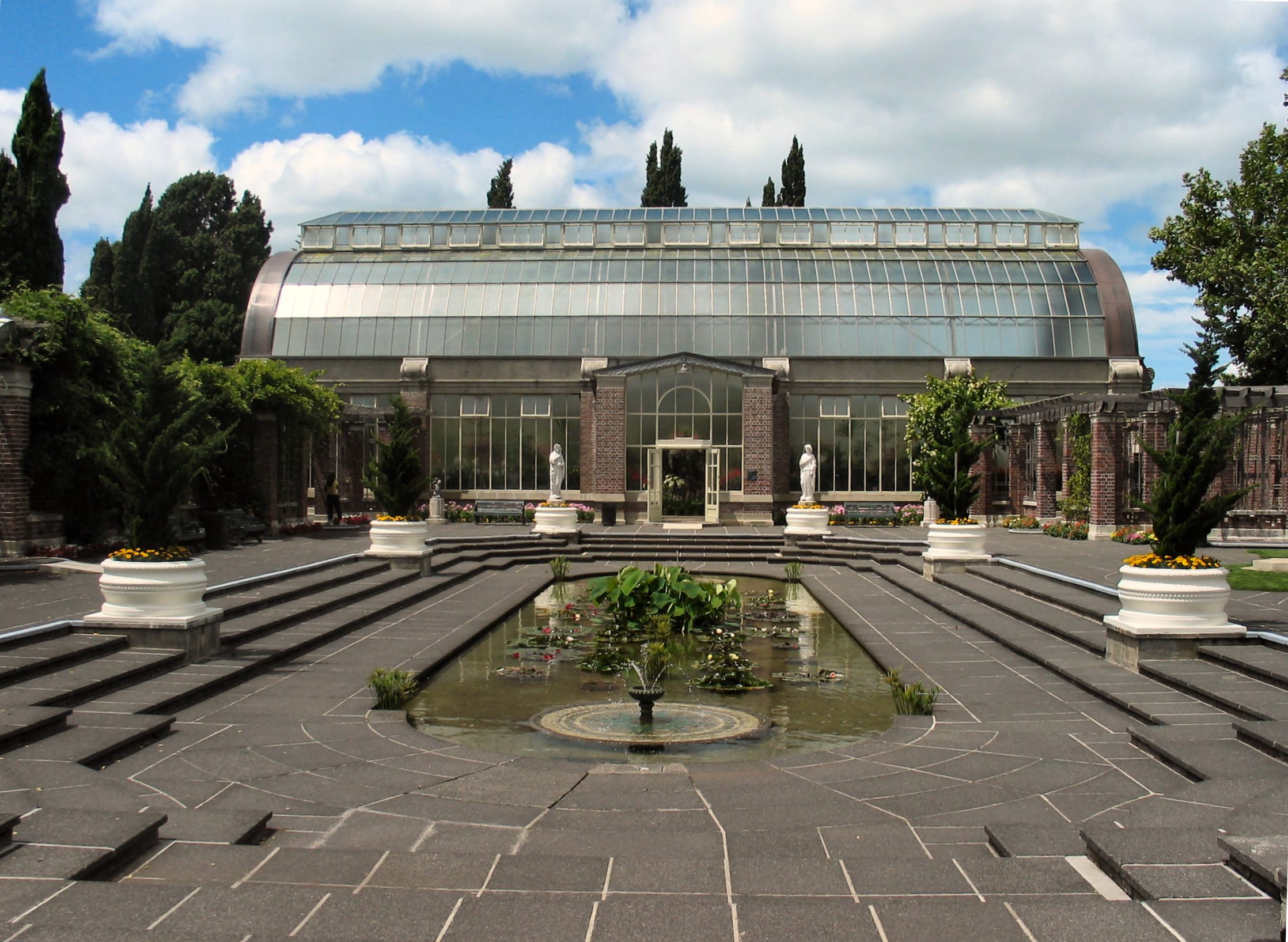
Auckland Domain Wintergardens

== List of notable works ==
Date	Work	Location
1916–1928	Domain Wintergardens	Domain Drive, Grafton
1923	Grey Lynn Library	Great North Road, Grey Lynn
1925	Remuera Library	429 Remuera Road, Remuera
1925	Dilworth Building	corner of Queen Street and Customs Street, Auckland CBD
1924–1958	Pearson House, Jubilee Institute for the Blind	10 Titoki Street, Newmarket
1926-1927	King Building, New Plymouth	42 Devon Street West, New Plymouth Central, New Plymouth
1927	Auckland railway station	132–148 Beach Road, Auckland CBD
1928	Mayfair Flats	75 Parnell Road, Parnell
1928–1930	Dingwall Orphanage	8 Dingwall Place, Papatoetoe
1931–1943	St Peter's College	23 Mountain Road, Grafton
1934–1935	Dingwall Trust Building	87–93 Queen Street, Auckland CBD
1935	Elliot Memorial Gates	Park Road, Grafton
1935	Good Shepherd Home for Girls	corner of Dominion Road and Hillsborough Road, Waikōwhai
1952	Auckland Grammar School Old Boys' War Memorial	87 Mountain Road, Epsom
1952–1953	Cornwall Park steps	Olive Grove, Greenlane
1953	Mangere Memorial Hall	23 Domain Road, Māngere
1955–1957	St Mary's Catholic Church	20 Kitenui Ave, Mount Albert
1961	Liston House	30–32 Hobson Street, Auckland CBD
1962	ANZ Bank	149 Upper Symonds Street, Auckland CBD (and various other locations)
1964	Maclaurin Chapel, University of Auckland	Princes Street, Auckland CBD

== Sources ==
- John Stacpoole, Opening address for 'Past Present: The Visionary Architecture of Gummer and Ford', at the Gus Fisher Gallery, 14 July 2006.
- Ian J. Lochhead, 'Gummer, William Henry' in the Dictionary of New Zealand Biography.
- PJD Waite, 'Safe as Houses', Heritage New Zealand, Summer 2005. Mostly about C. Reginald Ford.
- University of Auckland's Architecture Archive – BLOCK Building Tour of Gummer and Ford buildings in Auckland
