= Domain Wintergardens =

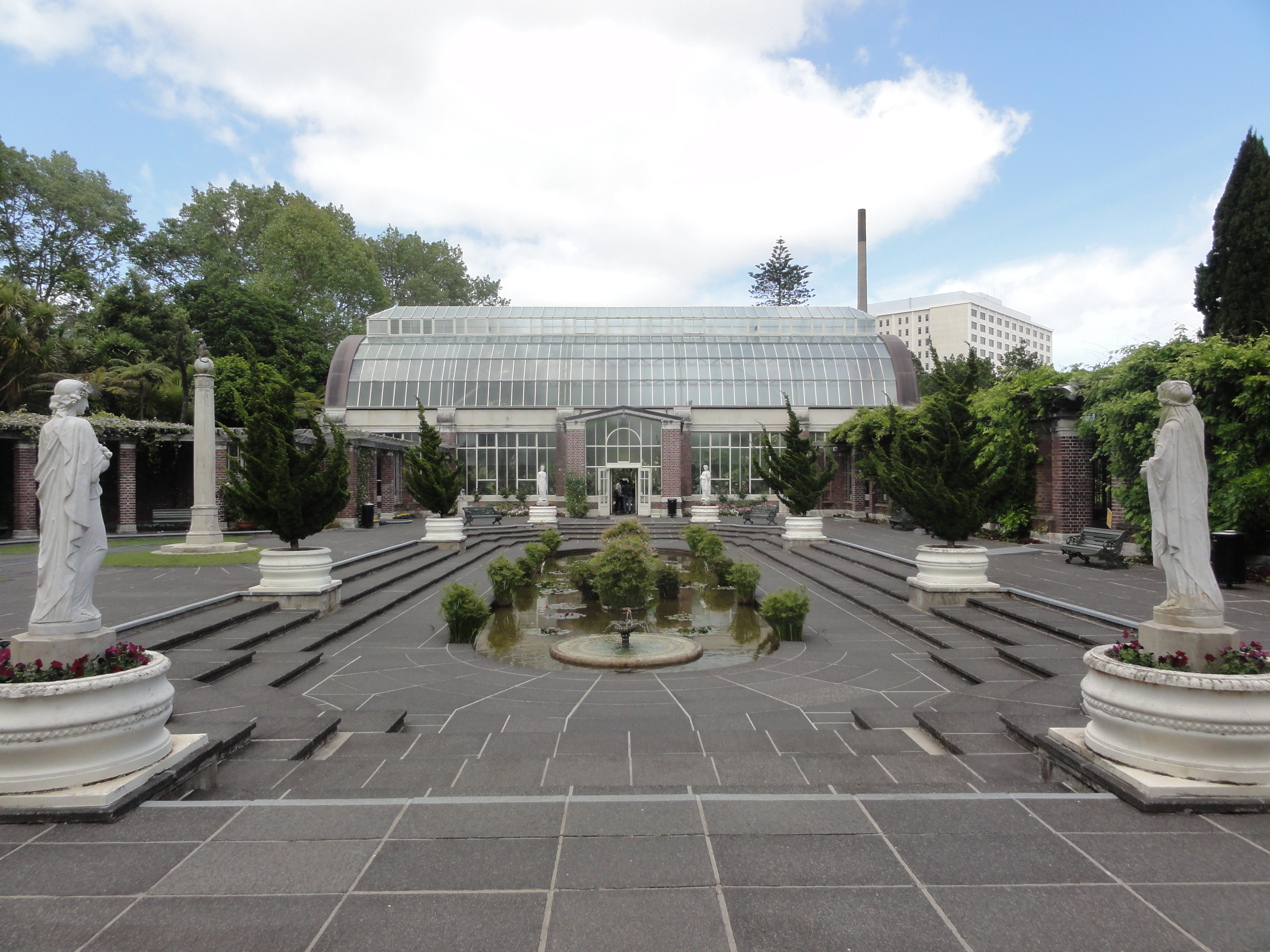
- Looking across the courtyard of the Wintergardens, towards the Tropic House with Auckland City Hospital visible in the background.

General information
- Type: Wintergarden
- Architectural style: Arts and Crafts
- Location: Auckland, New Zealand, Wintergarden Road, Grafton
- Coordinates: 36°51′37″S 174°46′27″E
- Construction started: 1916
- Completed: 1928
- Inaugurated: 2 May 1928
- Renovated: 1945, 1954, and 1993-1994
- Owner: Auckland Council

Design and construction
- Architects: William Henry Gummer and Charles Reginald Ford
- Architecture firm: Gummer and Ford

Heritage New Zealand – Category 1
- Designated: 21-Sep-1989
- Reference no.: 124

The Domain Wintergardens is a complex of gardens located within the Auckland Domain. It is registered with the Heritage New Zealand as a Category I Historic Place.

== Description ==
The Wintergardens consists of two large glasshouses: one non-heated Temperate House and one Tropical House (heated to an average of 28 °C). In between the two glasshouses there is an ornate courtyard with several neoclassical statues and a sunken pond in the centre. Off to one side is the Fernery which is situated in a former scoria quarry in the side of the small volcanic cone named Pukekaroro.

== History ==
The Domain Wintergardens were constructed following World War I with funds generated from the Industrial, Agricultural and Mining Exhibition of 1913-1914 (which was held at the same site). Additional funding for the Wintergardens came from a variety of other local benefactors. Perhaps most significantly was local businessman Sir George Elliot, who was the chairman of the exhibition, and also chairman of the Bank of New Zealand.

The Auckland Domain had been a public park since 1844 but was considered to be an area that was frequented by "undesirables". The Wintergardens were considered to be part of the gentrification of the park, providing an attraction for people in the area during the winter months.

=== Construction ===
The gardens were designed by Gummer and Ford, showing considerable influence from the English partnership of Edwin Lutyens and Gertrude Jekyll and the Arts and Crafts movement.

Initially only the Temperate House was built. This was opened and presented to the people of Auckland on 12 October 1921. The courtyard, the Tropical House, and the Fernery were added later in the 1920s. The initial stage cost £4000 to build. The second stage was constructed by Fletcher Building at a cost of £19500.

The Mayor of Auckland City, George Baildon, officially opened the completed Wintergardens on 2 May 1928.

=== Renovations ===
Many of the statues in the courtyard were added in 1945, and the sunken pond in the centre of the gardens was installed in 1954. A significant reconstruction project was undertaken during 1993 and 1994 to renovate the Wintergardens.

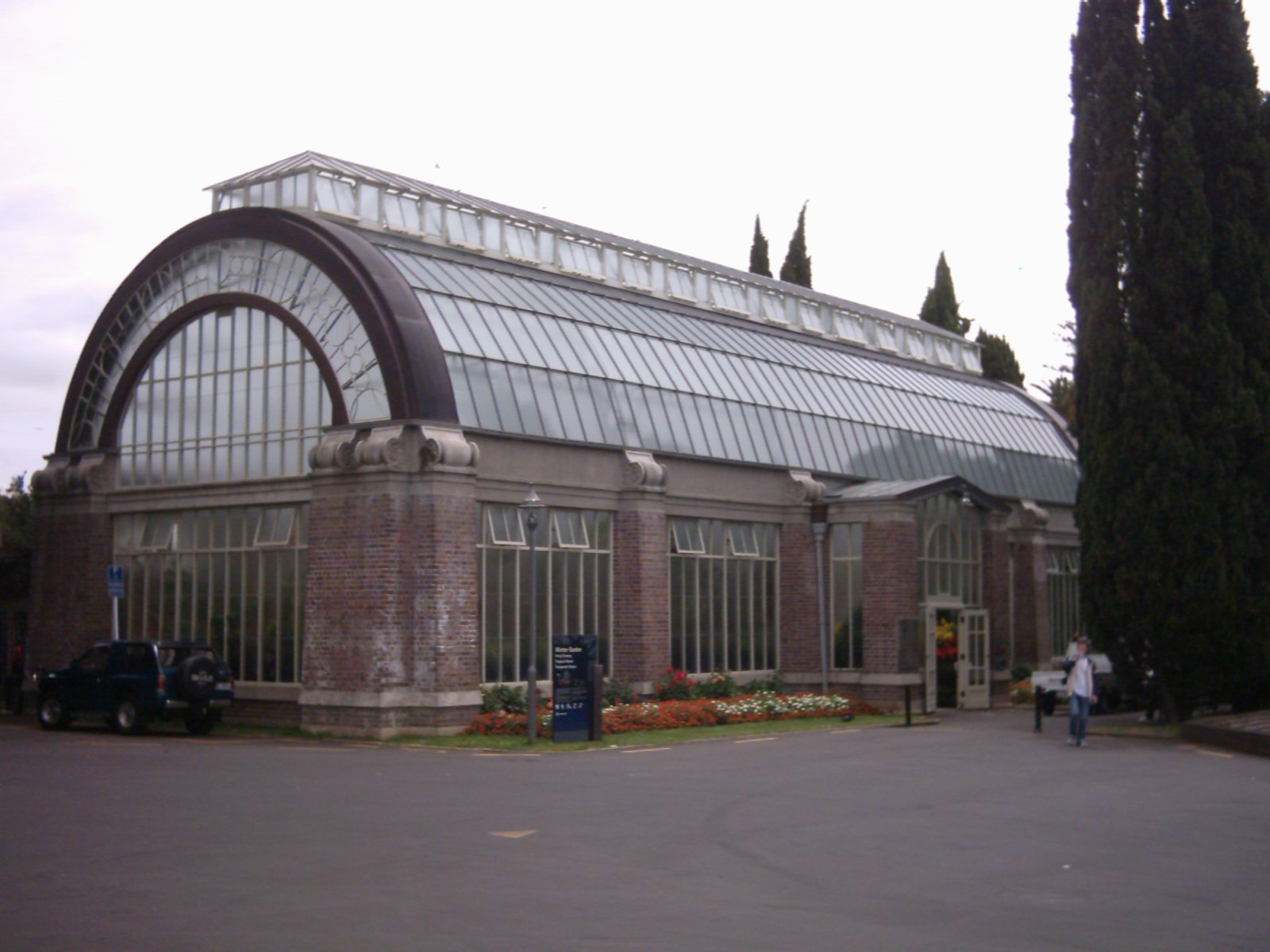
An exterior view of the wintergardens.

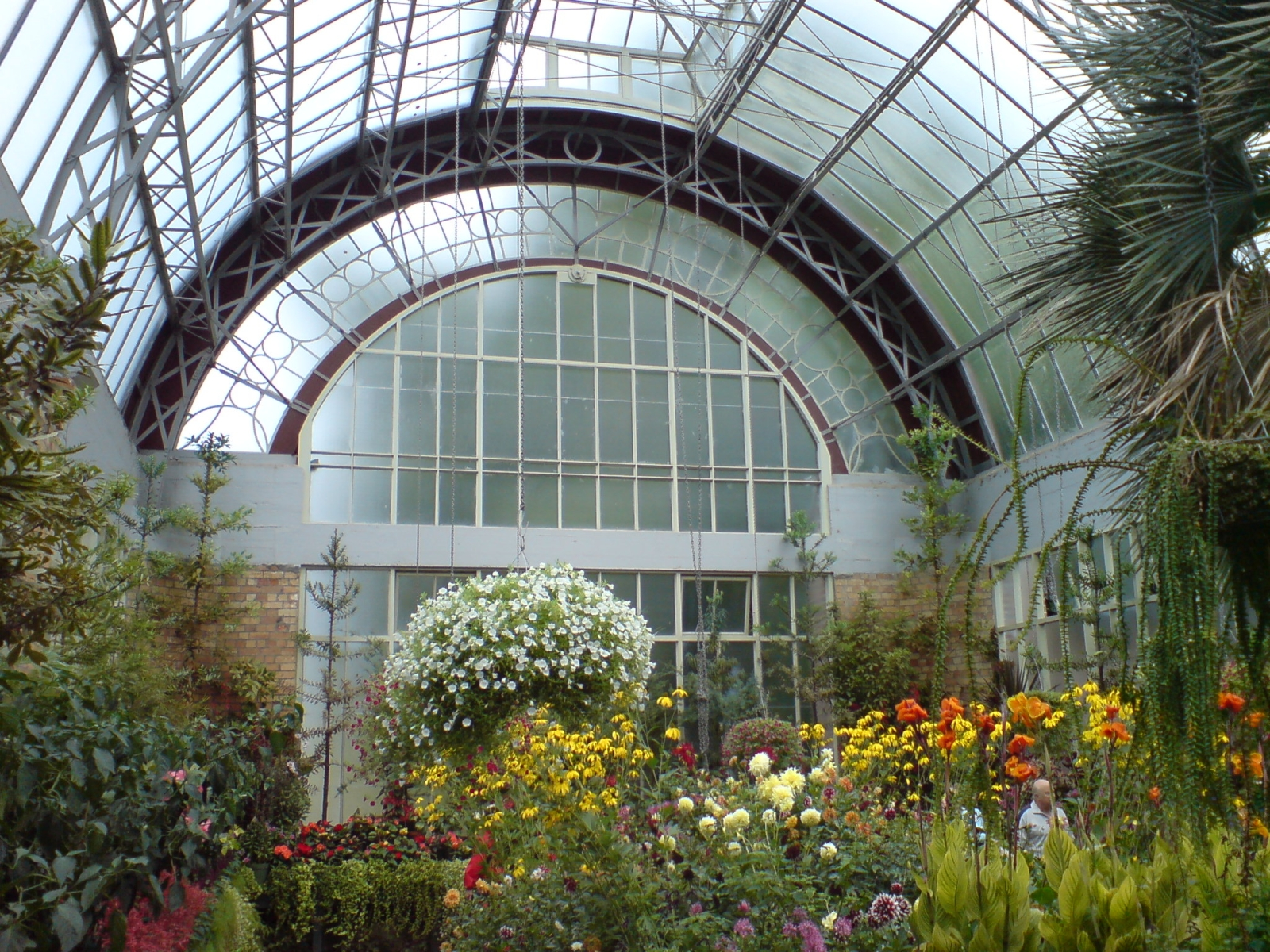
The interior of the temperate house.

On 1 December 2013, the Tropical House of the Wintergardens became the first place in New Zealand to have the giant Amorphophallus titanum in flower. This plant can take 10 years to flower, with the flower smelling of rotting flesh.

The glass houses were restored again between 2021 and 2023 at a cost of $5.62m.
