= Remuera Library =

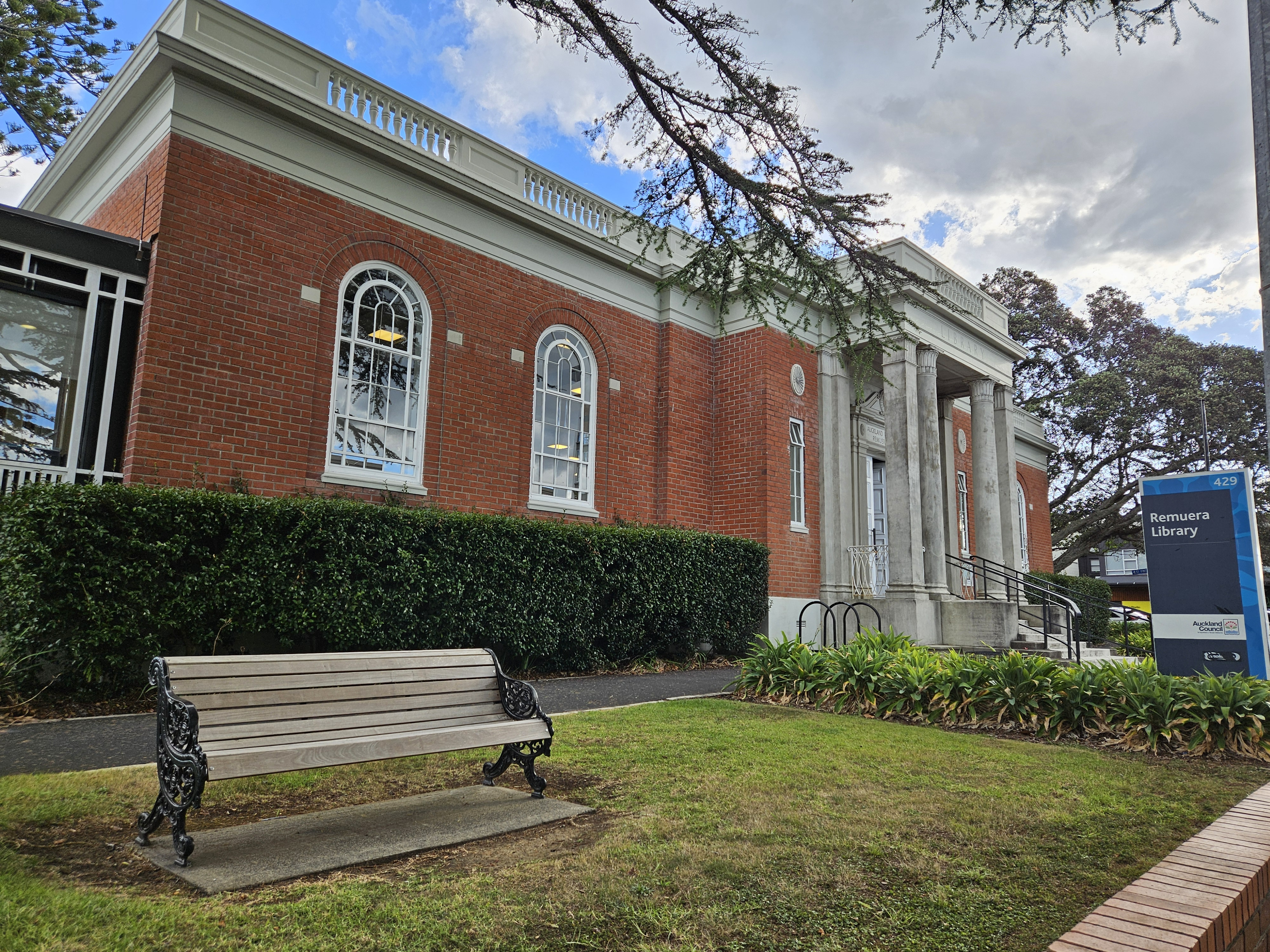
- Main entrance of the Remuera Library (2024)
- 36°52′52″S 174°48′00″E
- Location: 429 Remuera Road, Remuera, New Zealand
- Type: Public library
- Established: 2 October 1915; 111 years ago
- Service area: Remuera, Ellerslie, Greenlane, Meadowbank
- Branch of: Auckland Libraries

Collection
- Size: Floating

Other information
- Website: www.aucklandlibraries.govt.nz
- Building details
- Location within New Zealand

General information
- Type: Public Library
- Architectural style: Arts and Crafts
- Location: Remuera, Auckland
- Completed: 31 July 1926; 100 years ago
- Inaugurated: 1926; 100 years ago
- Owner: Auckland Council

Design and construction
- Architect: Gummer and Ford
- Awards: NZIA Gold Medal in 1928

Heritage New Zealand – Category 1
- Designated: 2 April 1985
- Reference no.: 115

Remuera Library is a local branch of Auckland Libraries, serving the suburb of Remuera. It is housed in a Category I Historic building, which is considered to be a landmark in the area.

== History ==
On 2 October 1915, the first Remuera library was established as the third branch library of the Auckland City Libraries. The two-storied building was designed by A. B. Herrold and constructed in 1912, originally housing the Remuera Road Board, and was located at 411–413 Remuera Road. The Remuera Road Board amalgamated with the Auckland City Council in 1915, leading to the library taking over the former road board offices. Additions were made to the library building in 1918.

In 1922, the Auckland City Council used funds from sale of electricity supply rights to Auckland Electric Power Board to buy land at the corner of Remuera Road and Saint Vincent Avenue, where a new library building was constructed for Remuera. In September 1926, the original library building was dismantled, with timber and some fittings of the building being sent to construct a new library at Point Chevalier.

On 31 July 1926, the Remuera Library was opened on its present site. The building was designed by the architectural firm Gummer and Ford, who were then one of the leading firms in Auckland. The building shows influences of Neo-Georgian and Arts and Crafts style architecture, stemming from Gummer's study in England under Edwin Lutyens. It has a largely open plan design, which was innovative at the time. The building won a NZIA gold medal for its design in 1928.

The building features a large lecture hall which had previously been used to deliver public lectures. At some point in the mid-twentieth century, Auckland Libraries ceased their public lecture series (largely due to declining interest) and the lecture hall was converted to accommodate the library's growing collection. There is an entrance to the library through the lecture hall which remained closed for much of its existence. There were various additions made to the library during the late 1950s and early 1960s, including the building of partitioning walls.

Major updates to the library building were undertaken between 1984 and 1985, and in mid-2002. The 2002 restoration undid many of the additions that had been made during the 1950s and 1960s. A disabilities ramp was installed leading to Saint Vincent Avenue and the lecture hall entrance to the library was finally re-opened. The staff workroom was also expanded, utilising the former stage as floorspace. These renovations led to the library winning another NZIA medal in 2004 in the Heritage and Conservation category. In 2006, there was some debate about the gnomon on the sundial installed outside the library being set in the wrong direction, and therefore not working.

The library underwent a renovation project from July 2024, involving general repairs and maintenance, seismic strengthening the building to meet legal requirements, fire safety enhancements, accessibility improvements and an interior refresh. The building was reopened in April 2025.
