= Auckland railway station =

Historic train station in Auckland, New Zealand

Auckland
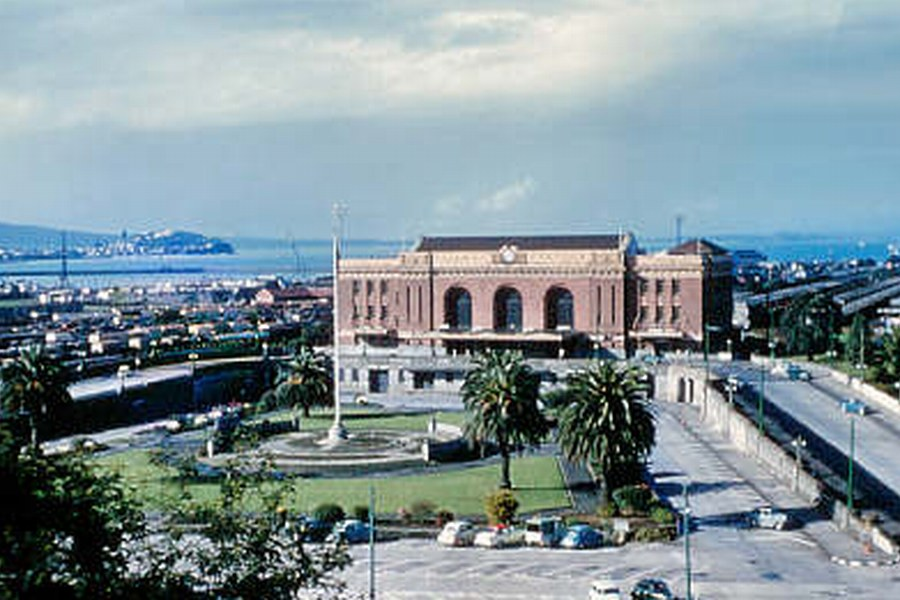
- Auckland railway station, Beach Road, around 1960. Platforms run off diagonally at right from the rear of the building

General information
- Location: 132–148 Beach Road, Auckland CBD, Auckland 1010
- Coordinates: 36.848090°S 174.776668°E
- Platforms: 7 (later 4)

History
- Opened: 16 November 1930
- Closed: 7 July 2003
- Rebuilt: Platform 6 & 7 partially rebuilt in August 2011, now known as The Strand Station

Heritage New Zealand – Category 1
- Designated: 29 November 1985
- Reference no.: 93
Location

Auckland railway station is the former main railway station of Auckland. Opened in 1930 on Beach Road, it replaced the previous Queen Street railway terminus which is approximately where the current main railway station – Waitematā (formerly Britomart) – is located. The 1930 station was the third station to serve as the rail terminus for Auckland, and remained the sole station serving the CBD until its closure in July 2003, when Britomart became the new terminus.

Two platforms of the former station are once again operational as part of the renamed Strand Station. The remaining platforms are now a stabling area for AM Class electric multiple unit trains. The railway station building has been redeveloped as an apartment (formerly student accommodation) building known as Grand Central Apartments. The building has been disconnected from the platform area since the 1990s. The Strand Station has been disconnected from the stabling facility since the 2010s. All three areas are inaccessible from each other from a general public perspective.

== History ==
=== Railway use & closure ===
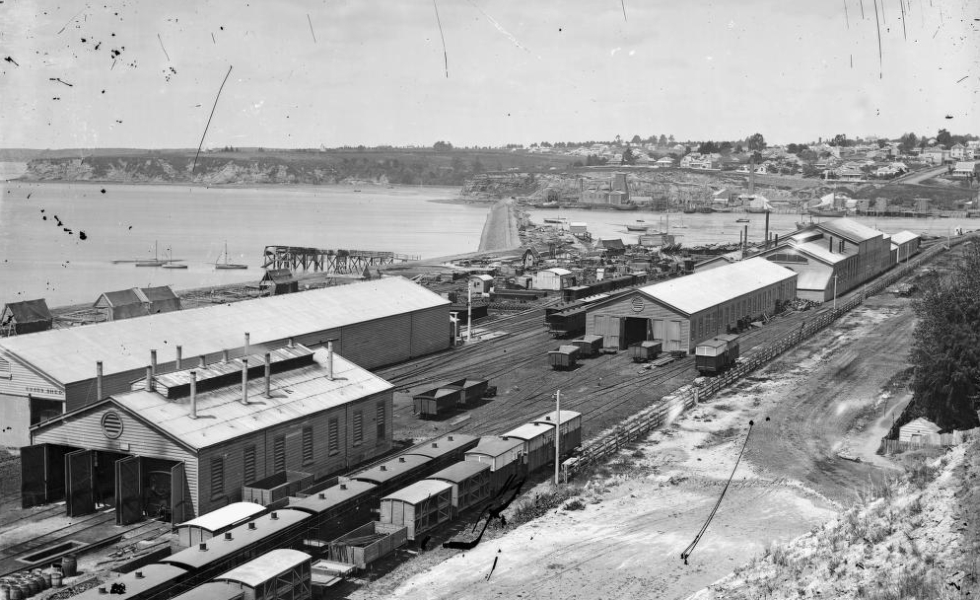
Railway yards at Mechanics Bay, 1880s; the bay would be reclaimed for Auckland railway station and yards over the next 40 years

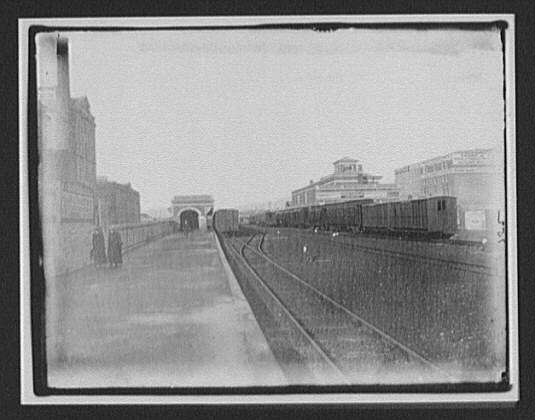
Auckland railway station, 1895, on the Queen Street frontage where the Britomart building now stands

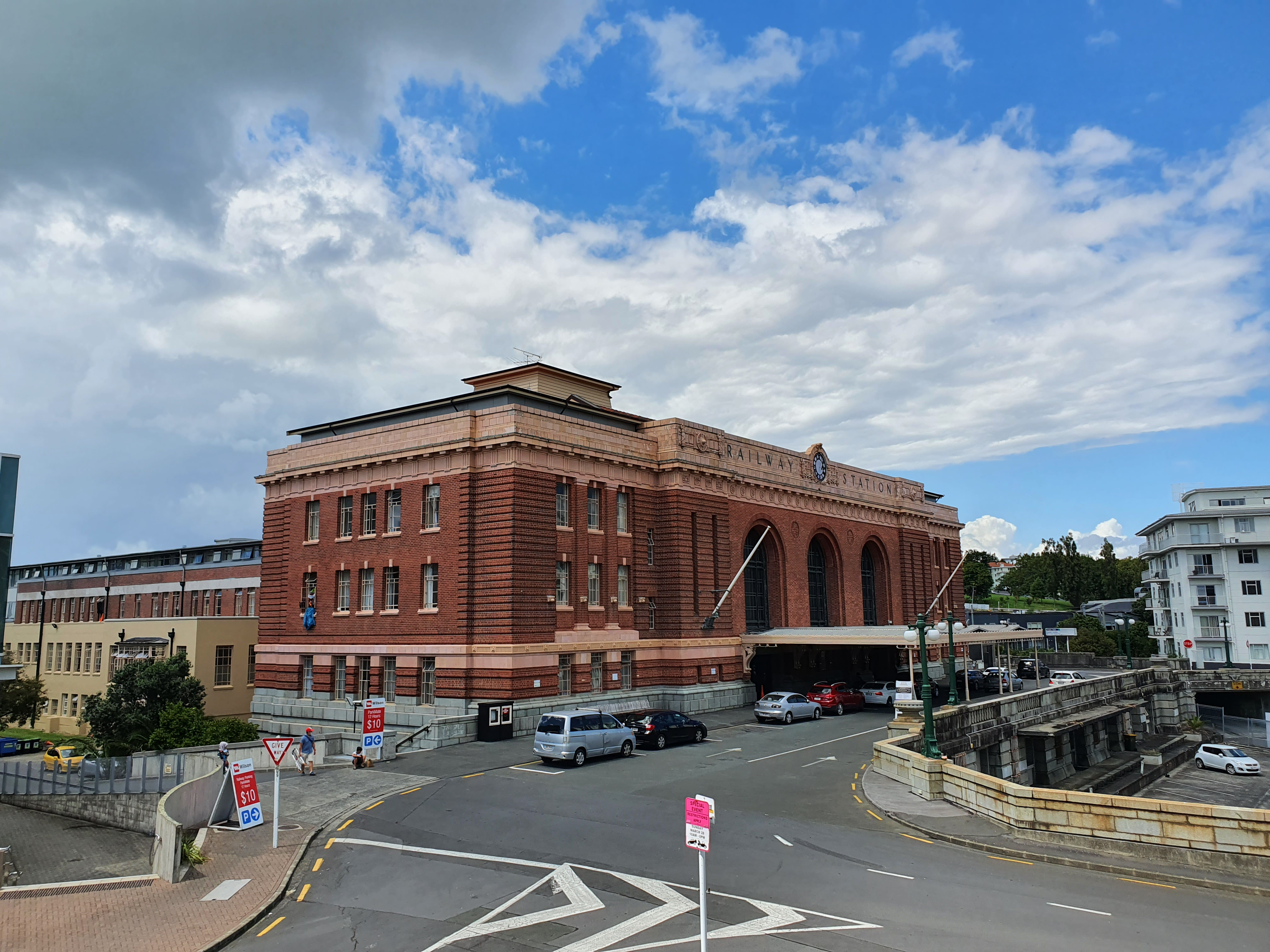
Former Auckland railway station on Beach Road. It has since been converted to apartments. As of 2017, the site is called the Grand Central Apartments Auckland

The Auckland railway station was built by the New Zealand Public Works Department between 1928 and 1930 and sits on reclaimed land on Beach Road close to the wharves. It replaced a smaller terminal on the site of Britomart. The grand and ornate building was intended to serve as a gateway to the city, and its construction cost of £320,000 was the largest independent contract awarded in New Zealand. It has great historical importance for its associations with the public building programme of the 1920s, and with the central role played by the railways in national transport.

The Auckland railway station building has been a city landmark from the time it was opened in 1930, and is a grand architectural statement in beaux-arts brick and mortar, having been called "one of the most self-consciously monumental public buildings erected in early twentieth-century New Zealand". The building was designed by William Henry Gummer (1884–1966), a student of Sir Edwin Lutyens and architect of various notable New Zealand buildings such as the Dilworth Building in Queen Street.

The symmetrical facade of the three storey-high building was constructed of reinforced concrete, faced with brick and Coromandel granite. It is approached by a sweeping ramp on either side of the building, enclosing a landscaped garden immediately to the front. The building's design echoed American models, such as Union Station in Washington, D.C. and Pennsylvania Station in New York City, considered the most striking and luxurious examples of the time. It has also been favourably compared with Grand Central Terminal, in New York City as well, and the National Theatre in Melbourne.

The station was given ornate public spaces and a wide variety of amenities, from waiting and dining rooms to shops and a first aid station. The metal ceiling in the main lobby was manufactured in Germany and the parts shipped out and reassembled. The looming threat of German aggression meant that its origins were quickly downplayed and obscured. The rest of the lobby has imported marble and bronze detailing with a terazzo floor. The detailing extended to the restrooms with imported panelling, light fittings, period-style furniture and porcelain sanitaryware.

Underpasses and ramps linked the station building with an extended platform network to the rear, built with elegant concrete canopies and other elements as integral parts of the original design and function. With modifications, the building was used as the main point of arrival for rail passengers in Auckland for most of the century.

Over 80,000 tiles were used to decorate the building, together with coats of arms of some cities.

The station building was sold during the privatisation of part of the New Zealand Railways Corporation during the 1990s, partly because of the impending construction of Britomart Transport Centre, which would become the new railway station for the city centre.

The station platforms remained open until July 2003 when Britomart was opened. A single platform remained in use to serve a limited number of peak-hour suburban services which continued to operate for several months after the opening of Britomart, known as The Strand Station. In the decade that followed, the platform was occasionally used by excursion trains although, along with the rest of the platforms, it became largely dilapidated.

=== Subsequent usage of the station building ===
In 1999, the station building was partly converted for use as student accommodation for Auckland University and named The Railway Campus. It was the largest of the university's residences, and had 426 bedrooms, in a total of 230 apartments. The residence was awarded four stars by Qualmark in the Student Accommodation category, which evaluated the facilities as well as the level of pastoral care and support for students, and was accredited by the New Zealand Association of Tertiary Education Accommodation Professionals.

In 2007, major weather-tightness problems appeared. Tenants were required to leave while a multi-million dollar restoration programme was undertaken. The effect of the water leaks on the prices of the apartments in the complex was marked – while the high price in the early 1990s was $160,000, apartments sold for a nominal sale price as low as $12,800 (with most going around $20,000) as owners extricated themselves from the problem investment. In November 2008, the university announced that it would no longer be using the building for student accommodation, due to weather-tightness issues and associated works. Values had by early 2010 recovered to an average sale price of $55,000.

Since the university vacated, the accommodation has been turned into the Grand Central Apartments.

Platform 8 restaurant occupies the foyer of the 1930 station.

=== Subsequent usage of platform area ===
In 2011, the Strand Station was officially reopened as its own separate station, encompassing the former Platform 7 (later Platform 4) and Platform 6 (later Platform 3) as the new platforms 1 & 2 respectively of the Auckland railway station. The station's reopening was purposed so it could serve as a potential backup for Britomart during the 2011 Rugby World Cup. Although never utilised for this purpose, it has since served as an emergency backup alongside Newmarket railway station. The Strand Station became the terminus for the long-distance Northern Explorer service in June 2011.

Since 2013, the remaining platforms have been converted into a stabling facility for the suburban AM class fleet.

== Gallery ==
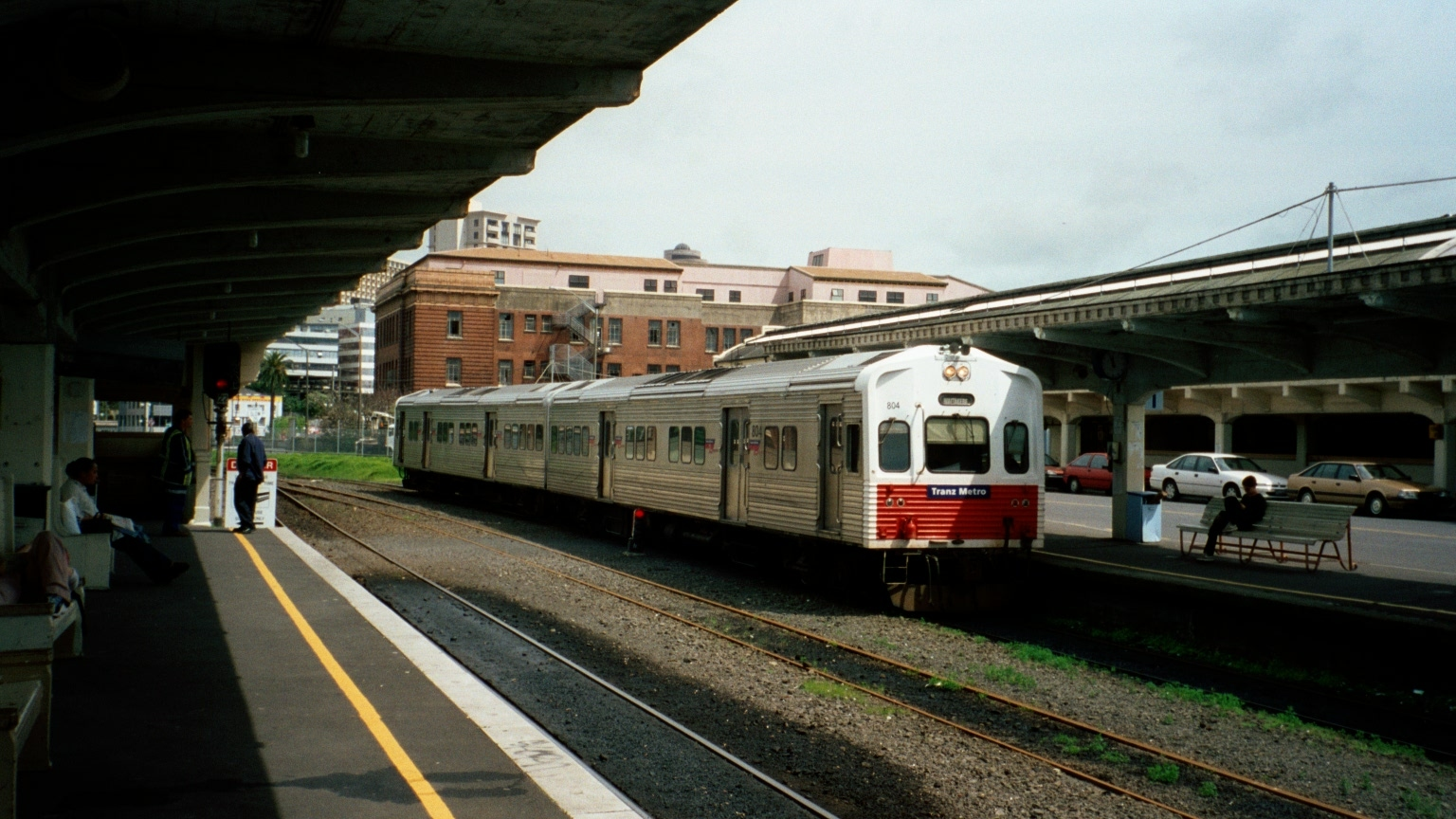
An ADL/ADC Class unit departing the former Platform 1 (originally Platform 4).

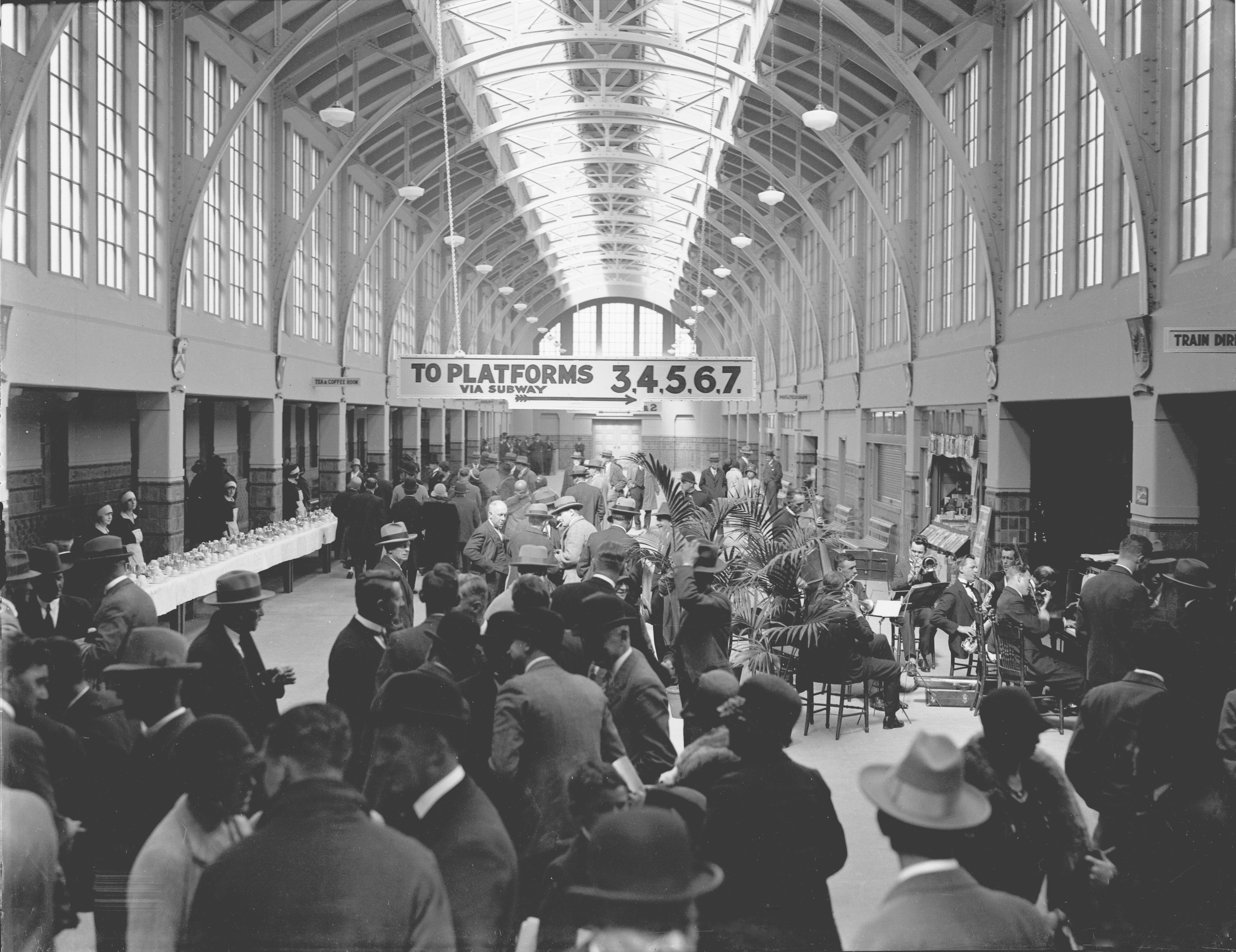
The interior of the station when it was in use.

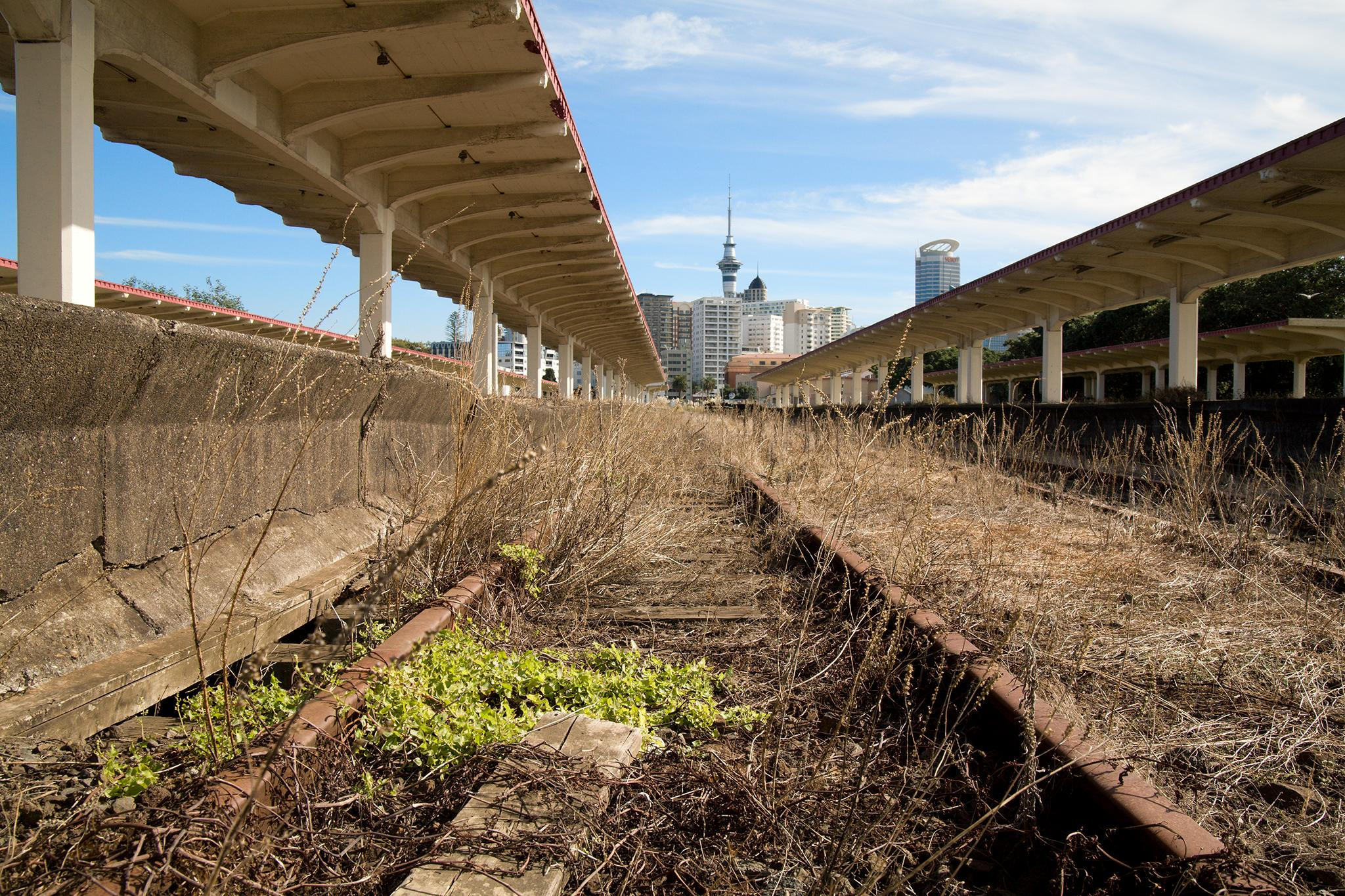
The abandoned platforms in 2008

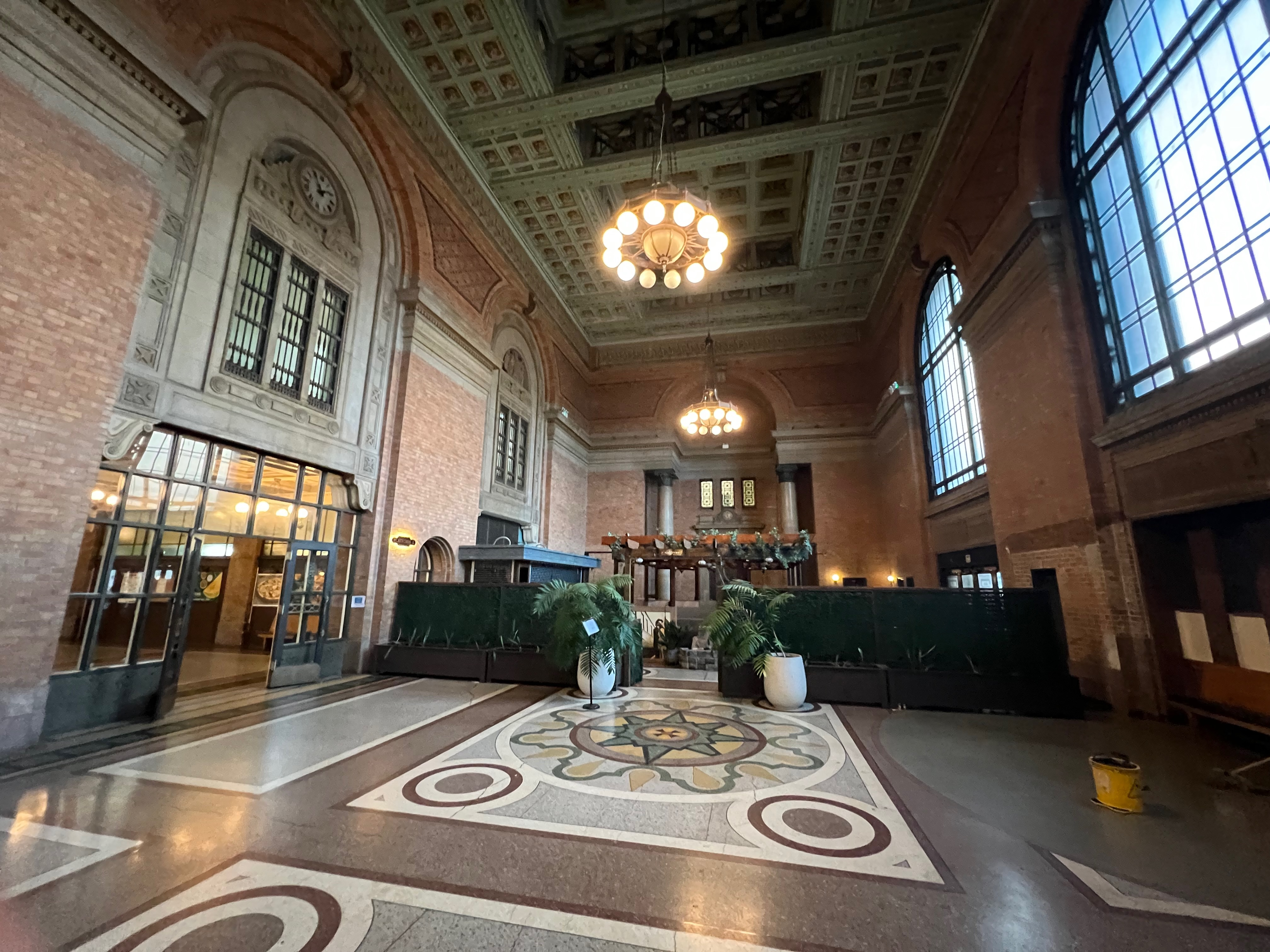
Entrance lobby in 2025

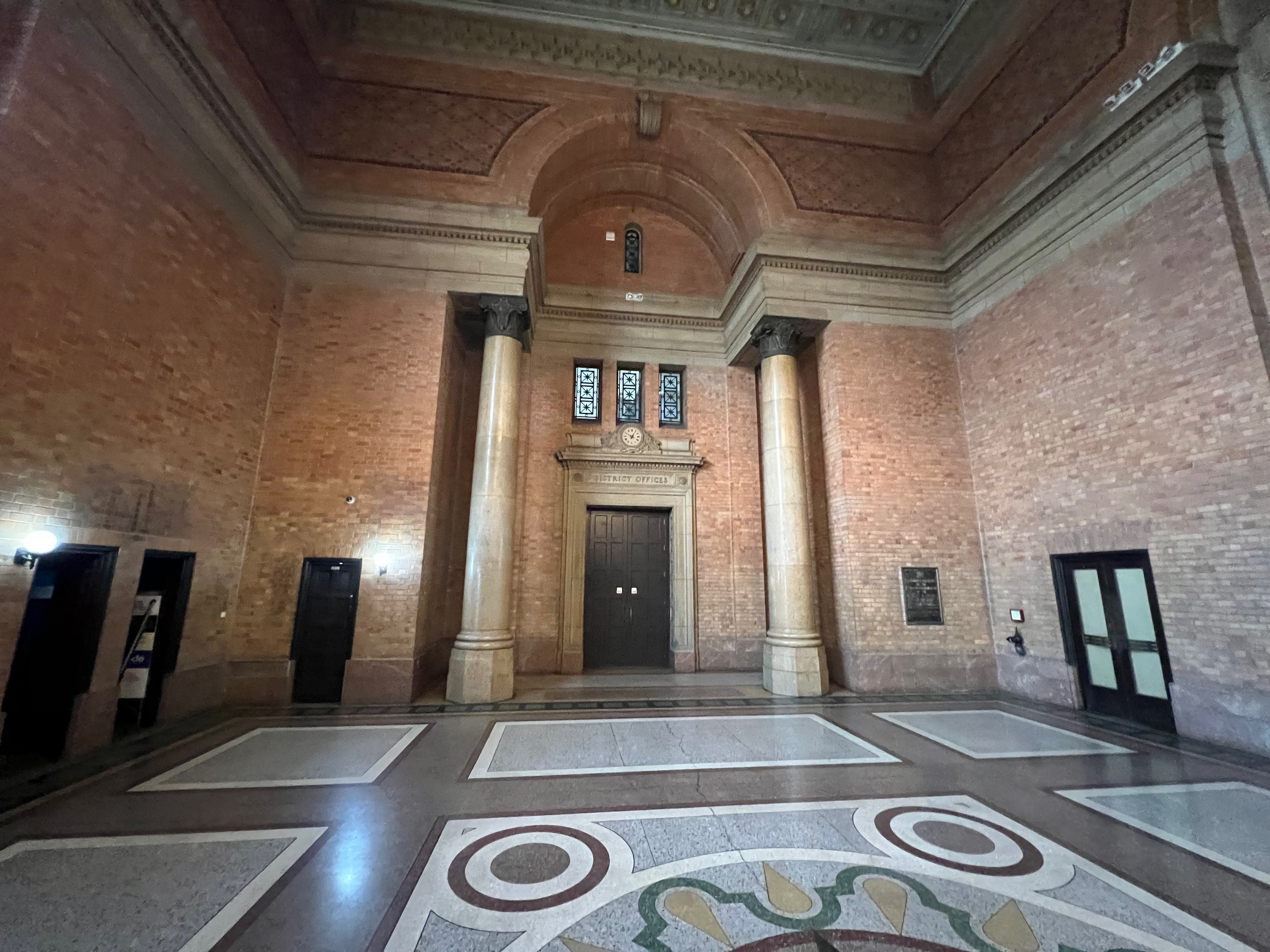
North side of entrance lobby

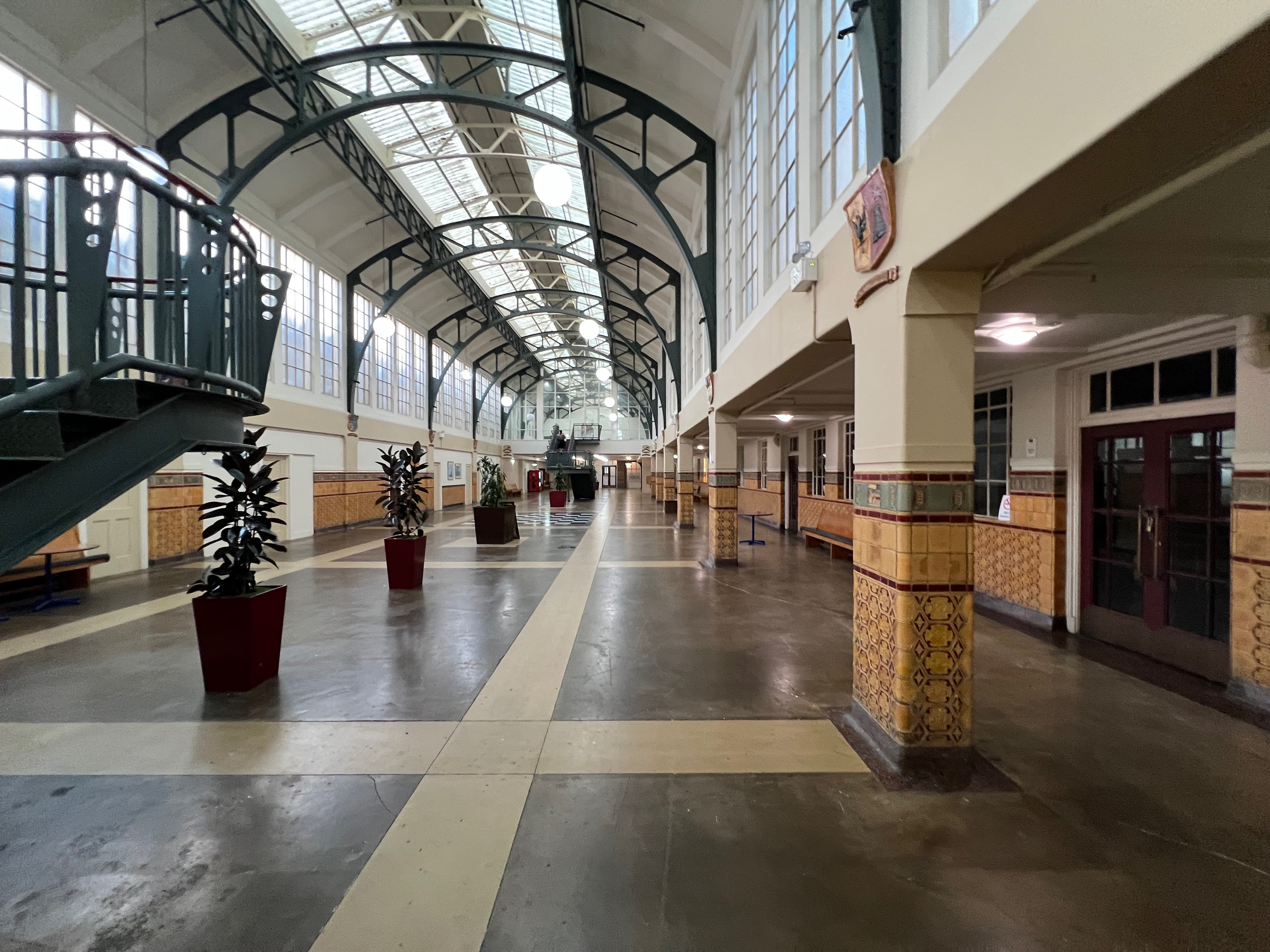
Former concourse area

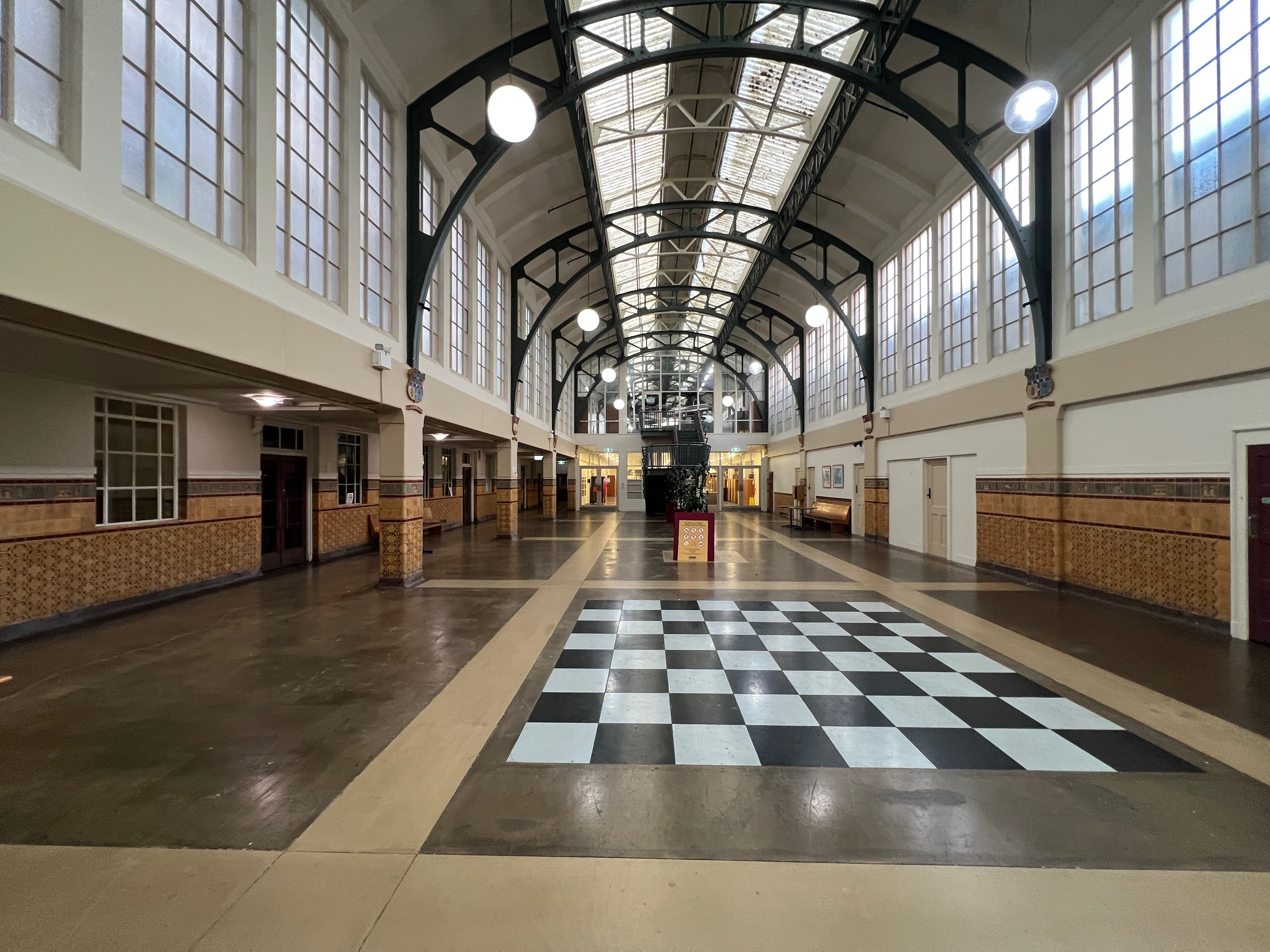
West end of former concourse area

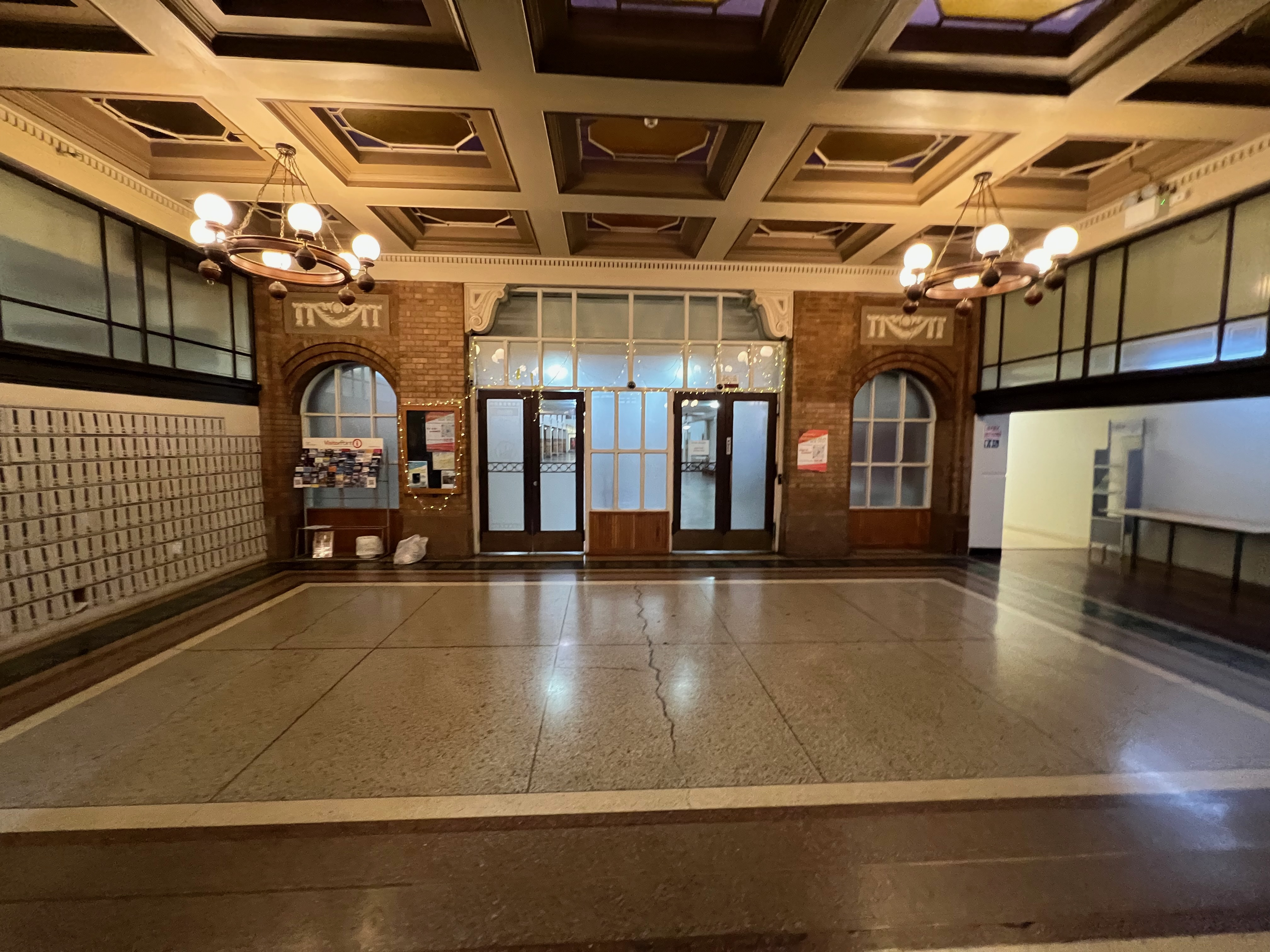
Booking hall

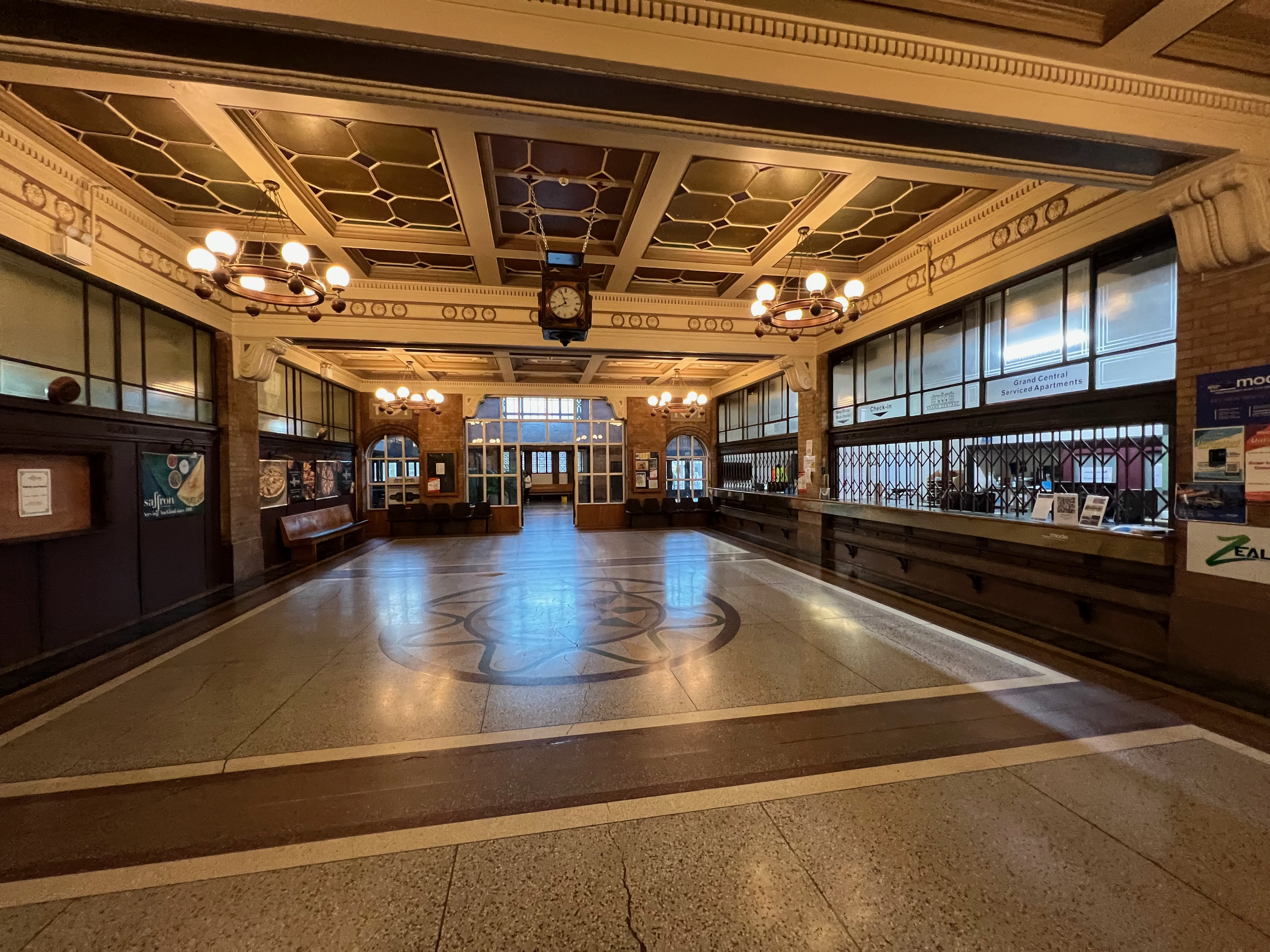
West end of booking hall

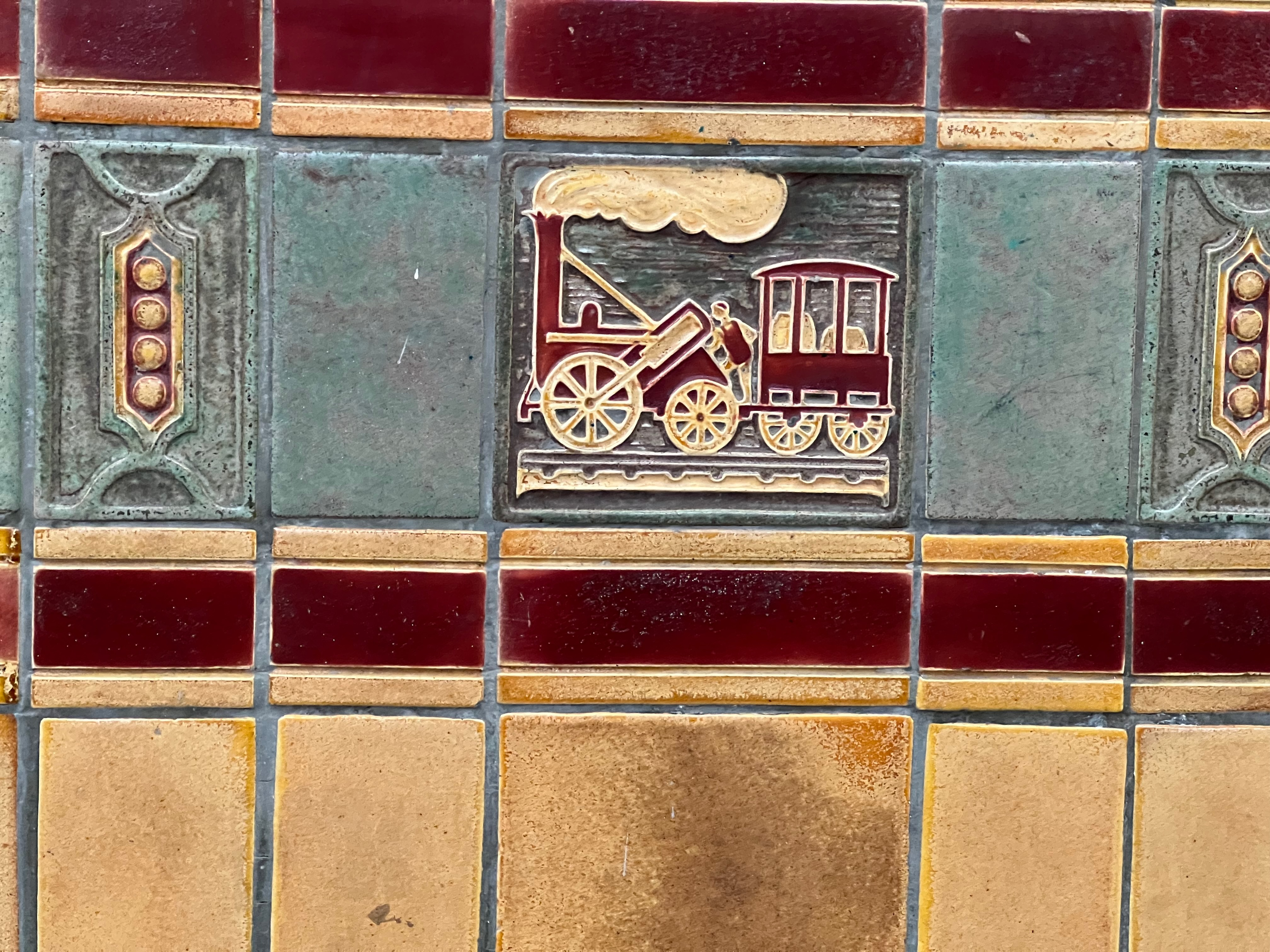
Rocket steam engine tile

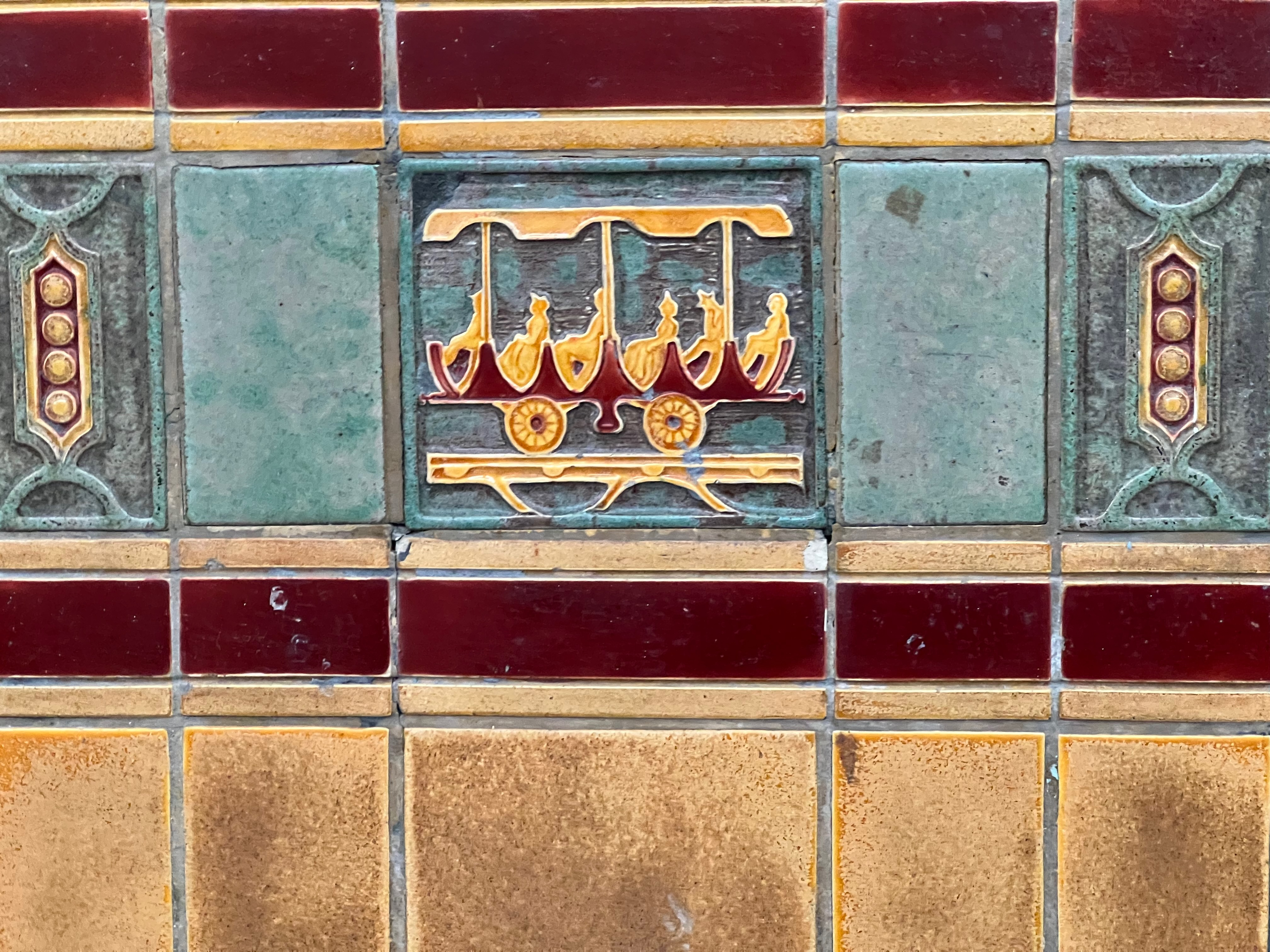
Carriage tile

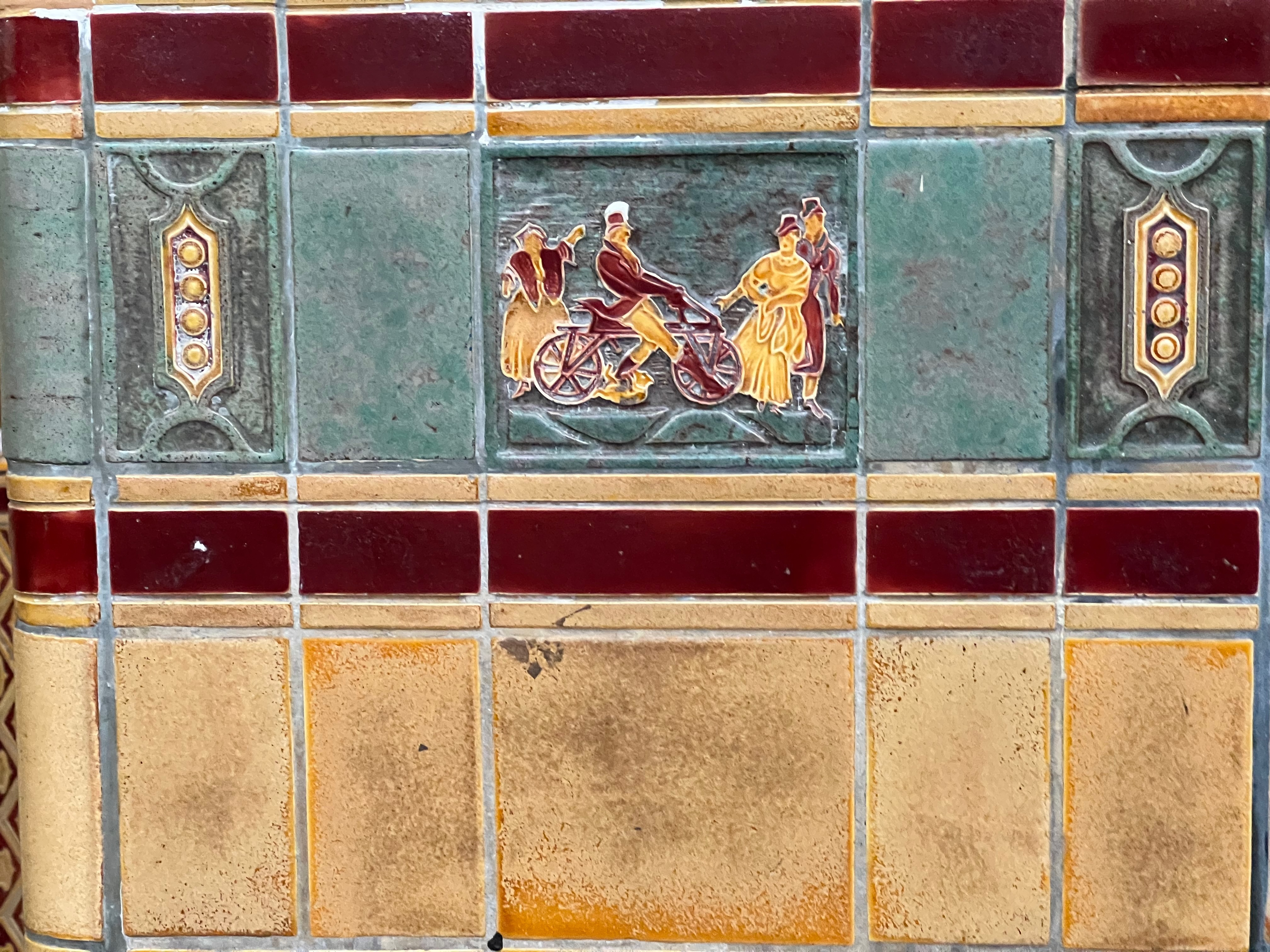
Velocipede tile

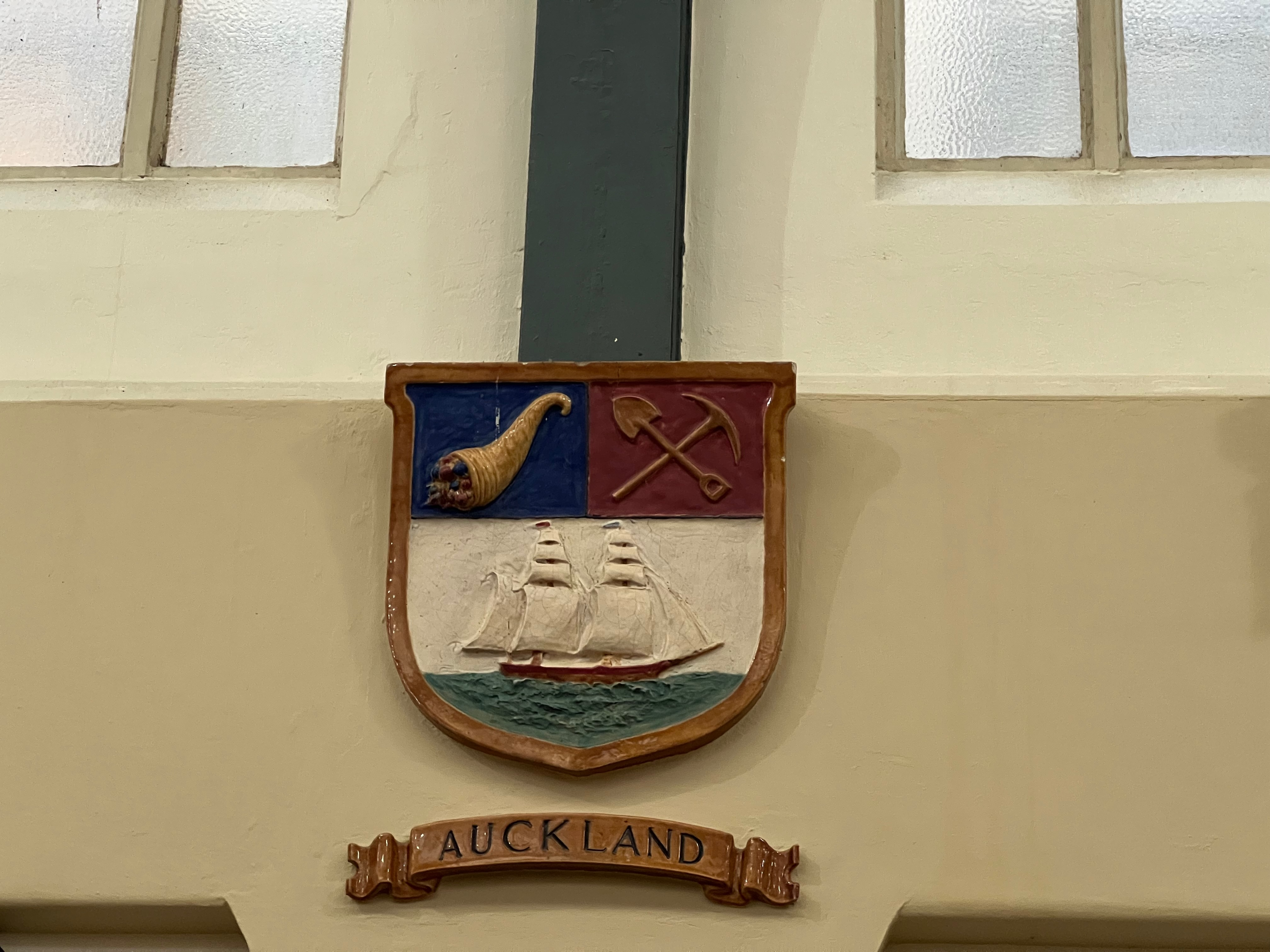
Auckland coat of arms

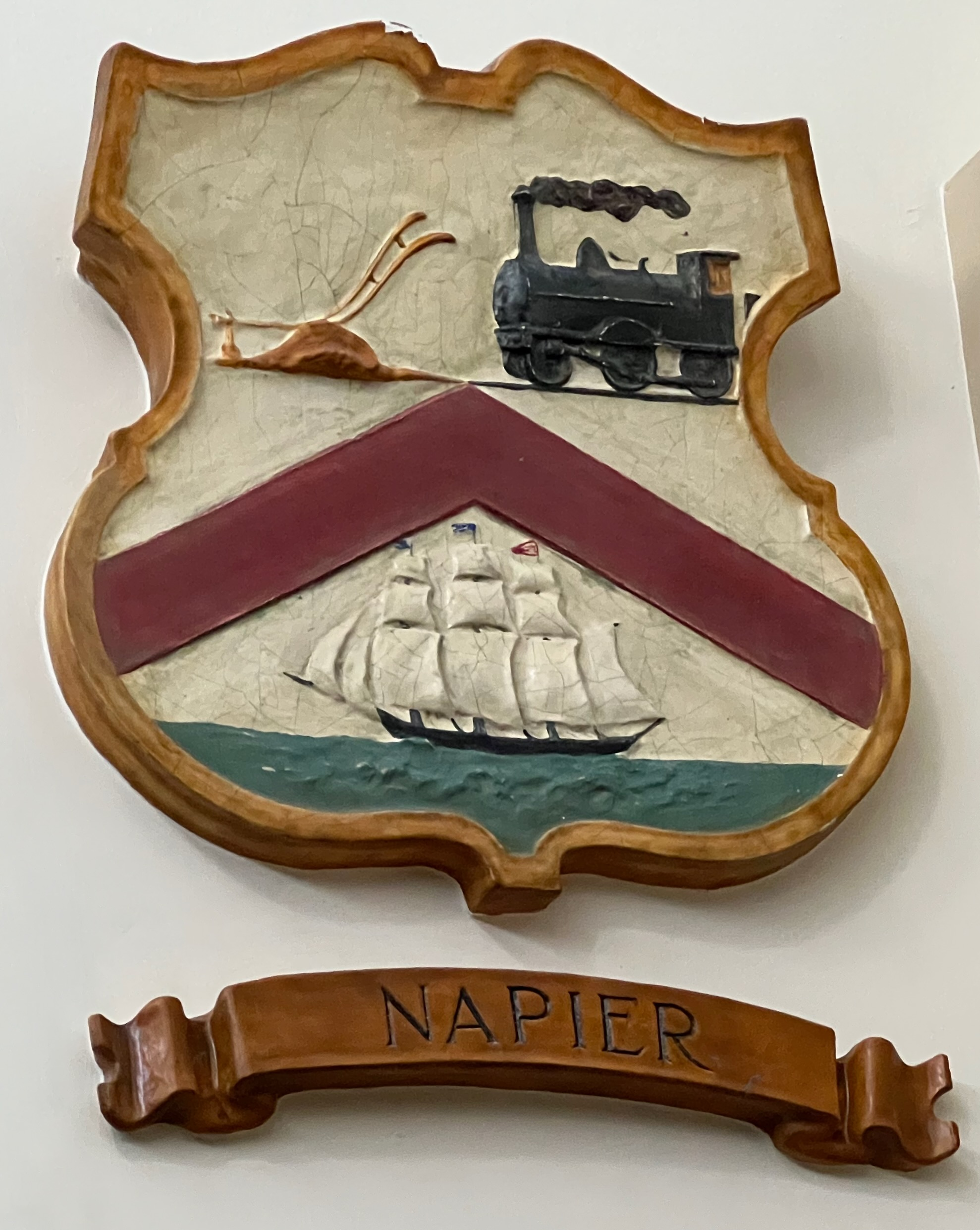
Napier coat of arms

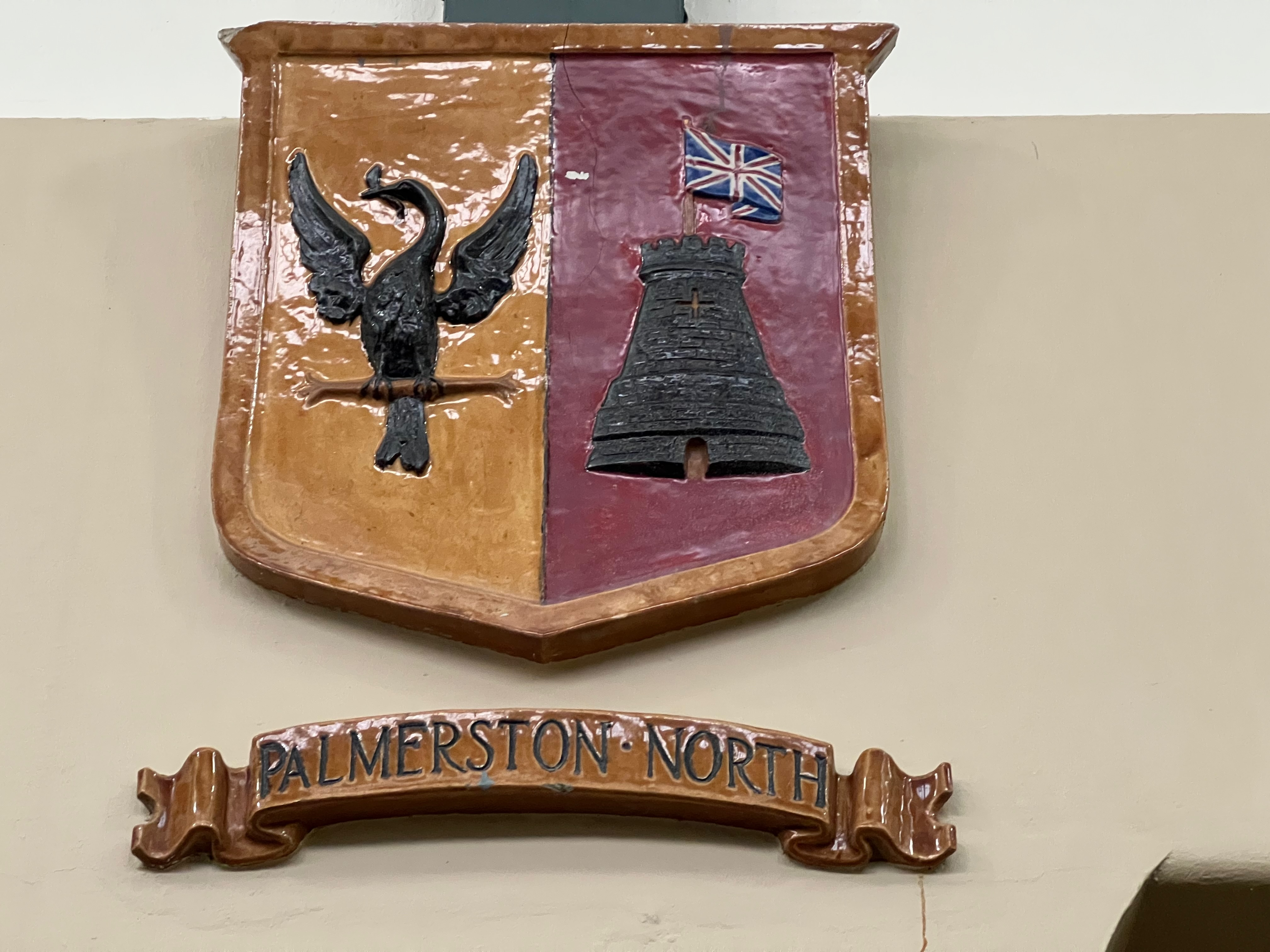
Palmerston North coat of arms

== In popular culture ==
The station featured in the 1984 film Merry Christmas, Mr. Lawrence, starring David Bowie, as the location of a military tribunal set in Batavia, Dutch East Indies.
