= Reginald Ford =

New Zealand architect (1880–1972)

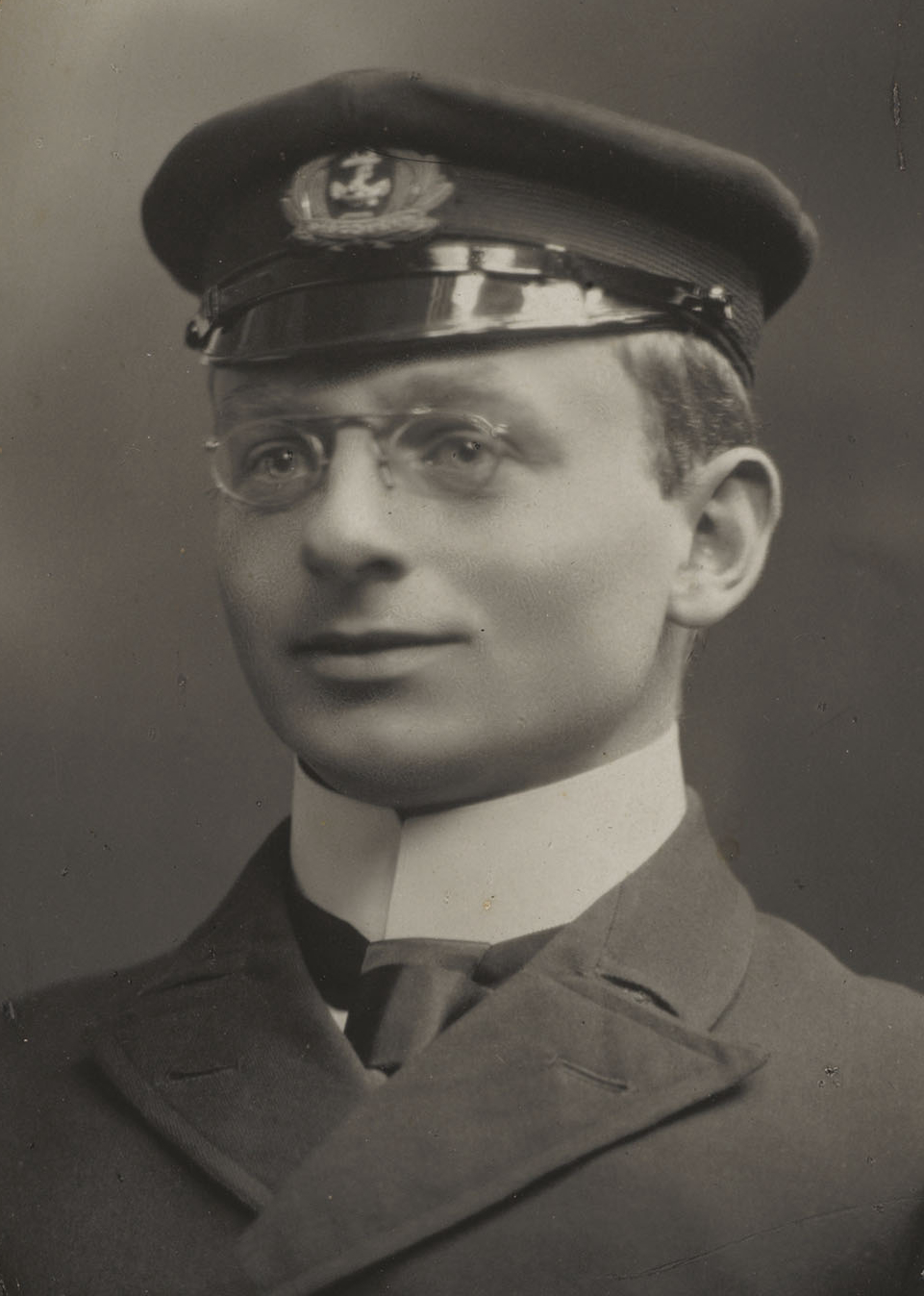
Ford in naval uniform

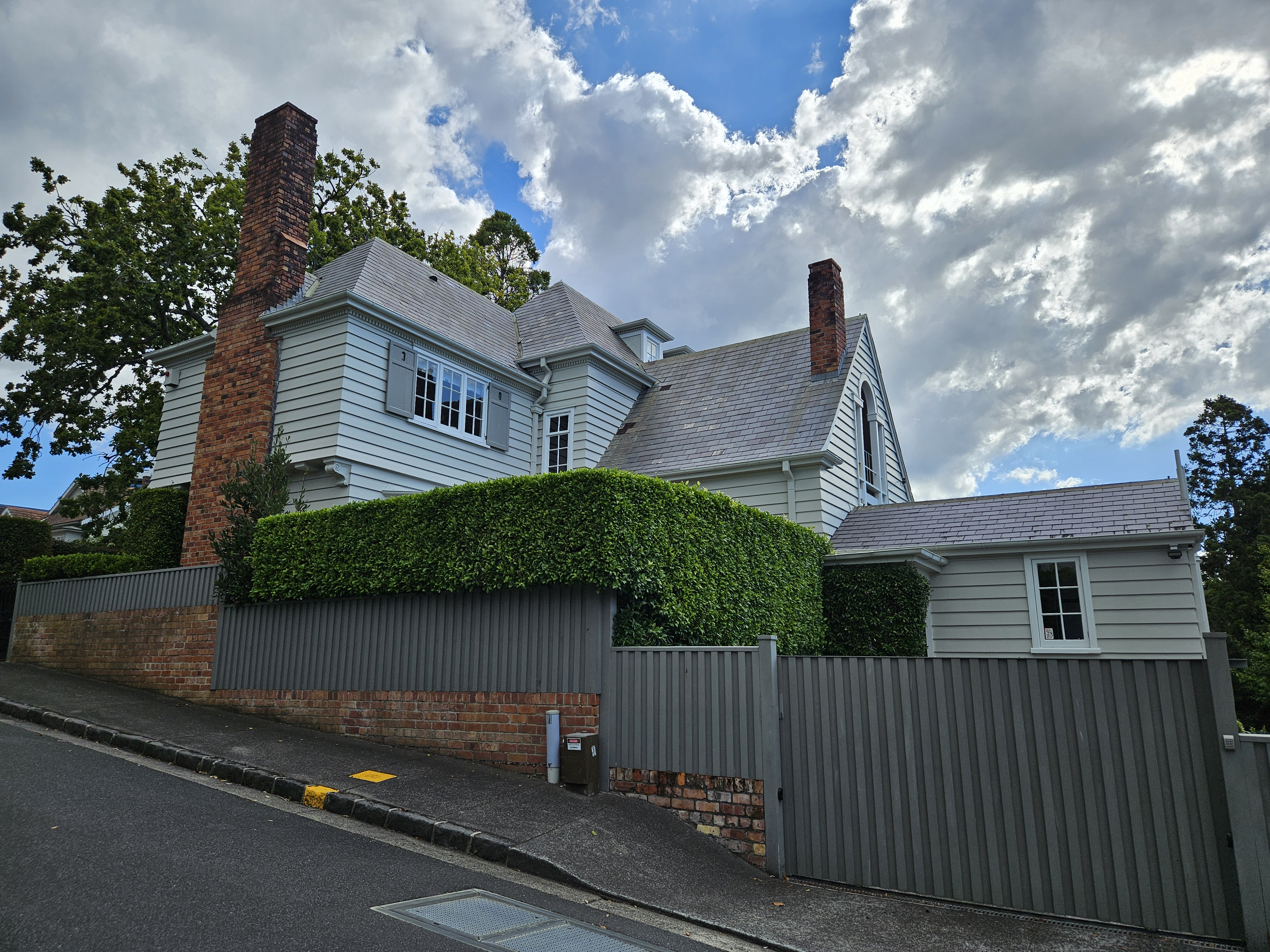
Ford's former residence in Remuera, Auckland, which he designed himself

Charles Reginald Ford (4 February 1880 – 19 May 1972) was a New Zealand explorer, land agent and architect. He was born in London, England on 4 February 1880. Ford served in the Royal Navy and participated in the Discovery Expedition to Antarctica. Ford wrote the first English language treatise on earthquakes and construction. From 1921 to 1922, Ford served as president of the New Zealand Institute of Architects.

== See also ==
- Gummer and Ford
