= Dilworth Building =

Historic building in Auckland, New Zealand

Coordinates: 36.844946°S 174.766785°E

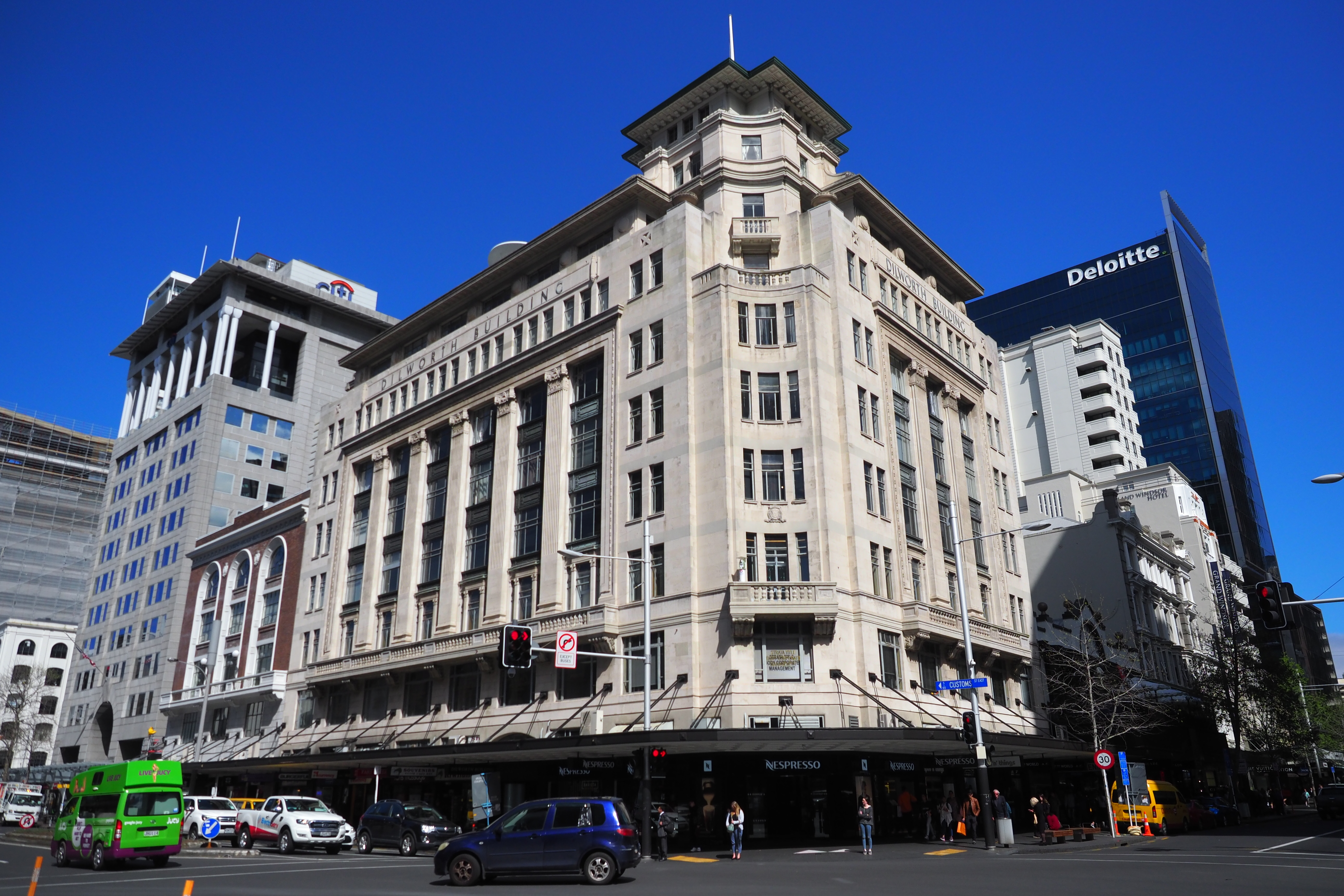
- The building seen from the north-west.
- Interactive map of the Dilworth Building area

General information
- Type: Mixed-use
- Architectural style: Neo-classical
- Location: Corner of Customs Street and Queen Street
- Inaugurated: 1927

Design and construction
- Architect: William Gummer & Reginald Ford

Heritage New Zealand – Category 1
- Designated: 18 May 1989
- Reference no.: 4600

The Dilworth Building is a heritage mixed-use (residential apartments and shops on the ground floor) building at the corner of Customs Street and Queen Street in the Auckland CBD, New Zealand. The building by William Gummer & Reginald Ford was constructed between 1925 and 1927, and is listed as a Category I Historic building by Heritage New Zealand.

At the lower entry to Queen Street, the building was once envisaged as one half of a 'gateway' to the city, and hailed as a visionary concept. However, the mirroring building on the opposite side of Queen Street was never constructed.

== History ==
The building was constructed at the behest of James Dilworth as a rental property to help fund students at the Dilworth Ulster Institute (which later became Dilworth School). Originally the Dilworth Trust Board office was on the 9th floor (with a mezzanine floor) while the rest of the building was let out to tenants. The building was sold by the Dilworth Trust in the 1980s, but it still retains some of the original interiors.

It has housed the American consulate, and during World War II served as headquarters for the U.S. Army.

== Gallery ==
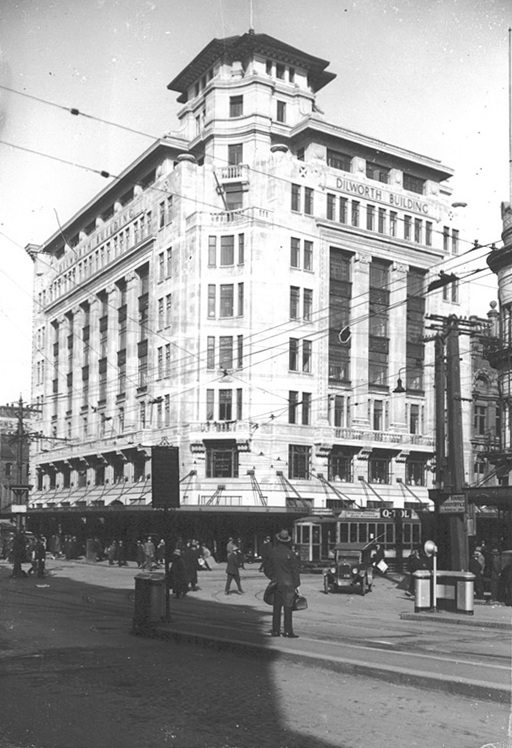
The Dilworth Building in 1928

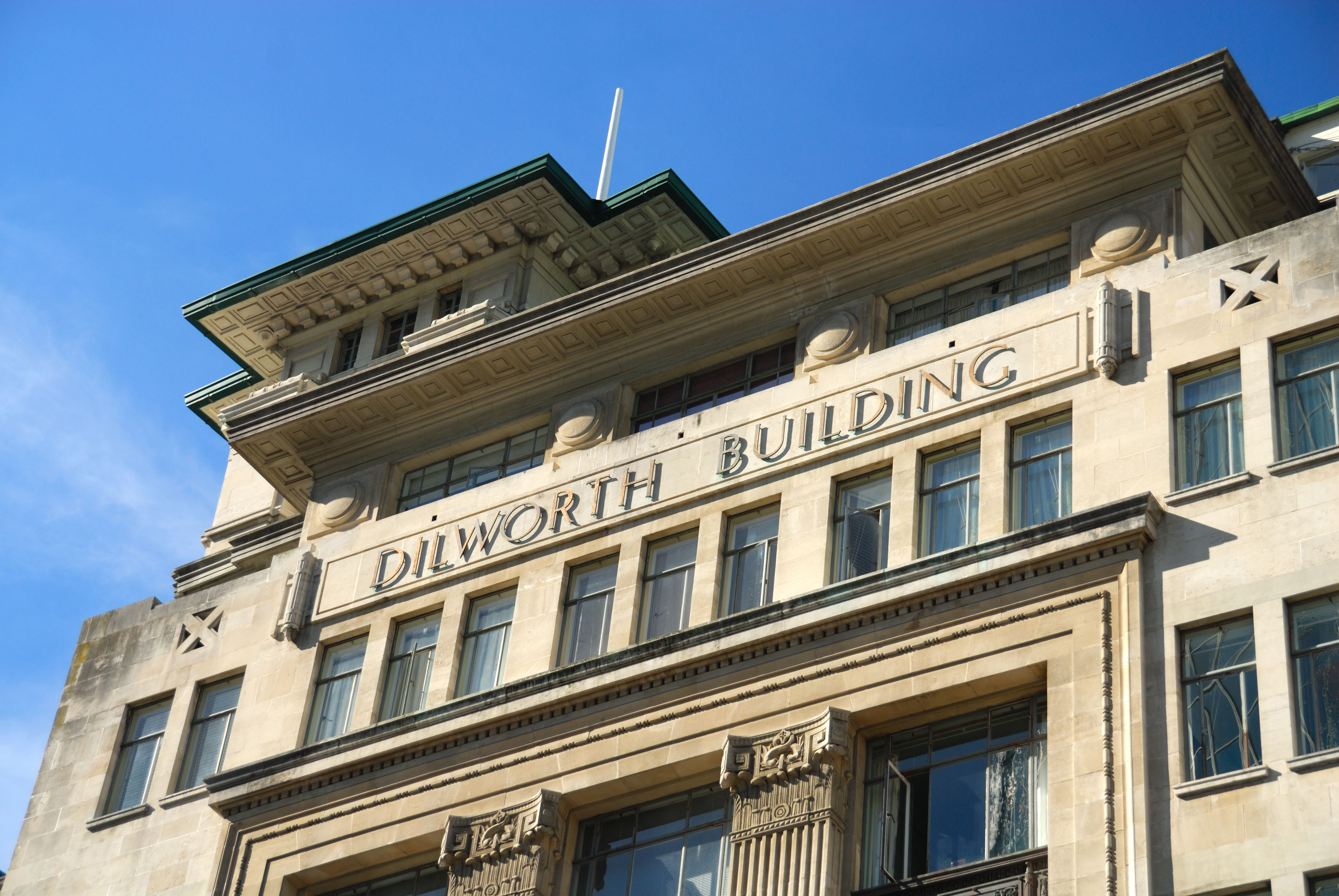
Decorative elements on the upper floors

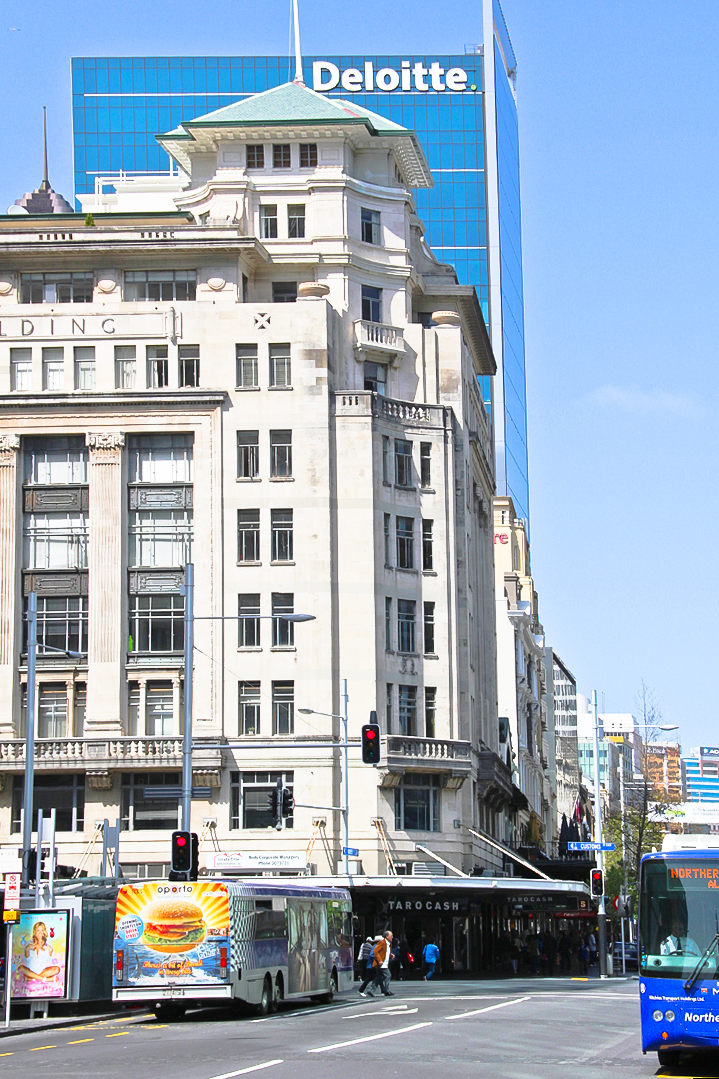
View of the Dilworth Building from the north
