= 1987 Birthday Honours (New Zealand) =

Awards list for New Zealand

The 1987 Queen's Birthday Honours in New Zealand, celebrating the official birthday of Elizabeth II, were appointments made by the Queen in her right as Queen of New Zealand, on the advice of the New Zealand government, to various orders and honours to reward and highlight good works by New Zealanders. They were announced on 13 June 1987.

The recipients of honours are displayed here as they were styled before their new honour.

== Knight Bachelor ==
- Makere Rangiatea Ralph Love QSO JP – of Petone. For services to the Māori people and the community.
- The Honourable Joseph Augustine Ongley – of Lower Hutt; lately a judge of the High Court.
- Clifford George Skeggs JP – of Dunedin; mayor of the City of Dunedin.
- Dr The Honourable Gerard Aloysius Wall MP – of Wellington; Speaker of the House of Representatives.
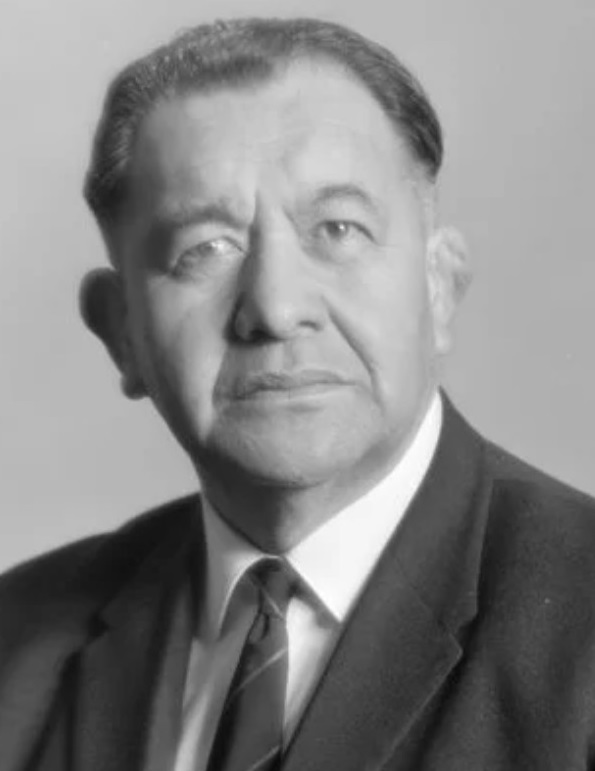
Sir Ralph Love

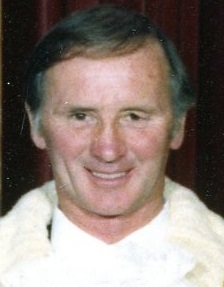
Sir Cliff Skeggs

== Order of Saint Michael and Saint George ==
=== Companion (CMG) ===
- Professor Robert McDonald Chapman – of Auckland. For public services.
- The Honourable Philip North Holloway – of Auckland. For public services.
- Professor Keith Westhead Thomson MBE – of Palmerston North. For services to the arts, especially as chairman, National Art Gallery, Museum and War Memorial.
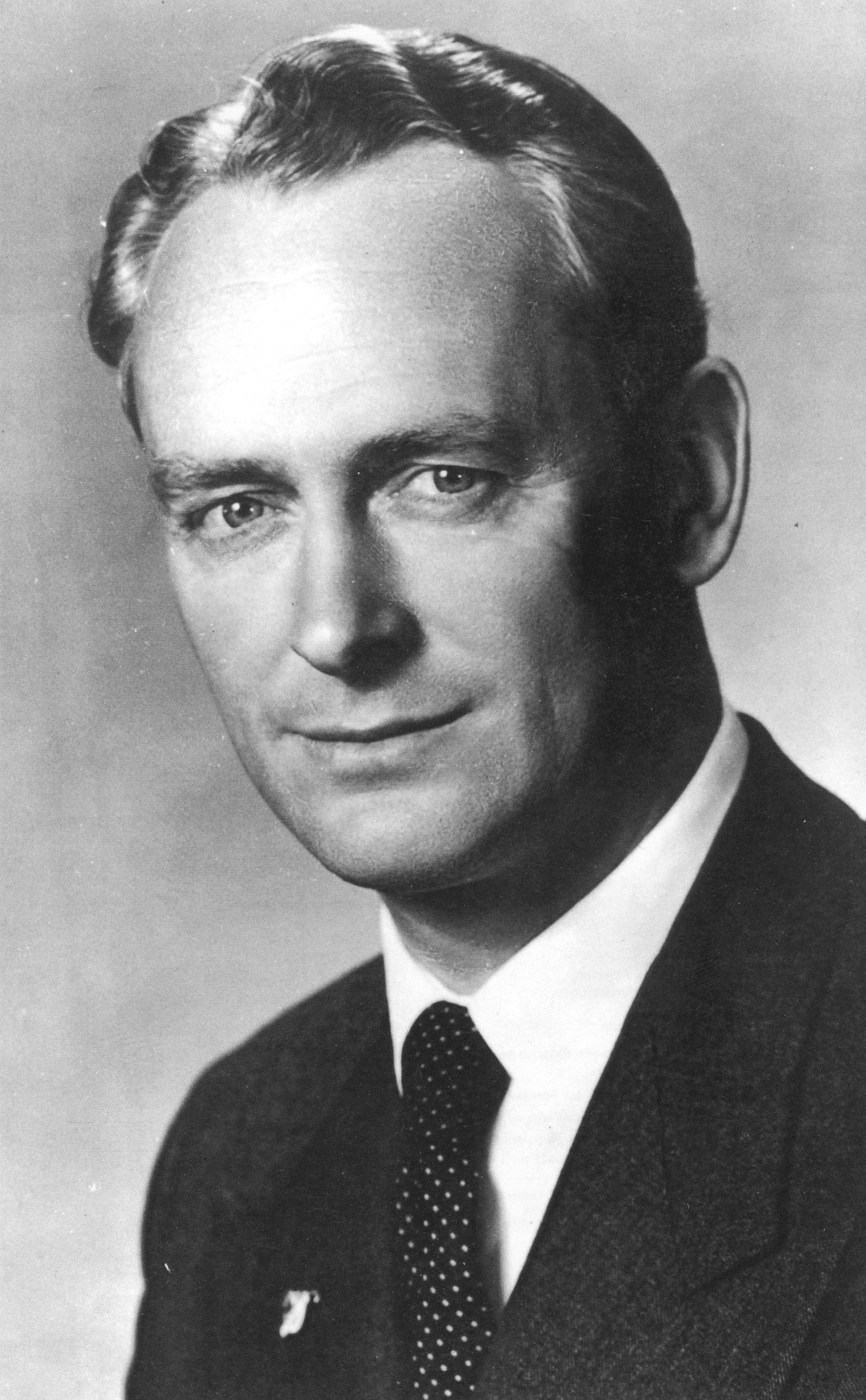
Phil Holloway

== Order of the British Empire ==
=== Dame Commander (DBE) ===
Civil division

- Dr (Alice) Joan Metge – of Wellington. For services to anthropology.

=== Knight Commander (KBE) ===
Civil division

- William Maxwell Manchester CBE – of Auckland. For services to medicine, especially plastic and reconstruction surgery.

=== Commander (CBE) ===
Civil division

- Joan Marian Anderson – of Auckland. For services to the Presbyterian Church of New Zealand.
- John Alexander Lowbridge Bennett – of Palmerston North. For services to the racing industry.
- Te Autiti Rangitahi Eruera-Wikiriwhi – of Rotorua. For services to the Māori people.
- Richard Keith Eunson – of Dunedin. For services to journalism and the community.
- Brian McClelland QC – of Christchurch. For services to the law.
- Edward David Nathan JP – of Dargaville. For services to the Māori people and the community.
- Ernest Ormrod MBE – of Wellington. For services to brass bands.
- Florence Eileen (Peggy) Ziesler – of Auckland. For services to welfare agencies.

=== Officer (OBE) ===
Civil division

- Professor Cyril John Adcock – of Wellington. For services to education and psychology. (Note: Deceased 5 June 1987. Her Majesty's approval of this award was signified before the date of decease.)
- Ivan Clifton Cook – of Christchurch. For services to music.
- Marilyn Duckworth – of Wellington. For services to literature.
- Peter William Fitzsimmons – of Auckland. For services to surf lifesaving and water safety.
- Charles Gordon Gibbs JP – of Wanganui. For services to the community.
- James Francis Glynn – deputy assistant commissioner, New Zealand Police.
- William John Hall – of Hamilton. For services to export and the community.
- Mita Robert Hoturoa Henare – of Wellington; lately deputy general manager, New Zealand Railways.
- Albert Francis Arthur Lofley Jones – of Nelson. For services to astronomy.
- Allan Wilfrid Martin – of Auckland. For services to broadcasting.
- Ernest Henry Moston – of Lower Hutt. For services to sport and the community.
- Lindo Erle Patchett – of Raumati Beach. For services to education.
- Daniel Charles Joseph Pearce – of Dunedin. For services to the Otago Hospital Board.
- Michael Allan Shanahan – of Auckland. For services to the community.
- Jean Elizabeth Stevens JP – of Balfour. For services to the Country Women's Institutes.
- Keith John Stinson – of Hastings. For services to the newspaper industry, Catholic education and the community.
- Douglas Clarence Wilson – of Rangiora. For services to sport.

Military division

- Captain Christopher John Carl – Royal New Zealand Navy.
- Colonel Anthony Leonard Birks MBE – Colonels' List, New Zealand Army.
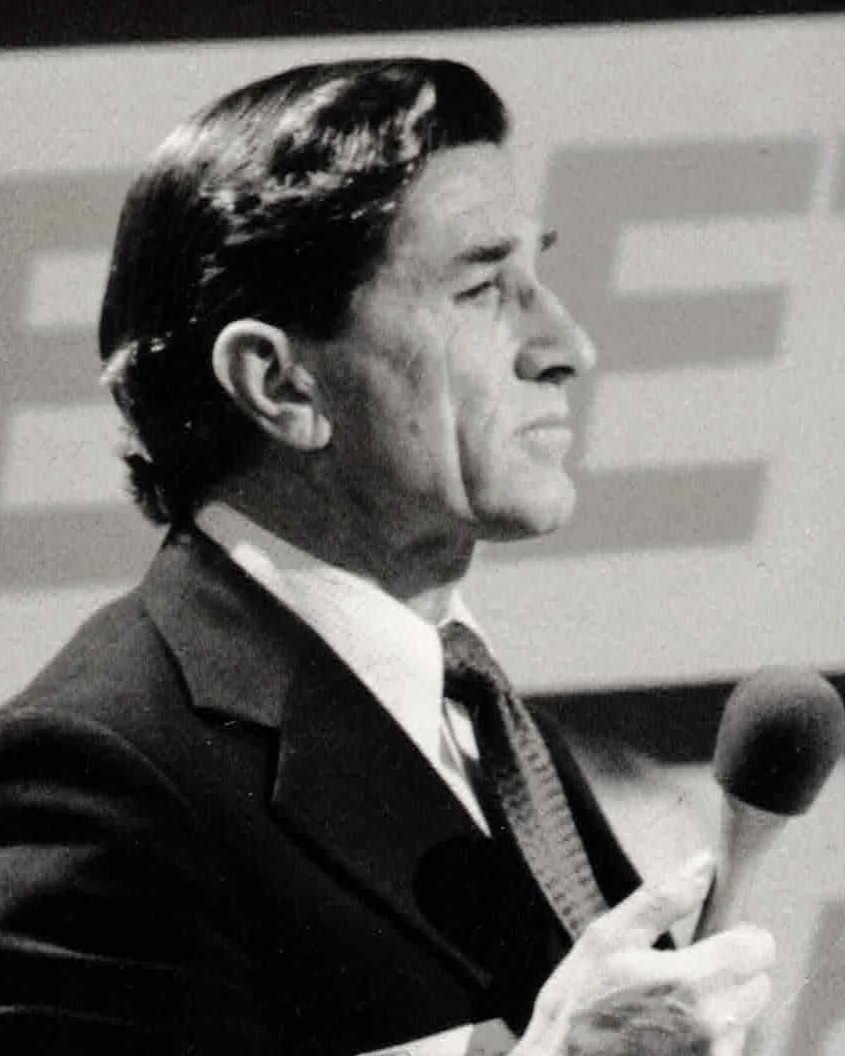
Allan Martin

=== Member (MBE) ===
Civil division

- Dr Raymond Wilkie Brougham – of Palmerston North. For services to agricultural science.
- Donald St Clair Brown – of Auckland. For services to yachting.
- Elisabeth Joyce Campbell – of Wellington. For services to local-body and community affairs.
- Gerald Stanley Clark – of Kerikeri. For services to ornithology.
- Taelomu Louisa Crawley – of Wellington. For services to Polynesian education and employment programmes.
- Christopher Stuart Dickson – of Auckland. For services to yachting.
- Donald Ewart Donnithorne – of Christchurch. For services to architecture.
- Stephanie Charlene Foster – of Wellington. For services to rowing.
- William Murray Gallagher – of Hamilton. For services to export.
- Henry Ballinger Gore – of Wellington; assistant chief traffic superintendent, Ministry of Transport.
- Rae (Charlie) Honetana – of Opua. For services to the Māori people and the community.
- Ronald John Johnstone – of Gisborne. For services to soccer.
- Teresa Patricia Pikau Manunui – of Auckland. For services to the care of epileptics.
- Stuart William McMillan – of Christchurch. For services to journalism.
- Cecil Ralph Mountford – of Auckland. For services to rugby league.
- Henry Robinson – of Auckland. For services to the trade-union movement and the community.
- James Newton Rolfe – of Hamilton. For services to education.
- Lewis Arthur Skudder – of Rotorua; lately acting conservator of forests, New Zealand Forest Service, Rotorua.
- Kenneth James Smith – of Auckland. For services to motor sport.
- The Reverend Te Whakaotinga Ronald Smith – of Matamata. For services to the Māori people.
- Dr Margaret June Sparrow – of Wellington. For services to medicine and the community.
- Dr Hamish Russell Thompson – of Wellington; lately chief director, Department of Scientific and Industrial Research.
- John Penman Turner – of Auckland. For services to horticulture and export.
- Georgina Russell Webster – of Invercargill. For services to the community.
- Helen Agnes Young – of Wellington. For services to broadcasting.

Military division

- Major Malcolm Robert Newton de Joux – Royal New Zealand Infantry Regiment.
- Warrant Officer Malcolm Eric Hume – Royal New Zealand Air Force.
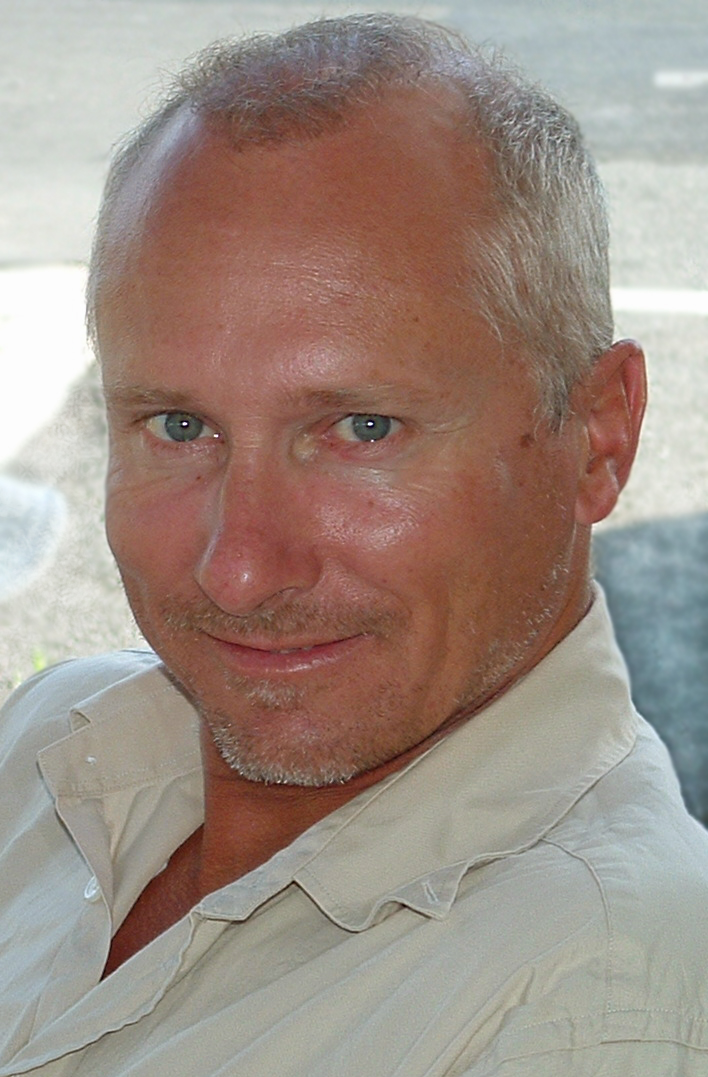
Chris Dickson

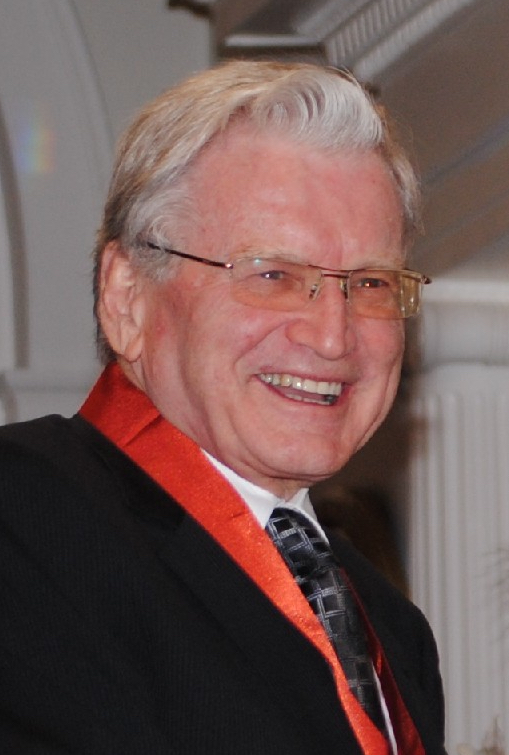
Bill Gallagher

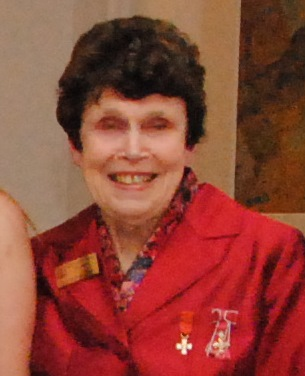
Margaret Sparrow

== British Empire Medal (BEM) ==
Military division

- Warrant Officer Radio Electrical Artificer Roger Owen Edward Western – Royal New Zealand Navy.
- Warrant Officer Class II Alec Manu Lee – Royal New Zealand Infantry Regiment.
- Staff Sergeant (Temporary Warrant Officer Class II) Dennis James Madden – Royal New Zealand Electrical and Mechanical Engineers.
- Corporal Brian Paul Richard – Royal New Zealand Air Force.

== Companion of the Queen's Service Order (QSO) ==
=== For community service ===
- The Reverend Ahiwera Awatere – of Ruatoria.
- Noeline Jean Colman – of Wainuiomata.
- Hugh William Kelly – of Wellington. (Note: Deceased 2 June 1987. Her Majesty's approval of this award was signified before the date of decease.)
- Anne Barbara Noonan – of Christchurch.
- Puti Puti O'Brien – of Te Teko.
- The Reverend Father Joseph Wolff Shepherd – of Auckland.

=== For public services ===
- The Honourable Ronald Leslie Bailey JP – of Auckland.
- Mary Dorothy Batchelor MP – of Christchurch.
- William Hector Carson MP – of Wellington.
- The Honourable Warren Wilfred Freer – of Auckland.
- Patricia Mary Harrison – of Dunedin.
- John Finlay Luxton MP – of Morrinsville.
- The Honourable James Kenneth McLay MP – of Auckland.
- Robert Owen Williams – of Lower Hutt; lately assistant secretary (penal), Department of Justice head office.
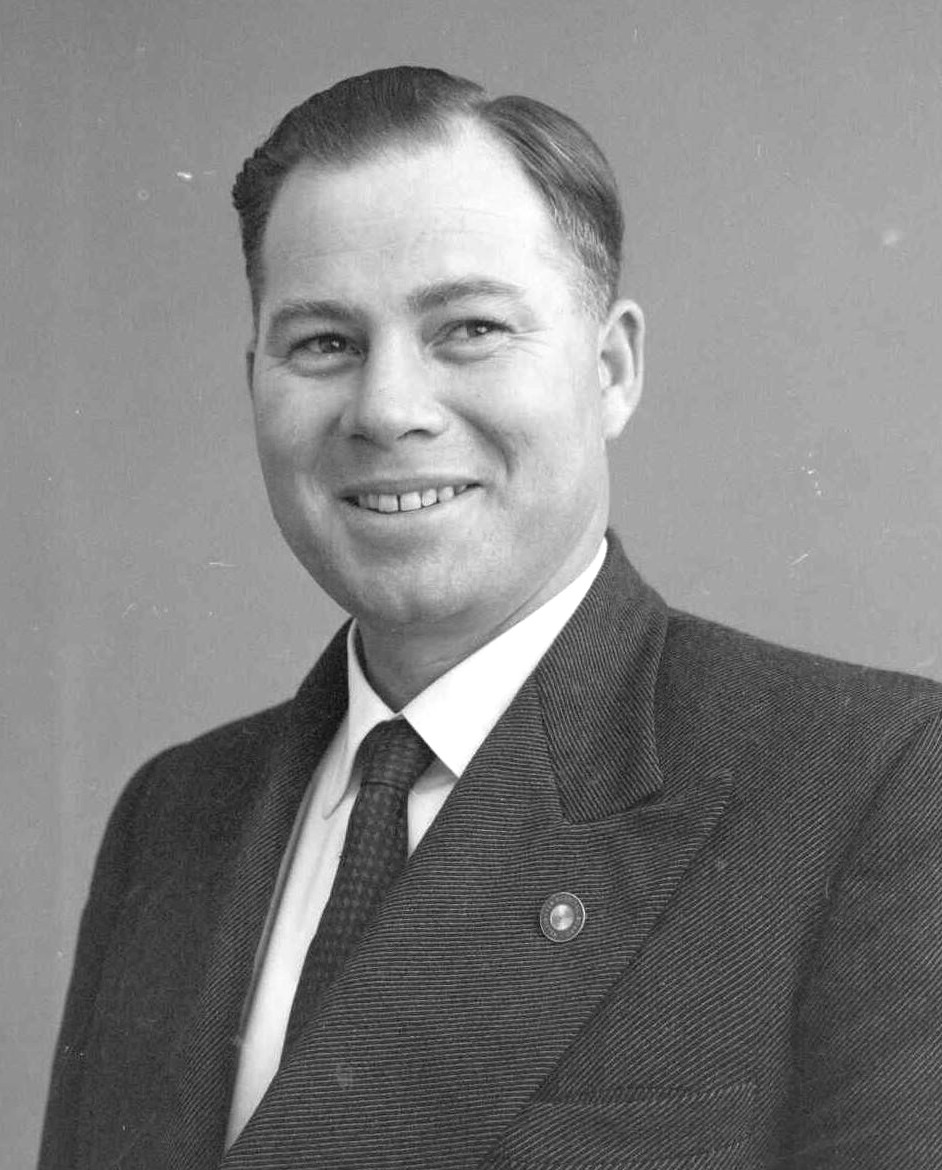
Ron Bailey

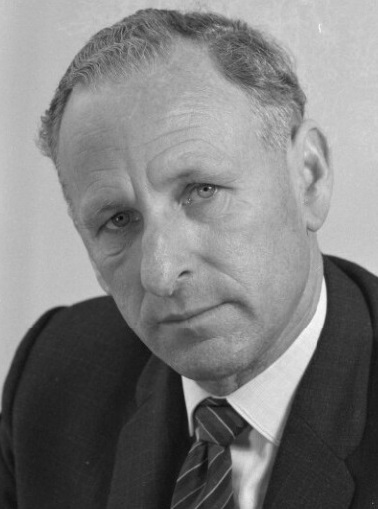
Warren Freer

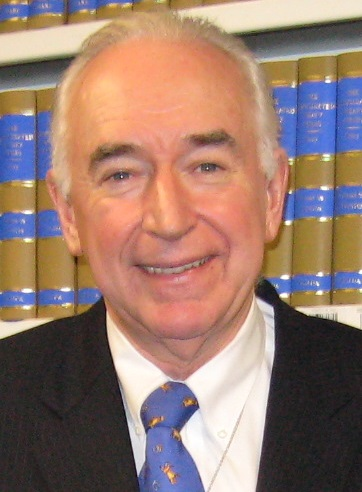
Jim McLay

== Queen's Service Medal (QSM) ==
=== For community service ===
- Bernal Gerard Allen – of Auckland.
- Leonora Bickley – of Tākaka.
- Molly Ford Donnelly – of Christchurch.
- Melvan Earle Driscoll – of Hamilton.
- Richard John Dunn – of Masterton.
- William Elliott – of Ohai.
- Marianne Graham – of Palmerston North.
- William Thomas Gray – of Nelson.
- Bernard James Joseph Guerin – of Greymouth.
- Priscilla Haulund-Christensen – of Auckland.
- Hoani John Heremaia – of Pātea.
- Te Puoho Katene – of Porirua.
- George Frederick Kaye – of Lower Hutt.
- Marie Louise Kerkham – of Auckland.
- Jack Larkins – of Kaitaia.
- James William Low – of Auckland.
- Elizabeth McGibbon Lee McBeth – of Reefton.
- Marjorie Ellen McCreanor – of Christchurch.
- Heather Louis Muriel Mason – of Masterton.
- Thelma May – of Christchurch.
- Józef Ludwik Mendruń – of Wellington.
- Nora Nixon – of Bucklands Beach.
- Alan Stuart Norman JP – of Rodney County.
- Basil Spyros Papageorgiou JP – of Wellington.
- Dr Clara Elizabeth Rawley – of Raglan.
- Ernest William Rodgers – of Christchurch.
- Harry John Sakkers – of Nightcaps.
- Te Awhina Olive Seymour – of Waitangi, Chatham Islands.
- Pauline Eunice Tangiora – of Woodville.
- Te Rino Tirikatene JP – of Wellington.
- Edwin John Charles Townshend – of Paeroa.
- Betty May Turnbull – of Te Anau.
- Philip Alexander Chatton Turnbull JP – of Te Anau.
- Cyril Vincent Walter – of Christchurch.

=== For public services ===
- Arthur Alexandra Adcock – of Christchurch.
- Elaine Elisapeta Uluave Annandale JP – of Porirua East.
- Peter Brian Ashworth – of Auckland.
- Alexandra McKay (Sandra) Averi – of Wellington.
- Raymond Arthur Braithwaite JP – of Auckland.
- Edward Robert Brown – of Hastings.
- Robert Douglas Christie JP – of Upper Hutt.
- Dr William Lawrence Daniels – of Auckland.
- Thomas Dennis – senior constable, New Zealand Police.
- Murray George Dunn – of Auckland.
- Verona Amelia Edwards – of Auckland; charge sister, plastic surgical unit, Middlemore Hospital.
- Barbara Yvonne Fisher JP – of Te Karaka.
- Peter Francis Gilfedder – senior constable, New Zealand Police.
- Barrie Bernard Gleeson – of Christchurch.
- Cecil Honeybun – of Waiheke Island.
- Clifford Lorrie Hunter – of Auckland.
- Pauline Beatrice Joblin – senior constable, New Zealand Police.
- John William James Lepper – of Rotorua.
- Olwyn Elizabeth Mason – of Taradale.
- Neil Shaw Menzies – senior constable, New Zealand Police.
- John Michael Miratana – of Wellington.
- Joseph Teotane Reti – of Napier.
- Arthur Ricketts – of Auckland; lately principal, Owairaka Boys Home.
- Tutemaeva Ringiao – of Wellington.
- Robert Russell Burrell Robertson JP – of Waimangaroa.
- Rex Raukawa Tawharu – of Waiuku.
- Alex Gowan Taylor – of Hamilton, lately regional executive officer, Ministry of Agriculture and Fisheries, Hamilton.
- James Leonard Titcombe – of Foxton.
- Gordon Raymond Watson – of Dunedin.
- Richard Ernest Williams – of Wellington.
- Trevor Lloyd Williams – of Kaiapoi.
- Zeala Leslie (Cerise) Wise – of Hamilton.
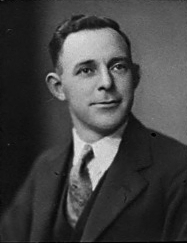
Lorrie Hunter

== Queen's Fire Service Medal (QFSM) ==
- Robert Crowley – fourth officer, Feilding Volunteer Fire Brigade, New Zealand Fire Service.
- James Alexander Deer – senior station officer, Stokes Valley Volunteer Fire Brigade, New Zealand Fire Service.
- Peter Karl Weeks – fire force commander, Commander No. 5 Region, New Zealand Fire Service.

== Air Force Cross (AFC) ==
- Squadron Leader Brian Neil Phillips – Royal New Zealand Air Force.
