= Kingsley Baird =

New Zealand artist

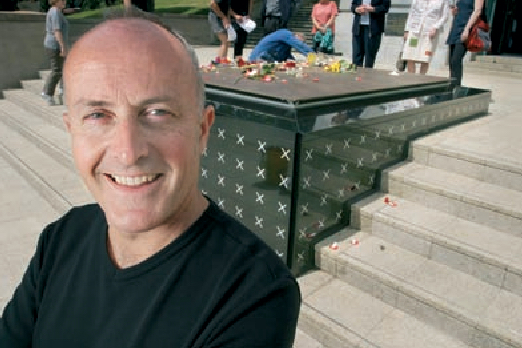
- Baird in 2007 in front of the Tomb of the Unknown Warrior
- Born: 1957 (age 68–69); Wellington, New Zealand
- Education: RMIT University; Victoria University of Wellington
- Known for: sculpture, design
- Website: www.kingsleybaird.com

Kingsley Baird is a Wellington-based artist and designer whose commissions include the Tomb of the Unknown Warrior at the National War Memorial of New Zealand and Te Korowai Rangimarie – Cloak of Peace – at Nagasaki Peace Park.

His work – primarily in sculpture – is concerned mostly with themes of memory and remembrance, loss and reconciliation, and cultural identity. It comprises collaborative landscape and urban design projects, installation art, video art and painting, as well as community projects. His commissions include the Australia-New Zealand Memorial, Canberra, and the kererū sculpture in Tawa village.

Baird holds a Master of Fine Art degree from RMIT, Melbourne, and a Diploma in Arts from Victoria University of Wellington. He is currently a practising artist and designer, and Professor at the College of Creative Arts, Massey University of Wellington.

== Gallery ==
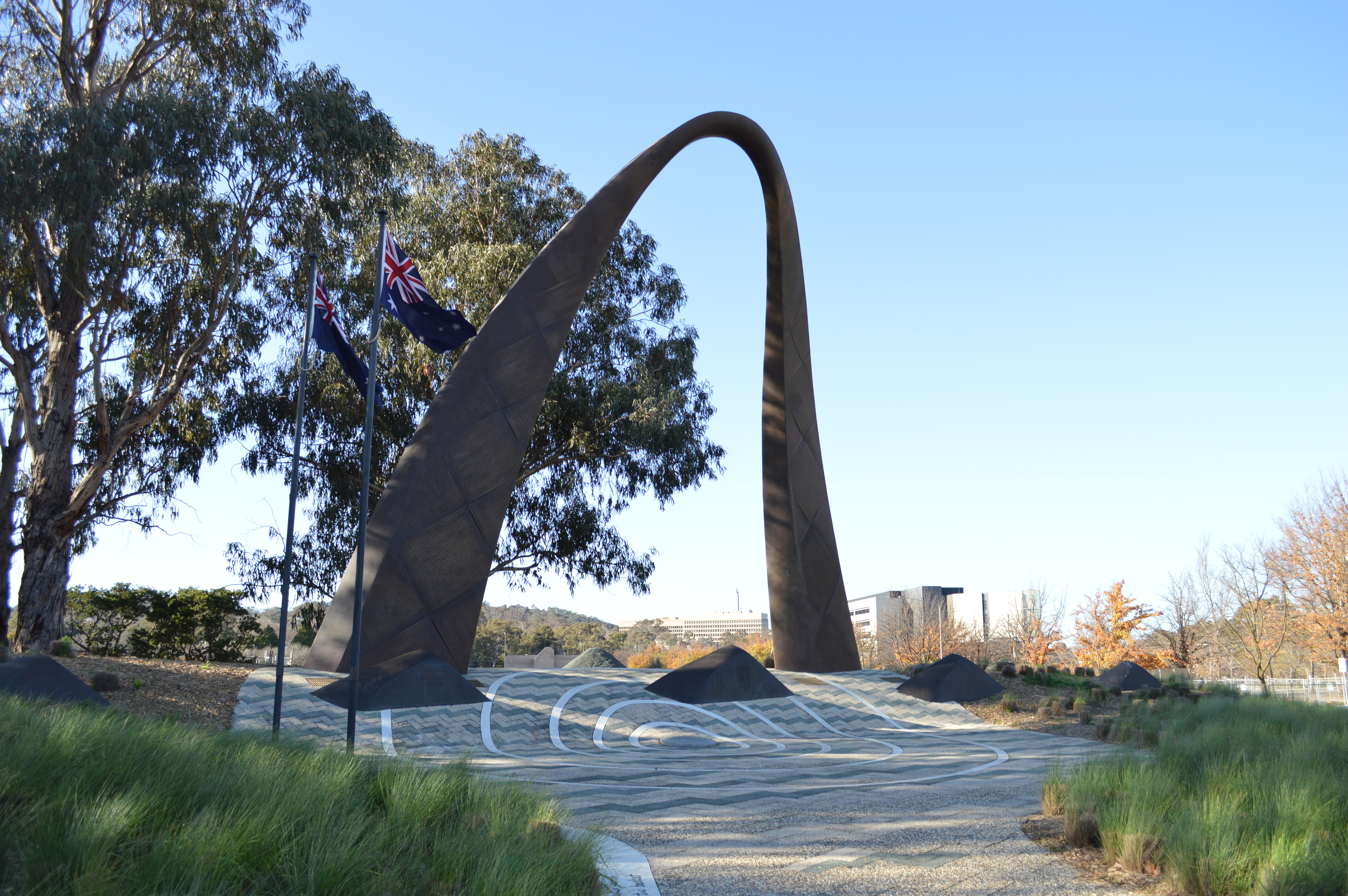
The New Zealand Memorial (2001) in Canberra, Australia

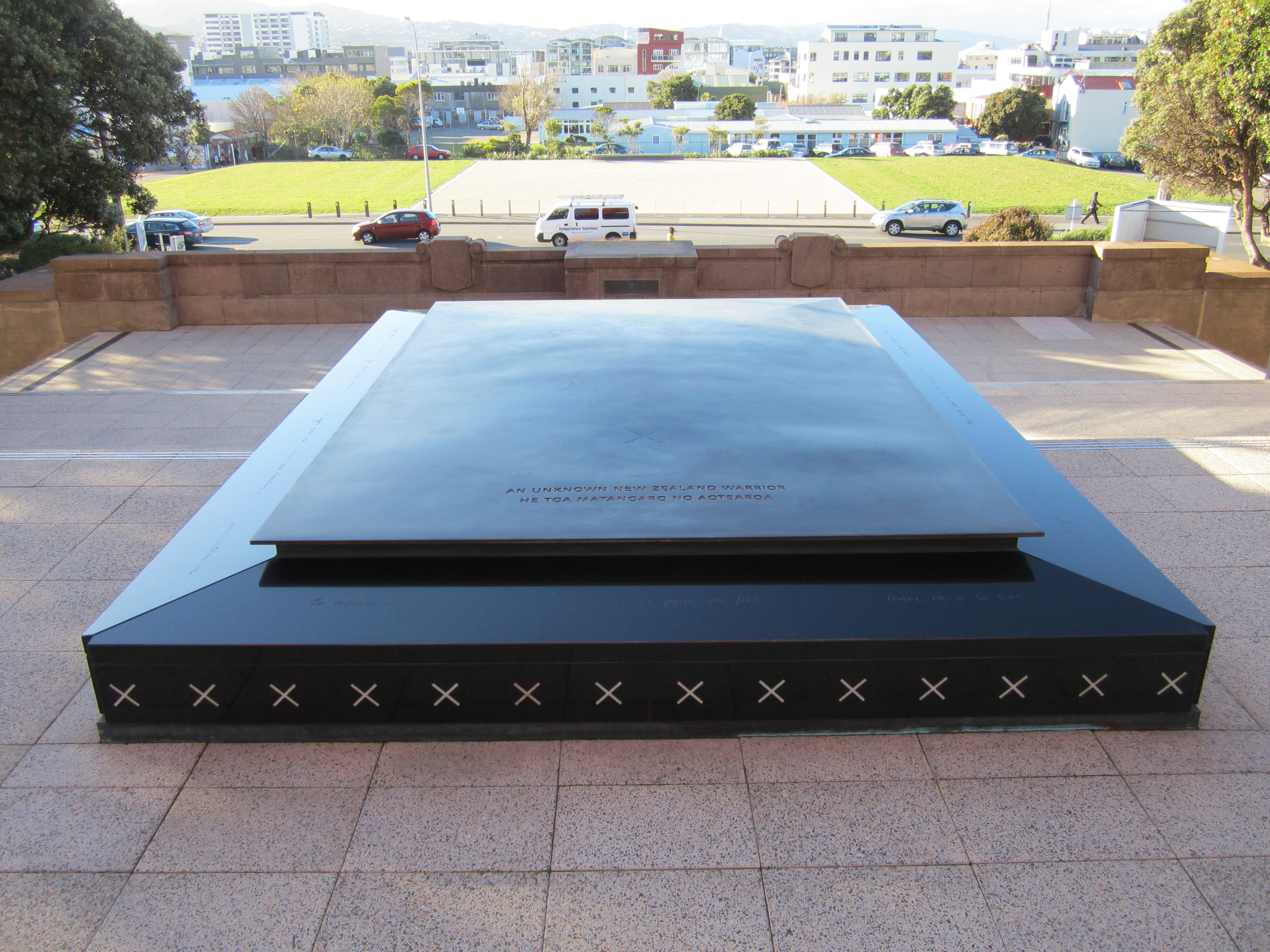
The Tomb of the Unknown Warrior (2004) at the National War Memorial in Wellington
