= Cyril Walter =

New Zealand sportsman

Cyril Vincent Walter QSM (4 December 1912 – 23 March 1988) was a New Zealand hockey player and coach, sports writer, teacher, bookseller. He was born in Nelson, New Zealand, in 1912. He also played in two first-class matches for Canterbury in 1945/46.

In the 1987 Queen's Birthday Honours, Walter was awarded the Queen's Service Medal for community service.
