= Billy Graham (New Zealand boxer) =

New Zealand boxer

Billy Graham MNZM
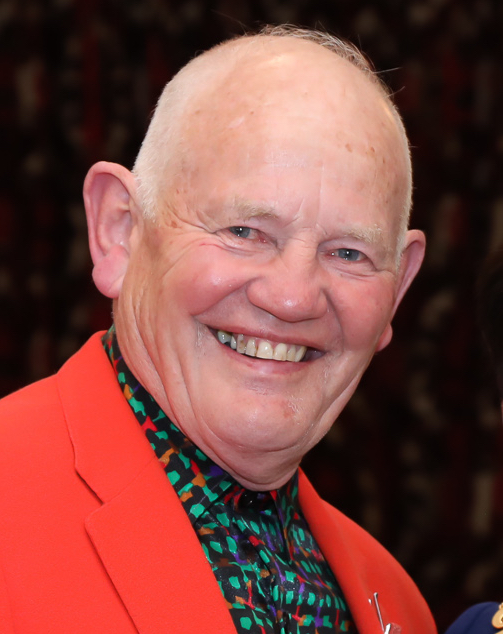
- Graham in 2020

Personal information
- Born: 1947 or 1948 (age 78–79) Naenae, New Zealand
- Weight: Light-welterweight

Boxing career

William Neil Graham MNZM (born 1947 or 1948) is a New Zealand boxing trainer and former amateur boxer. He won four New Zealand titles at light welterweight, plus an Australasian title and the Jamieson Belt.

Born in Naenae, and trained by the legendary Dick Dunn, Graham's amateur career was outstanding. He did not turn pro, but in the late 1960s Bob Jones wrote the following about young Graham:

Wellington boxing fans should mark down young Billy Graham in the back of their minds as a future professional champion who will fill their Town Hall, for the Hutt Valley boxer is showing all the signs of following in the footsteps of two post-war greats in Barry Brown and Manuel Santos. At 18, Billy Graham who in the nick of time for the W.B.A, who currently sadly lacking a local hero, is an amateur prospect with all the necessary qualifications to make the grade in the professional ring after perhaps another year in the amateurs.

When Graham was 28, his coach told him it was time to stop boxing. Graham left boxing after 18 years in the ring without ever having taken a blow to the head. He now runs the Naenae Boxing Academies in Naenae and Cannons creek, These academies help kids of the street and save their childhoods which has gained recognition from several newspapers.

== Honours and awards ==
In 2011, Graham was named the Local Community Hero of the Year at the New Zealander of the Year awards.

In the 2020 Queen's Birthday Honours, Graham was appointed a Member of the New Zealand Order of Merit, for services to youth and the community.
