= Bob Goslin =

New Zealand boxer (1927–1988)

Personal information
- Born: Colin Higgs Goslin; 9 October 1927 Wellington, New Zealand
- Died: 9 October 1988 (aged 61)
- Weight: Super bantamweight

Boxing career
- Stance: Orthodox

Boxing record
- Total fights: 3
- Wins: 1
- Win by KO: 0
- Losses: 2
- Draws: 0
- No contests: 0

Colin Higgs "Bob" Goslin (9 October 1927 – 9 October 1988) represented New Zealand as a featherweight boxer at the 1948 Summer Olympics in London. In that tournament Goslin fought Eddie Johnson (USA) in the round of 32, with Johnson winning by TKO in round three.

Goslin was chosen as part of the Wellington boxing team to fight the US Marines in 1942. Goslin was matched to meet US marine P. Gonsalves, knocking out the American during the first 30 seconds of the match. The team also included Lyn Philp and Jack McCann who both had wins.

== 1948 Olympic results ==
Below is the record of Bob Goslin, a New Zealand featherweight boxer who competed at the 1948 London Olympics:

- Round of 32: Lost to Eddie Johnson (United States) referee stopped contest in the third round

== Professional career ==
Goslin went on to become a professional boxer having three pro bouts with one win and two losses.
