= Johnny Hanks =

New Zealand boxer (1934–2013)

Personal information
- Nationality: New Zealand
- Born: Ramon John Hanks; 6 December 1934 Auckland, New Zealand
- Died: 3 March 2013 (aged 78)
- Weight: Super Featherweight

Boxing career
- Stance: Orthodox

Boxing record
- Total fights: 25
- Wins: 12
- Win by KO: 3
- Losses: 13
- Draws: 0
- No contests: 0

Johnny Hanks (6 December 1934 – 3 March 2013) was a professional boxer who on 14 June 1954 became the New Zealand featherweight champion, and on 16 May 1955 the New Zealand lightweight champion. Trained by Ron Grimmer who also trained Manny Santos and Toro George. Hanks was considered one of the most powerful super featherweight punchers in New Zealand.

- Ranked third best super featherweight New Zealand all-time greats.

== Life & Achievements ==
Aged just five years' Johnny Hanks underwent tonsillectomy surgery twice within a space of few weeks, which not only were unsuccessful but ultimately left him with slurred speech and a heart murmur. There was a third tonsillectomy operation at a private surgery some few years' later after which the Doctor said to his parents "take the wee mite home and let him die in his own bed." Hanks survived and went on to become an amateur then pro boxer.

It was in 1948 when Hanks elder brother Aubrey coaxed Johnny to participate in skipping and light exercises at Auckland's Fire Brigade gymnasium he became interested in boxing. It was during this time he learned boxing skills from the legendary trainer Eugene Donovan who, some months' later, ascertained Hanks good enough to enter competition for novices.

Johnny went on to become the undisputed professional featherweight and lightweight champion of New Zealand, holding both belts concurrently.

After retiring as an active competitor Hanks then became assistant trainer to Ron Grimmer, who was Johnny's trainer when he competed professionally.

Hanks was offered a gym by the ABA of his own and became a fully licensed trainer in 1962. His very first season was instantly successful entering just four from his gym in the 1963 Auckland amateur championships who each won a title in their respective weight class, with one also winning the Most Scientific Boxer trophy and Hanks winning The Most Successful Trainer award. In 1964 Hanks' was the chief corner-man for the ABA when Mr Grimmer was not available.

Hanks published and edited New Zealand's first ever magazine devoted solely to the sport of boxing, June 1959 being the first, a publication of his until last issue of May 1962 at which point of time he sold the rights to another publisher.

Hanks became an official correspondent for Australia's The Small Glove News, England's Boxing News, USA's The Ring, Boxing Illustrated and Boxing World as well as for New Zealand and other overseas daily tabloids. He became a member of The International Boxing Writers Association in June 1982 and in September 1982 was made a member of the New Zealand Sporting Journalists Association.

In 1985 Hanks officially became a member of the New Zealand Professional Boxing Association, initially in the capacity of a ringside judge and was to referee his first bout on 8 December 1986. He became the NZPBA's leading referee. Johnny also reported the 1990 Commonwealth Games (then held in Auckland city, NZ) for The Ring and UK's Boxing Monthly and Boxing News publications.

He regretfully resigned as the NZPBA's leading referee in the month of August 1992 after learning he had been diagnosed with leukemia. Eight years' later he suffered a severe life-threatening stroke.

In 2002 he joined the Lets Talk Boxing group on the internet and received an award from it for being "The Century Member" and compiled monthly world boxing ratings for the American site.

Hanks was named by The Bible of Boxing, USA's The Ring magazine, in their May 1954 issue as Prospect of the Month in the featherweight division. Johnny said, "As a competitor this was the biggest highlight of my career."

Hanks continues his involvement in boxing and gets to be a guest at various tournaments. He continues to write the occasional article(s) for New Zealand and overseas' publications. Johnny Hanks roles within the sport as boxer, second, trainer, judge, referee, reporter and promoter have him recognised within boxing circles as knowledgeable of the fight game and a 'gentleman' of the sport.

== Career ==
=== Amateur career ===
37 Fights, 30 Wins, 2 Draws, 5 Losses

- 1949 Runner-up Auckland junior paperweight championships
- 1950 King Country junior flyweight champion
- 1950 King Country senior paperweight champion
- 1950 Bay of Plenty senior paperweight champion
- 1950 Auckland senior paperweight champion
- 1951 Auckland senior flyweight champion
- 1952 Auckland senior bantamweight champion
- 1952 New Zealand bantamweight champion

Awards

- The Most Scientific Boxer Trophy 1950, 1951 and 1952.

=== Professional career ===
Fighting out of Auckland New Zealand, Hanks became a professional boxer in 1953, and was an immediate success winning his first five fights. On 13 April 1953 in Auckland New Zealand he defeated Morrie O'Sullivan in a hard-fought fight on points, and on 25 May 1953 defeated Bob Broadhurst on points, whom he would meet again.

He defeated Ray Ritchie on 20 July 1953, and again on 10 December 1953 this time stopping him in the third round. His second match up with Bob Broadhurst was on 3 August 1953 which he won.

On 14 June 1954 at Town Hall, Auckland, New Zealand he fought Lyn Philp for the vacant featherweight title, which he won by a KO in round eight, taking the featherweight title and belt.

It was on 16 May 1955 at the Town Hall, Dunedin, New Zealand, where he defeated Frank Wilson by TKO to become the New Zealand lightweight champion. Hanks was now holder of both the featherweight and lightweight titles.

After wins against Ray Mitchell and Joe McNally, he defended his lightweight title at the Town Hall, Dunedin, New Zealand, on 2 July 1956 against Joe McNally. Where he lost by TKO. He then defended his featherweight title at the Town Hall, Wellington, New Zealand, on 15 April 1957, where he lost to Billy Leckie. The first of four encounters between the two with Hanks winning the third in 1958. His last fight was in 1959 against Ian Mitchell, he then retired.

Coming out of retirement after six years Hanks made an unsuccessful comeback on 8 March 1965, at Carlaw Park, Auckland, New Zealand, against the formidable Manny Santos (arguably the best lightweight to ever come out of New Zealand). Being defeated by Santos in the second round by a TKO.
