= Dick Dunn (boxer) =

New Zealand boxer

Dunn in 1998

Richard John Dunn QSM (19 May 1908 – 7 August 2001) was a New Zealand boxing coach.

== Biography ==
Dunn was born in the coal-mining town of Millerton on the South Island's West Coast. His father was a stone-tunneller who bored into the sides of hills looking for seams of coal.

He was trained by an Australian boxer and when Dunn was 18 he moved into training for himself. In 1929 he moved his gymnasium from Wellington to the Hutt Valley and eventually set up in Moera’s Railway Workshops, starting off training 100 boys. The gymnasium was open five nights a week and a local policeman used to bring trouble-making boys there in the hope it would give them an interest and to keep them off the streets. Dick had a simple policy on accepting people.

Dunn still found time to compete in the ring and won the Hutt Valley and Wellington lightweight title in 1933, but retired shortly after. In the ring there was none tougher or of more determined mind, but outside the ring Dick made it his life ambition to befriend all who had the time to chat.

Champions he coached included Frank Creagh, who won heavyweight gold at the 1950 Auckland Empire Games, Wallace Coe, who took out the welterweight gold in Perth in 1962, Bill Kini, who won the heavyweight gold in Jamaica in 1966, Lyn Philp bantamweight champion (1948–54), and Billy Graham, who won four national titles.

Dunn was the manager of the New Zealand boxing team at the 1966 British Empire and Commonwealth Games in Kingston. He was a selector for the 1974 Commonwealth Games in Christchurch and coached for the Olympic Solidarity Fund.

Dunn’s sporting interests extended to soccer, racing, rugby, rugby league and cricket. He founded a cricket club at the age of 21 and played 52 consecutive seasons of Wellington senior cricket. He also coached men’s and women’s cricket in the Hutt Valley for decades, rising to coach the New Zealand women’s team.

Dunn retired to Bulls in 1974 and founded the Bulls RSA Amateur Boxing Club. In the 1987 Queen's Birthday Honours, he was awarded the Queen's Service Medal for community service.

He and his wife Myra (Chum), whom he married in Petone in 1940, moved to Wairarapa in 1985.

Dunn died in Masterton, aged 93.

== Memberships ==
Dunn was a life member of:

- The New Zealand Boxing Association
- New Zealand Boxing Coaches Association
- Riverside Petone Cricket Club
- Stop Out Soccer Club
- Wellington and Hutt Valley Boxing Trainers Association
