= Tomb of the Unknown Warrior (New Zealand) =

War memorial in Wellington

Coordinates: 41°17′55.78″S 174°46′37.99″E

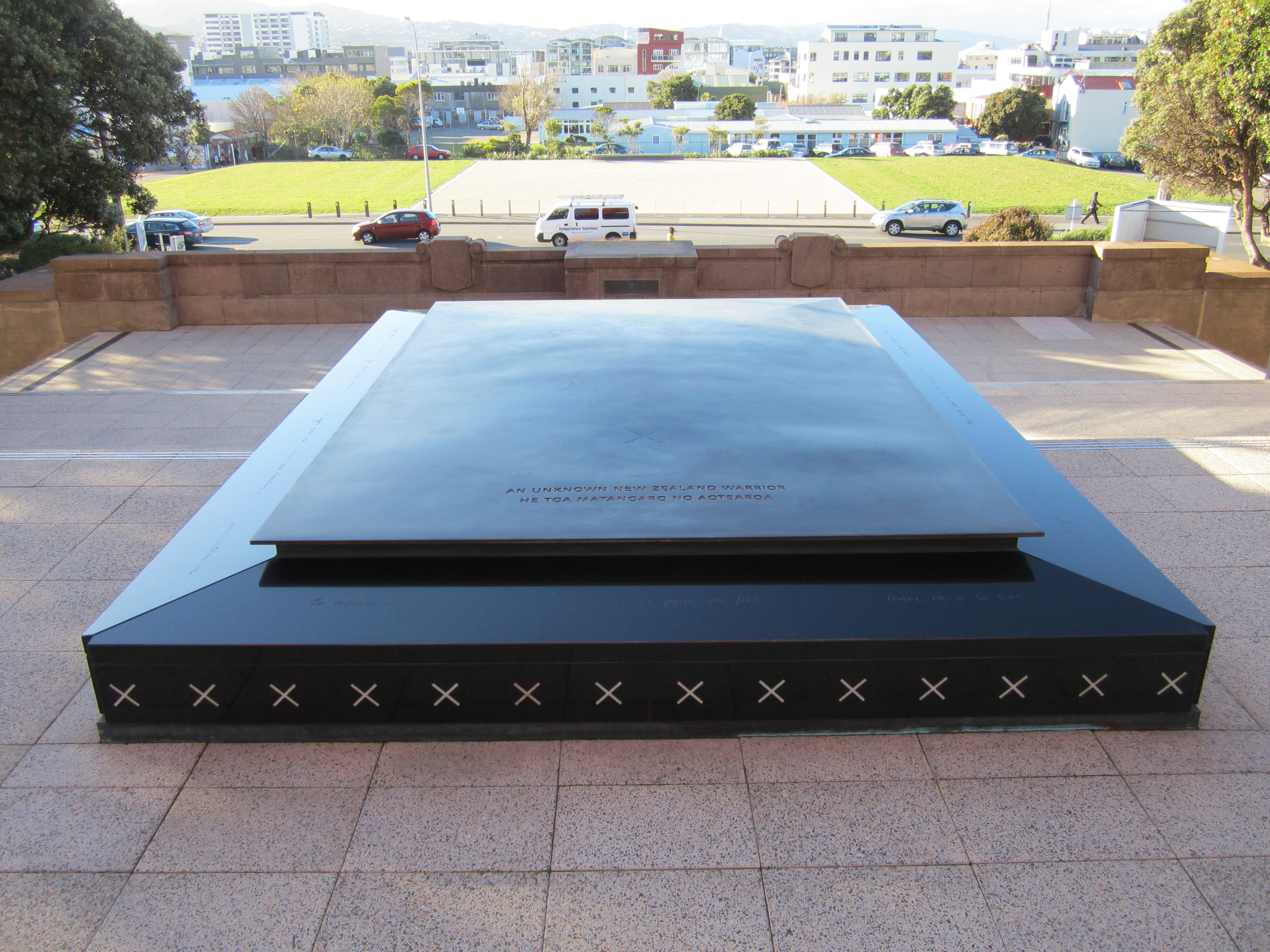
The Tomb of the Unknown Warrior in June 2012

The Tomb of the Unknown Warrior (Māori: Te Toma o te Toa Matangaro) is part of the New Zealand National War Memorial on Buckle Street, Wellington.

On 6 November 2004, the remains of an unknown New Zealand soldier were exhumed from the (CWGC) Caterpillar Valley Cemetery, and laid to rest in the Tomb of the Unknown Warrior in Wellington, New Zealand. He represents over 18,000 members of New Zealand forces who lost their lives during the First World War. A special headstone marks his original resting place in Plot 14, Row A, Grave 27 at the Caterpillar Valley Cemetery.

== History ==
The idea of creating a New Zealand tomb for an unknown soldier was first raised during 1921, and resurfaced periodically during the next century. In 1999 the idea was raised as a high-profile Millennium project, gaining support from then-Prime Minister Helen Clark. The project was approved in 2002.

During the planning stages there was debate about the title of the proposed monument: the Returned Services Association felt that the term "warrior" was too aggressive "and more commonly associated with a Maori warrior or rugby league player" and did not accurately represent the men who served behind the frontline. The New Zealand Defence Force believed that "warrior" better represented all three branches of the military (army, navy and air force) than the term "soldier" and also represented Māori traditions.

Another problem faced during planning was that Wellington City Council granted approval to place the tomb on the forecourt of the National War Memorial on the basis that it was not part of the memorial's heritage listing. A High Court judgement stated that the council had made a "serious error of law" and that the steps and forecourt, where people came to pay their respects, were perhaps the most important part of the memorial. The proposed tomb location was then put out for a publicly notified resource consent.

The project to bring the soldier back was dubbed 'Operation Valhalla' and cost approximately $1 million, which included construction of the tomb, flights and accommodation and other expenses. A party of 90 people in a Royal New Zealand Airforce Boeing 757 accompanied the remains from France to New Zealand.

Māori ritual was involved during the creation of the Tomb of the Unknown Warrior. A Te Āti Awa elder (kaumātua) blessed the site at the start and end of construction, and the Unknown Warrior was accompanied from France to New Zealand by the New Zealand Defence Force Maori Cultural Group, recognising Māori protocol that the dead should never be left alone.

On 6 November 2004 the remains, sealed in a copper-lined totara coffin which was placed in a kauri casket, were handed over from the care of the Commonwealth War Graves Commission to a New Zealand delegation during a ceremony at Longueval, Somme, France. New Zealand Defence Force chief, Air Marshal Bruce Ferguson, who had the task of repatriating the Warrior's remains, said of the occasion "I told him [the Warrior] we're taking him home and that those who are taking him home are soldiers, sailors and airmen, past and present. I asked the Warrior to be the guardian of all military personnel who had died on active service. I then promised that we, the people of New Zealand, will be his guardian for ever".

The warrior arrived in New Zealand on 10 November 2004. While he lay in state at Parliament Buildings an estimated 10,000 people paid their respects. The warrior was laid to rest on the 86th Armistice Day, 11 November 2004, after a service at St Paul's Anglican Cathedral and a 2.85 km slow march procession through the streets of Wellington, lined by about 100,000 people. At 3:59 pm, the tomb was sealed with a bronze mantel bearing the words:

AN UNKNOWN NEW ZEALAND WARRIOR
HE TOA MATANGARO NO AOTEAROA

The warrior is one of more than 1500 New Zealanders killed at the Somme. Most of them, 1272, remained unidentified and are buried in unmarked graves or remembered on memorial walls. The remains of the unknown warrior are thought to include an almost complete skeleton, and other belongings that established his nationality beyond doubt.

== Awards ==
The Warrior was awarded:

- 1914–15 Star for service between August 1914 and December 1915
- British War Medal for service during World War I up to 1920
- Victory Medal
- 1939–1945 Star for service during World War II
- New Zealand Operational Service Medal

The Royal New Zealand Returned and Services' Association also awarded its Badge in Gold, the first time it has been awarded posthumously. Immediate Past National President David Cox, a World War II veteran, made the presentation, stating "The Badge in Gold is a fitting tribute because the Unknown Warrior paid the ultimate price for his service and now he is finally returned. You are now one of us – welcome home".

Each RNZRSA District President placed soil and other items into the tomb to acknowledge the service personnel from their districts who had given their lives to the nation, including soil from the farm of Charles Upham. Soil from Caterpillar Valley Cemetery was provided by the Ambassador from France, Jean-Michel Marlaud.

== Design ==
Three caskets were made and carved by Robert Ian (Bob) Jones, a military veteran and cabinet maker who worked at a Greymouth funeral home. Jones had served in Vietnam, and included reference to Vietnam and the 37 New Zealand soldiers killed there in the designs he carved on the caskets. The inner totara casket was donated by a Greymouth resident, and the Funeral Directors' Association paid for two kauri caskets. One of the kauri caskets was given to the Army Museum at Waiouru.

The tomb was designed by Kingsley Baird "as an expression of the nation’s memory and a cross-cultural language of remembrance [that] combines Maori and Pakeha ritual, symbolic, and visual elements . . . to express remembrance specific to New Zealand’s contemporary identity". The tomb of black granite is built into the forecourt steps of the National War Memorial. It has a low profile so that it doesn't detract from the rest of the memorial. The tomb features New Zealand symbolism and iconography. A ceremonial call (karanga) is engraved around the base of the tomb in English and Māori, calling the unknown soldier back home to New Zealand. Crosses made of Tākaka marble are set into the granite of the tomb to represent the soldier's comrades who died and remain overseas. The lid is made of bronze with four inlaid greenstone crosses referencing the Southern Cross constellation found on the New Zealand flag.

=== Karanga ===
Te mamae nei a te pōuri nui

Tēnei ra e te tau.

Aue hoki mai ra ki te kainga tūturu.

E tatari atu nei ki a kou tou

Ngā tau roa

I ngaro atu ai te aroha.

E ngau kino nei I ahau aue taukuri e.

The great pain we feel

Is for you who were our future.

Come back, return home.

We have waited for you

Through the long years

You were away. Sorrow

Aches within me.
