= National War Memorial (New Zealand) =

War memorial in Wellington

- Te Maharatanga Pakanga o te Motu
- New Zealand
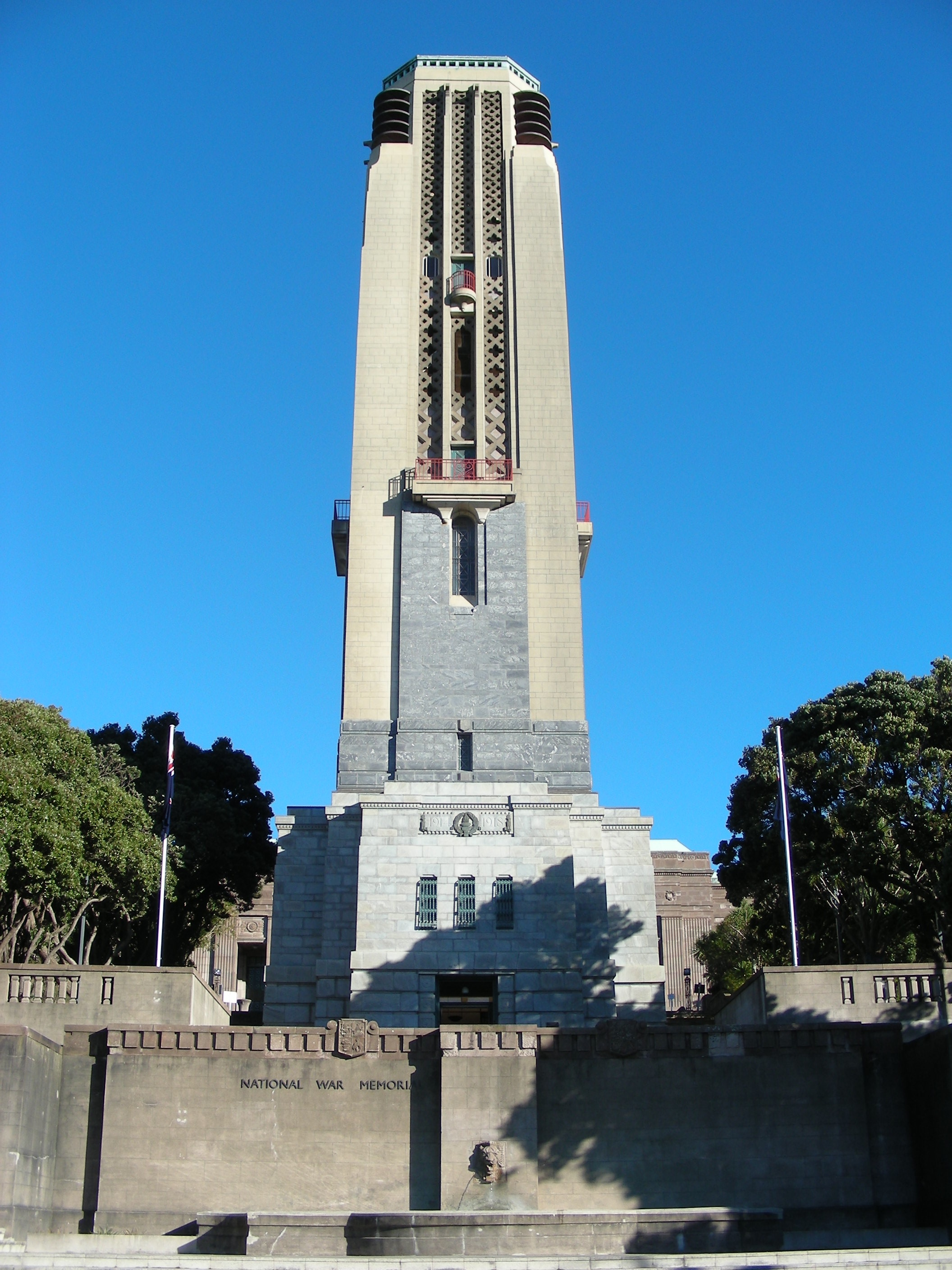
- The memorial's distinctive carillon
- For New Zealand dead of South African War, World Wars I and II and the wars in Korea, Malaysia and Vietnam
- Unveiled: Anzac Day (25 April) 1932
- Location: 41°17′56″S 174°46′38″E; Wellington, New Zealand
- Designed by: Gummer and Ford

Heritage New Zealand – Category 1
- Designated: 28 June 1990
- Reference no.: 1410

The National War Memorial of New Zealand (Māori: Te Maharatanga Pakanga o te Motu) is located next to the Dominion Museum building on Buckle Street, in Wellington, the nation's capital. The war memorial was dedicated in 1932 on Anzac Day (25 April) in commemoration of the First World War. It also officially remembers the New Zealanders who died in the Second Boer War, World War II and the wars in Korea, Malaysia and Vietnam.

The war memorial consists of the War Memorial Carillon and the Hall of Memories. The tomb of an unknown New Zealand warrior was constructed in 2004, in front of the Hall of Memories. In the Hall of Memories, Rolls of Honour bear the names and ranks of 30,108 of New Zealand's war dead. Lyndon Smith's bronze statue of a family group in the Hall of Memories is the focal point for the complex.

The carillon and the Hall of Memories were closed for earthquake strengthening and refurbishment in 2012. The Hall of Memories reopened in 2015 and the carillon in 2018, but both were closed again in February 2020 for further work and re-opened for the 2026 Anzac Day commemoration. Following the re-opening in 2018 after refurbishment, Wellington City Council reported that there were 60,000 visitors to the memorial per year.

The National War Memorial was registered by Heritage New Zealand as a Category 1 Historic Place in 1990. In August 2025 the Ministry for Culture and Heritage announced that it had placed the National War Memorial (including the carillon, Hall of Memories and Tomb of the Unknown Warrior) on to its National Historic Landmark list, launched in 2019. The National War Memorial is the second place to be listed as a National Historic Landmark.

== History ==
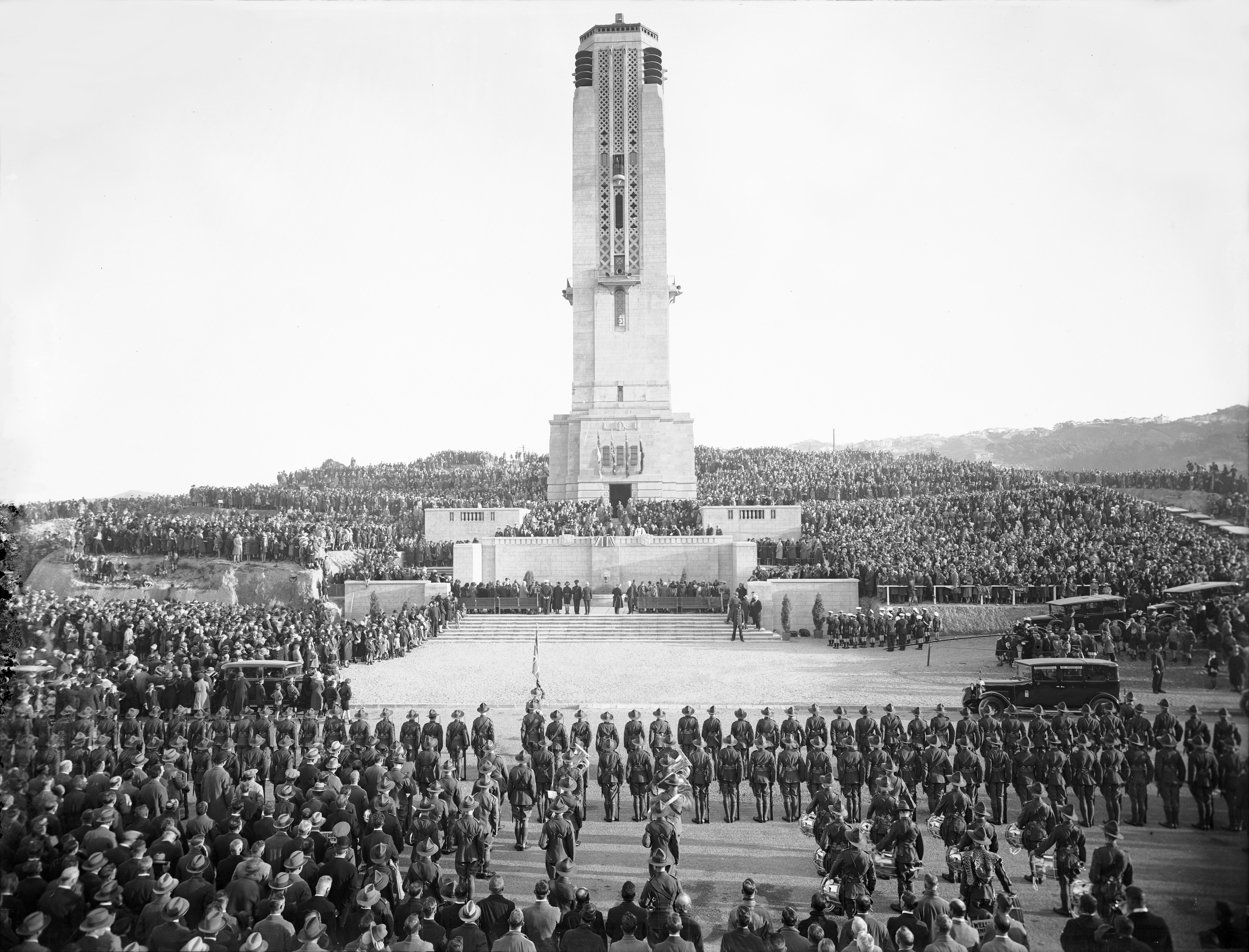
The dedication of the National War Memorial Carillon, on Anzac Day, 25 April 1932

In 1919 the Government created a National War Memorial Committee and allocated £100,000 for a National War Memorial in Wellington. Prime Minister William Massey said that any memorial "should be visible from any part of the city, and from ships entering the harbour".After much debate about what form a memorial should take – a road, a cathedral, an arch – it was eventually agreed to build a complex that included a national art gallery, museum, and war memorial in the central suburb of Mt Cook. Local people formed the Wellington War Memorial Carillon Society in 1926 to raise money for bells for a carillon, even though the government had not decided on a design for the war memorial. Another group, the Wellington Citizens War Memorial Committee, wanted a different type of memorial and had begun raising funds in 1922, leading to the eventual construction of the Wellington Cenotaph near Parliament. In 1928 the government agreed to the idea of a carillon. By this time the bells had already been cast in London, at the expense of the Carillon Society. A competition was held in 1929 for plans for the war memorial, and for the Dominion Museum and the National Art Gallery immediately behind it. The competition was won by Messrs Gummer and Ford.

Work on the carillon was completed in time for an Anzac Day 1932 dedication viewed by a crowd of 10,000 people. Various dignitaries gave speeches, Governor-General Lord Bledisloe switched on the Lamp of Remembrance on top of the tower, and then the carillon played the national anthem and several hymns, accompanied by the singing of the crowd. The Evening Post described the sound of the carillon as 'magic from the skies'.

The Dominion Museum opened behind the carillon in 1936, but construction of the Hall of Memories in the base of the carillon tower was delayed by the Depression, then the Second World War. The first plans were prepared in 1937, and Gummer and Ford forwarded a new set in 1949, but the project did not go to tender until 1960. When tenders closed, the Christchurch firm of P Graham and Son (the same firm that built the carillon tower) was chosen, its tender being £114,000. The Hall of Memories was officially opened by the Governor-General, Sir Bernard Fergusson, on 5 April 1964.

In 2004 the tomb of the unknown New Zealand warrior was added. Retired Army Colonel Andrew Renton-Green, who chairs the National War Memorial Advisory Council and the coordinating committee behind the tomb project, explained why it took so long:

The history goes back to the time (William) Gummer designed the National War Memorial, which was completed – not in its present form – in 1932. The original design was just the carillon tower and an avenue which led from the harbour to the tower, with what was then the National Museum behind. As part of that design Gummer actually made provision for a tomb, but all building other than the carillon tower was abandoned because of the economic situation at the time – the Depression.

So Gummer’s vision was still there; it was never fulfilled. In 1963 the Hall of Memories was added, and it was at this time that the RSA, and others, said wouldn’t it be a good idea if we had our own Unknown Warrior. There are not many people in New Zealand who can afford to pay their respects to one of their family by going to Westminster Abbey, where the Commonwealth tomb was put in the ground in 1923.

It’s just another step along the way, from Gummer’s original design of just the carillon, to the Hall of Memories being added in ’63, to this [the tomb] being added now – it shows that it’s actually a living thing, it’s not dead. It’s not about dead people at all, it’s about living people.

=== Earthquake strengthening and closures ===
In 2011, structural engineers Dunning Thornton completed a partial seismic assessment of the carillon tower. A full assessment was not completed because the Ministry for Culture and Heritage wanted the tower to be refurbished in time for the 100-year commemoration of Anzac Day in 2015. Dunning Thornton advised the ministry that the 70 tonnes of bells in the carillon tower could fall down or destabilise the building in an earthquake, and advised the ministry to get the steel bell frames checked. The ministry did not do this, and instead went ahead with a planned earthquake strengthening and refurbishment project.

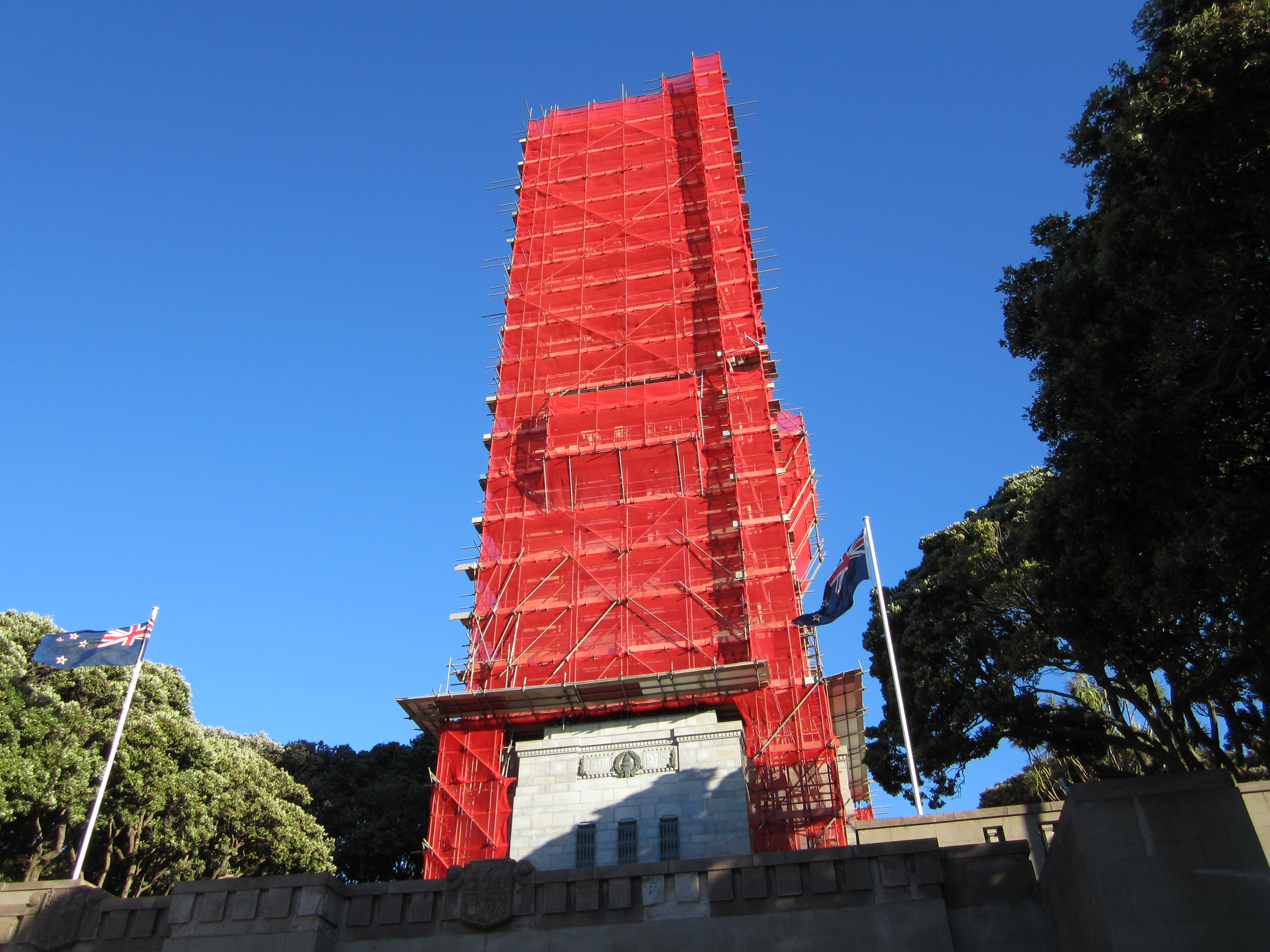
The National War Memorial undergoing repairs in June 2012

Fletcher Construction completed earthquake strengthening and refurbishment of the Hall of Memories and carillon in 2012–2015, at a cost of $2.7 million. Work on the carillon began in March 2012 and was expected to take only three months, but more problems were found as work advanced, with the result that the project wasn't completed until the end of 2013. Work on the carillon included installation of new seismic bracing and walls in the clavier room, new floors, ladders and safety nets, repairing and repainting various areas, re-plastering the outside of the 51 m-high (167 ft) tower, and moving storm water and electrical infrastructure.

Strengthening and refurbishment of the Hall of Memories involved fixing buttresses to beams under the steps, to support the building, and fixing the stonework inside the building to the wall of the carillon with 300 steel rods. This had to be done as unobtrusively as possible, so the holes drilled for the rods were filled in with ground-up stone to make them hardly noticeable. The strengthened Hall of Memories attained 100% of the New Building Standard earthquake code and the building reopened in 2015.

Studio of Pacific Architecture Ltd won the 'Heritage' category of the New Zealand Institute of Architects national New Zealand Architecture Awards in 2016 for their work on refurbishing the Hall of Memories and carillon.

Work on the carillon building had caused concrete dust which damaged the instrument. Some of the large bells were able to be played at Anzac Day commemorations in 2015, and then between 2016 and 2018, 15,000 pieces of the instrument – the bells and organ – were taken apart and reassembled by carillonist Timothy Hurd. The carillon finally reopened on 30 May 2018, after a six-year closure.

Dunning Thornton had reminded the ministry again in 2015 and 2017 that detailed assessment of the bell frames was necessary, but the ministry only requested a full assessment of the frames in August 2019. Also in August 2019, Wellington City Council advised the Ministry for Culture and Heritage that an earthquake-prone building notice had to be put on the building, but the ministry did not make the information public and did not close the building until six months later. Although Dunning Thornton's full assessment was not completed until April 2020, the Ministry for Culture and Heritage closed the carillon on 20 February 2020. The ministry stated at the time that an engineering report had found that the structure was an earthquake risk, meeting only 15% of the New Building Standard earthquake code, without admitting that they had been aware of potential problems since 2011. The weakest part of the building was the frames around the heavy bells. The Hall of Memories closed at the same time because although it was no longer earthquake-prone, it could only be accessed via the carillon tower.

A peer review of Dunning Thornton's 2020 report was carried out by Holmes Consulting, who made further recommendations about the likely performance of the building during an earthquake. In December 2021 the Ministry for Culture and Heritage announced that it hoped to have strengthening completed by May 2027, in a project with six steps at an estimated cost of $7.2 million. The carillon and Hall of Memories were to remain closed until the work was completed. However, the Ministry for Culture and Heritage decided it would open the Hall of Memories for specific occasions. On 15 February 2023, Princess Anne and entourage entered the Hall of Memories and the Princess laid a wreath there. The media noted that this event took place only a few hours before a large earthquake shook Wellington and queried the decision to hold the ceremony inside the building. The carillon and Hall of Memories re-opened in time for the Anzac Day commemoration in April 2026.

== Memorial tower and carillon ==
The inscription on the foundation stone of the carillon tower reads:

Reo Wairua. To the glory of God. To the memory of the New Zealanders that died in the Great War, 1914 to 1918, and in honour of those that served or suffered, this stone was laid by the Right Honourable G W Forbes, PC, MP, Prime Minister of New Zealand, on 15th May, 1931.

The complex made considerable use of New Zealand stone. The carillon was clad with pinkish-brown Putaruru stone. Unfortunately the material was variable and by 1960 had weathered badly in places. It was removed from the carillon and replaced by Takaka marble in 1982. The upper part of the campanile was replastered with sand that matched the original stone, and the metal louvres, window frames, and grilles were replaced. After restoration and installation of 16 extra bells, the carillon was rededicated in the presence of Queen Elizabeth II in 1986.

=== Hall of Memories ===
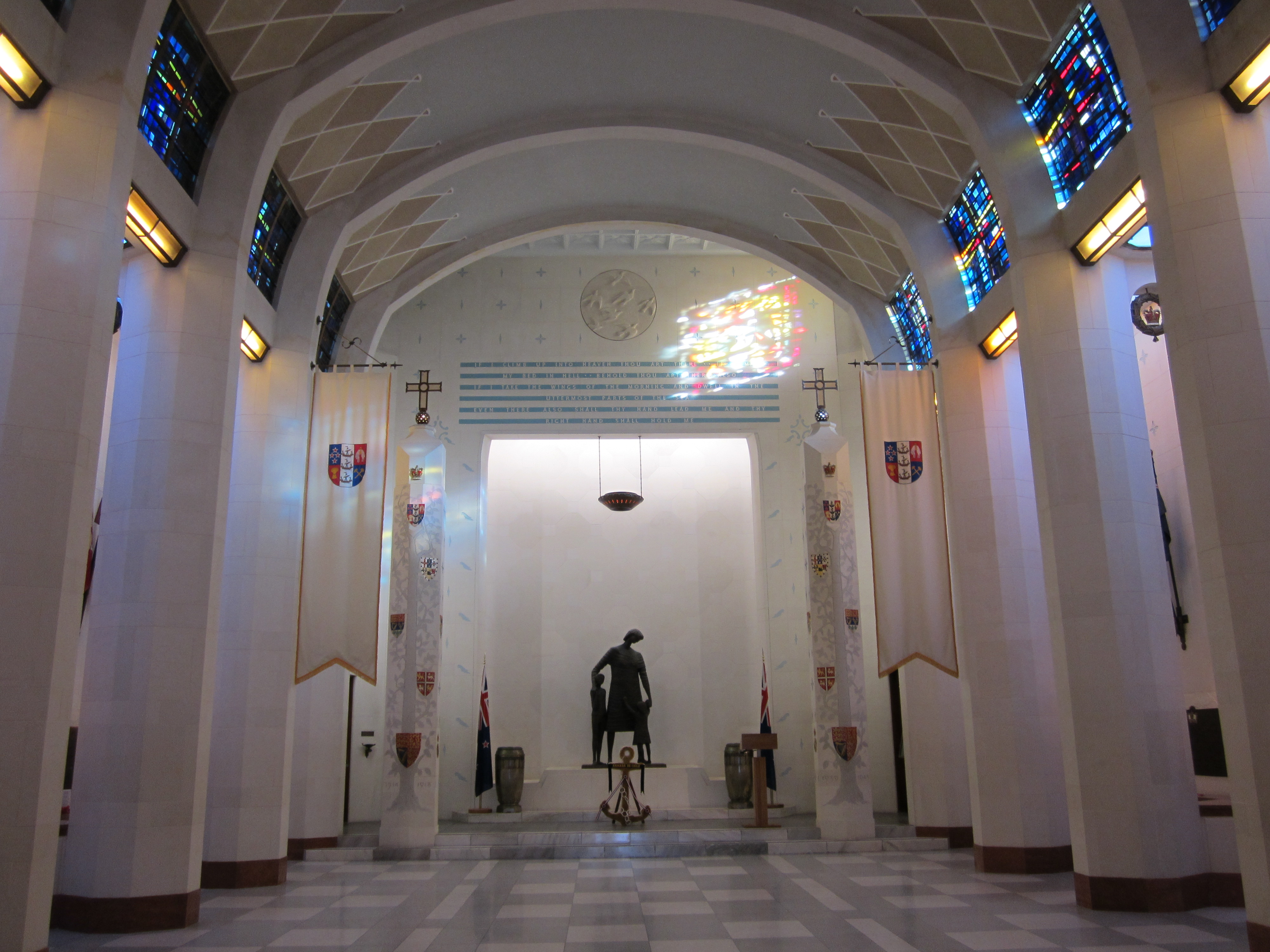
The Hall of Memories, with the Mother and Children visible in the background

The Hall of Memories is approached through an octagonal vestibule forming the base of the Carillon Tower. The Hall of Memories is lined with cream Mt Somers limestone. Inside, Hanmer marble, Coromandel granite and Takaka marble are all used. There are six memorial alcoves on each side of the Hall leading up to an apse and Sanctuary at the southern end. These alcoves are designed as small side chapels dedicated to the different branches of the New Zealand Armed Forces that have served in overseas conflicts.

The entrance to the Sanctuary is flanked on either side by two white stone columns, each surmounted with a bronze orb and cross and engraved with the coats of arms of members of the Commonwealth whose forces served in World Wars I and II. These coats of arms are linked by stylised branches, representing the tree of the Commonwealth. A bronze statue Mother and Children (1962) by Lyndon Smith is the focal point in the Sanctuary. The statue represents the families left behind and those who suffered the loss of those who died in conflicts. It is a rare example of the depiction of women's experiences in a war memorial.

On each of the two side walls of the Sanctuary a large cross forms the background for the coats of arms of the main towns of the nine provinces of New Zealand. These crosses symbolise the sacrifices made by New Zealanders in times of war. Mounted to one side of the Sanctuary is a Lamp of Brotherhood, one of 84 made after World War II to commemorate the war dead of all nations and to promote reconciliation and unity between nations. Four Rolls of Honour, inscribed with the name and rank of 30,108 of New Zealand's war dead, are displayed in bronze display cases on the east and west walls of the Sanctuary.

=== Carillon ===
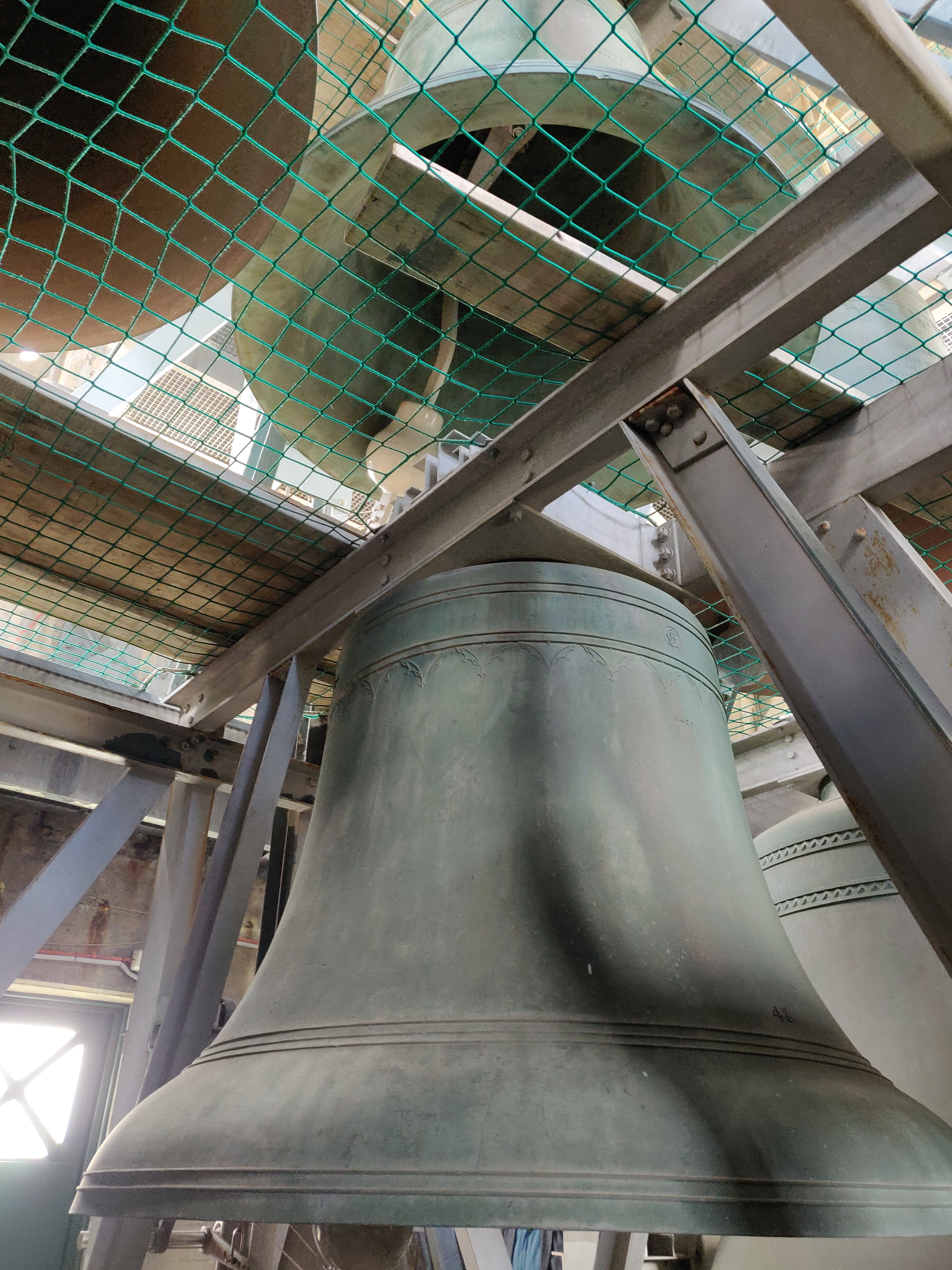
Bells in the carillon

The National War Memorial Carillon was designed as a sister instrument to the 53-bell carillon at the Peace Tower in Ottawa, Canada.

The carillon bells were made in Croydon, England, by Gillett & Johnston, and arrived in New Zealand in January 1931. Each of the original 49 bells bears a name or inscription, in memory of those who served. The three largest bells are dedicated to Anzac, Somme, and Palestine, the three main theatres in which New Zealand forces served. Other bells include: The Nurses bell, The Gallipoli 1915 bell, the Flanders field bell (dedicated in memory of Katherine Mansfield's brother, Leslie Beauchamp) and the Medical forces bell. The one bell not dedicated to a person or event from World War I is the Wellington's South African War Veterans' bell, which was inscribed two years after the original inscriptions took place.

At the time of dedication the 49 bells ranged from one weighing slightly more than 4 kg with a diameter of 170 mm and 140 mm high, up to one weighing 5 tonnes and measuring 2 m by 1.6 m. Their total weight was more than 30 tonnes and they cost £11,000.

Since 1984 the carillon has been substantially rebuilt and enlarged. Twenty mid-range bells have been replaced with 21 smaller treble bells and 4 large bass bells, extending the total range to 6 octaves. The four bass bells were added in 1995 and are named "Grace/Aroha", "Hope/Tūmanako", Remembrance/Whakamaharatanga", and "Peace/Rangimārie". The carillon currently has 74 bells, with the "Peace/Rangimārie" bell weighing 12.5 tonnes, making it the largest in the Southern Hemisphere. The carillon ranks as the third-largest in the world by total weight.

Anzac Day and specific battle commemorations have special places in the annual schedule of events. The carillon has been played in over 200 hours of live concerts per year and a comprehensive domestic and international carillon teaching programme was previously conducted under the direction of the National Carillonist, Timothy Hurd. Since the opening of the National War Memorial Carillon in 1932 there have only been four official carillonists: Gladys Watkins, John Randal, Selwyn Baker, and Timothy Hurd.

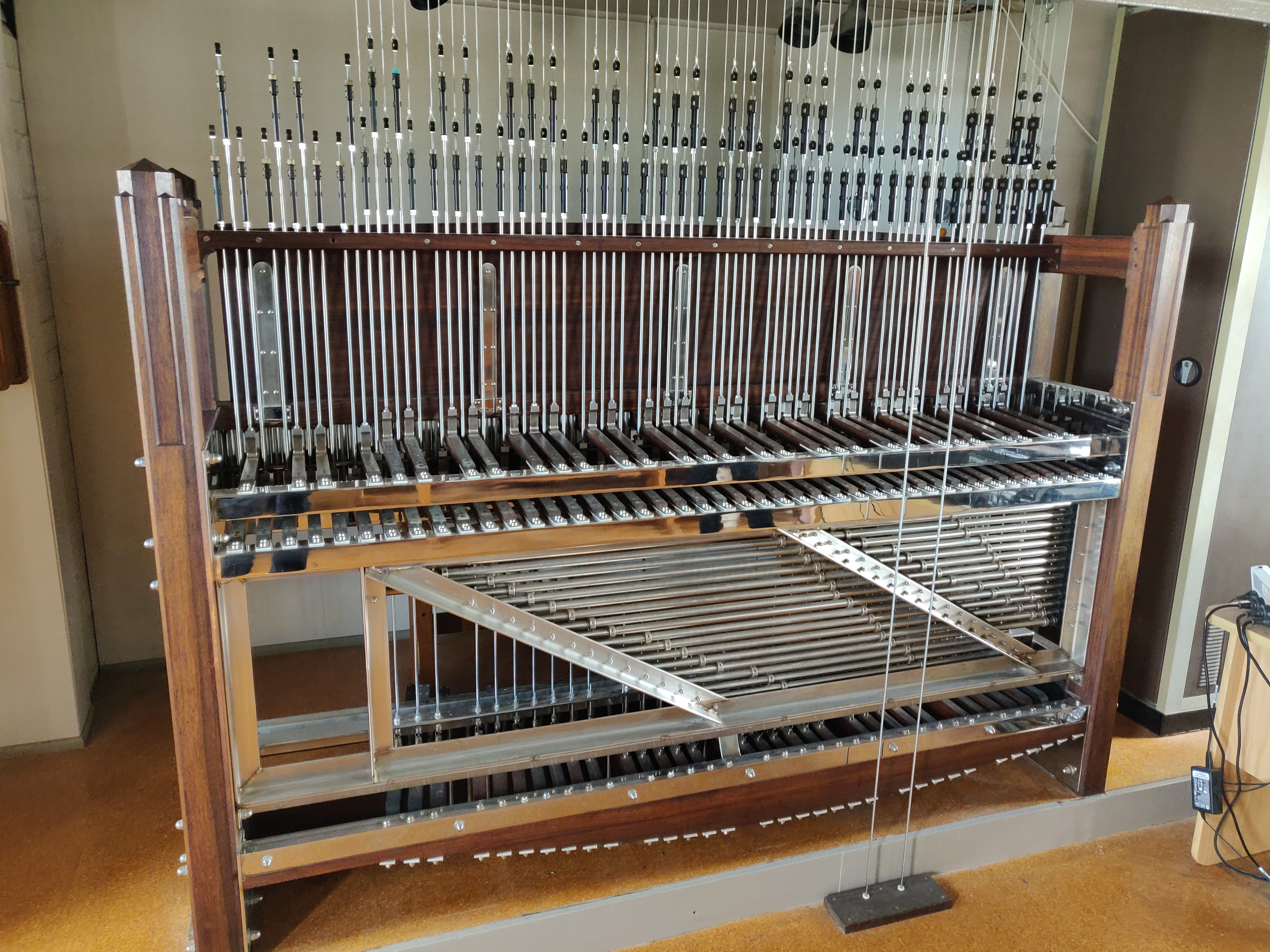
Keyboard for the carillon

The carillonist sits at a clavier or keyboard and uses his or her hands and feet to strike wooden keys and pedals which are each connected by a wire to a clapper inside a bell. When a key or pedal pulls on the wire, the clapper strikes the bell to create a sound. The bell itself doesn't move. Timothy Hurd stated that "the carillon is a highly gestural instrument. The dexterity required is more one of limbs than of finger skills. It is like dancing to your own music". For seven years after Gladys Watkins retired in 1936, there was no carillonist: instead, an electric machine played the bells automatically, using a perforated paper roll like those used in a pianola. This machinery was removed in 1986 when the bells and wires were refurbished.

In August 2025, RNZ reported that the Ministry of Culture and Heritage was planning to disestablish the carillonist role, a position that Timothy Hurd had occupied for around 40 years. Restoration of the carillon was expected to be completed by Anzac Day 2026 and it would be fully usable by then, but the Ministry stated that it intended to ring the bells only at Anzac Day "and perhaps at other ceremonies", in contrast to the hundreds of hours of concerts per year before the restoration.

== Unknown Warrior ==
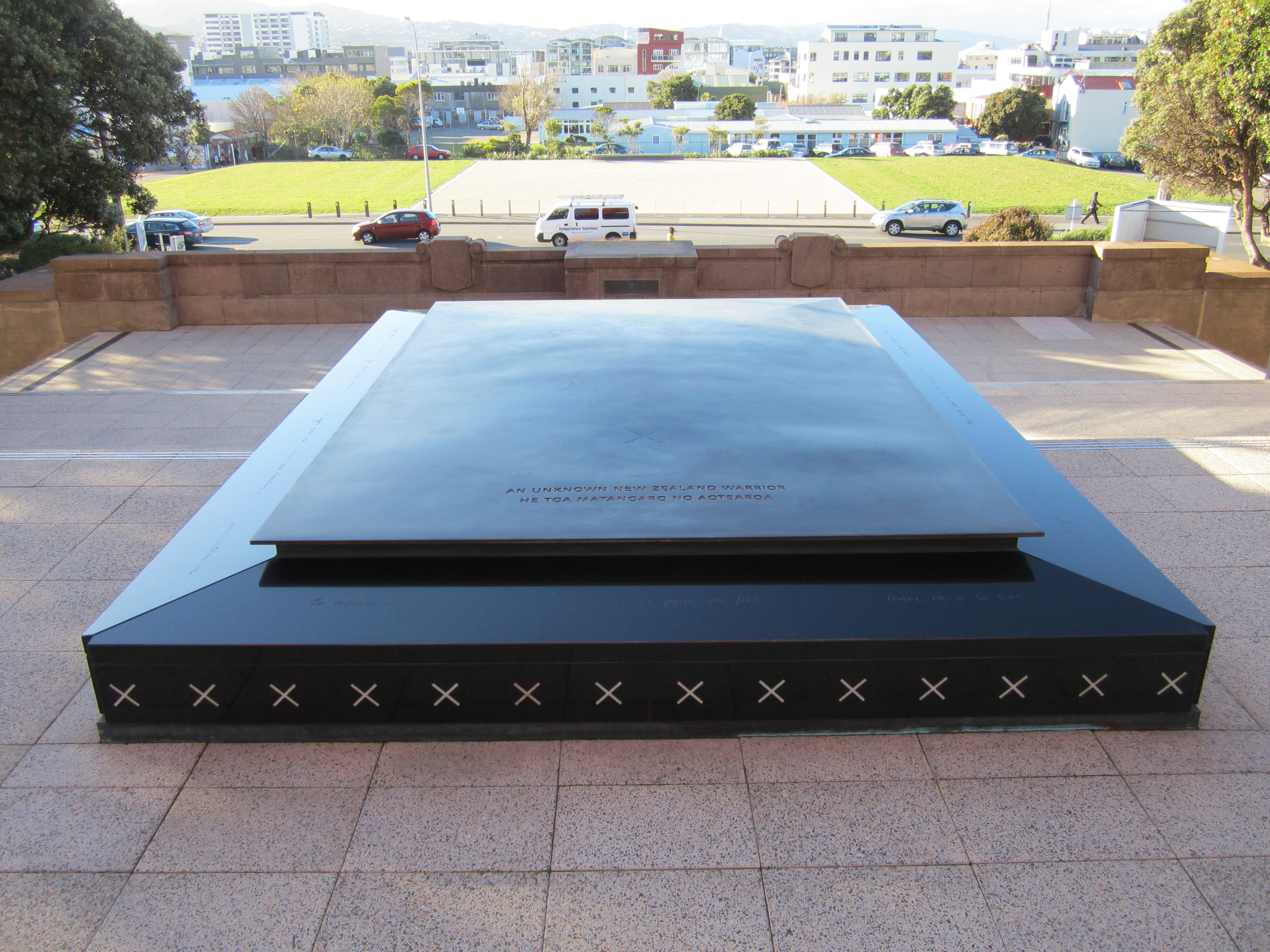
The New Zealand Tomb of the Unknown Warrior installed to the north of the National War Memorial

To serve as a focus of remembrance for the sacrifice made by all New Zealand servicemen and women, in 2004 a project was undertaken to repatriate the body of an unknown warrior for burial in the new Tomb of the Unknown Warrior.

The Unknown Warrior is one of over 250,000 New Zealanders who served in overseas wars. He is one of 30,000 who died in service, and one of over 9000 who have no known grave or whose remains could never be recovered. The remains were chosen by the Commonwealth War Graves Commission from the Caterpillar Valley Cemetery, near where the New Zealand Division fought in 1916.

As the soldier's name, rank, regiment, race, religion and other details are unknown, he represents and honours all New Zealanders who became lost to their families in war.

On Monday 1 November a New Zealand delegation departed for France to begin the process of repatriating the remains of the Unknown Warrior. A handover ceremony took place on 6 November at the New Zealand Memorial site near the village of Longueval, France. The ceremony marked the official return of the Unknown Warrior from the care of the Commonwealth War Graves Commission into the care of New Zealand.

I told him [the Warrior] we're taking him home and that those who are taking him home are soldiers, sailors and airmen, past and present. I asked the Warrior to be the guardian of all military personnel who had died on active service. I then promised that we, the people of New Zealand, will be his guardian.
Air Marshal Bruce Ferguson

On return to New Zealand on Wednesday 10 November, the Unknown Warrior lay in state at Parliament. Thousands of New Zealanders attended the vigil to pay their respects. A memorial service was held on 11 November at the Wellington Cathedral of St Paul, followed by a military funeral procession through central Wellington. More than 100,000 people lined the streets to the National War Memorial where an interment ceremony with full military honours took place. David Cox, RNZRSA National President, stated that "The Unknown Warrior symbolise[s] the tremendous sacrifice New Zealand has made over the last century in the struggle to preserve freedom and justice and the democratic way of life...For all New Zealanders this [is] a day of remembrance and a day to remember."

The Warrior was finally laid to rest in the Tomb of the Unknown Warrior on Thursday 11 November 2004, Armistice Day. The tomb is sealed with a bronze mantel bearing the words:

AN UNKNOWN NEW ZEALAND WARRIOR
HE TOA MATANGARO NO AOTEAROA

== The Man with the Donkey ==
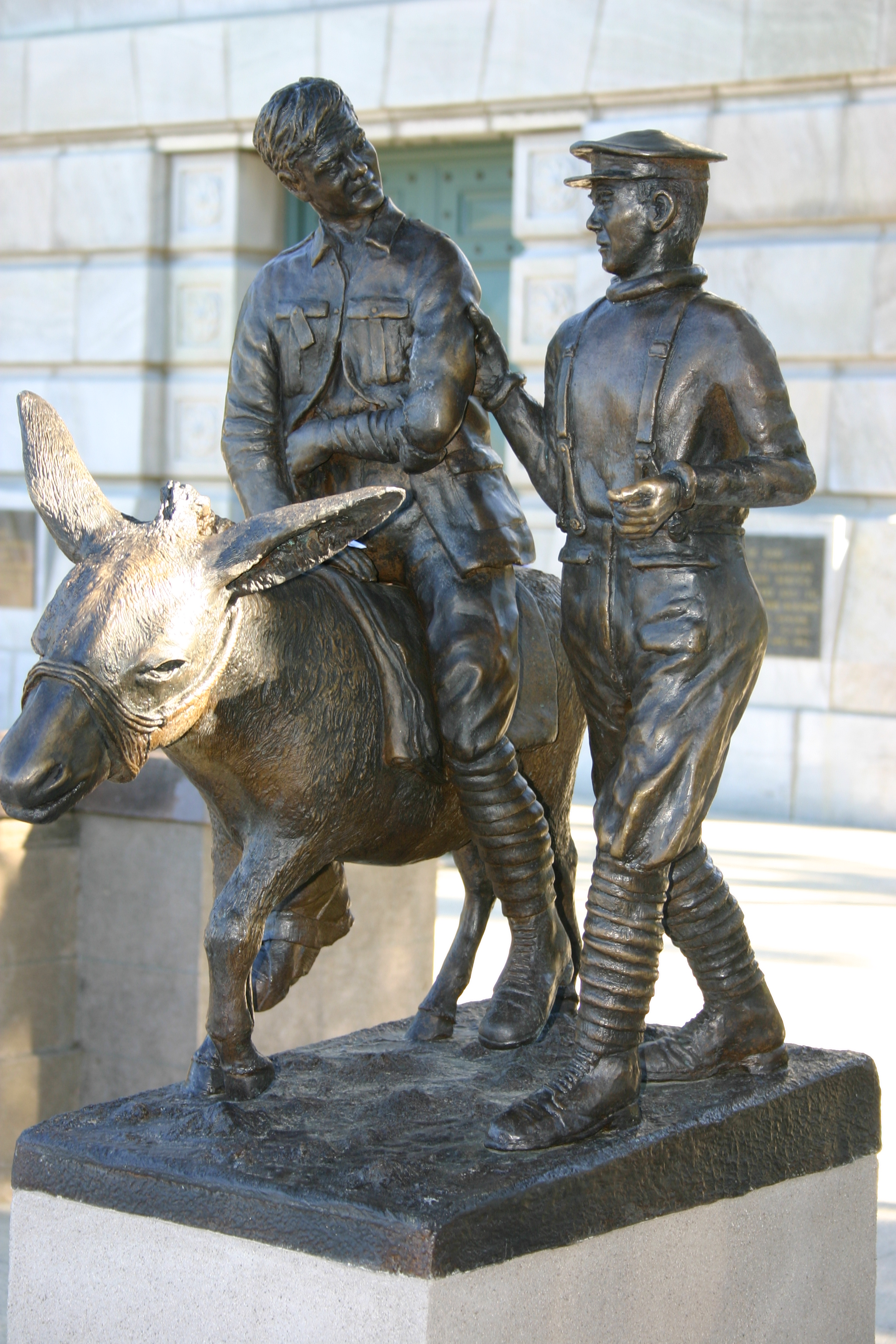
The Man with the Donkey sculpture placed outside the National War Memorial

A bronze sculpture by Paul Walshe of Richard Alexander Henderson as The Man with the Donkey stands outside the National War Memorial. It is based on the photograph of Henderson taken at Gallipoli by James Gardiner Jackson on 12 May 1915, and is a "tribute to all medical personnel, stretcher bearers and ambulance drivers who served alongside New Zealand troops in wartime". Commissioned by the Royal New Zealand Returned and Services' Association with sponsorship from Oceanic Life, it was unveiled by Henderson's son Ross on 20 April 1990. An inscription reads:

The stories of Simpson and Henderson are the stories of all stretcher bearers. Alone, unsustained by the hot-blooded heroism shown by men in violent action, with only the meager protection afforded by a Red Cross flag, these men calmly exposed their lives to danger to save their comrades and so built the tradition of unselfishness and cool courage that is a feature of their service.

== Pukeahu National War Memorial Park ==
Pukeahu Park was developed on land in front of the War Memorial to commemorate the 100th anniversary of World War I. It opened on 18 April 2015 in time for the centenary of the World War I Gallipoli landings. The park contains memorials from both New Zealand's traditional military allies and past opponents. It lies over a traffic tunnel opened in 2014.

== See also ==
- Bridge of Remembrance
- List of carillons in Australia and New Zealand
- List of Korean War memorials
- Lists of war monuments and memorials
- New Zealand War Memorial, London
