= Helen Young (radio manager) =

New Zealand radio manager (1926–2019)

Helen Young MBE
- Young in 1995
- Born: Helen Agnes Young; 22 March 1926; Hāwera, New Zealand
- Died: 2 August 2019 (aged 93); Auckland, New Zealand
- Occupation: Radio manager
- Known for: Manager of RNZ Concert

Helen Agnes Young MBE (22 March 1926 – 2 August 2019) was a New Zealand radio manager and an advocate for New Zealand music performers and composers.

Born in Hāwera on 22 March 1926, Young was the daughter of Agnes Isabel Young (née Bartholomew) and Andrew Morton Young. She was educated at St Cuthbert's College, Auckland, and later went to London, where she studied at the Royal College of Music and the Guildhall School of Music and Drama. After working at the music library of the British Arts Council and the British Institute of Recorded Sound, she returned to New Zealand. She was manager of RNZ Concert for 12 years between 1978 and 1989, and worked for Radio New Zealand for 35 years in all.

In the 1987 Queen's Birthday Honours, Young was appointed a Member of the Order of the British Empire, for services to broadcasting, and she received the award for "Outstanding Contribution to Broadcasting" at the 1990 New Zealand Radio Awards.

Young died in Auckland on 2 August 2019.
