= Lyn Philp =

New Zealand boxer

Personal information
- Nationality: New Zealand
- Born: Lynley V Philp; 27 January 1924 Lower Hutt, New Zealand
- Died: 17 July 1981 (aged 57)
- Weight: Bantamweight

Boxing career
- Stance: Orthodox

Boxing record
- Total fights: 10
- Wins: 6
- Win by KO: 2
- Losses: 4
- Draws: 0
- No contests: 0

Lyn Philp (1924-1981) was a New Zealand professional boxer, and New Zealand's Bantamweight Champion from 1947 - 1954.

- Ranked fourth best bantamweight New Zealand all-time greats.

With his punching power, speed and elusive style, Philp soon became the #1 contender for the bantamweight belt. In 1960 he was ranked third best bantamweight in New Zealand history.

== Biography ==
During World War II, Philp was drafted into the New Zealand Army, serving with distinction in the Middle East and Japan in World War II.

== Amateur career ==
In the spring of 1942, the United States First Marine Division sailed for Wellington, prior to opening a counteroffensive against the advancing Japanese forces. The marines were matched to fight local boxers on the preliminaries to the Strickland-Mullett heavyweight title fight. In the local team there appeared two Wellington fighters who were to turn professional after the war, Jack McCann and Lyn Philp. Both had wins over US Marines, and 15-year-old Bobby Goslin, drawn to meet P. Gonsalves, less than a minute later they were picking a semi-conscious Marine up off the deck! Goslin who would represent New Zealand at the 1948 Olympics. Philp, incidentally, fought Goslin three times, winning once and losing twice. Philp while serving with J Force in Japan after the war, he would win a tournament in Kure, beating an Australian in the final. Kure is at the southern end of Japan's main island Honshū. The allocated area of occupation included the Hiroshima Prefecture.

== Professional career ==
He started his pro-career as a bantamweight joining the training stable of the legendary Dick Dunn. His first professional fight was a win against Ronnie Hawes on 21 April 1947 at Wellington Town Hall.

At Hastings New Zealand on 6 August 1947, and his second professional fight he met Tot Hoggarth the bantamweight champion in the first of three meetings between the pair, being defeated in round twelve. In his rematch with Tot Hoggarth, on 6 October 1947 at Petone New Zealand he won by KO, setting the stage for the final showdown and the battle for the belt.

The Philp-Hoggarth battle took place on 21 February 1948 at the Petone Recreation Ground New Zealand. For the third and final time they would meet to decide the champion. Hoggarth was stopped by knock-out, Philp winning the New Zealand bantamweight title and the belt. He retained the belt until his eventual retirement from the ring on 6 June 1954, when he vacated the title.

In 1954 he stepped up to featherweight fighting Johnny Hanks for the vacant featherweight title, losing by KO in round eight.

== World Title Fight ==
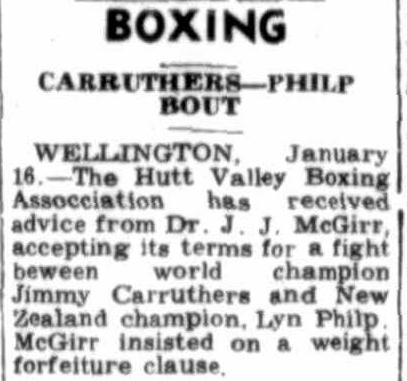
Townsville Daily Bulletin Queensland

He was matched for a world title bout against World Champion Jimmy Carruthers. For reasons unclear the fight never went ahead.

== Career record ==
6 Wins (2 knockouts, 4 decisions), 4 Losses (3 knockouts, 1 decision), 0 Draws
Result	Opponent	Type	Rd., Time	Date	Location	Notes
LOST	(New Zealand) Johnny Hanks	KO	8 (15)	14 June 1954	(New Zealand) Town Hall, Auckland	For vacant New Zealand featherweight title, after title vacated by Tom Batty's retirement
LOST	(New Zealand) Bob Goslin	PTS	10 (10)	1 June 1953	(New Zealand) Opera House, Wanganui	
Win	(New Zealand) Theo Green Jnr	PTS	10 (10)	29 December 1949	(New Zealand) Town Hall, Lower Hutt	
Win	(New Zealand) Theo Green Jnr	PTS	10 (10)	3 December 1949	(New Zealand) Municipal Theatre, Napier	
LOST	(New Zealand) Keith Francis	KO	4 (12)	13 June 1949	(New Zealand) Civic Theatre, Christchurch	
Win	(New Zealand) Archie Cahill	PTS	10 (10)	24 December 1948	(New Zealand) Petone Recreation Ground, Petone	
Win	(New Zealand) Tot Hoggarth	KO	10 (15)	21 February 1948	(New Zealand) Petone Recreation Ground, Petone	For New Zealand bantamweight title. Philp retired 6 June 1954, vacating the title
Win	(New Zealand) Tot Hoggarth	KO	9 (10)	6 October 1947	(New Zealand) Palace Theatre, Petone	
LOST	(New Zealand) Tot Hoggarth	KO	12 (15)	6 August 1947	(New Zealand) Municipal Theatre, Hastings	For New Zealand bantamweight title
Win	(New Zealand) Ronnie Hawes	PTS	10 (10)	21 April 1947	(New Zealand) Wellington Town Hall	

== Personal life ==
After retiring from the ring Lyn Philp opened a boxing gym where he became a trainer and coach.
