= Caterpillar Valley Cemetery =

WWI CWGC cemetery in Somme, France

- Commonwealth War Graves Commission
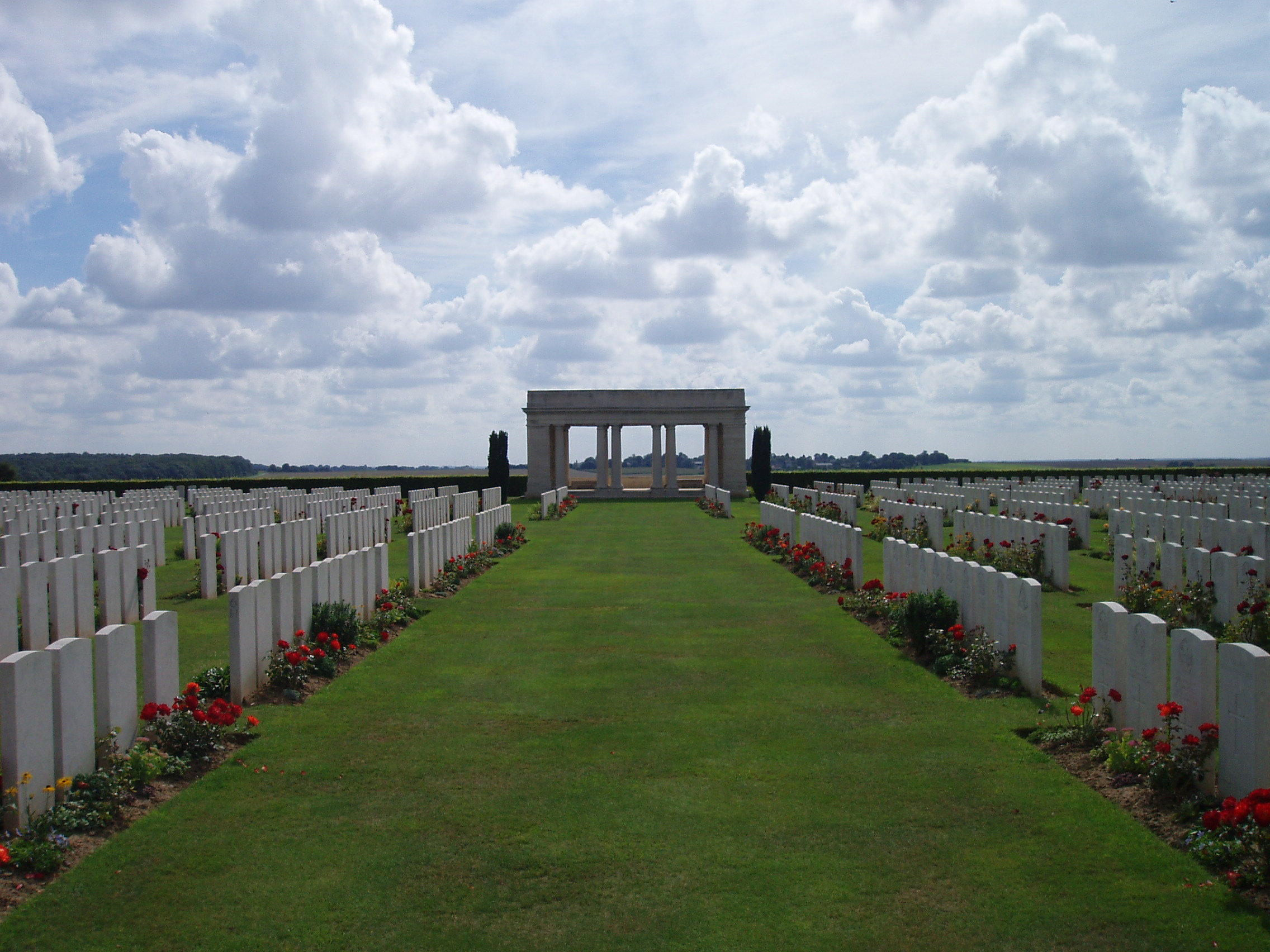
- For
- Location: 50°01′34″N 2°47′31″E; Longueval, France
- Designed by: Herbert Baker
- Total burials: 5,573

Caterpillar Valley Cemetery is a World War I Commonwealth War Graves Commission cemetery in Longueval, France.

The cemetery is named after Caterpillar Valley which was the name given by the British army to the long valley which rises eastwards to the high ground at Guillemont. The cemetery was established on 28 August 1918 following an advance by the 38th (Welsh) Division and initially contained 25 graves. The cemetery was greatly expanded after the war after remains for a number of other battlefield cemeteries were concentrated here. Most dead are from autumn 1916; the remainder being August or September 1918. The cemetery contains 214 New Zealand graves from the Battle of the Somme among the over 5000 graves, of which 3800 were unidentified. The cemetery and memorial were both designed by Herbert Baker.

== New Zealand Unknown Warrior ==
On 6 November 2004, the remains of an unidentified New Zealand soldier were exhumed by staff of the Commonwealth War Graves Commission from Caterpillar Valley Cemetery Plot 14, Row A, Grave 27. The remains were later laid to rest within the New Zealand Tomb of the Unknown Warrior at the National War Memorial, Wellington, New Zealand.

== Caterpillar Valley New Zealand Memorial ==
Within the cemetery, there is a Memorial to the Missing from New Zealand, recording the names of 1205 New Zealand soldiers who were killed during the Battle of the Somme and have no known final resting place. The Battle of the Somme was New Zealand's first major engagement on the Western Front. This is one of seven memorials in France and Belgium to New Zealand soldiers who died on the Western Front and whose graves are not known. No less than eight soldiers commemorated on the memorial have had their remains identified since the memorial was raised. This includes Bobby Black.
