= Longueval =

- Commune
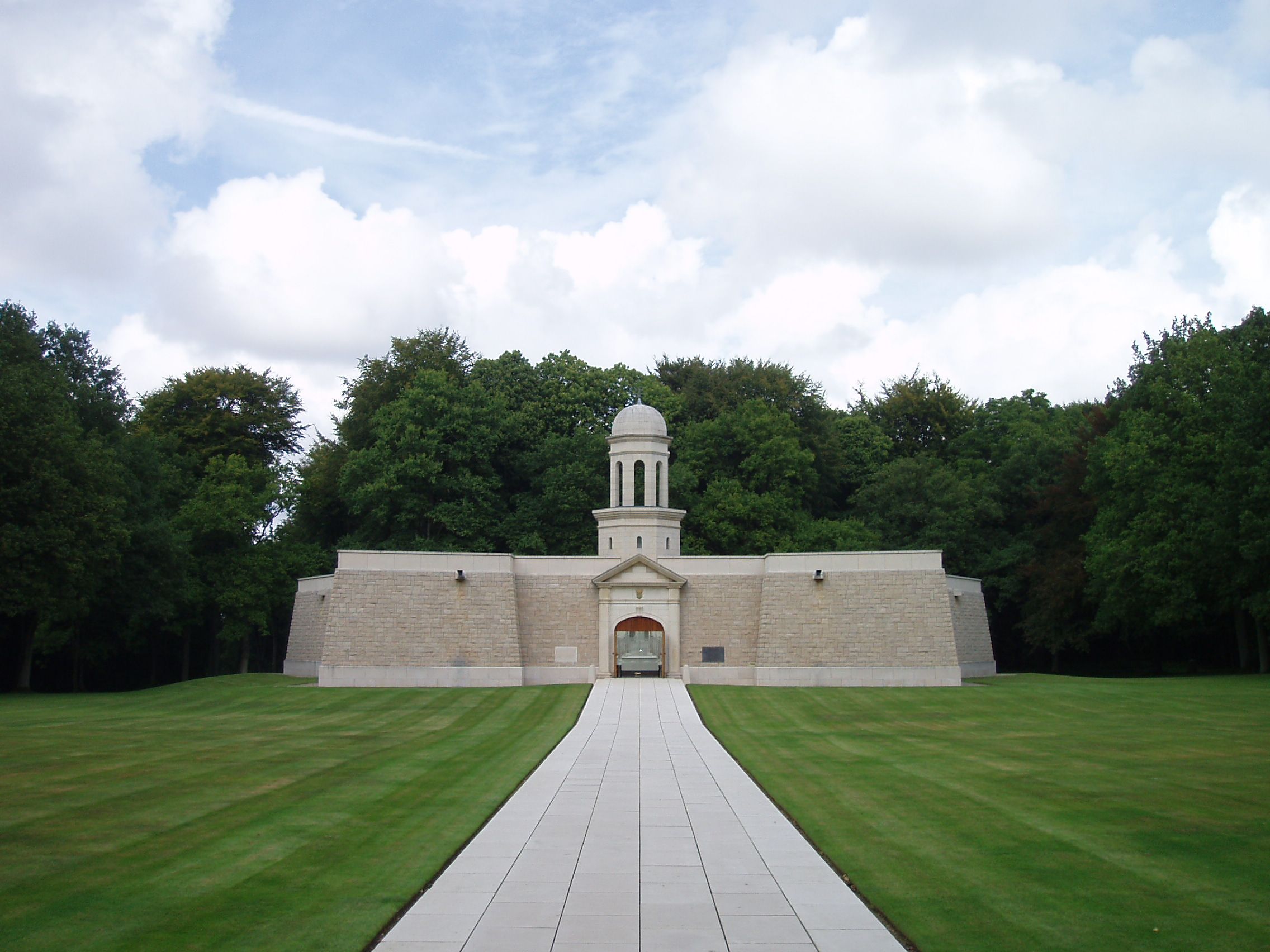
- South African Commemorative Museum
- Location of Longueval
- Location within France Location within Hauts-de-France
- Coordinates: 50°01′34″N 2°48′15″E
- Country: France
- Region: Hauts-de-France
- Department: Somme
- Arrondissement: Péronne
- Canton: Péronne
- Intercommunality: Haute Somme

Government
  - Mayor (2020–2026): Jany Fournier
- Area^{1}: 8.53 km^{2} (3.29 sq mi)
- Elevation: 150 m (490 ft)
- Highest elevation: 157 m (515 ft)
- Lowest elevation: 123 m (404 ft)
- Population (2023): 292
  - Density: 34.2/km^{2} (88.7/sq mi)
- Time zone: UTC+01:00 (CET)
  - Summer (DST): UTC+02:00 (CEST)
- INSEE/Postal code: 80490 /80360
- ^{1} French Land Register data, which excludes lakes, ponds, glaciers > 1 km^{2} (0.386 sq mi or 247 acres) and river estuaries.

Longueval (French pronunciation: [lɔ̃ɡval]) is a commune in the Somme department in Hauts-de-France in northern France.

== Geography ==
Longueval is located 38 km (24 mi) northwest of Amiens on the D919 road, at the junction with the D8.

Longueval is found in the north-east of the département, almost equidistant to the surrounding towns of Péronne (to the east), Albert (west) and Bapaume (north).

== Population ==
Historical population
Year	Pop.	±% p.a.
1968	307	—
1975	267	−1.97%
1982	278	+0.58%
1990	237	−1.97%
1999	248	+0.51%
2007	268	+0.97%
2012	280	+0.88%
2017	271	−0.65%
2023	292	+1.25%
Source: INSEE

== Heraldry ==
The coat of arms of the community were derived from the House of Longueval, Counts of Buquoy (later Bucquoy), and are blazoned as: Bendy of six vair and gules.

== History ==
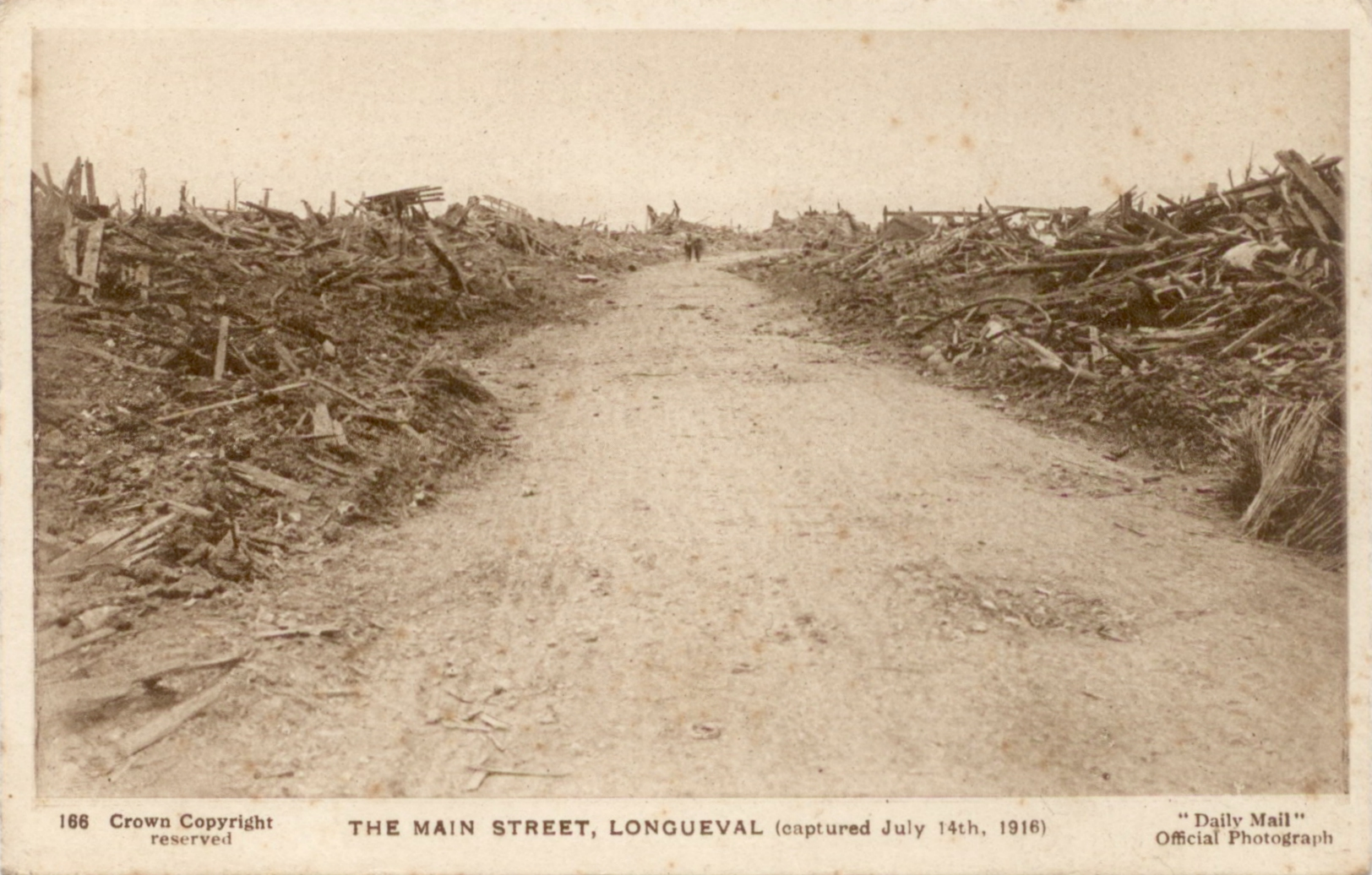
The main street in 1916

The village was almost completely destroyed during World War I.

=== World War I sites ===
Caterpillar Valley Cemetery is located outside Longueval, on the road to Bazentin. The cemetery also contains a Memorial to the Missing from New Zealand, recording the names of 1272 men lost in 1916. The body for the New Zealand Tomb of the Unknown Warrior was taken from here.

South of Longueval is the Longueval Road Cemetery. In the centre of the village is the Pipers' Memorial, built to commemorate bagpipers who fought in the First World War. Longueval was chosen because it was retaken by the 9th (Scottish) Division in July 1916. To the east of the village is the South African War Memorial Delville Wood.

On 21 October 2010, the Footballers' Battalions Memorial was unveiled at Longueval, near Delville Wood, to commemorate those from the Footballers' Battalions who had fought and died in the Great War.

== See also ==
- Delville Wood
- Communes of the Somme department
