= Lillian Chrystall =

New Zealand architect (1926–2022)

Lillian Chrystall OBE
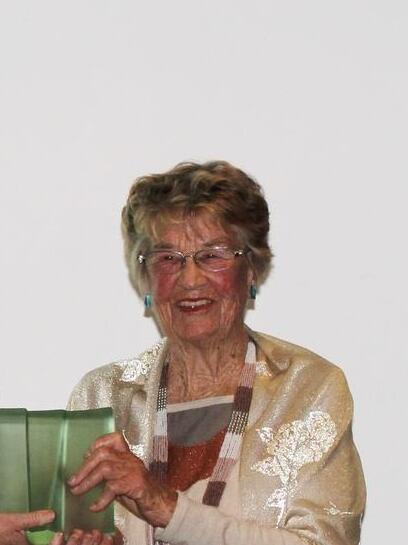
- Chrystall in 2014
- Born: Lillian Jessie Laidlaw; 1 March 1926; Auckland, New Zealand
- Died: 24 February 2022 (aged 95)
- Education: University of Auckland
- Occupation: Architect
- Practice: Chrystall Architects
- Relatives: Robert Laidlaw (father)

Lillian Jessie Chrystall OBE (née Laidlaw; 1 March 1926 – 24 February 2022) was a New Zealand architect. She was the first woman to receive a national New Zealand Institute of Architects award.

== Biography ==
Chrystall was born in the Auckland suburb of Herne Bay on 1 March 1926, one of three children of businessman Robert Laidlaw and American-born Lillian Viola Irene Laidlaw (née Watson). One of her brothers was Lincoln Laidlaw, who founded the New Zealand toy manufacturing company, Lincoln Industries. She was raised in Herne Bay, and was educated at Bayfield School and Auckland Girls' Grammar School. Chrystall studied architecture at the University of Auckland, one of only five women among the 1944 cohort of architectural students. She graduated in 1948, becoming a registered member of NZIA in the same year. After graduating, she was appointed the School of Architecture's first female instructor.

From 1950 to 1954, Chrystall worked in Europe. In England, she was hired by Ernő Goldfinger and worked on post-war reconstruction before moving to France. She joined André Sive's practice, designing low-cost housing Aubervilliers. Chrystall then returned to New Zealand and started her own architecture practice, Lillian Laidlaw Architects. In the late 1950s, her husband joined the practice and the business was renamed Chrystall Architects. Despite working in the practice together, the married couple kept projects separate. David worked on schools and community projects while Lillian worked on commercial buildings and, following the success of Yock House (1964), residential projects.

Chrystall Architects set up their practice on Airedale St in Auckland, where the couple also lived and raised their children. The Airedale St office became a gathering space for various architects, and artists between the 1950s-60s including Peter Bartlett, Bill Wilson, and Ivan Juriss.

Chrystall admitted as a fellow of the New Zealand Institute of Architects (NZIA) in 1974.

Chrystall also served on community organisations and was a founding member of the Auckland Zonta Club. She was the first woman on the board of trustees at the Auckland Savings Bank (ASB) and in 1983 became the first female president of the ASB Board.

== Notable projects ==
=== Yock House (1964) ===
Yock House in Ngāpuhi Road, Remuera was designed by Chrystall for Anthony Yock, in 1964. The site is steep, sloping down towards Orakei Basin and a series of stepped decks were designed to integrate the house into the landscape. The house features built-in timber furniture in the bedrooms and living area, as well as dark stained rafters and sliding doors reminiscent of Shoji screens.

Chrystall won a Bronze Medal from Te Kāhui Whaihanga NZIA in 1967 for the Yock House and became the first woman to receive a national NZIA award. In 2013, Yock House was awarded the Enduring Architecture Award at the NZIA Auckland Architecture Awards.

=== Other projects ===
- Lincoln Laidlaw House, Ōrākei, Auckland (1950s)
- Laidlaw House, Taupo (1950s) - reviewed in House and Building March 1954
- Fraser House, Hillsborough (1960s)
- ASB Bank, Pukekohe, Auckland (1960s)
- Chrystall House, Hapua St, Remuera, Auckland (1969)
- Kauri Loop Road House, Oratia (1974)
- (Philip) Yock House, Mission Bay, Auckland

== Recognition ==
In the 1989 New Year Honours, Chrystall was appointed an Officer of the Order of the British Empire, for public services.

Architecture + Women New Zealand named one of their annual excellence awards, the Chrystall Excellence Award, in her honour.

Chrystall Excellence Award Recipients
Year	Finalists	Winner	Source
2023	Anna-Marie Chin (Anna-Marie Chin Architects), Sue Evans (Kāinga Ora), Dr. Julia Gatley, Sharon Jansen (Sharon Jansen Architect), Jane Rooney (Architectus)	Sharon Jansen, Sharon Jansen Architect	
2020	Robin Allison (Earthsong Eco-Neighbourhood), Fiona Christeller (architecture FCA), Deborah Cranko (Cranko Architects), Anne Salmond (Salmond Architecture), Christina van Bohemen (Sills van Bohemen Architects)	Christina van Bohemen, Sills van Bohemen Architects	
2017	Jane Aimer and Lindley Naismith (Scarlet Architects), Clare Athfield (Athfield Architects), Megan Edwards (Megan Edwards Architects), Briar Green (Pearson and Associates), Sarah Treadwell (retired, The University of Auckland)	Sarah Treadwell, retired, The University of Auckland	
2014	Min Hall, Gina Jones, Lindy Leuschke, Sarah Scott, Julie Stout	Julie Stout, Mitchell and Stout Architects	

== Awards ==
- Auckland Branch Merit Award, NZIA (1957)
- Bronze Medal, Te Kāhui Whaihanga NZIA - York House (1967)
- Branch Award, NZIA - York House (1979)
- Enduring Architecture Award (York House), NZIA Auckland Architecture Awards (2013)

== Personal life and death ==
Chrystall married David Chrystall, who was also an architect, and they had three children. The couple separated in 1980.

Chrystall retired in 2011. She died on 24 February 2022 at the age of 95.
