= Julie Wilson (architect) =

New Zealand architectural practitioner

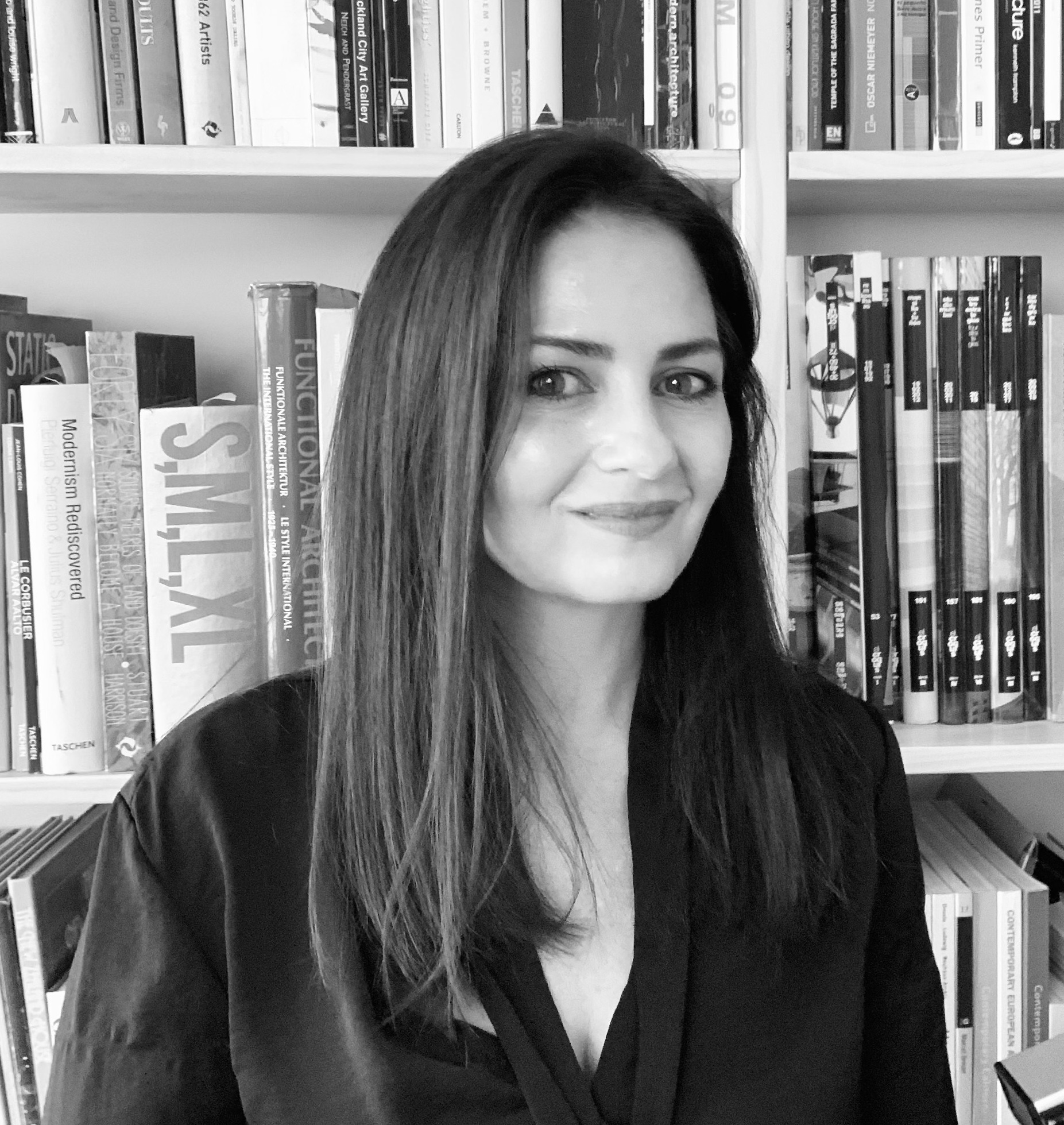
- Wilson in 2021
- Born: New Zealand
- Occupation: Architect

Julie Wilson, also known as Juliana Wilson, is a New Zealand architectural practitioner, (Note: Wilson is an architectural practitioner in New Zealand, but is not a registered architect, who are authorised by the New Zealand Registered Architects Board through the Registered Architects Act 2005.) academic and co-founder of the advocacy group Architecture + Women New Zealand (A+W NZ). She contributed to the award-winning The Chapel of St Peter by Stevens Lawson Architects.

== Career ==
Wilson co-founded Architecture + Women New Zealand (A+W NZ) in 2011, alongside Megan Rule, Lynda Simmons and Sarah Treadwell. A+W NZ is a national network and advocacy body. It received recognition in 2022 from the New Zealand professional body of architecture (New Zealand Institute of Architects) for ensuring that 'gender issues in New Zealand architecture are given consideration'. As an advocate for gender issues Wilson was interviewed in 2017 in the magazine M2 Woman speaking about motherhood and her architectural career.

Wilson is the founder of Dirty Laundry Architecture Ltd., a design and research business, and a teacher at University of Auckland's Waipapa Taumata Rau School of Architecture and Planning.

Wilson was part of the project team for the design of The Chapel of St Peter by Stevens Lawson Architects, which won the New Zealand Architecture Awards' 'Public Architecture Award' in 2020 awarded by Te Kāhui Whaihanga New Zealand Institute of Architects (NZIA).

Owing to her experience as an academic and practitioner, Wilson has served on national and international design awards juries, including being an invited judge at the World Architecture Festival in Singapore 2023.

=== Exhibitions ===
Wilson produced with others the exhibition Between Silos about women in architecture and design, one of four concurrent exhibitions across Aotearoa New Zealand in 2013, and was an editor for Snapshot 500, a publication based on the exhibition.

As part of Auckland Architecture Week 2020, Wilson and Megan Rule staged the exhibition The Ground is Talking to Us at Objectspace in Auckland, New Zealand. Within the Chartwell Gallery, a series of drawings, photographs and models highlighted the nature of architectural collaboration between Wilson, Rule and others over the past 20 years. The exhibition was developed by Te Kāhui Whaihanga New Zealand Institute of Architects.

=== Writing ===
Wilson is an author and has been published in ArchitectureNow and Architecture New Zealand. She authored the chapter New Models: The Landscape of Practice 2000–2020 in Making Space: a history of New Zealand women in architecture (2022) edited by Elizabeth Cox.

== Awards and honours ==
- 2022 – AAA Cavalier Bremworth Design Awards, Auckland Architectural Association
- 2003 – AAA Cavalier Bremworth Design Awards, Auckland Architectural Association
- 2006 – AAA Cavalier Bremworth Design Awards, Auckland Architectural Association
- 2014 – President's Award, Te Kāhui Whaihanga New Zealand Institute of Architects
- 2020 – Public Architecture Award, The Chapel of St Peter (member of project team of Stevens Lawson Architects)
- 2022 – Inaugural John Sutherland Practice Award (awarded to Architecture + Women New Zealand), Te Kāhui Whaihanga New Zealand Institute of Architects
