= Julia Gatley =

Architectural historian at the University of Auckland in New Zealand

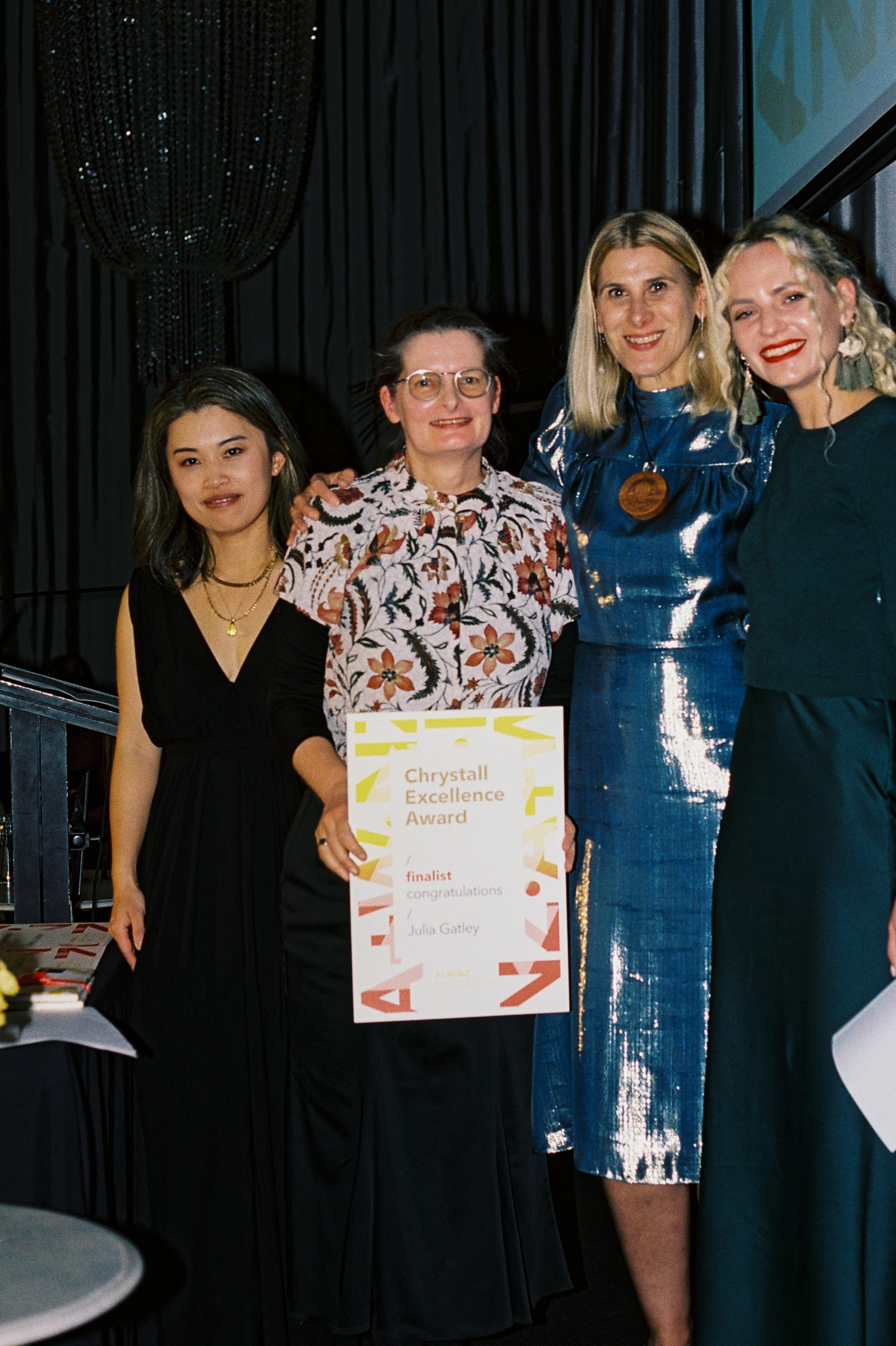
- Gatley (second from the left) in 2023.
- Born: New Zealand
- Education: Victoria University of Wellington
- Occupation: Architect

Julia Gatley is an architect, academic, architectural historian and author from New Zealand. As a historian and author Gatley has contributed knowledge about New Zealand's built landscape. She is the author of the book Athfield Architects about one of New Zealand's most well-known contemporary architects Ian Athfield and is a regular commentator about New Zealand's architectural history.

== Biography ==
Gatley studied architecture at Victoria University of Wellington (VUW) graduating in the 1980s. She received a Master of Architecture from VUW for her thesis "Labour takes command : a history and analysis of state rental flats in New Zealand 1935–1949". Her PhD was from Melbourne University for her thesis "Sex and the slum : imperialism and gender in nascent town planning, Australia and New Zealand, 1914–1919".

Gatley was a New Zealand Historic Places Trust conservation advisor after study. One building she researched while she was there is the Karitane Products Society Building in Wellington designed in the 1920s by William Gray Young.

In 2012 Gatley curated an exhibition called Athfield Architects at the City Gallery Wellington, and published a book of the same title (also in 2012) described by reviewer Marshall Cook as a 'comprehensive exploration'. Ian Athfield was one of New Zealand's leading architects who practiced from the 1960s through to at least 2012. Gatley met Ian Athfield when she at age 21 while she was studying in Wellington.

As a writer she has written a number of books especially focusing New Zealand's modern and post-modern architectural heritage. Gatley also contributes to the website Architecture Now and the magazine Architecture New Zealand. Gatley has authored entries in the Dictionary of New Zealand Biography including on Francis Gordon Wilson. The book Snapshot 500: Architecture + Women New Zealand (2013) co-edited with Sara Lee included documentation of the way women's careers has been covered in 'architectural history and the architectural press' which is a valuable contribution to feminist knowledge. Gately's book Long Live the Modern: New Zealand's New Architecture, 1904-1984 (2008) is said by author Elizabeth Cox to have saved from demolition some of the houses included.

Gatley is the historian of the Architectural Group, (later Group Architects) who formed as students in the 1940s to reform architectural education and outcomes. Gatley edited created a book that was about their practice and ideas called Group Architects: Towards a New Zealand Architecture (2010).

As an academic, Galtey has been a lecturer at the University of Tasmania and in 2006 became an associate professor at the University of Auckland at the School of Architecture and Planning, where was the Head from 2016 to 2018.

Gatley is a member of Architecture + Women NZ and in 2020 was a member of the jury for the triennial Architecture + Women NZ Dulux Awards. Gatley has also been on a jury for the New Zealand Institute of Architects annual awards including in 2019 and 2020.

== Book publications ==
- Long Live the Modern: New Zealand's New Architecture, 1904-1984 (2008) editor
- Group Architects: Towards a New Zealand Architecture (2010) editor
- Athfield Architects (2012) author
- Snapshot 500: Architecture + Women New Zealand (2013) co-edited with Sara Lee. Other creators Megan Rule, Lynda Simmons ISBN 978-0-9876595-5-2
- Vertical Living: The Architectural Centre and the Remaking of Wellington (2014) co-author with Paul Walker ISBN 9781869408152
- Brutalism Resurgent (2016) co-editor with Stuart King ISBN 9781138652361
- The Auckland School: 100 Years of Architecture and Planning: 2017 (2017) co-edited with Lucy Treep ISBN 9780473390396

== Academic papers ==
Selected publications:

- Davids and the Goliath at Downtown: Why Central Auckland’s Largest Post-War Urban Renewal Scheme Could Not Be Stopped by Julia Gatley and Luciana Guerra Santos Mota, Planning Perspectives, 2022
- Vulnerable, Even the Best of Them: New Zealand’s Modern Heritage Buildings, Routledge Companion to Global Heritage Conservation. Abingdon, Oxford: Routledge, pp. 443–59, 2019
- Beyond Futuna: John Scott, Modern Architecture and Māori in Aotearoa New Zealand, The Handbook of Contemporary Indigenous Architecture. Singapore: Springer, pp. 607–35, 2018
- The heritage identification of modern public housing: the New Zealand example, Journal of Architecture, 2010
- What’s in a Name?: The First House in New Zealand Architectural Discourse, Interstices: A Journal of Architecture and Related Arts, 2009
- Alison Shepherd (nee Sleigh), ARIBA: “Success of New Zealand Lady Student” Revisited, Fabrications: The Journal of the Society of Architectural Historians, Australia and New Zealand, 2007

== Awards ==
- Faculty of Creative Arts and Industries, Early Career Research Excellence Award, 2009
- New Zealand Institute of Architects, President's Award for Services to Architecture, 2009
- Elected Fellow of the New Zealand Institute of Architects (FNZIA), 2021
- University of Auckland, Early Career Research Excellence Award, 2010
