= Group Architects, New Zealand =

Auckland-based architecture group

The Group
- Architectural Group; Group Construction Company; Group Architects; Wilson & Juriss
- Formation: 1946
- Founded at: Auckland School of Architecture
- Dissolved: 1968
- Leader: Bill Wilson

Group Architects, also known as the Group, and existing under the names the Architectural Group, Group Construction Company and Wilson & Juriss, were a collection of architectural students turned architects who argued for and built a distinct style of New Zealand modern architecture. The Group went through many iterations, with changing names and memberships, but its advocacy for and practice of regional modernism was consistent.

The Group's architecture was influenced by post-war modernism, traditional Māori buildings and the New Zealand lifestyle. Key aspects of their designs were whare-style, low-pitch roofs, exposed timber, open-plan interiors, indoor–outdoor living and low-cost design.

== Philosophy and style ==
The Group argued for a New Zealand architecture that reflected the values of local and regional, physical and cultural contexts. Their ethos was fuelled by a surge in post-war nationalism and modernism and a reaction against the International Style.

The Group combined modernism with early New Zealand architectural forms such as the barn, the whare and simple colonial structures. They were interested, from their university years, in low-cost housing for the ordinary New Zealander, the 'Everyman'. Other aspects of their architecture were the use of timber, exposed beams, open-plan interiors and an attention to indoor–outdoor living. While they maintained an interest in urban issues, their output was mostly residential properties as these were buildings where nationalism could be fostered and reinforced. They were such proponents of a national architecture that when Ernst Plischke and Nikolaus Pevsner met some members of the Group, Plischke expressed concern that "the endeavour smells a bit of blood and soil".

The title of the 'Group' can refer to any four of its iterations: the Architectural Group, Group Construction Company, Group Architects and Wilson & Juriss.

== Architectural Group ==
In April 1946, a group of second-year architecture students at Auckland University College School of Architecture signed the constitution of the Architectural Group. The formation of the group was a response to what they viewed as the lack of an identifiable New Zealand architecture. Vernon Brown was a teacher at the Auckland School of Architecture during the time the Architectural Group were students, and was a leader among those concerned that state housing was inadequate and that a solution would need to represent the national character.

The Architectural Group published their manifesto, on the necessity of architecture (deliberately lowercase), after their first meeting. The manifesto is split into eight sections: society, the individual, techniques, beauty, politics, economics, philosophy, and the magazine. It laments badly planned built environments and calls for a harmonious, nationalised, modern approach to architecture. Its most central argument is: "...overseas solutions will not do. New Zealand must have its own architecture, its own sense of what is beautiful and appropriate to our climate and conditions." The manifesto referenced three overseas organisations as precedents for their work: the Deutscher Werkbund, the Modern Architectural Research Group, and the Association of Building Technicians.

The main contributor to the manifesto, was William (Bill) Douglas Wilson. At 27, he was the oldest of the Group and its de facto leader. The other five signatories on the document were Bruce Rotherham, Bill Toomath, Allan Wild, Marilyn Hart and Barbara Parker, whose name was added in her absence. Membership of the Architectural Group is fuzzy and contestable. While there were only six signatories on the founding document, members such as Bruce Rotherham state the group included many more students and recent graduates, as well as architect and teacher Vernon Brown.

The magazine mentioned in the manifesto is Planning, of which only one issue ever appeared. This magazine centred on social planning and further espouses the thinking of the manifesto, attempting to popularise the development of a New Zealand style of architecture. It critiqued architectural ornamentation and architectural education. It largely focussed on Wellington, as most members were Wellingtonians, and featured a brutal critique on Cecil Wood's St Paul's Cathedral in that city.

While they called for a New Zealand architecture, the Architectural Group struggled to define exactly what that may be. There was no mention of historical precedents in the Group's manifesto, but developing a distinctive New Zealand architecture can be traced to pre-war architects in the 1930s, such as Christchurch architect Paul Pascoe. His ideas anticipated the Group's modernist thinking. Pascoe looked to the first buildings of Pākehā settlers, and to the Māori whare, and argued for an architecture that responded to the local climate, materials and social life. Vernon Brown's advocacy for regionalism and simplicity also set precedents for the Group. The monotony of post-war state housing and its emulation of the English garden suburb house also provided modernist architectural thinkers with fodder, as these houses had no indoor–outdoor living, decks or verandahs.

=== Education reform ===
The Architectural Group's desire for change reached further than writing, as the Group led a revolt at the Auckland School of Architecture. In 1948—with burgeoning student numbers, inadequate resources and a controversial new professor of design—the students engaged in strikes and protests. A meeting was held in July 1948 that was attended by 142 of the 160 full-time architecture students, conveying a unanimous concern with the traditionalism and perceived limits of Charles Light, the new professor of design. Despite students' activism, which included appealing to the University Council, the School of Architecture did not overtly change during the 1940s and 1950s.

== Group Construction Company (1949–1951) ==
In 1949, many members of the now defunct Architectural Group built their first house together under the name Group Construction Company. The cohort who published their manifesto in second year had now completed four years of study, with just their final-year thesis left to complete. Bret Penman (not officially noted as part of the Architectural Group, but a fellow graduate) received money from his father to put his architectural education into practice alongside his classmates.

Group Construction Company was set up by seven students:

- Campbell Craig
- James Hackshaw
- Ivan Juriss
- Bret Penman
- Bruce Rotherham
- Allan Wild
- Bill Wilson

Over three years, Group Construction Company designed and built three houses: the First House, the Second House, and the Rotherham House. These houses, for which the Group are most well known today, espouse principles of plain, economical and unpretentious housing.

=== First House (1950) ===
First House was built in Takapuna, on the North Shore of Auckland. The house was credited by architect Miles Warren as being the "first expression of modern architecture in the country". At the time, many praised it as the first example of an indigenous modern architecture, setting it apart from modern houses by Brown, Plischke or Pascoe. It was originally named Experimental House, but in the late 1960s became known as first house after a building report by Graham Pitts referred to it that way. Peter Shaw was responsible for its capitalisation, when curating and producing work for the 1950s Show at the Auckland Art Gallery.

First House took some time to build, as the Group focused on the ethics of construction, and whether it was right to waste offcuts of timber. This was a key concern of the Group, who attempted to eliminate all types of excess in various ways: reducing the frame, exploring modules, and merging structure and joinery.

The house made obvious reference to New Zealand architectural forms and techniques, whilst still expressing the tenets of modernism. The house engaged in the modern movement to the extreme by completely stripping things back, revealing material and structure, and not masking reality. The posts, beams, rafters and sarking were left exposed, and the floor plan of the living room and dining room were left open. A key feature of the house is the shallow corrugated-iron roof, reminiscent of a whare, symbolism with which the Group became synonymous. There also seemed to be an interest in meeting the needs of all members of the family: the kitchen was no longer partitioned and the corridor connecting the children's bedrooms was widened to provide space for a playroom.

=== Second House (1950–1951) ===
The Second House is located in Takapuna, next door to the First House. It has many similar features as the First, such as the extensive use of timber and open-plan living, but its design was less cooperative. Each member submitted a sketch, and archives suggest Bill Wilson's was selected as winner. Second House heavily references the whare, causing neighbours to nickname it the 'Māori House'. Its low-pitched gable roof projects over the porch and entrance much like that of the whare. The Group responded to 'Māori House' by calling it the 'Pākehā House', as they, the builders, were all Pākehā. Whilst an economical build at the time, the house's most recent valuation was $2.65 million. The Second House, alongside the First House, is on the Auckland Council's Historic Heritage Places list.

=== Rotherham House (1951) ===
The Rotherham House was constructed in the Auckland suburb of Devonport, also on the North Shore, at the same time as the Second House. Bruce Rotherham took charge, designing and building the house for his family. He used a selection of stone, timber, brick and glass in constructing the house. Rotherham designed a much more radical house than previous Group designs for the 'Everyman'. A significant experimental feature of the house is a fully glazed two-storey wall. It was still built economically, with the national average residential construction cost at the time being £3 per square foot, and the Rotherham House only costing just over £1 per square foot.

== Group Architects (1951–1963) ==
The sale of the First and Second Houses, both sold before construction was complete, increased the Group's profile and led to the formation of Group Architects in 1951. Numerous friends and family commissioned houses, and the Group transitioned from designer–builders to an architectural practice. Robert Penman, the father of Bret Penman, sold Group Construction Company to Jack Abbott and Trevor Murphy, who changed the name to Murphy Abbott and who collaborated with Group Architects for many of their houses.

Group Architects functioned out of Auckland's Ferry Building. In this period, buildings designed by the Group were generally attributed to a single member rather than the cooperative. They continued to design economical houses that would be available for the 'Everyman', an ordinary New Zealander. Even in client-specific houses, they managed to cut costs using economical materials, minimal interior walls and stripped-back design. Their houses in the first few years as Group Architects carried on the theme of wide, gabled roofs, but soon the architects started diversifying their typology. They experimented in modular planning, prefabricated houses, extruded houses, geometric houses, nine-square and pyramidal houses, and courtyard houses.

Early in the 1950s, Group Architects worked with Modern Homes Inc., designing six houses for members of the cooperative. In all but one of these houses, Bret Penman took the design lead, while the sixth can be attributed to Bill Wilson. Outside of individual residential houses, the Group was commissioned to design medium- and high-density housing, but these buildings either never came to fruition or were subject to revisions that left many of the Group unsatisfied. They also designed a small number of recreational facilities, such as a bowling clubhouse in Takapuna, numerous kindergartens across the greater Auckland region, and various industrial buildings for clients.

Members began to leave the Group as early as 1952, citing reasons such as inadequate work opportunities and overseas travel. Bill Wilson and Ivan Juriss were the only two constant members, and by 1958, upon the resignation of James Hackshaw, were the only two remaining. They functioned as the Group Architects until mid-1963 when they moved buildings and renamed the firm Wilson & Juriss.

Notable works	Date	Location	Attributed designer	Notes
Catley House	1951–1953	Quebec Road, Milford	Bill Wilson	Appeared in Home and Building 1953, photographs held at National Library of New Zealand
George House	1951–1952	New Lynn	James Hackshaw	Featured in Design and Build in Aug–Sep 1955 and Home and Building, February 1955
Thom House	1954	Morningside	Hackshaw	House planned around an open courtyard
Zena Abbott House	1954–1955	Blockhouse Bay	Unspecified	Published in 1955 Home and Building article "3 Houses under 2,500 pounds"
Juriss House	1953–1956	Stanley Bay	Ivan Juriss	Japanese influence
Tremain House	1958–1959	Takapuna	Unspecified	Appeared in Home and Building under title "A Small House Among the Trees"

== Wilson and Juriss (1963–1968) ==
Wilson & Juriss evolved out of Group Architects, as Bill Wilson and Ivan Juriss were the only two left working together and could no longer consider themselves a 'group'. Other members of the Group went on to practise individually, in New Zealand or overseas. Wilson had recently begun a part-time teaching role at the Auckland Architecture School, so Juriss was central to the functioning of the practice. Many houses of this period moved away from strictly economical and rational design, with builds for wealthier clients being much grander. The Robertson House in Glendowie (1961–1963) and the now demolished Lowe House in Epsom (1963–1965) are examples of this change, with the Robertson House being the biggest house attributed to the Group. Wilson & Juriss operated until 1968, closing upon Wilson's premature death.

== Women in the Group ==
Two women—Marilyn Hart and Barbara Parker—were part of the six original signatories of the Group's manifesto. For the 1950s, and especially within the architectural profession, this was quite rare. However, these two women had moved on by the time Group Construction Company was formed, neither of them graduating and both taking routes outside of dedicated architectural practice.

In articles published by and about the Group in the 1950s, it was emphasised how low-cost housing was targeted at giving 'the man in the street' a house he deserved. The gendered language was not unusual for the time but does emphasise how a woman's domestic work often remained invisible. The Group argued that careful planning of households could reduce housework, but despite the rhetoric, their houses were designed with very small laundries and bathrooms, reflecting a lack of awareness around the realities of housework. Planning 1, the Architectural Group's first and only publication, states that part of the rationale behind compact, open-plan living and dining spaces is that wives then do not have to walk much between the kitchen and the front door. The attempts to rationalise the way people lived through housing ended up reframing itself as an attack on the concerns of women. The National Council of Women lobbied against low-cost housing and open-plan living in the 1950s, arguing it put more pressure on housewives to maintain cleanliness of the entire entry/living space. This saw many Group houses in the latter parts of the decade reintroduce separate entryways.

Women associated with the group, such as Freddie Hackshaw and Marilyn Reynolds, recall the sexism of the men in the Group towards their wives, treating them with little respect.

== Māori symbolism in Group architecture ==
Bill Wilson conveyed an interest in Māori culture and issues. He wanted to design Māori welfare housing, tailoring it to the differing needs of Māori families compared to those of Pākehā families. Wilson attempted to collaborate with John Scott in this endeavour, drafting a report titled Suggestions for consideration by Māori representatives that contained plans to consult with Māori in the building process. Archival records demonstrate no further action in this initiative.

Post-war architects in New Zealand like the Group used the Māori wharenui (meeting house) as a significant design reference to convey their nationalist agenda. When discussing their first two houses with journalists, they emphasised: "The Maoris have lived here for hundreds of years... they evolved a style of house suited to the climate, and that is exactly what we are doing." The Group was invoking the form of the whare in their architecture due to its longevity as a building structure in New Zealand and also to create a vernacular architecture specific to New Zealand. However, the whare was the sole symbol of Māori architecture used by the Group, which had the effect of homogenising Māori society and culture into a singular form. The whare itself exists in many different forms, with authorial, regional and generational differences. Its purpose is also more than aesthetic, it is symbolic, and the carving, painting and weaving are as essential as its structure. The modernist drive of the Group to strip design of any decoration or detail suppressed the cultural meaning behind the form. The Group's use of whare symbolism may have been supporting, assimilating or appropriating Māori architecture, but it did paint a false image of Māori culture to Pākehā architects and historians.

== Legacy ==
The Group's legacy is complicated, not just because of the vagueness of its many names. They have become synonymous with regional modernism and almost mythologised in the architectural canon, but it is unclear when or where their fame began. They were often mentioned as a point of reference in architectural literature, but until 2010, no historical work investigating the Group existed. Auckland Art Gallery's 1950s Show in 1992 included a partial recreation of the First House and it contributed somewhat to the mythologising of the Group, but reverence to the Group is not explicitly tied to this house.

Allan Wild was appointed professor of design at the University of Auckland in 1969, replacing the controversial Charles Light, to whose teaching Wild had objected when he was a student. Wild taught for 23 years, having a significant impact on the School of Architecture and its students. Bill Wilson also taught at the school in the 1960s, before his death in 1968.

The 2001 New Zealand Institute of Architects' Gold Medal was awarded to the Architectural Group. Twelve individuals received medals and certificates: Campbell Craig, the late James Hackshaw, Ivan Juriss, the late Barbara Parker, Breton Penman, Ian Reynolds, Marilyn Reynolds, Bruce Rotherham, William Toomath, Anthony Treadwell, Allan Wild and the late Bill Wilson. The award was contested by the winners themselves, as four of the members were not a part of the iteration 'The Architectural Group', but belonged to later Group formations.

Many of the Group's buildings, residential and commercial, have been demolished or moved from their original locations.
