= Vladimir Čačala =

Czech-born New Zealand architect

- Born: Vladimír Čačala; 1926; Prague, Czechoslovakia
- Died: 2007 (aged 80–81); New Zealand
- Education: Czech Technical University
- Occupation: Architect
- Practice: Brenner Associates (1952–1959)
- Buildings: Blumenthal House (or Mondrian House)

Vladimir Čačala (Czech: Vladimír Čačala; 1926–2007) was a Czech-born New Zealand architect. He was a proponent of the International Style in Auckland. Čačala built several private residential properties and high-density buildings across Auckland from the 1950s to 1970s, most notably the Blumenthal House.

== Early life ==
Vladimir Čačala was born in 1926 in Prague, Czechoslovakia. Čačala was born to furniture manufacturer Vladimir T. Čačala, in a region where furniture making had a long tradition. Czechslovakia was a hub of functionalist architecture during the 1920s and 1930s. Within this surge of modernism were ideals such as developing public buildings and housing for public good. In Čačala's youth, he experienced this culture of contemporary design, visiting new builds such as Adolf Loos's Villa Müller and Mies van de Rohe's Villa Tugendhat.

In the late 1930s, Czechoslovakia was invaded and annexed by Nazi Germany, remaining that way until 1944. When universities opened at the end of World War II, Čačala enrolled at the Czech Technical University in Prague. His education here was heavily influenced by Bauhaus-inspired teachers and design principles.

In 1948, Czechoslovakia was subsumed by the Soviet Union and private architectural practice was banned. Čačala's father was declared an enemy of the people and promptly disappeared. In September 1949, Čačala escaped to Bavaria, which was occupied by the United States. In 1950, the United Nations's International Refugee Organization granted him passage to Melbourne within a Displaced Persons Programme which brought 170,000 immigrants to Australia during this period. Čačala worked in Sydney for a while, before discovering his father was living in New Zealand, having escaped Czechoslovakia six months before his son. Čačala moved to Auckland on Christmas Day in 1952, reuniting with his father.

== Career ==
Upon his arrival to Auckland, Čačala was hired by Brenner Associates to help with their furniture design. Brenner Associates were known to introduce modernist, European ideas and decoration to Auckland. Čačala worked here until 1959, leaving the firm after seven years to begin his own architectural practice with Walter Leu.

Čačala is best known for his private, residential builds but he was also a key figure in spearheading the development of higher density housing in Auckland, New Zealand. High density housing was unusual to New Zealanders in the 1950s and was generally associated with Europe. But as urban populations continued expanding after World War II and low-to-middle class groups struggled to afford suburban, detached housing, multi-unit housing became a more attractive idea. In 1949, the election of a new National government in New Zealand saw private investors developing flats to create more affordable housing. Vladimir Čačala built his first block of flats in 1954 at 100 St Stephen's Avenue, Parnell. His flats tended to explore Bauhaus concepts and sculptural geometry. It was in his own practice when the majority of his flats and apartments were built, in areas such as Parnell, Mount Eden and Ōrākei.

There were multiple other émigré European architects operating during this period in New Zealand, like Henry Kulka, Tibor Donner and Ernst Plischke, who were big advocates for the international modern. Čačala's architectural modernism directly opposed the vernacular 'shed' tradition espoused by Vernon Brown and the Group Architects. Contemporaries of Čačala, as well as later architects, critiqued him for this adherence to international models. Čačala did concede to the physical conditions of the New Zealand climate, adapting his builds to include overhang or a veranda, protecting the owner from the harsh sun.

== Notable works ==
Čačala worked as an architect in Auckland from 1954 until 1978. He is most commonly recognisable for his modern, international style residential works.

=== Gelb House (1955) ===
In 1955, Brenner Associates were commissioned by émigrés Ernst and Ilse Gelb to design a house, of which Vladimir Čačala is credited as the main designer. The Austrian couple had an interested in contemporary European architecture. The exterior of Gelb House is relatively plain, constructed to 'deny interest'. The interior, however, employed the bright colour scheme of Milan Mrkusich, an artist involved with Brenner Associates.

=== Tapper House (1957) ===
Tapper House is a mid-century modern house located in Kohimarama, Auckland and was designed for artist Garth Tapper and his family. It mixes Čačala's international modernism with local materials, such as timber and stone. Its exaggerated, rectangular form sits upon a supportive structure, giving it the appearance of a floating house. It boasts a blue, yellow and white colour scheme both internally and externally.

The house has featured in television advertisements in New Zealand, for companies such as The Warehouse and Burger King.

=== Blumenthal House (1959) ===
The Blumenthal House was built for Russian-Jewish émigré Raye Blumenthal Freedman and her first husband, Ernest Blumenthal, a Jewish refugee from Czechoslovakia. It is located in St Heliers, Auckland. The house is exemplerary of the international modern style. Key features of the house is its bluestone entrance, cantilevered living room and two-storey high glass. Drawing in local elements, Čačala used bluestone to clad the stairs, an indigenous volcanic stone in Auckland. Čačala's use of red and yellow in sections of the house emulated the coloured abstractions of Piet Mondrian and has given the Blumenthal House the moniker 'Mondrain House'.

Blumenthal House is considered the most internationally known New Zealand modernist building. It featured in the Los Angeles magazine Arts and Architecture, as well as Gio Ponti's Milan magazine Domus. The Blumenthal's remained good friends and became business partners with Čačala, investing in his housing developments.
