= Salm =

Salm may refer to

== People ==
- Christopher Salm (born 1994), German politician
- Constance de Salm (1767–1845), poet and miscellaneous writer; through her second marriage, she became Princess of Salm-Dyck
- Kat Salm, New Zealand geospatial scientist
- Salm ibn Ziyad, an Umayyad governor of Khurasan and Sijistan
- House of Salm, a European formerly ruling family
  - Salm-Reifferscheid-Raitz

== Geography ==
- Salm (state), a historic principality with territories in present Germany, Belgium and France
- partitions of the state
  - Salm-Horstmar
  - Salm-Kyrburg
  - Salm-Reifferscheid-Dyck
  - Salm-Reifferscheid-Hainsbach
  - Salm-Reifferscheid-Krautheim
  - Salm-Salm
- Salm, Germany, a municipality in Rhineland-Palatinate, Germany
- Salm, Chaharmahal and Bakhtiari, Iran
- Salm, West Azerbaijan, Iran
- Salm Island, an island in Franz Josef Land, Russia

=== Rivers ===
- Salm (Moselle), in Germany, tributary to the river Moselle
- Salm (Amblève), in Belgium, tributary to the river Amblève

== Other uses ==
- Salm, the IAU-approved proper name of the star Tau Pegasi
- Salm (Shahnameh), a character in Persian epic Shahnameh

== SALM ==
- Suid-Afrikaanse Lugmag, or South African Air Force
- The stock ticker symbol of Salem Communications, a U.S. religious radio broadcaster, Internet content provider, and magazine and book publisher
