= Oosterhoff =

Oosterhoff is a surname. Notable people with the surname include:

- Hedda Oosterhoff, interior acoustic designer born in Holland and living in New Zealand
- Pieter Oosterhoff, Dutch astronomer
- Sam Oosterhoff, Canadian politician
- Tonnus Oosterhoff, Dutch poet

== See also ==
- 1738 Oosterhoff, minor planet
