= Sarah Treadwell =

Architecture academic in New Zealand

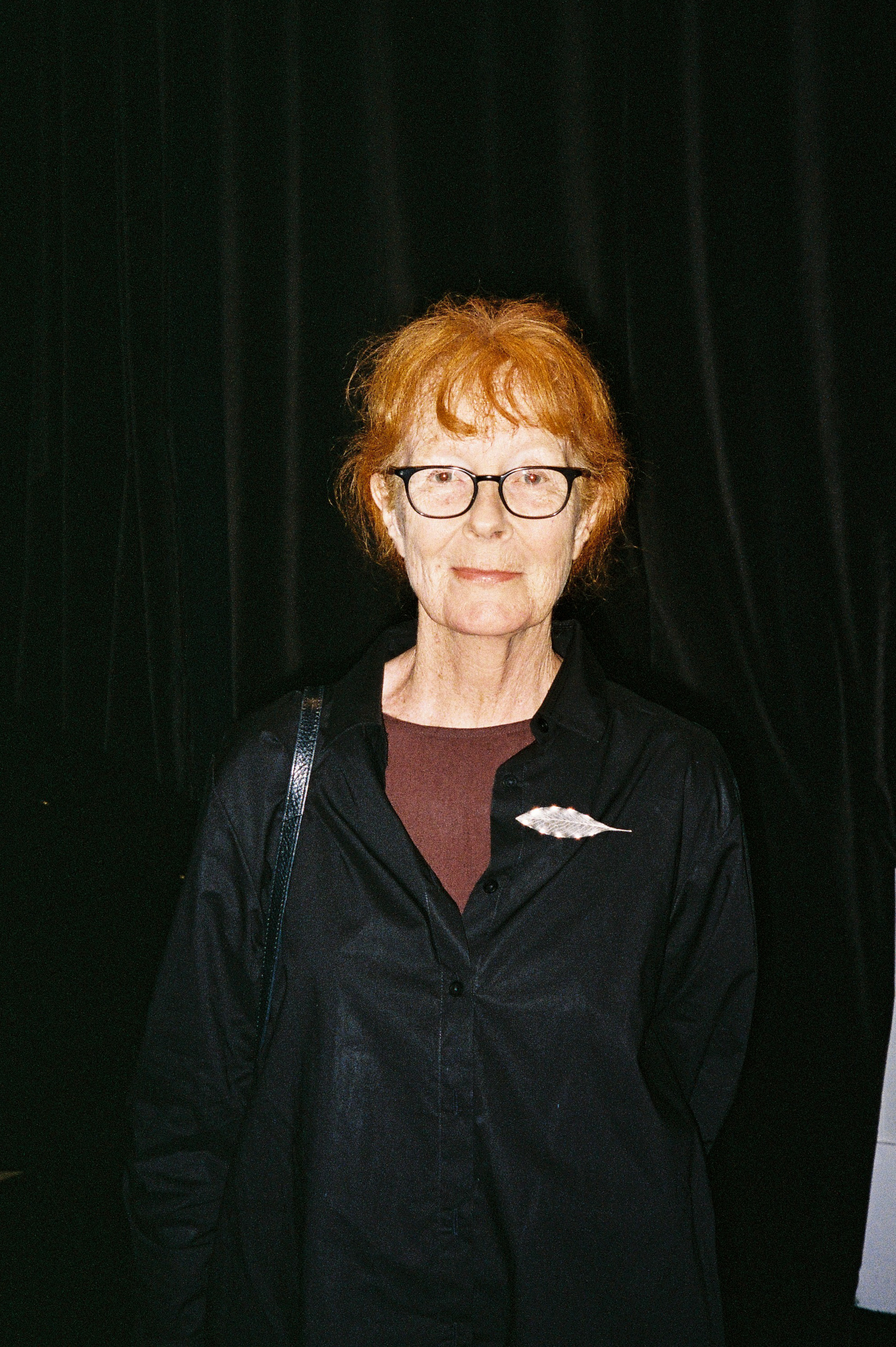
- Treadwell in 2023
- Occupations: Architect, artist, academic
- Awards: Chrystall Excellence Award; NZIA President's Award

Academic background
- Education: University of Auckland; Unitec Institute of Technology
- Thesis: Keeping watch : fabricating a space of hesitation (2018)
- Academic advisors: John Pusateri, Richard Fahey

Academic work
- Institutions: University of Auckland
- Notable students: Lynda Simmons

Sarah Treadwell is a New Zealand artist, architect and academic. She was the first female full-time academic staff member in the School of Architecture and Planning at the Waipapa Taumata Rau the University of Auckland in New Zealand. Her academic career spanned from 1981 to 2017, her year of retirement. Treadwell was Head of School at the School of Architecture and Planning from 2009 to 2012.

== Career ==
Treadwell graduated from the University of Auckland in 1976, before practising in London. She gained her registration as an architect in 1978. In 1980, the Women's Institute of Architecture wrote an open letter to the head of the University of Auckland's School of Architecture and Planning, Allan Wild, pointing out that the lack of women lecturers was alienating female students. The following year, Treadwell became the first woman to be appointed to the faculty, although she remained the only one for ten years, until Rosemary Scofield's appointment.

In 1991, Treadwell contributed to the exhibition Home Made Home at the City Gallery Wellington.

Treadwell completed her PhD in 1995 in the field of New Zealand architectural history, looking specifically at Rangiatea, the Māori Church at Ōtaki that was destroyed by fire in 1995. She delivered the sixth Gordon H. Brown Art History lecture at Victoria University of Wellington in 2008, titled Rangiatea Revisited.

Treadwell completed a Master of Design degree in 2018 at the Unitec Institute of Technology. Her thesis, titled Keeping watch: fabricating a space of hesitation involved the production of artwork around the MV Rena striking the Astrolabe Reef in 2011. She was Head of School at the School of Architecture and Planning from 2009 to 2012, and retired in 2017.

Treadwell is interested in gender issues in architecture, and taught a course on gender in architecture from 1986 onwards (first called Women and Architecture, and then Engendering Architecture). Most of the content in the early years focused on overseas women, but later included New Zealand architects. Students from her course interviewed Muriel Lamb, whose contributions to architecture had to this point been overlooked. In 1983, Treadwell presented to the 'Gone to Kiwi' Architecture Student Congress in Auckland about whether women and men designed differently. Research Treadwell conducted with Nicole Allan in 2012 found that from 2002 to 2011 only 19 per cent of contributors to Architecture New Zealand were women, with a similar bias in the names listed in project credits. Treadwell's 2015 book with Lucy Treep, Architecture in an Expanded Field, examines the careers of New Zealand women "at the edges of architecture".

Treadwell was a co-founder of Architecture + Women NZ (A+W NZ), along with Lynda Simmons, Julie Wilson and Megan Rule. She is also a practising artist, and researched in the field of architectural drawing. Treadwell's leadership in the area of architectural drawing is credited with causing the adoption of sophisticated drawing methods at the university in the 1980s. Her 2012 ink and watercolour Rena featured in the book Snapshot 500.

== Awards and honours ==
Treadwell was awarded a New Zealand Institute of Architects President's Award in 2013. She was awarded a Chrystall Excellence Award in 2017, the award "celebrates the full and rich career of a female in the field of architecture."

In 2017, the A+W NZ Tātuhi/Drawing Architecture archive was set up by Lynda Simmons to honour Treadwell's impact and career, it being the year of her retirement. The archive collects architectural drawings, chosen by Treadwell and a team, as a growing record of architectural drawing styles over time.

== Publications and exhibitions ==
- Drawing Is/Not Building (2015) - an exhibition by Roland Snooks, Sarah Treadwell, Simon Twose. Te Pataka Toi Adam Art Gallery
- Drawing Is/Not Building (2016) - a book published by Te Pātaka Toi Adam Art Gallery at Te Herenga Waka—Victoria University of Wellington. Edited by Christina Barton, Sarah Treadwell and Simon Twose ISBN 978-1-877309-35-9

== Personal life ==
Treadwell is the daughter of architect Anthony Treadwell. She is a mother to two children.
