= Elisapeta Heta =

New Zealand architect

- Born: Rānui, Auckland, New Zealand
- Education: University of Auckland
- Occupation: Architectural graduate
- Awards: Rising Star Award of the National Association of Women in Construction (New Zealand) Excellence Awards, Te Kāhui Whaihanga New Zealand Institute of Architects President's Award
- Practice: Jasmax

Elisapeta Hinemoa Heta is a New Zealand Māori architectural graduate. She is affiliated to the Ngāti Wai and Waikato Tainui iwi (tribes). She also has Samoan and Tokelauan heritage. Heta was the recipient of a National Association of Women in Construction (New Zealand) Excellence Award in 2018.

== Biography ==
Heta at the 2026 A+W NZ Dulux Awards

The Porters Avenue Footbridge, designed by Heta as a part of Jasmax

Heta grew up in a small cottage in Rānui, West Auckland, and later in Te Atatū North. Her mother was a school caretaker and cleaner, and her father was a security guard. She attended Ranui Primary School, Te Atatū Peninsula Primary School, Te Atatū Intermediate School and Rutherford College.

She enrolled to study architecture at the University of Auckland in 2007, and went on to complete two master's degrees: one in architecture and another in museums and cultural heritage. After graduating, she took a series of short-term contracts, including for DesignTRIBE, in television and film, and also travelled to the United States. On her return, she worked with Lynda Simmons to prepare an exhibition for Architecture + Women NZ, which was staged in 2013.

In 2015, she joined architectural design firm Jasmax and began to work with three other Māori architectural graduates to bring Māori design principles to the firm's projects and to engage with local iwi and hapu. She later became a principal architect at the company. At Jasmax, she has worked on projects such as the New Zealand Pavilion at Expo 2020 in Dubai, the Fale Malae project in Wellington, the Western Springs College Ngā Puna O Waiōrea development and infrastructure such as stations and pedestrian bridges for the Auckland City Rail Link project.

Heta was a New Zealand Institute of Architects board member from 2016 to 2019. She was co-opted to the board to represent Ngā Aho, a national network of Māori design professionals. She was instrumental in the process which gifted the Institute a Māori language name, Te Kāhui Whaihanga, and also co-wrote and implemented Te Kawenata o Rata (a covenant) between Ngā Aho and the institute, recognising Te Tiriti o Waitangi. She joined Architecture + Women NZ in 2013 and co-chaired the organisation in 2017 and 2018.

In 2022, Heta was appointed co-director of the UIA (International Union of Architects) Indigenous Peoples Work Programme.

=== Awards and recognition ===
In 2018, she won the Rising Star Award (office-based category) at the National Association of Women in Construction (New Zealand) Excellence Awards. In 2022, Heta received a Te Kāhui Whaihanga New Zealand Institute of Architects President's Award.

In 2026, Heta was awarded the Munro Diversity Award.
