= Allan Wild =

New Zealand architect and academic (1927–2019)

- Born: Allan Arthur Wild; 20 February 1927; Feilding, New Zealand
- Died: 11 February 2019 (aged 91); Auckland, New Zealand
- Education: Auckland University College
- Occupation: Architect

Allan Arthur Wild (20 February 1927 – 11 February 2019) was a New Zealand architect and architecture academic. He was a founding member of the Architectural Group in Auckland, which made an important contribution to modern architecture in New Zealand, and later served as head of the School of Architecture at the University of Auckland from 1969 to 1993.

== Early life and family ==
Born in Feilding on 20 February 1927, Wild was the son of Geoffrey Victor Wild and Harriett Newport Wild (née Porter). He was educated at Hutt Valley High School in Lower Hutt, where he was a contemporary of Bill Toomath. Wild went on to study architecture at Auckland University College, graduating Bachelor of Architecture in 1951.

== Architectural practice ==
After leaving school, Wild worked in the office of the Government Architect in Wellington during 1944, before going to Auckland to study architecture. While at university, he was a founding member of the Architectural Group, participating in the construction of the "First House" and "Second House".

Returning to Wellington in 1952, Wild found employment as an architect with the Wellington City Council, and quickly won promotion to architect-in-charge. From about 1956 to 1958, he partnered with Anthony Treadwell in the firm Treadwell and Wild in Wellington, practising modernism and the development of a national and regional style of architecture. Buildings designed by the practice during this period include the Etherton House, Hope House, Dobbie House, Doreen Blumhardt House, and Hazel Court, a modernist apartment building. Both Wild and Treadwell were active members of the Wellington Architectural Centre.

Between 1959 and 1964, Wild was an associate at Porter & Martin, and from 1964 to 1969 he was a director of the architectural division of William's Holdings.

== Academic career ==
Wild was appointed professor of architecture at the University of Auckland in 1969, serving as head of the School of Architecture and dean of the Faculty of Architecture until his retirement in 1993. Upon his retirement, he was accorded the title of professor emeritus.

== Honours ==
Wild was a Fellow of the New Zealand Institute of Architects and a Fellow of the Royal Society of Arts. In 1992, he was made a life member of the New Zealand Institute of Architects.

== Death ==
Wild died in Auckland on 11 February 2019, nine days before his 92nd birthday.
