= Marilyn Reynolds (architectural writer) =

New Zealand architectural writer

- Born: 29 August 1927, Christchurch, New Zealand
- Died: 31 August 2015 (aged 88)
- Occupations: Author, Architectural Assistant, Draughtsman
- Known for: Founding member of Auckland's Group Architects

Marilyn Reynolds (née Hart; 29 August 1927 – 31 August 2015) was a New Zealand architectural writer. She was one of the first female architecture students post-WWII at the University of Auckland and played a key role in the architectural community across New Zealand. Her name is amongst the first six signatories of the University of Auckland Architectural Group's manifesto. She was specifically interested in solving social inequities through architecture.

== Early life ==
Marilyn was born in Christchurch on 29 August 1927. Throughout her childhood, she was exposed to architecture as a subject through architectural drawing and magazines.

== Education ==
Enrolment in Auckland University's School of Architecture dipped during WWII, but grew steadily as the war ended. Marilyn started university in 1945, moving up from Wellington straight after leaving secondary school. She stayed for a few years before leaving without graduating, as her parents could no longer provide financial support. At the school, women were faced with an overly masculine, sometimes chauvinistic environment. Reynolds recalled encountering conservative teaching styles, where women's ideas were equated with communist ideas.

=== The Architectural Group ===
Conservative and traditional teachings styles at the University of Auckland led to the creation of the Architectural Group, later known as the Group Construction Company and then the Group Architects. This alliance of university students aimed to reform architectural education and its professions, promoting modern design for the betterment of built environments. Marilyn is considered to be one of the seven founding members of the Group. She is noted in attendance at the reading of the Group's 1946 manifesto and her signature is on the document.

== Career ==
Marilyn never registered as an architect due to her incomplete degree, but on returning to Wellington in 1948 she took up a job as a draughtsman and architect for Crichton, McKay & Haughton. Here Marilyn became a student member of the Architectural Centre, alongside Barbara Parker, the only other female member of the Architectural Group. The Architectural Centre was an organisation created in 1946, by noteworthy architects such as Gordon Wilson and Ernst Plischke, to address the planning of the urban environment through modernist ideas.

In 1949, Marilyn moved to London to join her soon-to-be husband, architect Ian Reynolds. They lived first in London, then Coventry, where she worked as a draughtsman for the council and designed social housing in the aftermath of WWII. Between 1951 and 1952, she planned a neighbourhood and shopping centre for the war-damaged city. She encountered head draughtsmen and architects who "...were all from middle class families" and "... had no idea what went on in the kitchen." Reynolds made suggestions on how these kitchens could become more practical for women. While Marilyn's opinion had little weight, she would bring along books that reinforced her ideas and had some success in influencing design changes.

Marilyn and Ian returned to New Zealand in 1952 and settled in Wellington. Marilyn, alongside Ian, restarted her involvement in the Architectural Centre. The couple and their family then moved to Auckland when Ian was offered a role at a firm which became Kingston, Reynolds, Thom & Allardice (KRTA). Marilyn and Ian designed their own house in Howick, Auckland, in 1961. Much like her focus on domestic spaces in the United Kingdom, Marilyn had specific interest in designing these in her own house. The playroom connected four small children's rooms and the living room, exemplifying an approach grounded in functionality. Marilyn and Ian designed two other houses together – their subsequent home in Parnell and a bach on Auckland's West Coast.

=== Architectural writing ===
After raising her six children, Marilyn restarted her direct involvement in the architectural community. Her first book Woman's World: Houses and Suburbs, written alongside Stephanie Bonny, was published in 1976. Stephanie and Marilyn had studied together at Auckland University. Their book was published for the Society for Research on Women and explored the lives of women in postwar state houses, breaking ground on the intersection of women and architecture in New Zealand.

In 1980, Marilyn and Stephanie Bonny collaborated again on Living with Fifty Architects: a New Zealand Perspective. The book focuses on homes architects designed for themselves, including Marilyn and Ian's residential property in Howick. The authors highlight that in designing for themselves, architects can ignore constraints of profit or opinion and design homes which speak to their own values. They note that architects flourish when designing their own homes, and that many spatial and technical innovations are borne here.

The thinking found in her writing, such as low cost housing and localised, personalised housing designs, align with the thinking of the 1940s Architectural Group. Other books Marilyn wrote and contributed to include Housing Choices for the Elderly (1981) Practical Planning for Retirement (1984), New Zealand Houses Today (1988) and Looking Ahead: Housing Choices for Retirement (1991). Her later in life focus on housing for the elderly saw her become involved in Abbeyfield, a housing trust providing affordable shared housing for the elderly.

== Recognition ==
In 2001, the Group received New Zealand Institute of Architect's (NZIA) Gold Medal, as recognition of their impact on New Zealand architecture. Within this, Marilyn was one of twelve people from the Group who received an individual medal and certificate from the NZIA.

In 2013, Marilyn was featured in Architecture + Women NZ Between Silos exhibition in Auckland. She is included in their ongoing and mobile Timeline exhibition.

== Personal life ==
At university, Marilyn met Ian Reynolds. Ian was an architecture student employed by her parents as a tutor. Ian moved to London, and in 1949 Marilyn left university and joined him.

Marilyn had six children: Mark, Amanda, Stephen, John, Jeremy, and Patrick. Her daughter, Amanda Reynolds, graduated with a degree in architecture from the University of Auckland in 1989. She works as an architect in the United Kingdom where she owns her own practice. Marilyn's son Patrick Reynolds is a well-known architectural photographer.
