= Architecture + Women NZ =

New Zealand professional organisation advocating for women in architecture

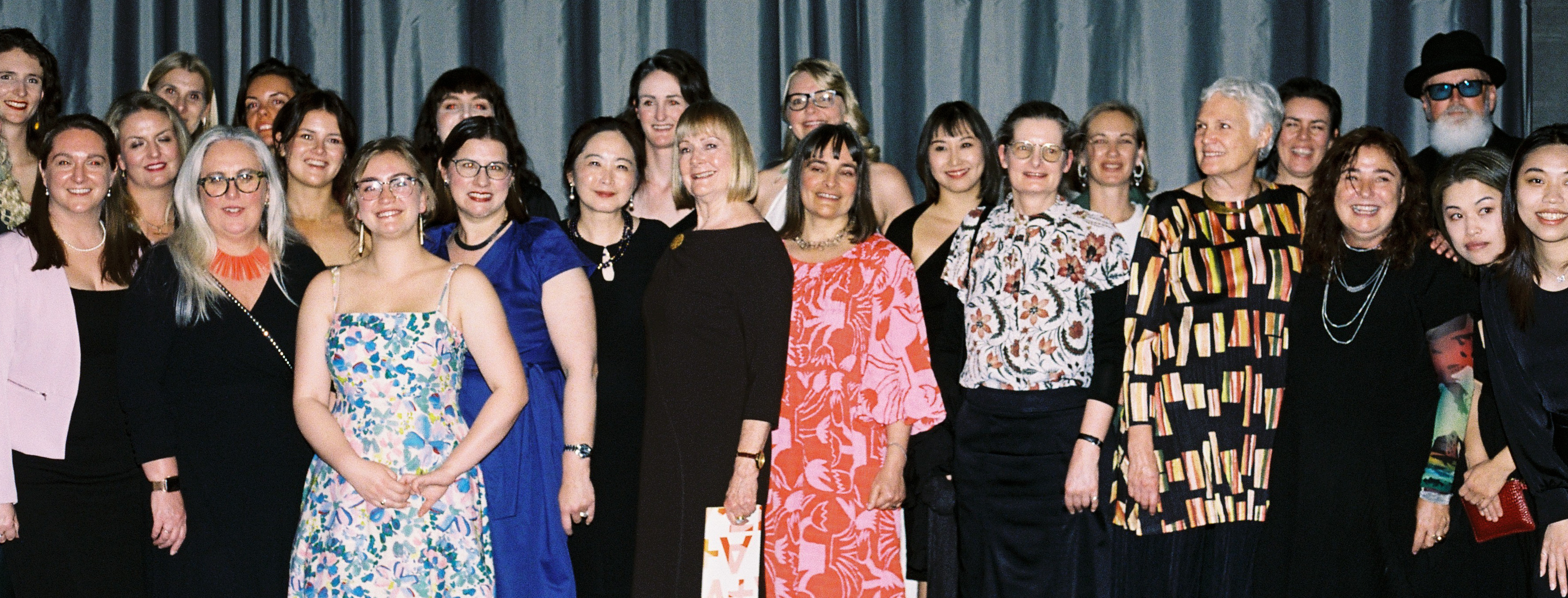
- A+W NZ Awards 2023
- Formation: 2011
- Website: architecturewomen.org.nz

Architecture + Women New Zealand (A+W NZ) is a membership-based professional organisation of women in architecture in New Zealand. The organisation promotes diversity, inclusion and equity in architecture through events, membership, advocacy and publication. The group also runs the tri-annual Architecture + Women NZ Dulux Awards.

== History ==
The organisation was founded in 2011 by Lynda Simmons, Sarah Treadwell, Julie Wilson and Megan Rule. Simmons and Wilson were motivated by the large number of women leaving the architecture profession in New Zealand.

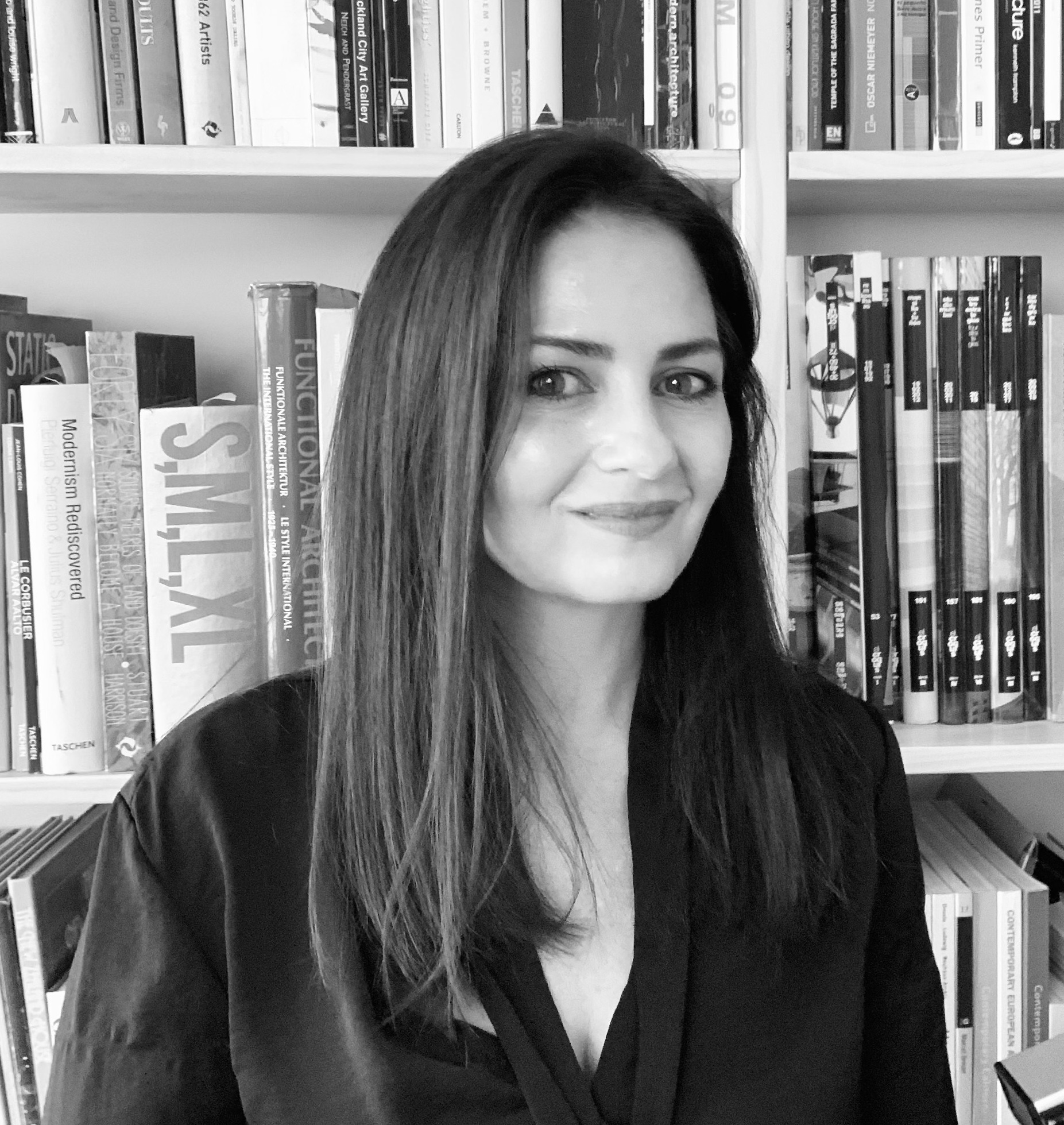
Julie Wilson

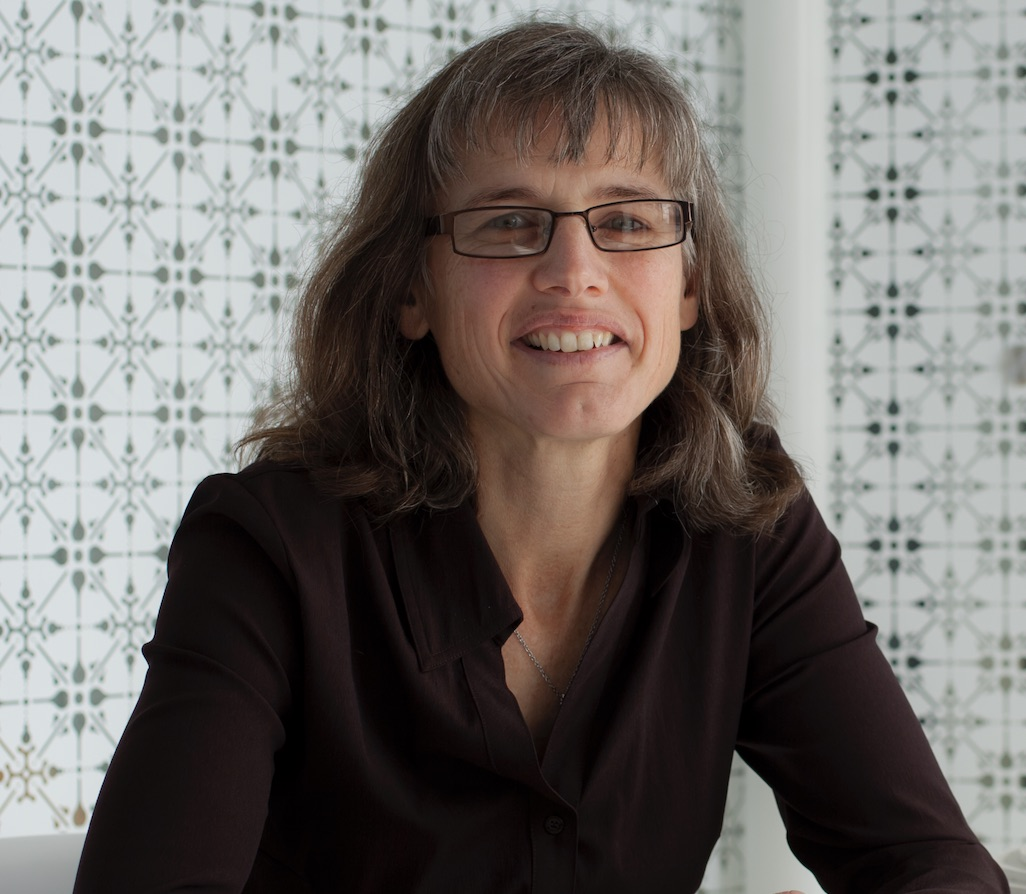
Megan Rule

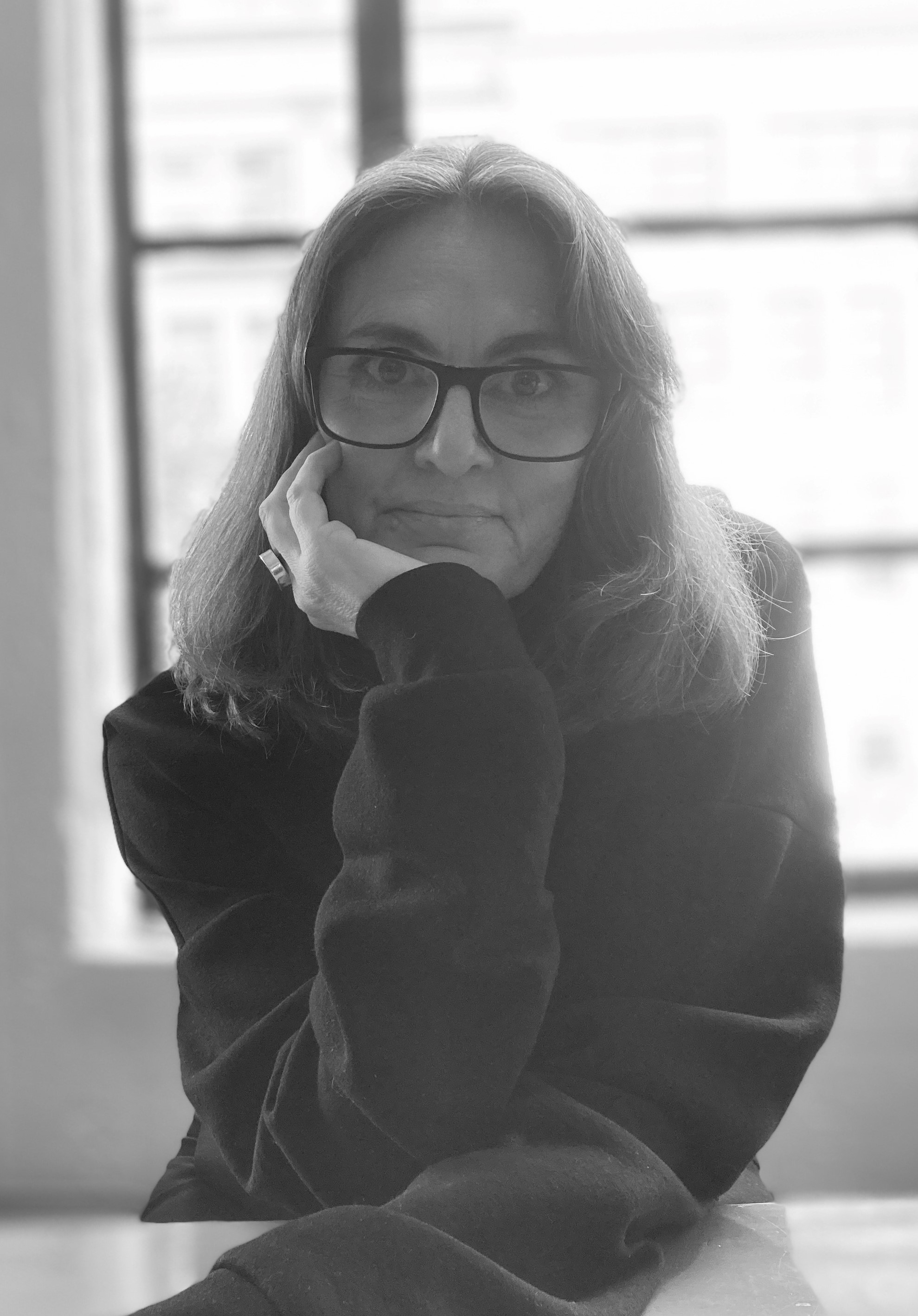
Lynda Simmons

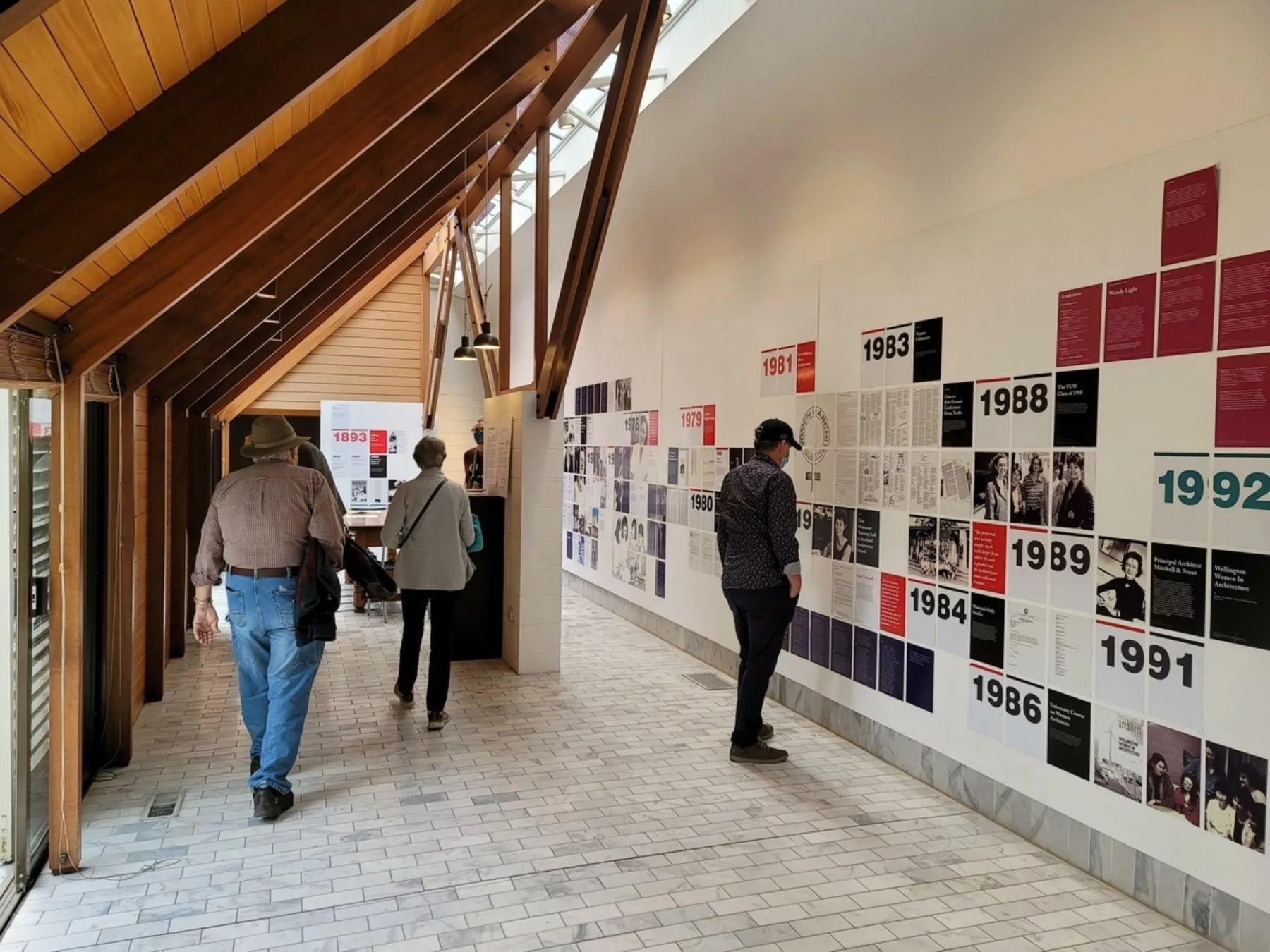
Photograph of the A+W NZ Timeline Exhibition, on display at Open Christchurch May 2022

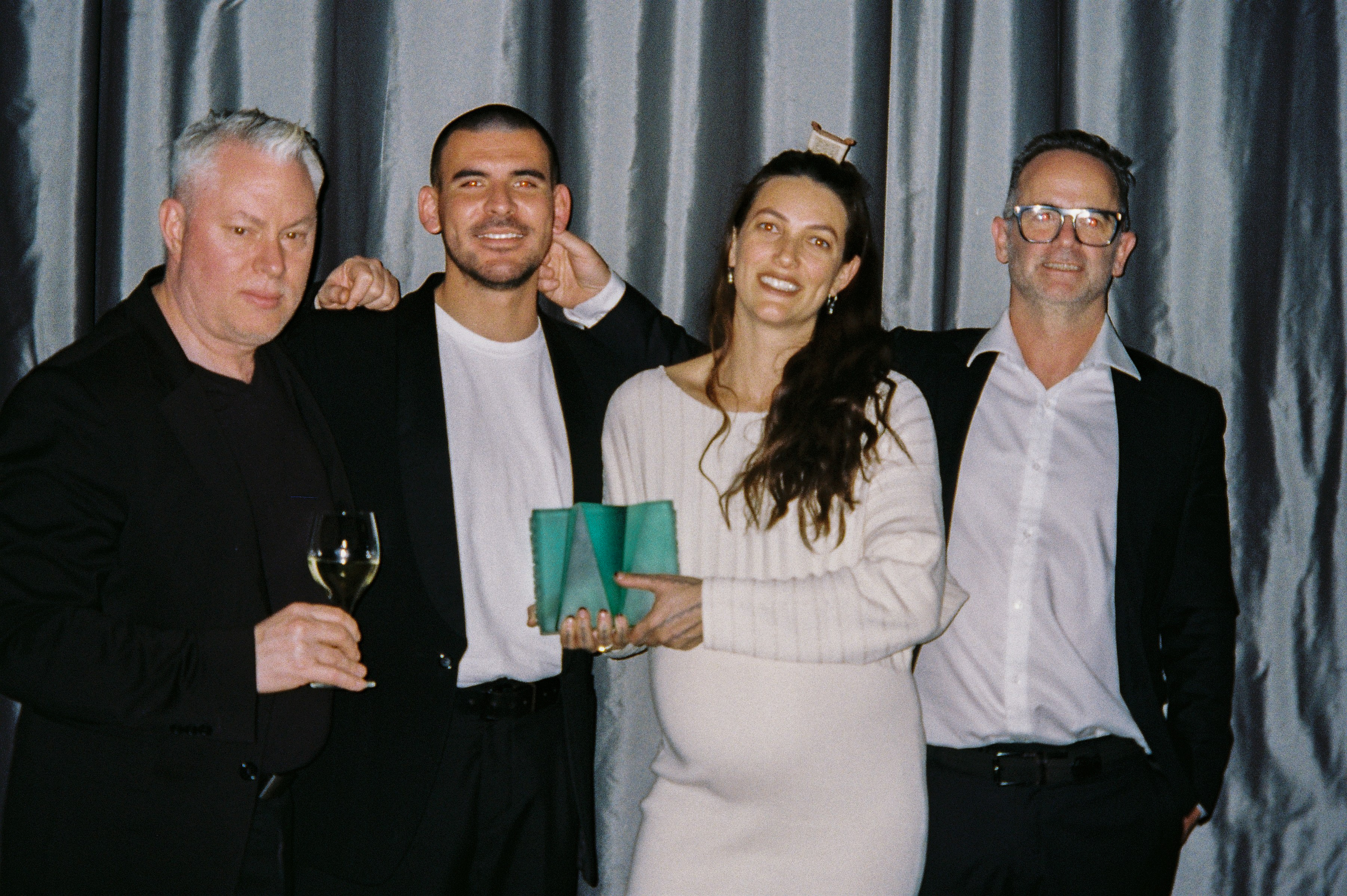
A+W NZ Dulux Awards 2023 winner Raukura Turei alongside colleagues from Monk Mackenzie

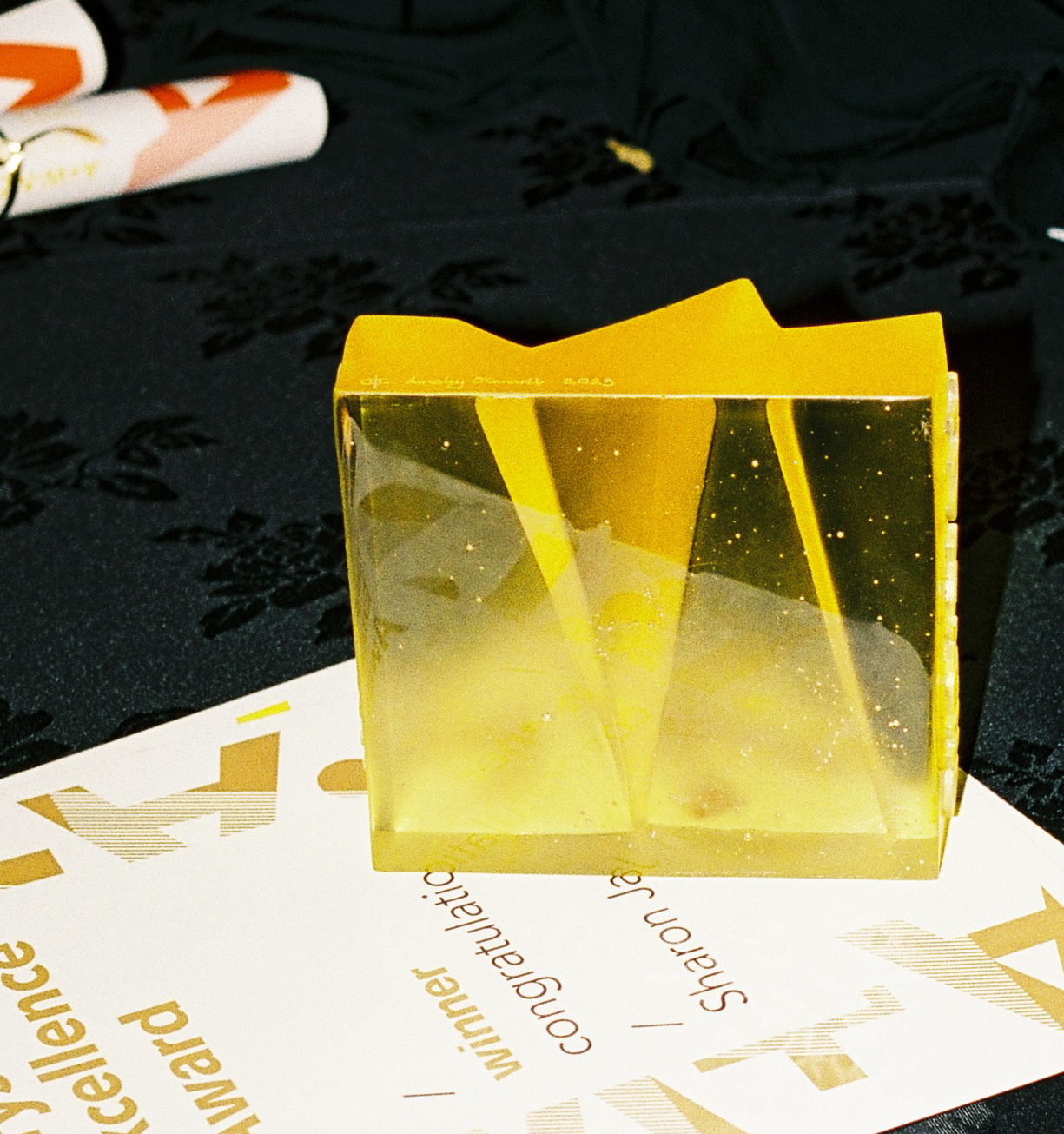
A+W NZ Dulux Awards trophy and publication

Their core aims are visibility for members and to increase inclusiveness in the architectural profession by highlighting and addressing barriers. It was one of the 'recent advocacy groups for gender equity' and at the start was a website and database to promote diversity, inclusion and equity in architecture. In 2013 Elisapeta Heta joined.

In 2013 the membership of A+W NZ was almost 1000 people. An awards programme was established in 2014 called the Architecture + Women NZ Dulux Awards.

== Activities ==
In 2013 A+W NZ created an exhibition called Between Silos that was inspired by an exhibition 20 years prior called Constructive Agenda – 60 Years of Women in Architecture in New Zealand. Between Silos was written by Marianne Calvelo, with design by Joy Roxas and curated by Lynda Simmons. The exhibition was also presented by Te Pūtahi Centre for Architecture and City Making in Christchurch as part of their Open Christchurch programme which is an initiative of architectural historian Jessica Halliday.

A+W NZ instigated the tri-annual awards, the Architecture + Women NZ Dulux Awards, with the first ones awarded in 2014. The awards are to recognise the contribution of women to the field of architecture in New Zealand. There are three categories, the Wirihana Leadership Award named after Moana Wirihana, the Munro Diversity Award named after Margaret Munro, and the Chrystall Excellence Award named after Lillian Chrystall.

Part of the work of the group is advocacy and this includes creating submissions to Parliament on relevant legislation. There is also a Tātuhi/Drawing Architecture: Sarah Treadwell Archive. Each year, a drawing is chosen by Sarah Treadwell and her nominated team to be archived. Drawings archived include work by Lusitania Vete, Matthew Boyuan Cao, Devyani Sethi, Jonathan Morrish and Mikaela King. Drawings from the archive were exhibited at the Refinery Artspace, Nelson, in 2022 along with a A+W NZ Timeline exhibition.

Work of A+W NZ includes regular newsletters to members and mentoring. The book Making Space: A History of New Zealand Women in Architecture edited by Elizabeth Cox was published in 2022 by Massey University Press in association with Architecture + Women NZ.

== Recognition ==
In 2015, the organisation received a highly commended award in the Helen Tippett Award category at the National Association of Women in Construction (New Zealand) Excellence Awards.

In 2022, Architecture + Women New Zealand was the inaugural winner of the 2022 John Sutherland Practice Award by Te Kāhui Whaihanga New Zealand Institute of Architects to acknowledge their 'profound contribution' and that by removing barriers within architecture they were benefiting the profession as a whole.
