= Australasian Student Architecture Congress =

Biennial student architecture congress in Australasia

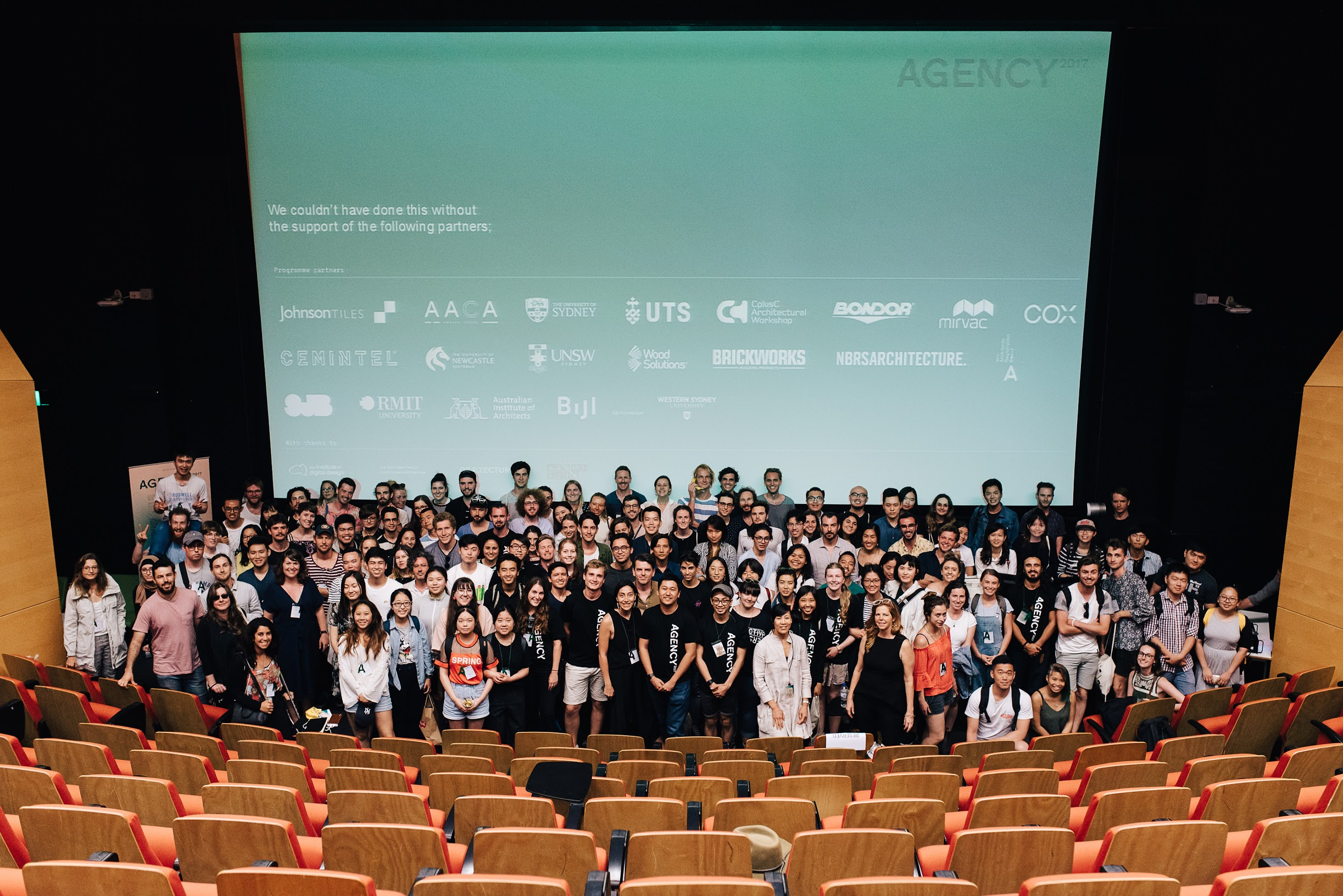
Agency, Sydney 2017

The Australasian Student Architecture Congress (ASAC) is a biennial meeting of architecture students from Australia, New Zealand, and Papua New Guinea. Established in 1963, the congress has influenced the development of architectural education and student activism in the region of Oceania.

== History ==
The first recognised congress took place in Auckland in 1963, where Dutch architect Aldo van Eyck spoke on the social aspects of housing. Origins of the movement can be traced to a 1960 meeting at the University of New South Wales titled The Quest for Ideals, which followed a 1959 event organised by Auckland students.

Around 1962 the Australasian Architectural Students Association (AASA) formed, and congresses in 1963–1971 addressed topics such as social housing (Auckland, 1963), low-cost housing (Sydney, 1964), and education (Perth, 1966). This period between 1963 and 1971 was especially active, with the gathering taking place every year in an Australian city, and book-ended by two congresses in New Zealand. Instrumental in these early congresses was the leadership of the AASA, then headed by Lecki Ord, who would go on to be the first woman lord mayor of Melbourne.

The 1971 Warkworth (Auckland) congress built a temporary “village” of student-designed structures and invited speakers including Serge Chermayeff and Sim van der Ryn. Described as “more like an experimental festival than a professional conference,” the event instigated curriculum change at the University of Auckland in 1972.

Despite the absence of a permanent governing body, the congress has drawn speakers such as Buckminster Fuller (1966 Perth, 1968 Hobart, 1970 Sydney), Team 10 members Jaap Bakema, Aldo van Eyck and John Voelcker (1966, Perth), Balkrishna Doshi (1969 Adelaide), Christopher Alexander (1970 Sydney), Roger Walker (1971 Auckland), Paolo Soleri and Peter Beaven (1983 Auckland), and Peter Stutchbury (1999 Sydney).

For the July 1983 congress titled Gone to Kiwi in Auckland, Gill Mathewson and Sarah Treadwell produced a series of presentation panels followed by an article with Women in Architecture. Gill was subsequently invited to run a women's only studio project at the University of Auckland school of Architecture, in an attempt to answer the question "do women design differently from men".

The congress has also seeded student organisations. The Student Organised Network for Architecture (SONA) was established after the 1997 Geelong congress, while the Student Architecture Network of New Zealand (SANNZ) formed following the 2007 Wellington congress. The 2011 Adelaide congress hosted the inaugural meeting of the International Network of Indigenous Architects.

== Themes and format ==
ASAC is organised by a local student committee and rotates between host cities every two years. Each congress adopts a theme that frames lectures, workshops, exhibitions, and site visits. Examples include:

- The Next Wave (1981 Canberra)
- Alchemy (1993 Adelaide)
- Nexus (2013 Newcastle)
- People (2015 Melbourne)
- Dissent (2019 Christchurch)
- Ground Matters (2024 Hobart)

== Ground Matters (2024) ==
The 2024 congress, Ground Matters, was hosted in Hobart (nipulana / Lutruwita) from 25–29 June 2024. The program examined connections between land, cultural narratives, and sustainability. Speakers included Michael Mossman, Kristiina Kuusiluoma and Martino De Rossi, Sarah Lynn Rees, and Eleena Jamil.

== Timeline of significant congresses ==
Year	Location	Theme	Notable speakers
1963	Auckland	Social Aspects of New Housing	Aldo van Eyck
1966	Perth	Educreation	Buckminster Fuller, Aldo van Eyck, Jacob Bakema, John Voelcker
1971	Auckland/Warkworth	Environment	Roger Walker, Serge Chermayeff, Sim van der Ryn, John Scott
1983	Auckland	Gone to Kiwi	Sarah Treadwell, Peter Beaven, Paolo Soleri, Sam Hunt, Marcel Marceau
1993	Adelaide	Alchemy	Bahram Shirdel, Richard Leplastrier
1999	Sydney	Flashpoint	Peter Stutchbury, Wolf Prix, Ken Yeang
2007	Wellington	CtrlShift	Peggy Deamer, David Mitchell, Andrew Maynard
2011	Adelaide	Flux	Ken Yeang, Nathaniel Corum
2017	Sydney	Agency	Jeremy Till, Yoshiharu Tsukamoto, Julie Eizenberg
2024	Hobart	Ground Matters	Sarah Lynn Rees, Eleena Jamil, Matt Hinds

== Legacy ==
The congress has continued for more than sixty years without a permanent governing body, with each congress organised by a new group of students. Early congresses have been described as important moments in student-led experimentation and debate around architectural education. The 1966 Perth event titled Educreation constructed geodesic domes and tested alternative approaches to architectural education. Staged at the same time that year as the RAIA convention, there was significant cross over of attendees to the student organised event, due to the notability of its invited speakers. The 1971 Warkworth event has been characterised as a catalyst for student activism in New Zealand, and a number of early congresses as providing “a forum for questioning architectural orthodoxy.”
