= Vanessa Carswell =

New Zealand architect

Vanessa Karen Carswell
- Education: Unitec Institute of Technology
- Occupation: Architect
- Children: 2
- Practice: Warren and Mahoney, Grimshaw Architects, Allies and Morrison, Jasmax
- Buildings: Pita Te Hori/King Edward Barracks

Vanessa Karen Carswell is a New Zealand architect. In 2016 she won the National Association of Women in Construction Outstanding Achievement in Design Award for her work on the restoration of Christchurch's Isaac Theatre Royal.

== Biography ==
Carswell studied architecture at Unitec Institute of Technology in Auckland. In 2001, she joined architecture firm Warren and Mahoney and worked there for two years until moving to the United Kingdom. There she worked at Grimshaw Architects and Allies and Morrison, on heritage architecture such as the regeneration of King's Cross in London and The Core building, part of the Eden Project.

In 2009, Carswell returned to New Zealand and rejoined Warren and Mahoney. From 2011 to 2015 she led the restoration of the Isaac Theatre Royal. Carswell was also principal architect on projects for Ngāi Tahu’s Pita Te Hori/King Edward Barracks, a mixed-use inner-city development in Christchurch.

In September 2020, Carswell was appointed a principal architect at Jasmax and co-lead of the company's Christchurch studio.
