= Wellington Architectural Centre =

Architecture organisation in Wellington, New Zealand

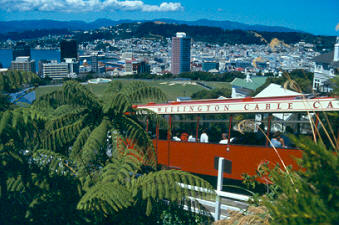

The Architectural Centre Inc is a nonprofit organization in Wellington, New Zealand, for architects and laypeople with an interest in architecture which offers lectures, site visits, tours and exhibitions.

== History of the centre ==
The centre was established in 1946 in Wellington, New Zealand. It ran the first architectural school in Wellington (1946–1956), and the first town planning school in New Zealand (1949–1956). It also ran the Centre Gallery (1953–1968), an early venue for exhibiting modern art, and published Design Review (1948–1954) – one of the first design-oriented journals in New Zealand.

The centre has also held many exhibitions, including:

- Te Aro Replanned (1947/48)
- Vertical Living/ Living in Cities (1954)
- 196X (1960)
- Harbour Front (1971)
- Unbuilt Wellington (1987)
- Home made Home (1991)
- Reclaiming (Northern Gateway Exhibition) (1999)
- Manifesto exhibition (2006)

It has lobbied the Wellington City Council about issues to do with Wellington's built environment and run competitions, such as the annual 20under40 24 hour ideas competition, which began in 1990. More recently, the Architectural Centre published an architectural manifesto (2006), and has been a partner in the organisation of Wellington Architecture Week.

Past and present members of the Architectural Centre include:

- Bill Alington (1929-2024)
- Ian Athfield (1940–2015)
- James Albert Beard (1924–2017)
- Sandy Beach
- Jock Beere (1913–2001)
- Guy Cleverley
- John Watson Cox (1902–1984)
- Deb Cranko
- Ken Davis
- Helmut Einhorn (1911–1988)
- Charles Fearnley (1915–1988)
- Al Gabites
- Julia Gatley
- Kate Linzey
- Christina Mackay
- Guy Marriage
- Lew Martin (1920–2013)
- Christine McCarthy
- Stephen McDougall
- Simon Mclellan
- Alan Minty
- Gordon Moller
- Geoff Nees (1923–1999)
- Tim Nees
- Fred Newman (1900–1964)
- Stuart Niven
- Gerald Parsonson
- Maurice Patience (1915–1986)
- Ernst Plischke (1903–1992)
- George Porter (1921–1998)
- Ian Reynolds (1922–2005)
- Bill Sutch (1907–1975)
- Bill Toomath (1925–2014)
- Anthony Treadwell (1922–2003)
- Paul Walker (born 1958)
- Roger Walker (born 1942)
- Simon Wilberforce
- Allan Wild (1927–2019)
- Derek Wilson (1922–2016)
- Keith Wilson

== Membership ==
Membership is about 150, and a regular newsletter is published.

== See also ==
- SAHANZ Society of Architectural Historians
- Auckland Architecture Association or weblink
- The Architecture Centre Network
- Heritage New Zealand or weblink
