= Anna-Marie Chin =

New Zealand architect

- Occupation: Architect
- Awards: Te Kāhui Whaihanga New Zealand Institute of Architects Southern Awards

Anna-Marie Chin is a New Zealand registered architect based in Arrowtown. She has won several awards for her architecture.

== Biography ==
Chin grew up in Otago and Southland, and had family holidays in Arrowtown and Central Otago, which she says influenced her decision to study architecture. She runs her own practice, Anna-Marie Chin Architects, in Arrowtown.

In 2016, a home designed by Chin won Best Small Home. In 2022, the same home won the Home of the Year Award.

In the 2019 Te Kāhui Whaihanga New Zealand Institute of Architects Southern Awards, Chin's firm won two awards: in the Housing – Alterations and Additions category and the Commercial Architecture category. In the same awards in 2021, her firm won an award in the Housing category. In the 2023 awards, Chin's firm won twice: in the Housing category and the Housing – Alterations & Additions category. Chin was a finalist in the Architecture + Women NZ Chrystall Excellence Award, which acknowledged her exploration on the relationship of a site's materiality and geology in her architecture.

In 2021, Chin was the featured architect in an episode of series one of the six-part television documentary series Designing Dreams presented by Matthew Ridge on Prime Television.

Chin's design of the Alexandra Rock House won the Southern region NZIA Housing Award in 2024 with the judges commenting, "...a beautiful interplay of levels suspended above the rock".
