= Derek Wilson (architect) =

New Zealand architect and environmentalist

- Born: Derek John Wilson; 4 July 1922; New Zealand
- Died: 10 June 2016 (aged 93); Wellington, New Zealand
- Occupation: Architect
- Spouse: Diana June Townsend
- Children: 3 sons
- Buildings: Calvert House; Maunsell Beach House; Wilson House; Marine Research Facilities

Derek John Wilson (4 July 1922 – 10 June 2016) was a New Zealand architect. He was active in Wellington. He was also known as an environmentalist, and published several works.

== Early life ==
Wilson grew up on a coastal sheep station owned by the Riddiford family at Tora, Wairarapa, where his father Clement Henry Wilson was the manager. His mother was Ida Agnes Wilson (née Clarkson). Wilson was the oldest of three children: his sister Joan and his brother Godfrey, who became an Anglican bishop.

Wilson was educated at Wanganui Collegiate School. During World War II, he trained as a pilot in Florida for the Fleet Air Arm.

== Architectural practice ==
Wilson trained as an architect at Auckland University College.

After graduating, Wilson left New Zealand and worked in London for Ramsey, Murray, White and Ward (the firm of two New Zealand ex-pats Keith Murray and Basil Ward), as well as for Sir Hugh Casson and the London County Council.

Returning to New Zealand, he settled in Masterton and then moved to Wellington to join forces with William Toomath to set up Toomath and Wilson. Toomath and Wilson were later joined by Don Irvine and Grahame Anderson in 1972, forming the firm Toomath Wilson Irvine Anderson Ltd.

Wilson's design for the Calvert House, in Stokes Valley, was awarded an NZIA Bronze medal. Other work of note includes the Maunsell beach-house at Riversdale Beach, the Wilson house in Khandallah, St Matthew's Church in Brooklyn, Wellington, and his Marine Research Facilities at Wellington's Greta Point (now NIWA) (1980). All are well known as important works in Wellington's architectural history.

He was a member of the Wellington Architectural Centre, including as President (1963) and Committee Member (1961–62, 1964).

A recent book, "Four Architects", celebrates Wellington architecture and includes several of Wilson's designs.

== Environmental and peace advocacy ==
Wilson was also an active advocate for environmental and anti-nuclear issues, and published on both topics.

In 1984, Wilson became the founding co-ordinator of Architects Against Nuclear Arms and was also a member of the Pacific Institute of Resource Management and the National Consultative Committee on Disarmament and Abolition.

Perhaps his most significant published work in this area is a 2001 book titled "Five Holocausts".

== Personal life ==
Wilson was married to Diana June Townsend. They had three sons and six grandchildren. One of his sons, Martin James Wilson (1959–2022), was an environmentalist, musician and festival organiser.

Wilson died in Wellington on 10 June 2016.

== Other sources ==
- "Calvert house, Stokes Valley, Bronze Medal" NZIAJ (November 1969) v. 36, n.11, pp. 334–337.
- "Calvert house, Stokes Valley, Merit Award" NZIAJ (May 1969), v. 36. n. 5, p. 151.
- Clark, Justine and Paul Walker Looking for the Local (Wellington: Victoria University Press, 2000) pp. 37, 65, 71, 182-183.
- Murphy, Lyn "Book recalls old Golden Mile" Evening Post (4 July 1989) p. 3.
- Overcoming violence in Aotearoa New Zealand: a contribution to the World Council of Churches Decade to Overcome Violence 2001-2010 (Wellington, N.Z.: Philip Garside Pub., c2002)
- Packer, Ann "The test of time" Dominion Post (25 Jan 2003) § F, p. 16.
- Wilson, Derek A cry from the heart: people-centred sustainable development versus the unsustainable growth paradigm (Wellington, N.Z.: Pacific Institute of Resource Management, c1994)
- Wilson, Derek Five holocausts (Wellington, N.Z.: Steele Roberts, c2001)
- Wilson, Derek Neither confirm nor deny: an examination of the policy of neither confirming nor denying the presence of nuclear weapons on any military station, ship, vehicle or aircraft, or whether any ship is nuclear powered (Wellington, N.Z.: Pacific Institute of Resource Management, 1991)
