= Lynda Simmons =

New Zealand architect and academic

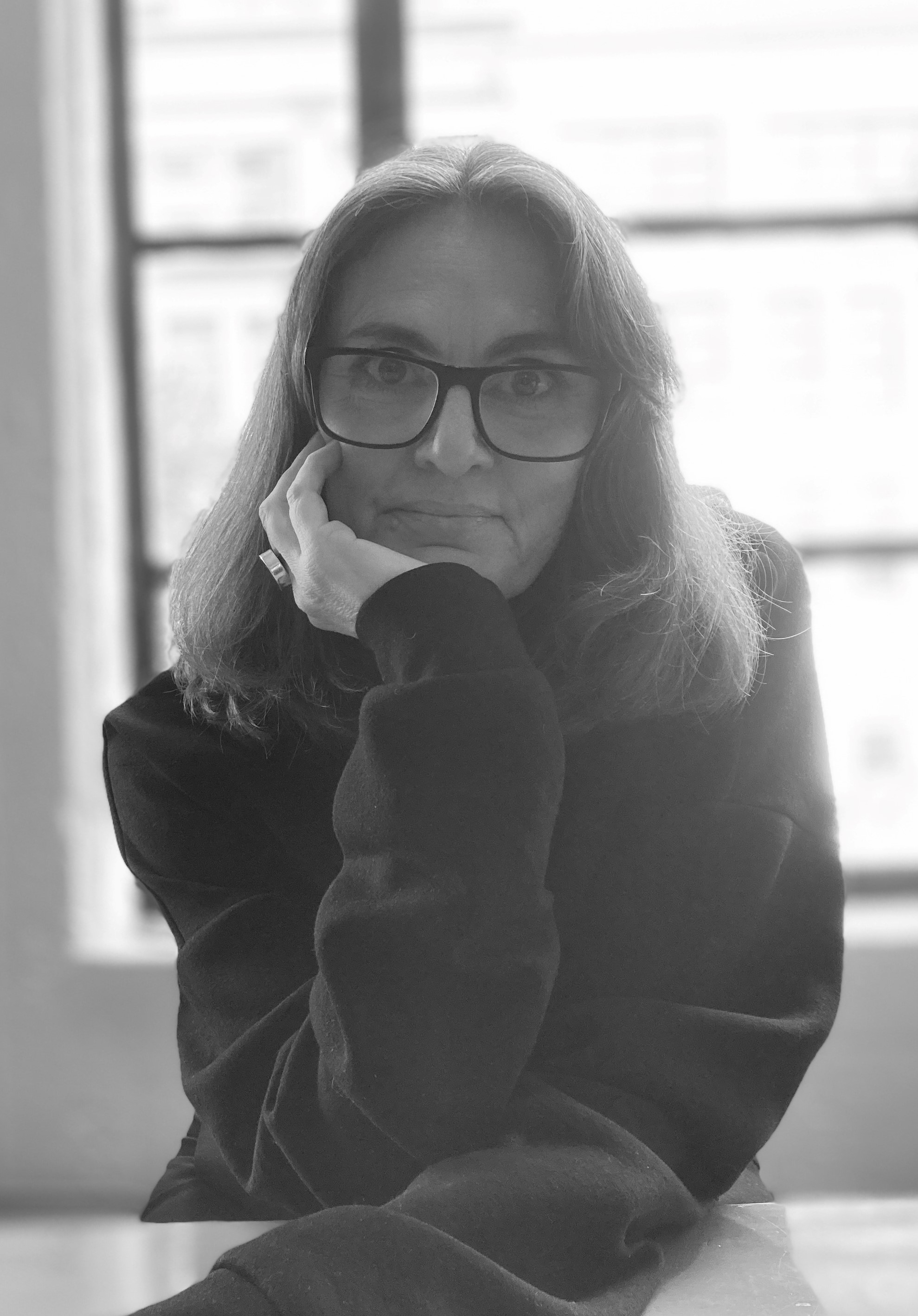
- Simmons in 2022

Academic background
- Education: University of Auckland
- Thesis: From man alone to larrikin: The work of Neil Simmons 1958–1984 (2011)
- Academic advisor: Sarah Treadwell

Lynda Simmons is a New Zealand architect and academic, and is a professional teaching fellow at the University of Auckland. Simmons was a co-founder of the Architecture + Women NZ association. Simmons's research focuses on design processes in art practices, and the uncovering of "invisible histories" in the New Zealand architectural community. She was made a fellow of the New Zealand Institute of Architects in 2013, and was awarded a President's Award in 2014 for her advocacy work.

== Career ==
Simmons graduated from the University of Auckland with a Bachelor in Architecture in 1987. She worked for the family practice Neil Simmons Architects from 1987 to 1990 and again from 1993 to 1996, becoming a registered architect in 1989. From 1990 to 1993 she worked overseas in London and Vancouver. Simmons opened a sole practice in 1997, while also teaching at Unitec. She describes being determined not to reduce her teaching or practice hours when she had children, but instead worked at home at night, and taught carrying a baby in a frontpack. She has observed that many women find it necessary to leave large practices and work in sole practice from home in order to raise a family. Only when their children are older are they able to rejoin and be promoted in the larger firms. Of her choice to work in sole practice while raising her children, Simmons said:

"It was a choice of [career] survival. And I look at so many young women who are doing really well in large practices or medium-sized practices, and the expectation that they have to suddenly set up from the kitchen table for 10 years, and then go back and get the job that they deserve – that appalls me."

Simmons completed a master's degree in architectural history through the University of Auckland in 2012, with a thesis on her father titled From man alone to larrikin: the work of Neil Simmons 1958–1984. She is a professional teaching fellow at the University of Auckland. Her research focuses on design processes in art practices, the interaction of architecture and sociology, and the uncovering of "invisible histories" in the New Zealand architectural community.

== Equity in architecture ==
Simmons estimates that over her 25 year plus teaching career she has taught more than 1000 women. Prompted by high numbers of women leaving the profession, Simmons started a push for equity within the architectural community on 2011 by co-founding the Architecture + Women NZ association. Her co-founders were Sarah Treadwell, Julie Wilson and Megan Rule. The organisation, which has more than 1000 members, created an exhibition in 2013, Between Silos, which toured four cities and included a one-day symposium.

Simmons stepped down as co-chair of the organisation in 2019, but is still involved as research and policy leader and archivist.

== Honours and awards ==
Simmons was made a fellow of the New Zealand Institute of Architects in 2013. She received a President's Award from the institute in 2014. The award acknowledged her contribution to "events and initiatives examining the current situation of women in New Zealand architecture. The programme, together with the Architecture + Women database and website, with which Lynda has also been closely involved, has raised the professional profile of women architects and fostered collegial relationships among them, and ensured that gender issues in New Zealand architecture are given consideration."

Other awards:

- 2016 NZIA National Award (Small Project category), and 2016 NZIA Local Award (Small Project category), for Studio and Garden Room–Peters House in Pakuranga. The judges said it "reimagines the traditionally sterile relationship in Auckland suburbia of house, front yard and street".
- 2005 NZIA Local Award (Residential category)
- 2004 NZIA Regional Award (Heritage category)

== Selected works ==
- Simmons, Lynda (July 2019). "Opinion: The issue of unpaid hours". Architecture NZ (4): 16–17 – via Architecture Now.
- Simmons, Lynda (2011). "Interior Darkness / Contained Shadow". Interstices. 12: 126–130. ISSN 1170-585X.
- Simmons, Lynda (May 2022). "Obituary: Lillian Chrystall (1926–2022)". Architecture NZ (3) – via Architecture Now.
