= Hedda Oosterhoff =

Set designer, architect and sound advisor

Hedda Maria Oosterhoff is an interior acoustic designer working in theatre, opera, schools and commercial settings; she was born in Holland and lives and works in New Zealand.

== Biography ==
Oosterhoff was born in Holland. Her family moved to New Zealand when she was nine years old, settling in Wellington. She started learning the violin at the age of 5, and played in chamber orchestras, bands, orchestras for operas and musicals, and co-founded a string group called Rosa Musica. She studied at Victoria University of Wellington, graduating in 2004 with a Bachelor of Music in Performance Violin and in 2008 with a Bachelor of Architecture (Honours).

While working for T&R Interior Systems, Oosterhoff led a team working on interior surfaces for Tūranga in Christchurch. She has also worked with New Zealand Opera on set design.

Oosterhoff is credited with initiating and leading the development of a new building product, Vertibrace, which separates a partition wall from the main wall of a structure, allowing movement in high winds or earthquakes.

=== Awards and recognition ===
In 2009, she received the Peter Lees-Jeffries Memorial Scholarship from the Dame Malvina Major Foundation. In 2010, she received the Pettman Dare International Performance Scholarship to work at Opera North and receive mentoring in opera design and management at the University of Leeds.

In 2019, she won the Outstanding Achievement in Design Award at the National Association of Women in Construction (New Zealand) Excellence Awards.
