= Deborah Cranko =

New Zealand architect

- Education: Victoria University of Wellington
- Occupation: Architect
- Awards: Professional Woman of the Year Award
- Practice: Cranko Architects

Deborah Cranko is a New Zealand architect. She is a recipient of 2015 National Association of Women in Construction Excellence Award.

== Biography ==
Cranko studied architecture at Victoria University of Wellington in the 1970s. After graduating she worked at KRTA, King and Dawson and other firms in Wellington until she founded her own architecture practice, Cranko Architects, in 1987.

In 1993, Cranko was one of a group of women architects in Wellington who created the exhibition Constructive Agenda: 60 years of women in architecture in New Zealand to mark 60 years since Merle Greenwood graduated with a bachelor architecture degree.

Cranko has served as deputy chair of the New Zealand Registered Architects Board, and represented the New Zealand Institute of Architects at the initial Building Standards Authority.

=== Awards and recognition ===
In 2015, Cranko won the Professional Woman of the Year Award at the National Association of Women in Construction (New Zealand) Excellence Awards. She is also a life member of the National Association of Women in Construction (New Zealand) and a fellow of the New Zealand Institute of Architects.

In 2020, Cranko was a finalist for the Chrystall Excellence Award at the Architecture + Women NZ Dulux Awards.
