= National Association of Women in Construction (New Zealand) Excellence Awards =

The National Association of Women in Construction (New Zealand) Excellence Awards is an annual set of awards which recognise the achievements of women working in construction and affiliated industries in New Zealand, as well as recognising organisations active in redressing the industry's gender imbalance. The inaugural awards were made in 2015, and have been made every year since with the exception of 2020. The National Association of Women in Construction (New Zealand) is the organising body for the awards.

== Categories ==
The awards were originally made in 6 categories. In 2023, the category "Outstanding Achievement in Design" will not be awarded; awards will be made in 8 categories, with up to 11 winners.

- Helen Tippett Award: named after Helen Tippett, a lecturer at Victoria University of Wellington's School of Architecture. The award celebrates achievements in advancing and furthering the interests of women in the construction industry. It is open to any organisation, company, partnership, firm, or individual operating in New Zealand.
- Tradeswoman of the Year: celebrates the contributions made by tradeswomen working in the construction industry. It is open to all tradeswomen working in the construction industry in New Zealand
- Outstanding Leader of the Year - Site or Office Based: this was a new category in 2022 and replaced "Professional Woman of the Year". It is open to women who have demonstrated outstanding leadership in a management or supervisory role or who own and run their own business in the industry.
- Rising Star - Site or Office Based: this category was first awarded in 2017. It is open to women who have worked in the construction industry for no more than 7 years
- Excellence in Construction Administration - Site or Office Based: celebrates the contributions of women in an administrative, sales/marketing, or operational role within the construction industry
- Health, Safety, Wellbeing, and Environment Award: this is a new category for 2023. It recognises a woman who actively promotes the inclusion of health, safety, wellbeing, and environmental risk management practices, initiatives, or innovations on a project or across an organisation
- Student Excellence Award: this category was previously named "Student of the Year". It celebrates female students who demonstrate a high level of potential and commitment within the construction industry.
- Apprentice Excellence Award: this category was previously named "Apprentice of the Year". It celebrates female apprentices who demonstrate a high level of potential and commitment within the construction industry.

== Award ceremonies and recipients ==
=== 2023 ===
The 2023 awards attracted 238 nominations and a group of 37 judges and 5 moderators decided on the finalists and winners. The ceremony was held on 21 July in Christchurch at Te Pae. Construction company Naylor Love was the major sponsor for the event. The Outstanding Achievement in Design award was not awarded and a new award was introduced: Achievement in Health, Safety, Wellbeing and Environment.

Award	Recipient and Employer	Notes
Helen Tippett Award	Aurelie Le Gall, Fletcher Living	
Tradeswoman of the Year	Ella Star, Plumberella Billie McDonnell, South Auckland Plumbing	
Outstanding Leader of the Year - Site Based	Nicky Leman, Fletcher Construction	
Outstanding Leader of the Year - Office Based	Aleshia Perry, Link Alliance (WSP)	
Rising Star - Office Based	Eliza Cowey, AECOM	
Rising Star - Site Based	Bayley Smith, Fletcher Construction	
Excellence in Construction Administration - Office Based	Rowena Massey, PlaceMakers	
Excellence in Construction Administration - Site Based	Tui Simon, Fulton Hogan	
Student Excellence Award	Olivia Kieser, Downer NZ	
Apprentice Excellence Award	Nicola Ross, Nicola Ross Design	
Achievement in Health, Safety, Wellbeing and Environment Award	Kate Perrott, Fulton Hogan	

=== 2022 ===
The 2022 awards attracted 190 nominations and a group of 40 judges determined the finalists and winners. The ceremony was held on 1 July in Wellington at Te Papa. Construction company Naylor Love was the major sponsor for the event.

Award	Recipient and Employer	Notes
Helen Tippett Award	Becky Cox, Fulton Hogan	
Tradeswoman of the Year	Nikita Porthouse, Hutt Gas and Plumbing	
Outstanding Leader of the Year - Site Based	Fiona Jerry, Pipeline and Civil	
Outstanding Leader of the Year - Office Based	Linda Kestle, Unitec	
Rising Star - Office Based	Nalini Gounder, BECA	
Rising Star - Site Based	'Ofa-Ki-Mapalei Halatanu, Brian Perry Civil	
Excellence in Construction Administration - Office Based	Sali Mann, Fulton Hogan	
Excellence in Construction Administration - Site Based	Danielle Matika, Fulton Hogan	
Outstanding Achievement in Design	Clare Dring, Fulton Hogan	
Student Excellence Award	Caitlin Sanford, Massey University	
Apprentice Excellence Award	Kat Ricketts, J Grae Building	

=== 2021 ===
The 2021 awards were sponsored by BCITO (Building and Construction Industry Training Organisation). The ceremony included a keynote speech from the Minister of Building and Construction, Poto Williams.

Award	Recipient and Employer	Notes
Helen Tippett Award	Anita Varga, Fulton Hogan	
Tradeswoman of the Year	Tegan Williams, Alan Trow Painters	
Professional Woman of the Year - Site Based	Helen Russell, Brian Perry Civil	
Professional Woman of the Year - Office Based	Kelly Churchill, Fulton Hogan	
Rising Star - Office Based	Evie Wallace, BECA and Rochelle Kirby, WSP	
Rising Star - Site Based	Tevunga (Vee) Ungo'unga, Piritahi Alliance	
Excellence in Construction Administration	Kim Booker, Brosnan Construction	
Outstanding Achievement in Design	Kat Salm, Harrison Grierson	
Student or Apprentice Excellence Award	Chelsea Roper, Queenstown Carpenters	

=== 2019 ===
The 2019 awards were sponsored by BCITO (Building and Construction Industry Training Organisation). The ceremony was held on 27 September at the Royal Yacht Squadron in Auckland.

Award	Recipient and Employer	Notes
Helen Tippett Award	Colleen Upton, Hutt Gas & Plumbing	
Tradeswoman of the Year	Elizabeth Watson, Stone Roofing Ltd	
Professional Woman of the Year	Erin Black, BECA and Kathryn Kitchen, Fisher Aluminium	
Rising Star - Office Based	Lisa Mace, BECA and Neha Sharma, Jacobs Ltd	
Rising Star - Site Based	Morgan Raby, HEB Structures	
Excellence in Construction Administration	Tracy Shaw, Higgins Contractors and Kylie Wech, Downer	
Outstanding Achievement in Design	Hedda Oosterhoff, T&R Interior Systems	
Apprentice of the Year	Corinna Bohny, Contract Construction	
Student of the Year	Danielle Platt, Rider Levett Bucknall and Anna Winskill-Moore, Osborn Brothers Construction	

=== 2018 ===
The 2018 awards were sponsored by Hays, a recruitment company. The ceremony was held on 17 August at the Auckland Town Hall.

Award	Recipient and Employer	Notes
Helen Tippett Award	Gabrielle Bush, CPB Contractors	
Tradeswoman of the Year	Pip Buunk, Fulton Hogan	
Professional Woman of the Year	Heidi Johnston, Windowmakers	
Rising Star - Office Based	Elisapeta Heta, Jasmax	
Rising Star - Site Based	Amelia Gilbert-Milne, Brian Perry Civil and Jemma Dutton, CPB Contractors	
Excellence in Construction Administration	Emlyn Moore, Fletcher Construction	
Outstanding Achievement in Design	Stephanie Thompson, Stantec	
Apprentice of the Year	Jessica Curtis, Integrated Systems Design	

=== 2017 ===
The 2017 awards were sponsored by Hays, a recruitment company. The ceremony was held on 10 August at the Aotea Centre in Auckland.

Award	Recipient and Employer	Notes
Helen Tippett Award	Laura Clifford, Hawkins Construction	
Tradeswoman of the Year	Verena Maeder, Solid Earth	
Professional Woman of the Year	Rachael Rush, Klein	
Rising Star	Steph McLeod, Stantec NZ and Vikki Stephens, BECA	
Excellence in Construction Services	Sophie Lackey, Leighs Construction	
Outstanding Achievement in Design	Sian France, BECA	
Apprentice and Student (Professional)	Gillian Linton, Arvida	
Apprentice and Student (Trades)	Emily Sutton, City Care	

=== 2016 ===
The 2016 awards were sponsored by Hays, a recruitment company. The ceremony was held on 15 September at Mac's Function Centre in Wellington.

Award	Recipient and Employer	Notes
Helen Tippett Award	Megan Rule, South Pacific Architecture	
Tradeswoman of the Year	Carmen Sutton, McIntosh Builders	
Professional Woman of the Year (Construction)	Lynne Makepeace, Fletcher Construction	
Professional Woman of the Year (Professional)	Karen Sanderson, BECA	
Excellence in Construction Administration	Carolyn Pitman, Fletcher Construction	
Outstanding Achievement in Design	Vanessa Carswell, Warren and Mahoney and Gemma Collins, Fletcher Construction	
Apprentice and Student (Professional)	Vanessa Coxhead, Victoria University	
Apprentice and Student (Trades)	Natalie Thornton, City Decorators	

=== 2015 ===
The 2015 awards were sponsored by Hays, a recruitment company. The winners were announced on 15 May in Christchurch.

Award	Recipient and Employer	Notes
Helen Tippett Award	SCIRT Women in Construction, SCIRT	
Tradeswoman of the Year	Mary Clare Bartlett, Tickled Pink	
Professional Woman of the Year	Deborah Cranko, Cranko Architects	
Excellence in Construction Administration	Kristina Wyschnowsky, Corbel Construction	
Outstanding Achievement in Design	Lianne Cox, Studio Pacific Architecture and Sarah Neill, BECA	
Student or Apprentice Excellence	Gail Roysten, BECA	

== See also ==
- List of awards honoring women
