= Kat Salm =

New Zealand geospatial scientist

Kathryn (Kat) Salm is a New Zealand geospatial scientist. She is a recipient of 2021 National Association of Women in Construction Excellence Awards.

== Biography ==
Salm completed a Bachelor of Science (Honours) degree in environmental science, followed by a PhD in science, at the University of Canterbury, Christchurch.

In 2019, Salm was appointed president of Survey and Spatial New Zealand.

=== Awards and recognition ===
In 2018, Salm won a Women's Leadership Award at the New Zealand Spatial Excellence Awards, and the same award at the Asia Pacific Spatial Excellence Awards. In 2021, Salm received the Outstanding Achievement in Design Award at the National Association of Women in Construction (New Zealand) Excellence Awards.
