= Megan Edwards (architect) =

New Zealand architect

- Occupation: Architect
- Alma mater: University of Auckland
- Nationality: New Zealand

Megan Edwards is a New Zealand architect residing in West Auckland. She is known for her residential projects.

== Biography ==
Edwards was raised in New Zealand. Her father was an engineer who worked closely with architects, exposing her to plans and construction early in her life. Edwards' family owned a pole house style bach, designed by Kerry Avery.

Edwards graduated from the University of Auckland in 1998. After graduating, she worked at ASC Architects (then called Andrews Scott Hill) for 18 months before moving to London. Edwards gained her registration during her seven years working overseas. When she returned to Auckland she worked briefly for Richard Priest Architects before starting her own practice.

She resides and works in Green Bay, Auckland.

Edwards sat on the jury for the 2016 New Zealand Architecture Awards.

== Career ==
Megan Edwards formed Megan Edward Architects in 1994, a practice specialising in residential renovations and new builds. She works with fellow architects Allen Eng and Jacqueline Bel in her own designed home studio based in West Auckland. The practice was previously based in a house designed by Tibor Donner for the Henry Atkinson Family in 1945-46.

Edwards first gained recognition for a Bungalow renovation in Point Chevalier. The building utilises a lower floor level and a raised ceiling, in combination with the existing California-style shallow gable. This in combination created a chapel-like space in the home. The bungalow renovation was awarded the NZIA Auckland Architecture Award for Alternations and Additions in 2015.

Edwards' work includes The Knoll, a hillside house in Greenhithe, Auckland, inspired by the Californian mid-century modernism, in particular saluting American architect Frank Lloyd Wright. It also drew inspiration from Haresnape House by Bill Haresnape, another pavilion style house which Edwards cites as her favourite New Zealand house.

Edwards also worked on a modern extension of a character villa in Epsom, Auckland.

== Selected projects ==
- Eden Terrace Home - Eden Terrace. Auckland (2022) NZIA Auckland Architecture Awards 2023 Winner - Small Projects
- The Knoll - Greenhithe, Auckland (2018)
- Herne Bay Villa Renovation - Herne Bay, Auckland (2015)
- Tawini House - Titirangi, Auckland (2013) NZIA Auckland Architecture Awards 2016 Winner - Housing
- Pt Chevalier Bungalow (2012) NZIA Auckland Architecture Awards 2015 Winner - Alterations & Additions
