= Sharon Jansen =

Architect in New Zealand

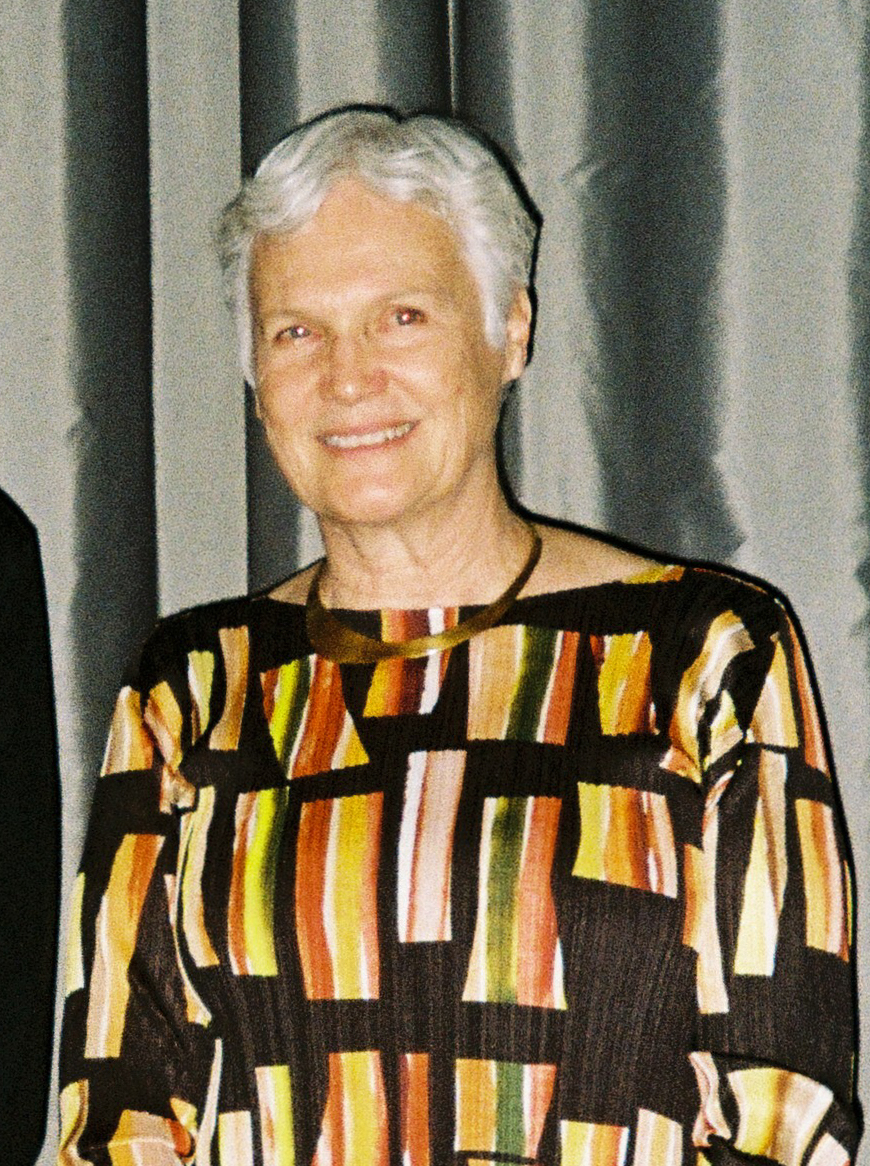
- Jansen in 2023
- Education: University of Auckland
- Occupation: Architect
- Practice: Jansen Luke Architects, Tennent + Brown Architects

Sharon Jansen is a New Zealand architect.

== Biography ==
Jansen studied architecture at the University of Auckland, graduating in 1984. She moved overseas and worked in Australia, Singapore and France. She returned to New Zealand after nine years, and worked in local architecture firms and for the Museum of New Zealand Te Papa Tongarewa as an exhibition designer. She established Jansen Luke Architects and later, in 2004, joined Tennent + Brown Architects as a senior architect.

In 2013, Jansen was a made a fellow of the New Zealand Institute of Architects (NZIA). In 2014, she returned to private practice with her own firm, Sharon Jansen Architect, specialising in residential new builds and restorations.

Jansen has tutored in architecture at Victoria University of Wellington and Massey University.

Tennent + Brown won a 2009 NZIA National Architecture Award for Leigh House in Northland, for which Jansen was design and project architect. Jansen has served on the jury of architecture awards, such as the 2015 New Zealand Architecture Awards and the 2020 Waikato / Bay of Plenty Architecture Awards.

In 2018, Jansen designed a renovation of a modernist house in Nelson, originally designed by Ernst Plischke. The project was awarded the NZIA National Architecture Award in 2019, noted for its "respectful restoration and skillful intervention" that reflected Plischke's original design intent.

In 2023, Jansen was awarded the Chrystall Excellence Awards at the A+W NZ Dulux Awards. The award celebrates women who have had a full and rich career in the field of architecture. The jury commented on Jansen's "very impressive body of sensitive design work, her continuing dedication and contribution to the profession and her mentorship and support of other women architects".
