= William Toomath =

New Zealand architect (1925–2014)

Bill Toomath
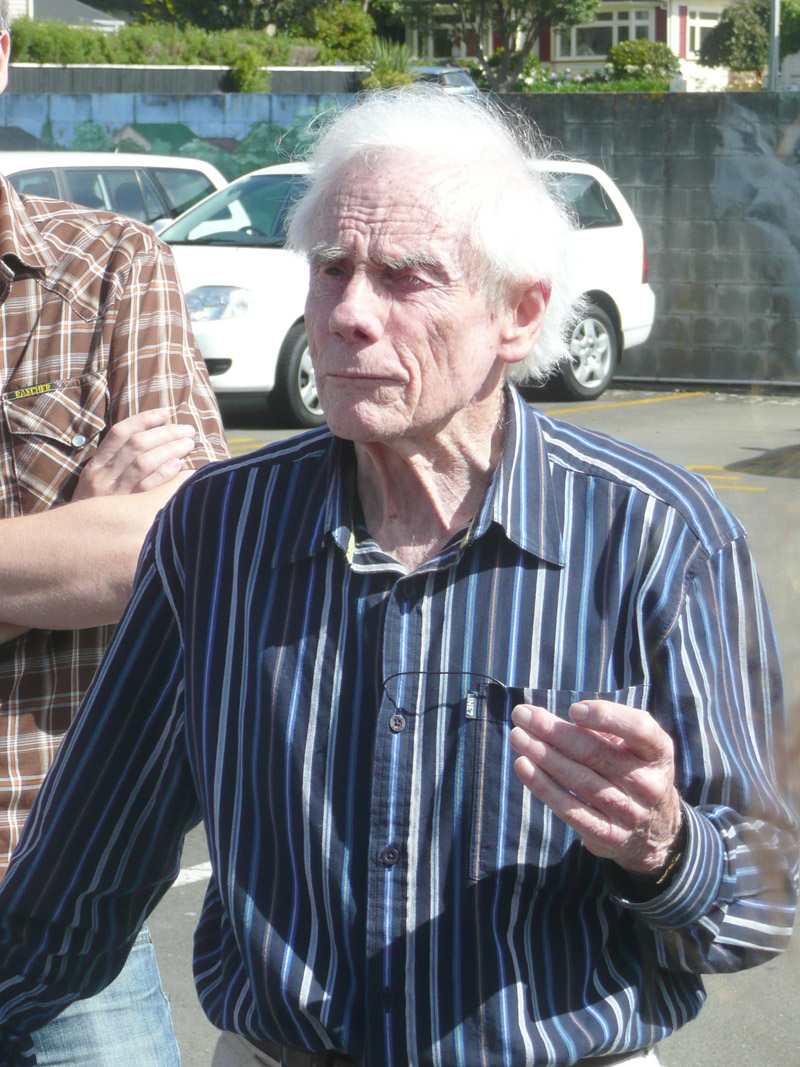
- Toomath in 2010
- Born: Stanley William Toomath; 12 November 1925; Lower Hutt, New Zealand
- Died: 20 March 2014 (aged 88); Wellington, New Zealand
- Occupation: Architect
- Buildings: Toomath Senior House; Wool House (Wellington); Mackay House; Wellington Teachers' College

Stanley William Toomath (12 November 1925 – 20 March 2014) was a New Zealand architect who practised mainly in Wellington. He was a founding member of the Architectural Group in Auckland in 1946, a life member of the Wellington Architectural Centre and a Fellow of the New Zealand Institute of Architects. Both the founding of the Group and the Architectural Centre were important factors in New Zealand's modernist architectural history.

== Early life and education ==
Born in Lower Hutt, Toomath studied architecture at the Auckland College of the University of New Zealand between 1945 and 1949. He graduated with a Bachelor of Architecture, and was awarded a UNZ two-year travelling scholarship which took him to Europe in 1951. Adding an early Fulbright Graduate Award in 1952 enabled him to complete a MArch at the Harvard Graduate School of Design where he was taught by I. M. Pei and was a co-student with John Hejduk. He briefly worked with Walter Gropius at the Architects' Collaborative and then with I. M. Pei before returning to New Zealand in 1954.

== Architectural practice ==
On his return from New York Toomath set up practice, and three years later was joined by Derek Wilson to establish Toomath and Wilson. Toomath and Wilson were later joined by Don Irvine and Grahame Anderson in 1972, forming the firm Toomath Wilson Irvine Anderson Ltd.

Toomath's work reflects an exploratory and intelligent engagement with modernist architectural ideas. A key architectural interest was the articulation of continuous space, which is particularly evident in his Toomath Senior house, Lower Hutt (1949), and the Mackay house, Silverstream (1961). The Toomath Senior house is famous as the site of a discussion Toomath and Lew Martin had with architectural historian Nikolaus Pevsner about New Zealand construction. Pevsner found the detailing of a post in the carport unrefined. Toomath argued that it reflected an honesty in detailing, relevant to New Zealand architecture. The Mackay House, Silverstream is symmetrically planned and was designed for a couple without children. It was awarded the New Zealand Institute of Architects (NZIA) Bronze Medal in 1962.

Toomath's other key works include Wool House, Featherston Street, Wellington (1955, in association with Bernard Johns & Whitwell) and the Wellington Teachers' College, Donald Street, Karori (1966–1977). The Wellington Teachers College, Karori, Stage One was awarded an NZIA Silver Medal (1972), and an NZIA Local Award (Enduring Architecture) (2005). Wool House (also now known as Old Wool House) was recognised with an NZIA Wellington Branch Enduring Architecture Award (2002) and the residential Dobson House, Hankey St, Wellington received an NZIA Wellington Branch Enduring Architecture Award (2004).

== Architectural exhibitions and advocacy ==
Following his return from studying architecture in the United States and working with Walter Gropius and I. M. Pei, Toomath spent the majority of his architectural career in New Zealand (including over 35 years in professional practice). He was an advocate for several heritage buildings (see below), and played key roles in the Wellington Architectural Centre's projects on Wellington's urban form, namely: "Te Aro Replanned" (1947), "Homes Without Sprawl" (1957), "City Approaches" (1959) and "Wgtn 196X" (1961). Toomath also presented professional evidence for the Wellington City Council on proposals for controlling building heights, protected viewshafts and urban form planning (1989–1990) in hearings before the Planning Tribunal.

Toomath led a small team whose report on the Old Town Hall stopped moves for its demolition. He wrote papers on conservation matters and presented evidence in support of a number of heritage buildings including: the AMP Head Office Building, the State Fire Insurance Building, Wharf Sheds 7 and 21. He had an active role in campaigns to save Old St Paul's.

== Design educator ==
Toomath was also the Head of the School of Design, Wellington Polytechnic (1979–1989), and a contributor of articles to the New Zealand journal Designscape. He was a regular participant of the "Designmark" Advisory Panels, New Zealand Industrial Design Council from 1969, and a Judge of the Prince Philip Award for New Zealand Industrial Design (1981–1985).

== Documentary ==
Toomath is the subject of a documentary Antonello and the Architect, which reveals his influences, designs, ideas, and the study that he built based on Antonello da Messina's 15th century painting St Jerome in His Study.

== Personal life ==
His father was Roderick William Toomath, who was elected as a member of the Petone Borough Council in 1929.
