= Anthony Treadwell =

New Zealand architect (1922–2003)

Anthony Lawrance Treadwell (27 February 1922 – 15 September 2003) was an early member of the Wellington Architectural Centre and an accomplished modernist architect, architectural educator and painter. His architectural work has been published in numerous articles in New Zealand Home and Building, the Arts Year Book, the Journal of the N.Z.I.A. and the Wellington Architectural Centre's Design Review.

== Early career ==
Treadwell was born in 1922. His architectural career began as a draughtsman in the Air Force before working in the Architectural Division of the Ministry of Works, and private practice. His designwork included factories, office buildings, flats, houses and churches, with examples of his domestic architecture including the Etherton House in Miramar, the Atkins House in Upper Hutt and the Blumhardt House of 1957. In 1953 he described the Aitkens house in terms which find resonance with contemporary ambitions for domestic living:

"While the family is just a young married couple the requirements remain simple. There is no need for elaborate living — no ritual of meals solemnly served or activities placed into compartments. There can be a free and easy way of life with both members of the family taking part. The easiness of the holiday bach in a permanent house was looked for, but with the finish and sophistication of a town dwelling."

In the late 1950s he became a partner in Treadwell and Wild. The 1958 Hazelcourt Flats in Claremont Grove is an example of their work from this period. Another of Treadwell's successful collaborations was the Willeston Galleries in Manners St with H. H. Geddes. He chaired a SANZ committee on drawing office standards and was actively involved revising the syllabus for architecture drafting courses for the Technicians Certification Authority of New Zealand. More recently he and his daughter Sarah recreated his mural in the Takapuna "Experimental House" by Group Construction for the 1950s show at Auckland City Art Gallery in 1992.

== Teaching ==
In addition to his successful architectural practice he taught at the architecture schools at the Auckland University College (as an assistant studio instructor), the Wellington Polytech, and Victoria University of Wellington (as a Senior Lecturer 1978–87), and he was actively involved in the Architectural Centre' summer schools. In an article discussing the redesign of Te Aro project, Treadwell described the Architectural Centre as:

"a body of men and women, chiefly architects and students of architecture, but also comprising many interested people, artists, writers, men of science, town-planners and others who are interested in architecture.”

== Personal life ==
Treadwell's daughter is architect, academic and artist Sarah Treadwell.
