= Vernon Brown (architect) =

New Zealand architect, university lecturer and painter (1905–1965)

Vernon Akitt Brown (23 March 1905–28 January 1965) was a New Zealand architect and university lecturer. He was born in Liverpool, Lancashire, England on 23 March 1905 and educated at Highgate School.
