= Elizabeth Cox (historian) =

New Zealand historian

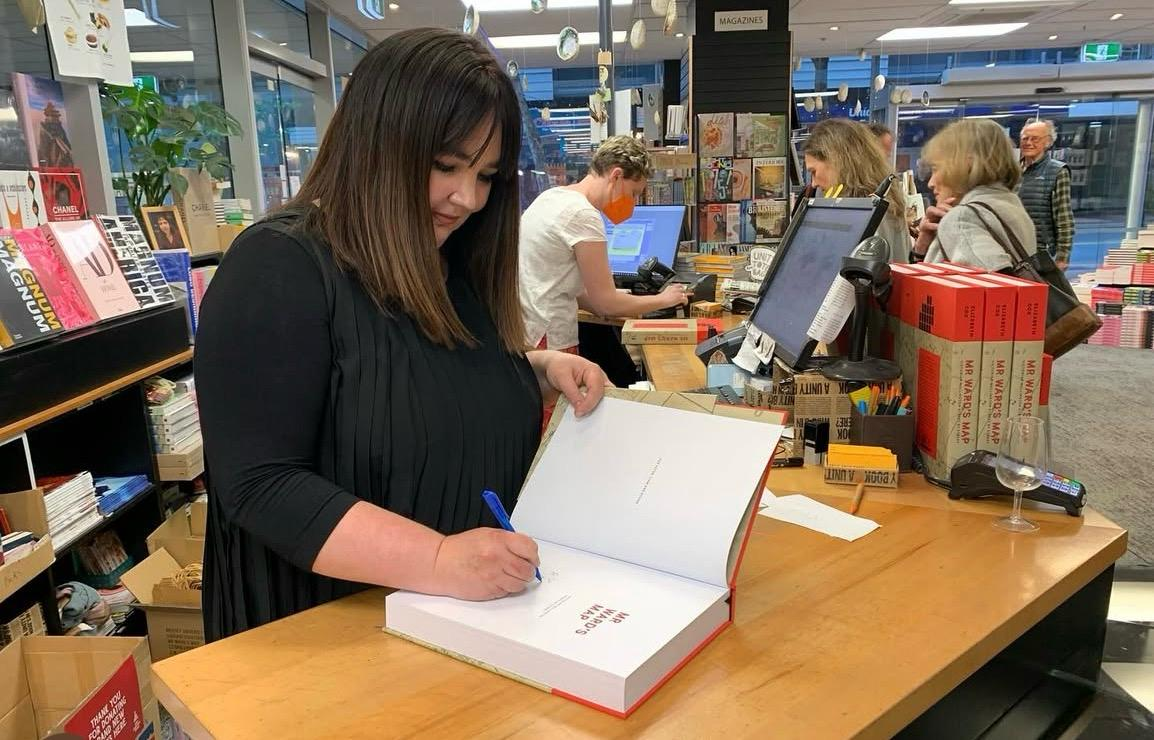
- Cox in 2025
- Born: Elizabeth Cox

Academic background
- Education: Victoria University of Wellington

Academic work
- Discipline: Historian
- Sub-discipline: Architectural history; women's history
- Institutions: Bay Heritage Consultants
- Website: https://bayheritage.co.nz/

Elizabeth Cox is a New Zealand historian who specialises in architectural and women's history. She is a heritage consultant and was a senior historian at the Ministry for Culture and Heritage.

== Education ==
Cox studied New Zealand history at Victoria University of Wellington, completing an MA.

== Career ==
Cox has previously worked at the New Zealand Historic Places Trust, at the National Trust in the UK, and as a historian for the Waitangi Tribunal. She was also a senior historian at the Ministry for Culture and Heritage, and runs a consultancy business exploring the history of New Zealand's heritage buildings. Her book A Friend Indeed: The Saving of Old St Paul's, about the battle to save Old St Paul's Church in Wellington, was published in 2018.

Cox was the editor of the 2022 publication Making Space: a history of New Zealand women in architecture, which contained contributions from 30 women architects, architectural historians and academics. The publication is considered to be a valuable contribution to the recording and honouring of women practicing architecture in New Zealand. In 2023, she received a New Zealand Institute of Architects President's Award. In 2025 she published Mr Ward's Map: Victorian Wellington Street by Street, a history of Wellington in the 1890s. This book won the Ockham New Zealand Book Awards for Illustrated Non-Fiction in 2026. The judges said of the book covers a "range of complex issues and histories that have universal reach".

Cox is also a trustee of the Futuna Chapel in Wellington.

== Selected publications ==
- — (2025). Mr Ward's Map: Victorian Wellington Street by Street. Massey University Press. ISBN 9781991309068.
- —, ed. (2022). Making Space : a history of New Zealand women in architecture. Auckland, NZ: Massey University Press. ISBN 9781991016348.
- — (2018). A friend indeed : the saving of Old St Paul's. Wellington, NZ: The Friends of Old St Paul's Society. ISBN 9780473397722.
- Cochran, Christopher; Russell, Murray; Kelly, Michael & — (2016). Old St Paul's, 34 Mulgrave Street, Wellington, conservation plan : report prepared by Cochran and Murray Conservation Architects. Wellington, NZ: Heritage New Zealand Pouhere Taonga. ISBN 9781877563270.
