= Megan Rule =

New Zealand architect

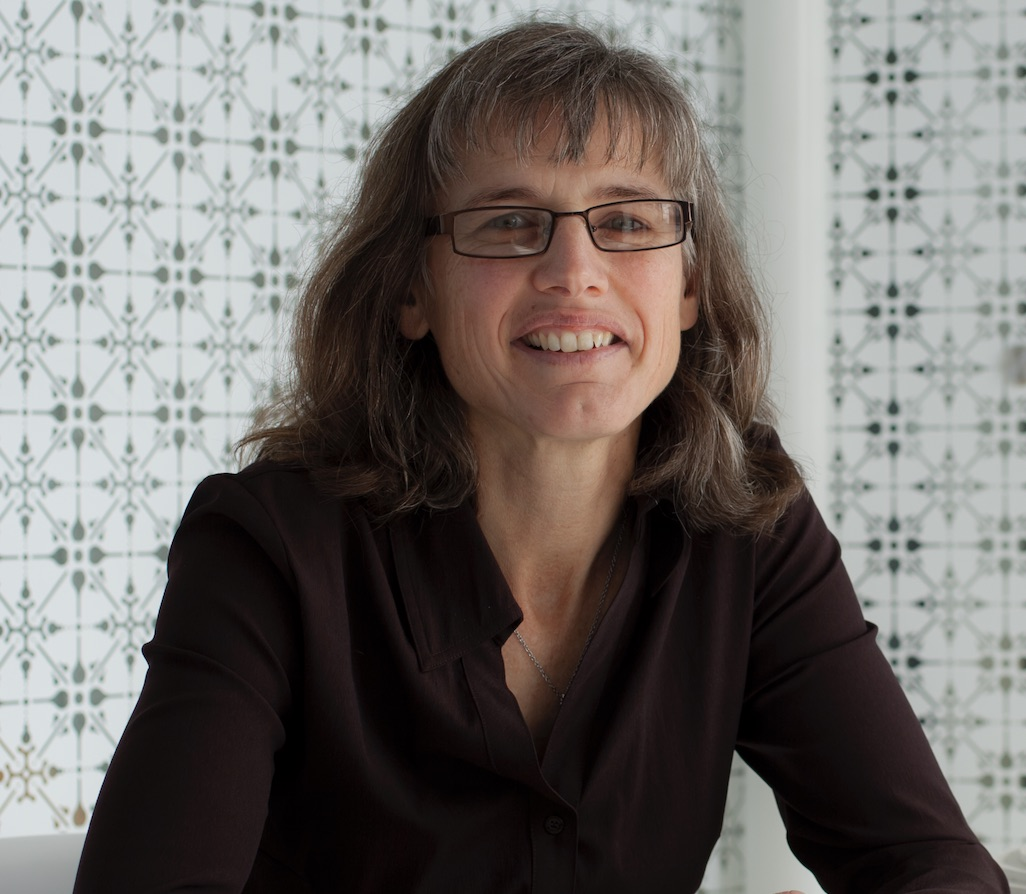
- Born: New Zealand
- Education: University of Auckland
- Occupation: Architect
- Awards: Helen Tippett Award (2016)
- Practice: South Pacific Architecture
- Buildings: Northland Waterfall Chapel

Megan Rule is a New Zealand architect. She was a recipient of a National Association of Women in Construction Excellence Award in 2016.

== Biography ==
Rule studied architecture at the University of Auckland, graduating in 1992. She has worked with community groups, not-for-profits, churches, clubs, Pacific groups, iwi, Ngā Aho, and accessibility organisations in New Zealand and internationally. She has been a director for Habitat for Humanity and Architecture for Humanity.

In 2000, Rule founded South Pacific Architecture in Auckland, focusing on architecture for diversity. She is the chair of Te Kāhui Whaihanga New Zealand Institute of Architects' Auckland branch. Rule is also a teaching fellow at the School of Architecture and Planning at the University of Auckland and co-founder of Architecture+Women NZ. She was inaugural co-chair of the organisation for five years, from 2011 to 2016.

Rule's work features in the book Worship: A History of New Zealand Church Design by Bill McKay and Jane Ussher, and in The Phaidon 21st Century Atlas of World Architecture.

== Awards and honours ==
Rule's Northland Waterfall Chapel (2003) won the Premio Internazionale Dedalos Minosse Award in Italy, and was the first New Zealand project to win. In 2016, Rule won the National Association of Women in Construction Helen Tippett Award for actively promoting women in construction.
