= Mervyn Taylor (artist) =

New Zealand engraver, commercial artist, publisher (1906–1964)

- Born: Ernest Mervyn Taylor; 4 August 1906; Auckland, New Zealand
- Died: 7 June 1964 (aged 57); Wellington, New Zealand
- Known for: Wood engraving; Mural
- Movement: Modernism

Ernest Mervyn Taylor (1906–1964) was a notable New Zealand engraver, commercial artist and publisher. He was born in Auckland, New Zealand in 1906 but primarily lived and worked in Wellington, New Zealand until his sudden death at the age of 58.

== Murals ==
Taylor completed a number of murals towards the end of his career. Information is varied on the current status of these works: some are known to be intact, some have been boarded over, some are in need of restoration work, and the fate of others is simply unknown. Between 2015 and 2018, these works were the subject of the E. Mervyn Taylor Mural Search and Recovery Project at the College of Creative Arts, Massey University. The project lead to a book Wanted: The Search for the Modernist Murals of E. Mervyn Taylor.

=== List of murals ===
Original Location	Architects	Mural title	Medium	Dimensions H x W mm	Artist	Date	Current Location	Heritage listed
Wellington; New Zealand Meat Board Directors' Room, Massey House, 126–132 Lambton Quay	Plischke & Firth		Carved totara panel		E. Mervyn Taylor	c. 1957	Unknown	
Otaki; War Memorial Hall, 69 Main St			Sandblasted glass windows	2610 x 2440	E. Mervyn Taylor	1957	In situ	
Wellington; Khandallah Presbyterian Church, 27 Ganges Rd, Khandallah		The Ascension	Sandblasted glass windows		E. Mervyn Taylor	1959	In situ	
Masterton; Post Office, 122 Queen St		Early Settlers	Ceramic tiles	4400 x 4400	E. Mervyn Taylor	1960	Hidden behind a wall	Masterton District Council
New Plymouth; War Memorial Hall, Museum & Library, 1 Ariki St	Edgar Collins		Sandblasted glass window	1800 x 3300	E. Mervyn Taylor	1960	In situ. Site now Puke Ariki	
New Plymouth; Post Office, Cnr Gill and Currie Sts	Edgar Collins		Sandblasted glass atrium ceiling	Estimated to 8000 x 8000	E. Mervyn Taylor	c. 1960	In situ. Partially covered and difficult to view. Site now occupied by ANZ Banking Group	
Masterton; War Memorial Stadium Hall of Memories, 2 Dixon St, North Masterton		Lest We Forget	Ceramic tiles	1995 x 3685	E. Mervyn Taylor	1960–61/1966	In situ	
Wairoa; Centennial Library, 212 Marine Parade	Porter & Martin (A.A.)		Painted wall partition, using Resene PVA matt latex paint	3500 x 3160	E. Mervyn Taylor	c. 1961	Unknown	
Hutt Valley; Foyer of Soil Bureau, 182 Eastern Hutt Rd, Taita	Porter & Martin (A.A.)	First Kumera Planting	Painting directly on concrete wall, using Resene PVA matt latex paint	1850 x 2750	E. Mervyn Taylor	1962	Unknown. Site now occupied by The Learning Connexion art school	
Wellington; Foyer (assumed) of National Mutual Life Assurance Building, 153 Featherston St	Gray Young, Morton & Calder		Painting directly on wall	Approx. 2140 x 7315	E. Mervyn Taylor	1963	Unknown. Site now occupied by the Ibis Hotel	
Auckland; COMPAC building, 1 Akoranga Drive, Northcote		Te Ika-a-Māui	Ceramic tiles	Approx. 2625 x 3430	E. Mervyn Taylor	1962	Auckland. Takapuna Library. Property of Spark NZ	
Wellington; Foyer of Broadcasting House	Supervising architect: Gordon Wilson (Government Architect)	Time and Space	Carved kauri panel, from one plank	800 x 1850	E. Mervyn Taylor	1963	RNZ boardroom, Radio New Zealand House, 155 The Terrace	
Wellington; Cable Price Downer House, 108 (106–110) The Terrace	Orchiston, Power & Associates	Industry	Ceramic tiles	Approx. 3005 x 3005	E. Mervyn Taylor	1964	Unknown. Site now Berl House	

=== Notes on individual murals ===
==== First Kumera Planting, Taita Soil Bureau ====
One of his commissions was a mural at the Taitā headquarters of the Department of Scientific and Industrial Research (DSIR), Soil Bureau, depicting a cloaked Māori figure using a kō (digging stick). In the short film "Pictorial Parade No. 128", produced in 1962 by the National Film Unit, Taylor can be seen discussing the mural with Norman Taylor (Director of the Soil Bureau), and subsequently painting it.

==== Te Ika-a-Māui, COMPAC Building ====
The mural was commissioned by the New Zealand Government to mark the 1962 completion of the Tasman leg of the Commonwealth Pacific Cable System (COMPAC)—an underwater telephone cable system connecting New Zealand to its Commonwealth allies in the aftermath of World War Two. The mural was originally housed in the COMPAC landing station in Auckland. In 2014 this mural was discovered by artist Bronwyn Holloway-Smith. The work was brought to public attention once again through her project Te Ika-a-Akoranga.

== Design gallery ==
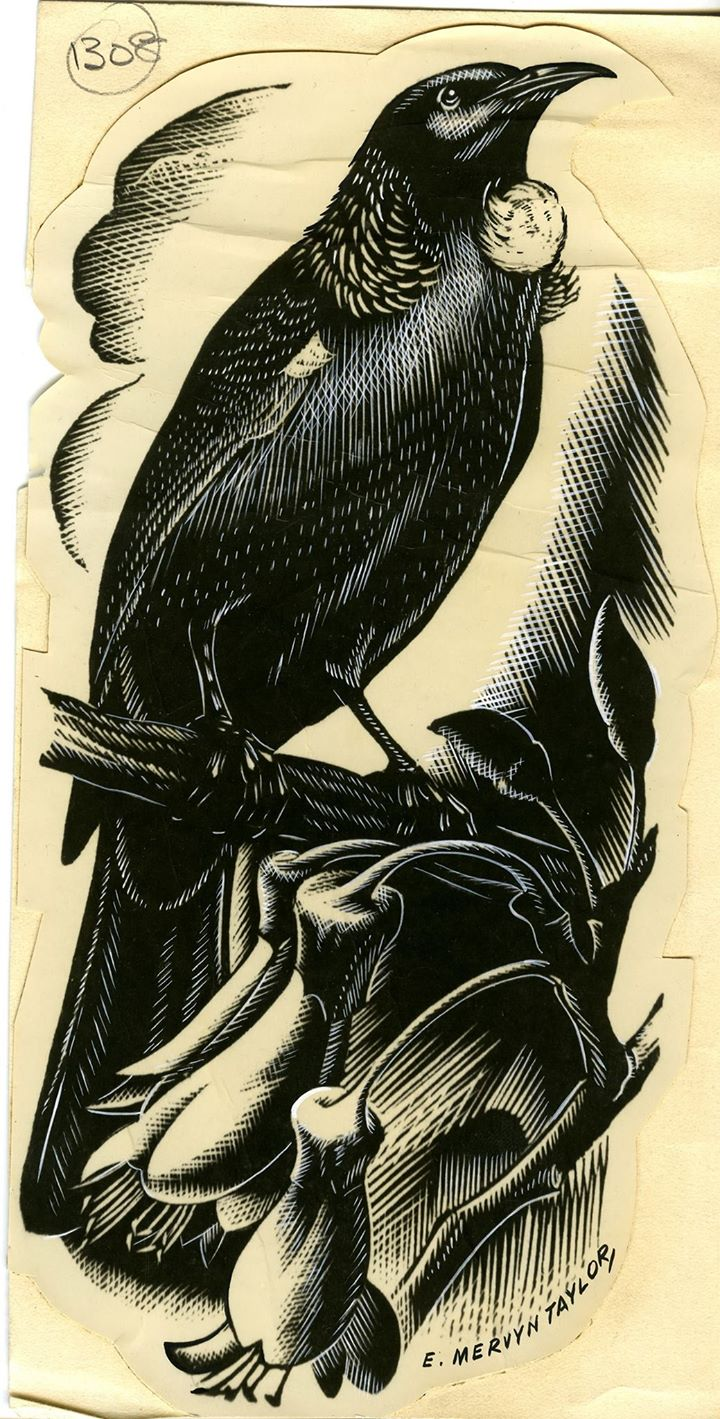
Woodcut:Tui

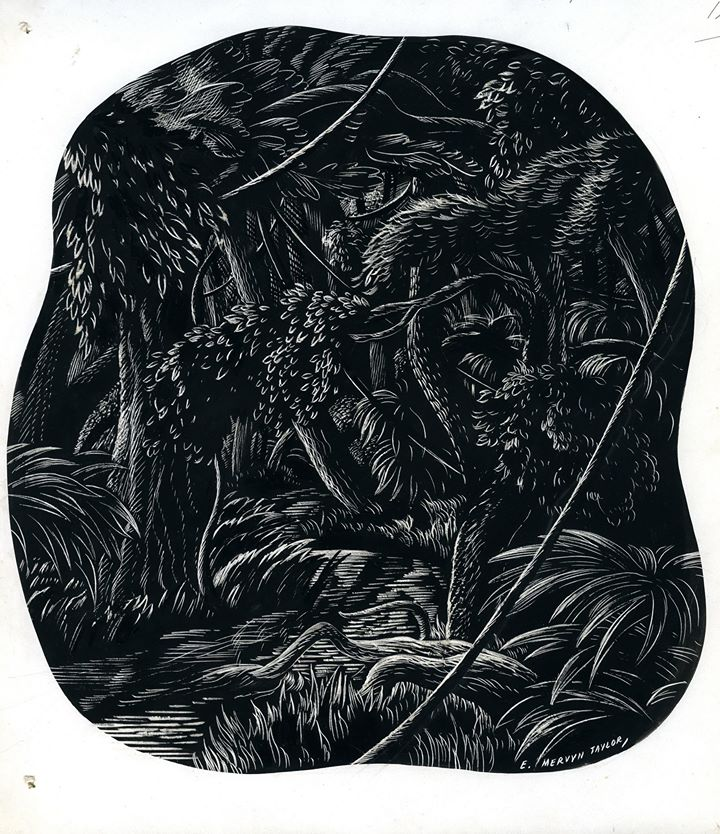
Woodcut

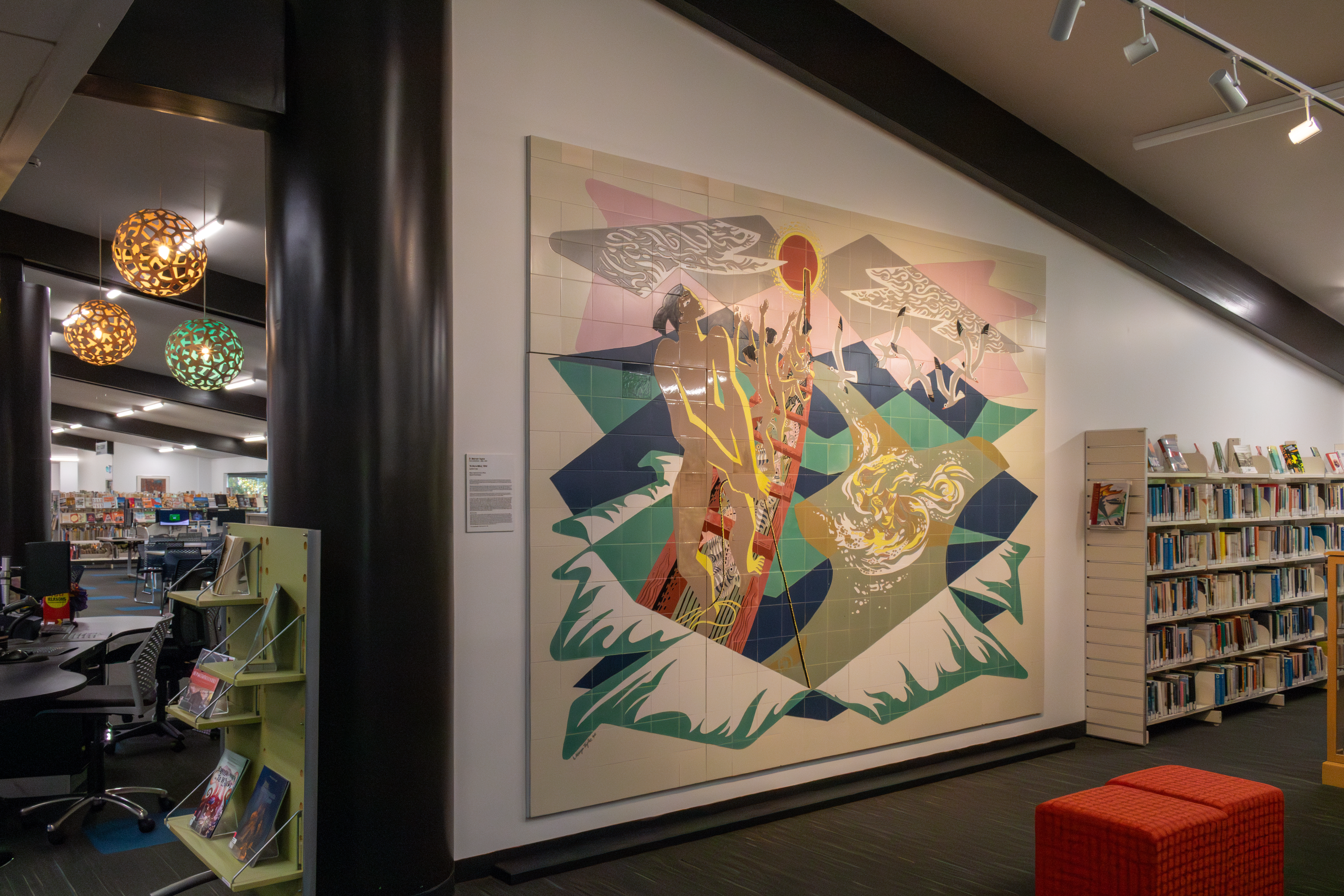
Mural: Te Ika-a-Māui, 1962. Takapuna Library, Auckland.

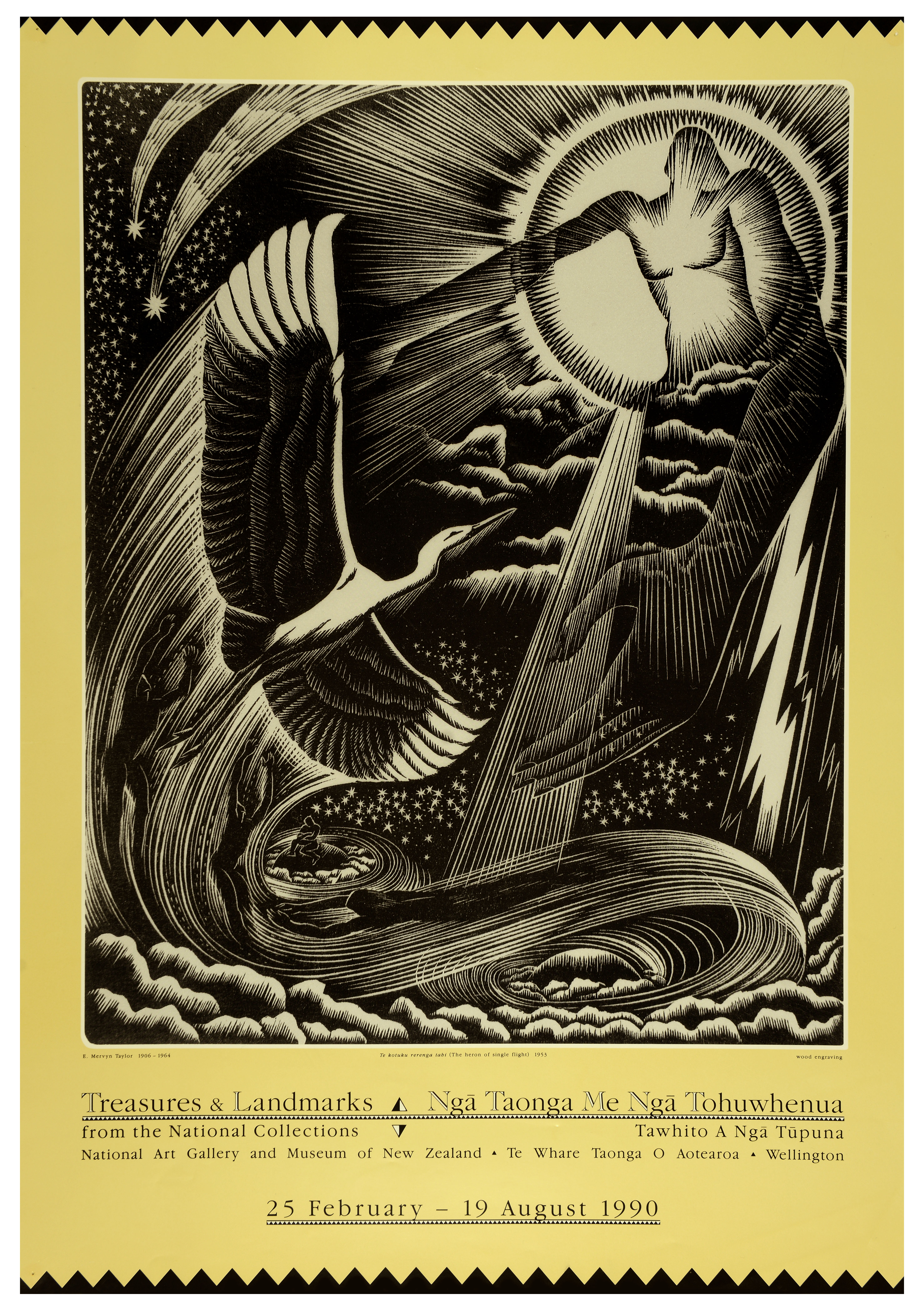
Treasures & Landscapes poster, 1990. Museum of New Zealand

== Publications ==
- Taylor, Ernest Mervyn (1957). Engravings on Wood. Wellington: The Mermaid Press.
- Talylor, Ernest Mervyn (1946). A Book of Wood Engravings. Christchurch: Caxton Press.

== Other sources ==
- Packer, Ann (24 November 2007). "Bound to be Noticed". The Dominion Post. No. Supplement "Indulgence". p. 20.
- Warne, Kennedy (September–October 2007). "Mervyn Taylor: The Renaissance Man of Karori". New Zealand Geographic. No. 87. pp. 98–108.
- "Prints charming: after years of marginalisation, artist E Mervyn Taylor is finally getting his due". New Zealand Listener. Vol. 205, no. 3462. 16 September 2006. p. 40.
- "Wood Engravings by Mervyn Taylor". Design Review. Vol. 4, no. 3. Wellington: Architectural Centre Inc. June–July 1952. pp. 64–65.
- Lowry, Robert William (1951). "E Mervyn Taylor". Here and Now. No. 5. January / February. Auckland. pp. 38, 42.
- Wadman, Howard, ed. (1947). "E Mervyn Taylor". Year Book of the Arts in New Zealand (3). Wellington: H. H. Tombs Limited: 116–119, 147.
