= Architecture of New Zealand =

Architecture of New Zealand is a built environment of regions, cities and towns of New Zealand, which is best known for its connection to the land between both islands, its use of local materials, and its incorporation of natural elements. New Zealand architects has been generally consistent with architectural trends in the wider Western world, with some special adaptations to compensate for distinctive New Zealand climatic and cultural factors. In a connection to the land between North and South Islands, New Zealand architecture often reflects the surrounding landscape and topography. Contemporary homes may follow the contours of the land and respond to the views of nearby natural landmarks. Although the design of New Zealand homes enhances a connection with the environment.

New Zealand's architecture is influenced by various cultures and building traditions from around the world, and the island country holds incredible works of commercial, residential, and cultural design. Some of the country's iconic buildings were built with dark basalt blocks or Oamaru stone. These projects are tied to the country's past and geography.

== History ==
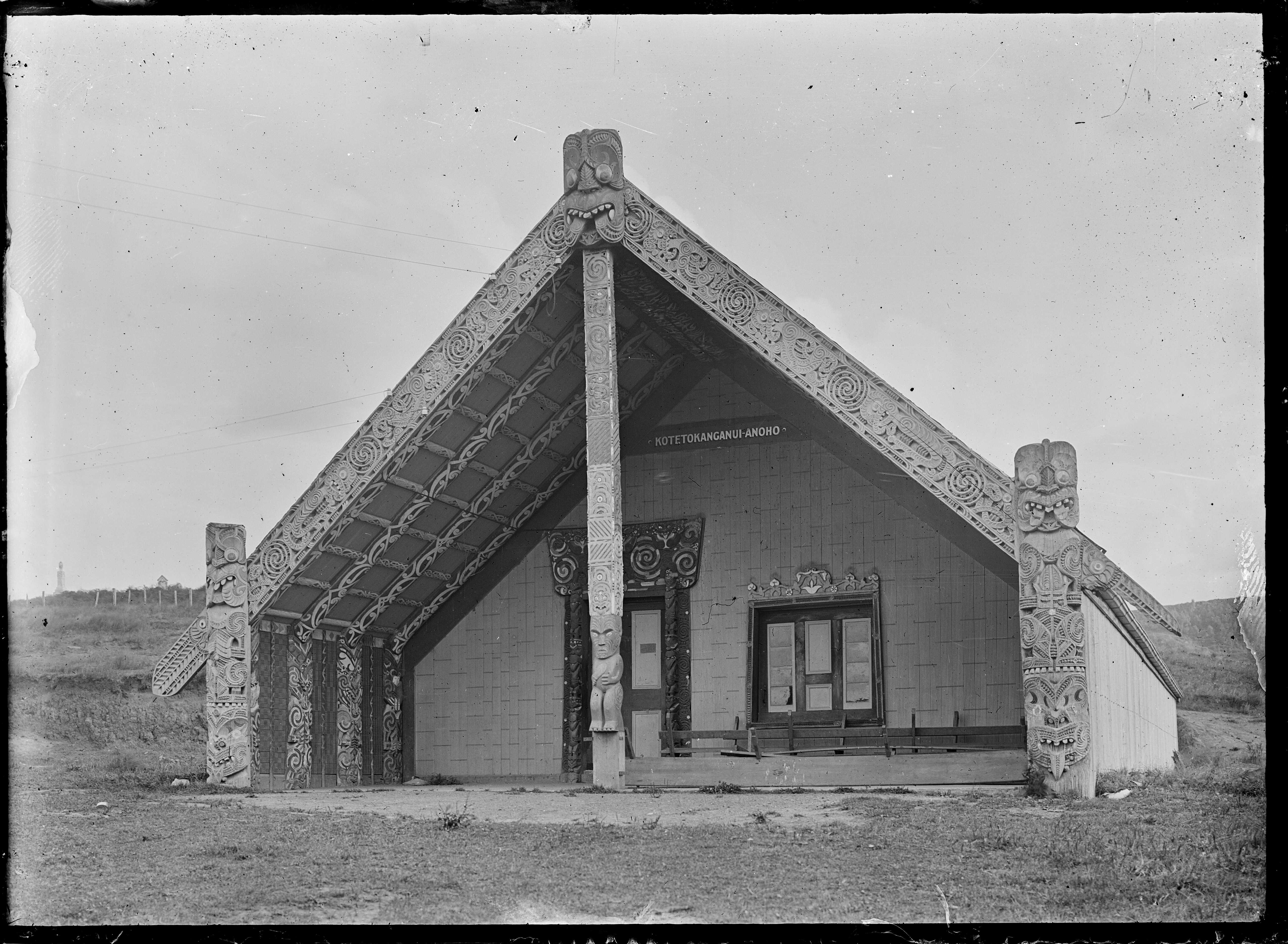
Meeting house (wharenui) of Te Tokanganui-A-Noho at Te Kūiti photographed by Albert Percy Godber in 1917.

The indigenous Māori peoples of New Zealand are descendants of voyagers from islands of the Pacific 800–900 years ago. The homegrown architecture developed of the later Māori was an 'elaborate tradition of timber architecture'. Māori constructed rectangular buildings (whare) with a 'small door, an extension of the roof and walls to form a porch, and an interior with hearths along the centre and sleeping places along the walls' for protection against the cold. These structures differed from those in the Pacific, but the organisation was the same with buildings centering around an open communal space, called the marae ātea. Woodworking, carving and construction skills were demonstrated in 'elaborate elevated storage houses' called pataka.

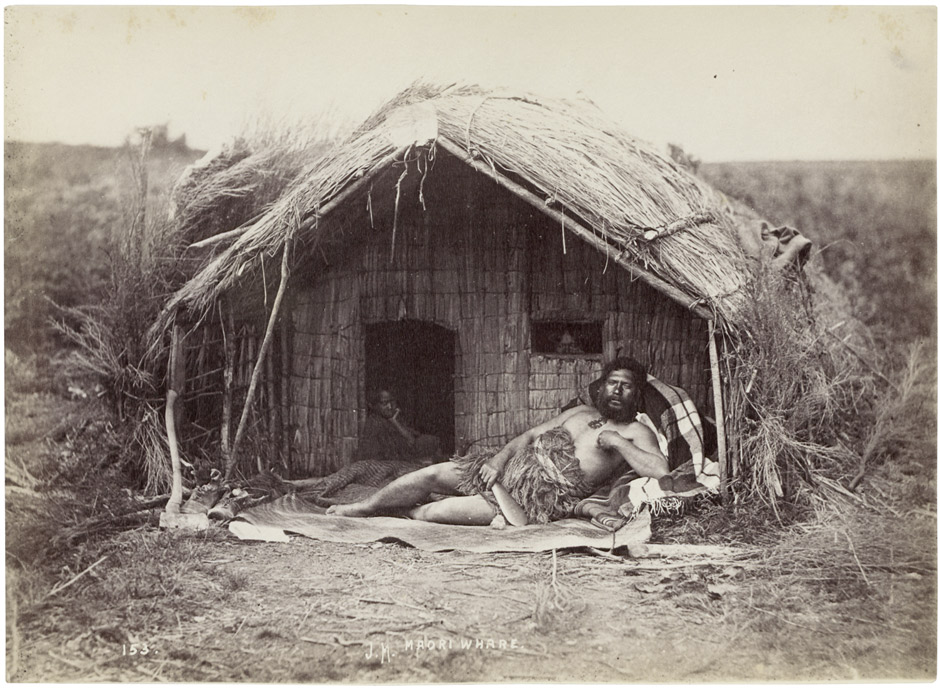
Whare mid 1870s (man at front is the Chief Tahau)

Large numbers of settlers came to New Zealand from Europe after 1840. European buildings were derivative of the European fashions of the time and most colonialists were from England so they reflected English ideas. The early buildings were largely constructed from timber due to ample supply and a comparative lack for other materials. Early civic building such as the governor generals house were built from prefabricated kit-sets. There was a Gothic revival style of the 1840s–1860s, and early architects included Benjamin Mountfort and Frederick Thatcher. William Mason was the first superintendent of works and would later become Colonial Architect. Although prior to the 1860s there was a lack of qualified architects in the country and most buildings were designed by draughtsmen. Noticeable public interest in architecture developed after 1860. Most early buildings in New Zealand were made from timber due to the abundance and risk of earthquakes. shingles were the common roofing method until it was outlawed as a fire hazard with corrugated iron replacing it. Slate became more common near the end of the 19th-century with Marseilles tiles replacing it from the 1890s to 1920s. Timber buildings in the cities such as Wellington imitated the ornate detailings found on stone architecture in Europe — one writer compared Wellington a "toy version" of Nuremberg. Notable examples include Charles Tringham's Gothic Manners Street Wesleyan Church and Colonial Architect William Clayton's Renaissance Government Building. Not all architects were supportive of this technique with Frederick de Jersey Clere considering it "deceitful" and complaining to the Royal Institute of British Architects over it. As was common in Britain and Australia ecclesiastical structures were largely built in a Gothic style and civic, commercial, and secular structures were typically built in a neo-Classical style. Some disliked the classical style such as James Edward FitzerGerald considering it antiquated and unfashionable. By the late 19th-century architecture had become a proper profession in New Zealand and New Zealand architects were viewed positively by home country contemporaries — the Auckland Institute of Architects provided submissions to the 1886 Colonial and Indian Exhibition. These were looked upon favourably, with Lawrence Harvey writing:

A long notice might be written on the architectural works of our Australian and New Zealand colleagues, for their exhibit of architectural drawings is on the grandest scale. It makes us fully realise how thoroughly up to the mark our Antipodean fellow subjects are in all the arts of advanced civilisation, for they show us that their towns vie with our own in every way, and that our distant colleagues can do everything as well, and even better, than ourselves.

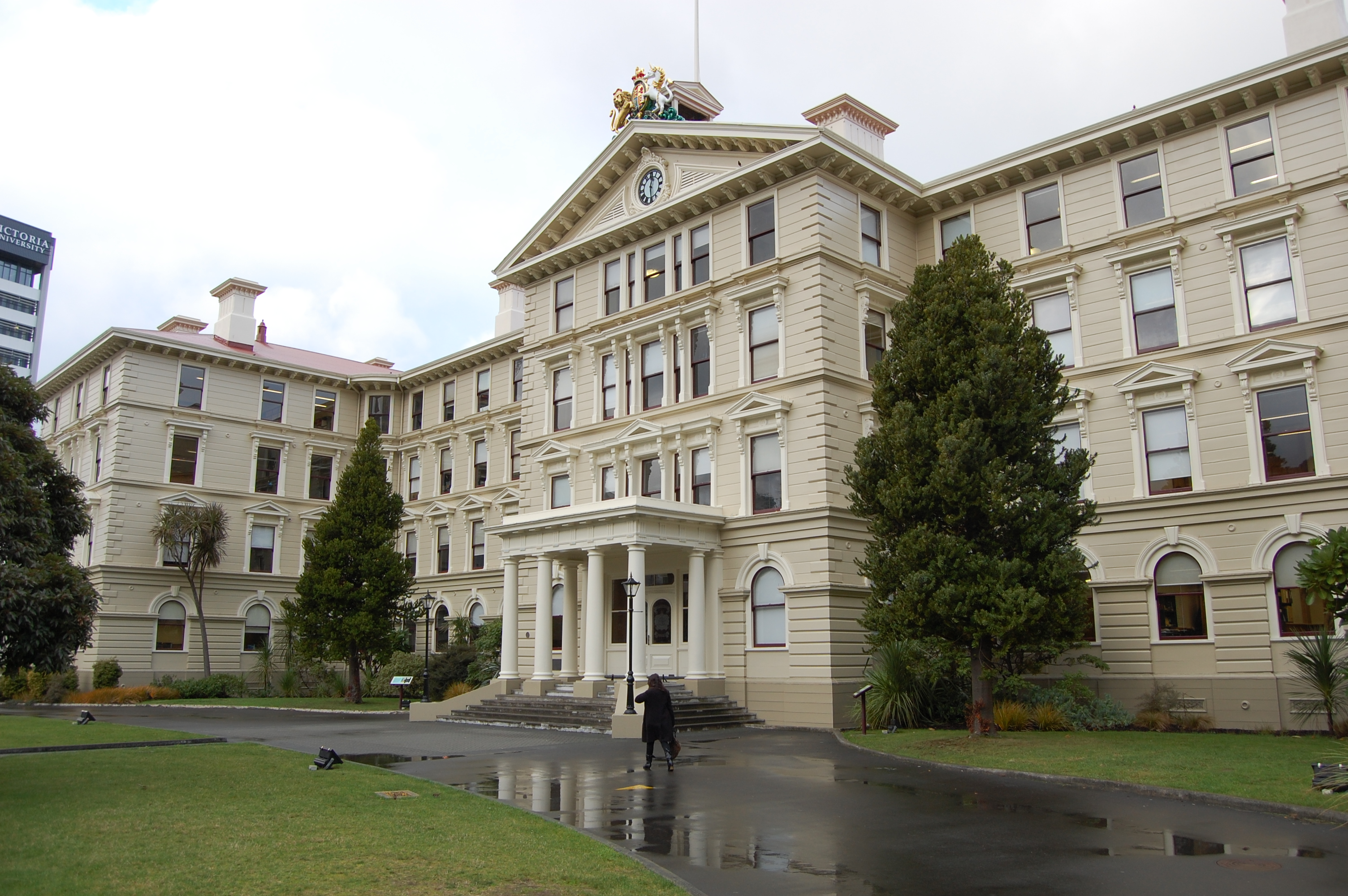
Clayton's Government Building is a notable example of timber construction that used detailings to give the appearance of masonry.

In 1900 Wise's New Zealand post office directory listed 10 architects and 4 architectural partnerships, although the number excludes architects in government employment. Prior to the passing of the New Zealand Institute of Architects act in 1913 there was no legal definition of architect and many builders and draughtsmen transitioned into architecture. In 1917 Auckland University opened the first school of architecture in the country, but its first professor—Cyril Roy Knight—was not appointed until 1924. Despite a domestic school many architects still travelled to Europe for training and experience and European architecture continued to influence New Zealand architecture. Although many architects including those in the home country were positive about the European influence some architects such as Samuel Hurst Seager complained about the lack of a distinctive New Zealand style and considered the adoption of European styles as a "sham" and "deceitful".

The community meeting house of Māori communities, whare whakairo, emerged as a form of significant architecture from the early 1940s. In 2024 there were about 1000 in use and half of them originated between 1880 and 1950. Architectural historian Deidre Brown and art history professor Ngarino Ellis describe whare whakairo as the "ultimate artistic expression of identity and tūrangawaewae" for Māori.

Significant early colonial buildings include Stone Store, Kemp House (Kerikeri), Pompalier House, Waitangi Treaty House and Old St Paul's in Wellington. In 1905 the New Zealand Institute of Architects was formed.

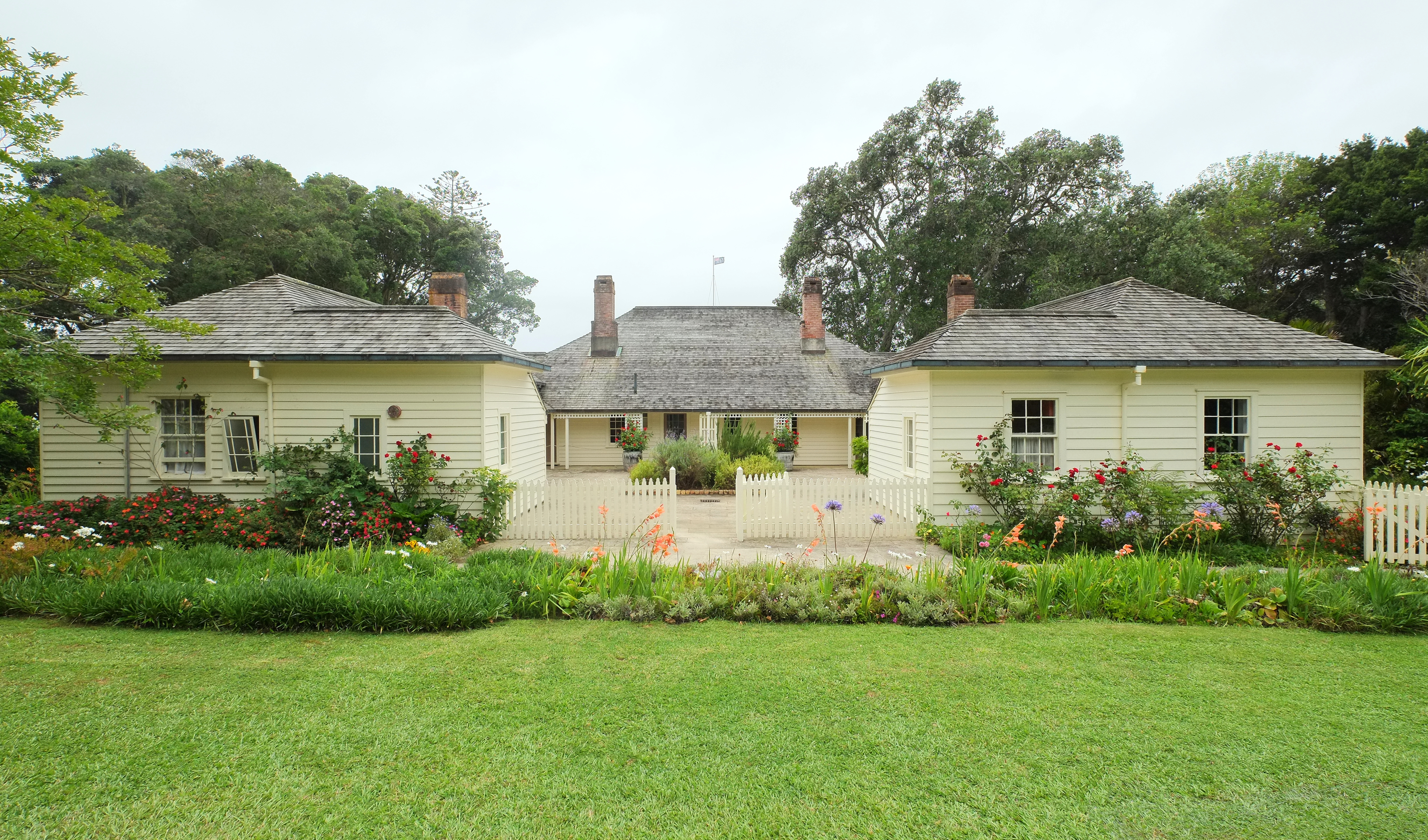
Treaty House (from the back) built in 1833–34

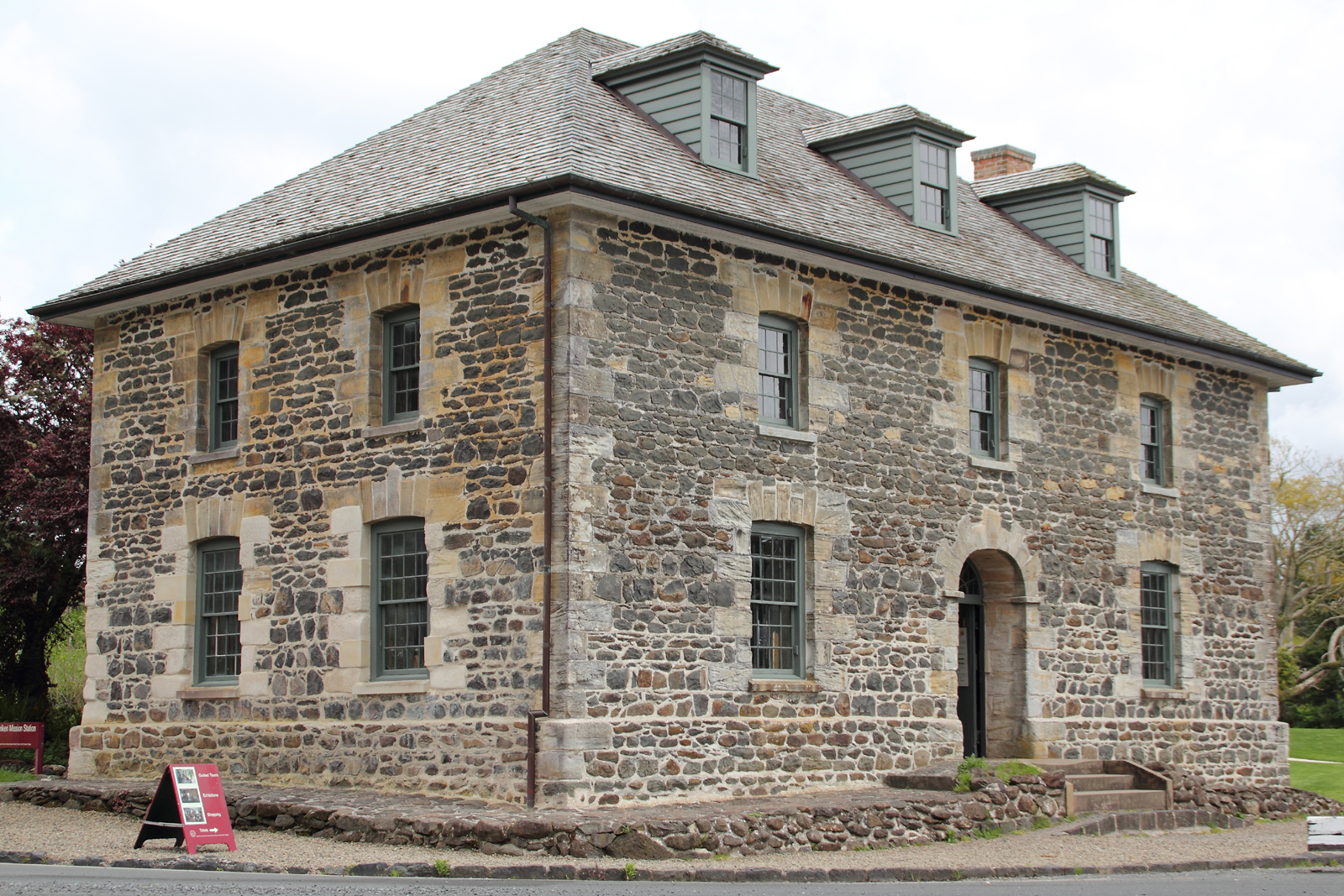
Stone Store, oldest stone building in New Zealand 1836

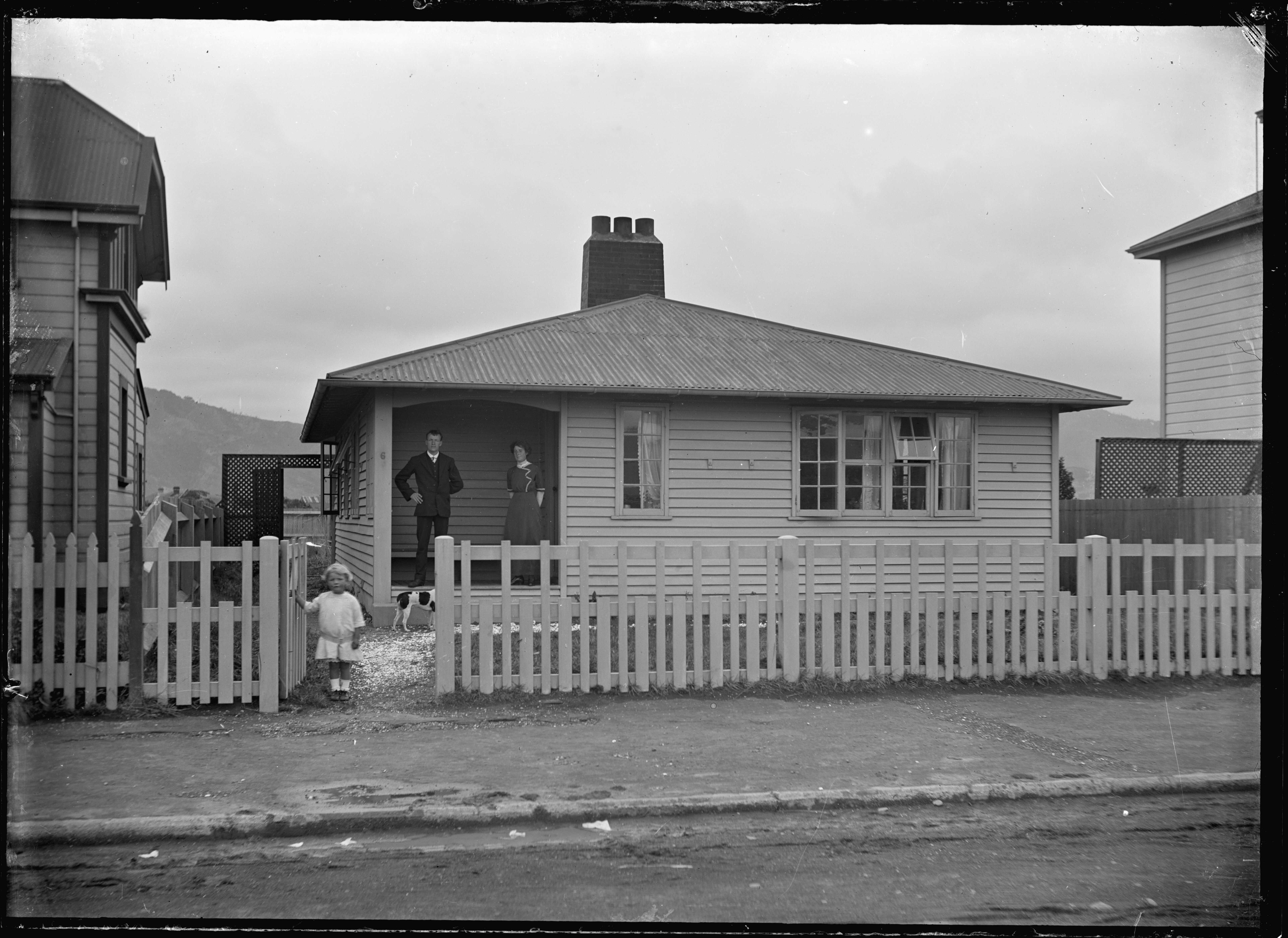
State house, Petone constructed in 1906 designed by Cecil Wood

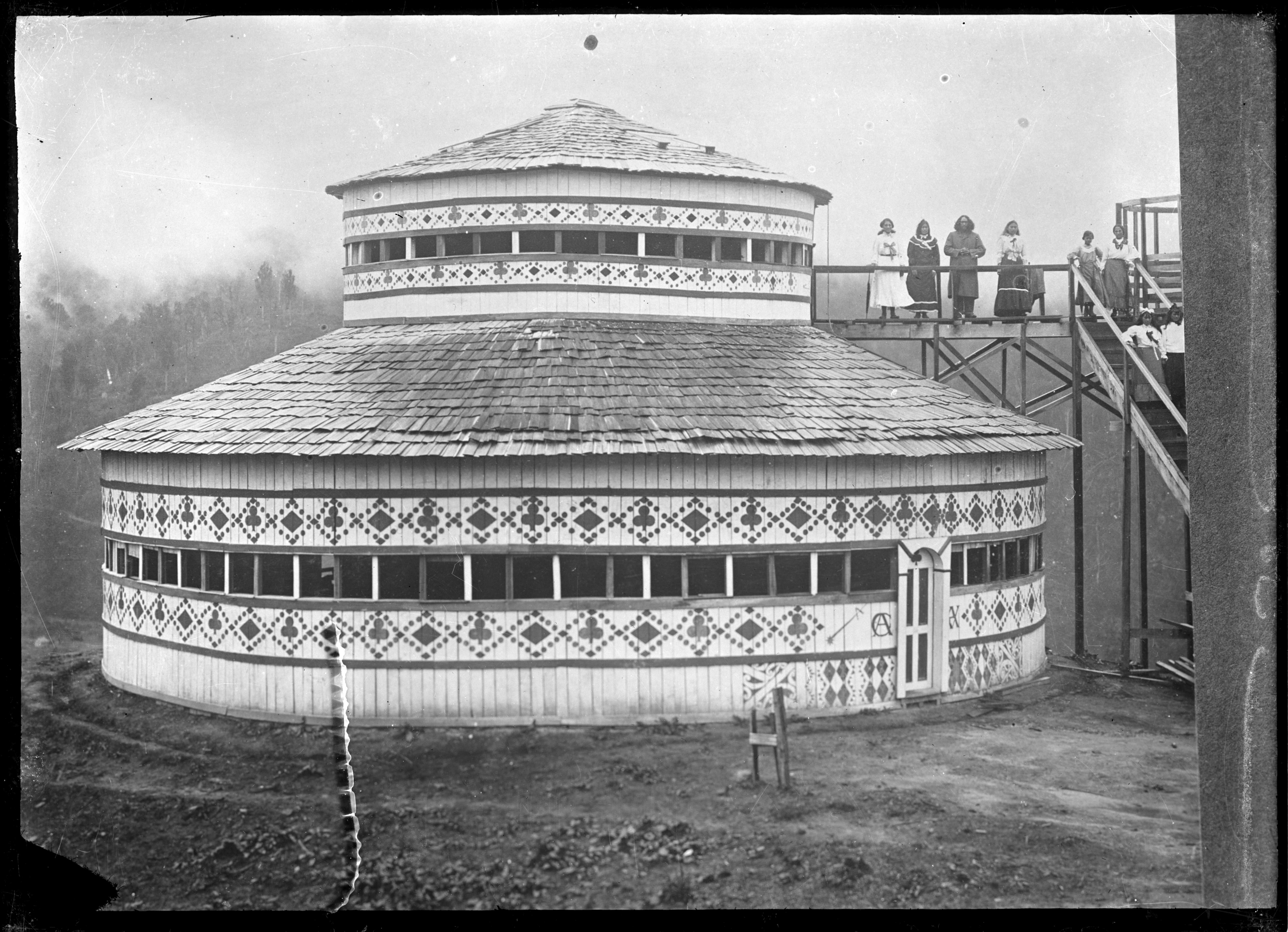
Rua Kenana Hepetipa's circular meeting house at Maungapohatu, circa 1908

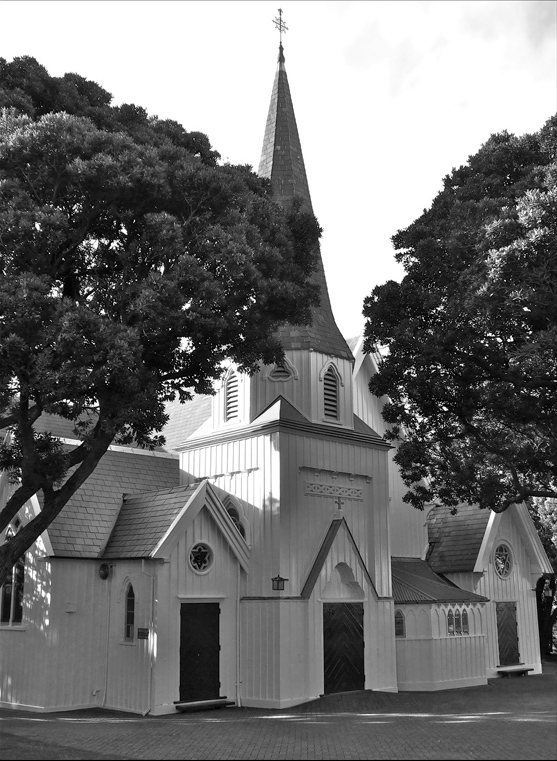
Old St Paul's cathedral opened June 1866

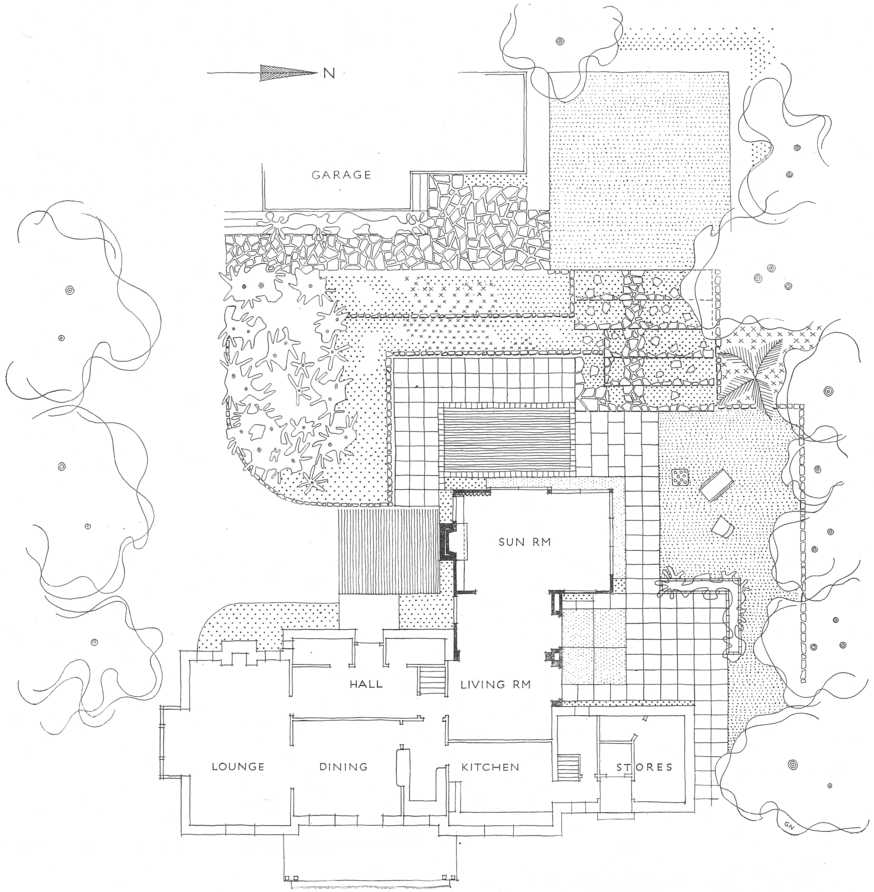
House plans designed by Ernst and Anna Plischke

In early 20th century, from 1901 to 1930, New Zealand architects is described as a neo-Classical period, notable architecture firms include Hoggard, Prouse and Gummer, Gummer and Ford, W. Gray Young and Cecil Wood.

The 1930s and 1940s was a time when suburbs were expanded with the building of many state houses, influenced by 'Britain's Garden City Cottage movement'. Also In early 1930s following the Great Depression, a modernist aesthetic was introduced to New Zealand, European architect Ernst Plischke was a part of this and his wife Anna Plischke brought her European training in landscapes to influence how building related to the outside space around them. American styles were also built, for example Californian Bungalow design of a single level wooden building with a verandah became very common.

The concrete and glass International style of architect entered the New Zealand built landscape in the 1950s and 1960s with many new government, institutional and commercial buildings in built this style including in the brutalist style. The postwar architects of Christchurch responded to modernism and brutalism with the emergence of Christchurch School in the late 1950s, considered New Zealand's only indigenous architectural vernacular to date.

=== Ecclesiastical architecture ===
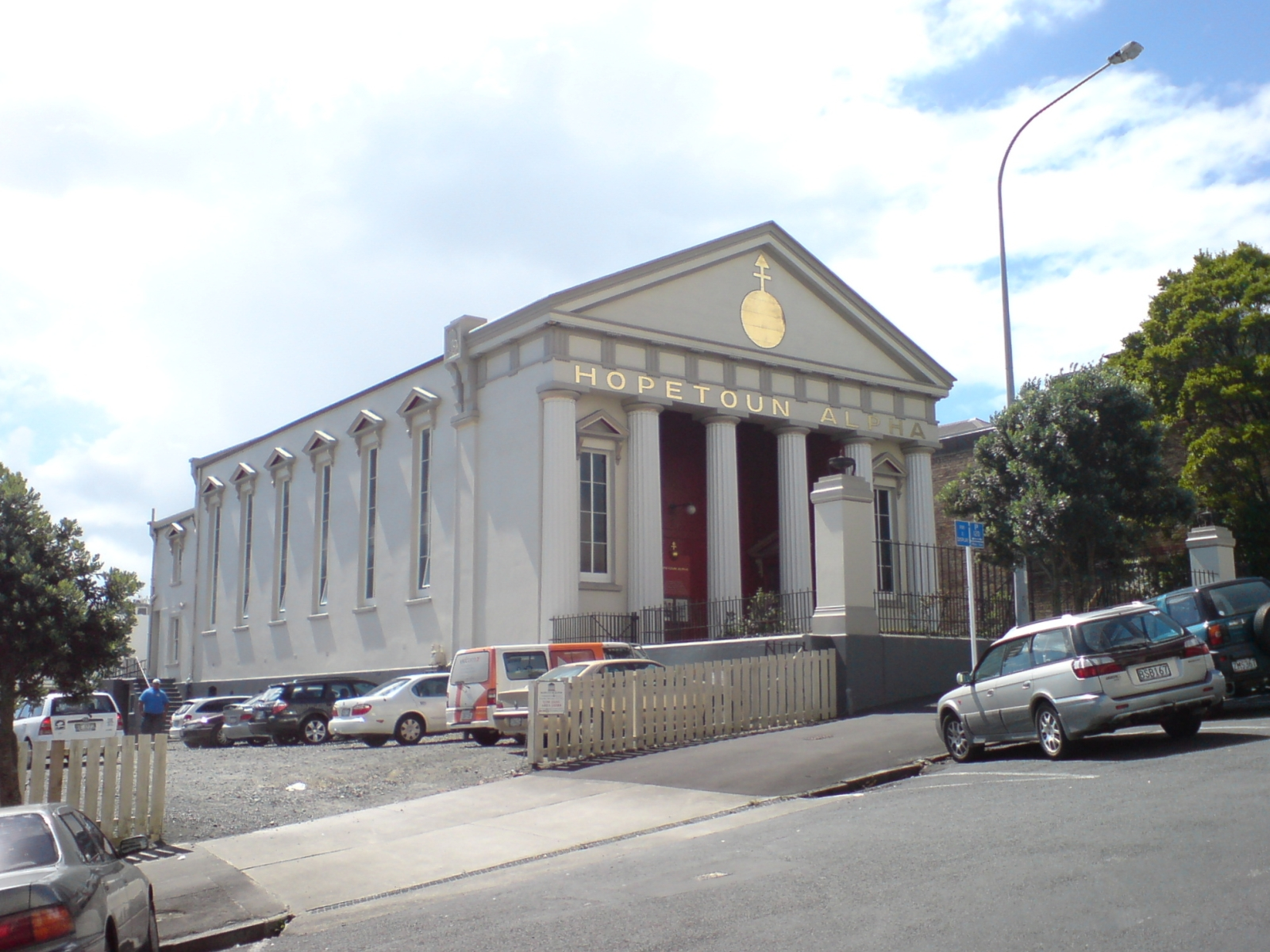
The Beresford Street Congregational Church was the first Grecian building in Auckland and was controversial at the time.

The predominant style for churches in New Zealand was Gothic; however, some aligned with Charles Haddon Spurgeon's view that classical architecture was the most appropriate style due to Greek being the language of the New Testament. Non-conformists were more likely to align with this view with the Auckland Baptist Tabernacle and Beresford Street Congregational Church being notable examples.

=== Effects of the 1931 Hawke's Bay earthquake ===
On 3 February 1931, most of the buildings in Napier were destroyed in an earthquake. Most of the rebuilt buildings were in the Art Deco style leading to Napier having one of the greatest concentrations of Art Deco architecture anywhere in the world.

=== South Island developments ===
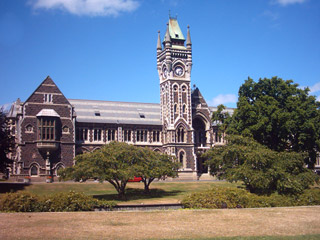
University of Otago Registry Building

Many of the more imposing structures in and around Dunedin and Christchurch were built in the latter part of the 19th century as a result of the economic boom following the Otago gold rush. A common style for these landmarks is the use of dark basalt blocks and facings of cream-coloured Oamaru stone, a form of limestone mined at Weston in North Otago. Notable buildings in this style include Dunedin Railway Station, the University of Otago Registry Building, Christchurch Arts Centre, Knox Church, Dunedin, Christ Church Cathedral, Christchurch, Christ's College, Christchurch, parts of the Canterbury Provincial Council Buildings and Otago Boys' High School. Several more recent buildings have mimicked this style by using brick in place of basalt, but using lighter stone facings in an identical style to the older structures. Notable among these buildings are Otago Girls' High School and the Timaru Basilica. This region was able to call upon the talents of many fine architects during this period, among them Robert Lawson, Francis Petre, Benjamin Mountfort, and George Troup.

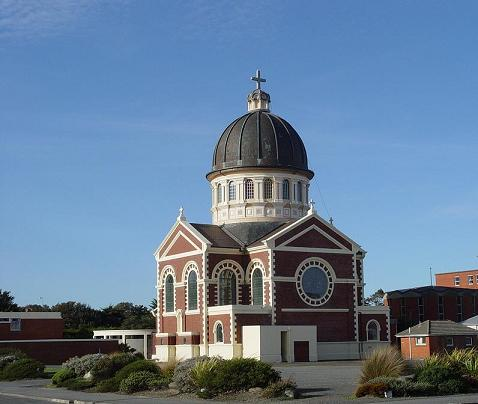
The St Mary's Basilica in Invercargill was designed by Francis Petre, a renowned New Zealand architect.

Oamaru stone, despite its susceptibility to the elements, is used as a major construction material on several fine buildings, most obviously in the town of Oamaru itself. The historic sector of this town contains numerous fine buildings built in this creamy stone, among them the Forrester Gallery and Waitaki District Council building. Waitaki Boys' High School is also a prime example of the use of Oamaru stone architecture.

Otago town of Ranfurly, which expanded during the 1930s, is also noted for its Art Deco architecture.

==== Effects of the 2010–11 Canterbury earthquakes ====
Christchurch and the Canterbury Region suffered from damage to numerous heritage buildings as a result of the earthquakes in September 2010 and February and June 2011.

== Architectural education and registration ==
The earliest known public lecture on architecture in New Zealand was by Edward Ashworth on Grecian architecture at the Auckland Mechanics' Institute.

Up until the mid 1920s architects in New Zealand were trained overseas, typically in the British Isles but some trained in Denmark and Germany. (Note: Germany in this context refers to German speaking states not the modern country)

Otago Polytechnic,Victoria University of Wellington, Unitec, Auckland University of Technology (AUT) and the University of Auckland train future architects.

=== Registered Architects ===
Registered Architects in New Zealand are authorised by the New Zealand Registered Architects Board through the Registered Architects Act 2005. Other people can design buildings but there are some things only Registered Architects can do. The registration process requires people to have at least a Masters qualification and a body of work.

== Organisations ==
- Architecture + Women NZ, New Zealand's professional organisation of women in architecture.
- Heritage New Zealand, a non-profit autonomous Crown entity, was set up through the Historic Places Act 1954 as the New Zealand Historic Places Trust to protect New Zealand's historical and cultural heritage including notable buildings.
- New Zealand Institute of Architects is a professional organisation that promotes architects and provides services to its membership. Not all New Zealand architects are members of the NZIA. Members pay an annual subscription.
- New Zealand Registered Architects Board is a statutory board that assesses, registers and monitors architects in New Zealand.Wellington Architectural Centre
- SAHANZ (Society of Architectural Historians, Australia and New Zealand)

== Gallery ==
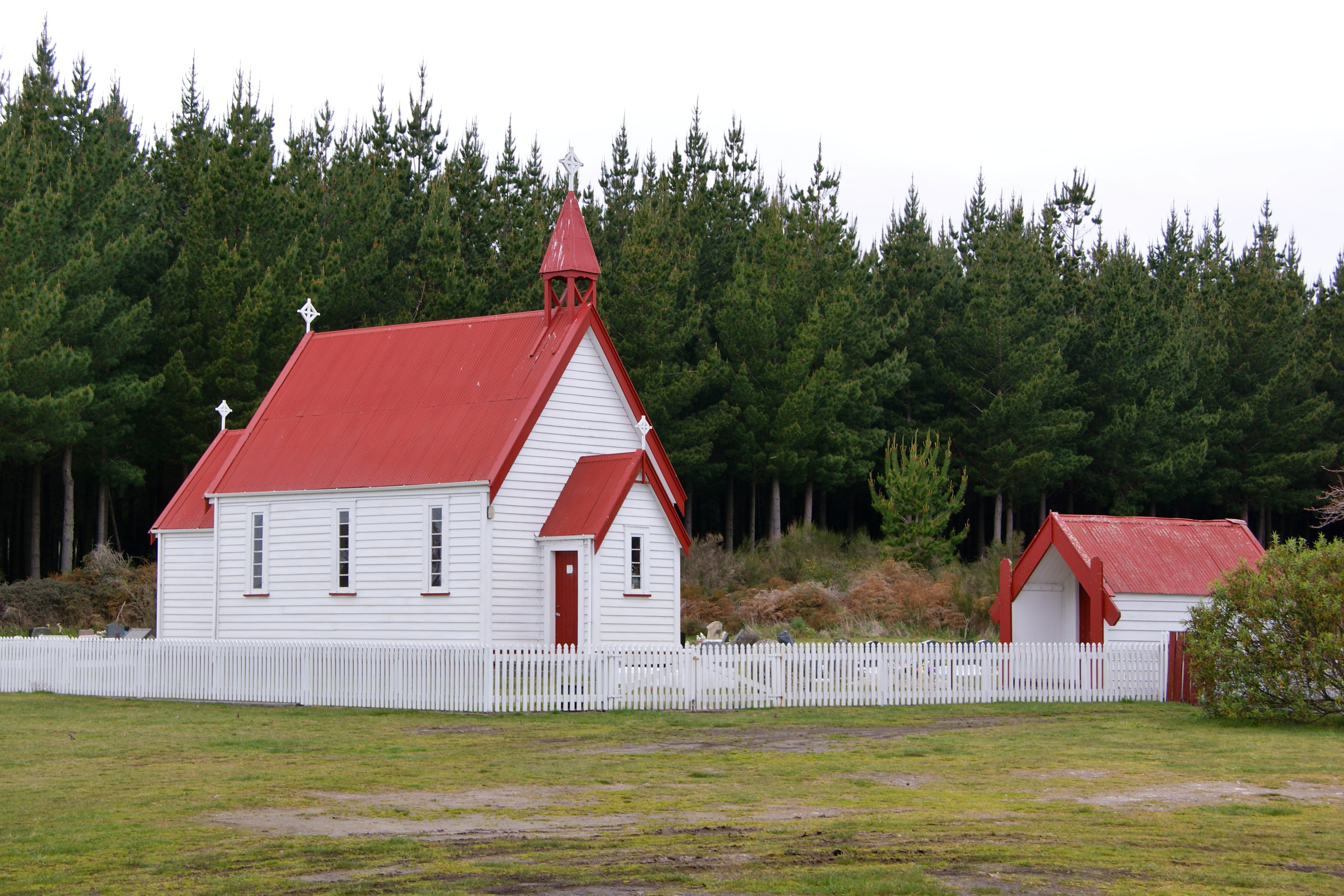
Waitetoko Church, near Lake Taupō

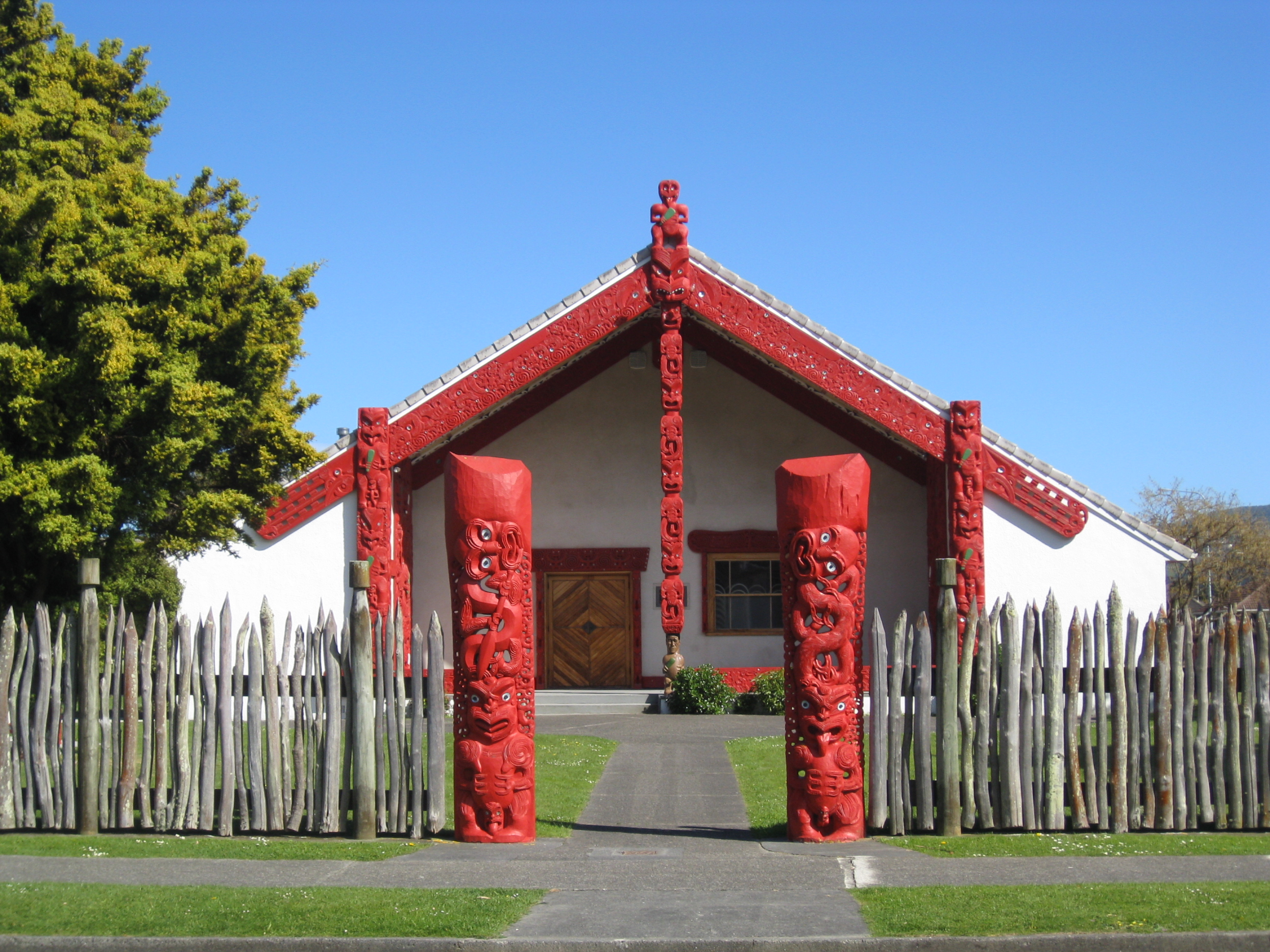
Waiwhetū marae

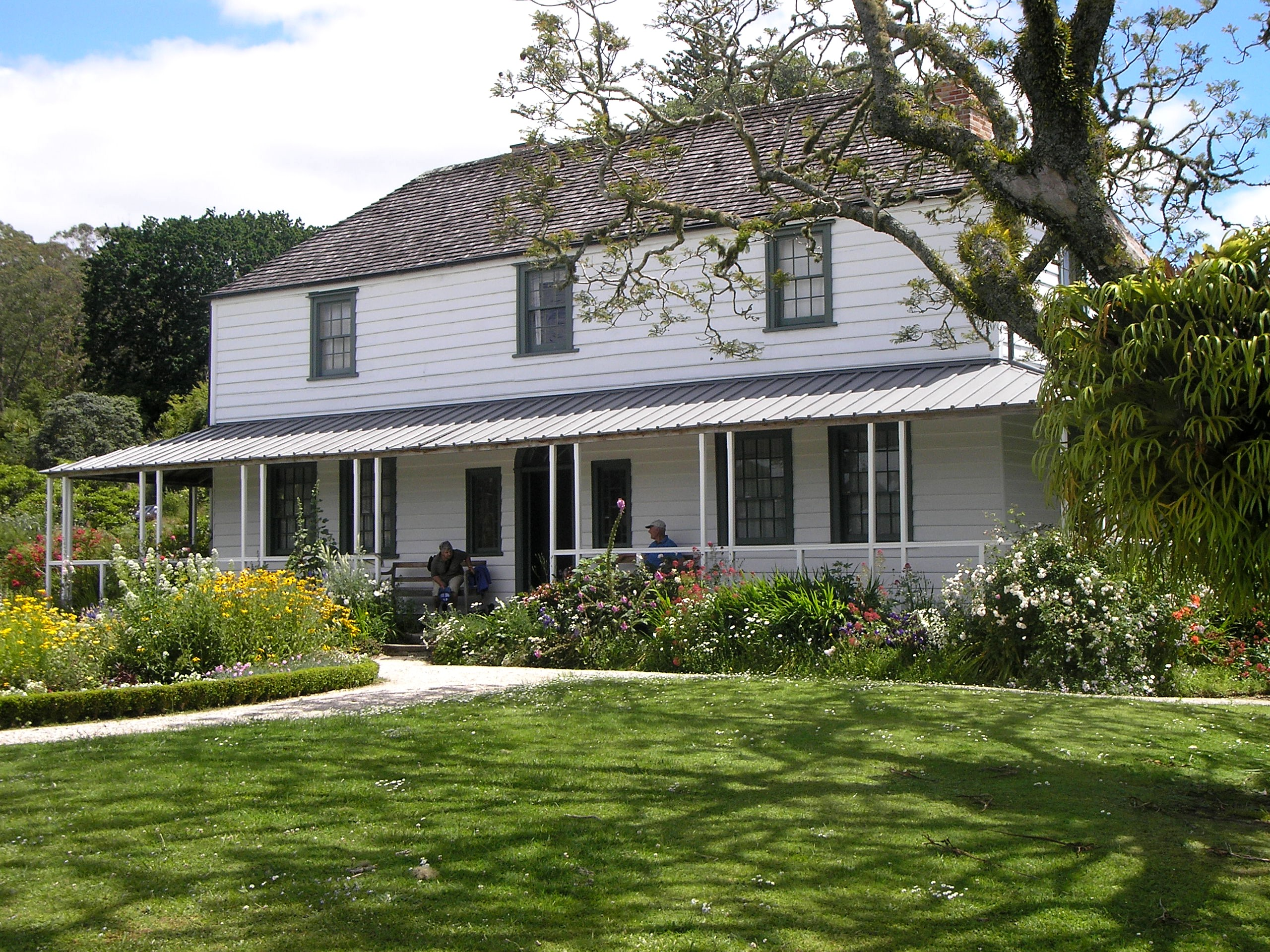
Kerikeri Mission House

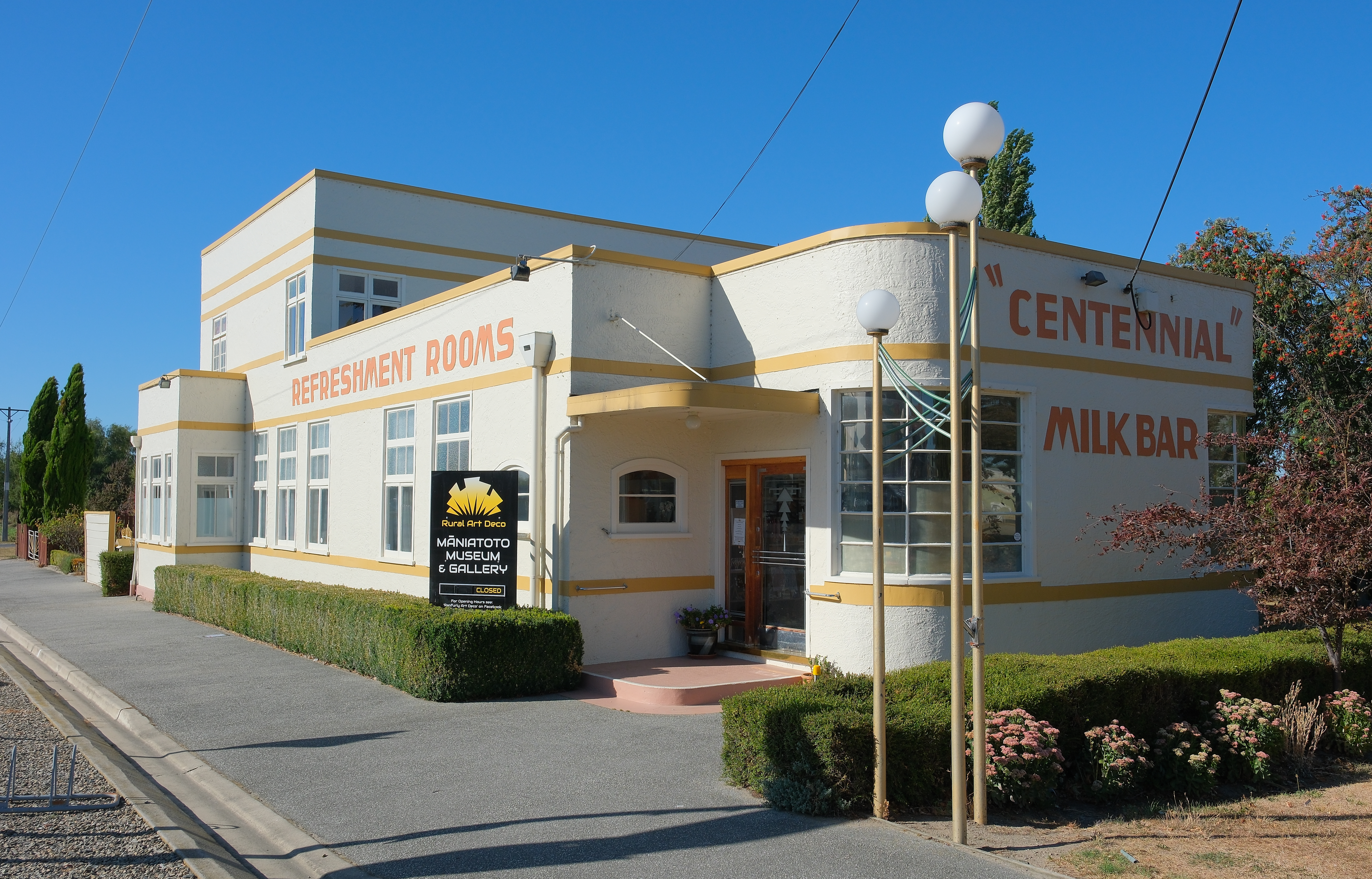
An art deco building in Ranfurly, near Otago

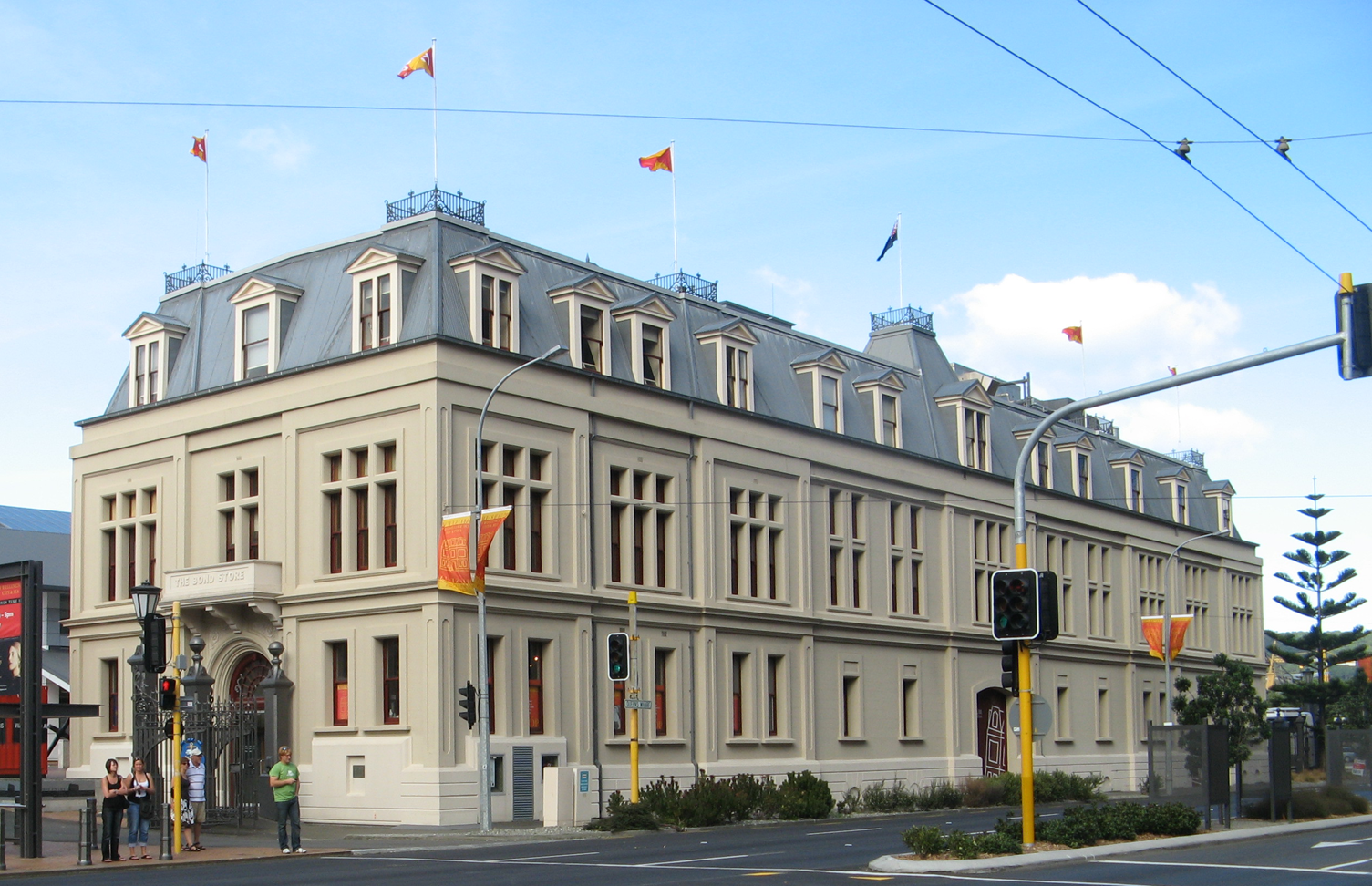
The Wellington Harbour Board Head Office and Bond Store

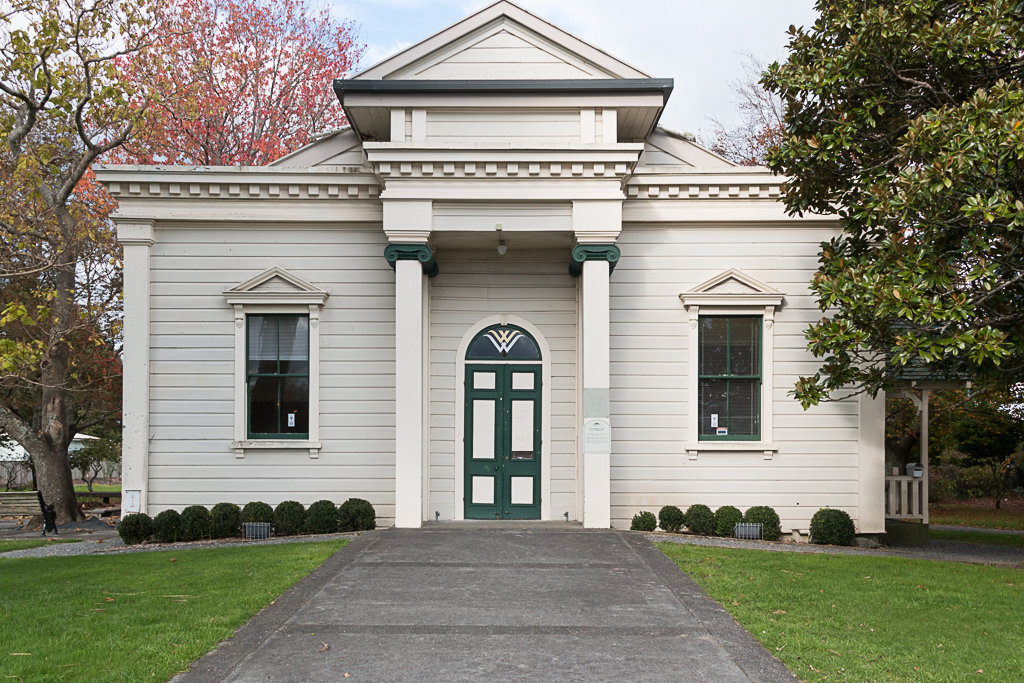
Greytown First Masonic Hall

== See also ==
- List of New Zealand architects
- Housing in New Zealand
- Culture of New Zealand
- New Zealand performing arts venues
- Australasian Student Architecture Congress
