= Design Review (journal) =

- Discipline: Architecture
- Language: English

Publication details
- Former name: New Zealand Design Review
- History: 1948–1954
- Publisher: Architectural Centre Incorporated, Wellington (New Zealand)
- Frequency: Bimonthly

Standard abbreviations
- ISO 4: Des. Rev.

Links
- Online access

Design Review (originally titled New Zealand Design Review) is the journal of the Architectural Centre Incorporated, Wellington. The centre was founded in 1946, and began the first architectural school in Wellington (1947) and the first town planning school in New Zealand (1949). The centre was unique at the time of its founding in that it invited members interested in a broad range of design and the arts, rather than restricting membership to professional architects and architectural students. Internationally, it is one of the oldest organisations of its type.

== Philosophy and Scope ==
The centre began the two-monthly publication of New Zealand Design Review in 1948. The journal addressed design topics as broad as furniture, town planning, theatre and stage design, packaging, church design, book-binding, poster design, industrial design and of course architecture. It hence reflected the centre's interest in architecture, design and the arts in the broadest sense and was the first journal of its kind in New Zealand. The editorial of April – May 1949 explicitly asked the question "What is Design?", answering it with:

Like everything that has to do with the arts, design cannot be tested for its quality in a laboratory ... The elusive quality that a consensus of opinion agrees to call good design is not to be defined in terms like an axiom in geometry ... So we will leave the making of formulas and rules to those who like that sort of thing ... we shall publish in each number a discussion on some particular object; a house, a chair, a teapot or what have you. The contributor will tell you his or her opinion about the merits or demerits of the way that thing is designed, omitting any waving of the big stick to lay down laws of design. It is for you to decide if you think they are right."

== Contributors ==
Contributors included E. C. Simpson, Doreen Blumhardt, Helen Hitchings, E. H. McCormick, Odo Strewe, William Toomath, Gordon Wilson, Anna Plischke, Geoff Nees, film maker John O'Shea, writer Alan Mulgan, and photographers John Pascoe and Irene Koppel. Editors of the journal included architects Ernst Plischke, Maurice Patience, and Al Gabites, and well-known artists E. Mervyn Taylor, and Eric Lee-Johnson. The final issue of Design Review was published in 1954.

== Digitisation ==
The entire journal has been digitised by the New Zealand Electronic Text Centre, a unit of the library at Victoria University of Wellington, and can be viewed online.
