= Berhampore State Flats =

Historic accommodation units in Wellington, New Zealand

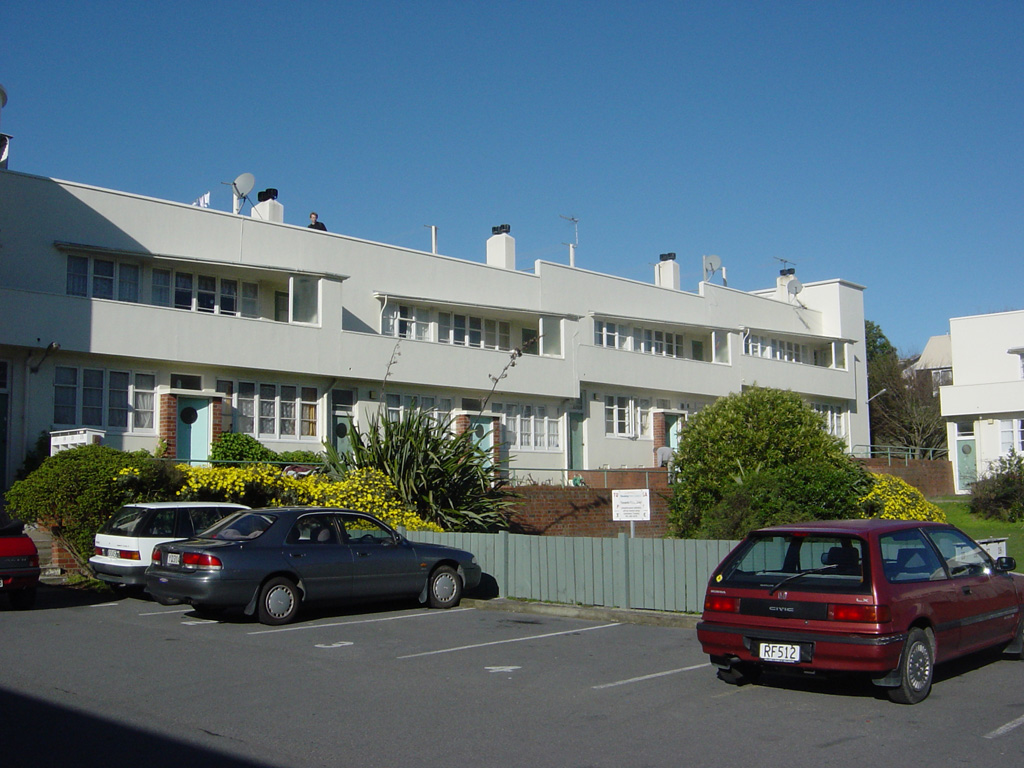
- Berhampore State Flats in 2005
- Interactive map of the Berhampore State Flats area

General information
- Architectural style: International Style
- Location: 493 Adelaide Road; Berhampore; Wellington 6023; New Zealand
- Coordinates: 41.32161°S 174.77583°E
- Construction started: 1938
- Completed: 1939
- Renovated: 1987
- Client: New Zealand Government

Design and construction
- Architect: F. Gordon Wilson

Heritage New Zealand – Category 1
- Designated: 28 August 1998
- Reference no.: 7432

The Berhampore State Flats (also known as the Centennial Flats) at 493–507 Adelaide Road, Berhampore, Wellington, New Zealand, are an example of mass housing designed in the international style. The flats were designed by F. Gordon Wilson, chief architect at the Department of Housing Construction.

== Context ==
The New Zealand government had first become involved in the provision of housing when the Workers' Dwelling Act, which allowed the state to build and lease houses to workers, was passed in 1905. However, only after the election of the First Labour Government in 1935 was there large-scale state involvement in the New Zealand housing market. One of many measures that was undertaken by the First Labour Government was the launch of a state housing scheme to provide every New Zealander with a home that, in Walter Nash's words, would be "fit for a cabinet minister". The Department of Housing Construction, with its own architects, was established, and by 1940 almost 10,000 new single-unit dwellings had been constructed.

In March 1938, the government announced the construction of the first block of multi-unit flats, at Berhampore. Although single-unit dwellings had been preferred, the government felt that the housing problem was of such magnitude that every approach should be encouraged, and that advances in multi-unit complexes were such that they had become more socially acceptable.

The location of the flats, a short tram ride from Courtenay Place, was intended to give convenient access to the tenants' workplaces, and reduce urban sprawl.

== Architecture ==
The scheme consisted of 48 one-, two- or three-bedroom units and 11 garages, planned to maximise open spaces. Particular attention was paid to maximizing sunlight, with the buildings on the northern side being limited to one storey, living rooms built to the sun, windows as large as practicable and balconies included in all units above ground level. Other features were an emphasis on built-in services and consideration of sound insulation between the units. The complex included a community centre in the central garden area.

== Engineering ==
Reinforced-concrete construction mitigated earthquake and fire risks, and also resulted in reduced maintenance and construction costs.

== Construction and alterations ==
The Berhampore Flats were completed in 1938–39. Major renovations and alterations were carried out by the New Zealand Housing Corporation in 1987, but the original character of the scheme is still evident. The complex was given "Category I" historic place status by the New Zealand Historic Places Trust (now Heritage New Zealand) in 1998.
