= Nancy Bolton =

Australian-born New Zealand artist (1913–2008)

- Born: 1913; Sydney
- Died: 12 March 2008
- Education: Sydney Technical College

Nancy Martyr Bolton (also Nancy Parker and Nancy Sawer; 1913–2008) was an Australian artist and teacher, who also worked in New Zealand. She is known for her linocuts, lithographs and illustrations.

== Early life and education ==
Bolton was born in Sydney, Australia in 1913. She received her training at East Sydney Technical College (now National Art School), and worked as a commercial artist. Bolton married academic Robert Parker, and moved to Wellington in 1939 when he was appointed a senior lecturer in political science at Victoria University of Wellington. Kirkcaldie and Stains held an exhibition of Bolton's oils, watercolours and woodcuts (reported under the name Nancy Boulton) in 1941.

Bolton and Parker returned to Canberra in 1945, and then again to Wellington in 1949 when he was appointed full professor. By this time the couple had two children.

== Work ==
Bolton contributed illustrations to the New Zealand School Journal, and wrote articles for Art in New Zealand. Bolton's line-drawings have been described as "Alexander Calder-esque". Her linocut Botanical Gardens, Wellington was reproduced on the cover of Art in New Zealand in 1943. Bolton illustrated several children's books, and painted a mural on Wellington's modernist Dixon Street Flats.

Bolton held exhibitions at the A. M. Nicholas Studio in Canberra, and in 1955 at the Architectural Centre Gallery in Wellington. Bolton's work is included in the collection at Te Papa Tongarewa.

Bolton's circa 1939 linocut Cable Car featured in a 2024 exhibition of New Zealand printmakers at Christchurch Art Gallery. The print "powerfully conveys the scene from inside a tunnel to the daylight beyond. Sunlight hitting the shining tracks creates the perfect viewpoint into the distance further up the hill. It’s an astonishingly simple and economic use of black and white."

== Later life ==
In 1971 Bolton married Australian jurist Geoffrey Sawer. At this time, Bolton was teaching at Canberra Grammar School, and was about to hold an exhibition of paintings titled "Houses and Balconies". She was a book reviewer for The Canberra Times. Bolton died in 2008.
