= Gordon Wilson Flats =

Derelict historic accommodation building in Wellington, New Zealand

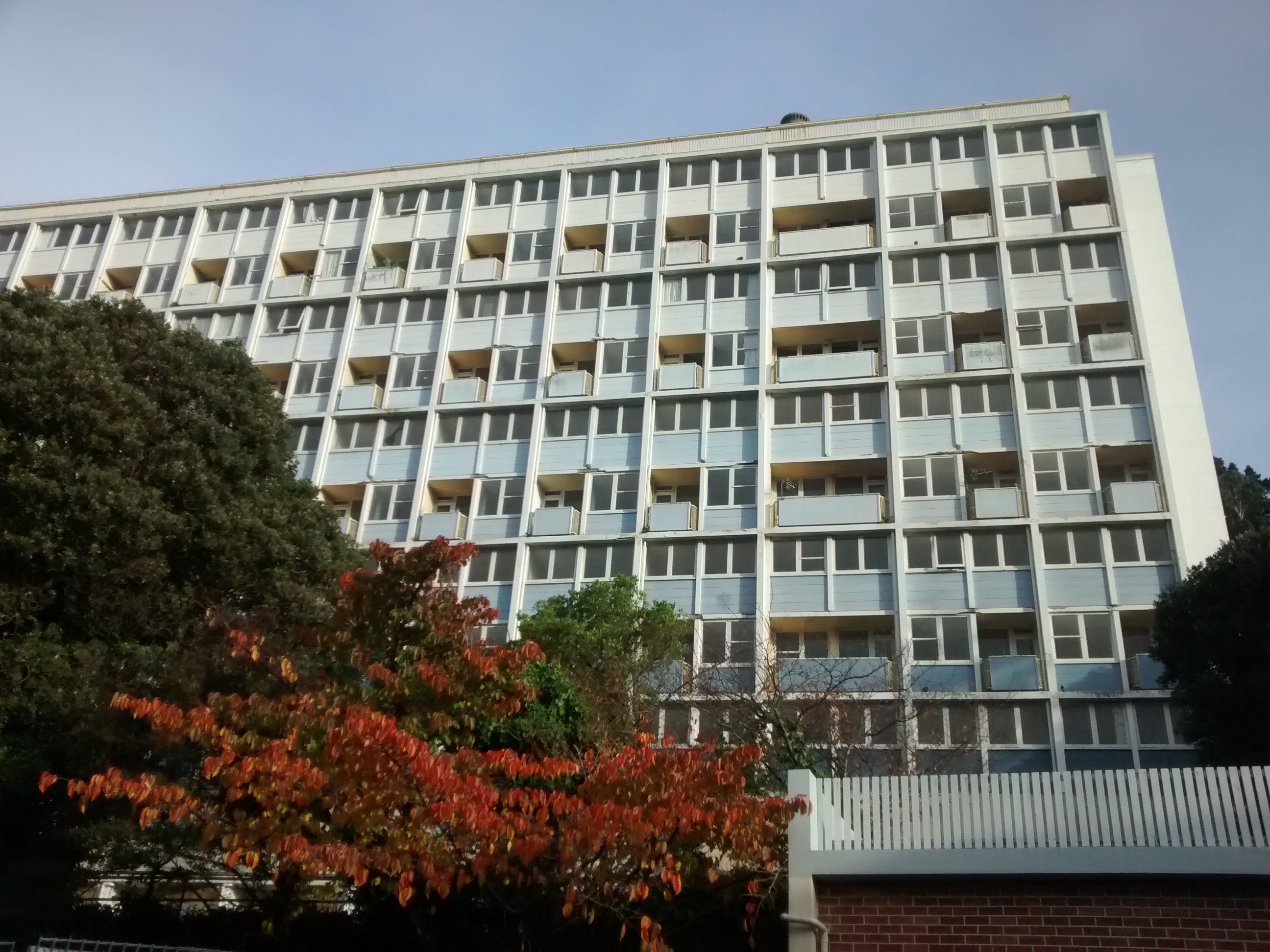
- The flats in 2015

General information
- Location: 320 The Terrace, Wellington, New Zealand
- Coordinates: 41°17′28″S 174°46′13″E
- Named for: Gordon Wilson
- Completed: 1959
- Closed: 2012
- Owner: Victoria University of Wellington

Gordon Wilson Flats is a residential building in central Wellington, completed in 1959. The building was owned by Housing New Zealand and housed 131 people. It is currently owned by Victoria University of Wellington and was unoccupied prior to its demolition.

On 17 June 2025, the National government said it would remove the flats' heritage protected status by way of specific legislation, paving the way for demolition by the owners. Demolition began in 2026.

Originally known as The Terrace Flats, it was renamed in honour of government architect Gordon Wilson who died in its final year of construction.

== Use as social housing: 1959–2013 ==
The foundation stone for the building was laid on 6 August 1957, with completion in 1959. The flats gave practical expression to the perceived obligation of central government to provide social welfare in the form of affordable housing for lower-paid citizens. Its 11 storeys accommodated 12 bed-sitting rooms on the ground floor with 75 maisonettes above, housing a total of 131 inhabitants.

=== Earthquake assessment ===
An engineering firm first reported concerns about the building in April 2010. A later assessment determined that a large person falling on a balcony could cause masonry façades to fall off the building. Housing New Zealand was more concerned about strong wind or an earthquake event, however, and decided to relocate tenants to avoid any problems. "The building is corroding, so it's a progressive deterioration," HNZ assets development general manager Sean Bignell said.

== Vacancy, sale and demolition ==
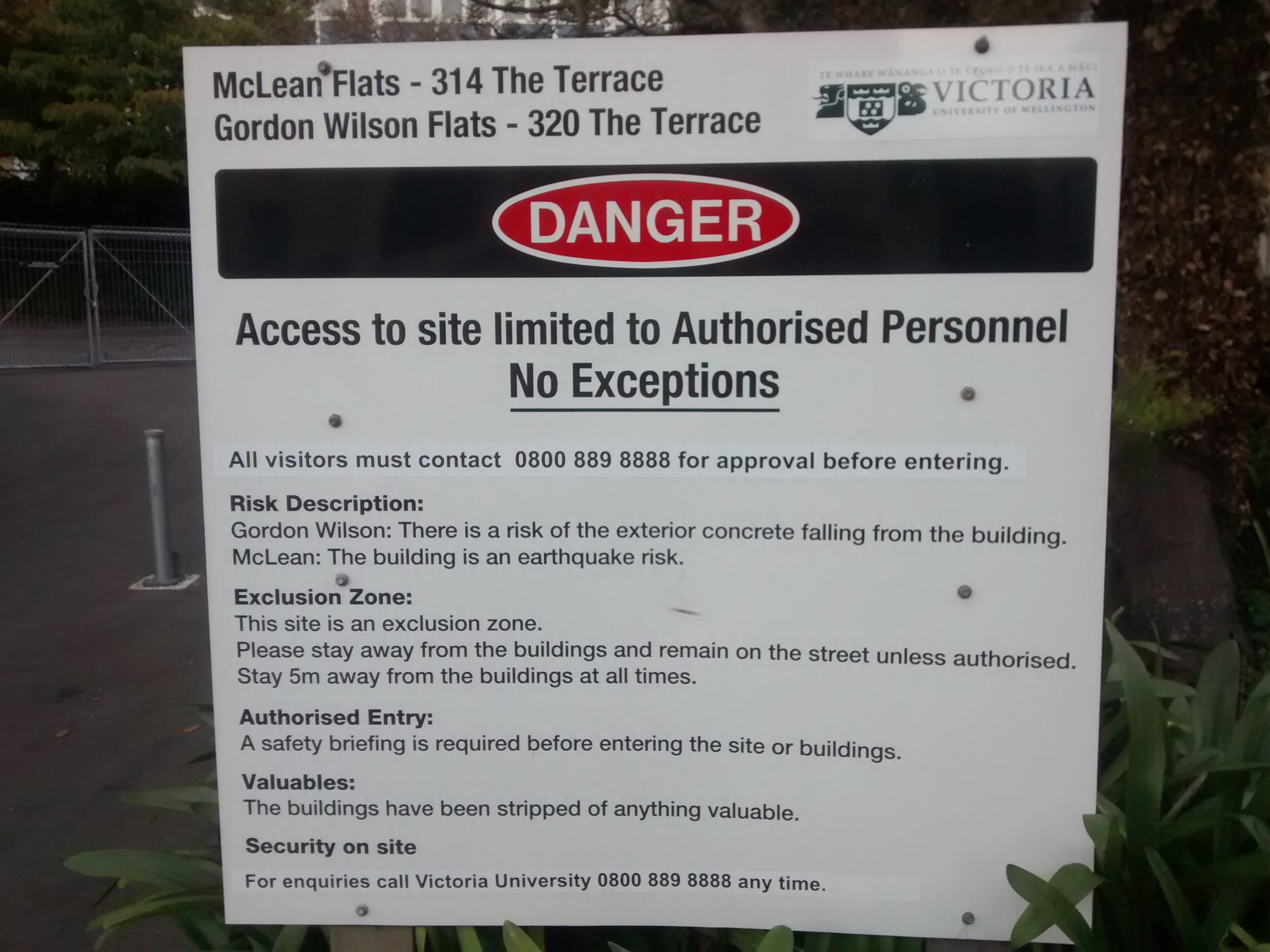
The danger sign outside the Gordon Wilson Flats on the Terrace

Tenants had to leave the flats in May 2012, after Housing New Zealand had serious doubts about the building's structural integrity and safety. Tenants were only given seven days notice to leave, a move which was criticised by some MPs, who pointed out the lack of other options for ex-tenants, especially at such short notice. Some tenants said they found the process very stressful, particularly given many of the residents had health problems or were refugees who did not speak English well.

At the time Housing New Zealand moved tenants out of the building, the organisation said it was determining what to do with the building, and said no decisions had yet been made about its future. Their regional tenancy manager said at the time: "Wellington has a high demand for housing. Our preference is to upgrade the building".

In January 2014, Wellington MP Grant Robertson sought assurances that it would remain as social housing, and said he was worried it would be sold off rather than redeveloped. Housing advocates also pointed out that there was a shortage of social housing in Wellington, especially given the temporary closure of a number of housing complexes for earthquake strengthening.

=== Sale to Victoria University, removal of heritage listing, and demolition ===
In February 2014, Radio New Zealand reported that Housing New Zealand was in negotiations to sell the flats to Victoria University of Wellington. Neither party to the negotiations would comment. Wellington MP Grant Robertson said he was worried social housing was being driven out of the central city.

In September 2014, it was announced that Victoria University of Wellington would purchase the building. The university bought the building because of its proximity to its Kelburn campus, and the potential for it to provide a link between the Terrace and Wai-te-ata Road. The Vice-Chancellor of Victoria University, Grant Guilford, said that the university was in the process of making a decision about whether to demolish the building in consultation with the community. He commented that:

If the consensus of the community was that the building shouldn't be there, it would certainly suit our views.

It was subsequently revealed that the purchase price was over $6 million.

In July 2015, Urban Perspectives Limited, on behalf of Victoria University, lodged an application with Wellington City Council to rezone the area from "Inner Residential Area" to "Institutional Precinct", remove the Flats from the City District Plan’s heritage list, and amend the Institutional Precinct provisions of the District Plan.

Evidence presented to the Wellington City Council panel by an architectural historian noted the architectural significance of the flats:

The Gordon Wilson Flats have exceptional architectural significance. Not only are they associated with F. Gordon Wilson, one of the most prominent, powerful and influential architects in New Zealand from the 1930s through to the 1950s but they are the last of a line of highly important high rise social housing projects built by the state. They were initiated by the first Labour Government of 1935 and they reflect and have a direct connection with international modernism.

In April 2016, a Wellington City Council panel approved the rezoning of the flats, allowing Victoria University to demolish the building and build anything – possibly student accommodation. The media reported that the prospect of noisy student accommodation worried neighbours.

In July 2016, the Architectural Centre lodged an appeal in the Environment Court against the Wellington City Council's decision to remove the Gordon Wilson flats' heritage status under Wellington's District Plan. The appeal was successful with the court determining that the heritage listing should stand in August 2017.

In July 2020, the University revealed plans to rezone the site for institutional use, and to demolish the flats in favour of a development including an 'outdoor entrance plaza and new teaching and research facilities'. The new design was to be called Te Huanui, which the university called "a great opportunity for positive inner-city development."

In February 2021, the flats were listed by Heritage New Zealand as a category 1 historic place, meaning any plans to develop the site would need Environment Court approval. Plans for Te Huanui have been "put on hold" since that time.

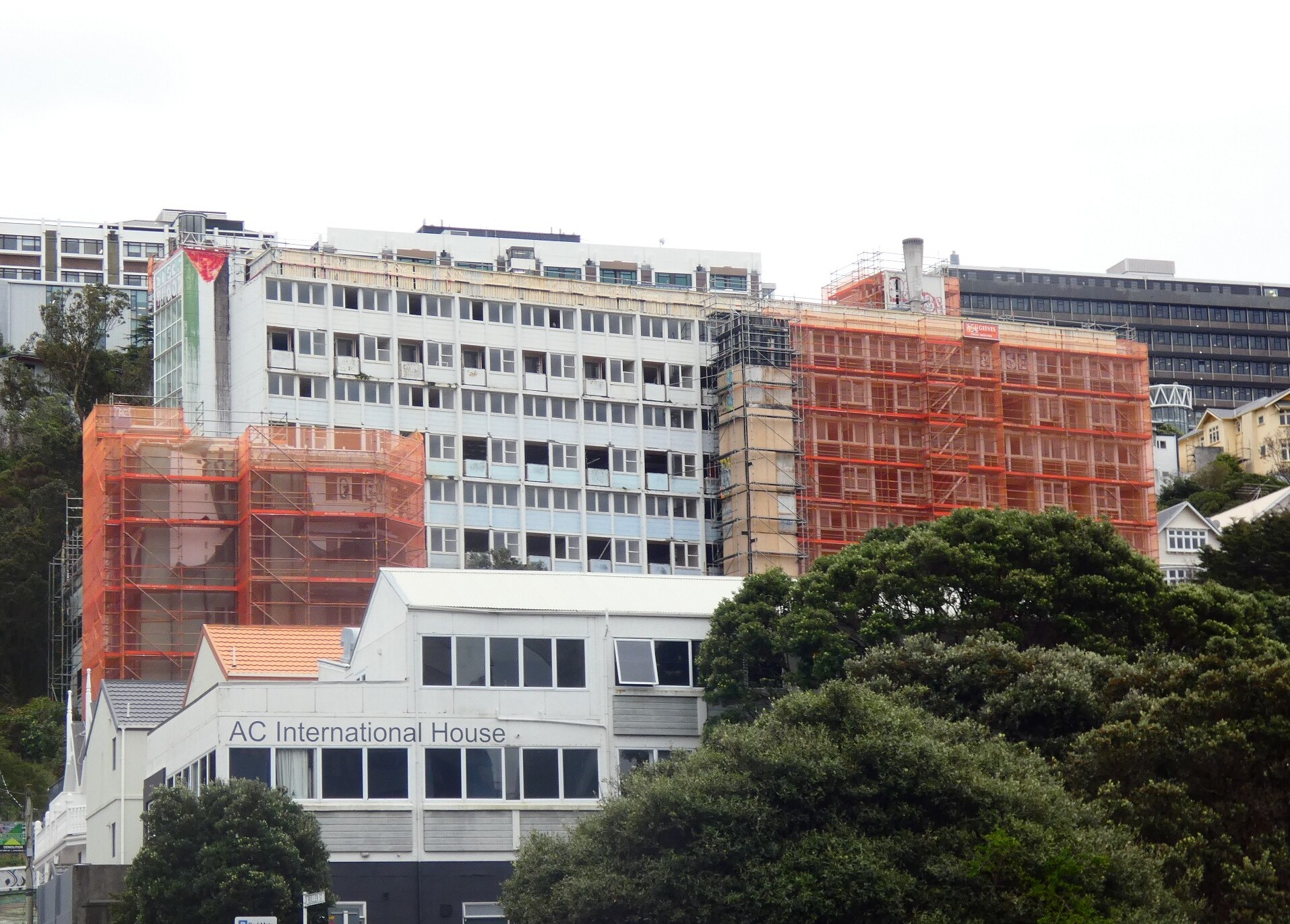
Gordon Wilson Flats and McLean Flats being demolished in June 2026

In March 2024, the Wellington City Council voted to remove the heritage designation from the Gordon Wilson flats in an update of the district plan. As a result of law changes leading to the National Policy Statement on Urban Development, the council's decisions in updated district plans cannot be appealed to the Environment Court. The updated district plan only requires approval from the Housing Minister, Chris Bishop.

On 17 June 2025, the National government said it would remove the flats' heritage protected status by way of specific legislation, paving the way for demolition by the owners. In December 2025, Victoria University confirmed that demolition would begin later that month. Demolition work begun in February 2026 and was expected to take 12 months.

It was confirmed in April 2026 that Victoria University has budgeted $7.25m for the demolition work, which is set to continue until early 2027.
