= Dixon Street Flats =

Historic accommodation building in Wellington, New Zealand

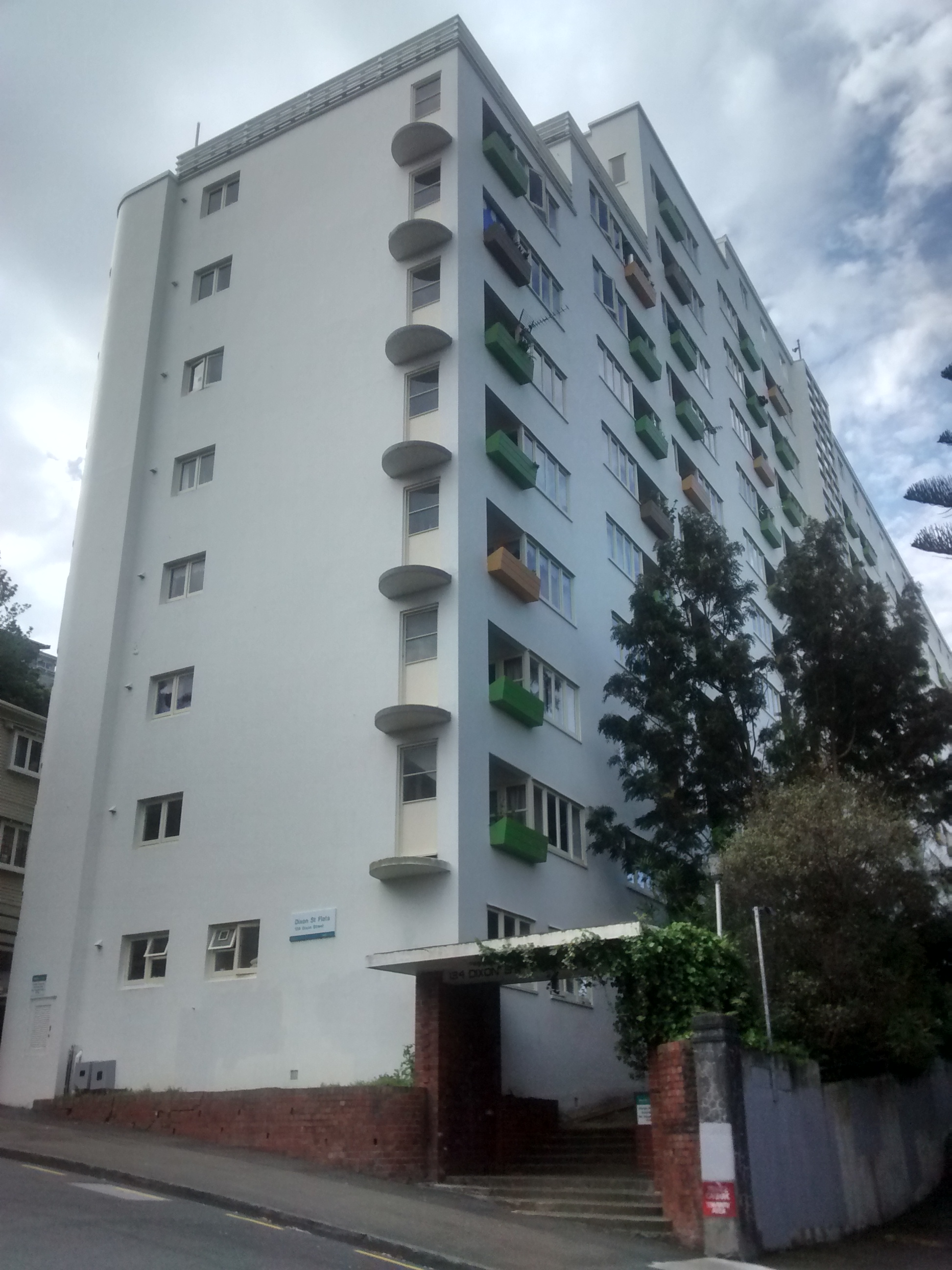
- The flats in 2014

General information
- Architectural style: Modernist
- Location: 134 Dixon Street, Wellington, New Zealand
- Coordinates: 41.290503°S 174.773034°E
- Completed: 1944 (1947 in Kernohan)

Height
- Height: 30.5 m (100 ft)

Technical details
- Floor count: 10

Design and construction
- Architects: Housing Construction Department (Gordon Wilson and Ernst Plischke)
- Awards: NZIA Gold Medal 1947

Heritage New Zealand – Category 1
- Designated: 27-Jun-1997
- Reference no.: 7395

Dixon Street Flats is a historic building in Wellington, New Zealand, designed by the Housing Division of the Ministry of Works. It is on Dixon Street.

== History ==
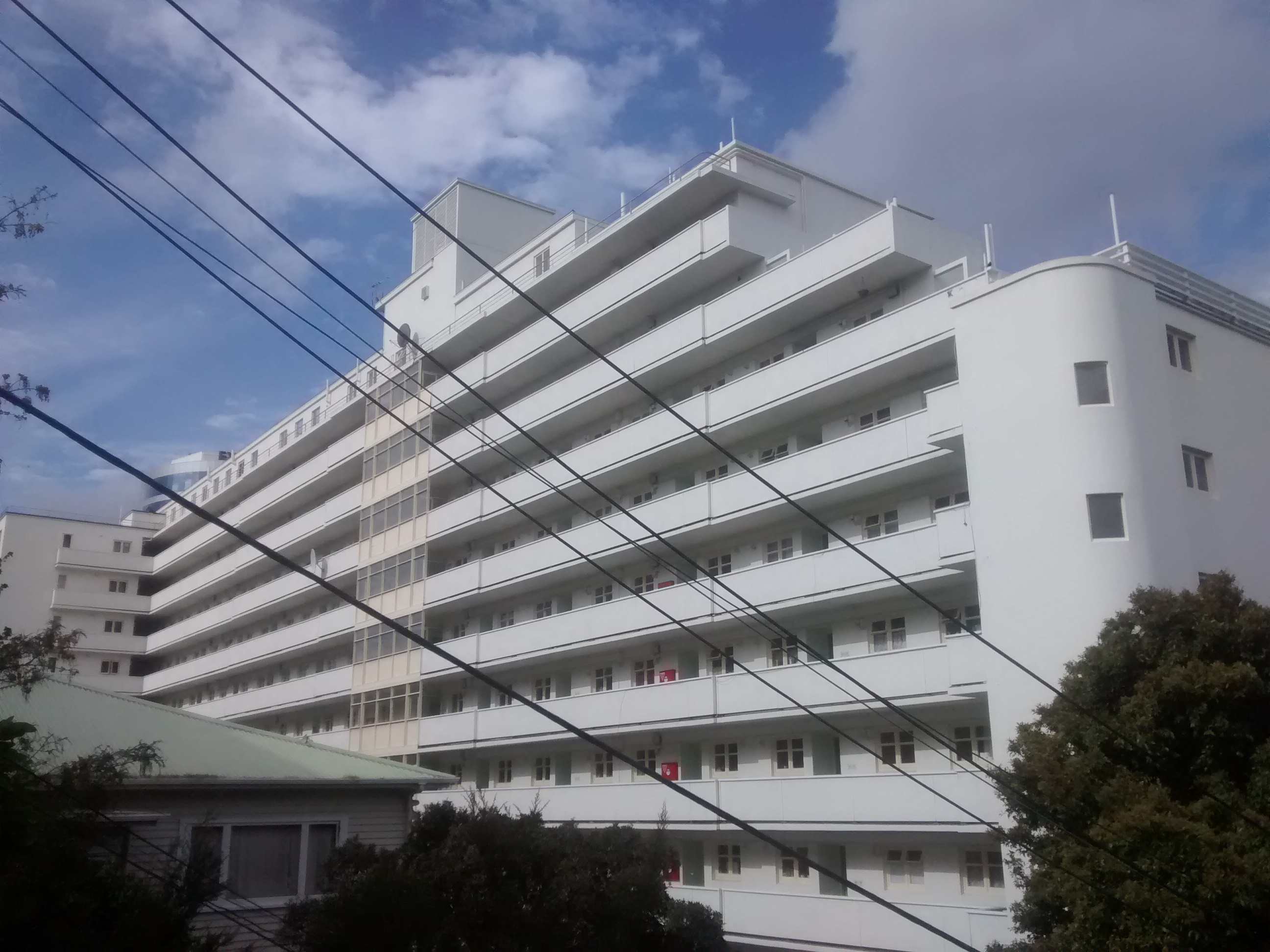
The Flats from halfway up the Dixon Street steps

The Dixon Street Flats in central Wellington were completed in 1944 as part of the first Labour Government's state housing program. They were designed by the chief architect of the Department of Housing Construction Gordon Wilson. The Austrian-born architect Ernst Plischke was employed by the Department of Housing Construction at the time of the design and is popularly thought to have had considerable influence over the Dixon Street design, even though there is no documentary evidence to support this.

The building was officially opened on 4 September 1943, six months before it was completed, because a general election was coming up and the flats were good publicity for the Labour Party's election campaign. The flats were originally intended to house single women and retired couples, but by 1943 many soldiers were returning from war service and getting married, so it was decided to give them preference. Ten stories high, the building contained 115 one-bedroom flats plus a two-bedroom caretaker's flat. At the official opening the Minister of Works commented on features that were notable at the time: provision of privacy, sunlight and soundproofing. The flats were also to be wired up for radio reception, with an aerial connection in each home. The building featured a mural by Australian artist Nancy Bolton.

The building was awarded the NZIA gold medal in 1947. It is considered to be the archetype of Modernist apartment blocks in New Zealand. The building was the first major high-rise building and first major apartment block to be completed in Wellington after the Second World War.

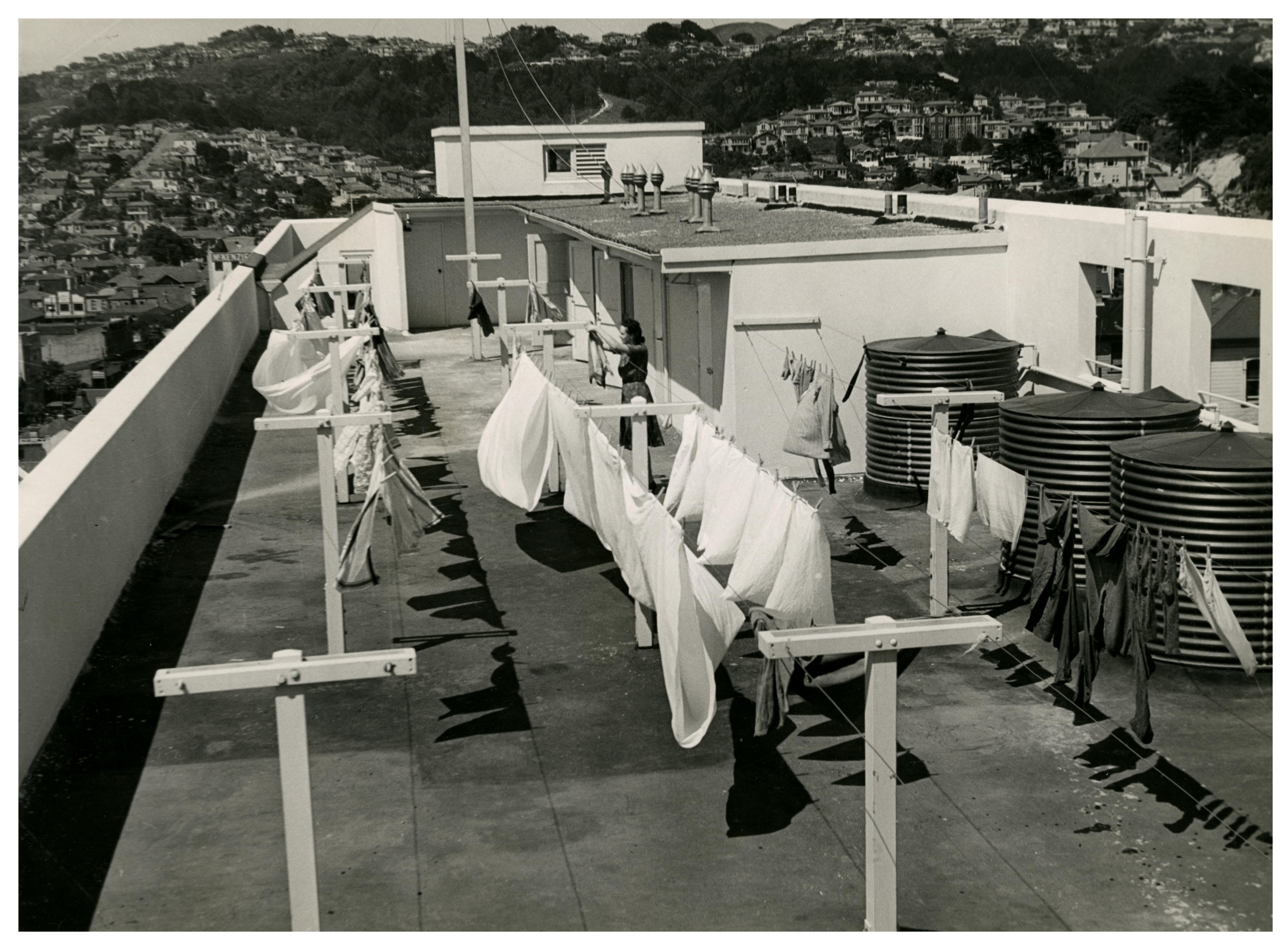
A woman drying washing on the roof of the flats (around 1940s)

In 1982 the Housing Corporation undertook a $4 million renovation of the building, improving kitchens and bathrooms and building a laundry and social area on the roof.

The building was classified in 1997 as a "Category 1" ("places of special or outstanding historical or cultural heritage significance or value") historic place by Heritage New Zealand.

In 2016, after an elderly resident died and was not found for two weeks, Housing New Zealand, in conjunction with the Presbyterian church in Wellington, started providing a weekly drop-in for cups of tea to help build a community. Security cameras were installed and a security guard was stationed at the flats at all times to deal with antisocial behaviour by some residents and their visitors. Another resident lay dead and undiscovered for weeks in 2021.

In 2022 Kāinga Ora (successor to Housing New Zealand) produced a report on the flats which stated that the building was "at the end of its economic life". Due to its heritage listing it would be difficult to get permission to demolish the building, so Kāinga Ora's preferred plan was to renovate, which would mean moving all the residents out temporarily. Many of the tenants were "middle-aged, single, older, formerly homeless individuals".

By 2024, the flats were boarded up until further notice and the residents relocated, following concerns over the building's quake-prone status and Kāinga Ora's financial health.
