= Cedric Firth =

New Zealand builder, architect and writer

Cedric Harold Firth (22 May 1908–31 May 1994) was a New Zealand builder, architect and writer. He was born in Auckland City, Auckland Region, New Zealand on 22 May 1908.

From 1948 to 1959 he was in a partnership 'Plishke & Firth' with Ernst Plischke.
