= Gordon Wilson (architect) =

New Zealand government architect (1900–1959)

- Born: 27 November 1900; Perth, Western Australia
- Died: 23 February 1959 (aged 58); Wellington, New Zealand
- Occupation: Architect
- Spouse: Virginia Abigail Smith
- Buildings: Berhampore State Flats, Dixon Street Flats

Francis Gordon Wilson (27 November 1900 – 23 February 1959) was a New Zealand architect. Wilson oversaw the design of New Zealand’s state housing programme from the 1930s onwards. He was the New Zealand Government Architect at the time of his death.

== Early life and education ==
Wilson was born on 27 November 1900 in Subiaco, a district of Perth, Western Australia to Mary Catherine (nee O’Hagan) and Francis "Frank" John Wilson. His father was a New Zealander by birth while his mother was of Irish descent. The couple had a second son, Leslie, who was born in 1902. The family moved to New Zealand to attend a family reunion and due to the possibility of Wilson’s father obtaining the commission to design the Palmerston North Opera House. The family moved to New Zealand in 1903, and made their home in Wellington. The marriage did not last and Frank Wilson returned to Australia (where he later remarried), leaving his sons to be raised by their mother. Mary ran a boarding house in Ghuznee Street, Wellington, to support herself and her children. Gordon was educated at the Terrace School and at Wellington Technical College.

== Career ==
Upon leaving school Wilson was articled in 1916 to Wellington architect William M. Page.

In 1920 Wilson began working for the Wellington-based architectural partnership of Hoggard, Prouse and Gummer. He transferred within the business to Auckland where he continued his architectural studies by studying part-time at the Auckland University College School of Architecture. Hoggard left the partnership in 1921, leaving Prouse and Gummer in partnership until its dissolution in 1923. Auckland-based William Gummer subsequently formed a new partnership in 1924 with Reginald Ford called Gummer and Ford. The new partners employed Wilson first as a draughtsman and later as chief draughtsman.

Wilson subsequently completed his professional examinations in 1928 and was admitted to the New Zealand Institute of Architects (NZIA). After gaining his professional qualifications Wilson in the company of an architect friend travelled to the United States where he spent six months exploring California, with the exception of a mule-back tour of the Grand Canyon. The onset of the Great Depression caused him to return home where he took up an associate partnership with Gummer and Ford.

During his time with Gummer and Ford Wilson is known to have worked on the Remuera Public Library, Auckland Railway Station, Wellington Public Library (now the City Gallery Wellington), the National War Memorial, and the National Art Gallery and Dominion Museum building in Wellington.

=== Department of Housing Construction ===
In late 1936, Wilson left Gummer and Ford to take up the position of chief architect of newly created Department of Housing Construction, which had been established by the first Labour government to undertake the construction of state rental houses. Not only was Wilson largely responsible for the Department's organisation and development, he was also in charge of the design aspects of state housing.

Wilson employed a number of refugee European architects, including Helmut Einhorn, Fred Farrar, Ernst Gerson, Friedrich Neumann (who anglicised his name to Frederick "Fred" Newman), and Ernst Plischke. Their previous experience with the design of mass housing in Europe influenced Wilson’s thinking and was utilised by him in developing the government’s first rental apartment blocks in the 1940s. These were designed to offer affordable rental housing for low-income individuals and families. Built in the Modernist style, the most significant in Wellington were the Berhampore State Flats, the Dixon Street Flats, the McLean State Flats, the Hanson Street Flats, and in Auckland, the Grey’s Avenue Flats and Symonds Street Flats.

The Department of Housing Construction became the Housing Division of the Ministry of Works in 1943. Wilson was its chief architect until 1948, when he was appointed assistant government architect.

In 1946 Wilson travelled to the United States where he met architects Walter Gropius, Carl Koch and Hugh Stubbins.

=== Government architect ===
Following the retirement of Robert Patterson, Wilson was appointed Government Architect in 1952. As government architect, Wilson was responsible for the design of government buildings, educational buildings and state housing. Major projects undertaken during his tenue were the Bledisloe State Building, the Bowen State Building, the School of Engineering building at the University of Canterbury and the University of Otago Dental School building.

He was also associated with development plans for universities and as an assessor of architectural competitions. In 1954 Wilson travelled to United States, United Kingdom and Europe. While in the United Kingdom he discussed the design of New Zealand House in London with its architect Robert Matthew.

== Death ==
Wilson died suddenly on 23 February 1959 in a street in Wellington. Fergus Sheppard was appointed to succeed Wilson as Government Architect.

== Recognition ==
In 1932 he entered the R.I.B.A. Empire Victory Scholarship Competition, which was an Empire architectural award. His entry which was specially commended, was one of the three out of more than 400 entries from all British countries to be published in the journal of the Royal Institute of British Architects. Wilson was awarded the New Zealand Institute of Architects' Gold Medal in 1948 for the design of the Dixon Street State Flats.

In 1951 Wilson was made a fellow of the New Zealand Institute of Architects and in 1954 he was made an associate of the Royal Institute of British Architects. In 1953, he was awarded the Queen Elizabeth II Coronation Medal.

Wilson served on the Association of New Zealand Art Societies, the Architectural Centre Council National Historic Places Trust, the Town Planning Board, as well as on the council and executive committee of the New Zealand Institute of Architects.

As a sign of the respect with which he was held the Gordon Wilson Flats in Wellington which were under construction at the time of Wilson’s death were named after him.

== Personal life ==
Wilson married American, Virginia "Ginny" Abigail Smith, who was just off the boat from California on 4 March 1937 at St Paul’s Cathedral Church in Wellington. From 1940 onwards the couple lived in a house at 83 Campbell Street, Wellington, which had been designed by Wilson. They had three sons and two daughters.

Following her husband’s death his wife returned to the United States. Two of the couple's sons, Michael and Peter, became architects in California.

== Works ==
Among the buildings which Wilson personally designed, collaborated on or supervised the design of are:

Building	Image	Completed	Location	Notes
Berhampore State Flats		1940	493–507 Adelaide Road, Berhampore, Wellington	Also known as the Centennial Flats. Given Heritage New Zealand historic place category 1 status in 1998.
Stepped Flats		1941	Strathmore, Wellington	
Dixon Street Flats		1944	134 Dixon Street, Wellington	A key building in the development of Modern architecture in New Zealand and is one of the first examples of that style in New Zealand it was designed in association with Ernst Plischke. Drawings prepared in 1940. The Dixon Street flats were awarded a gold medal by the NZIA in 1947. Given Heritage New Zealand historic place category 1 status in 1997.
McLean Flats		1945	314 The Terrace, Wellington	Designed by Friedrich Neumann (Frederick Newman) under Wilson’s oversight.
Lower Greys Avenue Flats		1947	95–113 Greys Avenue, Auckland	Consists of four modernist medium-rise apartment blocks. Designed in association with Ernest Plischke. Conceptual drawings were started late in 1941 and the contract drawings were prepared in August and September 1944.
Hanson Street Flats		1944	Hanson Street, Wellington	
Symonds Street Flats		1947	44 Symonds Street, Auckland	Designed by Friedrich Neumann (Frederick Newman) under Wilson’s oversight. They are listed as a Category A Heritage place in the Auckland Unitary Plan.
School of Engineering		1961	University of Canterbury, Christchurch	Constructed in stages between 1954 and 1961. Designed in association with Helmut Einhorn.
Upper Greys Avenue Flats		1957	Greys Avenue, Auckland	Contains 70 two-bedroomed maisonettes and 16 bed-sits.
Bledisloe House		1959	24 Wellesley Street West, Auckland	Designed in association with Douglas Jocelyn "Jock" Beehre.
Gordon Wilson Flats		1959	314–320 The Terrace, Wellington	The first concept sketch was produced in 1943 with working drawing produced in July–August 1954 and site work commencing in 1956. The 10-storey public housing building contains 87 units consisting of 12 single floor bedsits on the ground floor, and on the remaining floors, 75 two-bedroom two-storey maisonette style flats with their own staircases.
School of Dentistry		1959	280–310 Great King Street and Frederick Street, University of Otago, Dunedin	Designed by Ian Reynolds under Wilson’s oversight. The building was awarded an Enduring Architecture Award by the Southern Branch of the New Zealand Institute of Architects in 2000. Given Heritage New Zealand historic place category 1 status in 2005.
Bowen State Building		1961	Bowen Street, Wellington	Designed in association with Douglas Jocelyn "Jock" Beehre and Ian Reynolds. This 10-storey modernist building featured a glass curtain wall with thin mullions.
