= Anna Plischke =

New Zealand garden and landscape designer

- Born: 1895; Vienna, Austria
- Died: 1983 (aged 87–88); Vienna, Austria
- Occupation: Landscape designer
- Spouse: Ernst Plischke

Anna Plischke (formerly Lang, née Schwitzer; 1895–1983) was a landscape designer trained in Vienna, who practised in New Zealand. She introduced modernist ideas of design to the built environment and architectural practice.

== Biography ==
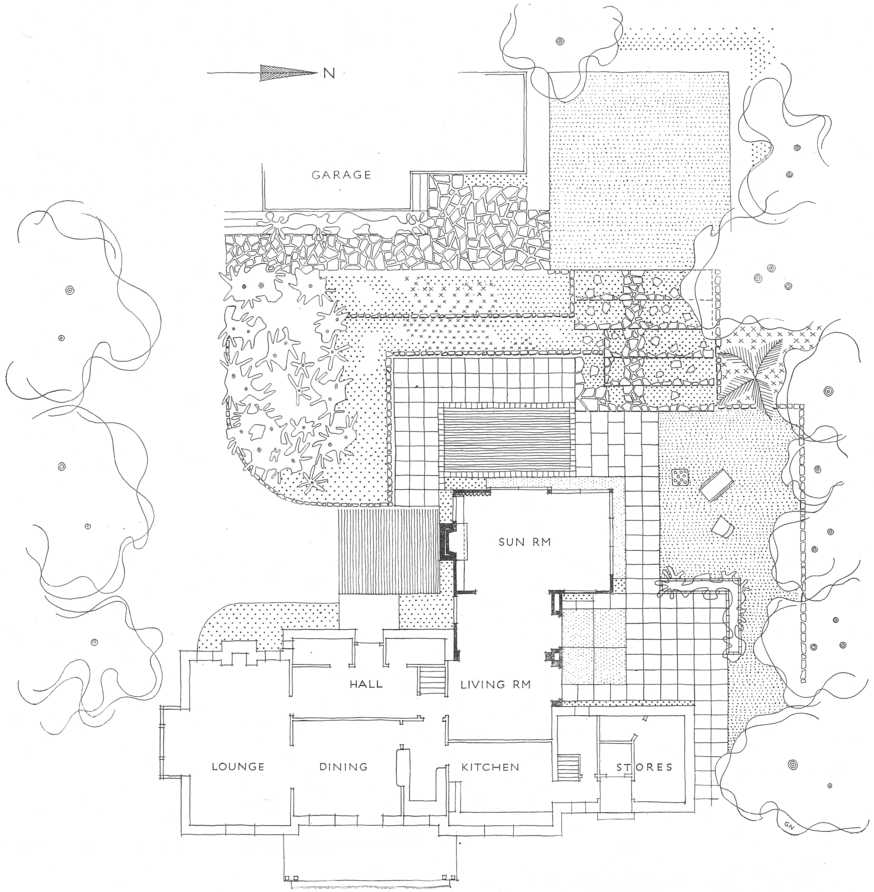
A house floorplan, designed by Ernst and Anna Plischke (1952)

Plischke's father was Jewish merchant Hugo Schwitzer, and her mother was Hedwig Nossal. In Vienna, where she grew up, she gained an arts degree. She trained in horticulture at the Rothschilds' garden and then went on to work in landscape gardening.

After her marriage to Ernst Plischke, the couple came to New Zealand as refugees in 1939 as she was under threat from the Gestapo due to her Jewish heritage. In New Zealand, they were classified as German under the Aliens Emergency regulations and only avoided being interred on Matiu Somes Island in Wellington Harbour because of her husband's status in his government job with the Housing Department.

In New Zealand, Plischke often worked together with her architect husband; he would design the houses and she the landscapes, although he also used her input in specifying the interior finishes including "wood veneers, fittings and fabrics". The 1947 publication Design and Living was about the Frankel House in Christchurch with Ernst's architecture and Anna's landscaping, which was an extension of the living space with a 'living terrace' off the living room. Another design was a renovation of a neo-Georgian house in Wellington where windows and a big sliding door opened out to courtyards. She designed approximately 15 gardens in New Zealand. In 1951, Plischke wrote an essay for national New Zealand journal Design Review called "A Garden for Pleasure", introducing concepts of curved relaxed gardens that differed from formal British garden design of the time.

== Personal life ==
Plischke's first marriage was to businessman Robert Lang. They had a child together, and divorced in 1935. Her second husband was Ernst Plischke.

Plischke's son is Henry George Lang (formerly Heinrich Lang).

She died in Vienna in 1983.
