= Ernst Plischke =

Austrian-New Zealand modernist architect (1903–1992)

Ernst Anton Plischke
- Born: June 26, 1903; Klosterneuburg, Austria
- Died: 23 May, 1992; Vienna, Austria
- Notable work: Massey House, Wellington (1957); Abel Tasman Monument (1942)
- Spouse: Anna Plischke

Ernst Anton Plischke (June 26, 1903 – 23 May, 1992) was an Austrian-New Zealand modernist architect, town planner and furniture designer whose work is well known throughout Europe and New Zealand.

== Early years ==
Plischke was born in the town of Klosterneuburg near Vienna (Austria) in 1903. His father worked as an architect and his mother came from a family of cabinet-makers. From an early age he spent time in workshops and studios, before studying interior- and furniture-design at Vienna's College of Arts and Crafts at 16.

At the age of twenty, influenced by his father to become an architect, he was accepted into a Master School run by leading architect Peter Behrens. His architecture as a student reflected the dynamic and repetitive nature of the early modernist style.

After graduating from the academy in 1926, Plischke worked in Peter Behrens's private office, and in 1929 travelled to New York to work, but the start of the Great Depression in 1929 ruined this opportunity.

In 1930, the Austrian government commissioned Plischke to build the Labour Exchange building in Liesing. Completion of this in 1931 made him one of Austria's leading architects. He became a member of the Austrian Werkbund movement, and contributed a building to the experimental housing research project, the Werkbundsiedlung.

One of the Plischke's early houses, the Gamerith House at Attersee, foreshadows his later work in New Zealand. The house fits into the surrounding landscape and has a boat-like quality.

In 1935, he married Anna Lang-Schwizer and received the Austrian State Prize for architecture.

In March 1938, Germany occupied Austria. German law required that all architects had to become part of a centralised Reich Chamber of Culture. Because his wife was Jewish, he was not accepted into the Chamber of Arts. This, along with the banning of modernist buildings by the German occupation, led Plischke to move to New Zealand in 1939.

== New Zealand architect ==
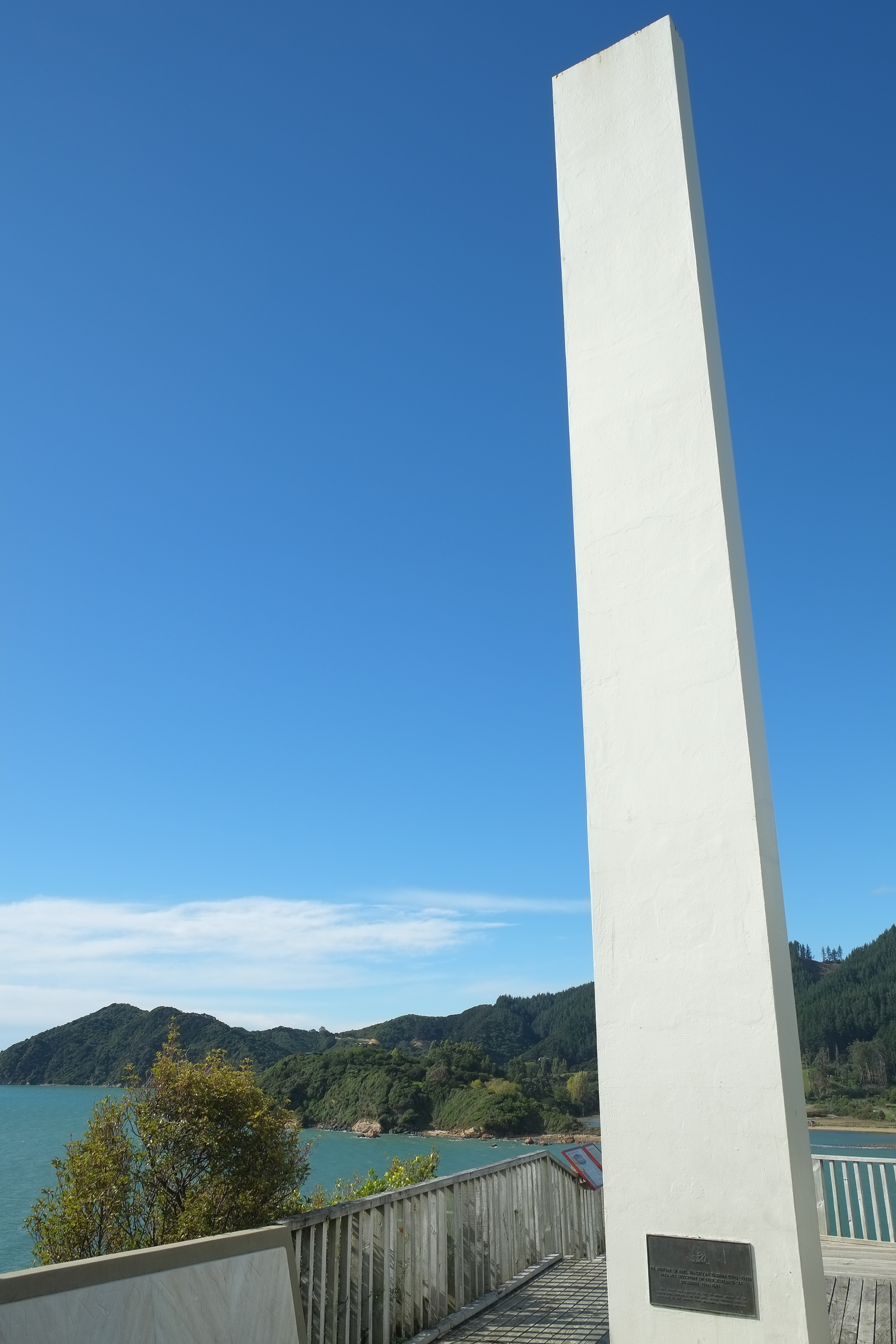
Abel Tasman Monument (1942)

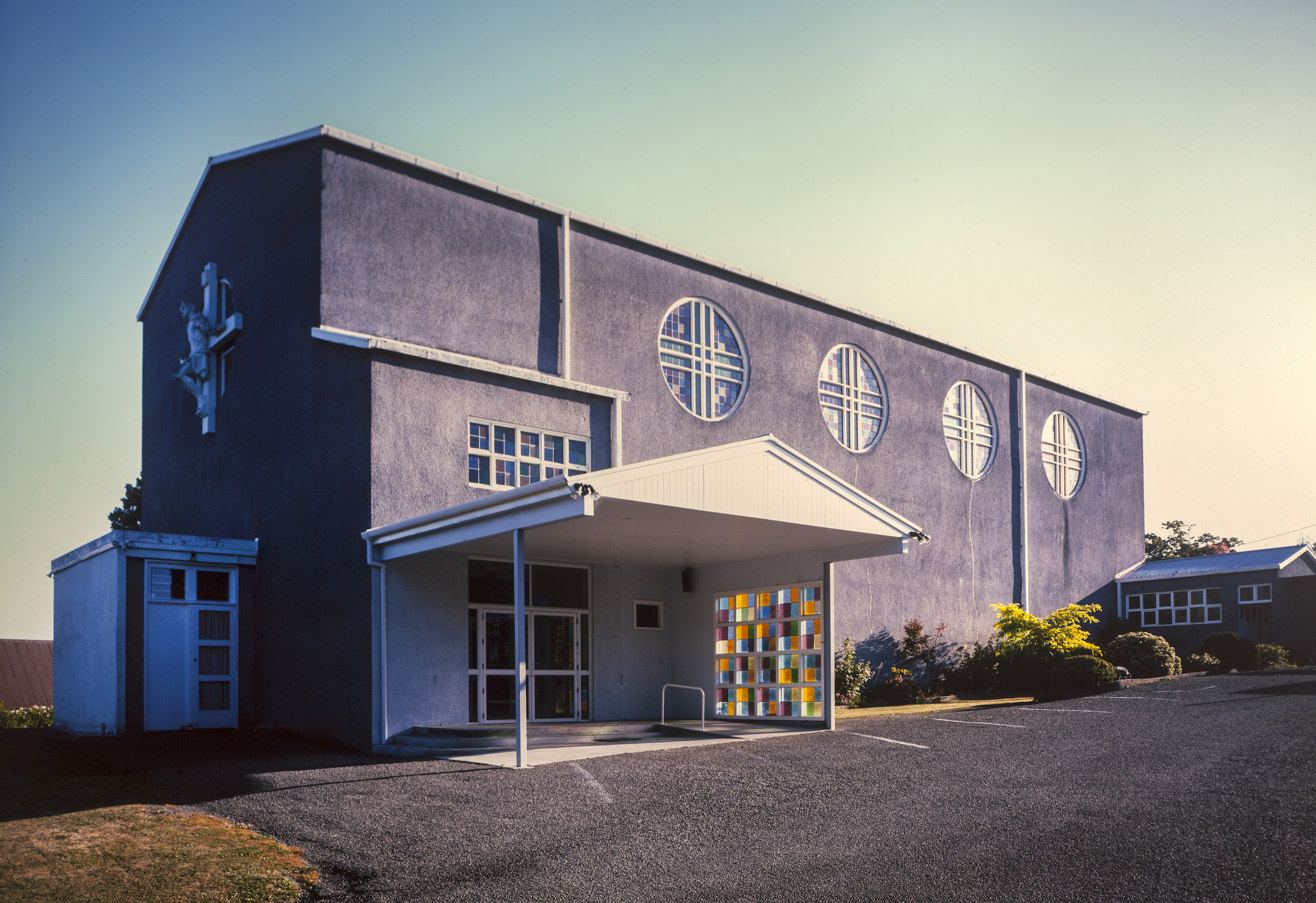
St Mary's Church, Taihape (1951)

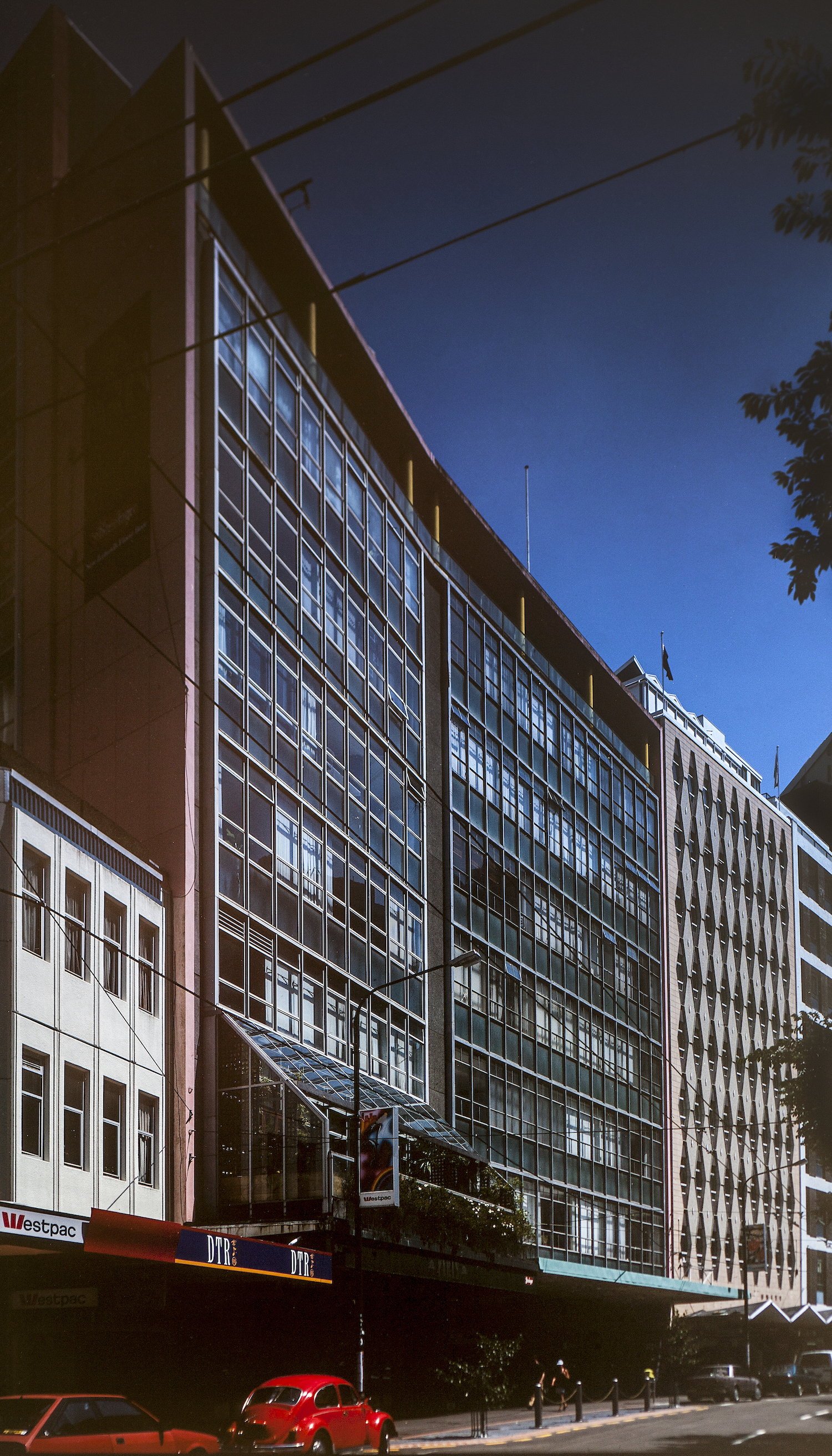
Massey House, Wellington (1957) (centre)

Ernst Plischke emigrated to New Zealand, arriving in Wellington on 9 May 1939 alongside Anna and her son Heinrich Lang, after travelling through London. During the Second World War, they were officially classified as enemy aliens; however, authorities deemed them reliable enough that they would only be interned if an invasion of New Zealand occurred. Plischke and his family were eventually naturalised as New Zealand citizens in 1946.

When Plischke arrived in New Zealand in 1939 with his wife Anna, he was already known in architectural circles to be at the forefront of modernist design. He began working for the Ministry of Housing on projects such as the Dixon Street Flats. In 1942, he designed the Abel Tasman Monument for a site in Golden Bay for the tercentenary of Abel Tasman's visit to New Zealand. From 1943 to 1947 he worked for the Department of Town Planning producing work in areas including: Naenae, Trentham, Tāmaki and Mangakino. He also completed private work during this time, including the Frankel House in Christchurch (for Otto Frankel), which was his first commission. Frankel House is a Category 2 entry on the Heritage New Zealand register.

Although Plischke was an internationally recognised architect, he struggled to gain acceptance within New Zealand’s architectural community. He refused to undertake additional examinations to join the New Zealand Institute of Architects, believing his qualifications and experience should have sufficed.

In 1947, the Government of New Zealand gave a desk made to a design by Plischke as their official wedding gift to Princess Elizabeth.

In 1947, he unsuccessfully applied to be chair of design at the School of Architecture at Auckland University College.

In 1948 he formed the 'Plishke & Firth' partnership with Cedric Firth. Massey House (1951–1957) located on Lambton Quay was their biggest project, with Plischke designing the concept due to Firth being abroad. The partnership ended in 1959 and Plischke joined Robert Fantl in another partnership, but with work drying up in the early 1960s Plischke accepted an academic role back in Vienna, Austria.

== Back to Vienna ==
Leaving behind his adopted country, in 1963 Plischke took up the role of Professor of Architecture at the Academy of Fine Arts in Vienna. Teaching and writing took up much of his time during the last decades of his life. A couple of significant books he wrote were Vom Menschlichen im neuen Bauen (‘On the human aspect in modern architecture’) and a Biography; Ernst A. Plischke; Ein Leben mit Architektur. Austria also rewarded him with a number of awards; Austrian Cross of Honor for Science and the Arts, First Class (1973) and the Golden Medal of Honor for Science and the Arts (1988). He was made Honorary Member of the Academy of Fine Arts Vienna (1983), Honorary Member of the American Institute of Architects (1987) and Honorary Member of the Austrian Society for Architecture (1988).

Plischke died aged 89, in Vienna on 23 May 1992.
