= David Mitchell (architect) =

New Zealand architect (1941–2018)

- Born: David John Mitchell; 8 March 1941; Auckland, New Zealand
- Died: 26 April 2018 (aged 77); Takapuna, New Zealand
- Education: BArch at the University of Auckland, 1964
- Occupation: Architect
- Awards: NZIA Gold Medal (2005); University of Auckland Distinguished Alumni Award (2016)
- Practice: Mitchell Stout Dodd Architects

David John Mitchell (8 March 1941 – 26 April 2018) was a New Zealand architect based in Auckland. He presented the 1984 television series The Elegant Shed, and co-authored the book of the same name. Mitchell was awarded the gold medal of the New Zealand Institute of Architects (NZIA) in 2005.

== Biography ==
Born in Auckland on 8 March 1941, Mitchell was the son of John McFarlane Mitchell and Leonelle Lucy Mitchell (née Tizard), and the nephew of psychologist Jack Tizard. Mitchell was brought up in Morrinsville, and completed his architecture studies at the University of Auckland, graduating with a Bachelor of Architecture in 1964. He became a registered architect in 1967.

In the early 1970s, Mitchell was involved with Aardvark Films. With Roger Donaldson and Ian Mune, he co-wrote the 1974 television film, Derek. Through the 1970s and 1980s, Mitchell was in practice with Jack Manning and Peter Hill, and he also taught at the University of Auckland between 1972 and 1987. In 1984, Mitchell presented the six-point television documentary series The Elegant Shed, which traversed New Zealand architecture since 1945. To accompany the series, Mitchell and Gillian Chaplin wrote the book The Elegant Shed: New Zealand architecture since 1945, which was published by Oxford University Press in 1984.

Mitchell was an avid traveller, adventurer and sailor. In his 30s, he worked on documentaries with Roger Donaldson, travelling to Everest with Sir Edmund Hillary, and then sailing around Cape Horn. In 1990, Mitchell began collaborating with Julie Stout, and they split their time between sailing or travelling around the world while working on projects in Hong Kong and in New Zealand. After living overseas for much of the 1990s, the pair returned to Auckland in 2000 and established Mitchell Stout, later Mitchell Stout Dodd, Architects.

In 2014, Mitchell was the creative director of New Zealand's first ever exhibition at the Venice Biennale of Architecture, entitled "Last, Loneliest, Loveliest".

Mitchell died aged 77 in North Shore Hospital in Auckland on 26 April 2018, having suffered from prostate cancer.

== Works ==
- Northcote Public Library (1982)
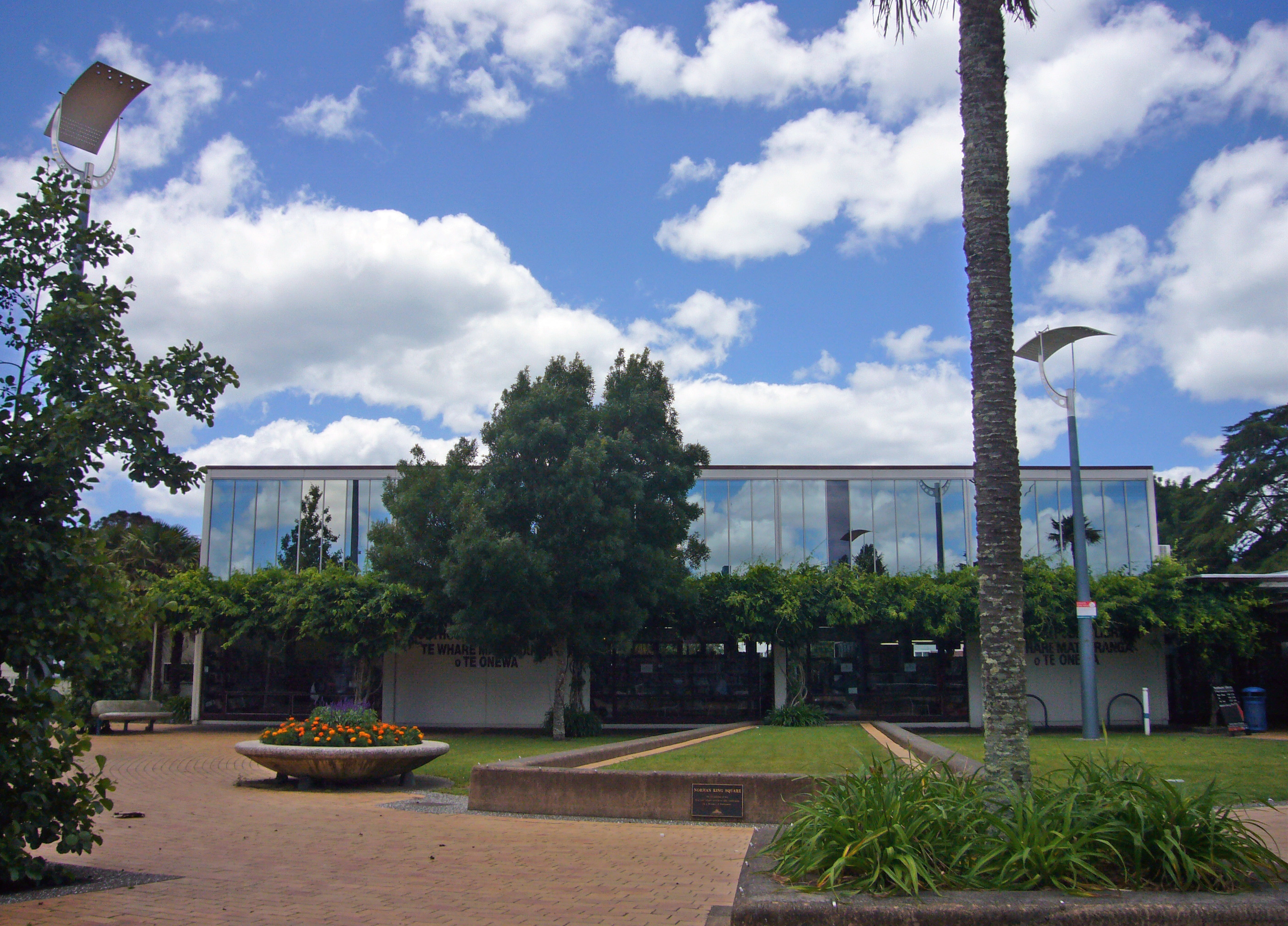
  Northcote Public Library
- Gibbs House, Parnell (1984)
- School of Music, University of Auckland (1986) (designed with Jack Manning)
- Epsom Girls' Grammar School library (1986)
- Mitchell–Stout House, Freemans Bay (1990)
- Gibbs House II, Ōrākei (1991)
- Auckland Art Gallery – New Gallery annexe (1995)
- Landscape and Plant Science Building, Unitec Institute of Technology (2002)
- Mitchell–Stout House, Narrow Neck (2006)
- Tauranga Art Gallery (2007)
- Waiheke Island House (2009)
- Otoparae House, King Country (2013)
- Lopdell House refurbishment (2014)
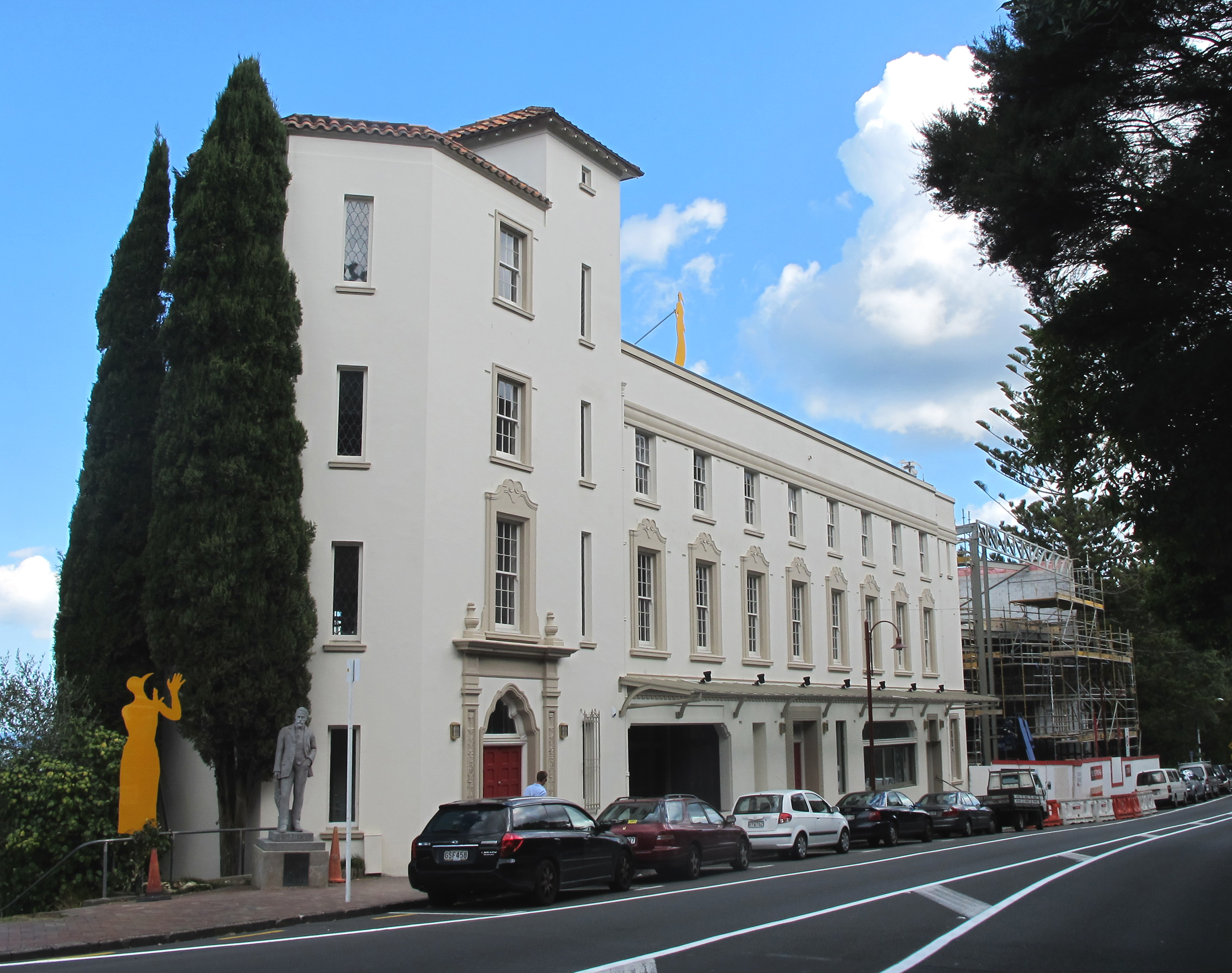
  Lopdell House in 2014 after refurbishment, with Te Uru Waitakere Contemporary Gallery under construction beyond
- Te Uru Waitakere Contemporary Gallery (2014)

== Recognition ==
In 2005, Mitchell was awarded the New Zealand Institute of Architects' gold medal, for his outstanding contribution to the theory and practice of architecture in New Zealand.

Mitchell was the recipient of a distinguished alumni award from the University of Auckland in 2016. He was also a Fellow of the New Zealand Institute of Architects.

The building designed by Mitchell (with Jack Manning) housing the School of Music at the University of Auckland won the NZIA supreme national award in 1986, and in 2013 received an enduring architecture award from the NZIA. The Gibbs House in Parnell won the NZIA supreme national award in 1985 and, 30 years later, an NZIA enduring architecture award.

In 2015, Mitchell & Stout won the NZIA Heritage award for the refurbishment of Lopdell House and the Public Architecture award for Te Uru Waitakere Contemporary Gallery.
