= Julie Stout =

New Zealand architect

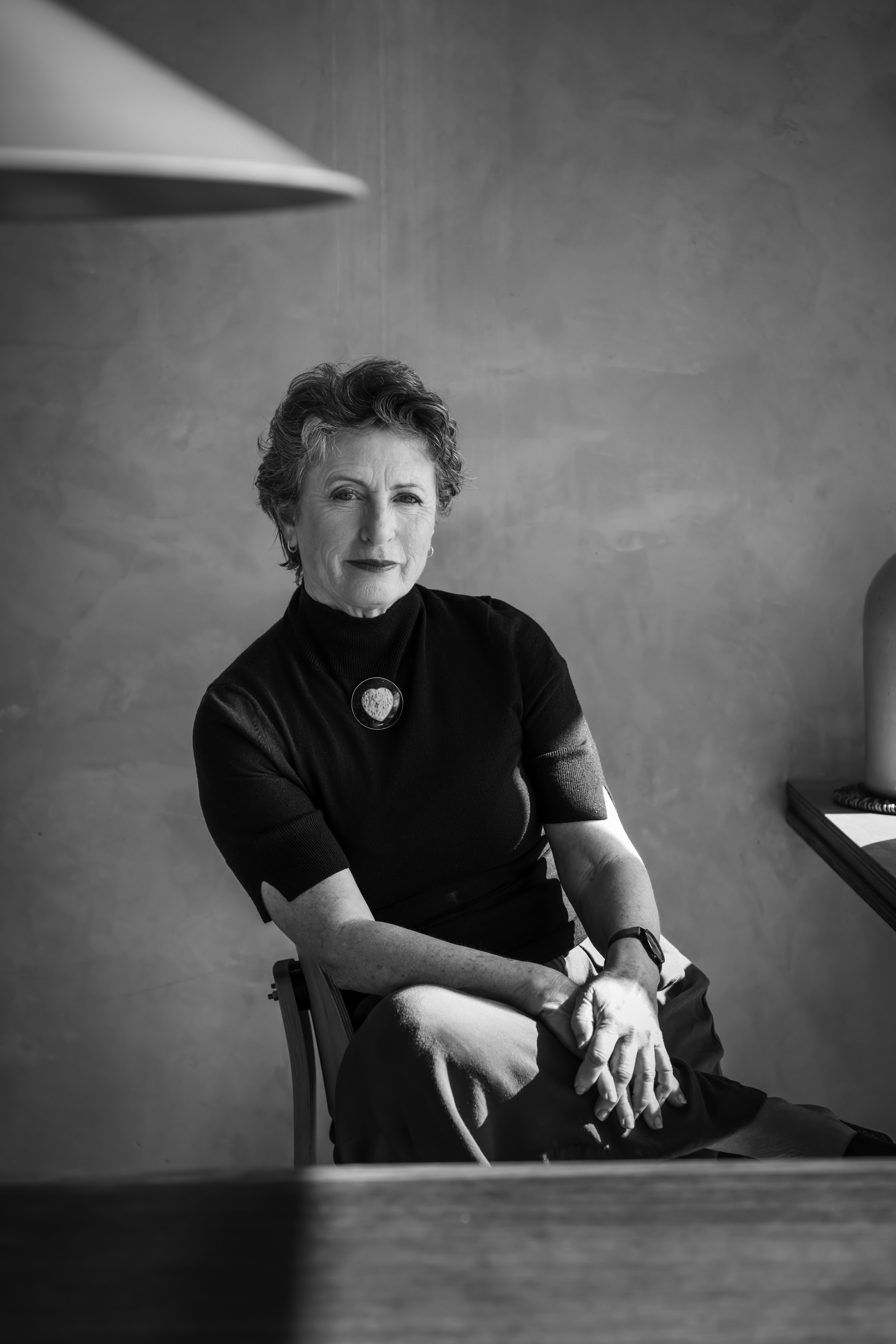
- Stout photo by Rebekah Robinson
- Born: Julie Margaret Stout; 1958 (age 67–68); Palmerston North, New Zealand
- Education: University of Auckland
- Occupation: Architect
- Partner: David Mitchell
- Website: www.mitchellstoutdodd.co.nz

Julie Margaret Stout (born 1958) is a New Zealand architect, academic and urban design advocate based in Auckland. She is a Distinguished Fellow of Te Kāhui Whaihanga New Zealand Institute of Architects (NZIA) and a professional teaching fellow at the University of Auckland's School of Architecture and Planning. She was awarded the 2021 Te Kāhui Whaihanga NZIA Gold Medal.

== Biography ==
Stout was born in Palmerston North in 1958, and was educated at Palmerston North Girls' High School. Her father was a draughtsman and deer culler. She studied at the University of Auckland, graduating with a Bachelor of Architecture in 1985, and gained registration as an architect in 1989. Early in her career, Stout worked with Marshall Cook at Cook Hitchcock Sargisson, and with architect Murray Cockburn in Fiji. In 1989, she formed Mitchell and Stout Architects Ltd with partner in life and work, architect David Mitchell. The pair split their time travelling by boat and working together up to Mitchell's death in 2018. Stout has also practised in Hong Kong.

In 2001, Stout became a member of the NZIA Auckland Branch Urban Issues Group, which she went on to chair between 2002 and 2003. In 2005, she was made a member of Auckland mayor Dick Hubbard's Urban Task Force, which was described by The New Zealand Herald as "an attempt to block bad architecture passing for urban renewal". She joined the Society for the Protection of Auckland City and Waterfront Inc (Urban Auckland) in 2009, and chaired the lobby group between 2010 and 2021. In the role, Stout fronted a successful campaign to stop Ports of Auckland's continued expansion of wharves into the Waitematā Harbour.

Alongside Mitchell, Rau Hoskins and others, Stout was part of the creative team that designed New Zealand’s first show, Last, Loneliest, Loveliest, at the Venice Biennale of Architecture in 2014.

Stout is a partner at Auckland architecture practice Mitchell Stout Dodd.

== Works ==
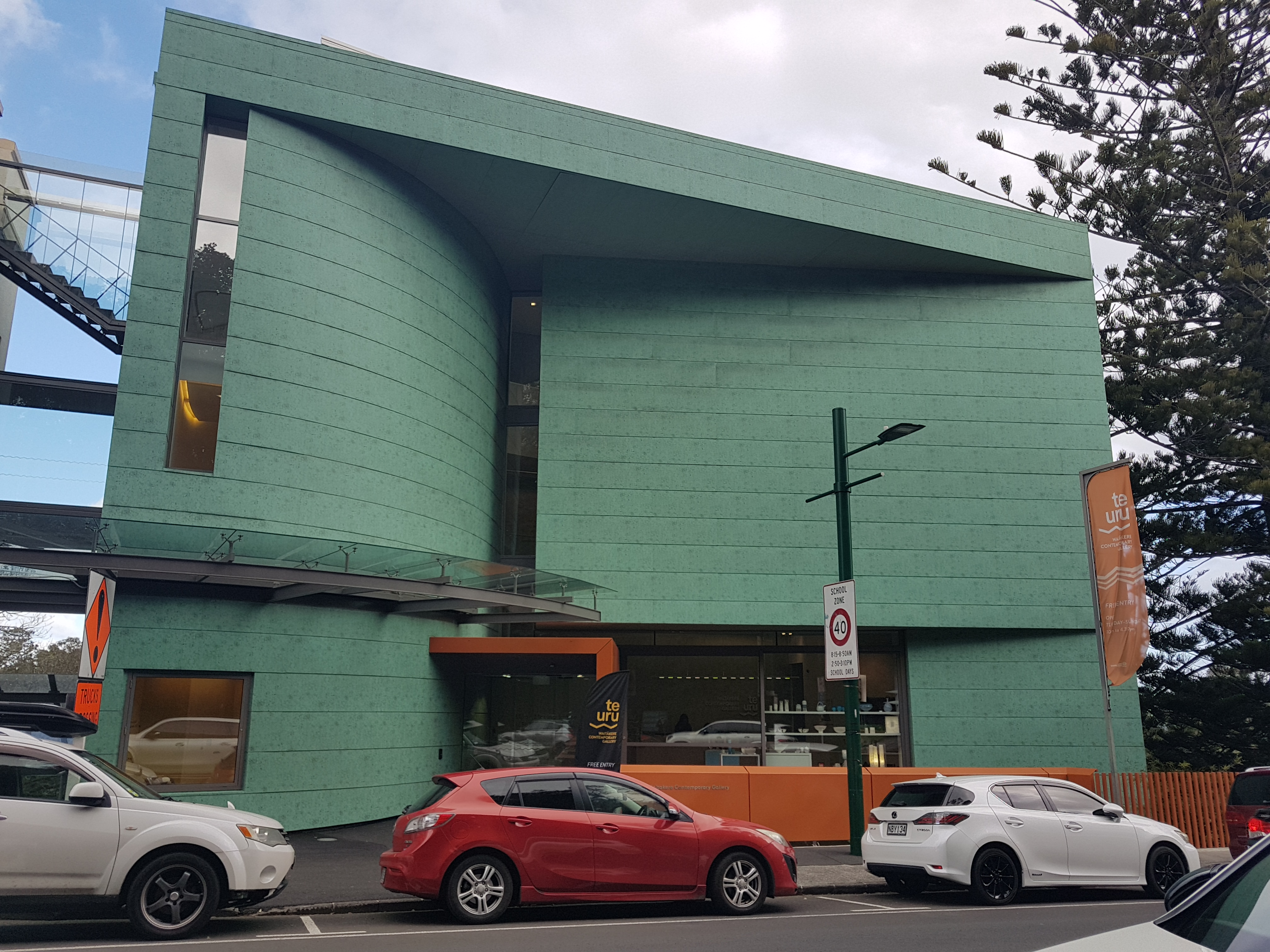
Te Uru Waitākere Contemporary Gallery

- Baragwanath House, Parnell (1987)
- Mitchell–Stout House, Freemans Bay (1990)
- Auckland Art Gallery – NEW Gallery (1995)
- Waitamariki House, Bay of Islands (1998)
- Landscape and Plant Science Building, Unitec Institute of Technology (2002)
- Mitchell-Stout House, Narrow Neck (2006)
- Tauranga Art Gallery (2007)
- Fishman House, Waiheke Island (2009)
- Otoparae House, King Country (2013)
- Lopdell House refurbishment, Titirangi (2014)
- Te Uru Waitākere Contemporary Gallery, Titirangi (2014)

== Awards and honours ==
- Te Kāhui Whaihanga NZIA Fellow of the Institute. – 2003
- Te Kāhui Whaihanga NZIA President's Award. – 2005, 2015
- A+W NZ Dulux Awards, category Chrystall Excellence Award. – 2014
- Te Kāhui Whaihanga NZIA Distinguished Fellow. – 2017
- Te Kāhui Whaihanga NZIA Gold Medal. – 2021
