= Association of Women Artists (Auckland) =

Art collective in Auckland (1980–1998)

The Association of Women Artists (AWA) was a feminist art collective formed in Auckland, New Zealand in 1980, to celebrate and exhibit New Zealand, specifically Auckland, women's art. They emerged as an Auckland iteration of the Women's Art Movement and were a catalyst for the formation of similar groups across New Zealand. They were active until 1998, staging numerous exhibitions, workshops and forums at Outreach Gallery, Ponsonby.

== History ==
Carole Shepheard established the Association of Women Artists in 1980 after a successful exhibition (Women in the Arts) at Outreach Gallery. The collective intended to make visible women artists, specifically from the Auckland region, and provide them a community of likeminded individuals. Their numerous exhibitions also ensured that Auckland women's art was recorded.

AWA staged at least two exhibitions a year for the period they were active, and these exhibitions were organised in innovative ways to celebrate women in the arts. Consistent exhibitions sustained artists visibility, as women who took breaks between showings often lost relevance as serious practitioners. AWA exhibitions were diverse, multimedia displays, showcasing a wide range of styles of art. They encouraged artists of all backgrounds and mediums, breaking down hierarchies between fine arts and crafts, hierarchies which typically devalued women's artists. AWA countered mainstream art institutions tendency to have exhibitions reflect and reinforcing a male-dominated art world.

AWA provided educational tools to artists, such as workshops, endeavouring to develop more New Zealand women artists. Forums were organised where both local and international artists, historians and administrators could address women's concerns and new developments in women's art. They also ran a newsletter, which informed its members of any relevant exhibitions, publications and courses.

The organisation stopped functioning in 1998, facing issues with financing and meeting attendance. Funds came from subscriptions and commission on exhibition sales, which only sat at 10%. Work by the association resurfaced in 2018 with Envoy Onwards, a re-staging by Te Uru Waitākere Contemporary Art Gallery of AWA's international postcard exhibition.

=== Notable members ===
- Carole Shepheard
- Lois McIvor
- Margaret Lawlor-Bartlett
- Merylyn Tweedie
- Claudia Pond Eyley

Any woman was free to join the Association of Women's Artists. By 1991, 11 years after AWA was formed, the association had 115 individual members and twelve institutions as members. Most of the women artists in Auckland had some association with AWA during this period.

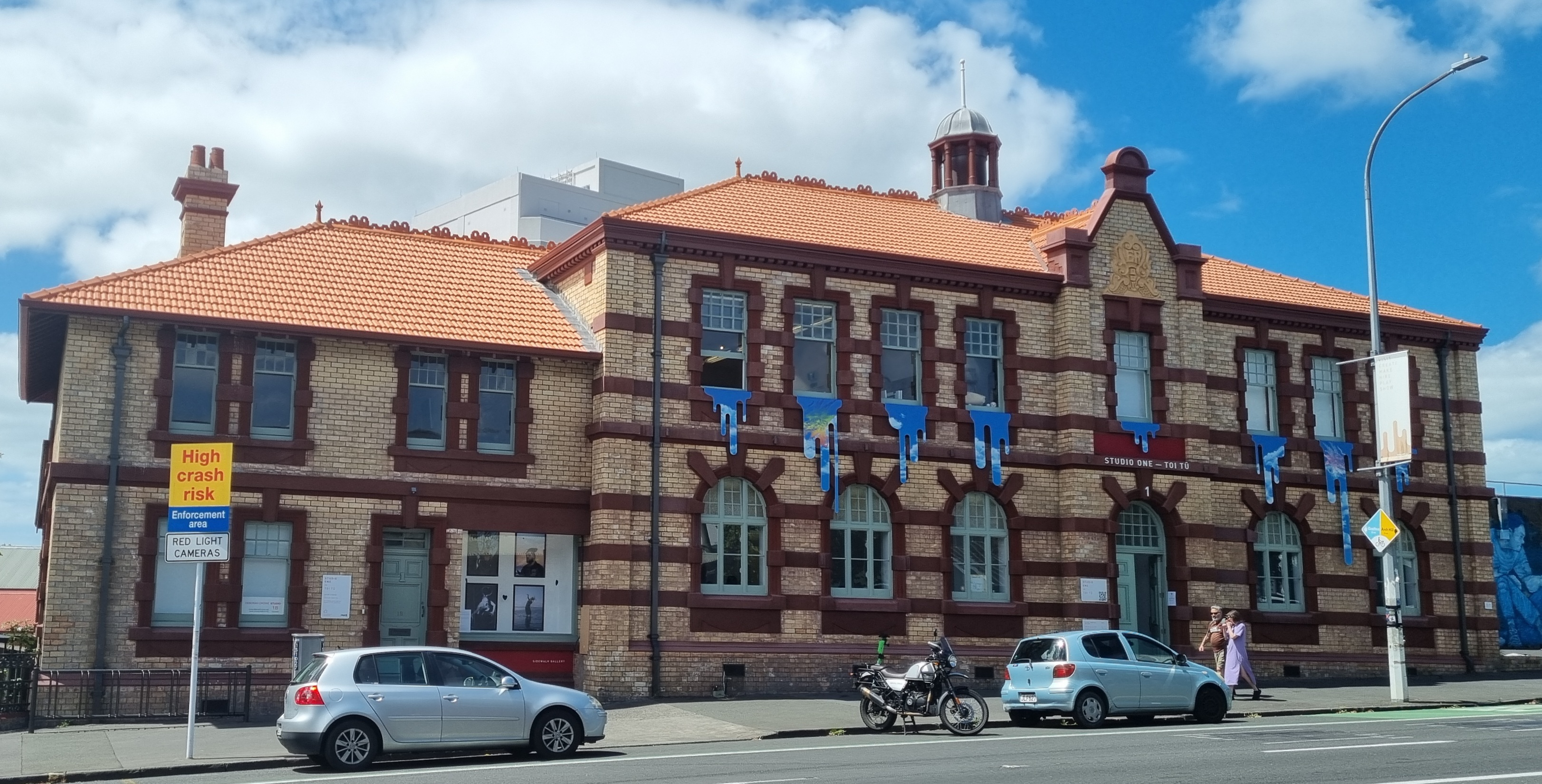
Studio One - Toi Tu, previously Outreach Gallery.

=== Outreach Gallery, Ponsonby ===
Outreach Gallery supported the Association of Women's Artists and it was the main location where AWA would exhibit and meet. It was also the site of inception for AWA, after Carole Shepheard's successful exhibition Women in the Arts in 1980.

The Gallery was created in the late 1970s as an extension of Auckland City Art Gallery to facilitate educational programmes and experiences for the community. Located at the refurbished Ponsonby Police Station at 1 Ponsonby Road, it offered workshops, art experiences, exhibition spaces, as well as tutelage to students in the visual and performing arts fields. Outreach Gallery was also known as Artstation, and is still in operation today under the name Studio One Toi Tū.

== Key exhibitions ==
=== Women in the Arts (1980) ===
'Women in the Arts was a multimedia exhibition staged in 1980, coordinated by artist Carole Shepheard, education curator Don Soloman and American artist Connie Fleres. The purpose of the exhibition was to demonstrate the diversity and quality of women artists in New Zealand and to give otherwise isolated voices a platform. Shepheard contacted all the artists she could locate to contribute, not placing value on their experience in exhibiting or working as an artist. The exhibition also aimed to give local Auckland women an opportunity to have their art displayed.

Forty women from in and around Auckland were exhibited at Women in Arts. The works were selected by two Wellington artists, Barbara Strathdee and Vivian Lynn, along with gallery director Janne Land. Works were shown from the likes of Sylvia Siddell, Annette Isbey, Marte Szirmay, Philippa Blair, Victoria Edwards, Juliet Batten, Lois Mcivor and Allie Eagle.

The Women in the Arts exhibition kickstarted AWA.

=== Women by Women (1983) ===
Women by Women was a 1983 multimedia exhibition that included performance arts and films, all made by women. It coincided with the South Pacific Women's Conference, and was held at Outreach Gallery, Auckland.

=== Envoys (1996), and Envoys Onwards (2018) ===
Envoys (1996) was a response by the Association of Women Artists to new communication technologies. It took place in 1996, but the project began in 1993 on the centenary of women's suffrage in New Zealand. The exhibition was held at Lopdell House Gallery and consisted of hundreds of handmade, personalised postcards made all across the world and sent to New Zealand. It intended to celebrate international relationships and celebrating cultural differences. AWA was successful in creating international connections through the exhibition, sending slides of work by New Zealand women artists to London's Women's Art Library to hold in their collections.

In 2018, the exhibition was restaged by Te Uru to mark the 125th anniversary of women's suffrage in New Zealand. The original postcards were displayed alongside a new selection of postcards by women artists of the new generation.
