= NZIA Gold Medal =

New Zealand architectural award

The New Zealand Institute of Architects Gold Medal is an award presented annually by the Te Kāhui Whaihanga New Zealand Institute of Architects (NZIA) to a New Zealand architect.

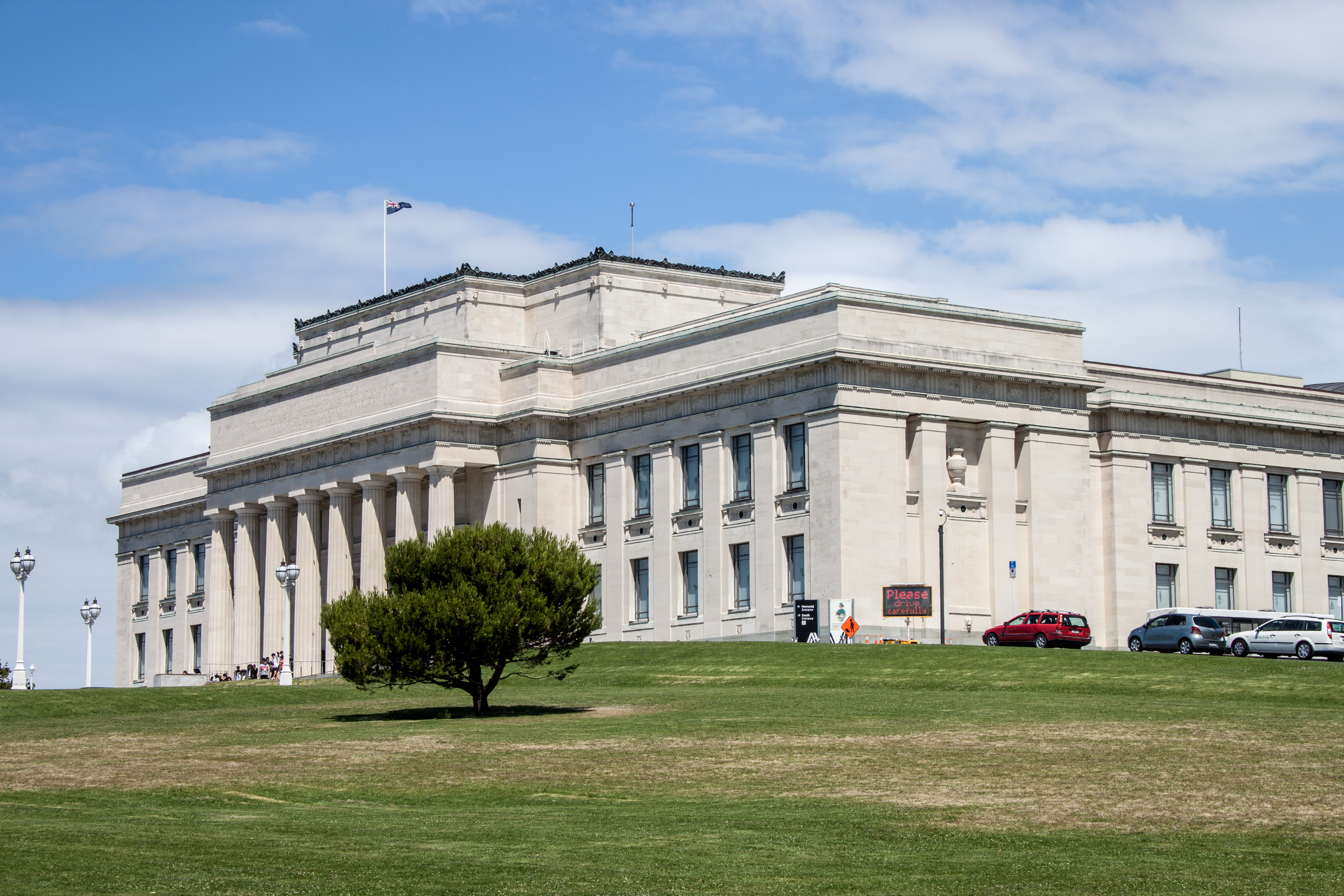
Grierson, Aimer & Draffin's design for the Auckland War Memorial Museum won the Gold Medal in 1929.

== History ==
From 1927 until 1977 a gold, silver or bronze prize was awarded each for the design of a public building and was judged by the Royal Institute of British Architects. In 1978 a "National Award" replaced the Gold Medal.

The Gold Medal was reintroduced in 1999 and was awarded to an architect who, over a period of time, made an outstanding contribution to the practice of architecture, as demonstrated through the production of a consistently high-quality body of work.

== Recipients ==
=== 1927–1977 ===
Year	Name	Building	Award	Ref.
1927	Stanley Fearn	William Booth Memorial Training College, Wellington	Gold	
1928	Gummer and Ford	Remuera Library, Auckland	Gold	
1929	Grierson, Aimer & Draffin	Auckland War Memorial Museum	Gold	
1930	Surrey S. Alleman	Hampton Court Flats, Auckland	Gold	
1931	Gummer and Ford	Auckland Railway Station	Gold	
1932	Gray Young, Morton and Young	The Wellesley Club, Wellington	Gold	
1933	Tole and Massey	St. Michael's Catholic Church, Auckland	Gold	
1934	Herbert W. Hall	St. David's Memorial Church, Cave, South Canterbury	Gold	
1935	no award			
1936	K. W. Aimer	Marino Gardens, Auckland	Gold	
1937	Horace Massey	Cintra Flats, Auckland	Gold	
1938	A. F. Morgan & Horace Massey	New Public Library, Whangārei	Gold	
1939	Turnbull & Rule	Surgical Block, Public Hospital, Timaru	Gold	
1940	Horace Massey	Wellington Provincial Centennial Memorial	Gold	
1941	no award			
1942	Bernard Jones	His own house, 7 Gill Road, Wellington	Bronze	
1943	no award			
1944	no award			
1945	no award			
1946	Vernon Brown	Lemon House, 51 St. Stephen's Ave, Auckland	Bronze	
1947	Gordon Wilson	Dixon Street Flats, Wellington	Gold	
1948	Richard Toy	His own house, 61 Selwyn Road, Auckland	Bronze	
1949	Watkin & Stermson	Browne House, 83 Heliers Bay Road, Auckland	Bronze	
1950	Massey, Beatson, Rix-Trott & Carter	Massey House, 452A Remuera Road, Auckland	Bronze	
1951	Massey, Beatson, Rix-Trott & Carter	Webb House, 68 Paratai Drive	Bronze	
1952	Structon Group	St. Joseph's Orphanage, Upper Hutt	Gold	
1952	Lightbody & Koefoed	Fordham House, Wadestown	Bronze	
1953	James H. Hall-Kenny	Milk Treatment Station, Penrose, Auckland	Gold	
1953	Massey, Beatson, Rix-Trott & Carter	Redwood House, 20 Westridge Rd, Titirangi	Bronze	
1954	Structon Group	The Church of St. James, Lower Hutt	Gold	
1954	Peter Middleton	Latch House, Auckland	Bronze	
1955	King and Christie	Swallow House, 170 Upland Rd, Auckland	Bronze	
1956	Ted McCoy	Aquinas Hall, Dunedin	Gold	
1956	Ted McCoy	Nees House, Dunedin	Bronze	
1956	Tibor Donner	Vehicle Testing Station, Auckland	Silver	
1957	Tibor Donner	Parnell Baths, Auckland	Gold	
1958	Hall & McKenzie	The Hermitage, Aoraki Mt Cook	Gold	
1958	Derek Wilson	Moore House, Masterton	Bronze	
1959	Warren and Mahoney	Dental Nurses' Training School, Christchurch	Gold	
1960	Paul Pascoe	Christchurch International Airport	Gold	
1960	Mark Brown & Fairhead	Silk Warehouse for Makower McBeath & Co Ltd, Auckland	Silver	
1960	G. G. Kenny	Own house, Auckland	Bronze	
1961	Newman. Smith & Greenhough	Whanganui War Memorial	Gold	

=== Since 1999 ===
The Gold Medal was not awarded in 2007, 2009, 2019 and 2025.

Year	Name
1999	John Scott
2000	Sir Miles Warren
2001	The Group
2002	Ted McCoy
2003	Peter Beaven
2004	Ian Athfield
2005	David Mitchell
2006	Gordon Moller
2007	no award
2008	Ivan Mercep
2009	no award
2010	Marshall Cook
2011	Jack Manning
2012	Pete Bossley
2013	Pip Cheshire
2014	Patrick Clifford
2015	Stuart Gardyne
2016	Roger Walker
2017	Andrew Patterson
2018	Jeremy Salmond
2019	no award
2020	Dave Strachan
2021	Julie Stout
2022	Nicholas Stevens and Gary Lawson
2023	Deidre Brown
2024	Hugh Tennent and Ewan Brown
2025	no award
2026	Richard Naish
