= Lois McIvor =

New Zealand artist

- Born: Lois Rayma McIvor; 22 October 1930; Auckland, New Zealand
- Died: 11 June 2017 (aged 86); Auckland, New Zealand
- Education: Elam School of Fine Arts
- Known for: Painting - landscapes

Lois Rayma McIvor (22 October 1930 – 11 June 2017) was a New Zealand artist from West Auckland. McIvor was one of the founding members of the Association of Women Artists, her career spans 5 decades and continuing well into her final years.

== Career ==
McIvor studied at the Elam School of Fine Arts, Auckland, and later under the private tutelage of Colin McCahon when McIvor was living nearly next door to McCahon in Titirangi.

She was predominantly a landscape painter, often using glowing pastel colours; her landscapes were inspired by Manukau Harbour and Titirangi, where she lived for many years.

McIvor was one of the founding members of the Association of Women Artists, Artists Alliance and the Titirangi Community Arts Council. Artworks by Association of Women Artists collective are held by Auckland Art Gallery, and exhibition catalogues in Auckland War Memorial Museum.

Sylvia Marsters was under tutelage of McIvor in the beginning of Sylvia Marsters' arts career.

Paintings by McIvor are held in public and private collections in New Zealand and overseas, including the Remuera Gallery and The Arts House Trust. There are major retrospective exhibitions on Lois McIvor, including: Collection Classics: Lois McIvor in Te Uru Waitakere Contemporary Gallery, and a retrospective in Northart.

=== Exhibitions ===
Notable exhibitions by McIvor include:

- with The Group in 1962 and 1968
- a retrospective exhibition of her work from 1956 to 2001 held in 2001 at Northart
- Making the World Look New, in 2013 at the Remuera Gallery
- 2017, Collection Classics: Lois McIvor in Te Uru Waitakere Contemporary Gallery.

== Memoir ==
Lois McIvor's 'Memoir of the Sixties' was published by Remuera Gallery in 2008.

== Sales by auction ==
Sales at Webb's auction house, Auckland, include:

- 2020 - untitled (1987)
- 2025 - Taoist Landscape with Moon (1997)
