= Louisa Humphry =

Kiribati, New Zealand artist (1952-)

Louisa Murdoch Humphry MNZM
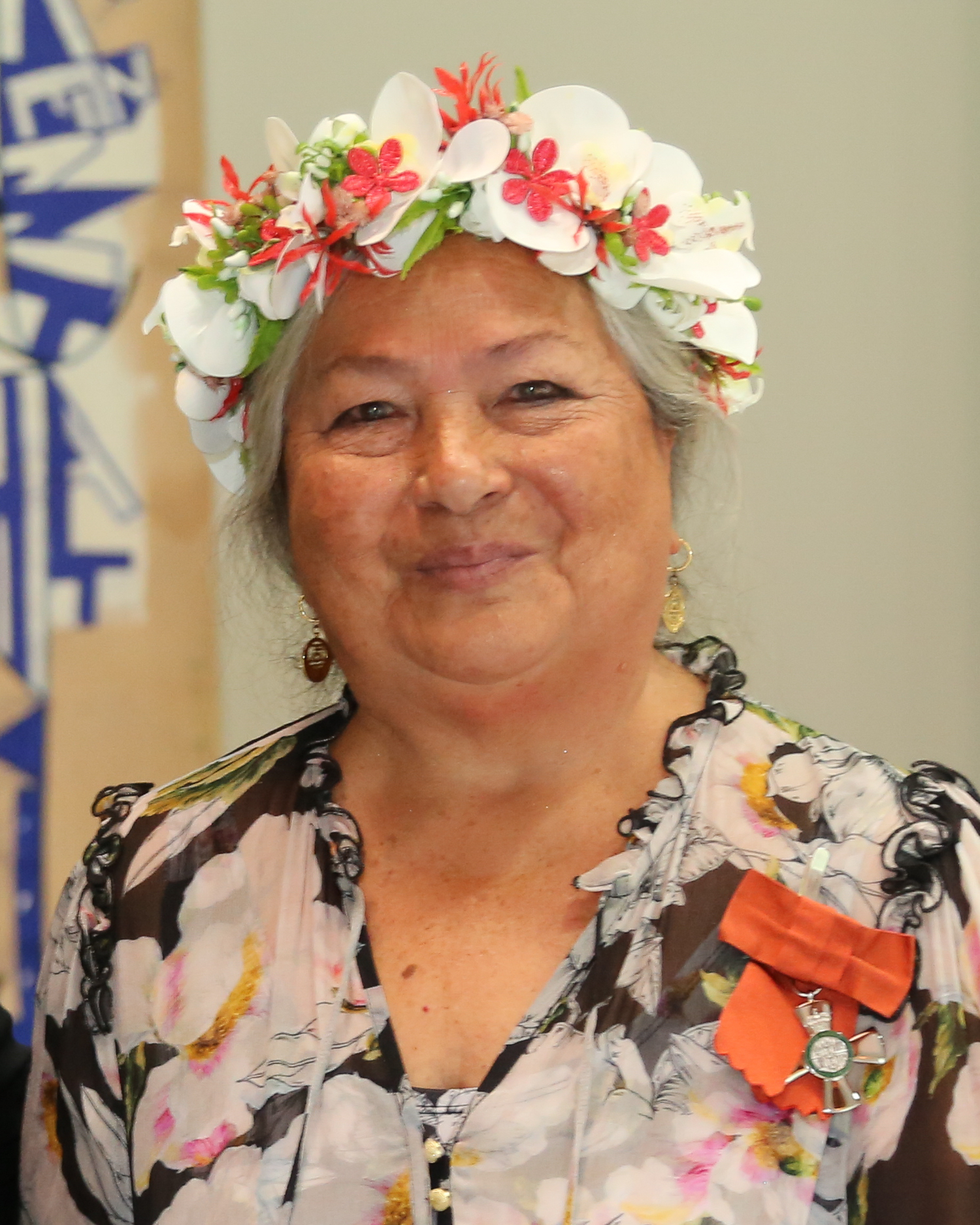
- Humphry in 2022
- Born: 1952 (age 74–73); Kuria, Kiribati
- Education: New Plymouth Girls' High School
- Known for: Weaving, Kiribati heritage art
- Spouse: Jack Humphry
- Awards: Pacific Heritage Artist Award (2019); MNZM (2021)

Louisa Murdoch Humphry MNZM (born 1952) is an I-Kiribati artist and master weaver with over thirty years of experience. Humphry grew up in Kiribati and now resides in New Zealand. In 2019, her work was recognised with a Pacific Heritage Artist Award alongside Kiribati artist Kaetaeta Watson at the Arts Pasifika Awards. In 2021, she was appointed an honorary Member of the New Zealand Order of Merit, for services to the Kiribati community and culture.

== Early life ==
Humphry was born on Kuria (Kiribati) in 1952, she grew up in Kiribati and at age 16 was awarded a scholarship to study in New Zealand. While in New Zealand she attended New Plymouth Girls’ High School and studied nursing at Whangārei Base Hospital. At the end of her studies she went back to Kiribati for family reasons. After she got married her and her husband returned to New Zealand in the early 1970s.

== Career ==
Humphry started weaving and learning about weaving as she was growing up in Kiribati. When she was in New Zealand as a teenager she saw woven war armour from Kiribati displayed at the Auckland War Memorial Museum and describes it as a 'pivotal moment' for her. Humphry has exhibited in Home AKL at the Auckland Art Gallery and Wunderruma at The Dowse Art Museum and Auckland Art Gallery. Some fibres she works with include pandanus, kie kie and harakeke.

Humphry's exhibition in 2013, called Te Eitei at Waikato Museum Te Whare Taonga o Waikato, was an installation about a national icon of Kiribati, the frigatebird.

With Humphry's close collaborator, Kiribati weaver Kaetaeta Watson, and the Tungaru project team, a study of traditional Kiribati woven armour has resulted in a revival of this 'ancient Pacific technology'. They were able to source string made in Kiribati for the project. The makers of the string questioned if they were building a house because they wanted so much quantity. Making the coconut fibre string required is very labour intense. This project was supported by Creative New Zealand and the British Museum, and the work was presented at the Asia-Pacific-Triennial in 2018.

In 2019, Humphry and Watson were part of an exhibition and events at the Dowse Art Museum, in Wellington called Ā Mua: New Lineages of Making. The work they displayed in this exhibition was Otintaai, meaning rising sun and is a garment for a woman climate warrior, referencing te Otanga, male Kiribati armour, and taeriri, a Kiribati method for making dance skirts. The item is made mostly from the New Zealand plant harakeke (flax), as traditional Kiribati fibres are not readily available in New Zealand. This art work was subsequently purchased by The Museum of New Zealand Te Papa Tongarewa, and is held in their permanent collection. As of 2022, Te Papa holds 11 items created by Humphry.

In acknowledgment of their efforts of "maintaining, reviving and promoting a Pacific heritage artform in New Zealand", Humphry and Watson received the 2019 Pacific Heritage Artist Award of $10,000 at the Arts Pasifika Awards.

Te Uru Waitākere Contemporary Gallery held an exhibition in 2019 called names held in our mouths featuring six artists including Humphry. It was about ways the artists sustain their practice, which is mostly outside of formal institutions. The exhibition also had work by Sosefina Andy, Nikau Hindin, Wikuki Kingi, Pacifica Mamas, Kaeteata Watson and The Veiqia Project, and was curated by Ioana Gordon-Smith.

In 2021 Humphry said about her weaving and art practice:

I love the magic that happens when you work and create. The idea is to know where all the skills have come from – our ancestors, who created the most intricate of objects to live and sing and dance and create the magic that is all part of our lives.

== Honour and awards ==
In 2019, Humphry won the Pacific Heritage category, with Kaetaeta Watson, at the Arts Pasifika Awards, organised by Creative New Zealand. In the 2021 Queen's Birthday Honours, she was appointed an honorary Member of the New Zealand Order of Merit, for services to the Kiribati community and culture.

== Personal life ==
Humphry is married to an Englishman, Jack Humphry, and they have several children who were born in New Zealand. They live in Thames.
