= Kaetaeta Watson =

Kiribati master weaver

- Born: Tabiteuea, Kiribati
- Citizenship: New Zealand
- Occupation: Weaver
- Awards: Pacific Heritage Artist Award (2019), Arts Pasifika Awards

Kaetaeta Watson is a master weaver from Kiribati. Her art work and collaborations advocate for and support the maintenance and transmission of Kiribati culture and heritage.

== Biography ==
Watson was born on the island of Tabiteuea in Kiribati in Eita village. In 1973 she moved to New Zealand. Watson is based in the Coromandel Peninsula.

Watson often collaborates with Louisa Humphry to create artworks. In 2021 the national museum of New Zealand Te Papa acquired into their collection a piece called Otintaai, by Watson and Louisa Humphry made from harakeke (flax), nets, and copper. At the ceremony Denise Ratieta, president of Ribanaia Women’s Club (Wellington branch) said: "Their work shows a lot of authentic artistic skill that is both inspirational and very encouraging to us I-Kiribati women."

Watson is part of a revival of weaving techniques. Part of this research is to see examples in museums, seek out traditional knowledge, and recreate the techniques applying masterful weaving skills. An example of this is a traditional suit of armour made by Watson, Chris Charteris, Lizzy Leckie and Tungaru: The Kiribati Project team. Through this research and weaving a community is strengthened, Watson says: "I think it's part of me as a Kiribati person to be ready to share, otherwise these skills won’t survive."

In 2019 Watson was awarded Pacific Heritage Artist Award at the annual Arts Pasifika Awards (Creative New Zealand) along with Louisa Humphrey.

== Exhibitions ==
- 2018 – Asia Pacific Triennial in Brisbane. Kiribati body armour – created by Chris Charteris, Lizzy Leckie, Kaetaeta Watson and Tungaru: The Kiribati Project team.
- 2019 – Names held in our mouths, Te Uru, Waitakere Contemporary Gallery. Curated by Ioana Gordon-Smith. Group exhibition with Sosefina Andy, Nikau Hindin, Louisa Humphry, Wikuki Kingi, Pacifica Mamas, Kaetaeta Watson
- 2020 – Ā Mua: New Lineages of Making, craft exhibition at The Dowse Art Museum featuring 20 makers. Presentation of Otintaai, by Kaetaeta Watson and Louisa Humphry
