= Wellesley Club Building =

The Wellesley Club Building
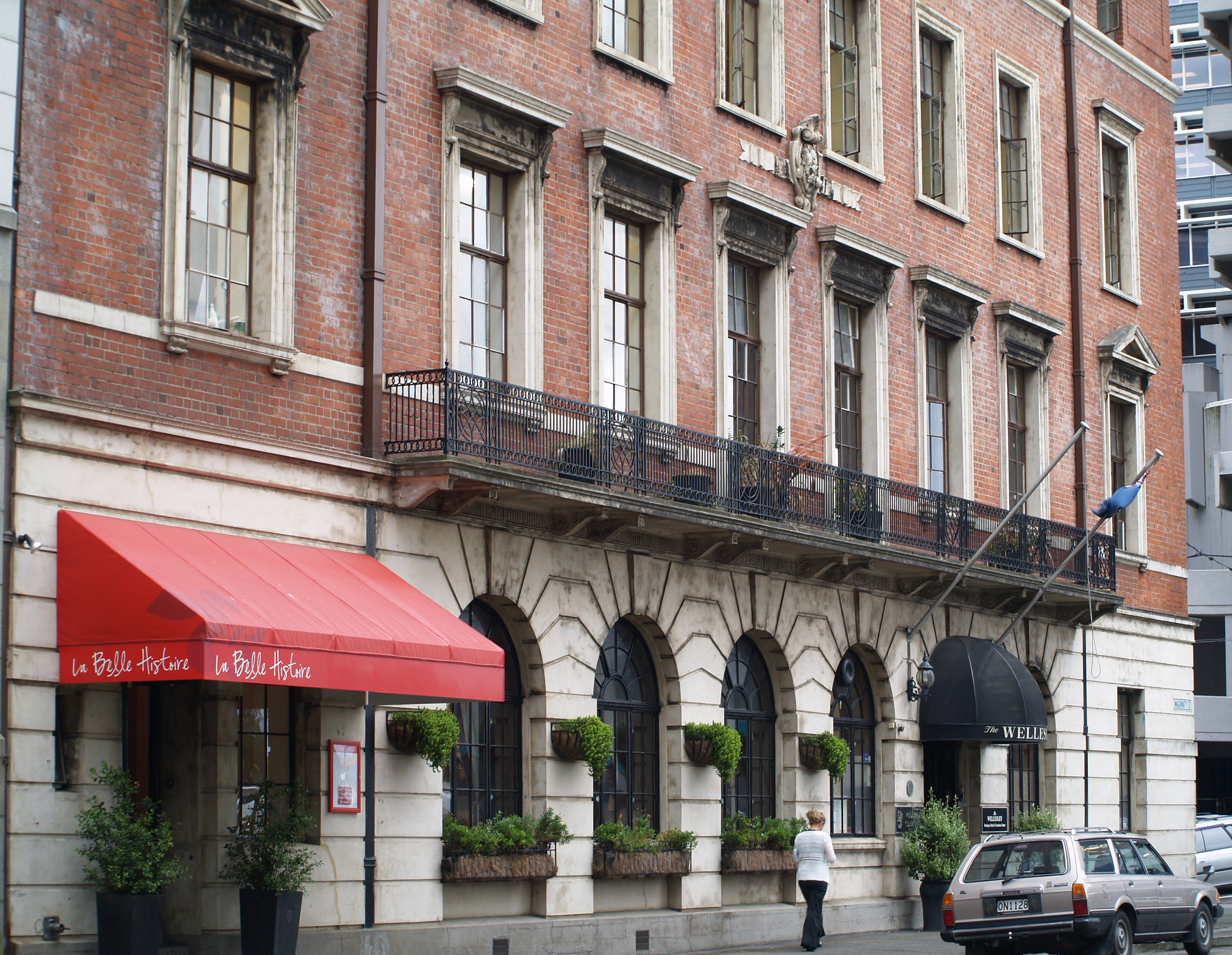
- Interactive map of the The Wellesley Club Building area

General information
- Architectural style: Neo-Georgian
- Location: 2-8 Maginnity Street, Wellington, New Zealand
- Coordinates: 41.16531°S 174.46385°E
- Completed: 1927

Design and construction
- Architect: W. Gray Young
- Awards and prizes: NZIA Gold Medal in 1932

Heritage New Zealand – Category 1
- Designated: 18 March 1982
- Reference no.: 233

The Wellesley Club building is a Category 1 historic building in Wellington, New Zealand.

It was designed by William Gray Young. Young was awarded the NZIA Gold Medal in 1932 for this building.

The building is part of the Stout Street Heritage Area, a collection of nearby heritage buildings.

It is now home to a hotel, the Wellesley Boutique Hotel.
