= Hampton Court Flats =

Hampton Court
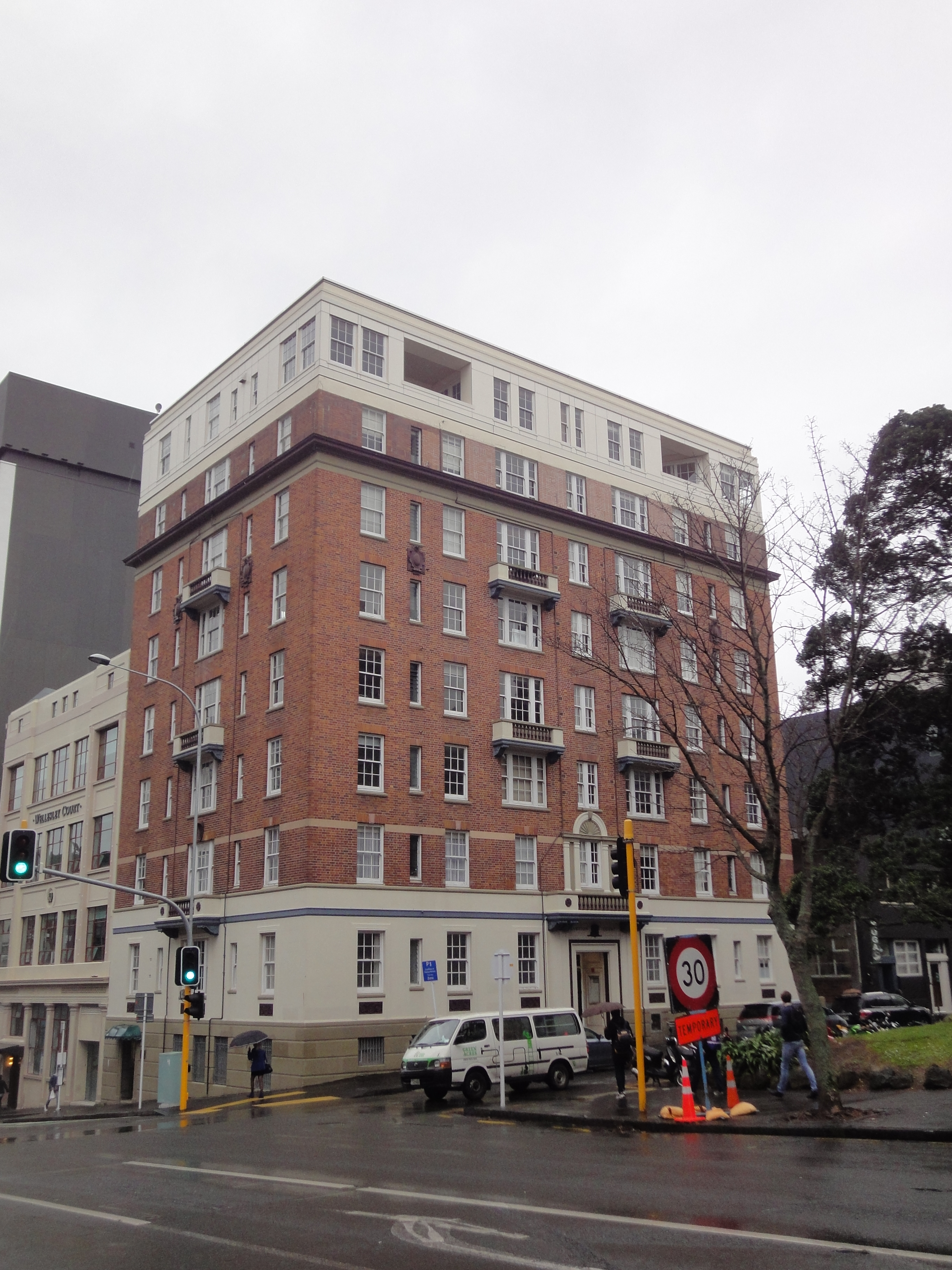
- Interactive map of the Hampton Court area

General information
- Architectural style: Neo-Georgian
- Location: 182 Federal Street And 58 Wellesley Street West, Auckland, New Zealand
- Coordinates: 36.850378°S 174.761838°E
- Completed: 1930

Design and construction
- Architect: S. S Alleman
- Awards and prizes: NZIA Gold Medal in 1930

Heritage New Zealand – Category 2
- Designated: 26 November 1981
- Reference no.: 585

Hampton Court is a historic apartment building in Auckland, New Zealand. It was designed by Surrey S. Alleman. Alleman was awarded the NZIA Gold Medal for 1930 for this building - he was 29 years old at the time. Construction of the building was announced in the NZ Herald in January 1929 for the corner of Wellesley and Lower Vincent St (as it was then known), for an estimated cost of 42,000 pounds, and the construction contract had been let to J T Julian Ltd.

The building opened in 1931, and was converted to offices in the late 1950s, when the ninth floor was added. During World War II there was a nightclub that hosted African American servicemen who were on leave, as they were not allowed into the Wintergarden or Auckland Town Hall with the white US servicemen as the US Army was segregated at that time - the club was known as the American Negro Club and featured jazz groups performing. The building was renovated in 1995 and converted back to apartments.
