= Francis Cecil Lopdell =

New Zealand teacher

Francis Cecil Lopdell (17 May 1890 – 2 September 1960) was a New Zealand teacher, soldier, school inspector, teachers' college principal and educational administrator. He was born in Wrights Bush, Southland, New Zealand on 17 May 1890. Lopdell House in Titirangi is named after him.
