= Ioana Gordon-Smith =

New Zealand Pasifika Curator and Writer

- Citizenship: New Zealand
- Occupation: Curator
- Notable work: "Yuki Kihara Aotearoa New Zealand" 59th Venice Biennale, Assistant Curator
- Website: ioanagordonsmith.com

Ioana Gordon-Smith is a New Zealand arts curator and writer. She was assistant curator for Yuki Kihara Aotearoa New Zealand at the 59th Venice Biennale and co-curator of Naadohbil: To Draw Water, an internationally touring Indigenous exhibition. She co-founded the publication Marinade: Aotearoa Journal of Moana Art to feature New Zealand artists with Pacific Island heritage.

Gordon-Smith is the curator for Māori Pacific at Pātaka Art + Museum, in Porirua, Wellington.

== Early life and education ==
Gordon-Smith grew up in New Zealand and is of Samoan and Pākehā heritage. She completed a master's degree in art history at Victoria University of Wellington; her thesis was titled: Between the Ocean and AKL: international Pacific art exhibitions in the 2000s, supervised by Peter Brunt.

Gordon-Smith was the inaugural Education Intern for Artspace Aotearoa, a role created with Tautai Contemporary Arts Trust.

== Career ==
Gordon-Smith was the first curator at newly opened Te Uru Waitakere Contemporary Gallery in Auckland in 2014, and she has been a curator at Objectspace, Ponsonby.

In 2024, Gordon-Smith was the Curator Māori Pacific at the Porirua City gallery and museum Pātaka Art + Museum, and a trustee of Enjoy Contemporary Art Space, a gallery in Wellington.

As an author, her writing has been published in Art New Zealand, Art News (New Zealand) and Un magazine. She is a regular Pasifika correspondent for Radio New Zealand.

Of the terms Pacific and Pasifika to describe the diaspora of people of the Pacific Islands, Gordan-Smith says:

The phrase ‘Oceania’ is becoming a popular alternative for ‘Pacific’ in exhibition and publication contexts to combat the colonial baggage implicit in naming in the region.

In 2017, Gordon-Smith worked on the inaugural Honolulu Biennial; the New Zealand artists were Yuki Kihara, Greg Semu, Lisa Reihana, John Vea, Fiona Pardington and Brett Graham. She made the comment that when art exhibitions focus on the 'Moana community' it allows Pacific issues to be explored in enriching ways.

At Te Uru Waitakere Contemporary Gallery in 2019 Gordon-Smith curated the exhibition names held in our mouths enabling collaborations between Kaetaeta Watson, Louisa Humphry, Sosefina Andy, The Veiqia Project and others.

Gordon-Smith was a curator of New Zealand's exhibition at the 59th Venice Biennale 2022. The exhibition was by Yuki Kihara centering a fa‘afafine perspective and made 'the intersectional argument that ‘paradise’ is a heteronormative concept, affecting fa‘afafine unevenly' and that the 'Western gaze has looked towards the Pacific and Pacific bodies for centuries.'

Gordon-Smith was one of the curators of Naadohbii: To Draw Water, an internationally touring Indigenous tri-national exhibition with artwork from Turtle Island, Australia, and Aotearoa (New Zealand). The exhibition 'illustrates an axis of solidarity between Indigenous nations across the globe around environmental, political, and cultural traditions and interconnected relationships to water'.

Gordon-Smith co-founded Marinade: Aotearoa Journal of Moana Art with Lana Lopesi that centres 'Moana arts from Aotearoa', the first issue was published in 2022.
