= Elliott House, Wellington =

Historic building in Wellington, New Zealand

Elliott House
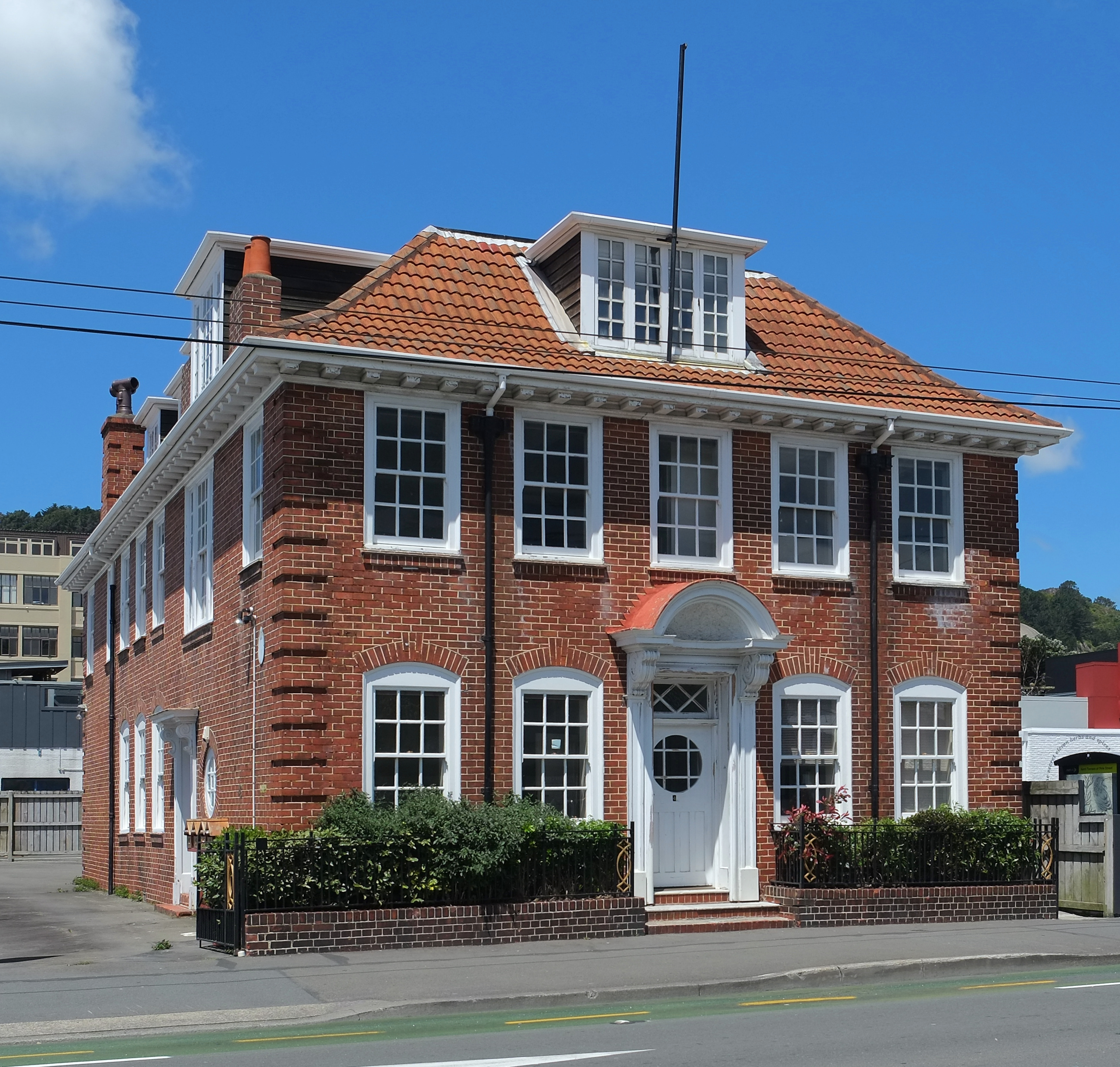
- Interactive map of the Elliott House area

General information
- Architectural style: Neo-Georgian
- Location: 43 Kent Terrace, Wellington, New Zealand
- Coordinates: 41.296866°S 174.782635°E
- Completed: 1913

Design and construction
- Architect: William Gray Young
- Main contractor: Henry J Jones and John Cameron

Heritage New Zealand – Category 1
- Designated: 20-Jul-1989
- Reference no.: 1377

Elliott House is a historic building in Wellington, New Zealand.

The house was built for James Sands Elliott, a medical professional, in 1913. The north side served as the family residence, while the Kent Terrace side served as his consultancy room and surgery. The building was renovated in 1988.

The building is classified as a Category 1 Historic Place (places of "special or outstanding historical or cultural heritage significance or value") by Heritage New Zealand.
