= William Bloomfield (architect) =

New Zealand architect (1885–1969)

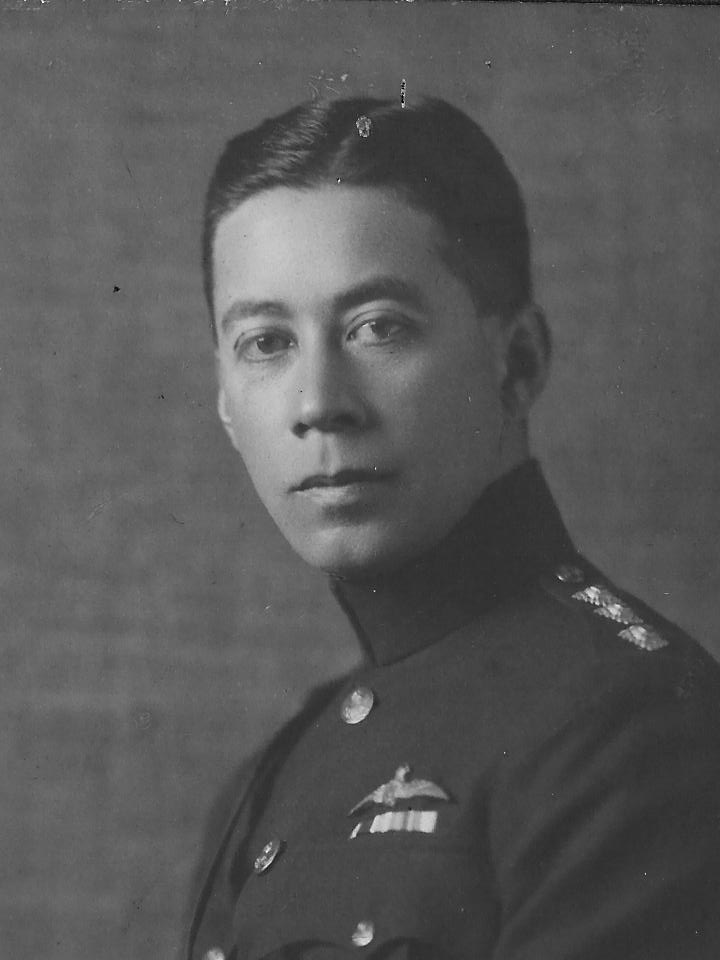
- Bloomfield in officer's uniform
- Born: William Swanson Read Bloomfield; 1885; Gisborne, Colony of New Zealand
- Died: 1 December 1969 (aged 83–84); Auckland, New Zealand
- Occupation: Architect
- Buildings: Lopdell House; Queen's Arcade, Auckland

William Swanson Read Bloomfield (1885 – 1 December 1969) was a New Zealand architect and aviator considered to be the first person of Māori descent to attend architecture school and practice as an architect. Many of his buildings are registered with Heritage New Zealand.

== Early life ==
Bloomfield, of Ngāti Kahungunu descent, was born in Gisborne, Colony of New Zealand, in 1885. His parents were Thomas E. Read Bloomfield and Mary Swanson, and they were a prominent family in Manutuke. Mary Swanson was the daughter of colonist William Swanson and Ani Rangitunoa. Bloomfield's father died when he was five years old, so his maternal grandfather was a key figure in his upbringing.

Bloomfield was one of the first New Zealanders to enrol in architecture at an American university – the University of Pennsylvania. He graduated from the University of Pennsylvania in 1913, and moved to England to study architecture.

== World Wars ==
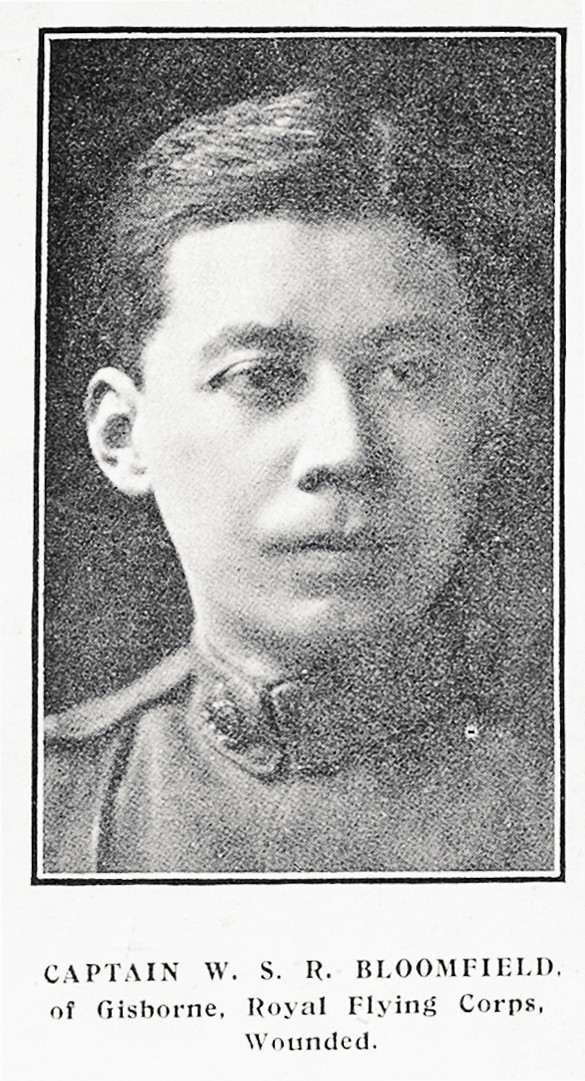
Portrait of Captain Bloomfield

While Bloomfield was studying architecture in England, World War I broke out. Bloomfield joined the Royal Flying Corps and was commissioned as an officer in October 1915. He served in World War I as a captain in 57 Squadron. A cable from 1916 directed to Bloomfield's mother reports him in the Red Cross Hospital, Rouen, with a gunshot wound to the knee. In March 1917, Bloomfield's F.E.2d was shot down behind enemy lines and he became a prisoner of war; he was held in Holzminden prisoner-of-war camp, Germany, and others. He was repatriated after the war and returned to New Zealand.

William served in World War II in the Royal New Zealand Air Force as a squadron leader and North Island divisional commander.

== Career ==
Bloomfield practised architecture in New Zealand for nearly 40 years, from the 1920s until his retirement in 1959. He first practised as part of the firm Bloomfield and Hunt and then as Bloomfield, Owen and Morgan. He engaged in many different styles, such as Chicago, Art Deco and Spanish mission, before turning to mid-century modernism later in his career.

Bloomfield designed a number of houses in the early years of his career, but his work was disrupted by the 1930s Great Depression. His work was disrupted again by World War II.

In the 1950s, Bloomfield designed a large number of residential properties. In 1954, Home & Building published a small excerpt centred on Bloomfield. It stated his interest in Italian bronzes, English and Chinese ceramics and water colours. In 1957, Bloomfield was elected a Fellow of the New Zealand Institute of Architects. He retired two years later at the age of 74.

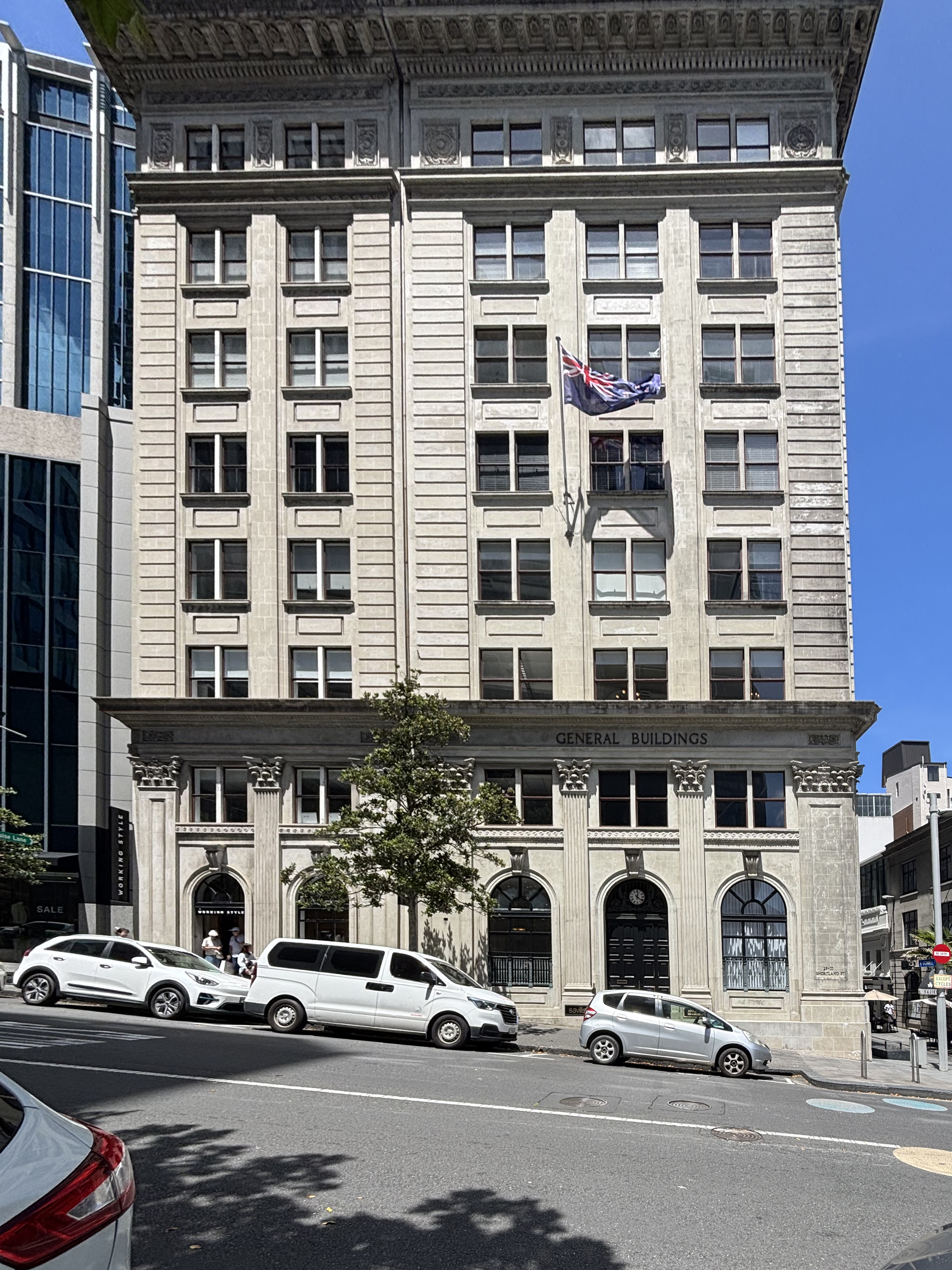
General Buildings, Auckland (including Yorkshire House)

== Notable works ==
=== Yorkshire House (1926–1928) ===
Yorkshire House was erected by the Yorkshire Insurance Company and designed by Bloomfield under the partnership Bloomfield & Hunt. The eight-storey building is an example of Chicago-style architecture and had a positive reception in Auckland when built. It was modern in its use of hot water central-heating, electric lighting and large windows, all to ensure the comfortability and longevity of work.

Yorkshire House is a Historic Place Category One registered on the New Zealand Heritage List.

=== Hotel Titirangi (1930) ===
Hotel Titirangi, now known as Lopdell House, was designed by Bloomfield under his partnership firm Bloomfield, Owen and Morgan. The hotel was built in the Spanish Mission style and could accommodate around 60 guests. The hotel was promoted as an international destination but struggled to function due to the onset of the Great Depression.

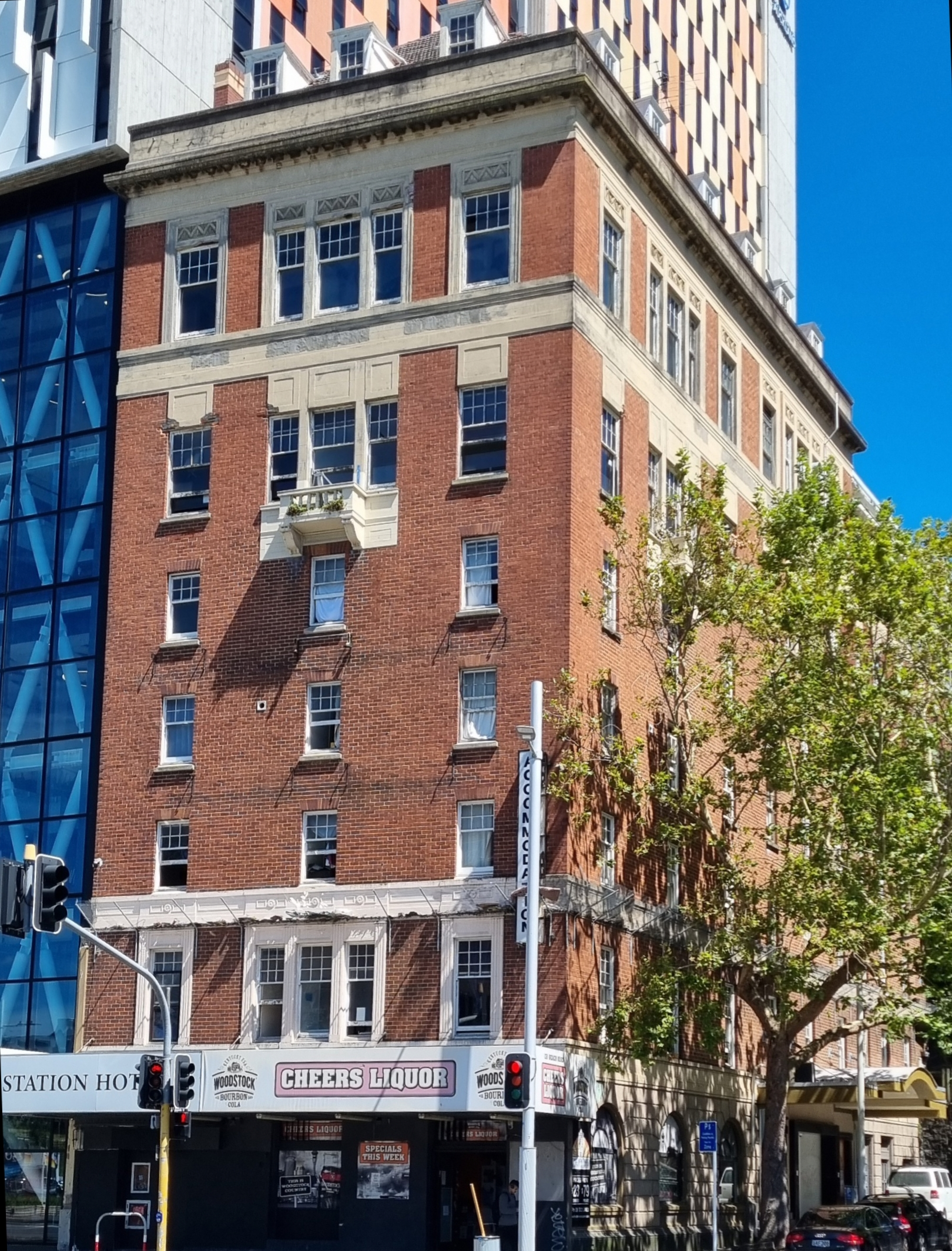
Former Station Hotel

Hotel Titirangi (former), in addition to its connected Treasure House and Te Uru Gallery, is a Historic Place Category One registered on the New Zealand Heritage List.

=== Station Hotel (former) on Beach Road (1930–1931) ===
Station Hotel was built to complement the new Auckland railway station across the road. The developers wanted to construct a hotel to American standards, and having studied in America, Bloomfield understood their standards for commercial hospitality. It was one of the few buildings constructed during the Great Depression. Included in the design are Art Deco capitals with references to Māori designs. In the 1930s, the building was known to be frequented by Labour members of parliament and in the 1940s, by American soldiers.

Station Hotel is a Historic Place Category Two registered on the New Zealand Heritage List.

=== Binney House (1935) ===
Binney House is located in Parnell, Auckland, and was built in 1935 in the Arts and Crafts style. Bloomfield designed Binney House for woolbroker and auctioneer, Edwin Heselden Binney and his wife Mary. Built around the end of the Great Depression of the 1930s, this house was one of Bloomfield's first designs as New Zealand began to rebound from the recession. A key feature of Bloomfield's design is its Marseilles tile roof.

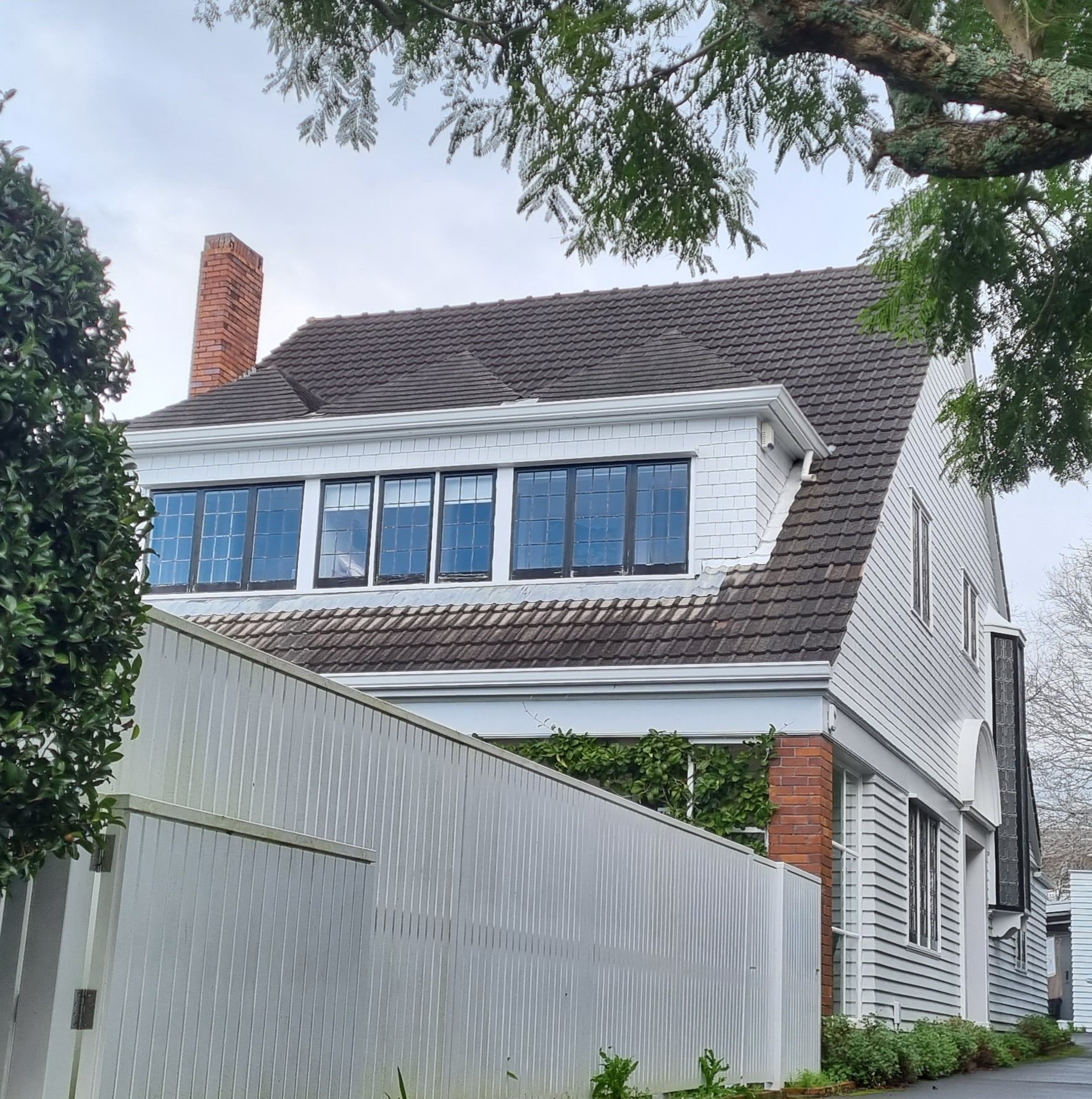
Binney House

Binney House is a Historic Place Category Two registered on the New Zealand Heritage List.

=== Other ===
Other notable works by Bloomfield are the Georgian-style Queen's Arcade (1928–1929), the Masonic Temple on St Benedict's Street (1929–1930), Auckland Aero Clubhouse, and St Augustine's Church, Devonport (1930). The Arts and Crafts style St Augustine's Church contained a memorial commemorating local men who died in World War I, which included Bloomfield's brother-in-law. It is another one of Bloomfield's designs on the Historic Place Category Two.

== Personal life ==
In 1929, Bloomfield married Rhoda Gribbin at Holy Trinity Church, Devonport. Bloomfield was a foundational member of the Auckland Aero Club.
