= Stanley Fearn =

New Zealand architect

Stanley W. Fearn (1887–1976) was a New Zealand architect in the early 20th century, a contemporary of W. Gray Young and at one time was in partnership with Gray Young and Austin Quick. Fearn's work is distinguished for his houses in the English Vernacular style.

== Life ==
Fearn was a British-born, Wellington-based architect with a long career spanning a large part of the 20th century and incorporating a wide range of styles. He was still working as late as the 1960s.

Most of Fearn;'s work was domestic, but he designed a range of buildings, both in the capital, where he designed over 70 buildings, and further afield. In Wellington he is best known for the William Booth Memorial Training College in Aro Street (1913), which he designed with Austin Quick. This building won the first ever gold medal from the NZ Institute of Architects in 1927.

Fearn's houses include the Frederic Wallis House, Lower Hutt, the grand country house Rototawai, near Featherston, New Zealand, 82 Bolton Street as well as houses in Hobson Street, Thorndon. He was involved in the rebuilding of Napier and Hastings after the Hawkes Bay earthquake and among his surviving designs is the former Bestall's Building, Napier (1932). His son Detmar was also an architect.

== Gallery of his work ==
82 Bolton St, Wellington

Ministerial Residence (Former), Wellington

== Notable works ==
- William Booth Memorial Training College, Wellington (1913)
- Public Trust Office, Hastings (1926)
- Cambridge Pharmacy, Wellington (1932)
- Dominion Arcade, Wellington (1959)
- Frederic Wallis House, Lower Hutt (1927)
- Rototawai, Martinborough (1929)
- Bestall's Building, Napier (1932)
- 82 Bolton Street, Wellington (1924)
