= W. Gray Young =

New Zealand architect (1885–1962)

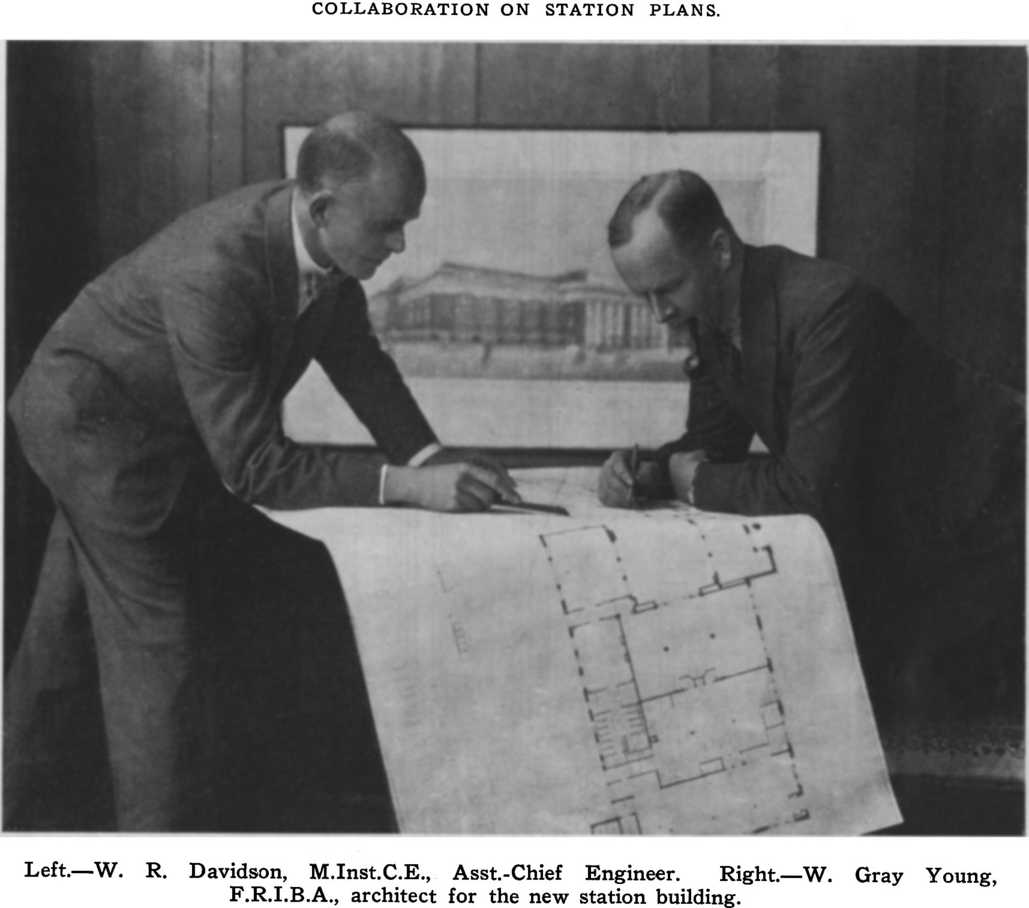
W. Gray Young (right)

William Gray Young (21 June 1885 – 21 April 1962) was a New Zealand architect in the early 20th century, designing buildings such as Knox College in Dunedin, the Wellington railway station and Wellington's Elliott House. He was president of the New Zealand Institute of Architects from 1935 to 1937.

== Early Life ==
Born in Oamaru to a Presbyterian family, he was the son of a Scottish watchmaker and jewellery retailer, moving with his family to Wellington in the 1890s. He attended the Terrace School and Wellington College, and went on to be articled to the architects Crichton and McKay. He won the competition for Knox College in Dunedin in 1906 when he was only 21, entering private practice shortly after his newfound success. He became an associate of the New Zealand Institute of Architects (NZIA) in 1907.

== Career and later life ==
Prior to the First World War, he worked in collaboration with Stanley Fearn and Austin Quick. Gray Young and his partners designed and oversaw the construction of an average of six houses a year between 1907 and 1962.

Gray Young is credited by many for reviving Georgian architecture in New Zealand with the design of Elliott House in 1913. He would go on to become one of the most accomplished in the style, matched only in skill to his biggest rival (and personal friend), Cecil Wood of Canterbury. His work in the Georgian and Domestic revival are his most well known with many surviving examples across Wellington, particularly concentrated in the North Wellington suburbs of Kelburn, Thorndon, Wadestown, and Khandallah.

He was judged unfit for military service in the First World War and continued in practice through it. With John Swan he designed Wellington Technical College in 1919. The same year his Scots College building was opened and in 1928 the Wellesley Club which earned him the NZIA gold medal. He designed the new Wellington railway station in 1930.

Gray Young was one of the architects invited to work with the government architect designing the prototype state house. He designed a new railway station for Christchurch in 1938 but it was not built until 1960. He also designed the Easterfield building at Victoria University of Wellington in 1951.

As architectural adviser to Knox College, Gray Young presided over its slow elaboration until 1952. Later architects continued to work to realise and elaborate his original idea for decades after his death, an unusual outcome in New Zealand, even for a highly emblematic building.

He was elected a Fellow of the New Zealand Institute of Architects in 1913 at just 27, becoming the youngest man in New Zealand to do so. He served on the executive committee from 1914 to 1935 and was its president from 1935 to 1937. In 1935, he was awarded the King George V Silver Jubilee Medal.

He was president of the Wellington Rotary Club from 1935 to 1936 but did not care for public life, preferring the company of colleagues and a group of yachting friends. He died in Wellington in April 1962.

== Gallery of his work ==
Elliott House, Wellington

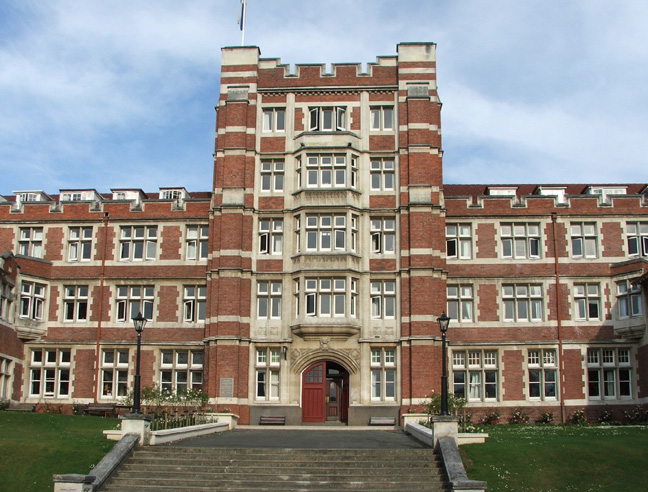
Knox College, Dunedin

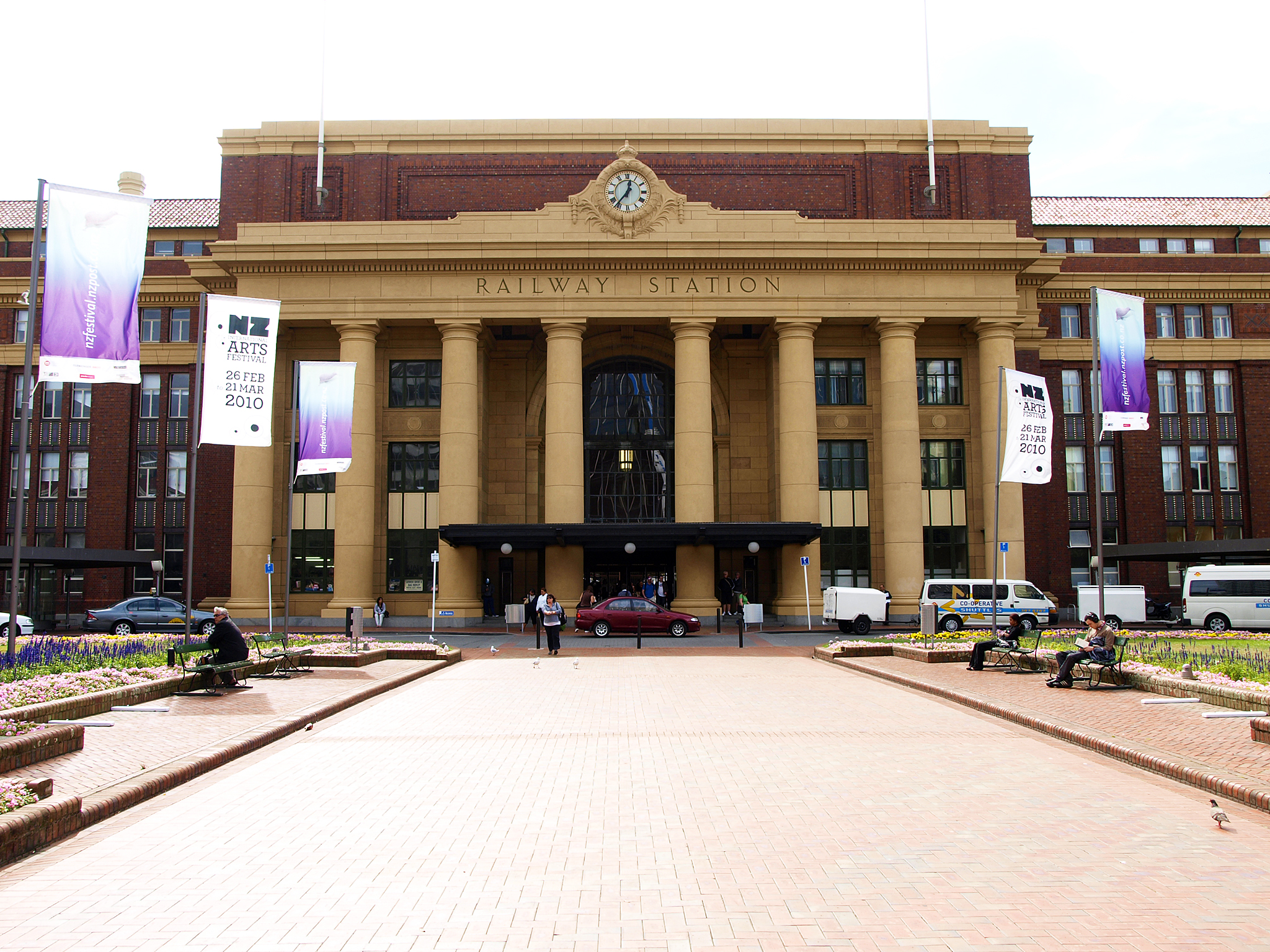
Wellington railway station

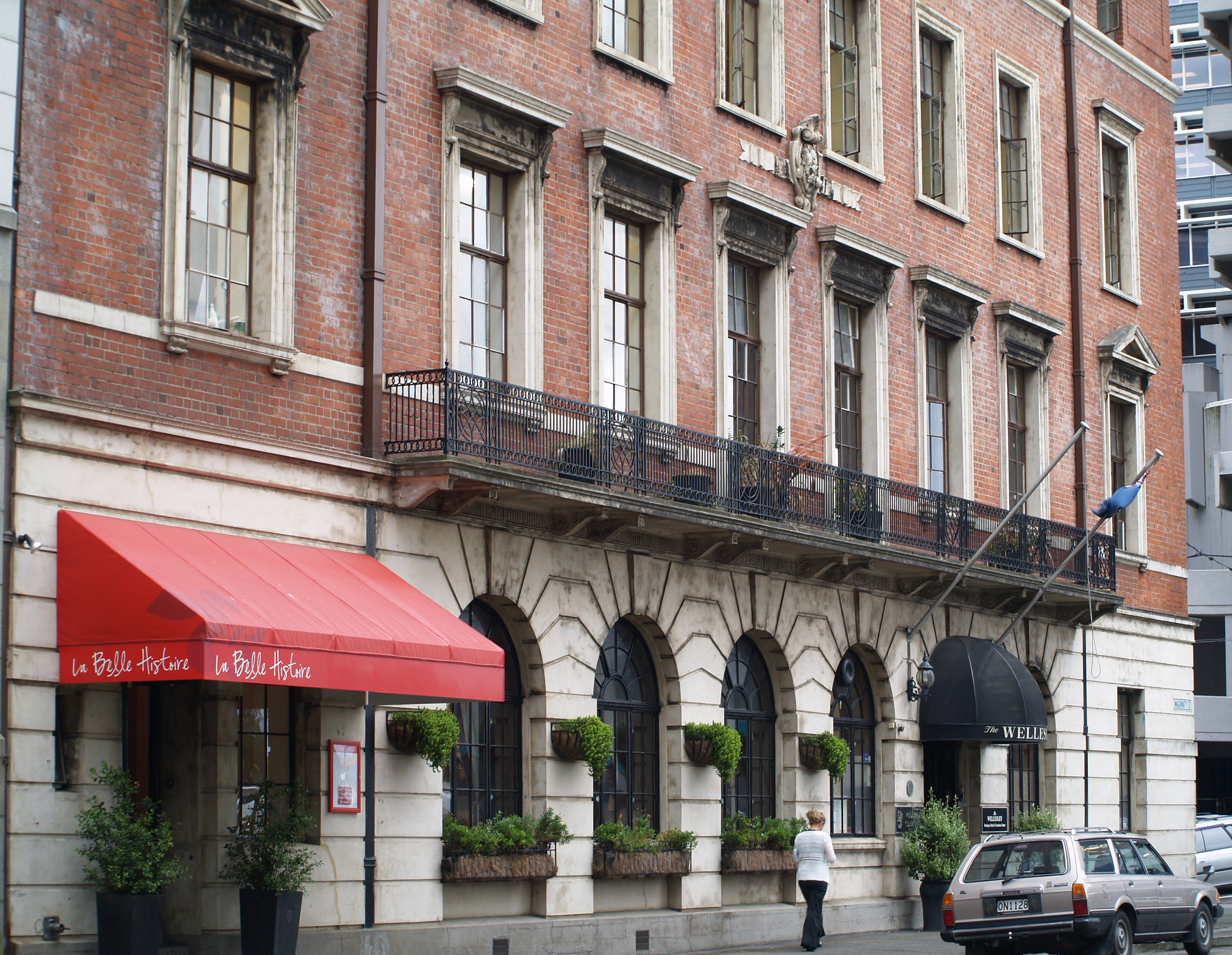
Wellesley Club, Wellington

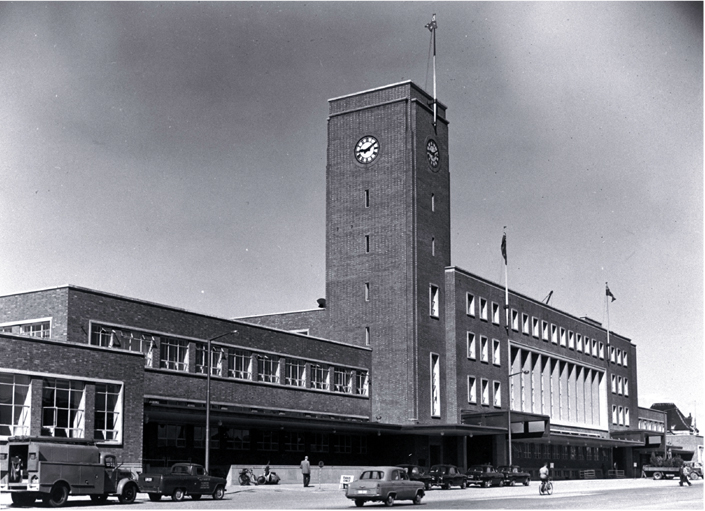
Christchurch railway station

Weir House (VUW), Wellington

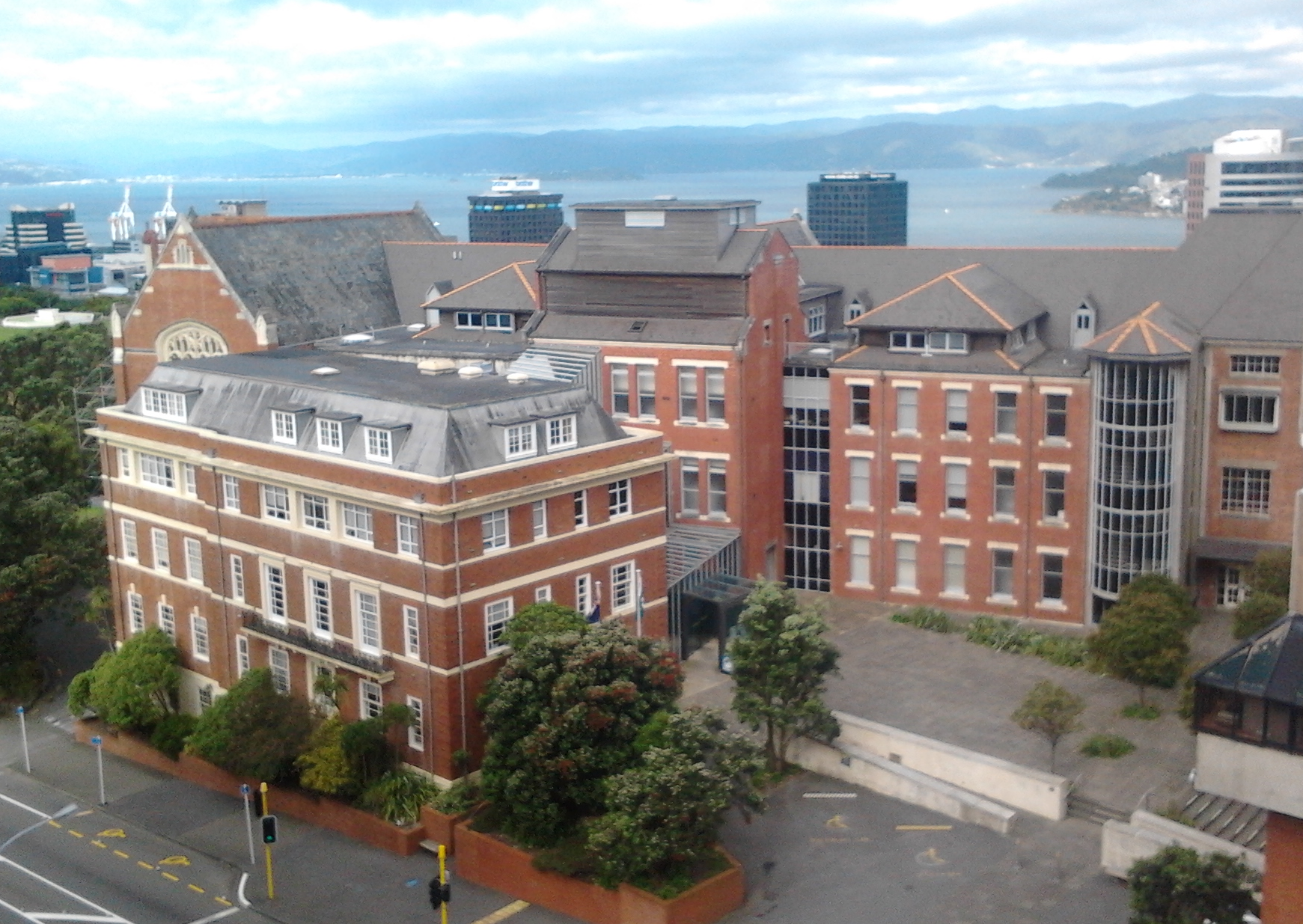
Stout Building, Victoria University, Wellington (on the left)

Carter Observatory, Wellington

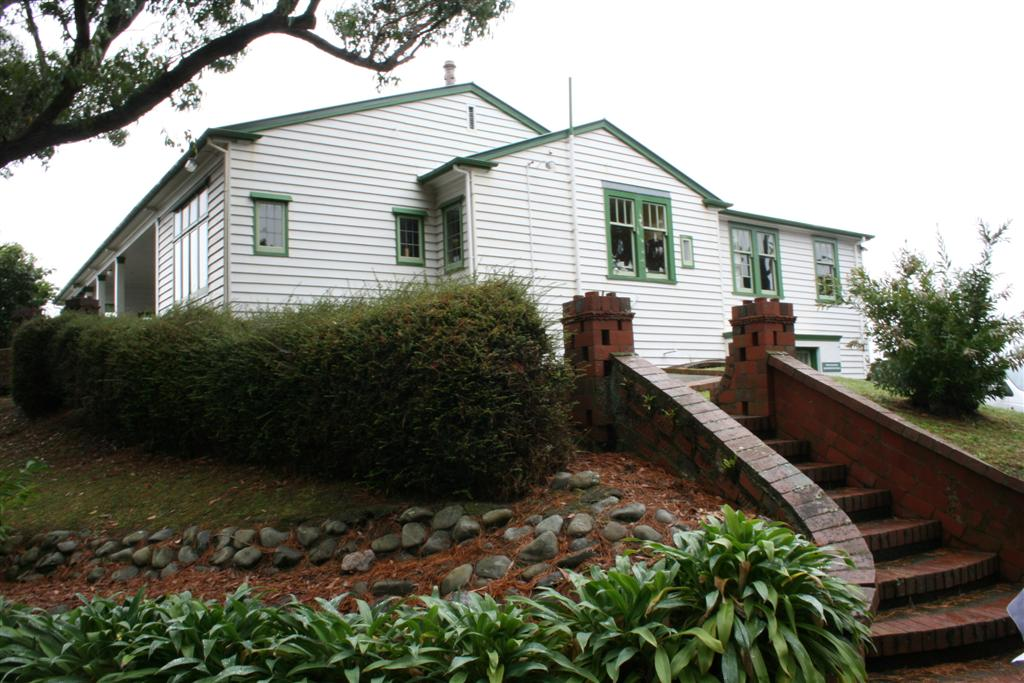
Truby King House, Wellington

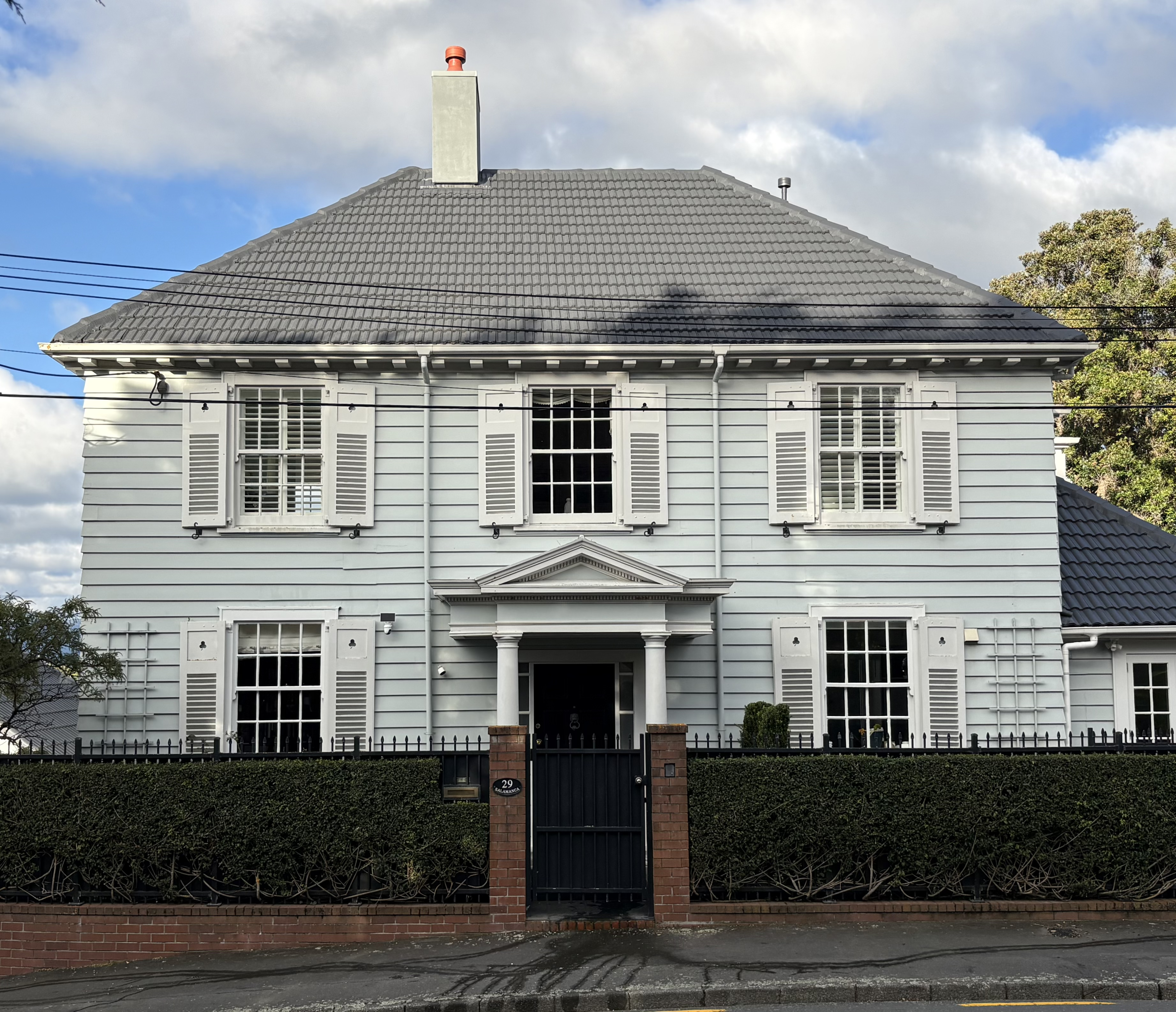
(Former) Dean of Law house, Wellington

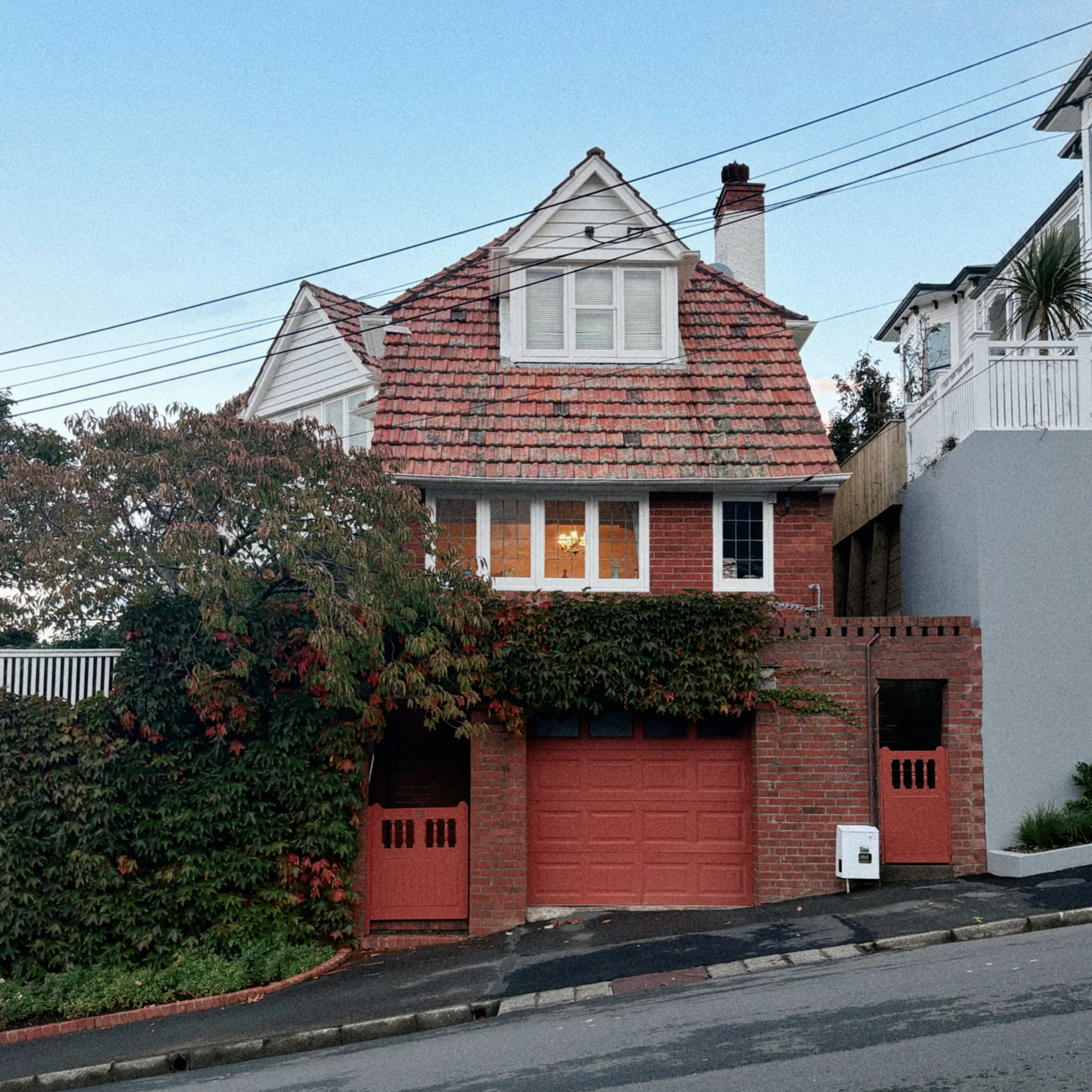
House designed for T.A. Hunter, Wellington

Dr A. Young House (Former), Wellington

House in Thorndon, Wellington

Niue High Commission, Wellington

== Notable works ==
- Knox College, Dunedin (1909–1952)
- Elliott House, Wellington (1913).
- Everybody's Theatre, Christchurch (1915).
- Scot's College, Wellington (1919).
- Wellington Technical College, Wellington (1919) with John Swan.
- Truby King House, Wellington (1923)
- Wellesley Club, Wellington (1927)
- Phoenix Assurance Building (1930)
- Stout Building, Victoria University, Wellington (1930)
- Weir House, Victoria University, Wellington (1933), Victoria University's first hall of residence.
- Wellington railway station (1937)
- Kirk Building, Victoria University, Wellington (1938)
- Carter Observatory Building, Wellington (1941)
- Australian Mutual Provident Society (AMP) Chambers (1950)
- Easterfield Building, Victoria University, Wellington (1957)
- Christchurch railway station (opened in 1960)

== Sources ==
- AJ Salmond, Knox College Conservation Plan 2004, Salmond Anderson Ltd., Dunedin, 2003.
