= Marshall Cook =

New Zealand architect (1940–2023)

Marshall Cook FNZIA
- Born: Marshall Thomas Cook; 1940
- Died: 28 September 2023 (aged 83); Auckland, New Zealand
- Education: University of Auckland
- Occupation: Architect
- Awards: NZIA Gold Medal (2010)
- Practice: Cook Hitchcock & Sargisson; Cook Hitchcock & Pirie

Marshall Thomas Cook FNZIA (1940 – 28 September 2023) was a New Zealand architect, urban planner and educator based in Auckland, known primarily for residential architecture. He was awarded the NZIA Gold Medal in 2010.

== Career ==
Born in 1940, Cook was raised in Napier, and began studying architecture at the University of Auckland in 1959. He took time out during his studies, and worked with architects including Bill Wilson, Ivan Juriss, John Scott and Lillian Chrystall, before completing his architectural degree in 1966. He established a practice with Terry Hitchcock the following year, and later Peter Sargisson joined them, the practice being known as Cook Hitchcock and Sargisson until 1990.

During the 1970s, Cook spent three years teaching timber construction in the United Kingdom. After he returned to New Zealand in the late 1970s, Cook's practice was involved in several ski resort and master planning projects in North America, as well as projects in Thailand and Japan. It is, however, as an architect of residential houses that Cook is best known. His houses have been called "highly civilised and experimental at the same time", and "inventive in their approach to structure and construction".

In 2001, Cook directed the establishment of the Housing New Zealand healthy homes programme, which sought to upgrade and modernise state housing in New Zealand. He contributed to the architectural profession, as a juror for local, regional and national architectural awards, as a member of the New Zealand Institute of Architects (NZIA) national council, and as an adjunct professor of design at Unitec Institute of Technology. In 2010, he was awarded the NZIA Gold Medal, in recognition of his contribution to architecture in New Zealand over a period of more than 40 years. He was also a Fellow of the New Zealand Institute of Architects.

Cook died on 28 September 2023, at the age of 83.
