= Tauranga Art Gallery =

- Established: 2007
- Location: Western Bay of Plenty District, New Zealand
- Coordinates: 37.6831°S 176.1691°E
- Type: Art gallery
- Owner: Tauranga Art Gallery Trust

Tauranga Art Gallery an arts gallery located in the Western Bay of Plenty District, New Zealand. The gallery exhibits historical and contemporary art.

== History ==
In 1999 the Tauranga Art Gallery Trust purchased the former Bank of New Zealand building located on the corner of Willow and Wharf Streets. In 2006, the building was refurbished by Watts and Hughes Construction. Construction was completed in May 2007. The building provides 1,300 square metres of floor space, over two levels, with 700 square metres of exhibition space. Tauranga Art Gallery was officially opened by Prime Minister Helen Clark on 20 October 2007.
