= Lopdell House =

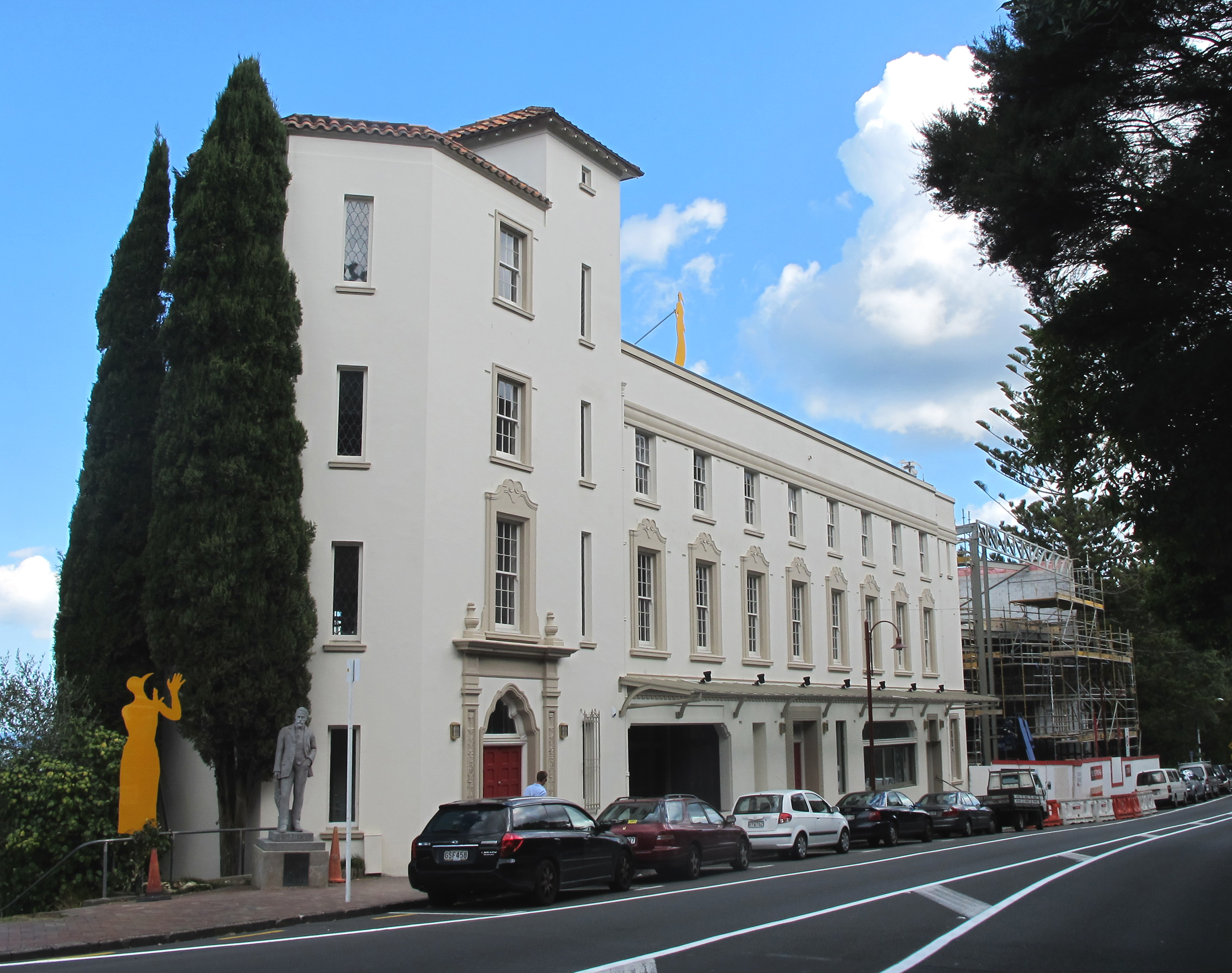
- Lopdell House following the earthquake strengthening and renovation completed in 2014
- Former names: Hotel Titirangi, Frank Lopdell House, Waitemata City Arts Centre and Waitakere Arts and Cultural Centre

General information
- Type: Arts Centre
- Architectural style: Spanish Mission
- Location: 418 Titirangi Rd, Titirangi, Auckland
- Coordinates: 36°56′17″S 174°39′20″E
- Current tenants: Te Uru Waitakere Contemporary Gallery (offices), Titirangi Community Arts Council (Upstairs Art Gallery), Titirangi Theatre, McCahon House (office)
- Completed: 1930
- Renovated: 2012–2014
- Owner: Auckland Council
- Landlord: Lopdell Trust

Design and construction
- Architect: William Swanson Read Bloomfield

Heritage New Zealand – Category 1
- Designated: 9 December 2020
- Reference no.: 9823

Lopdell House is a category I historic building in Titirangi, Auckland. It opened as Hotel Titirangi in 1930. In 1942 it was bought by the Ministry of Education and became a school for the deaf, and then a teacher's residential centre named Lopdell House. The Waitemata City Council (later Waitakere City Council and then merged with Auckland Council) purchased it in 1983 and leased it to the Lopdell House Society, who reopened in 1986 as an arts centre. Adjacent to the house is a statue of Titirangi founder, Henry Atkinson.

== Design ==
The architects of Hotel Titirangi were Messrs Bloomfield, Owen and Morgan of Auckland. Of these, William Swanson Read Bloomfield, based on Shortland Street, was one of the original directors of the Hotel Titirangi Ltd company. He was born in Gisborne and is considered to be the first qualified New Zealand architect of Māori descent, having trained in England, Europe and at the University of Pennsylvania, USA. Bloomfield retired in 1959 and is also known for the design of Queen's Arcade (Queen St), Yorkshire House (cnr Shortland and O'Connell Sts) and the Masonic Temple (St Benedict's St)

Designed in a Spanish Mission style to accommodate over 60 guests, Hotel Titirangi was noted for having central heating, hot and cold water in every bedroom, and private bathrooms attached to five of the 24 bedrooms, all of which were fully carpeted. The building also had tea-rooms, two shops, a post office, a roof garden and a garage below. The main room on the ground floor was a tearoom and cabaret, running the whole length of the building to accommodate 200 people, with a dining room on the first floor. The cabaret featured a special dance floor laid down on rubber buffers. Particularly innovative was the installation of a "Wireless and Talking Machine", which allowed music or talking to be simultaneously broadcast to the cabaret, roof garden and all landings.

In 1935, alterations were undertaken to add a new lounge on the roof, to enlarge the tearoom and dining room, and to convert a shop in the building to a private dining room. The work was carried out by P. W. Peate and the architect was L. S. Piper.

== Hotel Titirangi ==
On 2 September 1928, the company Hotel Titirangi Ltd was established to purchase a property and tearooms from W. A. Bishop for 3,000 pounds in order to establish a modern hotel. The company was established with 50,000 pounds capital, divided into 50,000 shares, and is said to have issued 2000 shares to local residents. The hotel was built to capitalise on Titirangi tourism, particularly daytrippers from Auckland. The initial company prospectus describes the significance of the location, noting that "all roads converge at this point, consequently a large volume of holiday and week-end traffic, as well as a smaller stream during the week, must all pass right by the Hotel on its way to the beaches, Atkinson Park, Huia, Cornwallis, Laingholm, Exhibition Drive, Kaurilands and Mt Atkinson."

Early reports described the addition of a hotel as making "Titirangi the equivalent to Auckland of what the Blue Mountains are to Sydney, with the advantage that one resort is half-an-hour's run from the city and [the] other 100 miles." The first Hotel Titirangi Limited AGM in 1929 confirmed that the contract for building the hotel had been let to P. W. Peate for 20,000 pounds, and that sufficient progress was anticipated by mid-1930 so a certain amount of accommodation could be made available.

Hotel Titirangi was officially opened on the afternoon of 20 November 1930 by former Prime Minister and then Kaipara MP, Gordon Coates, followed by an invitation-only evening ball. The opening was attended by nearly 300 people.

By early March 1931, the Hotel Titirangi company was put into liquidation, blamed on "the present dull times." The Hotel never secured an alcohol license, becoming known as the 'pub with no beer', and struggled to attract patrons, most business being done by the restaurant and tea rooms – a nightclub was added towards the end of the decade but struggled without a license. In December 1934, Sheila MacDonald, daughter of the British Prime Minister, was entertained by Auckland Branch of the Federation of University Women at the hotel. In July 1939, the then owner-occupier of the hotel, Leonard James Shrubsall (Mr Finlay) was charged and fined for deliberately selling alcohol without a license in a no-license area, and a large quantity of liquor was confiscated.

In 1939, George Hunter took over the lease and changed the building's name to the Titirangi Country Club, occupied by his wife, family and other relatives, and managed by Max Hunter. It was established as a country club for members, who were allowed to introduce guests that could use amenities such as tennis courts, a ping pong table etc., and it was proposed that, as a dwelling for Hunter and his family, it is exempt from licensing regulations that would apply to a restaurant or public dance hall, but a police raid and subsequent case in 1941 proved otherwise.

== School for the Deaf ==
In June 1942, Hotel Titirangi was purchased by the government for use as a residential school for the deaf. More than 60 students arrived in September 1942 while alterations were still in progress. The principal was H. Pickering who also remained principal of the South Island facility at Sumner, Christchurch, previously the only such school in the country. There were playing fields for the children in the location now occupied by the War Memorial Hall, Library and RSA. In 1947, a small post office was built beside Lopdell House, on the corner of Titirangi and South Titrangi Roads, and it was locally known as the '"root'n toot'n show" due to just being two worker's huts. In 1960, the school transferred to purpose-built premises in Glen Eden.

== Lopdell House ==
After functioning as a school for the deaf, the building was used by the Department of Education for in-service teacher training. It was renamed Lopdell House in 1960 after the Department of Education's former Superintendent, Frank Lopdell, who had died that year, and became the department's first residential in-service teacher training facility, offering week-long training courses. Music courses for primary school teachers were a particular feature of the in-service teacher-training programme. One course aimed to instruct up to 35 teachers to play simple melodies on a range of instruments in as little as two days, which was described in a Southland News report as a “mild revolution” in music pedagogy.

== Lopdell House Society ==
Lopdell House was vacated in 1982 and purchased by the Waitemata City Council. It was then leased to Lopdell House Society in early 1985. Later in 1985, the Titirangi Drama club (now Titirangi Theatre) took up a separate lease with Waitemata City Council for the sub-basement, which they held until 2012. Titirangi Theatre still operates to this day.

On 19 November 1986, Lopdell House Society reopened the building as the Waitemata City Arts Centre, later becoming the Waitakere Arts and Cultural Centre after the formation of Waitakere City, and then simply known as Lopdell House. Offices were rented out on the top floor and significant additions were made to the rooftop and, for a period, a restaurant operated in the rooftop extension. Toward the end of 1990, the Lopdell House Management Committee established a community gallery on the first floor, which was then administered by the Titirangi Community Arts Council and became known as the Upstairs Art Gallery. Lopdell House Society ran the main gallery on the ground floor, which became officially known as Lopdell House Gallery from 1994, with their offices above. They managed the building until the start of a major redevelopment in 2012 and sublet other spaces to other organisations including McCahon House and Upstairs Art Gallery.

In 2014, Lopdell House Society adopted a new name, Te Uru Waitakere Contemporary Gallery, or Te Uru, which refers to the wind that blows from the west, a name that comes from local Maori tribe, Te Kawerau ā Maki.

== Lopdell Precinct ==
In 2002 the Lopdell House Arts Development Trust was established to work with Waitakere Council (later Auckland Council) on a redevelopment of the building. With a feasibility study and concept plans approved in 2006, Waitakere City confirmed $2 million towards more detailed planning and further work, triggering the dissolution of the initial trust and the establishment of a new trust, the Lopdell House Development Trust, to undertake the next phase of development. The $20m redevelopment was funded with $12.3 million from Auckland Council and further funds from the Trusts Community Foundation, ASB Community Trust and the New Zealand Lotteries Commission.

Construction work began in 2012 and all tenants moved out, leaving the Lopdell House Development Trust to take over the lease from Lopdell House Society and become the developers of a new precinct, a project that included refurbishment, restoration and earthquake strengthening of Lopdell House and the addition of a new, purpose-built contemporary gallery building alongside as part of a larger precinct along with the Treasure House behind. As part of the building's refurbishment, the exterior paint was returned to its original white, having been khaki green for a period and also salmon pink. Another feature of the restoration, designed by Mitchell and Stout Architects, was the removal of rooftop additions from 1935 and the 1980s, to reinstate the rooftop terrace. The Lopdell House refurbishment was completed and the building reopened on Saturday 1 March 2014.

Te Uru, the new contemporary gallery next door opened to the public on Saturday 1 November 2014.
