= Te Uru Waitākere Contemporary Gallery =

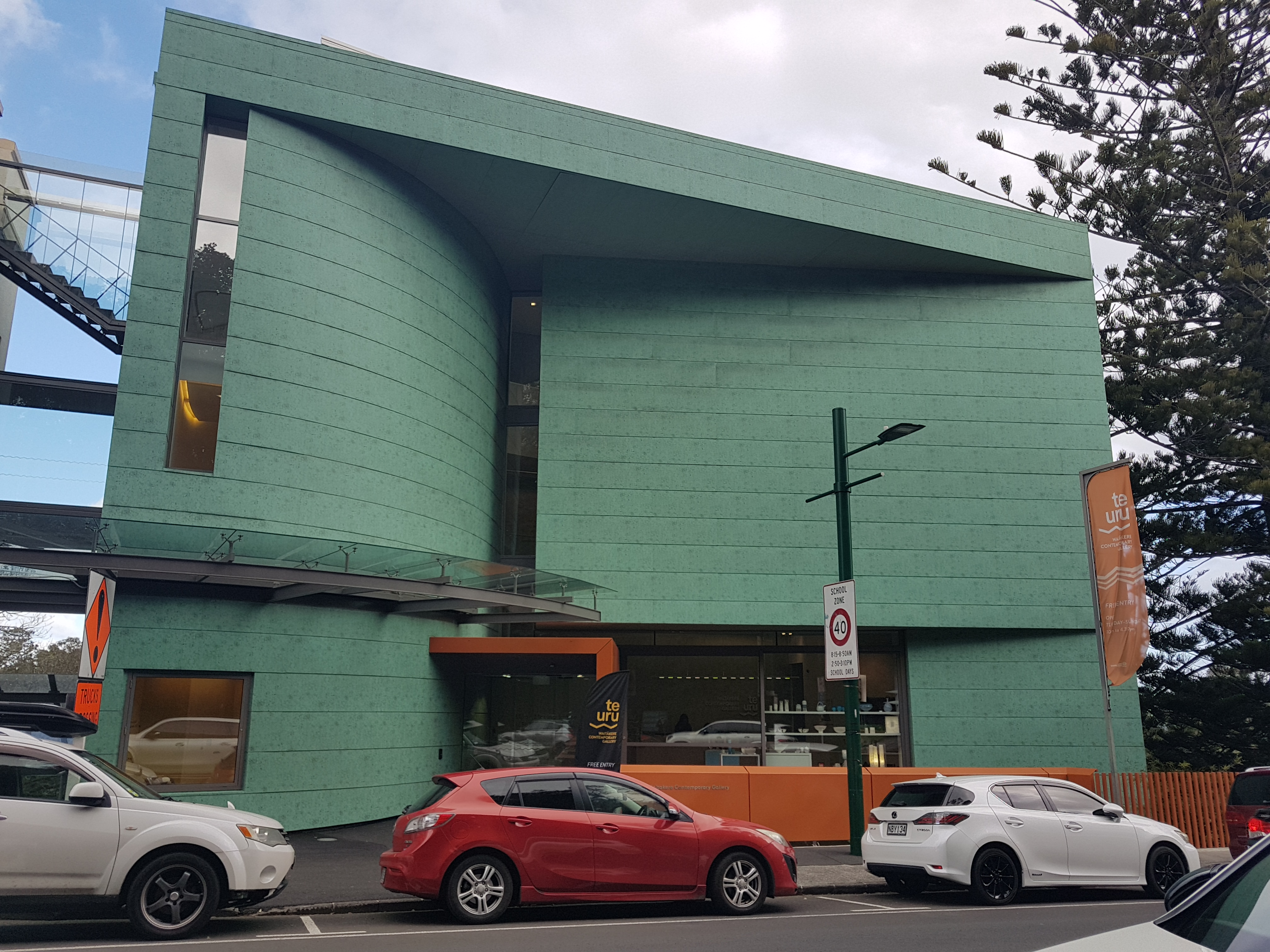
- Interactive map of the Te Uru Waitākere Contemporary Gallery area
- Former names: Lopdell House Gallery

General information
- Type: Art Gallery
- Location: 420 Titirangi Road, Auckland, New Zealand
- Coordinates: 36.938244°S 174.655171°E
- Current tenants: Te Uru
- Construction started: 2012
- Completed: 2014

Technical details
- Floor count: 6

Design and construction
- Architects: Mitchell & Stout Architects
- Awards: NZIA Public Architecture Award 2015, Shortlisted for World Architecture Festival 2015

Website
- www.teuru.org.nz

Te Uru Waitākere Contemporary Gallery (commonly known as Te Uru, formerly known as Lopdell House Gallery) is a contemporary art gallery located in Titirangi, Auckland. The gallery, which serves the West Auckland region, was originally opened within Lopdell House in 1986.

== Redevelopment ==
The gallery closed in 2012 for a building project, with the new custom-built gallery, designed by Julie Stout of Mitchell & Stout Architects, opening on 1 November 2014. The building project received a warm critical reception and has received awards in the 2015 Auckland Architecture Awards Public Building and Heritage categories, and the 2015 New Zealand Architecture Awards Public Building category.

Te Uru's inaugural director was Andrew Clifford, who was appointed in 2013. Clifford's departure was announced at the end of 2022, and he took on his next role as Director of the Sarjeant Gallery in March 2023, after serving as director for 10 years. The inaugural curator was Ioana Gordon-Smith.

=== Name change ===
The name of the gallery references the Māori phrase Te Hau a Uru (wind from the west), meaning the air currents the West Auckland (Waitākere/Hikurangi) area is known for. The name was chosen in consultation with local iwi Te Kawerau ā Maki.

== Exhibitions ==
Te Uru hosts the annual Portage Ceramic Awards, New Zealand's premier prize for ceramics. Many external curators have realised independent projects at Te Uru and Lopdell House Gallery, including Ron Brownson, Karl Chitham, Moyra Elliot, Douglas Lloyd-Jenkins, Haru Sameshima, Peter Simpson, Linda Tyler and Ian Wedde. Damian Skinner was curator of the exhibitions Hattaway, Schoon, Walters: Madness and Modernism (1997) and Steve Rumsey and the Camera Club Movement 1948-64 (2003).

Major exhibitions staged since the gallery's 2014 re-opening include Seung Yul Oh's HaPoom, Janet Lilo's Janet Lilo: Status Update, Caroline McQuarrie's No Town, and Judy Millar's site-specific installation The Model World.

To mark Roy Good's 50 years of art career, the gallery had a major retrospective of Good's work titled Parallel Universe: The Art and Design of Roy Good that ran from 1 December 2018 to 10 February 2019. The exhibition was curated by Ed Hanfling. The exhibition was accompanied by a publication authored by Hanfling with contributions by Andrew Paul Wood and Andrew Clifford.

In May 2023, there was a major exhibition of Andy Leleisi'uao, titled Unbeautiful Evening, where some of his damaged works were affected by the catastrophic 2023 Auckland Anniversary Weekend floods are displayed.
