= Margaret Munro =

New Zealand architect (1914–2005)

- Born: Margaret Staples Hamilton; 28 October 1914; New Zealand
- Died: 26 April 2005 (aged 90)
- Occupation: Architect
- Father: Edwin Hamilton
- Buildings: St Stephen's Church, Ashburton, New Zealand

Margaret Staples Munro (née Hamilton, 28 October 1914 – 26 April 2005), was a New Zealand architect. She was the first female architect to establish a career in the Canterbury region.

== Biography ==
=== Early life ===
Munro was born in Christchurch on 28 October 1914, one of five children to parents Sybil Jameson and Edwin Hamilton, a sharebroker who was heavily involved in the Anglican church. Munro was related by marriage to two architects, her great-aunt Agnes Wood (1840–1922) was married to the architect Richard Norman Shaw and her mother's cousin, Cecil Wood, was "Canterbury's best known architect in the 'twenties and 'thirties".

Munro's family lived at Amwell on Papanui Road in Christchurch. She was educated at Merivale Kindergarten and Rangi Ruru Girls' School. She took classes at Canterbury College, and was part of a group of students that lobbied the New Zealand Institute of Architects after all students failed their Testimonies of Study in 1934.

=== Career ===
In 1931 Munro joined Cecil Wood's office as office assistant, where was regarded as 'just a draughtsperson' by Miles Warren. However when all other staff were laid off during the Great Depression, and costs cut through salary reductions and smaller offices, Munro recalled she and Wood were reduced to making lampshades. Munro was not encouraged to pursue formal architectural training by Wood: "Cecil was a man who thought girls should have a lovely social life and look pretty. He felt I would be wasting the best years of my life if I bothered about exams." She did however attend classes at Canterbury College in architectural drawing, design, ornamentation, geometry, and perspective. Joining the Christchurch Architectural Students' Association, Munro was also a member of their atelier on High Street and won some of their design competitions.

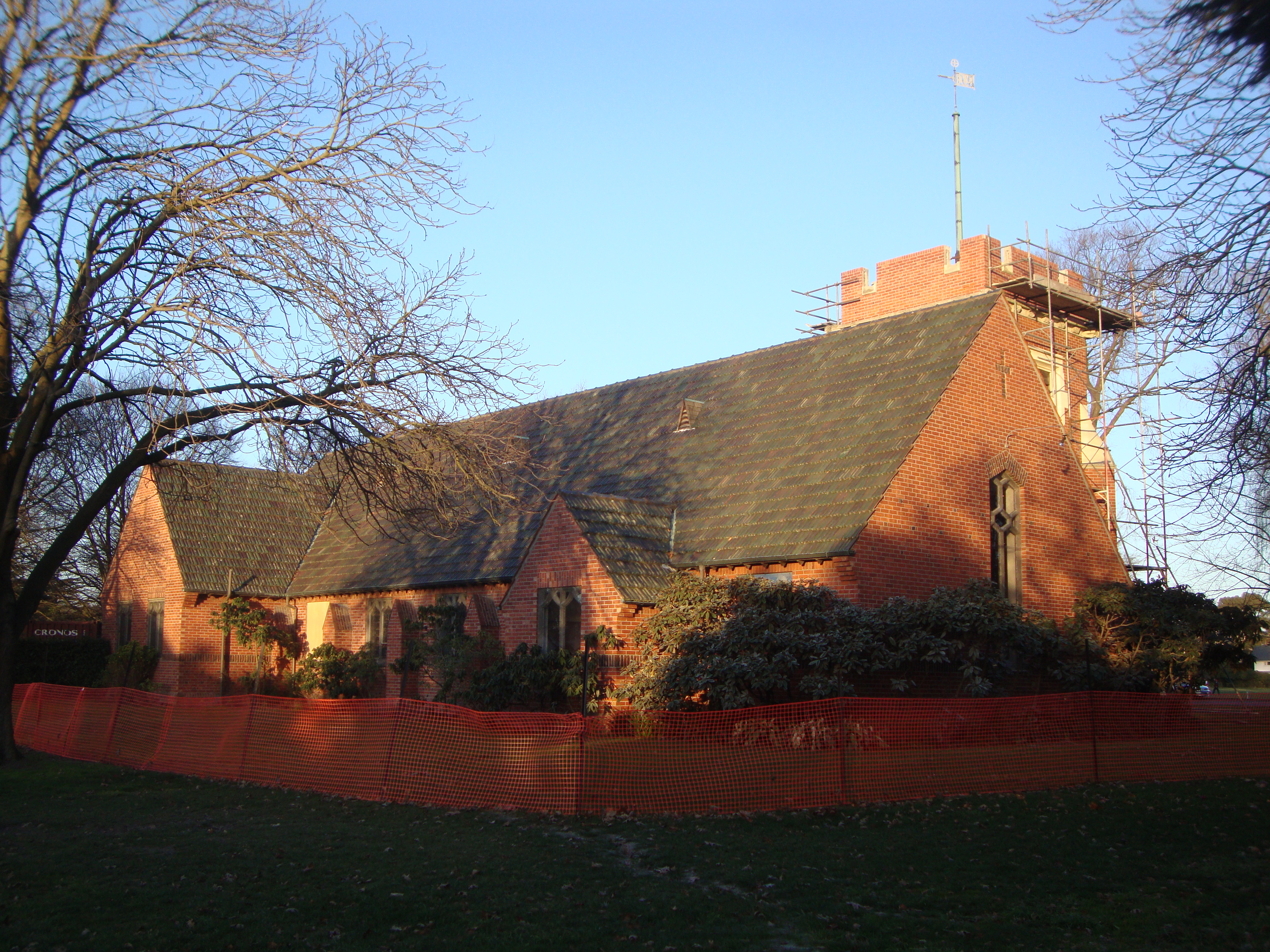
St Andrew's College Memorial Chapel in 2011 before its demolition

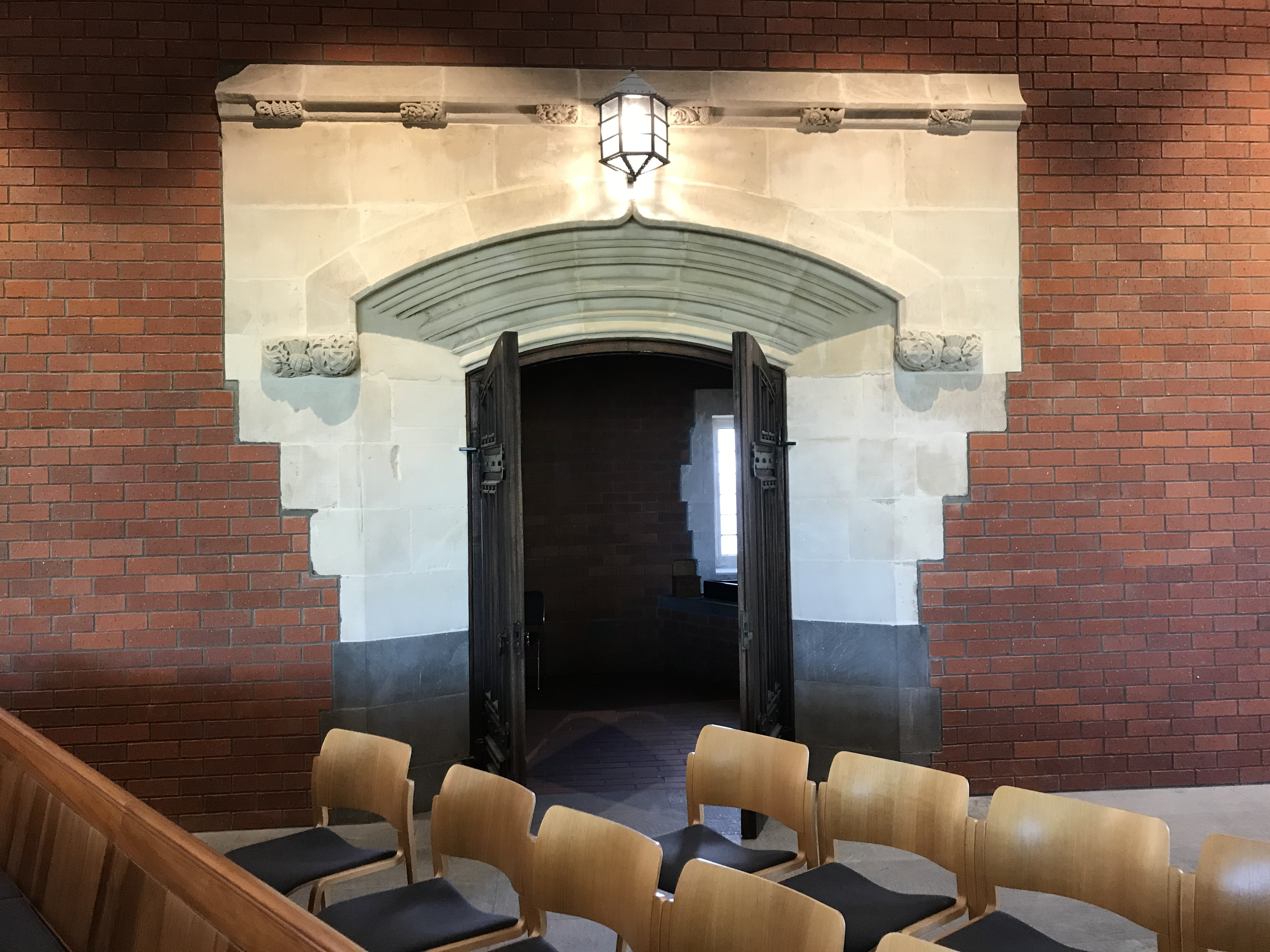
Parts of the old chapel have been incorporated into the new building, like this entrance to the bell tower

Desiring overseas experience, Munro sent some of her drawings to New Zealand architect E. Brian O'Rorke in London, and received a job offer from him in 1939. She travelled to London in 1939, and contributed to the design of the royal railway carriage interiors commissioned by King George VI. Munro's stay lasted only six months, and she returned home to rejoin Wood's office when war was declared. Munro remained in Wood's employ until 1945, when she resigned alongside Robert (Bob) Clarence Munro (1910–1959). The office was struggling with the workload associated with designing the new Anglican cathedral in Wellington, St Paul, but rather than employ another draughtsperson, as requested by his staff, Wood hired an inexperienced school leaver. Bob and Margaret both resigned in frustration. Munro's immediate plan was to try to resume work with O'Rorke in England, but before any offer could be made she was invited to complete architectural drawings for Heathcote Helmore's firm Heathcote and Cotterill. Very shortly afterwards, Bob Munro asked Margaret to join him in practice, although as she was still unregistered they worked under the name R. C. Munro. A year later, in 1946, Margaret sat the NZIA final examinations, but failed the structural steel and reinforced concrete subjects. Bob and Margaret married in 1948, and between 1946 and 1958 completed a number of projects included the Oxford County Council buildings, St Andrew's College chapel and classrooms in Christchurch, nine houses, and commissions from the DIC department store. The practice also took on outstanding work from Cecil Wood's office when he died in 1947, which included Woodened Vicarage, extensions at Christ's and St Andrew's Colleges, and the Wellington Anglican cathedral project. Margaret was likely the principal architect on the St Andrew's College chapel. She also designed the interior and the roll of honour.

After Bob Munro died in 1959, Munro tried again to register with the NZIA. This time she succeeded, although with the proviso that she "always engage a consultant engineer", presumably to make up for her failure in the structural exams. She set up her practice on Peterborough Street in Christchurch, as Mrs M. A. Munro, NZIA "with the Mrs in very small print." Her commissions included Georgian-influenced houses, such as the Druker House on Papanui Road, the Gothic style church St Stephen's in Ashburton, although her preference was for houses, especially L-shaped. Her designs often had her husband's name on the plans, such as at The Maples on Wai-iti Terrace in Christchurch, which is the twin of the heritage-protected Helmores Lane house that was Cecil Wood's home in retirement.

=== Later life ===
Munro retired in 1965 due to ill-health, but she continued to accept commissions. She was an active member of the NZIA and wrote on architecture for The Press. Munro died in 2005.

=== Legacy ===
Architecture and Women New Zealand have named their Munro Diversity Award in their Dulux Awards after Margaret. The award is given to nominees recognised for their work in promoting and practicing diversity in their architectural practices.

Munro Diversity Award Recipients
Year	Finalists	Winner	Source
2023	AKAU, Dorita Hannah, Jessica Halliday (Te Pūtahi), Kathy Waghorn (HOOPLA), Tessa Forde with Groupwork and Pre-fab	Dr. Kathy Waghorn, HOOPLA and Auckland University of Technology	
2020	AKAU, Jasmax, Jade Kake (Matakohe Architecture + Urbanism), Katherine Skipper (Warren and Mahoney), Julie Wilson	Jade Kake, Matakohe Architecture + Urbanism	
2017	Dorita Hannah (University of Tasmania), Jade Hill (Chow: Hill), Jade Kake (Te Matapihi he tirohangi mo te Iwi Trust), Gillian Macleod and Jackie Gillies (MH Gillian and Origin Consultants), Lindley Naismith (Scarlet Architects)	Lindley Naismith, Scarlet Architects	
2014	Amanda Reynolds, Justine Clark and Gill Mathewson (Parlour), Smith and Scully Architects, Studio Pacific, Thursday Lunch Group (including Claire Chambers, Denise Civil, Ellen Brinkman)	Justine Clark and Gill Mathewson, Parlour	
