= Raukura Turei =

New Zealand architect, artist and actor

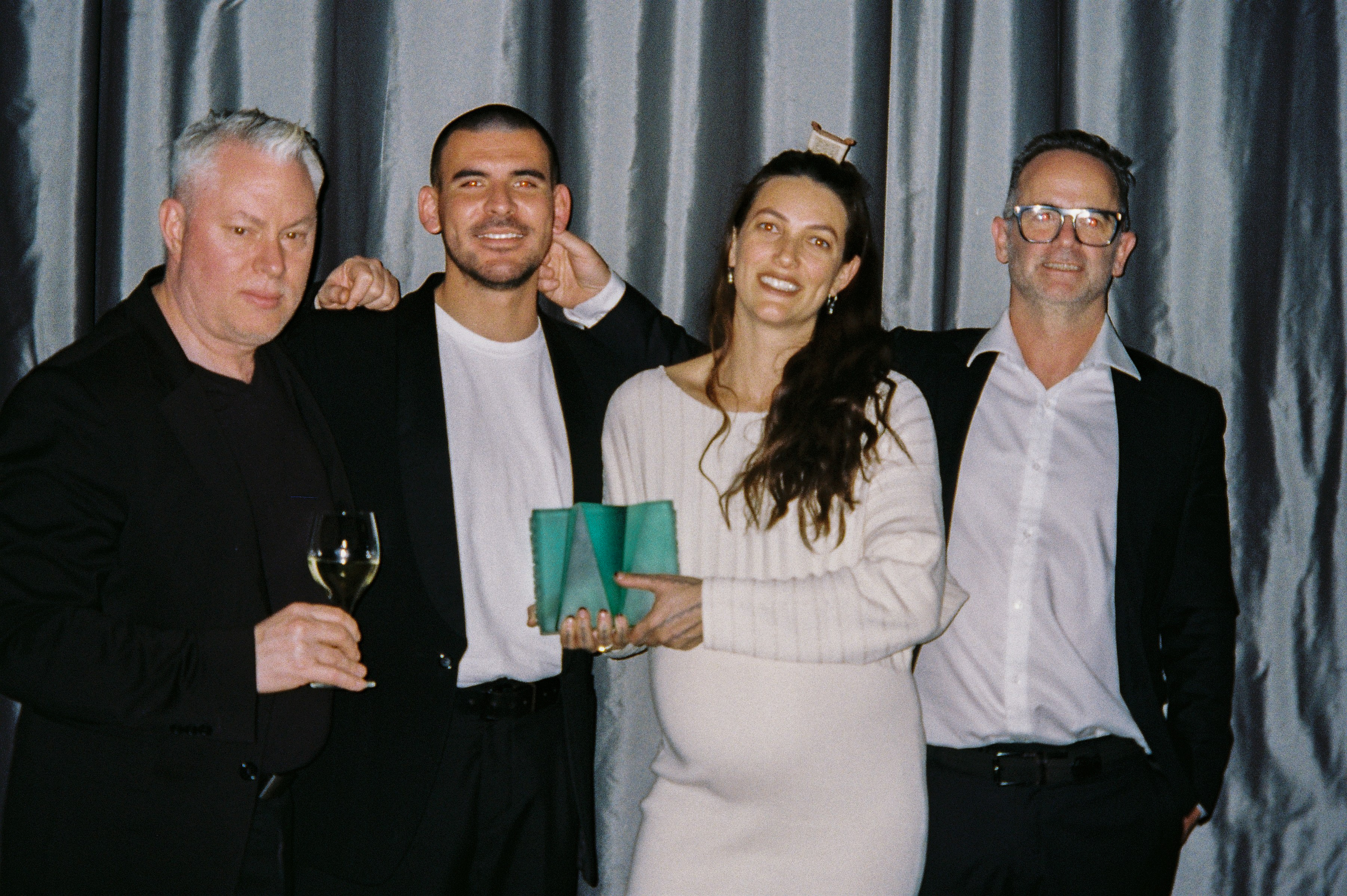
- Raukura in 2023, second from the right
- Born: 1987 (age 38–39); Auckland, New Zealand
- Education: University of Auckland
- Occupations: Designer; actor; artist
- Website: raukuraturei.com

Raukura Maria Turei (born 1987) is a New Zealand artist, actor and architectural designer. She works with Māori iwi to design community-focused developments at the architectural practice Monk Mackenzie Architects. Her paintings have been exhibited throughout New Zealand, and she appeared in the New Zealand film The Dead Lands.

== Early life and education ==
Turei was born in Auckland in 1987. She is Māori and affiliates with the iwi (tribes) of Ngāi Tai ki Tāmaki and Ngā Rauru Kītahi. Her father is Māori and her mother is Pākehā. Her mother supported Turei and her sister to learn the Māori language from a young age, and learnt alongside them.

Turei studied architecture at the University of Auckland, graduating with a Bachelor of Architectural Studies degree in 2009 and a Master of Architecture with first-class honours in 2012. In 2015, she registered as an architect with the New Zealand Registered Architects Board.

In an interview with Dale Husband in 2023, Turei stated that painting was her first love, but she listened to an influential teacher who steered her in the direction of architecture.

== Career ==
=== Art practice ===
Turei has an art practice creating paintings, often utilising natural materials including iron sand and pigments from different landscapes. Turei's painting has been described as a 'journey in reconnecting with her whakapapa'. In New Zealand her work has been exhibited at the Dowse Art Museum (Wellington), Centre of Contemporary Art Toi Moroki (CoCA) (Christchurch), Objectspace (Auckland), Te Pātaka Toi - The Adam Art Gallery (Wellington), Bartley and Co (Wellington) and Sumer Contemporary, Tauranga.

Designers and artists that inspire Turei include Mata Aho Collective, Kauae Raro Research Collective, ĀKAU, Pacific Sisters, My Art Aunties and Anne Lacaton.

Internationally, Turei has had artwork exhibited at the Tokyo Art Fair (2019), the Sydney Contemporary Art Fair and Day01 Gallery (also in Sydney).

In 2018 Turei created on site at the Adam Art Gallery in Wellington an artwork called Te poho o Hine-Ruhi, for the exhibition The earth looks upon us Ko Papatuanuku te matua o te tangata created with 'clay, acrylic, and water on digital print'.

The Pacific Portraits is a series Turei created whilst on residency in Rarotonga.

Turei is a resident artist at Corban Estate Arts Centre in West Auckland.

=== Architecture ===
Turei has worked for Stevens Lawson Architects and Cheshire Architects in her architectural career.

Turei worked on the redevelopment of Q Theatre early on in her architectural practice. Her tole was with Te Rōpū Reo Whakahaere, a Māori consultant group, working alongside architect Pip Cheshire. Turei observed there was "a level of engagement in te ao Māori that enriched the way the building is used".

As of 2023, Turei was working as a principal at Monk Mackenzie Architects in Auckland. Her work at Monk Mackenzie Architects involves leading papakāinga (Māori housing), marae planning (Māori communal places) and community-focused developments with iwi (Māori nation groups). A building that she says is influential to her architectural practice is the Teshima Art Museum by Ryue Nishizawa in Japan, and an architect she admires is Lina Bo Bardi.

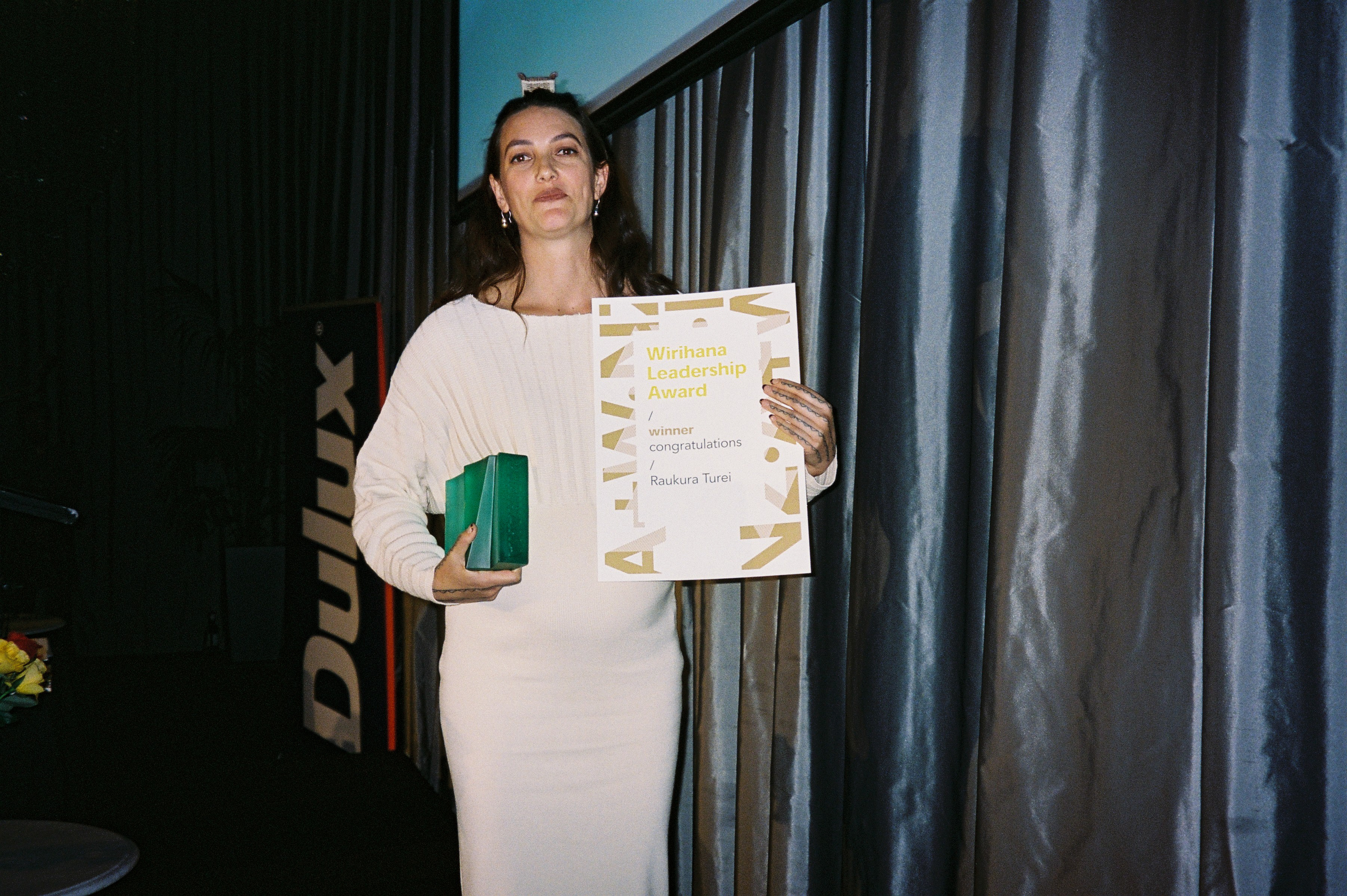
Raukura with the 2023 Wirihana Award Trophy

Turei is a member of the Architecture + Women New Zealand network. She was on the jury panel in 2020 for the Architecture + Women NZ Dulux Awards alongside Lori Brown, Julia Gatley and Andrew Tu’inukuafe.

In 2020, Turei won the residential category at the Interior Awards, a New Zealand-based architecture award. In 2021, Turei was a judge for the awards, and in 2022 won the Emerging Design Professional Award. The jury said: "Her cohesive, holistic projects demonstrate a pursuit of excellence at the highest level, within both te ao Māori and the built environment".

In 2023, Turei was awarded the Wirihana Leadership Award at the A+W NZ 2023 Dulux Awards.

=== Acting ===
The Dead Lands, a New Zealand action film directed by Toa Fraser, and Find Me a Māori Bride are two screen works Turei has appeared in. Turei was a finalist in the 2014 Rialto Channel New Zealand Film Awards for her role in The Dead Lands.

== Awards ==
- Manukau Urban Maori Authority Best Supporting Actress (2014), finalist for her role in The Dead Lands - Rialto Channel New Zealand Film Awards
- Student & Academic Spatial (2012), student Raukura Turei, tutor Lynda Simmons - Best Awards, The Designers Institute of New Zealand
- Residential category - Ōwairaka House project (2020) New Zealand Interior Awards
- Emerging Design Professional Award (2022) - New Zealand Interior Awards
- Wirihana Leadership Award (2023).

== Selected exhibitions ==
- He Whare Tangata (2013) - with Elisapeta Heta & Lynda Simmons, Between Silos A+W Exhibition, Auckland
- Whare in the Bush (2014) (with four others), Warkworth
- The Grief Series (2017), Miss Crabb HQ, Auckland
- Untitled (pending welcome) (2017), Objectspace, Auckland
- SELF (2017), Allpress Studio, Auckland
- Mark Work (2021) - group exhibition, featuring a multi-paneled artwork called Te Poho o Hine-Moana (2021), Centre of Contemporary Art Toi Moroki (CoCA) (Christchurch) and Objectspace (Auckland) (touring exhibition)
- Takoto ai te marino (16 September 2023 – 10 March 2024) (solo exhibition), The Dowse Art Museum, Wellington
- Artist residency, Rarotonga (date unspecified)
