= Insley =

Insley is a surname. Notable people with the name include:

- Deborah Ann Insley Dingell (born 1953; maiden surname Insley), Democratic Party politician
- Earl Insley (1911–1958), American football coach and player
- Jill Insley, British financial journalist
- John Insley Blair (1802–1899; maternal surname Insley), American entrepreneur, railroad magnate, philanthropist
- Lawson Insley, 19th-century daguerreotyptist in Australia and New Zealand
- Tere Insley, New Zealand Māori architect
- Trevor Insley (born 1977), American football wide receiver
- Will Insley (1929–2011), American painter, architect, planner of utopian urban models

== See also ==
- John Insley Blair Larned (1883–1955), suffragan bishop of the Episcopal Diocese of Long Island; named after his great-grandfather John Insley Blair (1802–1899)
- Insley Manufacturing Co. produced heavy construction equipment, based in Indianapolis, Indiana
- Fort Insley, constructed to help protect the town and post of Fort Scott, Kansas, from Confederate forces
- Insley-Astley syndrome or Otospondylomegaepiphyseal dysplasia, an autosomal recessive disorder of bone growth
- Inslee (surname)
