= Lori Brown =

Lori Brown may refer to:

- Lori Lipman Brown (born 1958), American politician and activist
- Lori Brown (architect) (born 1969), American architect
