= Felicity Wallace =

New Zealand architect

- Born: New Zealand
- Occupation: Architect

Felicity Wallace is a New Zealand architect who has been in practice since 1989. New Zealand's Home magazine recognised one of her designs as "Home of the Year" in 1997. She teaches design at university level and she continues to lead and design.

== Biography ==
Wallace set up her practice in 1989. She was the first woman in New Zealand to be registered as an architect in the 1990s. She was amongst a handful of other women architects including Fiona Christeller, Julie Stout and Deborah Cranko who were able to get work on commercial projects. For Wallace this included the redevelopment in central Auckland of the Plaza Block between Queen St, High Street and Vulcan Lane. Other commercial projects include the cricket pavilion at Melville Park, Auckland, and the first purpose-built hospice in Auckland. In 1991 and then again in 1993 Wallace designed the Watershed Theatre on Auckland's waterfront. This was in partnership with Dorita Hannah and their firm Hannah Wallace Architects. The first theatre was demolished to make way for the Maritime Museum.

In 1997 Wallace won the Home of the Year, for the Livingstone Street Townhouses, with the New Zealand vernacular materials of concrete block, rough-sawn timber and corrugated iron in a finely crafted manner. The building was noted for its bold and geometric triangular form. This was a collaboration with the project architect Stephen Rendell, the client Brian Michie and the builder Neil Herrington.

Wallace has taught design to tertiary students at Auckland University, Unitec Auckland, and Victoria University of Wellington.

Wallace is a member of Architecture + Women NZ. Records of Wallace's architectural practice are held in The University of Auckland Architecture Archive. Wallace has an established architectural practice without the need to publish for promotion of work. In 2023 Wallace was on the board of the New Zealand Institute of Architects.

== Awards ==
- 1997 Home of the Year, Livingstone Street Townhouses, Westmere, Auckland
- 2016 Western Architecture Awards Winner, New Zealand Institute of Architects Awards – Bell-Booth House
- 2020 Waikato / Bay of Plenty Architecture Awards Winner, New Zealand Institute of Architects Awards – Hill House at Hahei
- 2021 Western Architecture Awards Winner, New Zealand Institute of Architects Awards – Small Town House. Manawatū
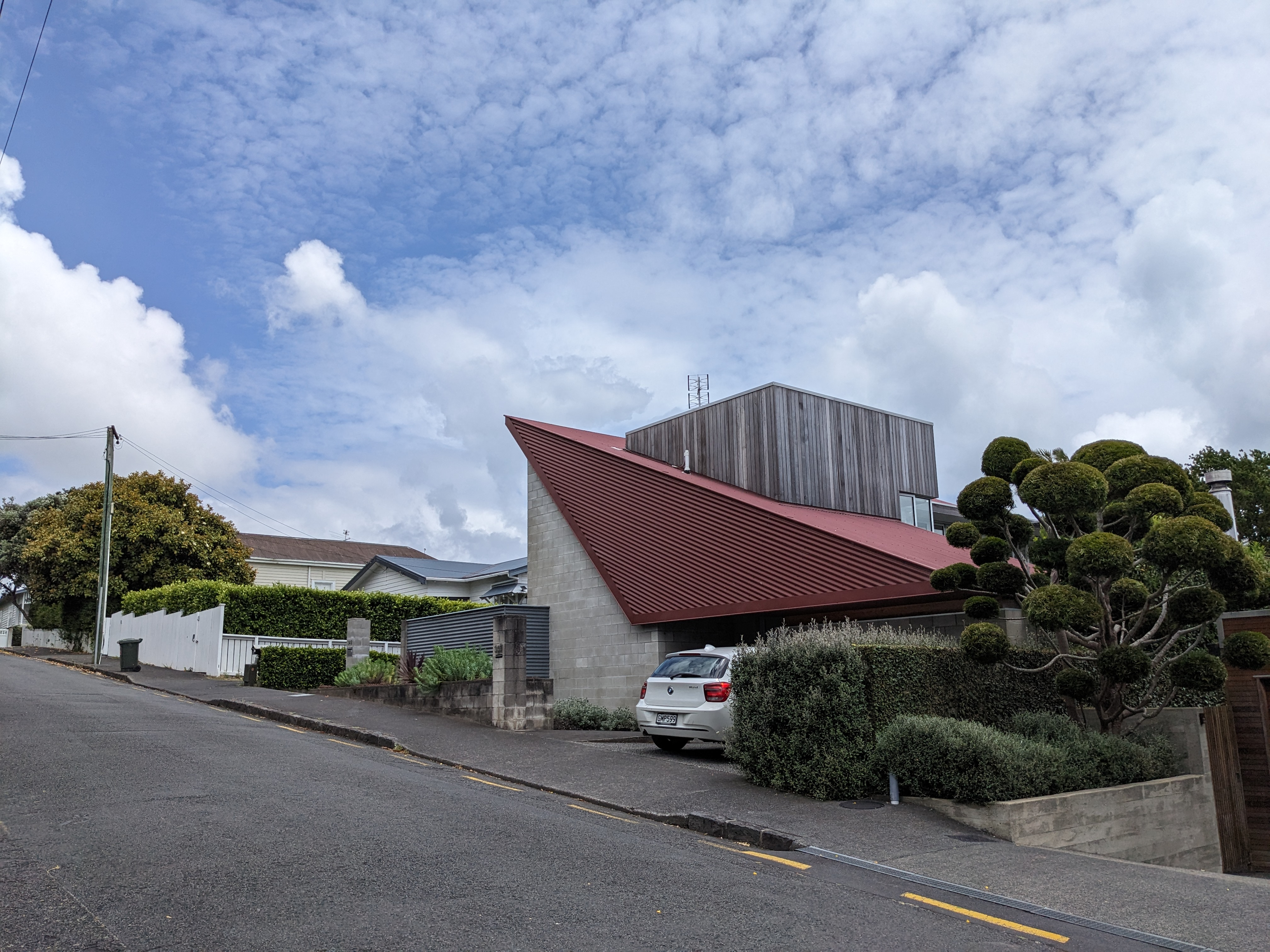
  Livingstone St Townhouses in 2023
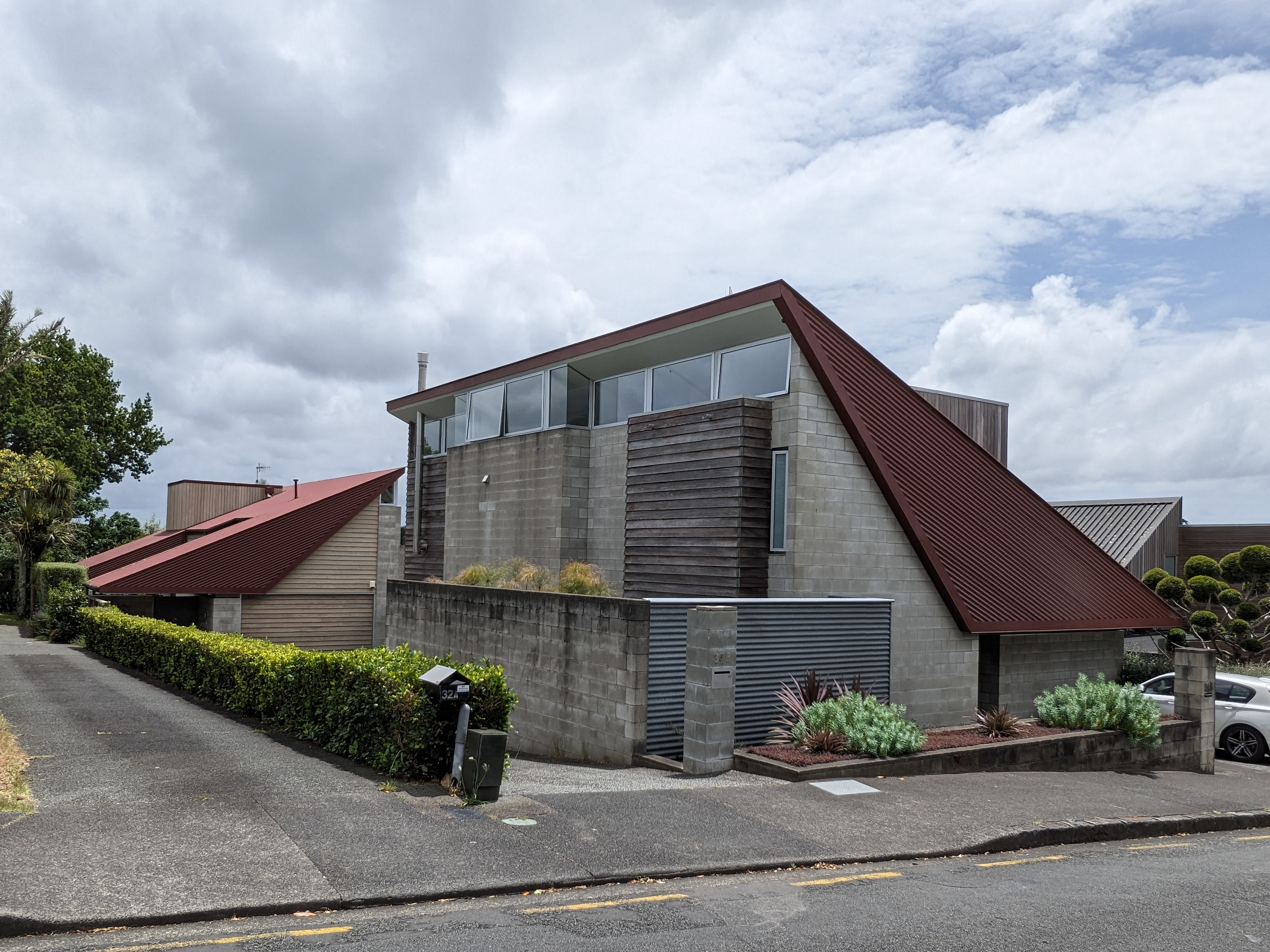
  Livingstone St Townhouses in 2023

== Personal ==
Wallace is based in Marton, New Zealand.

Of having children and the impact on her career Wallace says:

My life is much broader and richer for having spent time investing in my family; buildings are about people. (Felicity Wallace)
