= Edwin Hamilton =

New Zealand politician (1885–1964)

The Honourable Edwin Hamilton

Member of the New Zealand Legislative Council
- In office 22 June 1950 – 31 December 1950

Personal details
- Born: Edwin Henry Staples Hamilton; 29 November 1885 Leeston, New Zealand
- Died: 26 October 1964 (aged 78) Christchurch, New Zealand
- Spouse: Sybil Jameson (m. 1913)
- Children: 5
- Occupation: Accountant and sharebroker

Edwin Henry Staples Hamilton (29 November 1885 – 26 October 1964) of Christchurch was a member of the New Zealand Legislative Council in 1950 as part of the "suicide squad". He was an accountant and sharebroker.

== Biography ==
Hamilton was born on 29 November 1885 in Leeston, New Zealand. His father was Staples Hamilton, a canon. He received his education in Hokitika, Geraldine, and at Christ's College in Christchurch. He married Sybil Jameson (1892–1981) in 1913; she was a granddaughter of James Jameson.

Hamilton trained as an accountant and became an Associate Public Accountant (APANZ). He was employed by the Bank of New South Wales from 1905 to 1916, stationed in Geraldine, Christchurch, Perth, and Wellington. He worked at the Christchurch Stock Exchange as a share broker from 1920. He became a fellow of Christ's College in 1922. He was president of the local Rotary Club in 1929 and 1930. Hamilton was elected onto the Christchurch Drainage Board from 1924 to 1936, and again from 1937. He was chairman of the Drainage Board in 1938 and 1949. He was involved with Walter Hume in the initial stages of the development of the Cobb Power Station.

Hamilton was appointed as a member of the so-called "suicide squad" nominated by the First National Government in 1950 to vote for the abolition of the Council. Most of the new members (like Hamilton) were appointed on 22 June 1950, and served until 31 December 1950 when the Council was abolished.

In 1953, Hamilton was awarded the Queen Elizabeth II Coronation Medal.

Hamilton died on 26 October 1964 in Christchurch. He was cremated at the Harewood crematorium. He was survived by his wife and their five children, the eldest of whom was Margaret Munro.
