= Architecture + Women NZ Dulux Awards =

New Zealand architecture awards

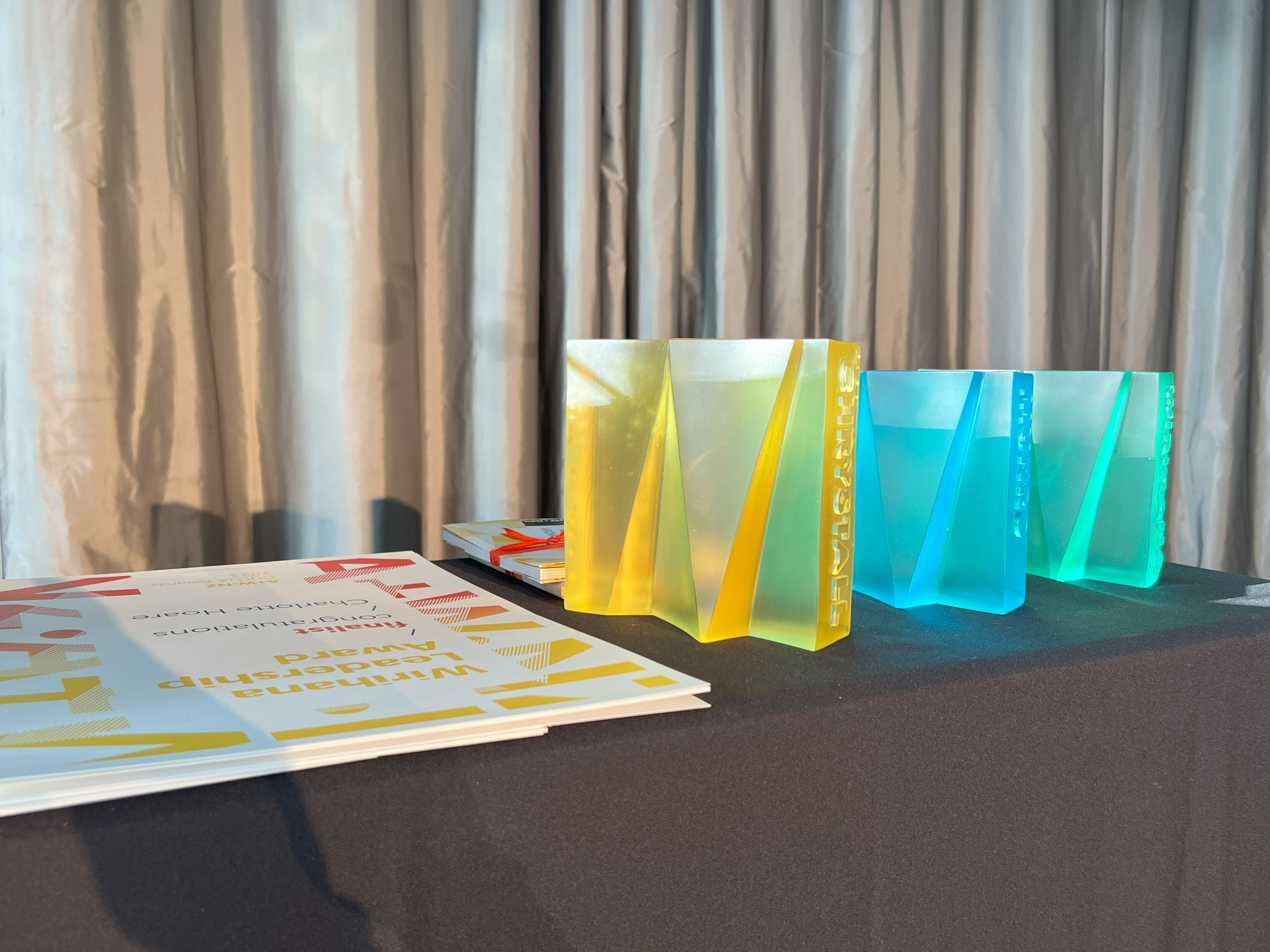
- Awarded for: the contribution of women to architecture
- Sponsored by: Dulux
- Country: New Zealand
- First award: 2014

The Architecture + Women NZ Dulux Awards is a tri-annual set of awards which recognise the contribution of women to the field of architecture in New Zealand. The awards recognise full bodies of work and community connections.

The awards were first made in 2014. In 2020 the awards event was held online due to the COVID-19 pandemic. Nominations are invited from the public, and a panel selects finalists in each category. The finalists are invited to an awards dinner where the recipients are announced. The award trophy is designed and made by Ainsley O'Connell.

== Categories ==
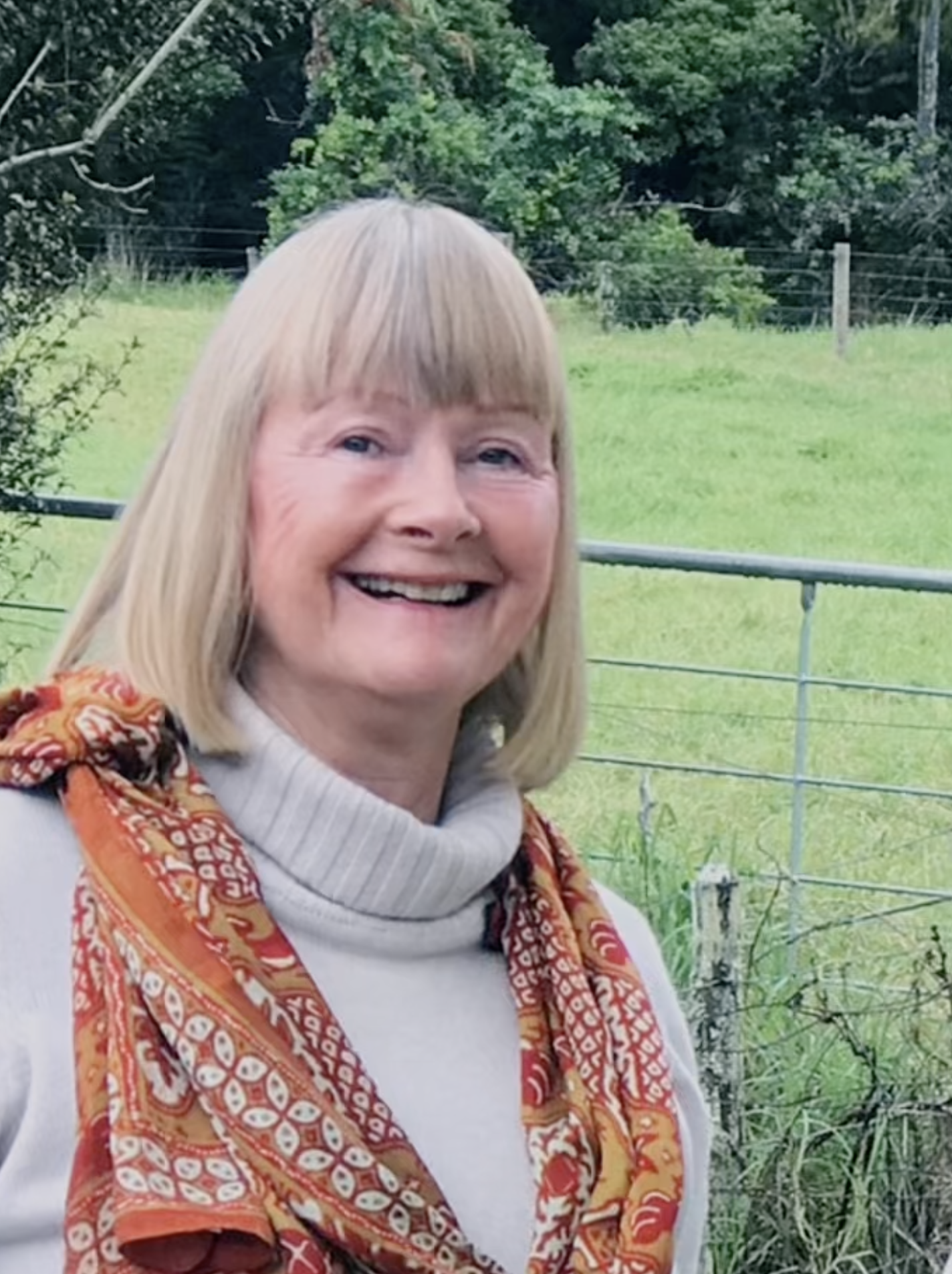
Lindley Naismith, winner of the 2017 Munro Diversity Award

The awards are presented in three categories.

=== Tere Hunuku te Kawakawa Leadership Award ===
The award is open to all Architecture + Women NZ members who are in their second decade after graduation.

From 2014-2026, the award was called the Wirihana Leadership award, named after Moana Wirihana (Te Kawerau ā Maki) whose leadership saw the design and construction of many wharenui (meeting houses) in New Zealand. It was announced in 2026 that the award would be renamed Tere Hunuku te Kawakawa Leadership Award in honour of Tere Insley, the first Māori woman registered architect.

=== Munro Diversity Award ===
This award is "open to all genders, and looks specifically for evidence of continued support strategies for diversity in the workplace, including but not necessarily restricted to gender". The award is named because of the structural problems in early New Zealand architecture where affluence was a requirement for education, and bias meant women often were not named architect even though this is what they were doing. It is named after Christchurch architect Margaret Munro.

=== Chrystall Excellence Award ===
This award is open to women with three or more decades of architecture practice. It is named for Lillian Chrystall who in 1967 was the first woman to win a New Zealand Institute of Architects national award.

== Judges ==
The jury for the 2026 awards was Lindley Naismith, Charmaine 'Ilaiū Talei, Ica Tiseli, Huai Reriti, and Tere Insley. The jury for the 2023 awards had four members: Justine Clark, Craig Moller, Sarah Treadwell and Carinnya Feaunati. The jury for the 2020 awards was Lori Brown, Julia Gatley, Raukura Turei and Andrew Tu’inukuafe. The jury for the 2017 awards was Brit Andresen, Sharon Jansen, Anna Tong and Dave Strachan.

== Recipients ==
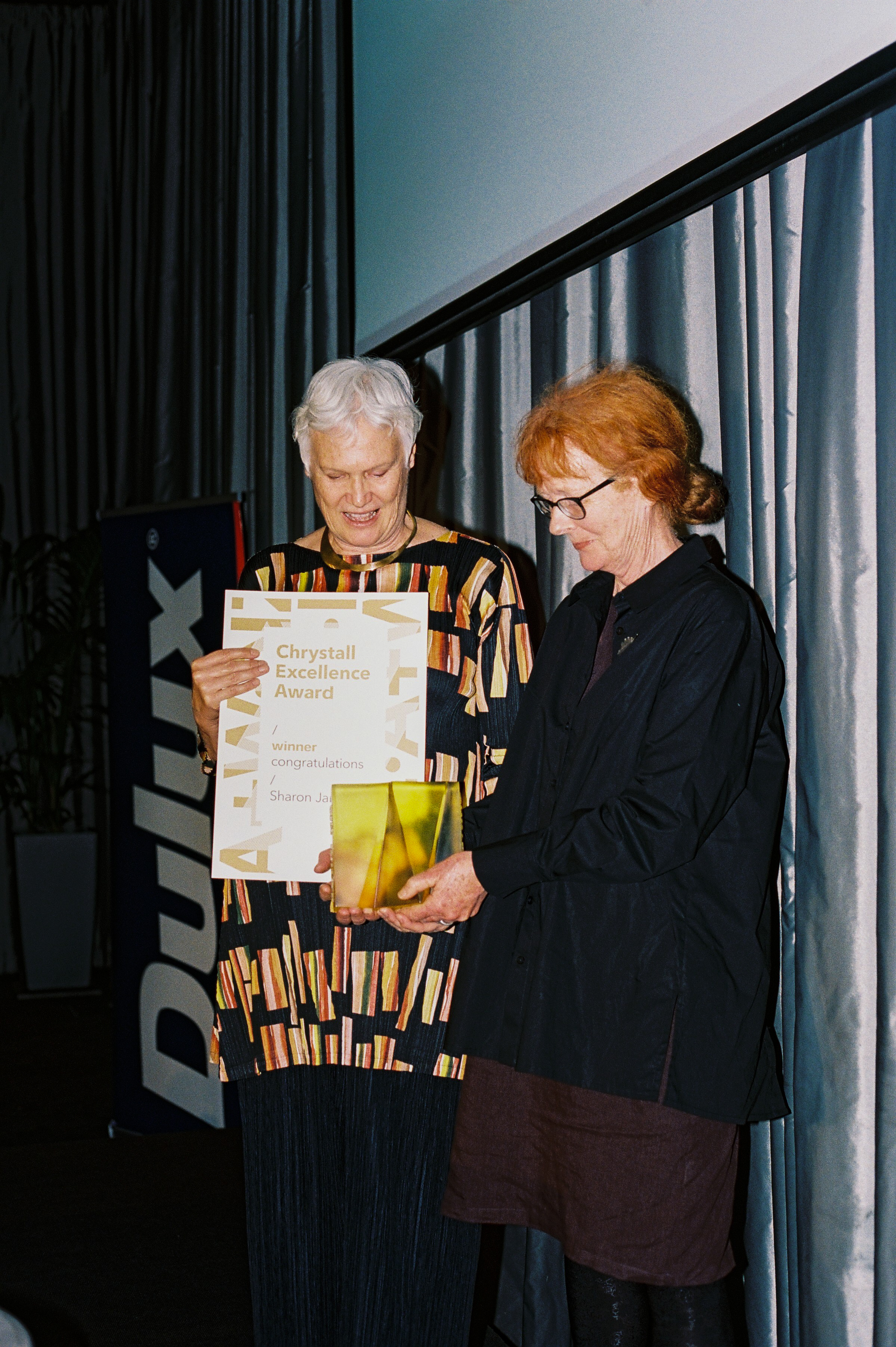
Sharon Jansen being awarded the Chrystall Excellence award by Sarah Treadwell, 2023.

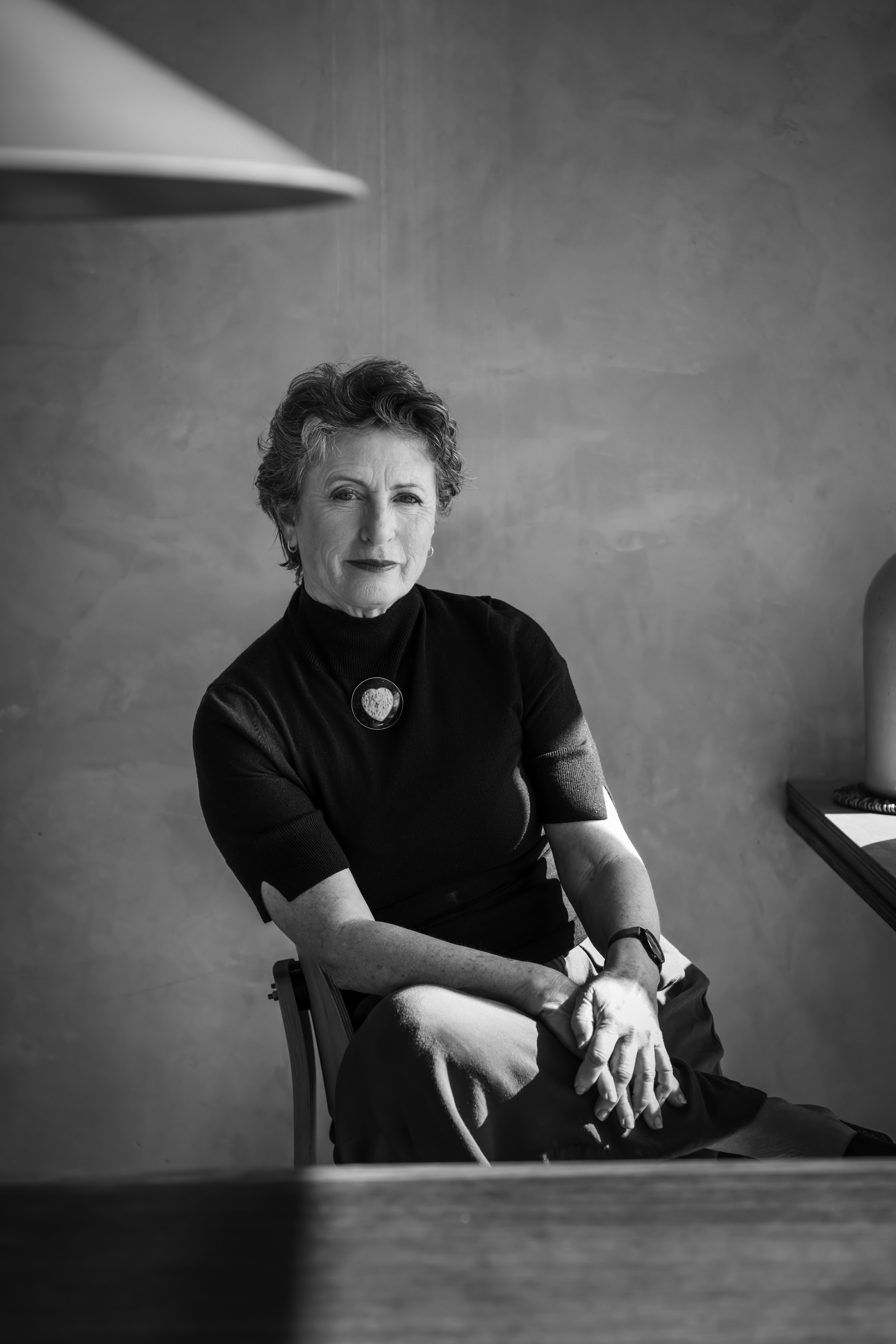
Julie Stout, winner of the 2014 Chrystall Excellence Award

Year	Award	Recipient	Notes
2023	Wirihana Leadership Award	Raukura Turei, Monk Mackenzie	
2023	Munro Diversity Award	Kathy Waghorn, HOOPLA	
2023	Chrystall Excellence Award	Sharon Jansen	

Year	Award	Recipient	Notes
2020	Wirihana Leadership Award	Louise Wright, Assembly Architects	
2020	Munro Diversity Award	Jade Kake, Matakohe Architecture and Urbanism Ltd	
2020	Chrystall Excellence Award	Christina van Bohemen, Sills van Bohemen	

Year	Award	Recipient	Notes
2017	Wirihana Leadership Award	Bureaux Ltd (Jessica Barter and Maggie Carroll)	
2017	Munro Diversity Award	Lindley Naismith, Scarlet Architects	
2017	Chrystall Excellence Award	Sarah Treadwell	

Year	Award	Recipient	Notes
2014	Wirihana Leadership Award	Cecile Bonnifait, Bonnifait + Giesen Atelier Workshop	
2014	Munro Diversity Award	Justine Clark & Gill Matthewson, Parlour	
2014	Chrystall Excellence Award	Julie Stout, Mitchell & Stout Architects	

== See also ==
- List of awards honoring women
