= Dorita Hannah =

New Zealand architect, academic, visual artist and designer

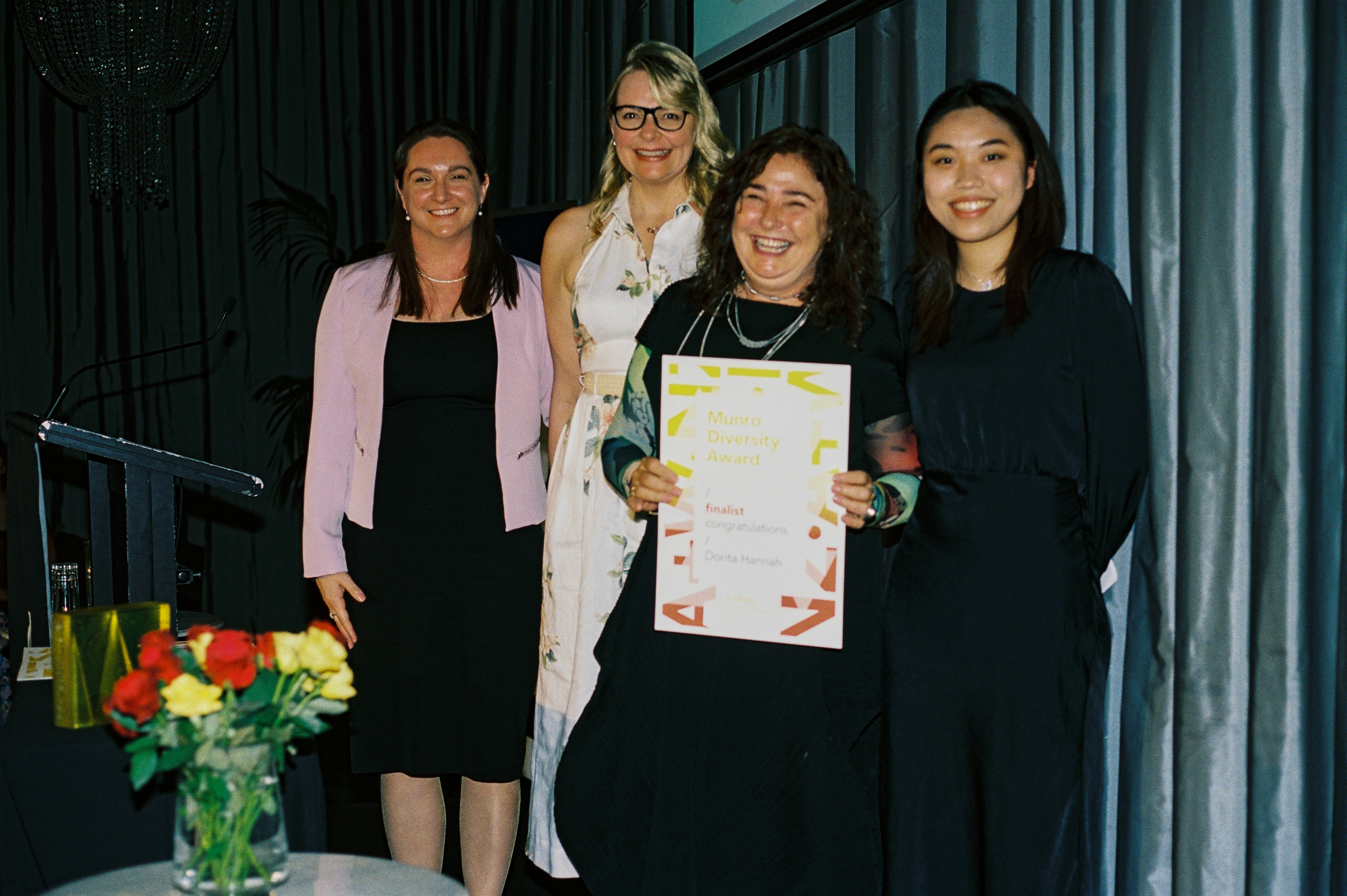
- Hannah at the A+W NZ 2023 Dulux Awards
- Education: University of Auckland; New York University
- Occupations: Architect; Adjunct professor Visual artist
- Awards: Costume Designer of the Year 1994, Set Designer of the Year 1996
- Projects: PhoneHome 2018, Fluid States 2015, Flood 2015, Now/Next: Performance Space at the Crossroads 2011

Dorita Hannah is a New Zealand architect, independent academic, visual artist and designer. She has had an architectural practice, taught at various institutions in New Zealand and internationally, and has published articles and book chapters including Event-Space: Theatre Architecture and the Historical Avant-Garde (2018).

== Education ==
Hannah trained in architecture, receiving her BArch (hons) at the University of Auckland in 1984. She received two postgraduate degrees at New York University: a Master of Arts with Distinction in Performance Studies in 2000, and a PhD with Distinction from the Tisch School of the Arts in 2008.

== Professional life ==
Hannah had an architectural practice with Felicity Wallace called Hannah Wallace Architects. They designed the Watershed Theatre (1991-1996) on Auckland's waterfront. This happened twice: the first completed in 1991 was demolished, and was located where the New Zealand Maritime Museum currently is; the second was completed in 1993.

Since 1986, Hannah has taught architecture, design and visual arts, undertaking academic research at Victoria University of Wellington and Massey University in New Zealand, and has held a positions at international universities in Australia, Serbia, the Netherlands, China, USA, and Finland. She is a "self-professed nomadic professor" whose work embraces diversity and the marginalised.

Hannah's practice and research focus on performance space and spatial performativity, spanning the spatial, visual, performing and culinary arts. She specialises in theatre architecture and performance space, and her designs "incorporate scenography, interior, exhibition and installation design".

== Selected artistic works ==
- Architect for the Watershed Theatre, Auckland, 1991 and again in 1993.
- Set designer for Hone Kouka's play Nga tangata toa – the warrior people, at Auckland's Watershed Theatre in 1995.
- Exhibition curator and designer of Now/Next Performance Space at the Crossroads in 2011.
- Co-curator and director of design for Fluid States at Performance Studies International PSi #21 in 2015.
- Architecture and performance designer for Flood in 2015.
- Design director and co-curator, PhoneHome exhibition, Architecture and Urbanism Biennial in Valparaíso, Chile in 2017.
- Scenographer for Emily Perkin's play The Made, at Auckland Theatre Company in 2022.

== Selected academic works ==
Hannah is author of the 2018 book, Event-Space: Theatre Architecture and the Historical Avant-Garde, described by scholar Jan Smitheram as "exceptionally engaging, and [offering] thoughtful speculations about the negotiation of theatre and architecture." Her book is based on her PhD in Performance Studies of the same name.

- Dorita Hannah (2 October 2019). "NOW/NEXT: Performance Space at the Crossroads". Theatre and Performance Design. 5 (3–4): 212–232. doi:10.1080/23322551.2019.1696073. ISSN 2332-2551. Wikidata Q118501920.
- Dorita Hannah (2018), Event-Space: Theatre Architecture and the Historical Avant-Garde, OL 21247664W, Wikidata Q118501971
- Dorita Hannah (2014). "Alarming the heart: Costume as performative body-object-event". Scene. 2 (1–2): 15–34. ISSN 2044-3714. Wikidata Q118503027.

== Awards ==
Hannah won Theatre Aotearoa's Chapman Tripp Theatre Award for Costume Designer of the Year in 1994 (for the play Nga tangata toa – the warrior people) and Set Designer of the Year in 1996 (for the play, The Visit). She was also nominated for the same awards in 1995 for costume design and set design, and in 1996 for costume design.

Hannah was the Theatre Design Consultant for the Blyth Performing Arts Centre, designed by Stevens Lawson Architects, which received the New Zealand Architecture Medal in 2015.

In 2023 and 2017, Hannah was a finalist for the A+W•NZ Dulux Awards, based on a career devoted to supporting and promoting diversity in architecture. Several of her works have been chosen to be exhibited at the Prague Quadrennial (PQ), and she has also participated at PQ as core creative team member, international juror and international commissioner.
