= Jessica Halliday =

New Zealand architectural historian

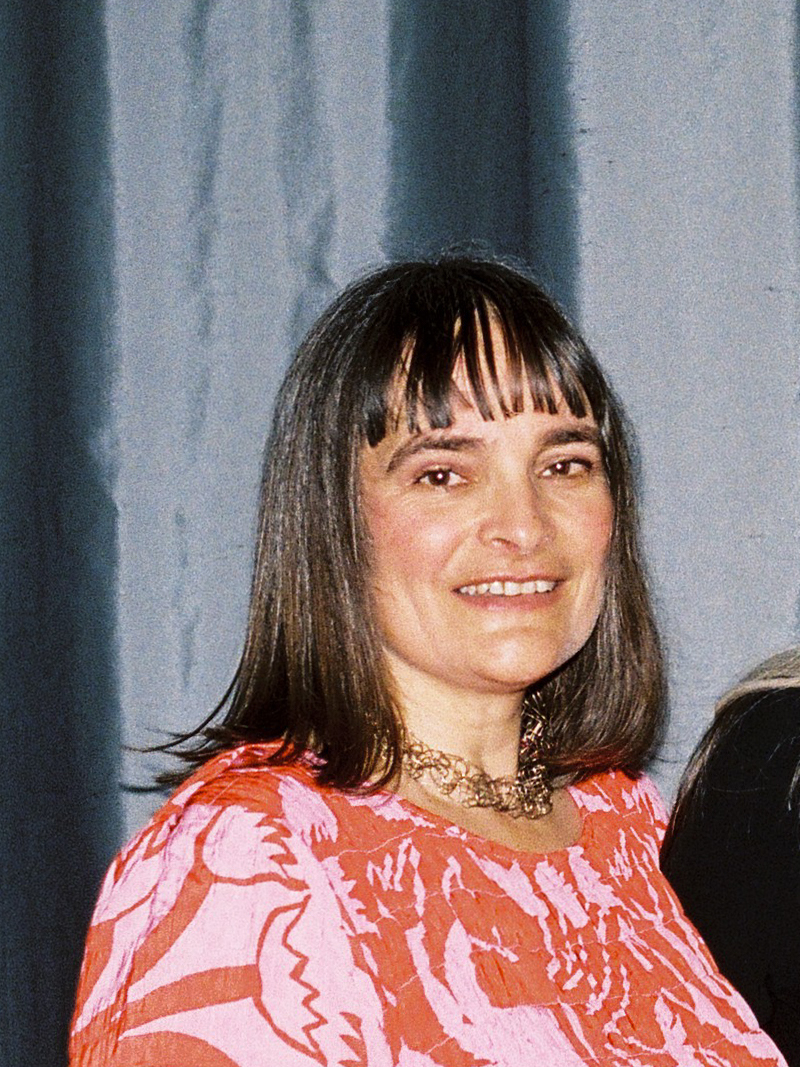
- Alma mater: University of Canterbury
- Occupation: Architectural historian
- Employer: Te Pūtahi Centre for Architecture and City Making

Jessica Halliday is a New Zealand architectural historian and the director of Te Pūtahi Centre for Architecture and City Making in Christchurch. Halliday has initiated many programmes for the public to engage with architecture including Open Christchurch.

== Biography ==
Halliday has a PhD in Art History at the University of Canterbury completed in 2005; her thesis is about the design and construction of the Beehive which is the Executive Wing of the New Zealand Parliament. After completing her PhD in 2005 Halliday worked in London at the Architectural Association from 2006 to 2007.

Halliday was the director of the Festival of Transitional Architecture (FESTA) that was first presented in October 2012 and ended in 2018. Christchurch suffered from an earthquake in 2011 with widespread damage and loss of life. FESTA was attended by thousands of people seeing temporary works of architecture. The 2016 programme included three artists Juliet Arnott (Rekindle), Julia Morison and Julia Harvie with responses to architecture.

Another job Halliday has had is for two years running the Ilam School of Fine Arts gallery.

Halliday is the director and co-founder of Te Pūtahi Centre for Architecture and City Making in Christchurch, this followed on from FESTA. They run events to inform and engage people in 'city making'. Te Pūtahi have run Open Christchurch, an annual festival of architecture events founded in 2019 with open days of significant building and sites, in 2023 it had fifty-two buildings opened to tours and included a celebration of the work of Sir Miles Warren and Maurice Mahoney. In 2021 it had 46 buildings including the St Andrew's College Centennial Chapel designed by Architectus with project architect Jane Rooney, and Tūranga Central Library designed by Architectus and Schmidt Hammer Lassen with Ngāi Tūāhuriri & Matapopore. They also run participatory design workshops and talks, for example a talk in 2022 was called The water city under climate stress about designing for water in Christchurch with climate change with a panelist including Matthew Bradbury from Te Puukenga Unitec, Hannah Lewthwaite, CCC Climate Resilience & Landscape Architect and Ben Brown (Ngāti Mahuta, Ngāti Koroki, Ngāti Paoa) author and performer.

...the design of our cities has a huge part to play in the future of the planet, climate breakdown and the possibility of regeneration. (Halliday 2019)

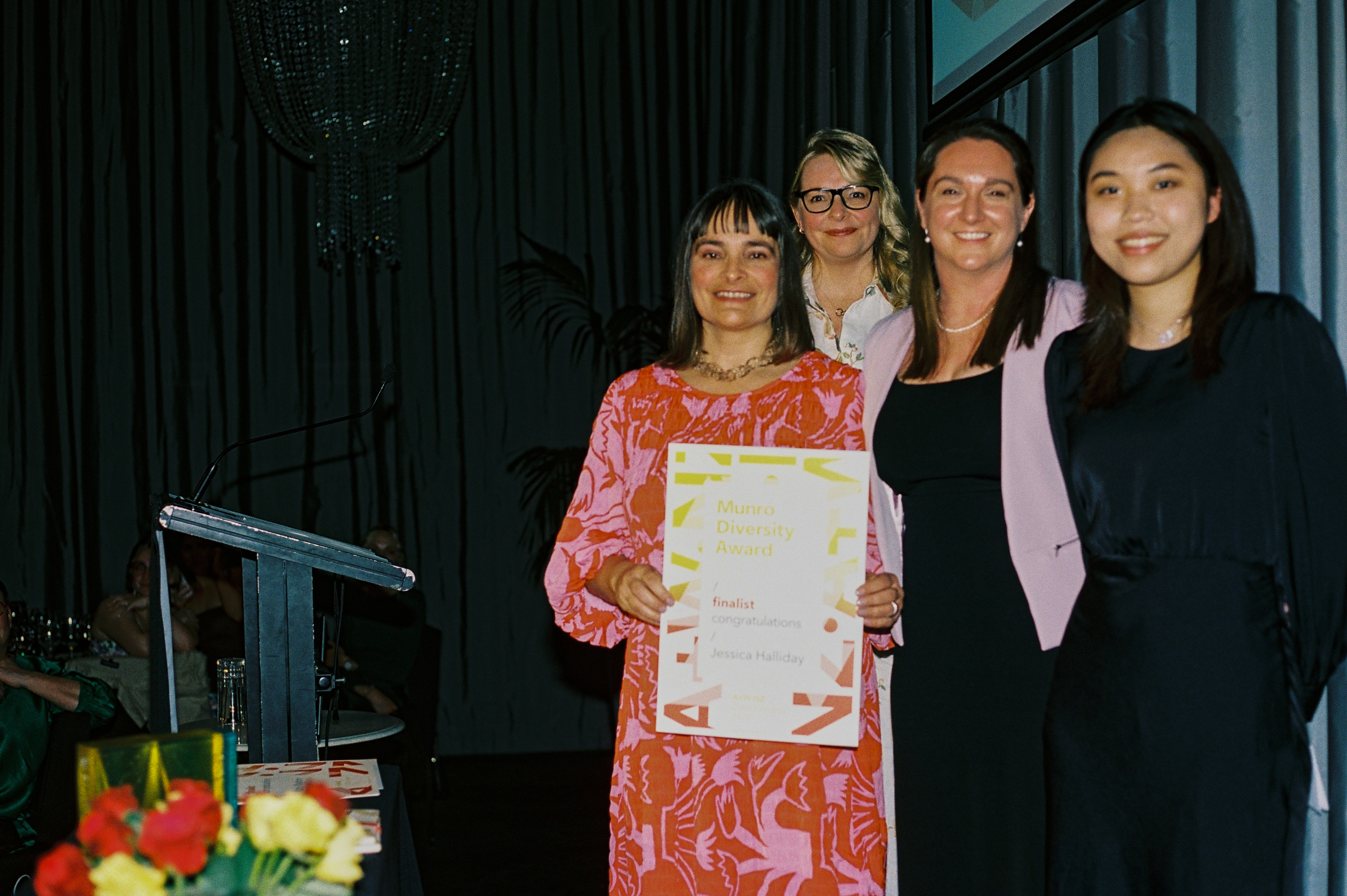
Halliday (left) at the 2023 A+W NZ Dulux Awards

Halliday was a finalist for the Munro Diversity Award in the Architecture + Women NZ Dulux Awards 2023.

In 2025, Halliday was awarded the NZIA President's Award.

Halliday spoke on the Christchurch Regeneration Panel at Te Kōkiringa Taumata New Zealand Planning Institute Conference in April 2023.

Halliday is on the national committee for the New Zealand chapter of the organisation Organisation for the Documentation and Conservation of the Modern Movement in Architecture (DOCOMOMO).

Halliday writes for Architecture Now, an online New Zealand architecture and design publication.

Halliday features in the documentary Maurice and I, contributing a number of interviews about the practice and works of Warren and Mahoney.

== Publications ==
- Long Live the Modern, New Zealand's New Architecture 1904–1984, editor Julia Gatley (2008) ISBN 978-1-86940-415-4 – contributing author
- Shifting Foundations: Post-quake Architecture of Ōtautahi Christchurch (2023) ISBN 978-0-473-65966-0 – contributing author
