= Louise Wright (architect) =

New Zealand architect

- Born: New Zealand
- Education: Victoria University of Wellington
- Occupation: Architect
- Spouse: Justin Wright
- Practice: Assembly Architects
- Buildings: The Sawtooth House
- Website: assembly.co.nz

Louise Wright (née Ryan) is a New Zealand architect. She is co-founder of Assembly Architects and in 2020, she won the Wirihana Leadership Award, Architecture + Women NZ Dulux Awards.

== Biography ==
Wright grew up in Upper Hutt, near Wellington. She is Māori of Te Arawa, Ngāti Tūwharetoa, Te Aitanga-a-Māhaki, Te Aitanga-a-Hauiti and Rongowhakaata descent. She was the head girl at Heretaunga College and went on to study architecture at Victoria University of Wellington, where she won a scholarship to study for a semester in Rome, Italy. After graduating, she worked for Ian Athfield's firm, Athfield Architects, for five years.

In 2005 she co-founded Assembly Architects, which focused on residential work and projects for Wellington Zoo. In 2012 the practice moved to Arrowtown, in the South Island of New Zealand, and began to specialise in high-end homes. Thermal performance in construction has become a focus of Wright's work, and rammed earth construction is a feature of many of her designs.

In 2017 Wright was the convener of the awards jury for the New Zealand Architecture Awards. In 2014 she was appointed to the New Zealand Registered Architects Board. Wright is active in the Southern Lakes district, as a member of the Jack's Point Design Review Board and the Arrowtown Planning Advisory Group. She is currently the chair of Public Protection.

=== Awards and recognition ===
In 2013, a pavilion at Wellington Zoo, co-designed by Wright and two colleagues, won a New Zealand Architecture Award for Small Project Architecture. In 2017 The Sawtooth House, co-designed by Wright, won a housing award at the New Zealand Institute of Architects Southern Architecture Awards. In 2020, Wright won the Wirihana Leadership Award at the Architecture + Women NZ Dulux Awards.

== Personal life ==
Wright is married to fellow architect Justin Wright. The couple have three children.
