= Inslee (surname) =

Inslee is a surname. Notable people with the surname include:

- Charles Inslee (1870–1922), American actor
- Jay Inslee (born 1951), American politician, governor of the State of Washington
- Joseph Inslee Anderson (1757–1837; maternal surname Inslee), American politician, first comptroller of the U.S. Treasury, federal senator for Tennessee
- R. Inslee Clark Jr. (1935–1999), American educator

== See also ==
- Insley (surname)
