= Jessica Barter =

New Zealand architect

- Education: University of Auckland
- Occupation: Architect
- Awards: Wirihana Leadership Award

Jessica Barter is a New Zealand architect. In 2017 she was the joint winner of the Wirihana Leadership Award at the Architecture + Women NZ Dulux Awards.

== Biography ==
Barter originally planned to study medicine, but enrolled to study architecture instead, at the University of Auckland. In 2010, she and Maggie Carroll founded their own architecture firm, Bureaux. In 2016, Barter and Carroll contributed to the design of the New Zealand pavilion at the Venice Biennale of Architecture.

== Personal life ==
Barter has two children. Occasionally Barter is referred to as Jessica Walker.
