= Tere Insley =

New Zealand architect

- Insley in 2026
- Born: Alexandra Tere Insley
- Education: University of Auckland
- Occupation: Architect
- Children: Matekitātahi Rāwiri
- Practice: Kauri Architects

Alexandra Tere Insley is a New Zealand Māori architect. She was the first registered Māori woman architect. Insley is of Te Whanau-a-Apanui descent.

== Biography ==
Insley was raised in a Te Reo Māori speaking household in Otuwhare in the Bay of Plenty Region. She studied at the University of Auckland, graduating in 1980 as the first wahine Māori (Māori woman) with a degree in architecture at the time. Additionally, in 1984 she became the first wahine Māori registered architect in Aotearoa New Zealand.

Insley first worked for the Ministry of Works and Development, then in 1990 she established her own practice, Kauri Architects. Her architectural practice aims to incorporate Māori knowledge into the Eurocentric discipline, by working locally and nationally to deliver projects representative of whakapapa and place. Insley is also a New Zealand Registered Architects Board (NZRAB) registration assessor, and a Fellow of Te Kāhui Whaihanga New Zealand Institute of Architects.

Projects with Ministry of Works and Development
| Historic Places Trust Restoration reports ( - 2009) | Project management ( - 2009) |
|---|---|
| Wharenui: Te Kororia, Whakaara Tamaiti marae, Putāruru; Matua-a-iwi, Tokikapu marae, Waitomo; Te Kapua Whakapipi, Te Rangi-ita marae, Tūrangi; Te Poroporo, Whakatāne; Te Ngawari, Oputao marae, Ruatāhuna; Rangihouhiri, Whakatāne; Taiwhakaea, Whakatāne | Whakatāne Courthouse; Kawerau Fire Station extensions; Rotorua Fire Station |

Projects with Warren + Mahoney
| Year(s) | Name | Location | Source |
|---|---|---|---|
| 2002 - 2012 | MIT and Transport Interchange, Manukau | Manukau | |
| 2002 - 2012 | National Library Wellington alterations | Wellington | |
| 2002 - 2012 | Southern Cross Medical Centre | - - | |
| 2010 | Te Wharekura o Te Rau Aroha, Ngarua | Ngarua | |
| 2010 | Novotel Hotel, Auckland International Airport | Auckland International Airport | |
| 2010 | Auckland Mail Centre, Highbrook | Highbrook | |
| 2010 | Whare Taonga, Tūrangawaewae | Tūrangawaewae | |
| 2010 | Upper Harbour Primary School, Auckland Stages 01 and 02 | Auckland | |

Projects with Kauri Architects
| Year(s) | Name | Location | Source |
|---|---|---|---|
| 2014 | C Company Exhibition extension, Tairawhiti Museum, Gisborne | Tairawhiti Museum, Gisborne | |
| 2015 | Te Tini o Porou Stage 01 alterations, Te Runanganui o Ngāti Porou | Former DB Hotel (Kaiti), Whanau Ora offices and Youth Services | |
| 2012 - 2016 | Hauhunga Marae: Whare nui, Whare kai and Administration for Ngāti Rārua | Blenheim | |
| 2012 - 2016 | Te Runanganui o Ngāti Porou offices, Ruatoria alterations | Gisborne | |
| 2012 - 2016 | Raparapa Ririki Outdoor pursuits/tourism for Te Runanganui o Ngāti Porou | Gisborne | |
| --- | Hinehou Kohanga Reo, Western Springs | Western Springs | |
| --- | University of Auckland, Kohanga Reo | University of Auckland | |

== Legacy ==
In 2026, Architecture and Women New Zealand introduced a new Tere Hunuku te Kawakawa Leadership Award in their Dulux series after Insley for her influence in Aotearoa New Zealand's architectural scene. The award celebrates women in the second decade of their career that show outstanding architectural talent and leadership.

Tere Hunuku te Kawakawa Leadership Award Recipients
| Year | Finalists | Winner | Source |
|---|---|---|---|
| 2026 | Caro Robertson (Spacecraft Architects), Divya Purushotham (Warren & Mahoney), Lucy Hayes-Stevenson (Cheshire Architects), Magdalena Garbarczyk (Fineline Architecture), Madeline Sharpe (Synergine) | Divya Purushotham, Warren & Mahoney | |
