= Cecile Bonnifait =

French architect in New Zealand

- Born: France
- Occupation: Architect

Cecile Bonnifait (born 1971) is a French architect based in New Zealand.

== Biography ==
Bonnifait studied architecture at Architecte DPLG in Bordeaux, France. She worked in France, China, Tibet and Finland before moving to New Zealand in 2000. In 2001, she co-founded Atelierworkshop Architects. From 2000 to 2004 she lectured at Victoria University's School of Architecture.

Bonnifait co-created a prototype for a holiday house from a shipping container, naming it Port-a-Bach. The model was not produced for sale as the concept was considered restrictive; instead, Bonnifait went on to co-create a similar product, Mini-Fab.

=== Awards and honours ===
In 2014, Bonnifait won the Whirihana Emerging Leardership Award at the Architecture + Women NZ Dulux Awards.
