= Kathy Waghorn =

Architect in New Zealand

- Born: 1970 (age 55–56); Ōmata, Taranaki Region, New Zealand

Academic background
- Education: University of Auckland; RMIT University

Kathy Waghorn (born 1970) is a New Zealand architectural academic, artist and curator based in New Zealand. She is the director of the social enterprise company HOOPLA.

== Biography ==
Waghorn is from Ōmata, a settlement in Taranaki, New Zealand. She graduated with a Bachelor of Architectural Studies from the University of Auckland and in 2017 received a PhD from RMIT University for her thesis, The practice of feeling for place: a compendium for an expanded Architecture.

Waghorn is co-director with Nina Patel of HOOPLA, an Auckland social enterprise, established in 2013. HOOPLA and Waghorn were recognised in 2023 at the A+W Dulux Awards winning the Munro Diversity Award which celebrates those who support diversity in the field of architecture. The judges said: "Dr. Kathy Waghorn is a highly esteemed academic whose work over many decades has constantly challenged the ideas of practice and pedagogy."

She has taught at the University of Auckland, then at Huri Te Ao, The School of Future Environments at AUT. She is associate professor in the architecture department at Monash University, Naarm / Melbourne. As a teacher the community engagement work of HOOPLA 'underpins' her pedagogy.

As an artist curator, Waghorn created Muddy Urbanism, at the Auckland Triennial (2013) and the New Zealand pavilion at La Biennale di Venezia 15th International Architecture Exhibition. A 2019 project was exhibition and book Making Ways, Alternative Architectural Practice in Aotearoa at Objectspace Auckland. Waghorn was co-curator and co-editor along with architectural lecturer Mike Davis. In the work is themes of resistance to a capitalist, political economy and how architectural and design can do this.

== Selected publications ==
- Making Ways: Alternative Architectural Practice in Aotearoa (2019) - book, Co-edited with Mike Davis, published by Objectspace
- A transformative architectural pedagogy and tool for a time of converging crises, journal article (2022), A Yates, M Pedersen Zari, S Bloomfield, A Burgess, C Walker, K Waghorn. Urban Science 7 (1), 1
