= Jade Kake =

New Zealand Māori architectural designer

- Born: Bonnie Jade Kake; Australia
- Education: University of Queensland, Unitec Institute of Technology
- Occupation: Architect
- Awards: Warren Trust Awards for Architectural Writing, Munro Diversity Award
- Practice: Matakohe Architecture

Bonnie Jade Kake is a New Zealand Māori architect and academic of Ngāpuhi, Te Arawa and Whakatōhea iwi. She specialises in designing communities and housing based on a traditional model of living known as papakāinga.

== Biography ==
Kake was born in Australia to a New Zealand Māori mother and a Dutch father. She grew up in an eco-community called Billen Cliffs, which her parents had founded, in rural northern New South Wales. As a child, she frequently visited her mother's family and land near Whangārei. Kake completed a degree in architectural design at the University of Queensland in 2009, followed by a short course in carpentry at a TAFE (a Technical and Further Education college).

In her early 20s, Kake moved to Auckland to work for Rau Hoskins and his design firm, designTRIBE. From 2013 to 2015 Kake studied for a master's degree in architecture at Unitec Institute of Technology.

In 2018, Kake established her own business, Matakohe Architecture and Urbanism, in Whangārei, which speclalises in supporting Māori communities to develop their land. Kake is also a lecturer in the School of Future Environments at Auckland University of Technology; she researches and teaches on decolonisation of architecture and urban design, the re-establishment of papakāinga, and the development of design methods to support Māori sovereignty. In 2019 she published a book describing the resurgence of papakāinga.

In 2025 Kake became the first architect in New Zealand to complete her architectural registration in te reo Māori, the Māori language.

=== Awards and recognition ===
In 2018 and 2019, Kake won Warren Trust Awards for Architectural Writing for her essays on Rāpaki Marae and Ruapekapeka. In 2019, she received a Michael King Emerging Māori Writers Residency.

In 2020, Kake won the Munro Diversity Award at the Architecture + Women NZ Dulux Awards. In 2021, she received an award from the New Zealand Society of Authors to support her research into the life and legacy of Rewi Thompson.

== Publications ==
- Kake, J. (2023). Checkerboard Hill. Wellington: Huia Publishers.
- Hansen, J. & Kake, J. (2023). Rewi: Āta haere, kia tere. Wellington: Massey University Press.
- Kake J. (2019). Rebuilding the kāinga: lessons from te ao hurihuri. Bridget Williams Books.
