= Fiona Christeller =

New Zealand architect and jeweller

Fiona Christeller is a New Zealand architect and jeweler who was a founding member of the Women's Institute of Architecture (WIA) group when it formed in May 1979. She is based in Wellington. She was also the recipient of the Fletcher Scholarship in 1977, during her final year in architecture school.

== Biography ==
While at architecture school in her final year in 1977 Christeller got a Fletcher Scholarship in 1977. In 1979, she was a founding member of the Women's Institute of Architecture.

Christeller first practiced architecture in Auckland, before moving to Wellington in the mid-1980s. Notably, she chose to establish her practice in an office in the city instead of working from home to assert that women, like men, were legitimate architects and should not be expected to work from home. Her Wellington-based practice FCA (formerly Fiona Christeller Architects) closed at the beginning of 2014. About half of her projects focused on domestic buildings, and the other half commercial and school buildings.

Christeller designed a co-sustainable house called 'Rangimarie' on an infill site in Wellington completed in 2012. The house won a Wellington Award at the New Zealand Institute of Architects (NZIA) Local Awards. The judges said: "The building is carefully composed in a way that appears effortless...".

Christeller is a jeweler and had an exhibition with Birgit Moffatt at Pataka Art + Museum in Porirua in 2018 and a group exhibition at Studio Toru in Wellington in 2023.

== Awards ==
- 2012, Wellington Award, NZIA Local Awards - Rangimarie
- 2020, Presidents Award, NZIA
