= Event-Space: Theatre Architecture and the Historical Avant-Garde =

2019 book by Dorita Hannah

- Cover
- Author: Dorita Hannah
- Language: English
- Subject: Constructivism, symbolism and surrealism
- Genre: Nonfiction
- Publisher: Routledge
- Publication date: July 11, 2018
- Pages: 402
- ISBN: 9780415832175

Event-Space: Theatre Architecture and the Historical Avant-Garde is a book by New Zealand scholar and author Dorita Hannah. It was published in 2018 by Routledge.

== Critical reception ==
Evelyn Lima says the multiple disciplines contained in the book "is sure to attract readers from different fields of study," and "should benefit from the courageous and daring proposal of this book in their future investigations". She also praises Hannah's argument in each chapter being "thought-provoking and fascinating journey".
