= Te Pūtahi Centre for Architecture and City Making =

New Zealand nonprofit organisation

Te Pūtahi
- Te Pūtahi Centre for Architecture and City Making
- Te Pūtahi (Māori)
- Formation: 2019 (7 years ago)
- Founder: Jessica Halliday and others
- Type: Charitable trust
- Registration no.: CC48916 (under Charities Act 2005)
- Location: Christchurch, New Zealand
- Website: teputahi.org.nz

Te Pūtahi Centre for Architecture and City Making is a nonprofit organisation that promotes and supports city-making and architectural design in Christchurch, New Zealand.

The centre runs the annual Open Christchurch festival, when architecturally significant buildings in Christchurch are opened to the public. The event evolved from the post-earthquake Festival of Transitional Architecture (FESTA). The centre also runs the Christchurch Conversations series, which are public speaking events about city design and urbanism. They also own The Arcades art installation on The Commons in Victoria Square.

The centre is directed by architectural historian Jessica Halliday.
