= Kauae Raro Research Collective =

New Zealand art collective

- He Kapunga Oneone
- Formation: 2019; 7 years ago
- Professional title: Artist and Research Collective
- Headquarters: New Zealand
- Key people: Sarah Hudson, Lanae Cable, Jordan Davey-Emms
- Website: https://www.kauaeraro.com/

The Kauae Raro Research Collective, also known as He Kapunga Oneone, is an artist and research collective that specialises in earth pigments used in Māori culture.

== History ==
The collective came together in 2019 by Sarah Hudson, Lanae Cable and Jordan Davey-Emms. Each of them bring different experiences and skills to their projects with backgrounds in areas of art, research and Māori medicine and traditional healing practices. The core group of members are originally from and based near the Ōhinemataroa river in Whakatāne, but the reach of the collective spans much of New Zealand Working as a collective has brought new opportunities for the artists involved, including having conversations with iwi regarding the colours used by the collective.

The idea for the group originated from Hudson, Cable, and Davey-Emms taking a road trip together to Bay of Plenty and Taupō to locate and view Ngā Toi Ana (Māori rock art). They came across many historical sites on their travels, including a 'petra glyphe' or 'carved rock wall' home to traditional art of Ngāti Manawa originally recorded from the 16th and early 17th centuries upon their land occupation. They also surveyed the colours of Maunga Kākaramea (Rainbow Mountain) and a rock wall painting done with kōkōwai (red ochre) in the mountain of Lake Tarawera.

Their practice as a collective involves the search for pigments, the treatment of them as taonga and with mātauranga Māori in mind, and the education on how they are used whether that be medically inclined, spiritual healing, painting or adornment. The members reach out to practitioners of weaving and carving who use different native plants in their colour palettes with the intent of rediscovering the methods of past generations as well as reclaiming land.

As a research and art focused collective they are clear that they aren't about making strictly research outcomes, but instead using the research to influence and inform their practice. However physical findings and experiments of theirs are frequently published by them online in a free and sharable format, or presented in person workshops for multiple age groups.

== Projects ==
Date	Title	People	Location
2023	Kauae Raro Commission	Kauae Raro Research Collective	Te Papa
23 September 2023 – 19 May 2024	Te Mata Tūroa o Papa, This Natural World	Raewyn Atkinson, Chris Charteris, Karl Fritsch, Eléna Gee, Christine Hellyar, Kauae Raro Research Collective, Alan Preston, Joe Sheehan, Te Aue Takotoroa Davis	Te Papa

== Members ==
=== Sarah Hudson ===
Hudson's strategies of dealing with the politics of the use of whenua regarding the collective have been pointed out. Alongside her participation in Kauae Raro, she is also a key member of the Mataaho Collective.

=== Lanae Cable ===
Cable uses earth pigments in their practice via staining and dying in a journey to reconnect with her whakapapa, whenua and identity. All the different pigments she uses are sampled on bandanas.

=== Jordan Davey-Emms ===
Davey-Emms is an artist and curator for Wormhole Gallery in Edgecumbe, Whakatāne and was formerly a member of the collective from 2019 to 2022. In her artistic practice she conveys various themes related to the making process, the environment and identity. Furthermore, she has pieces of writing published in Plates Journal, Vernacular, Wormhole Gallery's online publication site.

=== Kahu Kutia ===
Kutia is a writer, artist, and Māori climate activist in Te Whanganui-a-Tara, Wellington, alongside being listed as a member of the collective. She has published work in Vice NZ, Te Ao Mārama, and The Wireless.

== Recognition ==
The collective were recognised in 2022 by contemporary New Zealand artist, Ayesha Green in a Stuff interview discussing some of her favourite things. Green makes note of their 'dedicat[ion] to Māori art sovereignty through whenua and whakapapa.'

Additionally in 2022, Creative New Zealand reported that in the past two years they had funded 35 different initiatives in the arts including 'ngā tae oneone (use of earth pigments).' They supplied funding to the Kauae Raro Research Collective for a year to assist in their online resource project.
