= Highbrook =

Coordinates: 36°56′09″S 174°52′36″E

- Suburb
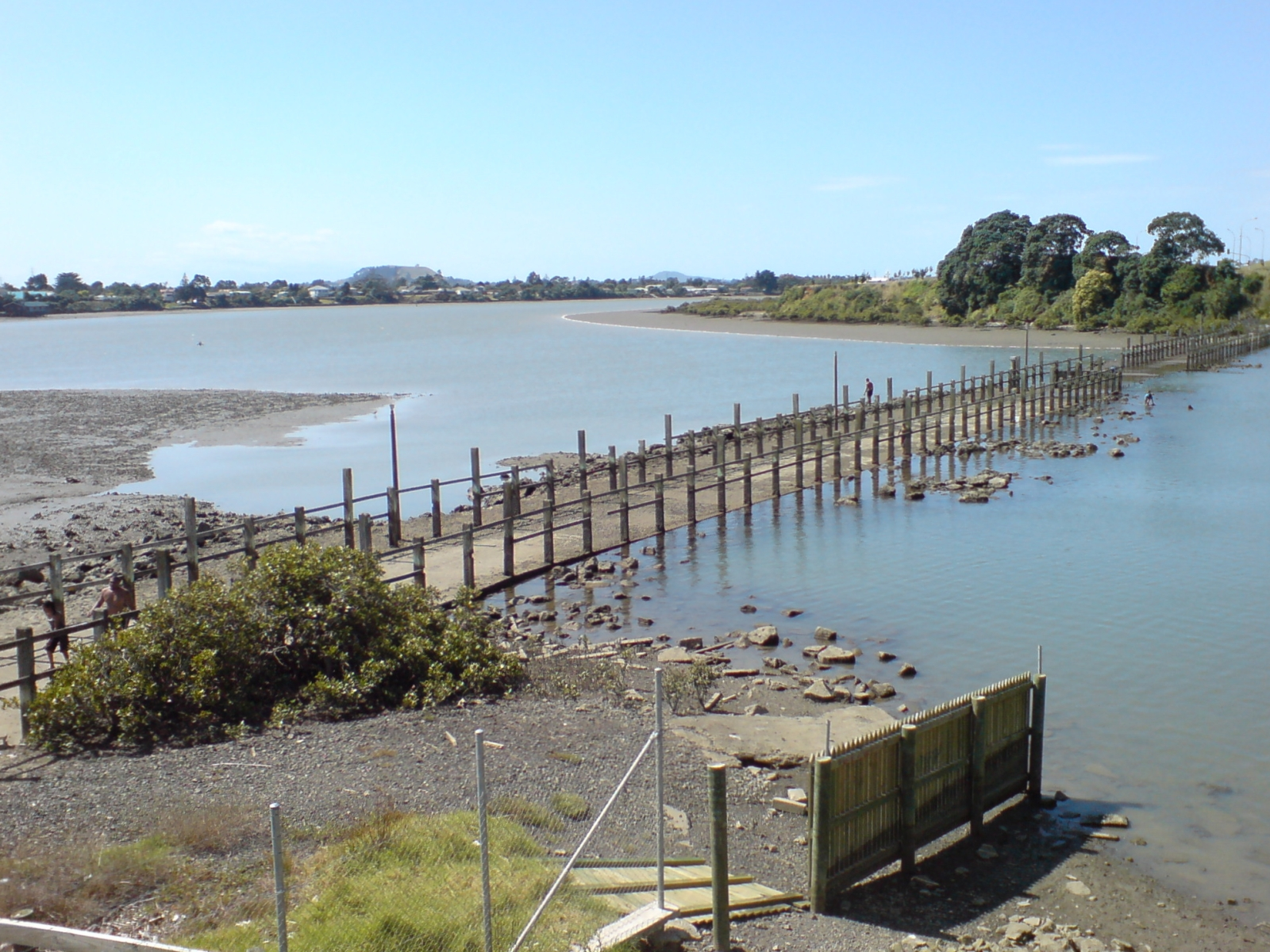
- Interactive map of Highbrook
- Country: New Zealand
- City: Auckland
- Local authority: Auckland Council
- Electoral ward: Howick ward
- Local board: Howick Local Board

	Pakuranga	Botany Downs
Ōtara	Highbrook	Dannemora
Greenmount	Flat Bush	Flat Bush

Highbrook is a suburb located in the city of Auckland, in the North Island of New Zealand. The area is on the eastern side of the Auckland city centre and is a large industrial area developed only in recent years. The area is under governance of the Auckland Council, and is home to a large bulk of New Zealand and international businesses and organisations.

== History ==
The eastern shores of the Tāmaki River is part of the rohe of Ngāi Tai ki Tāmaki, who descend from the crew of the Tainui migratory waka, who visited the area around the year 1300. The mouth of the Tāmaki River was traditionally known as Te Wai ō Tāiki ("The Waters of Tāiki"), named after the Ngāi Tai ancestor Tāiki. Tāiki settled with his followers along the eastern shores of the Tāmaki River, alongside the descendants of Huiārangi of the early iwi Te Tini ō Maruiwi. The upper reaches of the river near modern Pakuranga is traditionally known as Te Wai Mokoia, referring to Mokoikahikuwaru, a protector taniwha of the Tainui waka who is described in legends as taking up residence at the Panmure Basin. Ngāi Tai created extensive cultivations along the eastern shores of the Tāmaki River. Ururoa is a traditional settlement in Highbrook, and was a location where fish were dried, even in the late 1820s.

From the 1960s, Highbrook was the estate of Sir Woolf Fisher, founder of Fisher & Paykel. The area was known as the Ra Ora Stud and was used as a breeding and training facility for racehorses.

The Fisher family opted to use the land for commercial development and developed plans in 1998. In 2001, business zoning was allowed and commercial property was developed under the company name Highbrook Development Ltd.

In 2007, the new Highbrook motorway interchange was completed, facilitating improved access to the area.

In 2021, New Zealand's first large-scale Covid-19 vaccination centre opened in Highbrook, initially serving household contacts of border workers.

== Demographics ==
Highbrook is included in the demographics for East Tāmaki.
