= Insley Manufacturing Co. =

Equipment construction company

- Founded: 1905; 121 years ago in Indianapolis, U.S.
- Founders: William Henry Insley
- Defunct: 1975
- Successor: United Dominion Industries
- Headquarters: Indianapolis, U.S.
- Key people: William Henry Insley (chairman & Founder)

The Insley Manufacturing Company produced heavy construction equipment, and was based in Indianapolis, Indiana.

== History ==
The company was founded in 1905 by William Henry Insley (16 January 1870 - 17 October 1962). The company holds many patents for cable-operated digging equipment, such as Dragline excavators and power shovels, such as the Insley model k12. Insley lost its independence in 1975 when purchased by United Dominion Industries; the name is currently held by Badger Equipment Co.

== See also ==
- M1918 light repair truck
- Dump truck (bottom dump)
