= Lori Brown (architect) =

American architect (born 1969)

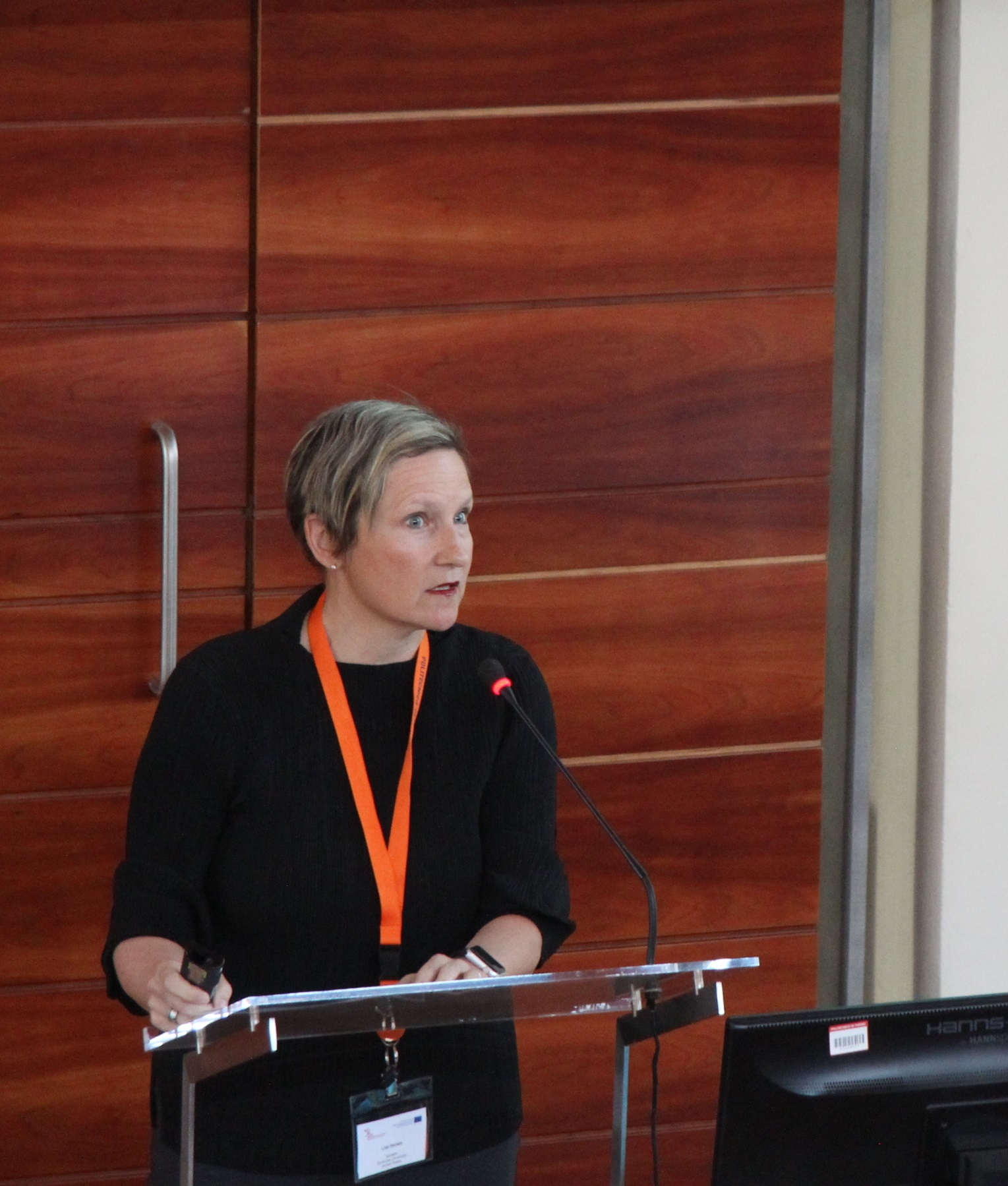
- Born: March 1, 1969 (age 57); Decatur, Georgia
- Education: Princeton University; Georgia Tech
- Occupation: Architect
- Employer: Syracuse University

Lori Brown (born March 1, 1969) is an American architect and the co-founder of ArchiteXX, a group dedicated to transforming the architecture profession for women. She is a registered architect, author and Distinguished professor at Syracuse University. Her research focuses on architecture and social justice issues with particular emphasis on gender and its impact upon spatial relationships. She is an elected fellow of the American Institute of Architects and a member of the American Association of University Women.

== Education ==
Brown received a Bachelor of Science degree from the Georgia Institute of Technology where she spent her final year studying at the École Spéciale d'Architecture in Paris. Following, she received a Master of Architecture degree from Princeton University. Prior to teaching, Brown was working as an architect in New York City for several award-winning firms including Pei Cobb Freed & Partners, Gwathmey Siegel & Associates Architects and Hali Weiss Architects. She is a registered architect in the state of New York and a member of the American Institute of Architects.

== Career ==
In the spring of 2012, Lori Brown and Nina Freedman co-founded the group ArchiteXX. An independent organization aimed to transform the profession of architecture for women in New York. They launched a fundraiser on Indiegogo to raise money for their organisation. Brown also was the architect for the renovation of the Vera House Shelter for victims of domestic violence. She partnered with a Turkish colleague for research on women's shelters in Turkey.

For her book on Contested Space: Abortion Clinics, Women's Shelters and Hospitals, Brown conducted in-depth research on abortion clinics in America. She visited abortion clinics and mentioned how most of the buildings were not designed for medical procedures because people were unwilling to sell to abortion providers. Brown writes:

"Architecture is absent in these types of spaces, they can't afford architects or architectural services, they believe architects won't work with them, and they are often in existing spaces that have been re-appropriated as a medical facility.

She also participated in a traveling tour, which originally started off as an exhibition, called Feminist Practices which inspired her to write a book under the same name: Feminist Practices: Interdisciplinary Approaches to Women in Architecture. In March 2012 Brown organized a 3-day event at the Van Allen Institute in Manhattan that brought together ten speakers focusing on the topic of Feminist Practices. The event also marked the release of Brown's edited version of Feminist Practices. She also worked with German and Australian groups to include more female architects to Wikipedia.

Currently, she is writing Birthing centers, borders, and bodies, and working as an editor for the Bloomsbury Global Encyclopedia of Women in Architecture. An encyclopedia of information on women architects.

== Awards and grants ==
- Elected a Fellow of the American Institute of Architects (2022)
- Grant from the Abortion Conversation Project 2014.
- Mary Lily Travel Grant to Duke University's Sallie Bingham Center for Women's History and Culture Library Archives, 2010.
- Milka Bliznakov Prize Commendation for feminist practices exhibition 2008.
- American Institute of Architects Diversity Best Practice Honorable Mention 2008.
- Syracuse University Chancellor's Award for Public Service, March 2006 in collaboration with Alison Mountz, for "boundaries in Syracuse: gender architecture geography".
- AIA Central New York Merit Award, Unbuilt Project for the Upstate University Hospital Chapel renovation, October 2005.

== Publications ==
- The Bloomsbury Global Encyclopedia of Women in Architecture, 1960-2020, v.1. 640 page online version. Print version forthcoming April 2026.
- Birthing Centers, Borders and Bodies, forthcoming.
- Contested Spaces: Abortion Clinics, Women's Shelters and Hospitals, Routledge, 2013.
- Feminist Practices: Interdisciplinary Approaches to Women in Architecture, Ashgate Publishing Co., 2011.
